= List of electoral wards in England by constituency =

This article is a list of electoral wards (i.e. those used for local elections) in each parliamentary constituency in England. For those in Wales, see List of electoral wards in Wales. Wards are as they existed on 1 December 2020 unless otherwise stated.

== East Midlands ==
Amber Valley
Amber Valley: Alferton; Codnor & Wainsgroves; Heage & Ambergate; Heanor & Loscoe; Heanor East; Heanor West; Ironville & Riddings; Kilburn, Denby & Holbrook; Langley Mill & Aldercar; Ripley; Ripley & Marehay; Shipley Park, Horsley & Horsley Woodhouse; Somercotes; Swanwick; Wingfield.

Ashfield
Ashfield: Abbey Hill; Annesley & Kirkby Woodhouse; Ashfields; Carsic; Central & New Cross; Huthwaite & Brierley; Jacksdale; Kingsway; Kirkby Cross & Portland; Larwood; Leamington; St. Mary’s; Selston; Skegby; Stanton Hill & Teversal; Summit; Sutton Junction & Harlow Wood; The Dales; Underwood.

Mansfield: Berry Hill (polling district BHC); Bull Farm & Pleasley Hill.

Bassetlaw
Bassetlaw: Beckingham, Blyth, Carlton, East Retford East, East Retford North, East Retford South, East Retford West, Everton, Harworth, Langold, Misterton, Ranskill, Sutton, Welbeck, Worksop East, Worksop North, Worksop North East, Worksop North West, Worksop South, Worksop South East.

Bolsover
Bolsover: Ault Hucknall; Barlborough; Blackwell; Bolsover East; Bolsover North & Shuttlewood; Bolsover South; Clowne East; Clowne West; Elmton-with-Creswell; Langwith; Pinxton; Shirebrook North; Shirebrook South; South Normanton East; South Normanton West; Tibshelf; Whitwell.

North East Derbyshire: Holmewood & Heath; Pilsley & Morton; Shirland; Sutton.

Boston and Skegness
Boston: Coastal; Fenside; Fishtoft; Five Village; Kirton & Frampton; Old Leake & Wrangle; Skirbeck; St Thomas’; Staniland; Station; Swineshead & Holland Fen; Trinity; West; Witham; Wyberton.

East Lindsey: Burgh le Marsh; Chapel St. Leonards; Croft; Friskney; Ingoldmells; St. Clement’s; Scarbrough & Seacroft; Sibsey & Stickney; Wainfleet; Willoughby with Sloothby; Winthorpe.

Broxtowe
Broxtowe: Attenborough & Chilwell East; Awsworth, Cossall & Trowell; Beeston Central; Beeston North; Beeston Rylands; Beeston West; Bramcote; Brinsley; Chilwell West; Eastwood Hall; Eastwood Hilltop; Eastwood St. Mary’s; Greasley; Stapleford North; Stapleford South East; Stapleford South West; Toton & Chilwell Meadows.

Chesterfield
Chesterfield: Brimington North; Brimington South; Brockwell; Dunston; Hasland; Hollingwood & Inkersall; Holmebrook; Linacre; Loundsley Green; Middlecroft & Poolsbrook; Moor; Old Whittington; Rother; St. Helen’s; St. Leonard’s; Walton; West.

Corby and East Northamptonshire
North Northamptonshire: (Note: Wards as they existed on 1 April 2021.) Corby Rural (polling districts CRWA, CSCA, CWGA, CWGB & CWGC); Corby West; Irthlingborough (polling districts RA, RB, RR, SG, SZ & UQ); Kingswood; Lloyds; Oakley; Oundle; Raunds; Thrapston.

Daventry
North Northamptonshire: Earls Barton.

West Northamptonshire: Braunston & Crick; Brixworth; Daventry East; Daventry West; Long Buckby; Moulton; Silverstone (polling districts SAG, SAP, SAQ, SBJ & SCL); Woodford & Weedon.

Derby North
Derby: Abbey; Chaddesden; Darley; Derwent; Littleover; Mackworth; Mickleover.

Derby South
Derby: Alvaston; Arboretum; Blagreaves; Boulton; Chellaston; Normanton; Sinfin.

Derbyshire Dales
Amber Valley: Alport; Crich.

Derbyshire Dales: Ashbourne North; Ashbourne South; Bakewell; Bradwell; Brailsford; Calver; Carsington Water; Chatsworth; Clifton & Bradley; Darley Dale; Dovedale & Parwich; Doveridge & Sudbury; Hartington & Taddington; Hathersage & Eyam; Hulland; Lathkill & Bradford; Litton & Longstone; Masson; Matlock All Saints; Matlock St Giles; Norbury; Stanton; Tideswell; Winster & South Darley; Wirksworth.

South Derbyshire: Hatton; Hilton.

Erewash
Erewash: Awsworth Road; Breaston; Cotmanhay; Derby Road East; Derby Road West; Draycott & Risley; Hallam Fields; Kirk Hallam & Stanton-by-Dale; Larklands; Little Hallam; Long Eaton Central; Nottingham Road; Sandiacre; Sawley; Shipley View; Wilsthorpe.

Gainsborough
West Lindsey: Bardney; Caistor & Yarborough; Cherry Willingham; Dunholme & Welton; Gainsborough East; Gainsborough North; Gainsborough South-West; Hemswell; Kelsey Wold; Lea; Market Rasen; Nettleham; Saxilby; Scampton; Scotter & Blyton; Stow; Sudbrooke; Torksey; Waddingham & Spital; Wold View.

Gedling
Gedling: Bestwood St. Albans; Carlton; Carlton Hill; Cavendish; Colwick; Coppice; Daybrook; Dumbles; Ernehale; Gedling; Netherfield; Phoenix; Plains; Porchester; Redhill; Trent Valley; Woodthorpe.

Grantham and Bourne
North Kesteven: Heckington Rural; Osbournby.

South Kesteven: Aveland; Belmont; Belvoir; Bourne Austerby; Bourne East; Bourne West; Grantham Arnoldfield; Grantham Barrowby Gate; Grantham Earlesfield; Grantham Harrowby; Grantham Springfield; Grantham St. Vincent’s; Grantham St. Wulfram’s; Lincrest; Loveden Heath; Morton; Peascliffe & Ridgeway; Toller; Viking.

Harborough, Oadby and Wigston
Harborough: Glen; Kibworths; Lubenham; Market Harborough – Great Bowden & Arden; Market Harborough – Little Bowden; Market Harborough – Logan; Market Harborough – Welland.

Oadby and Wigston: Oadby Brocks Hill; Oadby Grange; Oadby St Peter’s; Oadby Uplands; Oadby Woodlands; South Wigston; Wigston All Saints; Wigston Meadowcourt; Wigston St Wolstan’s; Wigston Fields.

High Peak
High Peak: Barms, Blackbrook, Burbage, Buxton Central, Chapel East, Chapel West, Corbar, Cote Heath, Dinting, Gamesley, Hadfield North, Hadfield South, Hayfield, Hope Valley, Howard Town, Limestone Peak, New Mills East, New Mills West, Old Glossop, Padfield, St John’s, Sett, Simmondley, Stone Bench, Temple, Tintwistle, Whaley Bridge, Whitfield.

Hinckley and Bosworth
Hinckley and Bosworth: Ambien; Barlestone, Nailstone & Osbaston; Barwell; Burbage St. Catherines & Lash Hill; Burbage Sketchley & Stretton; Cadeby, Carlton & Market Bosworth with Shackerstone; Earl Shilton; Hinckley Castle; Hinckley Clarendon; Hinckley De Montfort; Hinckley Trinity; Newbold Verdon with Desford & Peckleton; Twycross & Witherley with Sheepy.

Kettering
North Northamptonshire: Burton & Broughton; Clover Hill; Corby Rural (polling districts CRWB, CRWC, CRWD, CRWE, CSCB & CSCC); Desborough; Ise; Northall; Rothwell & Mawsley; Wicksteed; Windmill.

Leicester East
Leicester: Belgrave; Evington (polling districts EVA, EVB, EVC, EVD & EVE); Humberstone & Hamilton; North Evington; Rushey Mead; Thurncourt; Troon.

Leicester South
Leicester: Castle; Evington (polling district EVF); Eyres Monsell; Knighton; Saffron; Spinney Hills; Stoneygate; Wycliffe.

Leicester West
Leicester: Abbey; Aylestone; Beaumont Leys; Braunstone Park & Rowley Fields; Fosse; Westcotes; Western.

Lincoln
Lincoln: Abbey; Birchwood; Boultham; Carholme; Castle; Glebe; Hartsholme; Minster; Moorland; Park; Witham.

Loughborough
Charnwood: Barrow & Sileby West; Loughborough Ashby; Loughborough Dishley & Hathern; Loughborough Garendon; Loughborough Hastings; Loughborough Lemyngton; Loughborough Nanpantan; Loughborough Outwoods; Loughborough Shelthorpe; Loughborough Southfields; Loughborough Storer; Quorn & Mountsorrel Castle; Shepshed East; Shepshed West; The Wolds.

Louth and Horncastle
East Lindsey: Alford; Binbrook; Coningsby & Mareham; Fulstow; Grimoldby; Hagworthingham; Halton Holegate; Holton-le-Clay & North Thoresby; Horncastle; Legbourne; Mablethorpe; Marshchapel & Somercotes; North Holme; Priory & St. James’; Roughton; St. Margaret’s; St. Mary’s; St. Michael’s; Spilsby; Sutton on Sea; Tetford & Donington; Tetney; Trinity; Withern & Theddlethorpe; Woodhall Spa; Wragby.

Mansfield
Mansfield: Abbott; Berry Hill (polling districts BHA & BHB); Brick Kiln; Broomhill; Carr Bank; Eakring; Grange Farm; Holly; Hornby; Kings Walk; Kingsway; Ladybrook; Lindhurst; Ling Forest; Manor; Market Warsop; Maun Valley; Meden; Netherfield; Newgate; Newlands; Oak Tree; Oakham; Park Hall; Peafields; Penniment; Portland; Racecourse; Ransom Wood; Sandhurst; Sherwood; Warsop Carrs; Woodhouse; Woodlands; Yeoman Hill.

Melton and Syston
Charnwood: East Goscote; Queniborough; Sileby; Syston East; Syston West; Thurmaston; Wreake Villages.

Melton: Asfordby; Bottesford; Croxton Kerrial; Frisby-on-the-Wreake; Gaddesby; Long Clawson & Stathern; Melton Craven; Melton Dorian; Melton Egerton; Melton Newport; Melton Sysonby; Melton Warwick; Old Dalby; Somerby; Waltham-on-the-Wolds; Wymondham.

Mid Derbyshire
Amber Valley: Belper Central; Belper East; Belper North; Belper South; Duffield; South West Parishes.

Derby: Allestree; Oakwood; Spondon.

Erewash: Little Eaton & Stanley; Ockbrook & Borrowash; West Hallam & Dale Abbey.

Mid Leicestershire
Blaby: Ellis; Fairestone; Forest; Millfield; Muxloe; Ravenhurst & Fosse; Winstanley.

Charnwood: Anstey; Birstall Wanlip; Birstall Watermead; Forest Bradgate; Mountsorrel; Rothley and Thurcaston.

Hinckley and Bosworth: Groby; Markfield, Stanton & Fieldhead; Ratby, Bagworth & Thornton.

Newark
Bassetlaw: Clayworth; East Markham; Rampton; Sturton; Tuxford & Trent.

North East Derbyshire
Chesterfield: Barrow Hill & New Whittington; Lowgates & Woodthorpe.

North East Derbyshire: Ashover; Barlow & Holmesfield; Brampton & Walton; Clay Cross North; Clay Cross South; Coal Aston; Dronfield North; Dronfield South; Dronfield Woodhouse; Eckington North; Eckington South & Renishaw; Gosforth Valley; Grassmoor; Killamarsh East; Killamarsh West; North Wingfield Central; Ridgeway & Marsh Lane; Tupton; Unstone; Wingerworth.

North West Leicestershire
North West Leicestershire: Ashby Castle; Ashby Holywell; Ashby Ivanhoe; Ashby Money Hill; Ashby Willesley; Ashby Woulds; Bardon; Blackfordby; Broom Leys; Castle Donington Castle; Castle Donington Central; Castle Donington Park; Castle Rock; Coalville East; Coalville West; Daleacre Hill; Ellistown & Battleflat; Greenhill; Hermitage; Holly Hayes; Hugglescote St. John’s; Hugglescote St. Mary’s; Ibstock East; Ibstock West; Kegworth; Long Whatton & Diseworth; Measham North; Measham South; Ravenstone & Packington; Sence Valley; Snibston North; Snibston South; Thornborough; Thringstone; Valley; Worthington & Breedon.

Northampton North
West Northamptonshire: Abington & Phippsville; Boothville & Parklands; Castle; Dallington Spencer; Headlands; Kingsthorpe North; Kingsthorpe South; St. George; Talavera.

Northampton South
West Northamptonshire: Billing & Rectory Farm; Delapre & Rushmere; Duston East Duston West & St. Crispin; East Hunsbury & Shelfleys; Nene Valley; Riverside Park; Sixfields.

Nottingham East
Nottingham: Berridge; Castle; Dales; Hyson Green & Arboretum; Mapperley; St. Ann’s; Sherwood.

Nottingham North and Kimberley
Broxtowe: Kimberley; Nuthall East & Strelley; Watnall & Nuthall West.

Nottingham: Aspley; Basford; Bestwood; Bulwell; Bulwell Forest; Leen Valley.

Nottingham South
Nottingham: Bilborough; Clifton East; Clifton West; Lenton & Wollaton East; Meadows; Radford; Wollaton West.

Rushcliffe
Rushcliffe: Abbey; Bunny; Compton Acres; Cotgrave; Cropwell; Edwalton; Gamston North; Gamston South; Gotham; Keyworth & Wolds; Lady Bay; Leake; Lutterell; Musters; Nevile & Langar; Radcliffe on Trent; Ruddington; Sutton Bonington; Tollerton; Trent Bridge.

Rutland and Stamford
Harborough: Billesdon & Tilton; Nevill; Thurnby & Houghton

Rutland: Barleythorpe; Braunston & Martinsthorpe; Cottesmore; Exton; Greetham; Ketton; Langham; Lyddington; Martinsthorpe; Normanton; Oakham North East; Oakham North West; Oakham South; Ryhall & Casterton; Uppingham; Whissendine.

South Kesteven: Casewick; Castle; Dole Wood; Glen; Isaac Newton; Stamford All Saints; Stamford St. George’s; Stamford St. John’s; Stamford St. Mary’s.

Sherwood Forest
Ashfield: Hucknall Central; Hucknall North; Hucknall South; Hucknall West.

Gedling: Calverton; Newstead Abbey.

Newark & Sherwood: Bilsthorpe; Boughton; Dover Beck; Edwinstowe & Clipstone; Farnsfield; Lowdham; Ollerton; Rainworth North & Rufford; Rainworth South & Blidworth.

Sleaford and North Hykeham
North Kesteven: Ashby de la Launde & Cranwell; Bassingham & Brant Broughton; Billinghay, Martin & North Kyme; Branston; Cliff Villages; Eagle, Swinderby & Witham St. Hughs; Heighington & Washingborough; Kirkby la Thorpe & South Kyme; Leasingham & Rauceby; Metheringham; North Hykeham Forum; North Hykeham Memorial; North Hykeham Mill; North Hykeham Moor; North Hykeham Witham; Ruskington; Sleaford Castle; Sleaford Holdingham; Sleaford Navigation; Sleaford Quarrington & Mareham; Sleaford Westholme; Waddington West.

South Derbyshire
South Derbyshire: Aston; Church Gresley; Etwall; Linton; Melbourne; Midway; Newhall & Stanton; Repton; Seales; Stenson; Swadlincote; Willington & Findern; Woodville.

South Holland and The Deepings
South Holland: Crowland & Deeping St Nicholas; Donington, Quadring & Gosberton; Fleet; Gedney; Holbeach Hurn; Holbeach Town; Long Sutton; Moulton, Weston & Cowbit; Pinchbeck & Surfleet; Spalding Castle; Spalding Monks House; Spalding St John’s; Spalding St Mary’s; Spalding St Paul’s; Spalding Wygate; Sutton Bridge; The Saints; Whaplode & Holbeach St John’s.

South Leicestershire
Blaby: Blaby South; Cosby with South Whetstone; Countesthorpe; Croft Hill; Enderby & St. John’s; Narborough & Littlethorpe; Normanton; North Whetstone; Pastures; Saxondale; Stanton & Flamville.

Harborough: Bosworth; Broughton Astley-Primethorpe & Sutton; Broughton Astley South & Leire; Dunton; Fleckney; Lutterworth East; Lutterworth West; Misterton; Ullesthorpe. South Kesteven: Deeping St. James; Market & West Deeping.

South Northamptonshire
North Northamptonshire: Irchester (polling districts WAA, WAB, WPA, WPB & WPC).

West Northamptonshire: Brackley; Bugbrooke; Deanshanger; Hackleton & Grange Park; Middleton Cheney; Silverstone (SAA, SAB, SAN, SAT, SBP, SBX, SCV, SDG, SDW, SDZ, SEF, SEW, SFE, SFF, SFN, SFO, SFR, SFW, SGD, SGF & SGK); Towcester & Roade.

Wellingborough and Rushden
North Northamptonshire: Brickhill & Queensway; Croyland & Swanspool; Finedon; Hatton Park; Higham Ferrers; Irchester (polling districts WIA & WIB); Irthlingborough (polling districts SD & SF); Rushden Pemberton West; Rushden South.

== East of England ==
Basildon and Billericay
Basildon: Billericay East; Billericay West; Burstead; Crouch; Fryerns; Laindon Park; Lee Chapel North; St. Martin’s; Vange.

Bedford
Bedford: Brickhill; Castle; Cauldwell; De Parys; Goldington; Harpur; Kempston Central & East; Kempston North; Kempston South; Kempston West; Kingsbrook; Newnham; Putnoe; Queens Park.

Braintree
Braintree: Bocking Blackwater; Bocking North; Bocking South; Braintree Central & Beckers Green; Braintree South; Braintree West; Bumpstead; Gosfield & Greenstead Green; Great Notley & Black Notley; Halstead St. Andrew’s; Halstead Trinity; Hedingham; Rayne; Stour Valley North; Stour Valley South; Three Fields; Yeldham.

Uttlesford: Felsted & Stebbing; The Sampfords.

Brentwood and Ongar
Brentwood: Brentwood North; Brentwood South; Brentwood West; Brizes & Doddinghurst; Herongate, Ingrave & West Horndon; Hutton Central; Hutton East; Hutton North; Hutton South; Ingatestone, Fryerning & Mountnessing; Pilgrims Hatch; Shenfield; South Weald; Tipps Cross; Warley.

Epping Forest: Chipping Ongar, Greensted & Marden Ash; High Ongar, Willingale & The Rodings; Lambourne; Moreton & Fyfield; North Weald Bassett; Passingford; Shelley.

Broadland and Fakenham
Broadland: Acle; Aylsham; Blofield with South Walsham; Brundall; Burlingham; Buxton; Coltishall; Eynesford; Great Witchingham; Hevingham; Horsford & Felthorpe; Marshes; Plumstead; Reepham; Spixworth with St. Faiths; Taverham North; Taverham South; Wroxham.

North Norfolk: Lancaster North; Lancaster South; Stibbard; The Raynhams; Walsingham.

Broxbourne
Broxbourne: Broxbourne & Hoddesdon South; Cheshunt North; Cheshunt South & Theobalds; Flamstead End; Goffs Oak; Hoddesdon North; Hoddesdon Town & Rye Park; Rosedale & Bury Green; Waltham Cross; Wormley & Turnford.

East Hertfordshire: Great Amwell; Hertford Heath; Stanstead Abbots.

Bury St Edmunds and Stowmarket
Mid Suffolk: Chilton; Combs Ford; Elmswell & Woolpit; Onehouse; Rattlesden; St. Peter’s; Stow Thorney; Thurston.

West Suffolk: Abbeygate; Bardwell; Barningham; Eastgate; Ixworth; Minden; Moreton Hall; Pakenham & Troston; Rougham; St. Olaves; Southgate; Stanton; The Fornhams & Great Barton; Tollgate; Westgate.

Cambridge
Cambridge: Abbey; Arbury; Castle; Coleridge; East Chesterton; King’s Hedges; Market; Newnham; Petersfield; Romsey; Trumpington; West Chesterton.

Castle Point
Basildon: Pitsea South East (polling district DN).

Castle Point: Appleton; Boyce; Canvey Island Central; Canvey Island East; Canvey Island North; Canvey Island South; Canvey Island West; Canvey Island Winter Gardens; Cedar Hall; St George's ; St James; St Mary's; St Peter's; Victoria.

Central Suffolk and North Ipswich
East Suffolk: Carlford & Fynn Valley; Framlingham; Kesgrave; Rushmere St. Andrew; Wickham Market.

Ipswich: Castle Hill; Whitehouse; Whitton.

Mid Suffolk: Battisford & Ringshall; Blakenham; Bramford; Claydon & Barham; Debenham; Needham Market; Stonham.

Chelmsford
Chelsmford: Chelmer Village & Beaulieu Park; Goat Hall; Great Baddow East; Great Baddow West; Marconi; Moulsham & Central; Moulsham Lodge; Patching Hall; St. Andrews; Springfield North; The Lawns; Trinity; Waterhouse Farm.

Clacton
Tendring: Bluehouse; Burrsville; Cann Hall; Coppins; Eastcliff; Frinton; Homelands; Kirby Cross; Kirby-le-Soken & Hamford; Little Clacton; Pier; St. Bartholomew’s; St. James; St. John’s; St. Osyth; St. Paul’s; The Bentleys & Frating; The Oakleys & Wix; Thorpe, Beaumont & Great Holland; Walton; Weeley & Tendring; West Clacton & Jaywick Sands.

Colchester
Colchester: Berechurch; Castle; Greenstead; Highwoods, Lexden & Braiswick (polling districts AQ, AS & AT); Mile End; New Town & Christ Church; Prettygate; St. Anne’s & St. John’s; Shrub End.

Dunstable and Leighton Buzzard
Central Bedfordshire: Dunstable–Central; Dunstable–Icknield; Dunstable–Manshead; Dunstable–Northfields; Dunstable–Watling; Heath & Reach; Houghton Hall; Leighton Buzzard North; Leighton Buzzard South; Linslade; Parkside; Tithe Farm.

Ely and East Cambridgeshire
East Cambridgeshire: Bottisham; Burwell; Downham Villages; Ely East; Ely North; Ely West; Fordham & Isleham; Haddenham; Littleport; Soham North; Soham South; Stretham; Sutton; Woodditton.

South Cambridgeshire: Cottenham; Milton & Waterbeach.

Epping Forest
Epping Forest: Broadley Common, Epping Upland & Nazeing; Buckhurst Hill East; Buckhurst Hill West; Chigwell Row; Chigwell Village; Epping Hemnall; Epping Lindsey & Thornwood Common; Grange Hill; Loughton Alderton; Loughton Broadway; Loughton Fairmead; Loughton Forest; Loughton Roding; Loughton St. John’s; Loughton St. Mary’s; Theydon Bois; Waltham Abbey High Beach; Waltham Abbey Honey Lane; Waltham Abbey North East; Waltham Abbey Paternoster; Waltham Abbey South West.

Great Yarmouth
Great Yarmouth: Bradwell North; Bradwell South & Hopton; Caister North; Caister South; Central & Northgate; Claydon; East Flegg; Fleggburgh; Gorleston; Lothingland; Magdalen; Nelson; Ormesby; St Andrews; Southtown & Cobholm; West Flegg; Yarmouth North.

Harlow
Epping Forest: Hastingwood, Matching & Sheering Village; Lower Nazeing; Lower Sheering; Roydon.

Harlow: Bush Fair; Church Langley; Great Parndon; Harlow Common; Little Parndon & Hare Street; Mark Hall; Netteswell; Old Harlow; Staple Tye; Sumners & Kingsmoor; Toddbrook.

Uttlesford: Broad Oak & the Hallingburys; Hatfield Heath.

Harpenden and Berkhamsted
Dacorum: Aldbury & Wigginton; Ashridge; Berkhamsted Castle; Berkhamsted East; Berkhamsted West; Northchurch; Tring Central; Tring East; Tring West & Rural; Watling.

St Albans: Harpenden East; Harpenden North; Harpenden South; Harpenden West; Redbourn; Sandridge; Wheathampstead.

Harwich and North Essex
Colchester: Lexden & Braiswick (polling districts EJ, ET & EU); Mersea & Pyefleet; Old Heath & The Hythe; Rural North; Wivenhoe.

Tendring: Alresford & Elmstead; Ardleigh & Little Bromley; Brightlingsea; Dovercourt All Saints; Dovercourt Bay; Dovercourt Tollgate; Dovercourt Vines & Parkeston; Harwich & Kingsway; Lawford, Manningtree & Mistley; Stour Valley.

Hemel Hempstead
Dacorum: Adeyfield East; Adeyfield West; Apsley and Corner Hall; Bennetts End; Bovingdon, Flaunden & Chipperfield; Boxmoor; Chaulden & Warners End; Gadebridge; Grovehill; Hemel Hempstead Town; Highfield; Leverstock Green; Nash Mills; Woodhall Farm.

Hertford and Stortford
East Hertfordshire: Bishop’s Stortford All Saints; Bishop’s Stortford Central; Bishop’s Stortford Meads; Bishop’s Stortford Silverleys; Bishop’s Stortford South; Hertford Bengeo; Hertford Castle; Hertford Kingsmead; Hertford Sele; Hunsdon; Much Hadham; Sawbridgeworth; Ware Chadwell; Ware Christchurch; Ware St. Mary’s; Ware Trinity.

Hertsmere
Hertsmere: Aldenham East; Aldenham West; Bentley Heath & The Royds; Borehamwood Brookmeadow; Borehamwood Cowley Hill; Borehamwood Hillside; Borehamwood Kenilworth; Bushey Heath; Bushey Park; Bushey St. James; Elstree; Potters Bar Furzefield; Potters Bar Oakmere; Potters Bar Parkfield; Shenley.

Welwyn Hatfield: Northaw & Cuffley.

Hitchin
Central Bedfordshire: Arlesey; Shefford; Stotfold & Langford.

North Hertfordshire: Cadwell; Chesfield; Hitchin Bearton; Hitchin Highbury; Hitchin Oughton; Hitchin Priory; Hitchin Walsworth; Hitchwood, Offa & Hoo; Kimpton.

Huntingdon
Huntingdonshire: Alconbury; Brampton; Buckden; Godmanchester & Hemingford Abbots; Great Staughton; Hemingford Grey & Houghton; Holywell-cum-Needingworth; Huntingdon East; Huntingdon North; Kimbolton; St. Ives East; St. Ives South; St. Ives West; Sawtry; Somersham; The Stukeleys; Warboys.

Ipswich
Ipswich: Alexandra; Bixley; Bridge; Gainsborough; Gipping; Holywells; Priory Heath; Rushmere; St. John’s; St. Margaret’s; Sprites; Stoke Park; Westgate.

Lowestoft
East Suffolk: Beccles & Worlingham; Carlton & Whitton; Carlton Colville; Gunton & St. Margarets; Harbour & Normanston; Kessingland; Kirkley & Pakefield; Lothingland; Oulton Broad.

Luton North
Luton: Barnfield, Bramingham, Challney, Icknield, Leagrave, Lewsey, Limbury, Northwell, Saints, Stopsley; Sundon Park.

Luton South and South Bedfordshire
Luton: Biscot; Crawley; Dallow; Farley; High Town; Round Green; South; Wigmore.

Central Bedfordshire: Caddington; Eaton Bray.

Maldon
Chelmsford: Bicknacre and East & West Hanningfield; Galleywood; Little Baddow, Danbury & Sandon; Rettendon & Runwell; South Hanningfield, Stock & Margaretting; South Woodham–Chetwood and Collingwood; South Woodham–Elmwood and Woodville.

Maldon: Althorne; Burnham-on-Crouch North; Burnham-on-Crouch South; Heybridge East; Heybridge West; Maldon East; Maldon North; Maldon South; Maldon West; Mayland; Purleigh; Southminster; Tillingham.

Mid Bedfordshire
Bedford: Elstow & Stewartby; Wilshamstead; Wootton.

Central Bedfordshire: Ampthill; Aspley & Woburn; Barton-le-Clay; Cranfield & Marston Moretaine; Flitwick; Houghton Conquest & Haynes; Silsoe & Shillington; Toddington; Westoning, Flitton & Greenfield.

Mid Norfolk
Breckland: All Saints & Wayland; Attleborough Burgh & Haverscroft; Attleborough Queens & Besthorpe; Dereham Neatherd; Dereham Toftwood; Dereham Withburga; Hermitage; Launditch; Lincoln; Mattishall; Necton; Saham Toney; Shipdham-with-Scarning; The Buckenhams & Banham; Upper Wensum; Watton.

South Norfolk: Hingham & Deopham; Wicklewood.

North Bedfordshire
Bedford: Bromham & Biddenham; Clapham; Eastcotts; Great Barford; Harrold; Kempston Rural; Oakley; Riseley; Sharnbrook; Wyboston.

Central Bedfordshire: Biggleswade North; Biggleswade South; Northill; Potton; Sandy.

North East Cambridgeshire
Fenland: Bassenhally; Benwick, Coates & Eastrea; Birch; Clarkson; Doddington & Wimblington; Elm & Christchurch; Kirkgate; Lattersey; Manea; March East; March North; March West; Medworth; Octavia Hill; Parson Drove & Wisbech St Mary; Peckover; Roman Bank; Slade Lode; St Andrews; Staithe; Stonald; The Mills; Waterlees Village; Wenneye.

North East Hertfordshire
East Hertfordshire: Braughing; Buntingford; Hertford Rural North; Hertford Rural South; Little Hadham; Mundens & Cottered; Puckeridge; Thundridge & Standon; Walkern; Watton-at-Stone.

North Hertfordshire: Arbury; Baldock East; Baldock Town; Ermine; Letchworth East; Letchworth Grange; Letchworth South East; Letchworth South West; Letchworth Wilbury; Royston Heath; Royston Meridian; Royston Palace; Weston & Sandon.

North Norfolk
North Norfolk: Bacton; Beeston Regis & The Runtons; Briston; Coastal; Cromer Town; Erpingham; Gresham; Happisburgh; Hickling; Holt; Hoveton & Tunstead; Mundesley; North Walsham East; North Walsham Market Cross; North Walsham West; Poppyland; Priory; Roughton; St. Benet’s; Sheringham North; Sheringham South; Stalham; Stody; Suffield Park; Trunch; Wells with Holkham; Worstead.

North West Cambridgeshire
Huntingdonshire: Ramsey; Stilton, Folksworth & Washingley; Yaxley.

Peterborough: Barnack; Fletton & Stanground; Fletton & Woodston; Glinton & Castor; Hampton Vale; Hargate & Hempsted; Orton Longueville; Orton Waterville; Stanground South; Wittering.

North West Essex
Chelmsford: Boreham & The Leighs; Broomfield & The Walthams; Chelmsford Rural West; Writtle.

Uttlesford: Ashdon; Clavering; Debden & Wimbish; Elsenham & Henham; Flitch Green & Little Dunmow; Great Dunmow North; Great Dunmow South & Barnston; High Easter & the Rodings; Littlebury, Chesterford & Wenden Lofts; Newport; Saffron Walden Audley; Saffron Walden Castle; Saffron Walden Shire; Stansted North; Stansted South & Birchanger; Stort Valley; Takeley; Thaxted & the Eastons.

North West Norfolk
King's Lynn and West Norfolk: Bircham with Rudhams; Brancaster; Burnham Market & Docking; Clenchwarton; Dersingham; Fairstead; Gayton & Grimston; Gaywood Chase; Gaywood Clock; Gaywood North Bank; Heacham; Hunstanton; Massingham with Castle Acre; North Lynn; St. Margaret’s with St. Nicholas; Snettisham; South & West Lynn; Springwood; Terrington; The Woottons; Walsoken, West Walton & Walpole; West Winch.

Norwich North
Broadland: Drayton North; Drayton South; Hellesdon North West; Hellesdon South East; Old Catton & Sprowston West; Sprowston Central; Sprowston East; Thorpe St. Andrew North West; Thorpe St. Andrew South East.

Norwich: Catton Grove; Crome; Mile Cross; Sewell.

Norwich South
Norwich: Bowthorpe; Eaton; Lakenham; Mancroft; Nelson; Thorpe Hamlet; Town Close; University; Wensum.

South Norfolk: New Costessey.

Peterborough
Peterborough: Bretton; Central; Dogsthorpe; East; Eye, Thorney & Newborough; Gunthorpe; North; Park; Paston & Walton; Ravensthorpe; Werrington; West.

Rayleigh and Wickford
Basildon: Wickford Castledon; Wickford North; Wickford Park.

Rochford: Downhall & Rawreth; Hawkwell East; Hawkwell West; Hockley; Hockley & Ashingdon; Hullbridge; Lodge; Sweyne Park & Grange; Trinity; Wheatley.

South Basildon and East Thurrock
Basildon: Langdon Hills; Nethermayne; Pitsea North West; Pitsea South East (polling districts DO, DP, DQ & DR).

Thurrock: Chadwell St. Mary; Corringham & Fobbing; East Tilbury; Orsett; Stanford East & Corringham Town; Stanford-le-Hope West; The Homesteads.

South Cambridgeshire
Cambridge: Cherry Hinton; Queen Edith’s.

South Cambridgeshire: Balsham; Barrington; Bassingbourn; Duxford; Fen Ditton & Fulbourn; Foxton; Gamlingay; Hardwick; Harston & Comberton; Linton; Melbourn; Sawston; Shelford; The Mordens; Whittlesford.

South Norfolk
South Norfolk: Brooke; Central Wymondham; Cringleford; Easton; Forncett; Hempnall; Hethersett; Loddon & Chedgrave; Mulbarton & Stoke Holy Cross; Newton Flotman; North Wymondham; Old Costessey; Poringland, Framinghams & Trowse; Rockland; South Wymondham; Stratton; Thurlton.

South Suffolk
Babergh: Assington; Box Vale; Brantham; Brett Vale; Bures St Mary & Nayland; Capel St Mary; Chadacre; Copdock & Washbrook; East Bergholt; Ganges; Great Cornard; Hadleigh North; Hadleigh South; Lavenham; Long Melford; North West Cosford; Orwell; South East Cosford; Sproughton & Pinewood; Stour; Sudbury North East; Sudbury North West; Sudbury South East; Sudbury South West.

South West Hertfordshire
Dacorum: Kings Langley.

Three Rivers: Abbots Langley and Bedmond; Carpenders Park; Chorleywood North & Sarratt; Chorleywood South & Maple Cross; Dickinsons; Durrants; Gade Valley; Leavesden; Moor Park & Eastbury; Oxhey Hall & Hayling; Penn & Mill End; Rickmansworth Town; South Oxhey.

South West Norfolk
Breckland: Ashill; Bedingfeld; Forest; Guiltcross; Harling & Heathlands; Nar Valley; Swaffham; Thetford Boudica; Thetford Burrell; Thetford Castle; Thetford Priory.

King's Lynn and West Norfolk: Airfield; Denver; Downham Old Town; East Downham; Emneth & Outwell; Feltwell; Methwold; North Downham; South Downham; Tilney, Mershe Lande & Wiggenhall; Upwell & Delph; Watlington; Wissey.

Southend East and Rochford
Rochford: Foulness & The Wakerings; Roche North & Rural; Roche South.

Southend-on-Sea: Kursaal; Milton; Shoeburyness; Southchurch; Thorpe; Victoria; West Shoebury.

Southend West and Leigh
Southend-on-Sea: Belfairs; Blenheim Park; Chalkwell; Eastwood Park; Leigh; Prittlewell; St. Laurence; St. Luke’s; West Leigh; Westborough.

Suffolk Coastal
East Suffolk: Aldeburgh & Leiston; Deben; Eastern Felixstowe; Kelsale & Yoxford; Martlesham & Purdis Farm; Melton; Orwell & Villages; Rendlesham & Orford; Saxmundham; Southwold; Western Felixstowe; Woodbridge; Wrentham, Wangford & Westleton.

St Albans
St Albans: Ashley; Batchwood; Clarence; Colney Heath; Cunningham; London Colney; Marshalswick North; Marshalswick South; Park Street; St. Peters; St. Stephen; Sopwell; Verulam.

St Neots and Mid Cambridgeshire
Huntingdonshire: Fenstanton; Great Paxton; St. Neots East; St. Neots Eatons; St. Neots Eynesbury; St. Neots Priory Park & Little Paxton.

South Cambridgeshire: Bar Hill; Caldecote; Cambourne; Caxton & Papworth; Girton; Histon & Impington; Longstanton; Over & Willingham; Swavesey.

Stevenage
East Hertfordshire: Datchworth & Aston.

North Hertfordshire: Codicote; Knebworth.

Stevenage: Bandley Hill; Bedwell; Chells; Longmeadow; Manor; Martins Wood; Old Town; Pin Green; Roebuck; St Nicholas; Shephall; Symonds Green; Woodfield.

Thurrock
Thurrock: Aveley & Uplands; Belhus; Chafford & North Stifford; Grays Riverside; Grays Thurrock; Little Thurrock Blackshots; Little Thurrock Rectory; Ockendon; South Chafford; Stifford Clays; Tilbury Riverside & Thurrock Park; Tilbury St. Chads; West Thurrock & South Stifford.

Watford
Hertsmere: Bushey North.

Watford: Callowland; Central; Holywell; Leggatts; Meriden; Nascot; Oxhey; Park; Stanborough; Tudor; Vicarage; Woodside.

Waveney Valley
East Suffolk: Bungay & Wainford; Halesworth & Blything.

Mid Suffolk: Bacton; Eye; Fressingfield; Gislingham; Haughley, Stowupland & Wetherden; Hoxne & Worlingworth; Mendlesham; Palgrave; Rickinghall; Stradbroke & Laxfield; Walsham-le-Willows.

South Norfolk: Beck Vale, Dickleburgh & Scole; Bressingham & Burston; Bunwell; Diss & Roydon; Ditchingham & Earsham; Harleston.

Welwyn Hatfield
Welwyn Hatfield: Brookmans Park & Little Heath; Haldens; Handside; Hatfield Central; Hatfield East; Hatfield South West; Hatfield Villages; Hollybush; Howlands; Panshanger; Peartree; Sherrards; Welham Green & Hatfield South; Welwyn East; Welwyn West.

West Suffolk
West Suffolk: Barrow; Brandon Central; Brandon East; Brandon West; Chedburgh & Chevington; Clare, Hundon & Kedington; Exning; Haverhill Central; Haverhill East; Haverhill North; Haverhill South; Haverhill South East; Haverhill West; Horringer; Iceni; Kentford & Moulton; Lakenheath; Manor; Mildenhall Great Heath; Mildenhall Kingsway & Market; Mildenhall Queensway; Newmarket East; Newmarket North; Newmarket West; Risby; The Rows; Whepstead & Wickhambrook; Withersfield.

Witham
Braintree: Coggeshall; Hatfield Peverel & Terling; Kelvedon & Feering; Silver End & Cressing; The Colnes; Witham Central; Witham North; Witham South; Witham West.

Colchester: Marks Tey & Layer; Stanway; Tiptree.

Maldon: Great Totham; Tollesbury; Tollesbury D’arcy; Wickham Bishops & Woodham. South Cambridgeshire: Bar Hill; Caldecote; Cambourne; Caxton & Papworth; Girton; Histon & Impington; Longstanton; Over & Willingham; Swavesey.

== Greater London ==
Barking
Barking and Dagenham: Abbey; Alibon; Becontree; Eastbury; Gascoigne; Goresbrook; Longbridge; Mayesbrook; Parsloes; Thames.

Battersea
Wandsworth: Balham; Fairfield (polling district FFD); Latchmere; Northcote; Queenstown; St. Mary’s Park; Shaftesbury.

Beckenham and Penge
Bromley: Clock House; Copers Cope; Crystal Palace; Kelsey & Eden Park; Penge & Cator; Shortlands; West Wickham.

Bermondsey and Old Southwark
Southwark: Borough & Bankside; Chaucer; London Bridge & West Bermondsey; North Bermondsey; Rotherhithe; St. George’s; South Bermondsey; Surrey Docks.

Bethnal Green and Stepney
Tower Hamlets: Bethnal Green; St. Dunstan’s; St. Peter’s; Shadwell; Spitalfields & Banglatown; Stepney Green; Weavers; Whitechapel.

Bexleyheath and Crayford
Bexley: Barnehurst; Bexleyheath; Crayford; Crook Log; Northumberland Heath; Slade Green & Northend; West Heath.

Brent East
Brent: (Note: Wards as they existed on 2 May 2022.) Brondesbury Park; Cricklewood & Mapesbury; Dollis Hill; Kingsbury; Roundwood; Stonebridge; Welsh Harp; Willesden Green.

Brent West
Brent: Alperton; Barnhill; Kenton; Northwick Park; Preston; Sudbury; Tokyngton; Wembley Central; Wembley Hill; Wembley Park.

Brentford and Isleworth
Hounslow: Brentford East; Brentford West; Heston East; Hounslow Central; Hounslow East; Hounslow Heath; Hounslow South; Isleworth; Osterley & Spring Grove; Syon & Brentford Lock.

Richmond upon Thames: Whitton.

Bromley and Biggin Hill
Bromley: Bickley; Biggin Hill; Bromley Common & Keston; Bromley Town; Darwin (part of polling district DA1); Hayes & Coney Hall; Plaistow & Sundridge.

Carshalton and Wallington
Sutton: Beddington; Carshalton Central; Carshalton South & Clockhouse; Hackbridge; St. Helier East; St. Helier West; South Beddington & Roundshaw; The Wrythe; Wallington North; Wallington South.

Chelsea and Fulham
Hammersmith and Fulham: Fulham Reach; Fulham Town; Lillie; Munster; Palace & Hurlingham; Parsons Green & Sandford; Sands End; Walham Green; West Kensington.

Kensington and Chelsea: Chelsea Riverside; Redcliffe; Royal Hospital; Stanley.

Chingford and Woodford Green
Redbridge: Bridge; Churchfields; Monkhams.

Waltham Forest: Chingford Green; Endlebury; Hale End & Highams Park; Hatch Lane; Larkswood; Valley.

Chipping Barnet
Barnet: Barnet Vale; Brunswick Park; East Barnet; Edgwarebury; High Barnet; Totteridge & Woodside; Underhill; Whetstone.

Cities of London and Westminster
City of London: Aldersgate; Aldgate; Bassishaw; Billingsgate; Bishopsgate; Bread Street; Bridge & Bridge Without; Broad Street; Candlewick; Castle Baynard; Cheap; Coleman Street; Cordwainer; Cornhill; Cripplegate; Dowgate; Farringdon Within; Farringdon Without; Langbourn; Lime Street; Portsoken; Queenhithe; Tower; Vintry; Walbrook.

Westminster: Abbey Road; Hyde Park; Knightsbridge & Belgravia; Marylebone; Pimlico North; Pimlico South; Regent’s Park; St. James’s; Vincent Square; West End.

Clapham and Brixton Hill
Lambeth: Brixton Hill; Clapham Common; Clapham Town; Ferndale; Larkhall; Thornton; Tulse Hill.

Croydon East
Croydon: Addiscombe East; Addiscombe West; New Addington North; New Addington South; Selsdon & Addington Village; Selsdon Vale & Forestdale; Shirley North; Shirley South; Woodside (polling districts WDS2, WDS3, WDS4, WDS5 and WDS6).

Croydon South
Croydon: Coulsdon Town; Kenley; Old Coulsdon; Park Hill & Whitgift; Purley & Woodcote; Purley Oaks & Riddlesdown; Sanderstead; South Croydon.

Croydon West
Croydon: Bensham Manor; Broad Green; Fairfield; Selhurst; South Norwood; Waddon; West Thornton; Woodside (polling district WDS1).

Dagenham and Rainham
Baring and Dagenham: Eastbrook; Heath; River; Valence; Village; Whalebone.

Havering: Elm Park; Hacton (part of polling district HN5); Rainham & Wennington; St. Andrew’s (part of polling district ST5); South Hornchurch.

Dulwich and West Norwood
Lambeth: Coldharbour; Gipsy Hill; Herne Hill; Knight’s Hill; Thurlow Park.

Southwark: Champion Hill; Dulwich Village; Dulwich Wood.

Dulwich and West Norwood
Ealing: Ealing Broadway; Ealing Common; East Acton; Hanger Hill; North Acton; South Acton; Southfield.

Hammersmith and Fulham: College Park & Old Oak; Wormholt.

Ealing North
Ealing: Central Greenford; Greenford Broadway; North Greenford; North Hanwell; Northolt Mandeville; Northolt West End; Perivale; Pitshanger.

Ealing Southall
Ealing: Dormers Wells; Hanwell Broadway; Lady Margaret; Northfield; Norwood Green; Southall Broadway; Southall Green; Southall West; Walpole.

East Ham
Newham: Boleyn; East Ham Central; East Ham North; East Ham South; Green Street East; Little Ilford; Manor Park; Wall End.

Edmonton and Winchmore Hill
Enfield: Bush Hill Park; Edmonton Green; Grange Park; Haselbury; Highfield; Jubilee; Lower Edmonton; Upper Edmonton; Winchmore Hill.

Eltham and Chislehurst
Bromley: Chislehurst; Mottingham & Chislehurst North.

Greenwich: Coldharbour & New Eltham; Eltham North; Eltham South; Eltham West; Kidbrooke with Hornfair; Middle Park & Sutcliffe.

Enfield North
Enfield: Brimsdown; Bullsmoor; Carterhatch; Enfield Lock; Ponders End; Ridgeway; Southbury; Town; Whitewebbs.

Erith and Thamesmead
Bexley: Belvedere; Erith; Thamesmead East.

Greenwich: Abbey Wood; Glyndon; Plumstead; Shooters Hill; Thamesmead Moorings.

Feltham and Heston
Hounslow: Bedfont; Cranford; Feltham North; Feltham West; Hanworth Park; Hanworth Village; Heston Central; Heston West; Hounslow West.

Finchley and Golders Green
Barnet: Childs Hill; Cricklewood; East Finchley; Finchley Church End; Garden Suburb; Golders Green; West Finchley; Woodhouse.

Greenwich and Woolwich
Greenwich: Blackheath Westcombe; Charlton; Greenwich West; Peninsula; Woolwich Common; Woolwich Riverside.

Hackney North and Stoke Newington
Hackney: Cazenove; Clissold; Hackney Downs; King’s Park; Lea Bridge; Shacklewell; Springfield; Stamford Hill West; Stoke Newington.

Hackney South and Shoreditch
Hackney: Dalston; Hackney Central; Hackney Wick; Haggerston; Homerton; Hoxton East & Shoreditch; Hoxton West; London Fields; Victoria.

Hammersmith and Chiswick
Hammersmith and Fulham: Addison; Avonmore; Brook Green; Coningham; Grove; Hammersmith Broadway; Ravenscourt; Shepherd’s Bush Green; Wendell Park; White City.

Hounslow: Chiswick Gunnersbury; Chiswick Homefields; Chiswick Riverside.

Hampstead and Highgate
Camden: Belsize; Fortune Green; Frognal; Gospel Oak; Hampstead Town; Highgate; Kilburn; Primrose Hill (polling districts TA and TC); South Hampstead; West Hampstead.

Haringey: Highgate.

Harrow East
Brent: Queensbury.

Harrow: Belmont; Canons; Centenary; Edgware; Harrow Weald; Kenton East; Kenton West; Stanmore.

Harrow West
Harrow: Greenhill; Harrow on the Hill; Headstone; Marlborough; North Harrow; Rayners Lane; Roxbourne; Roxeth; Wealdstone North; Wealdstone South; West Harrow.

Hayes and Harlington
Hillingdon: Belmore; Charville; Hayes Town; Heathrow Villages; Pinkwell; West Drayton; Wood End; Yeading.

Hendon
Barnet: Burnt Oak; Colindale North; Colindale South; Edgware; Hendon; Mill Hill; West Hendon.

Holborn and St. Pancras
Camden: Bloomsbury; Camden Square; Camden Town; Haverstock; Holborn & Covent Garden; Kentish Town North; Kentish Town South; King’s Cross; Primrose Hill (polling district TB); Regent’s Park; St. Pancras & Somers Town.

Hornchurch and Upminster
Havering: Cranham; Emerson Park (polling districts EM1, EM2 (part), EM3, EM4 (part) & EM5); Gooshays; Hacton (polling districts HN1, HN2, HN3, HN4 & HN5 (part)); Harold Wood; Heaton; St. Andrew’s (polling districts ST1, ST2, ST3, ST4 & ST5 (part)); Upminster.

Hornsey and Friern Barnet
Barnet: Friern Barnet.

Haringey: Alexandra Park; Crouch End; Fortis Green; Harringay; Hornsey; Muswell Hill; Stroud Green.

Ilford North
Redbridge: Aldborough; Barkingside; Clayhall; Cranbrook; Fairlop; Fullwell; Hainault; Valentines.

Ilford South
Barking and Dagenham: Chadwell Heath.

Redbridge: Chadwell; Clementswood; Goodmayes; Ilford Town; Loxford; Mayfield; Newbury; Seven Kings.

Islington North
Islington: Arsenal; Finsbury Park; Highbury; Hillrise; Junction; Mildmay; Tollington; Tufnell Park.

Islington South and Finsbury
Hackney: De Beauvoir.

Islington: Barnsbury; Bunhill; Caledonian; Canonbury; Clerkenwell; Holloway; Laycock; St. Mary’s & St. James’; St. Peter’s & Canalside.

Kensington and Bayswater
Kensington and Chelsea: Abingdon; Brompton & Hans Town; Campden; Colville; Courtfield; Dalgarno; Earl’s Court; Golborne; Holland; Norland; Notting Dale; Pembridge; Queen’s Gate; St. Helen’s.

Westminster: Bayswater; Lancaster Gate.

Kingston and Surbiton
Kingston upon Thames: Alexandra; Berrylands; Beverley; Chessington North & Hook; Chessington South; Coombe Vale; Grove; Norbiton; St. Mark’s; Surbiton Hill; Tolworth & Hook Rise.

Lewisham East
Lewisham: Bellingham; Catford South; Downham; Grove Park; Hither Green; Lee Green; Rushey Green.

Lewisham North
Lewisham: Blackheath; Brockley; Deptford; Evelyn; Ladywell; Lewisham Central; New Cross Gate; Telegraph Hill.

Lewisham West and East Dulwich
Lewisham: Crofton Park; Forest Hill; Perry Vale; Sydenham.

Southwark: Dulwich Hill; Goose Green; Peckham Rye.

Leyton and Wanstead
Redbridge: South Woodford; Wanstead Park; Wanstead Village.

Waltham Forest: Cann Hall; Cathall; Forest; Grove Green; Leyton; Leytonstone.

Mitcham and Morden
Merton: Cannon Hill; Colliers Wood; Cricket Green; Figge’s Marsh; Graveney; Lavender Fields; Longthornton; Lower Morden; Pollards Hill; Ravensbury; St. Helier.

Old Bexley and Sidcup
Bexley: Blackfen & Lamorbey; Blendon & Penhill; East Wickham; Falconwood & Welling; Longlands; St. Mary’s & St. James; Sidcup.

Orpington
Bromley: Chelsfield & Pratts Bottom; Cray Valley East; Cray Valley West; Darwin (polling districts DA2, DA3, DA4, DA5 (part), DA6 & DA7 (part)); Farnborough & Crofton; Orpington; Petts Wood & Knoll.

Peckham
Southwark: Faraday; North Walworth; Nunhead & Queen’s Road; Old Kent Road; Peckham; Rye Lane; St. Giles.

Poplar and Limehouse
Tower Hamlets: Blackwall & Cubitt Town; Bromley South; Canary Wharf; Island Gardens; Lansbury; Limehouse; Mile End; Poplar; St. Katharine’s & Wapping.

Putney
Wandsworth: East Putney; Fairfield (polling districts FFA, FFB & FFC); Roehampton & Putney Heath; Southfields; Thamesfield; West Hill; West Putney.

Queen's Park and Maida Vale
Brent: Harlesden & Kensal Green; Kilburn; Queens Park.

Westminster: Church Street; Harrow Road; Little Venice; Maida Vale; Queen’s Park; Westbourne.

Richmond Park
Kingston upon Thames: Canbury; Coombe Hill; Tudor.

Richmond upon Thames: Barnes; East Sheen; Ham, Petersham & Richmond Riverside; Kew; Mortlake & Barnes Common; North Richmond; South Richmond.

Romford
Havering: Brooklands; Emerson Park (polling district EM2 (part) & EM4 (part)); Havering Park; Hylands; Mawneys; Pettits; Romford Town; Squirrel’s Heath.

Ruislip, Northwood and Pinner
Harrow: Hatch End; Pinner; Pinner South.

Hillingdon: Eastcote; Harefield Village; Northwood; Northwood Hills; Ruislip.

Southgate and Wood Green
Enfield: Arnos Grove; Bowes; Cockfosters; New Southgate; Oakwood; Palmers Green; Southgate.

Haringey: Bounds Green; Noel Park; White Hart Lane; Woodside.

Stratford and Bow
Newham: Forest Gate North; Forest Gate South; Green Street West; Stratford & New Town.

Tower Hamlet: Bow East; Bow West; Bromley North.

Streatham and Croydon North
Croydon: Crystal Palace & Upper Norwood; Norbury & Pollards Hill; Norbury Park; Thornton Heath.

Lambeth: St. Leonard’s; Streatham Hill; Streatham South; Streatham Wells.

Sutton and Cheam
Sutton: Belmont; Cheam; North Cheam; Stonecot; Sutton Central; Sutton North; Sutton South; Sutton West & East Cheam; Worcester Park North; Worcester Park South.

Tooting
Wandsworth: Bedford; Earlsfield; Furzedown; Graveney; Nightingale; Tooting; Wandsworth Common.

Tottenham
Hackney: Brownswood; Woodberry Down.

Haringey: Bruce Castle; Hermitage & Gardens; Northumberland Park; St. Ann’s; Seven Sisters; South Tottenham; Tottenham Central; Tottenham Hale; West Green.

Twickenham
Richmond upon Thames: Fulwell & Hampton Hill; Hampton; Hampton North; Hampton Wick & South Teddington; Heathfield; St. Margarets & North Twickenham; South Twickenham; Teddington; Twickenham Riverside; West Twickenham.

Uxbridge and South Ruislip
Hillingdon: Colham & Cowley; Hillingdon East; Hillingdon West; Ickenham & South Harefield; Ruislip Manor; South Ruislip; Uxbridge; Yiewsley.

Vauxhall and Camberwell Green
Lambeth: Bishop’s; Oval; Prince’s; Stockwell; Vassall.

Southwark: Camberwell Green; Newington.

Walthamstow
Waltham Forest: Chapel End; High Street; Higham Hill; Hoe Street; Lea Bridge; Markhouse; William Morris; Wood Street.

West Ham and Beckton
Newham: Beckton; Canning Town North; Canning Town South; Custom House; Plaistow North; Plaistow South; Royal Docks; West Ham.

Wimbledon
Kingston upon Thames: Old Malden; St. James.

Merton: Abbey; Hillside; Merton Park; Raynes Park; Village; Wandle; West Barnes; Wimbledon Park; Wimbledon Town & Dundonald.

== North East England ==
Bishop Auckland
Durham: Barnard Castle East; Barnard Castle West; Bishop Auckland Town; Coundon; Crook; Evenwood; Shildon & Dene Valley; Tow Law; Weardale; West Auckland; Woodhouse Close.

Blaydon and Consett
Durham: Benfieldside; Burnopfield and Dipton; Consett North; Consett South; Delves Lane; Leadgate & Medomsley.

Gateshead: Blaydon; Chopwell & Rowlands Gill; Crawcrook & Greenside; Ryton, Crookhill & Stella; Winlaton & High Spen.

Blyth and Ashington
Northumberland: Ashington Central; Bedlington Central; Bedlington East; Bedlington West; Bothal; Choppington; College; Cowpen; Croft; Haydon; Hirst; Isabella; Kitty Brewster; Newbiggin Central & East; Newsham; Plessey; Seaton with Newbiggin West; Sleekburn; South Blyth; Stakeford; Wensleydale.

City of Durham
Durham: Belmont; Brandon; Deerness; Durham South; Elvet & Gilesgate; Esh & Witton Gilbert; Framwellgate & Newton Hall; Neville’s Cross; Sherburn; Willington & Hunwick.

Cramlington and Killingworth
Northumberland: Cramlington East; Cramlington Eastfield; Cramlington North; Cramlington South East; Cramlington Village; Cramlington West; Hartley; Holywell; Seghill with Seaton Delaval.

Newcastle upon Tyne: Castle (polling districts F01, F02 & F03).

North Tyneside: Camperdown; Killingworth; Valley; Weetslade.

Darlington
Darlington: Bank Top & Lascelles; Brinkburn & Faverdale; Cockerton; College; Eastbourne; Harrowgate Hill; Haughton & Springfield; Heighington & Coniscliffe; Hummersknott; Mowden; North Road; Northgate; Park East; Park West; Pierremont; Red Hall & Lingfield; Stephenson; Whinfield.

Easington
Durham: Blackhalls; Dawdon; Deneside; Easington; Horden; Murton; Passfield; Peterlee East; Peterlee West; Seaham; Shotton and South Hetton; Trimdon and Thornley (polling districts DKC, EEA, SNA, SNB & SNC); Wingate.

Gateshead Central and Whickham
Gateshead: Bridges; Chowdene; Deckham; Dunston & Teams; Dunston Hill & Whickham East; High Fell; Lobley Hill & Bensham; Low Fell; Saltwell; Whickham North; Whickham South & Sunniside.

Hartlepool
Hartlepool: Burn Valley; De Bruce; Fens & Rossmere; Foggy Furze; Hart; Headland & Harbour; Jesmond; Manor House; Rural West; Seaton; Victoria.

Hexham
Northumberland: Bellingham; Bywell; Corbridge; Haltwhistle; Haydon & Hadrian; Hexham Central with Acomb; Hexham East; Hexham West; Humshaugh; Longhorsley; Ponteland East & Stannington; Ponteland North; Ponteland South with Heddon; Ponteland West; Prudhoe North; Prudhoe South; South Tyneside; Stocksfield & Broomhaugh.

Newcastle-upon-Tyne: Callerton & Throckley.

Houghton and Sunderland South
Sunderland: Copt Hill; Doxford; Hetton; Houghton; St. Anne’s; St. Chad’s; Sandhill; Shiney Row; Silksworth.

Jarrow and Gateshead East
Gateshead: Felling; Pelaw & Heworth; Wardley & Leam Lane; Windy Nook & Whitehills.

South Tyneside: Bede; Boldon Colliery; Fellgate & Hedworth; Hebburn North; Hebburn South; Monkton; Primrose.

Middlesbrough and Thornaby East
Middlesbrough: Acklam; Ayresome; Berwick Hills & Pallister; Brambles & Thorntree; Central; Kader; Linthorpe; Longlands & Beechwood; Newport; North Ormesby; Park; Trimdon.

Stockton-on-Tees: Mandale & Victoria; Stainsby Hill.

Middlesbrough South and East Cleveland
Middlesbrough: Coulby Newham; Hemlington; Ladgate; Marton East; Marton West; Nunthorpe; Park End & Beckfield; Stainton & Thornton.

Redcar and Cleveland: Belmont; Brotton; Guisborough; Hutton; Lockwood; Loftus; Skelton East; Skelton West.

Newcastle upon Tyne Central and West
Newcastle upon Tyne: Arthur’s Hill; Benwell & Scotswood; Blakelaw; Chapel; Denton & Westerhope; Elswick; Kingston Park South & Newbiggin Hall (polling districts O01, O02 & O03); Lemington; Monument; West Fenham; Wingrove.

Newcastle upon Tyne East and Wallsend
Newcastle upon Tyne: Byker; Heaton; Manor Park; Ouseburn; Walker; Walkergate.

North Tyneside: Battle Hill; Howdon; Northumberland; Riverside (polling districts FA & FB); Wallsend.

Newcastle upon Tyne North
Newcastle upon Tyne: Castle (polling districts F04, F05 & F06); Dene & South Gosforth; Fawdon & West Gosforth; Gosforth; Kenton; Kingston Park South & Newbiggin Hall (polling district O04); North Jesmond; Parklands; South Jesmond.

North Tyneside: Benton; Longbenton.

Newton Aycliffe and Spennymoor
Durham: Aycliffe East; Aycliffe North and Middridge; Aycliffe West; Bishop Middleham and Cornforth; Chilton; Coxhoe; Ferryhill; Sedgefield; Spennymoor; Trimdon & Thornley (polling districts SKB, SLA, SLB, SMB & SMC); Tudhoe.

North Durham
Durham: Annfield Plain; Chester-le-Street East; Chester-le-Street North; Chester-le-Street South; Chester-le-Street West Central; Craghead & South Moor; Lanchester; Lumley; North Lodge; Pelton; Sacriston; Stanley; Tanfield.

North Northumberland
Northumberland: Alnwick; Amble; Amble West with Warkworth; Bamburgh; Berwick East; Berwick North; Berwick West with Ord; Druridge Bay; Longhoughton; Lynemouth; Morpeth Kirkhill; Morpeth North; Morpeth Stobhill; Norham & Islandshires; Pegswood; Rothbury; Shilbottle; Wooler.

Redcar
Redcar and Cleveland: Coatham; Dormanstown; Eston; Grangetown; Kirkleatham; Longbeck; Newcomen; Normanby; Ormesby; St. Germain’s; Saltburn; South Bank; Teesville; West Dyke; Wheatlands; Zetland.

South Shields
South Tyneside: Beacon & Bents; Biddick & All Saints; Cleadon & East Boldon; Cleadon Park; Harton; Horsley Hill; Simonside & Rekendyke; West Park; Westoe; Whitburn & Marsden; Whiteleas.

Stockton North
Stockton-on-Tees: Billingham Central; Billingham East; Billingham North; Billingham South; Billingham West; Hardwick & Salters Lane; Newtown; Northern Parishes; Norton North; Norton South; Norton West; Parkfield & Oxbridge; Roseworth; Stockton Town Centre.

Stockton West
Darlington: Hurworth; Sadberge & Middleton St. George.

Stockton-on-Tees: Bishopsgarth & Elm Tree; Eaglescliffe; Fairfield; Grangefield; Hartburn; Ingleby Barwick East; Ingleby Barwick West; Village; Western Parishes; Yarm.

Sunderland Central
Sunderland: Barnes; Fulwell; Hendon; Millfield; Pallion; Ryhope; St. Michael’s; St. Peter’s; Southwick.

Tynemouth
North Tyneside: Chirton; Collingwood; Cullercoats; Monkseaton North; Monkseaton South; Preston; Riverside (polling districts FC, FD, FE, FF, FG & FH); St Mary's; Tynemouth; Whitley Bay.

Washington and Gateshead South
Gateshead: Birtley; Lamesley.

Sunderland: Castle; Redhill; Washington Central; Washington East; Washington North; Washington South; Washington West.

== North West England ==
Altrincham and Sale West
Trafford: Altrincham; Ashton upon Mersey; Bowdon; Broadheath; Hale Barns; Hale Central; St. Mary’s; Timperley; Village.

Ashton-under-Lyne
Tameside: Ashton Hurst; Ashton St. Michael’s; Ashton Waterloo; Audenshaw; Droylsden East; Droylsden West; Dukinfield; St. Peter’s.

Barrow and Furness
Barrow-in-Furness: Barrow Island; Central; Dalton North; Dalton South; Hawcoat; Hindpool; Newbarns; Ormsgill; Parkside; Risedale; Roosecote; Walney North; Walney South.

Copeland: Black Combe & Scafell; Millom.

South Lakeland: Broughton & Coniston (polling districts AHA, AHB, AHC, BZ, CA, CB, CL & CY); Furness Peninsula; Ulverston East; Ulverston West.

Birkenhead
Wirral: Bebington; Bidston & St. James; Birkenhead & Tranmere; Claughton; Oxton; Prenton; Rock Ferry.

Blackburn
Blackburn with Darwen: Audley & Queen’s Park; Bastwell & Daisyfield; Billinge & Beardwood; Blackburn Central; Blackburn South East; Ewood; Little Harwood & Whitebirk; Livesey with Pleasington; Mill Hill & Moorgate; Roe Lee; Shear Brow & Corporation Park; Wensley Fold.

Blackley and Middleton South
Manchester: Charlestown; Crumpsall; Harpurhey; Higher Blackley; Moston.

Rochdale: East Middleton; South Middleton.

Blackpool North and Fleetwood
Blackpool: Anchorsholme; Bispham; Greenlands; Ingthorpe; Norbreck.

Wyre: Bourne; Carleton; Cleveleys Park; Jubilee; Marsh Mill; Mount; Park; Pharos; Pheasant’s Wood; Rossall; Stanah; Victoria & Norcross; Warren.

Blackpool South
Blackpool: Bloomfield; Brunswick; Claremont; Clifton; Hawes Side; Highfield; Layton; Marton; Park; Squires Gate; Stanley; Talbot; Tyldesley; Victoria; Warbreck; Waterloo.

Bolton North East
Bolton: Astley Bridge; Bradshaw; Breightmet; Bromley Cross; Crompton; Halliwell; Little Lever & Darcy Lever; Tonge with the Haulgh.

Bolton South and Walkden
Bolton: Farnworth; Great Lever; Harper Green; Kearsley; Rumworth.

Salford: Little Hulton; Walkden North; Walkden South.

Bolton West
Bolton: Heaton & Lostock; Horwich & Blackrod; Horwich North East; Hulton; Smithills; Westhoughton North & Chew Moor; Westhoughton South.

Bootle
Sefton: Church; Derby; Ford; Linacre; Litherland; Netherton & Orrell; St. Oswald; Victoria.

Burnley
Burnley: Bank Hall; Briercliffe; Brunshaw; Cliviger with Worsthorne; Coal Clough with Deerplay; Daneshouse with Stoneyholme; Gannow; Gawthorpe; Hapton with Park; Lanehead; Queensgate; Rosegrove with Lowerhouse; Rosehill with Burnley Wood; Trinity; Whittlefield with Ightenhill.

Pendle: Brierfield East & Clover Hill; Brierfield West & Reedley.

Bury North
Bury: Church; East; Elton; Moorside; North Manor; Radcliffe North; Ramsbottom; Redvales; Tottington.

Bury South
Bury: Besses; Holyrood; Pilkington Park; Radcliffe East; Radcliffe West; St. Mary’s; Sedgley; Unsworth.

Salford: Kersal & Broughton Park.

Carlisle
Carlisle: Belah & Kingmoor; Botcherby & Harraby North; Brampton & Fellside; Cathedral & Castle; Currock & Upperby; Denton Holme & Morton South; Harraby South & Parklands; Longtown & the Border; Newtown & Morton North; Sandsfield & Morton West; Stanwix & Houghton; Wetheral & Corby.

Cheadle
Stockport: Bramhall North; Bramhall South & Woodford; Cheadle & Gatley; Cheadle Hulme North; Cheadle Hulme South; Heald Green; Stepping Hill.

Chester North and Neston
Cheshire West and Chester: Blacon; Chester City & the Garden Quarter; Great Boughton; Little Neston; Neston; Newton & Hoole; Parkgate; Saughall & Mollington; Upton; Willaston & Thornton.

Chester South and Eddisbury
Cheshire East: Audlem; Bunbury; Wrenbury; Wybunbury.

Cheshire West and Chester: Christleton & Huntington; Farndon; Handbridge Park; Lache; Malpas; Tarporley; Tarvin & Kelsall; Tattenhall; Weaver & Cuddington.

Chorley
Chorley: Adlington & Anderton; Buckshaw & Whittle; Chorley East; Chorley North & Astley; Chorley North East; Chorley North West; Chorley South East & Heath Charnock; Chorley South West; Clayton East, Brindle & Hoghton; Clayton West & Cuerden; Coppull; Euxton.

Congleton
Cheshire East: Alsager; Brereton Rural; Congleton East; Congleton West; Dane Valley; Odd Rode; Sandbach Elworth; Sandbach Ettiley Heath & Wheelock; Sandbach Heath & East; Sandbach Town.

Crewe and Nantwich
Cheshire East: Crewe Central; Crewe East; Crewe North; Crewe South; Crewe St. Barnabas; Crewe West; Haslington; Leighton; Nantwich North & West; Nantwich South & Stapeley; Shavington; Willaston & Rope; Wistaston.

Ellesmere Port and Bromborough
Cheshire West and Chester: Central & Grange; Ledsham & Manor; Netherpool; Strawberry; Sutton Villages; Westminster; Whitby Groves; Whitby Park; Wolverham.

Wirral: Bromborough; Eastham.

Fylde
Fylde: Ansdell; Ashton; Central; Clifton; Elswick & Little Eccleston; Fairhaven; Freckleton East; Freckleton West; Heyhouses; Kilnhouse; Kirkham North; Kirkham South; Medlar-with-Wesham; Newton & Treales; Park; Ribby-with-Wrea; Singleton & Greenhalgh; Staining & Weeton; St Johns; St Leonards; Warton & Westby.

Wyre: Breck; Hardhorn with High Cross; Tithebarn.

Gorton and Denton
Manchester: Burnage; Gorton & Abbey Hey; Levenshulme; Longsight.

Tameside: Denton North East; Denton South; Denton West.

Hazel Grove
Stockport: Bredbury & Woodley; Bredbury Green & Romiley; Hazel Grove; Manor; Marple North; Marple South & High Lane; Offerton.

Heywood and Middleton North
Rochdale: Bamford; Castleton; Hopwood Hall; Norden; North Heywood; North Middleton; Spotland & Falinge; West Heywood; West Middleton.

Hyndburn
Hyndburn: Altham; Barnfield; Baxenden; Central; Church; Clayton-le-Moors; Huncoat; Immanuel; Milnshaw; Netherton; Overton; Peel; Rishton; St Andrew's; St Oswald's; Spring Hill.

Rossendale: Greenfield; Worsley.

Knowsley
Knowsley: Cherryfield; Northwood; Prescot North; Roby; St. Gabriels; St. Michaels; Shevington; Stockbridge; Whitefield.

Lancaster and Wyre
Lancaster: Bulk; Castle; Ellel; John O’Gaunt; Marsh; Scotforth East; Scotforth West; Skerton East; Skerton West; University & Scotforth Rural.

Wyre: Brock with Catterall; Calder; Garstang; Great Eccleston; Hambleton & Stalmine; Pilling; Preesall; Wyresdale.

Leigh and Atherton
Wigan: Atherleigh (polling districts LCA (part), LCB, LCC, LCD & LCE); Atherton; Golborne & Lowton West; Leigh East; Leigh South; Leigh West (polling districts LDB, LDC, LDD, LDE & LDF); Lowton East; Tyldesley.

Liverpool Garston
Liverpool: Allerton & Hunts Cross; Belle Vale; Church; Cressington; Speke-Garston; Woolton.

Liverpool Riverside
Liverpool: Anfield; Central; Everton; Kirkdale; Princes Park; Riverside.

Liverpool Walton
Liverpool: Clubmoor; County; Croxteth; Fazakereley; Norris Green; Warbreck.

Sefton: Molyneux (polling districts C4, C5 & C6).

Liverpool Wavertree
Liverpool: Childwall; Greenbank; Kensington & Fairfield; Mossley Hill; Picton; St. Michael’s; Wavertree.

Liverpool West Derby
Knowsley: Page Moss; Swanside.

Liverpool: Knotty Ash; Old Swan; Tuebrook & Stoneycroft; West Derby; Yew Tree.

Macclesfield
Cheshire East: Bollington; Broken Cross & Upton; Disley; Gawsworth; Macclesfield Central; Macclesfield East; Macclesfield Hurdsfield; Macclesfield South; Macclesfield Tytherington; Macclesfield West & Ivy; Poynton East & Pott Shrigley; Poynton West & Adlington; Prestbury; Sutton.

Makerfield
Wigan: Abram; Ashton; Atherleigh (polling district LCA (part)); Bryn; Hindley; Hindley Green; Leigh West (polling district LDA); Orrell; Winstanley; Worsley Mesnes.

Manchester Central
Manchester: Ancoats & Beswick; Cheetham; Clayton & Openshaw; Deansgate; Miles Platting & Newton Heath; Piccadilly.

Oldham: Failsworth East; Failsworth West.

Manchester Rusholme
Manchester: Ardwick; Fallowfield; Hulme; Moss Side; Rusholme; Whalley Range.

Manchester Withington
Manchester: Chorlton; Chorlton Park; Didsbury East; Didsbury West; Old Moat; Withington.

Mid Cheshire
Cheshire East: Middlewich.

Cheshire West and Chester: Davenham, Moulton & Kingsmead; Hartford & Greenback; Northwich Leftwich; Northwich Winnington & Castle; Northwich Witton; Rudheath; Winsford Dene; Winsford Gravel; Winsford Over & Verdin; Winsford Swanlow; Winsford Wharton.

Morecambe and Lunesdale
Lancaster: Bare; Bolton & Slyne; Carnforth & Millhead; Halton-with-Aughton; Harbour; Heysham Central; Heysham North; Heysham South; Kellet; Lower Lune Valley; Overton; Poulton; Silverdale; Torrisholme; Upper Lune Valley; Warton; Westgate.

South Lakeland: Arnside & Milnthorpe; Burton & Crooklands; Sedbergh & Kirkby Lonsdale.

Oldham East and Saddleworth
Oldham: Alexandra; Crompton; Saddleworth North; Saddleworth South; Saddleworth West & Lees; St. James’; St. Mary’s; Shaw; Waterhead.

Oldham West, Chadderton and Royton
Oldham: Chadderton Central; Chadderton North; Chadderton South; Coldhurst; Hollinwood; Medlock Vale; Royton North; Royton South; Werneth.

Pendle and Clitheroe
Pendle: Barnoldswick; Barrowford & Pendleside; Boulsworth & Foulridge; Bradley; Earby & Coates; Fence & Higham; Marsden & Southfield; Vivary Bridge; Waterside & Horsfield; Whitefield & Walverden.

Ribble Valley: Chatburn; East Whalley, Read & Simonstone; Edisford & Low Moor; Littlemoor; Primrose; Sabden; St. Mary’s; Salthill; Whalley & Painter Wood; Wiswell & Barrow.

Penrith and Solway
Allerdale: All Saints; Allhallow & Waverton; Aspatria; Boltons; Broughton St. Bridgets; Christchurch; Crummock & Derwent Valley; Ellen & Gilcrux; Keswick; Marsh & Warmpool; Maryport North; Maryport South; Silloth & Solway Coast; Warnell; Wigton & Woodside.

Carlisle: Dalston & Burgh.

Eden: Alston Moor; Hartside; Hesket; Kirkoswald; Langwathby; Lazonby; Penrith Carleton; Penrith East; Penrith North; Penrith Pategill; Penrith South; Penrith West; Skelton.

Preston
Preston: Ashton; Brookfield; Cadley; City Centre; Deepdale; Fishwick & Frenchwood; Garrison; Ingol & Cottam; Lea & Larches; Plungington; Ribbleton; St. Matthew’s.

Ribble Valley
Preston: Greyfriars; Preston Rural East; Preston Rural North; Sharoe Green.

Ribble Valley: Alston & Hothersall; Billington & Langho; Bowland; Brockhall & Dinckley; Chipping; Clayton-le-Dale & Salesbury; Derby & Thornley; Dilworth; Gisburn & Rimington; Hurst Green & Whitewell; Mellor; Ribchester; Waddington, Bashall Eaves & Mitton; West Bradford & Grindleton; Whalley Nethertown; Wilpshire & Ramsgreave.

South Ribble: Bamber Bridge East; Bamber Bridge West; Coupe Green & Gregson Lane; Lostock Hall; Samlesbury & Walton; Walton-le-Dale East; Walton-le-Dale West.

Rochdale
Rochdale: Balderstone & Kirkholt; Central Rochdale; Healey; Kingsway; Littleborough Lakeside; Milkstone & Deeplish; Milnrow & Newhey; Smallbridge & Firgrove; Wardle & West Littleborough.

Rossendale and Darwen
Blackburn with Darwen: Blackburn South & Lower Darwen; Darwen East; Darwen South; Darwen West; West Pennine.

Rossendale: Cribden; Eden; Facit & Shawforth; Goodshaw; Greensclough; Hareholme; Healey & Whitworth; Helmshore; Irwell; Longholme; Stacksteads; Whitewell.

Runcorn and Helsby
Cheshire West and Chester: Frodsham; Gowy Rural; Helsby; Sandstone.

Halton: Beechwood & Heath; Bridgewater; Daresbury, Moore & Sandymoor; Grange; Halton Castle; Halton Lea; Mersey & Weston; Norton North; Norton South & Preston Brook.

Salford
Salford: Blackfriars & Trinity; Broughton; Claremont; Ordsall; Pendlebury & Clifton; Pendleton & Charlestown; Quays; Swinton Park; Weaste & Seedley.

Sefton Central
Sefton: Ainsdale; Blundellsands; Harington; Manor; Molyneux (polling districts C1, C2 & C3); Park; Ravenmeols; Sudell.

South Ribble
Chorley: Croston, Mawdesley & Euxton South; Eccleston, Heskin & Charnock Richard.

South Ribble: Broad Oak; Broadfield; Buckshaw & Worden; Charnock; Earnshaw Bridge; Farington East; Farington West; Hoole; Howick & Priory; Leyland Central; Longton & Hutton West; Middleforth; Moss Side; New Longton & Hutton East; St. Ambrose; Seven Stars.

Southport
Sefton: Birkdale; Cambridge; Duke’s; Kew; Meols; Norwood.

West Lancashire: Hesketh-with-Becconsall; North Meols; Rufford; Tarleton.

St Helens North
St Helens: Billinge & Seneley Green; Blackbrook; Earlestown; Haydock; Moss Bank; Newton; Parr; Rainford; Windle.

St Helens South and Whiston
Knowsley: Prescot South; Whiston & Cronton (polling district WC5).

St Helens: Bold; Eccleston; Rainhill; Sutton; Thatto Heath; Town Centre; West Park.

Stalybridge and Hyde
Tameside: Dukinfield Stalybridge; Hyde Godley; Hyde Newton; Hyde Werneth; Longdendale; Mossley; Stalybridge North; Stalybridge South.

Stockport
Stockport: Brinnington & Central; Davenport & Cale Green; Edgeley & Cheadle Heath; Heatons North; Heatons South; Reddish North; Reddish South.

Stretford and Urmston
Trafford: Bucklow-St. Martins; Clifford; Davyhulme East; Davyhulme West; Flixton; Gorse Hill; Longford; Stretford; Urmston.

Tatton
Cheshire East: Alderley Edge; Chelford; Handforth; High Legh; Knutsford; Mobberley; Wilmslow Dean Row; Wilmslow East; Wilmslow Lacey Green; Wilmslow West & Chorley.

Cheshire West and Chester: Marbury; Shakerley.

Warrington: Lymm North & Thelwall (polling districts SNA, SNB, SPA, SPB & SPC); Lymm South.

Wallasey
Wirral: Leasowe & Moreton East; Liscard; Moreton West & Saughall Massie; New Brighton; Seacombe; Upton (polling districts MA & MB); Wallasey.

Warrington North
Warrington: Birchwood; Burtonwood & Winwick; Culcheth, Glazebury & Croft; Fairfield & Howley; Orford; Poplars & Hulme; Poulton North; Poulton South; Rixton & Woolston; Westbrook.

Warrington South
Warrington Appleton; Bewsey and Whitecross; Chapelford & Old Hall; Grappenhall; Great Sankey North & Whittle Hall; Great Sankey South; Latchford East; Latchford West; Lymm North & Thelwall (polling districts SNC, SND, SNE & SNF); Penketh & Cuerdley; Stockton Heath.

West Lancashire
West Lancashire: Ashurst; Aughton & Downholland; Aughton Park; Bickerstaffe; Birch Green; Burscough East; Burscough West; Derby; Digmoor; Halsall; Knowsley; Moorside; Newburgh; Parbold; Scarisbrick; Scott; Skelmersdale North; Skelmersdale South; Tanhouse; Up Holland; Wrightington.

Westmorland and Lonsdale
Eden: Appleby (Appleby); Appleby (Bongate); Askham; Brough; Crosby Ravensworth; Dacre; Eamont; Greystroke; Kirkby Stephen; Kirkby Thore; Long Marton; Morland; Orton & Tebay; Ravenstonedale; Shap; Ullswater; Warcop.

South Lakeland: Ambleside & Grasmere; Bowness & Levens; Broughton & Coniston (polling districts AF, AO, AP, AQ, AS, AT, AU, BC, BDA, BDB, CX & DH); Cartmel; Grange; Kendal East; Kendal North; Kendal Rural; Kendal South & Natland; Kendal Town; Kendal West; Windermere.

Whitehaven and Workington
Allerdale: Dalton; Flimby; Harrington & Salterbeck; Moorclose & Moss Bay; St. John’s; St. Michael’s; Seaton & Northside; Stainburn & Clifton.

Copeland: Arlecdon & Ennerdale; Beckermet; Cleator Moor; Corkickle; Distington, Lowca & Parton; Egremont; Gosforth & Seascale; Hillcrest; Kells; Moor Row & Bigrigg; Moresby; St. Bees; Sneckyeat; Whitehaven Central; Whitehaven South.

Widnes and Halewood
Halton: Appleton; Bankfield; Birchfield; Central & West Bank; Ditton, Hale Village & Halebank; Farnworth; Halton View; Highfield; Hough Green.

Knowsley: Halewood North; Halewood South; Whiston & Cronton (polling districts WC1, WC1A, WC2, WC3 & WC4).

Wigan
Wigan: Aspull New Springs Whelley; Douglas; Ince; Pemberton; Shevington with Lower Ground; Standish with Langtree; Wigan Central; Wigan West.

Wirral West
Wirral: Clatterbridge; Greasby, Frankby & Irby; Heswall; Hoylake & Meols; Pensby & Thingwall; Upton (polling districts MC, MD & ME); West Kirby & Thurstaston.

Worsley and Eccles
Salford: Barton & Winton; Boothstown & Ellenbrook; Cadishead & Lower Irlam; Eccles; Higher Irlam & Peel Green; Swinton & Wardley; Worsley & Westwood Park.

Wigan: Astley Mosley Common.

Wythenshawe and Sale East
Manchester: Baguley; Brooklands; Northenden; Sharston; Woodhouse Park.

Trafford: Brooklands; Priory; Sale Moor.

== South East England ==
Aldershot
Hart: Blackwater & Hawley; Yateley East.

Rushmoor: Aldershot Park; Cherrywood; Cove & Southwood; Empress; Fernhill; Knellwood; Manor Park; North Town; Rowhill; St John’s; St Mark’s; Wellington; West Heath.

Arundel and South Downs
Arun: Arundel & Walberton; Barnham; Felpham East (polling district BHOE).

Chichester: Easebourne; Fernhurst; Fittleworth; Goodwood (polling districts GWBX, GWEA, GWED, GWSI & GWUP); Harting; Loxwood; Midhurst; Petworth.

Horsham: Bramber, Upper Beeding & Woodmancote; Henfield; Pulborough, Coldwaltham & Amberley; Steyning & Ashurst; Storrington & Washington; West Chiltington, Thakeham & Ashington.

Ashford
Ashford: Aylesford & East Stour; Beaver; Bircholt; Bockhanger; Bybrook; Conningbrook & Little Burton Farm; Furley; Goat Lees; Godinton; Highfield; Kennington; Mersham, Sevington South with Finberry; Norman; Park Farm North; Park Farm South; Repton; Roman; Singleton East; Singleton West; Stanhope; Victoria; Washford; Willesborough; Wye with Hinxhill.

Folkestone and Hythe: North Downs East; North Downs West.

Aylesbury
Buckinghamshire: Aston Clinton & Bierton; Aylesbury East; Aylesbury North; Aylesbury North West; Aylesbury South East; Aylesbury South West; Aylesbury West; Ivinghoe; Wing.

Banbury
Cherwell: Adderbury, Bloxham & Bodicote; Banbury, Calthorpe & Easington; Banbury Cross & Neithrop; Banbury Grimsbury & Hightown; Banbury Hardwick; Banbury Ruscote; Cropredy, Sibfords & Wroxton; Deddington.

West Oxfordshire: Chadlington & Churchill; Charlbury & Finstock; Chipping Norton; Kingham, Rollright & Enstone; The Bartons.

Basingstoke
Basingstoke and Deane: Brighton Hill; Brookvale & Kings Furlong; Chineham; Eastrop & Grove; Hatch Warren & Beggarwood; Kempshott & Buckskin; Norden; Oakley & The Candovers (polling districts OC01, OC03, OC04, OC05, OC06, OC07, OC08, OC09 & OC11); Popley; South Ham; Winklebury & Manydown.

Beaconsfield
Buckinghamshire: Beaconsfield, Cliveden, Denham (polling districts SJ, SJA, SJHD, SK, SKA & SWF); Farnham Common & Burnham Beeches; Flackwell Heath, Little Marlow & Marlow South East; Gerrards Cross (polling districts SB & SFH); Iver; Marlow; Stoke Poges & Wexham; The Wooburns, Bourne End & Hedsor.

Bexhill and Battle
Rother: Bexhill Central; Bexhill Collington; Bexhill Kewhurst; Bexhill Old Town & Worsham; Bexhill Pebsham & St. Michaels; Bexhill Sackville; Bexhill St. Marks; Bexhill St. Stephens; Bexhill Sidley; Brede & Udimore; Burwash & the Weald; Catsfield & Crowhurst; Hurst Green & Ticehurst; North Battle, Netherfield & Whatlington; Northern Rother; Robertsbridge; Sedlescombe & Westfield; South Battle & Telham.

Wealden: Herstmonceux & Pevensey Levels; Pevensey Bay.

Bicester and Woodstock
Cherwell: Bicester East; Bicester North & Caversfield; Bicester South & Ambrosden; Bicester West; Fringford & Heyfords; Kidlington East; Kidlington West; Launton & Otmoor.

West Oxfordshire: Eynsham & Cassington; Freeland & Hanborough; North Leigh; Stonesfield & Tackley; Woodstock & Bladon.

Bognor Regis and Littlehampton
Arun: Aldwick East; Aldwick West; Beach; Brookfield; Courtwick with Toddington; Felpham East (polling districts BFELE1, BFELE2, BFELE3 & BFELE4); Felpham West; Hotham; Marine; Middleton-on-Sea; Orchard; Pevensey; River; Rustington East; Rustington West; Yapton.

Bracknell
Bracknell Forest: Bullbrook; Central Sandhurst; College Town; Crown Wood; Crowthorne; Great Hollands North; Great Hollands South; Hanworth; Harmans Water; Little Sandhurst & Wellington; Old Bracknell; Owlsmoor; Priestwood & Garth; Warfield Harvest Ride; Wildridings & Central.

Brighton Kemptown and Peacehaven
Brighton and Hove: East Brighton; Hanover & Elm Grove (polling district PHEA & PHEF (part)); Moulsecoomb & Bevendean; Queen's Park; Rottingdean Coastal; Woodingdean.

Lewes: East Saltdean & Telscombe Cliffs; Peacehaven East; Peacehaven North; Peacehaven West.

Brighton Pavilion
Brighton and Hove: Hanover & Elm Grove (polling districts PHEB; PHEC; PHED and PHEE; & PHEF (part)); Hollingdean & Stanmer; Patcham; Preston Park; Regency; St Peter's & North Laine; Withdean.

Buckingham and Bletchley
Buckinghamshire: Buckingham East; Buckingham West; Great Brickhill; Winslow.

Milton Keynes: Bletchley East; Bletchley Park; Bletchley West; Tattenhoe.

Canterbury
Canterbury: Barton; Blean Forest; Chartham & Stone Street; Chestfield; Gorrell; Little Stour & Adisham; Nailbourne; Northgate; St. Stephens; Seasalter; Swalecliffe; Tankerton; Westgate; Wincheap.

Chatham and Aylesford
Medway: Chatham Central; Lordswood & Capstone; Luton & Wayfield; Princes Park; Rochester South & Horsted; Walderslade.

Tonbridge and Malling: Aylesford North & Walderslade; Burham & Wouldham; Larkfield North; Larkfield South; Snodland East & Ham Hill; Snodland West & Holborough Lakes.

Chesham and Amersham
Buckinghamshire: Amersham & Chesham Bois; Chalfont St. Giles; Chalfont St. Peter; Chesham; Chess Valley; Chiltern Ridges (polling districts CD & CDA); Denham (polling district SGE); Gerrards Cross (polling districts SGN & SGS); Hazlemere; Little Chalfont & Amersham Common; Penn Wood & Old Amersham.

Chichester
Arun: Bersted; Pagham.

Chichester: Chichester Central; Chichester East; Chichester North; Chichester South; Chichester West; Goodwood (polling districts GWWD & GWWH); Harbour Villages; Lavant; North Mundham & Tangmere; Selsey South; Sidlesham with Selsey North; Southbourne; The Witterings; Westbourne.

Crawley
Crawley: Bewbush & North Broadfield; Broadfield; Furnace Green; Gossops Green & North East Broadfield; Ifield; Langley Green & Tushmore; Maidenbower; Northgate & West Green; Pound Hill North & Forge Wood; Pound Hill South & Worth; Southgate; Three Bridges; Tilgate.

Dartford
Dartford: Bean & Village Park; Brent; Burnham; Darenth; Ebbsfleet; Greenhithe & Knockhall; Heath; Joyden’s Wood; Longfield, New Barn & Southfleet; Maypole & Leyton Cross; Newtown; Princes; Stone Castle; Stone House; Swanscombe; Temple Hill; Town; West Hill.

Didcot and Wantage
South Oxfordshire: Cholsey; Didcot North East; Didcot South; Didcot West; Sandford & the Wittenhams; Wallingford.

Vale of White Horse: Blewbury & Harwell; Drayton; Grove North; Hendreds; Ridgeway; Stanford; Steventon & the Hanneys; Sutton Courtenay; Wantage & Grove Brook; Wantage Charlton.

Dorking and Horley
Mole Valley: Beare Green; Bookham North; Bookham South; Box Hill & Headley; Brockham, Betchworth & Buckland; Capel, Leigh & Newdigate; Charlwood; Dorking North; Dorking South; Fetcham East; Fetcham West; Holmwoods; Leith Hill; Mickleham, Westhumble & Pixham; Okewood; Westcott.

Reigate and Banstead: Horley Central & South; Horley East & Salfords; Horley West & Sidlow.

Waverley: Ewhurst.

Dover and Deal
Dover: Alkham & Capel-le-Ferne; Aylesham, Eythorne & Shepherdswell; Buckland; Dover Downs & River; Eastry Rural; Guston, Kingsdown & St. Margaret’s-at-Cliffe; Maxton & Elms Vale; Middle Deal; Mill Hill; North Deal; St. Radigunds; Tower Hamlets; Town & Castle; Walmer; Whitfield.

Earley and Woodley
Reading: Church; Whitley.

Wokingham: Bulmershe & Whitegates; Coronation; Hawkedon; Hillside; Loddon; Maiden Erlegh; Shinfield North; Shinfield South; Sonning; South Lake.

East Grinstead and Uckfield
Lewes: Chailey, Barcombe & Hamsey; Newick; Wivelsfield.

Mid Sussex: Ardingly & Balcombe; Ashurst Wood; Copthorne & Worth; Crawley Down & Turners Hill; East Grinstead Ashplats; East Grinstead Baldwins; East Grinstead Herontye; East Grinstead Imberhorne; East Grinstead Town; High Weald.

Wealden: Buxted; Danehill & Fletching; Forest Row; Maresfield; Uckfield East; Uckfield New Town; Uckfield North; Uckfield Ridgewood & Little Horsted.

East Hampshire
Basingstoke and Deane: Oakley & The Candovers (polling districts OC02, OC10, OC12, OC13, OC14, OC15, OC16 & OC17).

East Hampshire: Alton Amery; Alton Ashdell; Alton Eastbrooke; Alton Holybourne; Alton Westbrooke; Alton Whitedown; Alton Wooteys; Bentworth & Froyle; Binsted, Bentley & Selborne; Buriton & East Meon; Clanfield; Four Marks & Medstead; Froxfield, Sheet & Steep; Horndean Catherington; Horndean Downs; Horndean Kings & Blendworth; Horndean Murray; Liss; Petersfield Bell Hill; Petersfield Causeway; Petersfield Heath; Petersfield St. Peter’s; Ropley, Hawkley & Hangers; Rowlands Castle.

East Surrey
Reigate and Banstead: Hooley, Merstham & Netherne.

Tandridge: Bletchingley & Nutfield; Burstow, Horne & Outwood; Chaldon; Dormansland & Felcourt; Felbridge; Godstone; Harestone; Limpsfield; Lingfield & Crowhurst; Oxted North & Tandridge; Oxted South; Portley; Queens Park; Tatsfield & Titsey; Valley; Warlingham East & Chelsham & Farleigh; Warlingham West; Westway; Whyteleafe; Woldingham.

East Thanet
Thanet: Beacon Road; Bradstowe; Central Harbour; Cliffsend & Pegwell; Cliftonville East; Cliftonville West; Dane Valley; Eastcliff; Kingsgate; Margate Central; Nethercourt; Newington; Northwood; St. Peters; Salmestone; Sir Moses Montefiore; Viking.

East Worthing and Shoreham
Adur: Buckingham; Churchill; Cokeham; Eastbrook; Hillside; Manor; Marine; Mash Barn; Peverel; St Mary's; St Nicolas; Southlands; Southwick Green; Widewater.

Worthing: Broadwater; Gaisford; Offington; Selden.

Eastbourne
Eastbourne: Devonshire; Hampden Park; Langney; Meads; Old Town; Ratton; St Anthony's; Sovereign; Upperton; Willingdon.

Eastleigh
Eastleigh: Bishopstoke; Chandler’s Ford; Eastleigh Central; Eastleigh North; Eastleigh South; Fair Oak & Horton Heath; Hiltingbury; West End North; West End South.

Test Valley: Valley Park.

Epsom and Ewell
Epsom and Ewell: Auriol; College; Court; Cuddington; Ewell; Ewell Court; Nonsuch; Ruxley; Stamford; Stoneleigh; Town; West Ewell; Woodcote.

Mole Valley: Ashtead Common; Ashtead Park; Ashtead Village; Leatherhead North; Leatherhead South.

Esher and Walton
Elmbridge: Claygate; Esher; Hersham Village; Hinchley Wood & Weston Green; Long Ditton; Molesey East; Molesey West; Oatlands & Burwood Park; Thames Ditton; Walton Central; Walton North; Walton South.

Fareham and Waterlooville
Fareham: Fareham East; Fareham North; Fareham North-West; Fareham South; Fareham West; Portchester East; Portchester West.

Havant: Cowplain; Hart Plain; Waterloo.

Winchester: Denmead; Southwick & Wickham.

Farnham and Bordon
East Hampshire: Bramshott & Liphook; Grayshott; Headley; Lindford; Whitehill Chase; Whitehill Hogmoor & Greatham; Whitehill Pinewood.

Waverley: Farnham Bourne; Farnham Castle; Farnham Firgrove; Farnham Hale & Heath End; Farnham Moor Park; Farnham Shortheath & Boundstone; Farnham Upper Hale; Farnham Weybourne & Badshot Lea; Farnham Wrecclesham & Rowledge; Frensham, Dockenfield & Tilford; Haslemere Critchmere & Shottermill; Haslemere East & Grayswood; Hindhead.

Faversham and Mid Kent
Maidstone: Bearsted; Boxley; Detling & Thurnham; Downswood & Otham; Harrietsham & Lenham; Leeds; North Downs; Park Wood; Shepway North; Shepway South.

Swale: Abbey; Boughton & Courtenay; East Downs; Priory; St. Ann’s; Teynham & Lynsted; Watling; West Downs.

Folkestone and Hythe
Folkestone and Hythe: Broadmead; Cheriton; East Folkestone; Folkestone Central; Folkestone Harbour; Hythe; Hythe Rural; New Romney; Romney Marsh; Sandgate & West Folkestone; Walland & Denge Marsh.

Gillingham and Rainham
Medway: Gillingham North; Gillingham South; Hempstead & Wigmore; Rainham Central; Rainham North; Rainham South; Twydall; Watling.

Godalming and Ash
Guildford: Ash South & Tongham; Ash Vale; Ash Wharf; Pilgrims; Shalford; Tillingbourne.

Waverley: Alfold, Cranleigh Rural & Ellens Green; Blackheath & Wonersh; Bramley, Busbridge & Hascombe; Chiddingfold & Dunsfold; Cranleigh East; Cranleigh West; Elstead & Thursley; Godalming Binscombe; Godalming Central & Ockford; Godalming Charterhouse; Godalming Farncombe & Catteshall; Godalming Holloway; Milford; Shamley Green & Cranleigh North; Witley & Hambledon.

Gosport
Fareham: Hill Head; Stubbington.

Gosport: Alverstoke; Anglesey; Bridgemary; Brockhurst & Privett; Elson; Forton; Grange & Alver Valley; Harbourside & Town; Hardway; Lee East; Lee West; Leesland & Newtown; Peel Common; Rowner & Holbrook.

Gravesham
Gravesham: Central; Chalk; Coldharbour; Higham; Istead Rise; Meopham North; Meopham South & Vigo; Northfleet North; Northfleet South; Painters Ash; Pelham; Riverside; Riverview; Shorne, Cobham & Luddesdown; Singlewell; Westcourt; Whitehill; Woodlands.

Guildford
Guildford: Burpham; Christchurch; Clandon & Horsley; Effingham; Friary & St. Nicolas; Holy Trinity; Lovelace; Merrow; Onslow; Send; Stoke; Stoughton; Westborough; Worplesdon.

Hamble Valley
Eastleigh: Botley; Bursledon & Hound North; Hamble & Netley; Hedge End North; Hedge End South.

Fareham: Locks Heath; Park Gate; Sarisbury; Titchfield; Titchfield Common; Warsash.

Winchester: Whiteley & Shedfield.

Hastings and Rye
Hastings: Ashdown; Baird; Braybrooke; Castle; Central St Leonards; Conquest; Gensing; Hollington; Maze Hill; Old Hastings; Ore; St Helens; Silverhill; Tressell; West St Leonards; Wishing Tree.

Rother: Eastern Rother; Rye & Winchelsea; Southern Rother.

Havant
Havant: Barncroft; Battins; Bedhampton; Bondfields; Emsworth; Hayling East; Hayling West; Purbrook; St. Faith’s; Stakes; Warren Park.

Henley and Thame
South Oxfordshire: Benson & Crowmarsh; Berinsfield; Chalgrove; Chinnor; Forest Hill & Holton; Garsington & Horspath; Goring; Haseley Brook; Henley-on-Thames; Kidmore End & Whitchurch; Sonning Common; Thame; Watlington; Wheatley; Woodcote & Rotherfield.

Herne Bay and Sandwich
Canterbury: Beltinge; Greenhill; Herne & Broomfield; Heron; Reculver; Sturry; West Bay.

Dover: Little Stour & Ashstone; Sandwich.

Thanet: Birchington North; Birchington South; Garlinge; Thanet Villages; Westbrook; Westgate-on-Sea.

Horsham
Horsham: Billingshurst; Broadbridge Heath; Colgate & Rusper; Cowfold, Shermanbury & West Grinstead; Denne; Forest; Holbrook East; Holbrook West; Itchingfield, Slinfold & Warnham; Nuthurst & Lower Beeding; Roffey North; Roffey South; Rudgwick; Southwater North; Southwater South & Shipley; Trafalgar.

Hove and Portslade
Brighton and Hove: Brunswick & Adelaide; Central Hove; Goldsmid; Hangleton & Knoll; Hove Park; North Portslade; South Portslade; Westbourne; Wish.

Isle of Wight East
Isle of Wight: (Note: Wards as they existed on 4 May 2021.) Bembridge; Binstead & Fishbourne; Brading & St. Helens; Haylands & Swanmore; Lake North; Lake South; Nettlestone & Seaview; Newchurch, Havenstreet & Ashey; Ryde Appley & Elmfield; Ryde Monktonmead; Ryde North West; Ryde South East; Ryde West; Sandown North; Sandown South; Shanklin Central; Shanklin South; Ventnor & St. Lawrence; Wootton Bridge; Wroxall, Lowtherville & Bonchurch.

Isle of Wight West
Isle of Wight: Brighstone, Calbourne & Shalfleet; Carisbrooke & Gunville; Central Rural; Chale, Niton & Shorwell; Cowes Medina; Cowes North; Cowes South & Northwood; Cowes West & Gurnard; East Cowes; Fairlee & Whippingham; Freshwater North & Yarmouth; Freshwater South; Mountjoy & Shide; Newport Central; Newport West; Osborne; Pan & Barton; Parkhurst & Hunnyhill; Totland & Colwell.

Lewes
Lewes: Ditchling & Westmeston; Kingston; Lewes Bridge; Lewes Castle; Lewes Priory; Newhaven North; Newhaven South; Ouse Valley & Ringmer; Plumpton, Streat, East Chiltington & St. John; Seaford Central; Seaford East; Seaford North; Seaford South; Seaford West.

Wealden: Arlington; Lower Willingdon; Polegate Central; Polegate North; Polegate South & Willingdon Watermill; South Downs; Stone Cross; Upper Willingdon.

Maidenhead
Bracknell Forest: Ascot; Binfield with Warfield; Winkfield & Cranbourne.

Windsor and Maidenhead: Belmont; Bisham & Cookham; Boyn Hill; Bray; Cox Green; Furze Platt; Hurley & Walthams; Oldfield; Pinkneys Green; Riverside; St. Mary’s.

Maidstone and Malling
Maidstone: Allington; Barming & Teston; Bridge; East; Fant; Heath; High Street; North; South.

Tonbridge and Malling: Aylesford South; Ditton; East Malling; Kings Hill; West Malling & Leybourne.

Mid Buckinghamshire
Buckinghamshire: Bernwood; Chiltern Ridges (poling districts CG, CGA, CM, CMA, CMB, CMC & CSB); Great Missenden; Grendon Underwood; Ridgeway East; Ridgeway West; Stone & Waddesdon; The Risboroughs; Wendover, Halton & Stoke Mandeville.

Mid Sussex
Mid Sussex: Bolney; Burgess Hill Dunstall; Burgess Hill Franklands; Burgess Hill Leylands; Burgess Hill Meeds; Burgess Hill St. Andrews; Burgess Hill Victoria; Cuckfield; Hassocks; Haywards Heath Ashenground; Haywards Heath Bentswood; Haywards Heath Franklands; Haywards Heath Heath; Haywards Heath Lucastes; Hurstpierpoint & Downs; Lindfield.

Milton Keynes Central
Milton Keynes: Broughton; Campbell Park & Old Woughton; Central Milton Keynes; Danesborough & Walton; Loughton & Shenley; Monkston; Shenley Brook End; Woughton & Fishermead..

Milton Keynes North
Milton Keynes: Bradwell; Newport Pagnell North & Hanslope; Newport Pagnell South; Olney; Stantonbury; Stony Stratford; Wolverton.

New Forest East
New Forest: Ashurst, Copythorne South & Netley Marsh; Boldre & Sway; Bramshaw, Copythorne North & Minstead; Brockenhurst & Forest South East; Butts Ash & Dibden Purlieu; Dibden & Hythe East; Fawley, Blackfield & Langley; Furzedown & Hardley; Holbury & North Blackfield; Hythe West & Langdown; Lyndhurst; Marchwood; Totton Central; Totton East; Totton North; Totton South; Totton West.

New Forest West
New Forest: Barton; Bashley; Becton; Bransgore & Burley; Buckland; Downlands & Forest; Fernhill; Fordingbridge; Forest North West; Hordle; Lymington Town; Milford; Milton; Pennington; Ringwood East & Sopley; Ringwood North; Ringwood South.

Newbury
West Berkshire: Chieveley & Cold Ash; Downlands (polling districts BG, CA, CB, EA, FA, FB, GA1, GA2, LB & PC); Hungerford & Kintbury; Lambourn; Newbury Central; Newbury Clay Hill; Newbury Greenham; Newbury Speen; Newbury Wash Common; Thatcham Central; Thatcham Colthrop & Crookham; Thatcham North East; Thatcham West.

North East Hampshire
Basingstoke and Deane: Basing & Upton Grey; Bramley.

Hart: Crookham East; Crookham West & Ewshot; Fleet Central; Fleet East; Fleet West; Hartley Wintney; Hook; Odiham; Yateley West.

North West Hampshire
Basingstoke and Deane: Evingar; Sherborne St. John & Rooksdown; Tadley & Pamber; Tadley North, Kingsclere & Baughurst; Whitchurch, Overton & Laverstoke.

Test Valley: Andover Downlands; Andover Harroway; Andover Millway; Andover Romans; Andover St. Mary’s; Andover Winton; Bourne Valley.

Oxford East
Oxford: Barton & Sandhills; Blackbird Leys; Churchill; Cowley; Donnington; Headington; Headington Hill & Northway; Hinksey Park; Littlemore; Lye Valley; Marston; Northfield Brook; Quarry & Risinghurst; Rose Hill & Iffley; St. Clement’s; St. Mary’s; Temple Cowley.

Oxford West and Abingdon
Oxford: Carfax & Jericho; Cutteslowe & Sunnymead; Holywell; Osney & St. Thomas; Summertown; Walton Manor; Wolvercote.

Vale of White Horse: Abingdon Abbey Northcourt; Abingdon Caldecott; Abingdon Dunmore; Abingdon Fitzharris; Abingdon Peachcroft; Botley & Sunningwell; Cumnor; Kennington & Radley; Marcham; Wootton.

Portsmouth North
Portsmouth: Baffins; Copnor; Cosham; Drayton & Farlington; Hilsea; Nelson; Paulsgrove.

Portsmouth South
Portsmouth: Central Southsea; Charles Dickens; Eastney & Craneswater; Fratton; Milton; St. Jude; St. Thomas.

Reading Central
Reading: Abbey; Battle; Caversham; Katesgrove; Mapledurham; Minster; Park; Peppard; Redlands; Southcote; Thames.

Reading West and Mid Berkshire
Reading: Kentwood; Norcot; Tilehurst.

West Berkshire: Aldermaston; Basildon; Bradfield; Bucklebury; Burghfield & Mortimer; Downlands (polling district BC); Pangbourne; Ridgeway; Theale; Tilehurst & Purley; Tilehurst Birch Copse; Tilehurst South & Holybrook.

Reigate
Reigate and Banstead: Banstead Village; Chipstead, Kingswood & Woodmansterne; Earlswood & Whitebushes; Lower Kingswood, Tadworth & Walton; Meadvale & St. John’s; Nork; Redhill East; Redhill West & Wray Common; Reigate; South Park & Woodhatch; Tattenham Corner & Preston.

Rochester and Strood
Medway: Cuxton & Halling; Peninsula; River; Rochester East; Rochester West; Strood North; Strood Rural; Strood South.

Romsey and Southampton North
Southampton: Bassett; Swaythling.

Test Valley: Ampfield & Braishfield; Anna; Bellinger; Blackwater; Charlton & the Pentons; Chilworth, Nursling & Rownhams; Harewood; Mid Test; North Baddesley; Romsey Abbey; Romsey Cupernham; Romsey Tadburn.

Runnymede and Weybridge
Elmbridge: Cobham & Downside; Oxshott & Stoke D’Abernon; Weybridge Riverside; Weybridge St. George’s Hill.

Runnymede: Addlestone North; Addlestone South; Chertsey Riverside; Chertsey St. Ann’s; Egham Hythe; Egham Town; Longcross, Lyne & Chertsey South; New Haw; Ottershaw; Thorpe; Woodham & Rowtown.

Sevenoaks
Dartford: Wilmington, Sutton-at-Hone & Hawley.

Sevenoaks: Brasted, Chevening & Sundridge; Crockenhill & Well Hill; Dunton Green & Riverhead; Eynsford; Farningham, Horton Kirby & South Darenth; Fawkham & West Kingsdown; Halstead, Knockholt & Badgers Mount; Hextable; Kemsing; Otford & Shoreham; Seal & Weald; Sevenoaks Eastern; Sevenoaks Kippington; Sevenoaks Northern; Sevenoaks Town & St. John’s; Swanley Christchurch & Swanley Village; Swanley St. Mary’s; Swanley White Oak; Westerham & Crockham Hill.

Sittingbourne and Sheppey
Swale: Bobbing, Iwade & Lower Halstow; Borden & Grove Park; Chalkwell; Hartlip, Newington & Upchurch; Homewood; Kemsley; Milton Regis; Minster Cliffs; Murston; Queenborough & Halfway; Roman; Sheerness; Sheppey Central; Sheppey East; The Meads; Woodstock.

Slough
Slough: Baylis & Stoke; Britwell & Northborough; Central; Chalvey; Cippenham Green; Cippenham Meadows; Elliman; Farnham; Haymill & Lynch Hill; Langley St. Mary’s; Upton; Wexham Lea.

Southampton Itchen
Southampton: Bargate; Bitterne; Bitterne Park; Harefield; Peartree; Sholing; Woolston.

Southampton Test
Southampton: Bevois; Coxford; Freemantle; Millbrook; Portswood; Redbridge; Shirley.

Spelthorne
Spelthorne: Ashford Common; Ashford East; Ashford North & Stanwell South; Ashford Town; Halliford & Sunbury West; Laleham & Shepperton Green; Riverside & Laleham; Shepperton Town; Staines; Staines South; Stanwell North; Sunbury Common; Sunbury East.

Surrey Heath
Guildford: Normandy; Pirbright.

Surrey Heath: Bagshot; Bisley & West End; Frimley; Frimley Green; Heatherside; Lightwater; Mytchett & Deepcut; Old Dean; Parkside; St Michaels; St Pauls; Town; Watchetts; Windlesham & Chobham.

Sussex Weald
Wealden: Chiddingly, East Hoathly & Waldron; Crowborough Central; Crowborough Jarvis Brook; Crowborough North; Crowborough St. Johns; Crowborough South East; Crowborough South West; Framfield & Cross-in-Hand; Frant & Wadhurst; Hadlow Down & Rotherfield; Hailsham Central; Hailsham East; Hailsham North; Hailsham North West; Hailsham South; Hailsham West; Hartfield; Heathfield North; Heathfield South; Hellingly; Horam & Punnetts Town; Mayfield & Five Ashes; Withyham.

Tonbridge
Sevenoaks: Ash & New Ash Green; Cowden & Hever; Edenbridge North & East; Edenbridge South & West; Hartley & Hodsoll Street; Leigh & Chiddingstone Causeway; Penshurst, Fordcombe & Chiddingstone.

Tonbridge and Malling: Borough Green & Long Mill; Cage Green; Castle; Downs & Mereworth; Hadlow & East Peckham; Higham; Hildenborough; Judd; Medway; Trench; Vauxhall; Wateringbury; Wrotham, Ightham & Stansted.

Tunbridge Wells
Tunbridge Wells: Brenchley & Horsmonden; Broadwater; Capel; Culverden; Goudhurst & Lamberhurst; Hawkhurst & Sandhurst; Paddock Wood East; Paddock Wood West; Pantiles & St. Mark’s; Park; Pembury; Rusthall; St. James’; St. John’s; Sherwood; Southborough & High Brooms; Southborough North; Speldhurst & Bidborough.

Weald of Kent
Ashford: Biddenden; Charing; Downs North; Downs West; Isle of Oxney; Kingsnorth Village & Bridgefield; Rolvenden & Tenterden West; Saxon Shore; Tenterden North; Tenterden St. Michael’s; Tenterden South; Upper Weald; Weald Central; Weald North; Weald South.

Maidstone: Boughton Monchelsea & Chart Sutton; Coxheath & Hunton; Headcorn; Loose; Marden & Yalding; Staplehurst; Sutton Valence & Langley.

Tunbridge Wells: Benenden & Cranbrook; Frittenden & Sissinghurst.

Windsor
Runnymede: Englefield Green East; Englefield Green West; Virginia Water.

Slough: Colnbrook with Poyle; Foxborough; Langley Kedermister.

Windsor and Maidenhead: Ascot & Sunninghill; Clewer & Dedworth East; Clewer & Dedworth West; Clewer East; Datchet, Horton & Wraysbury; Eton & Castle; Old Windsor; Sunningdale & Cheapside.

Winchester
Winchester: Alresford & Itchen Valley; Badger Farm & Oliver’s Battery; Bishop’s Waltham; Central Meon Valley; Colden Common & Twyford; St. Barnabas; St. Bartholomew; St. Luke; St. Michael; St. Paul; The Worthys; Upper Meon Valley; Wonston & Micheldever.

Witney
Vale of White Horse: Faringdon; Kingston Bagpuize; Thames; Watchfield & Shrivenham.

West Oxfordshire: Alvescot & Filkins; Ascott & Shipton; Bampton & Clanfield; Brize Norton & Shilton; Burford; Carterton North East; Carterton North West; Carterton South; Ducklington; Hailey, Minster Lovell & Leafield; Milton-under-Wychwood; Standlake, Aston & Stanton Harcourt; Witney Central; Witney East; Witney North; Witney South; Witney West.

Woking
Woking: Byfleet & West Byfleet; Canalside; Goldsworth Park; Heathlands; Hoe Valley; Horsell; Knaphill; Mount Hermon; Pyrford; St John’s.

Wokingham
Wokingham: Arborfield; Barkham; Charvil; Emmbrook; Evendons; Finchampstead North; Finchampstead South; Hurst; Norreys; Remenham, Wargrave and Ruscombe; Swallowfield; Twyford; Wescott; Winnersh; Wokingham Without.

Worthing West
Arun: Angmering & Findon; East Preston; Ferring.

Worthing: Castle; Central; Durrington; Goring; Heene; Marine; Northbrook; Salvington; Tarring.

Wycombe
Buckinghamshire: Abbey; Booker, Cressex & Castlefield; Chiltern Villages; Downley; Ryemead & Micklefield; Terriers & Amersham Hill; Totteridge & Bowerdean; Tylers Green & Loudwater; West Wycombe.

== South West England ==
Bath
Bath and North East Somerset: Bathavon North; Bathwick; Combe Down; Kingsmead; Lambridge; Lansdown; Moorlands; Newbridge; Odd Down; Oldfield Park; Southdown; Twerton; Walcot; Westmoreland; Weston; Widcombe & Lyncombe.

Bournemouth East
Bournemouth, Christchurch and Poole: Boscombe East & Pokesdown; Boscombe West; East Cliff & Springbourne; East Southbourne & Tuckton; Littledown & Ilford; Moordown; Muscliff & Strouden Park; Queen’s Park; West Southbourne.

Bournemouth West
Bournemouth, Christchurch and Poole: Alderney & Bourne Valley; Bournemouth Central; Kinson; Redhill & Northbourne; Talbot & Branksome Woods; Wallisdown & Winton West; Westbourne & West Cliff; Winton East.

Bridgwater
Sedgemoor: Berrow; Bridgwater Dunwear; Bridgwater Eastover; Bridgwater Fairfax; Bridgwater Hamp; Bridgwater Victoria; Bridgwater Westover; Bridgwater Wyndham; Burnham Central; Burnham North; Cannington & Wembdon; Highbridge & Burnham Marine; Huntspill & Pawlett; King’s Isle; North Petherton; Puriton & Woolavington; Quantocks.

Bristol Central
Bristol: Ashley; Central; Clifton; Clifton Down; Cotham; Hotwells & Harbourside; Redland.

Bristol East
Bristol: Brislington East; Brislington West; Easton; Knowle; Lawrence Hill; St. George Central; St. George Troopers Hill; St. George West; Stockwood.

Bristol North East
Bristol: Eastville; Frome Vale; Hillfields; Lockleaze.

South Gloucestershire: Kingswood; New Cheltenham; Staple Hill & Mangotsfield; Woodstock.

Bristol North West
Bristol: Avonmouth & Lawrence Weston; Bishopston & Ashley Down; Henbury & Brentry; Horfield; Southmead; Stoke Bishop; Westbury-on-Trym & Henleaze.

Bristol South
Bristol: Bedminster; Bishopsworth; Filwood; Hartcliffe & Withywood; Hengrove & Whitchurch Park; Southville; Windmill Hill.

Camborne and Redruth
Cornwall: Camborne Roskear & Tuckingmill; Camborne Trelowarren; Camborne West & Treswithian; Constantine, Mabe & Mawnan; Four Lanes, Beacon & Troon; Gwinear-Gwithian & Hayle East; Hayle West; Illogan & Portreath; Lanner, Stithians & Gwennap; Perranporth; Pool & Tehidy; Redruth Central, Carharrack & St Day; Redruth North; Redruth South; St Agnes.

Central Devon
Mid Devon: Boniface; Bradninch; Cadbury; Lawrence; Newbrooke; Sandford & Creedy; Silverton; Taw; Taw Vale; Upper Yeo; Way; Yeo.

Teignbridge: Ashburton & Buckfastleigh; Bovey; Chudleigh; Haytor; Kenn Valley; Moretonhampstead; Teign Valley.

West Devon: Chagford; Drewsteignton; Exbourne; Hatherleigh; Okehampton North; Okehampton South; South Tawton.

Cheltenham
Cheltenham: All Saints; Battledown; Benhall & the Reddings; Charlton Kings; Charlton Park; College; Hesters Way; Lansdown; Leckhampton; Oakley; Park; Pittville; St. Mark’s; St. Paul’s; St. Peter’s; Up Hatherley; Warden Hill.

Chippenham
Wiltshire: Calne Central; Calne Chilvester & Abberd; Calne North; Calne Rural; Chippenham Cepen Park & Derriads; Chippenham Cepen Park & Hunters Moon; Chippenham Hardenhuish; Chippenham Hardens & Central; Chippenham Lowden & Rowden; Chippenham Monkton; Chippenham Pewsham; Chippenham Sheldon; Corsham Ladbrook; Corsham Pickwick; Corsham Without; Lyneham; Royal Wootton Bassett East; Royal Wootton Bassett North; Royal Wootton Bassett South & West.

Christchurch
Bournemouth, Christchurch and Poole: Burton & Grange; Christchurch Town; Commons; Highcliffe & Walkford; Mudeford, Stanpit & West Highcliffe.

Dorset: Ferndown North; Ferndown South; St. Leonards & St. Ives; West Moors & Three Legged Cross; West Parley.

East Wiltshire
Swindon: Chiseldon & Lawn (polling district CLB); Ridgeway; Wroughton and Wichelstowe.

Wiltshire: Aldbourne & Ramsbury; Amesbury East & Bulford; Amesbury South; Amesbury West; Avon Valley; Durrington; Ludgershall North & Rural; Marlborough East; Marlborough West; Pewsey; Pewsey Vale East; Pewsey Vale West; Tidworth East & Ludgershall South; Tidworth North & West; Till Valley.

Exeter
Exeter: Alphington; Duryard & St. James; Exwick; Heavitree; Mincinglake & Whipton; Newtown & St. Leonard’s; Pennsylvania; Priory; St. David’s; St. Thomas.

Exmouth and Exeter East
East Devon: Broadclyst; Budleigh & Raleigh; Clyst Valley; Cranbrook; Exe Valley; Exmouth Brixington; Exmouth Halsdon; Exmouth Littleham; Exmouth Town; Exmouth Withycombe Raleigh; Whimple & Rockbeare; Woodbury & Lympstone.

Exeter: Pinhoe; St. Loyes; Topsham.

Filton and Bradley Stoke
South Gloucestershire: Bradley Stoke North; Bradley Stoke South; Charlton & Cribbs; Emersons Green; Filton; Frenchay & Downend; Patchway Coniston; Stoke Gifford; Stoke Park & Cheswick; Winterbourne.

Frome and East Somerset
Bath and North East Somerset: Bathavon South; Midsomer Norton North; Midsomer Norton Redfield; Peasedown; Radstock; Westfield.

Mendip: Ammerdown; Ashwick, Chilcompton & Stratton; Beckington & Selwood; Coleford & Holcombe; Cranmore, Doulting & Nunney; Creech; Frome Berkley Down; Frome College; Frome Keyford; Frome Market; Frome Oakfield; Frome Park; Postlebury; Rode & Norton St. Philip; The Pennards & Ditcheat.

Forest of Dean
Forest of Dean: Berry Hill; Bream; Cinderford East; Cinderford West; Coleford; Dymock; Hartpury & Redmarley; Longhope & Huntley; Lydbrook; Lydney East; Lydney North; Lydney West & Aylburton; Mitcheldean, Ruardean & Drybrook; Newent & Taynton; Newland & Sling; Newnham; Pillowell; Ruspidge; St. Briavels; Tidenham; Westbury-on-Severn.

Glastonbury and Somerton
Mendip: Butleigh & Baltonsborough; Glastonbury St. Benedict’s; Glastonbury St. Edmund’s; Glastonbury St. John’s; Glastonbury St. Mary’s; Street North; Street South; Street West.

South Somerset: Blackmoor Vale; Bruton; Burrow Hill; Camelot; Cary; Curry Rivel, Huish & Langport; Hamdon; Islemoor; Martock; Milborne Port; Northstone, Ivelchester & St. Michael’s; Tower; Turn Hill; Wessex; Wincanton.

Gloucester
Gloucester: Abbeydale; Abbeymead; Barnwood; Barton & Tredworth; Coney Hill; Grange; Hucclecote; Kingholm & Wotton; Kingsway; Matson & Robinswood; Moreland; Podsmead; Quedgeley Fieldcourt; Quedgeley Severn Vale; Tuffley; Westgate.

Honiton and Sidmouth
East Devon: Axminster; Beer & Branscombe; Coly Valley; Dunkeswell & Otterhead; Feniton; Honiton St. Michael’s; Honiton St. Paul’s; Newbridges; Newton Poppleford & Harpford; Ottery St. Mary; Seaton; Sidmouth Rural; Sidmouth Sidford; Sidmouth Town; Tale Vale; Trinity; West Hill & Aylesbeare; Yarty.

Mid Devon: Cullompton North; Cullompton Outer; Cullompton South.

Melksham and Devizes
Wiltshire: Bowerhill; Box & Colerne; Bradford-on-Avon North; Bradford-on-Avon South; Bromham, Rowde & Roundway; Calne South; Devizes East; Devizes North; Devizes Rural West; Devizes South; Holt; Melksham East; Melksham Forest; Melksham South; Melksham Without North & Shurnhold; Melksham Without West & Rural; The Lavingtons; Urchfont & Bishops Cannings; Winsley & Westwood.

Mid Dorset and North Poole
Bournemouth, Christchurch and Poole: Bearwood & Merley; Broadstone; Canford Heath.

Dorset: Colehill & Wimborne Minster East; Corfe Mullen; Lytchett Matravers & Upton; Stour & Allen Vale; Wareham; West Purbeck (polling districts WPU2 & WPU3); Wimborne Minster.

Newton Abbot
Teignbridge: Ambrook; Bishopsteignton; Bradley; Buckland & Milber; Bushell; College; Dawlish North East; Dawlish South West; Ipplepen; Kenton & Starcross; Kerswell-with-Combe; Kingsteignton East; Kingsteignton West; Shaldon & Stokeinteignhead; Teignmouth Central; Teignmouth East; Teignmouth West.

North Cornwall
Cornwall: Altarnun & Stoke Climsland; Bodmin St Mary’s & St. Leonard; Bodmin St Petroc’s; Bude; Camelford & Boscastle; Lanivet, Blisland & Bodmin St Lawrence; Launceston North & North Petherwin; Launceston South; Padstow; Poundstock; St Columb Major, St Mawgan & St Wenn; St Teath & Tintagel; Stratton, Kilkhampton & Morwenstow; Wadebridge East & St Minver; Wadebridge West & St Mabyn.

North Cotswolds
Cotswold: Blockley; Bourton Vale; Bourton Village; Campden & Vale; Chedworth & Churn Valley; Coln Valley; Ermin; Fosseridge; Moreton East; Moreton West; Northleach; Sandywell; Stow; The Rissingtons.

Stroud: Bisley; Hardwicke; Minchinhampton; Painswick & Upton.

Tewkesbury: Badgeworth; Brockworth East; Brockworth West; Churchdown Brookfield with Hucclecote; Churchdown St. John’s; Shurdington.

North Devon
North Devon: Barnstaple Central; Barnstaple with Pilton; Barnstaple with Westacott; Bickington; Bishop's Nympton; Bratton Fleming; Braunton East; Braunton West & Georgeham; Chittlehampton; Chulmleigh; Combe Martin; Fremington; Heanton Punchardon; Ilfracombe East; Ilfracombe West; Instow; Landkey; Lynton & Lynmouth; Marwood; Mortehoe; Newport; North Molton; Roundswell; South Molton; Witheridge.

North Dorset
Dorset: Beacon; Blackmore Vale; Blandford; Cranborne & Alderholt; Cranborne Chase; Gillingham; Hill Forts & Upper Tarrants; Puddletown & Lower Winterborne; Shaftesbury Town; Stalbridge & Marnhull; Sturminster Newton; Verwood; Winterborne North.

North East Somerset and Hanham
Bath and North East Somerset: Chew Valley; Clutton & Farmborough; High Littleton; Keynsham East; Keynsham North; Keynsham South; Mendip; Paulton; Publow & Whitchurch; Saltford; Timsbury.

South Gloucestershire: Bitton & Oldland Common; Hanham; Longwell Green; Parkwall & Warmley.

North Somerset
North Somerset: Backwell; Clevedon East; Clevedon South; Clevedon Walton; Clevedon West; Clevedon Yeo; Gordano Valley; Long Ashton; Nailsea Golden Valley; Nailsea West End; Nailsea Yeo; Nailsea Youngwood; Pill; Portishead East; Portishead North; Portishead South; Portishead West; Winford; Wrington.

Poole
Bournemouth, Christchurch and Poole: Canford Cliffs; Creekmoor; Hamworthy; Newtown & Heatherlands; Oakdale; Parkstone; Penn Hill; Poole Town.

Plymouth Moor View
Plymouth: Budshead; Eggbuckland; Ham; Honicknowle; Moor View; Peverall (polling districts KC & KD); Southway; St. Budeaux.

Plymouth Sutton and Devonport
Plymouth: Compton; Devonport; Drake; Efford & Lipson, Peverell (polling districts KA, KB & KE); St. Peter & the Waterfront; Stoke; Sutton & Mount Gould.

Salisbury
Wiltshire: Alderbury & Whiteparish; Downton & Ebble Valley; Fovant & Chalke Valley; Laverstock; Nadder Valley; Old Sarum & Lower Bourne Valley; Redlynch & Landford; Salisbury Bemerton Heath; Salisbury Fisherton & Bemerton Village; Salisbury Harnham East; Salisbury Harnham West; Salisbury Milford; Salisbury St Edmund’s; Salisbury St Francis & Stratford; Salisbury St Paul’s; Tisbury; Wilton; Winterslow & Upper Bourne Valley.

South Cotswolds
Cotswold: Abbey; Chesteron; Fairford North; Four Acres; Grumbolds Ash with Avening; Kemble; Lechlade, Kempsford & Fairford South; New Mills; St. Michael’s; Siddington & Cerney Rural; South Cerney Village; Stratton; Tetbury East & Rural; Tetbury Town; Tetbury with Upton; The Ampneys & Hampton; The Beeches; Watermoor.

Stroud: Kingswood.

Wiltshire: Brinkworth; By Brook; Cricklade & Latton; Kington; Malmesbury; Minety; Purton; Sherston.

South East Cornwall
Cornwall: Callington & St Dominic; Calstock; Liskeard Central; Liskeard South & Dobwalls; Looe East & Deviock; Looe West, Pelynt, Lansallos & Lanteglos; Lostwithiel & Lanreath; Lynher; Rame Peninsula & St Germans; St Cleer & Menheniot; Saltash Essa; Saltash Tamar; Saltash Trematon & Landrake; Torpoint.

South Devon
South Hams: Allington & Strete; Blackawton & Stoke Fleming; Charterlands; Dartington & Staverton; Dartmouth & East Dart; Kingsbridge; Loddiswell & Aveton Gifford; Marldon & Littlehempston; Salcombe & Thurlestone; South Brent; Stokenham; Totnes; West Dart.

Torbay: Churston with Galmpton; Collaton St. Mary; Furzeham with Summercombe; King’s Ash; St. Peter’s with St. Mary’s.

South Dorset
Dorset: Chickerell; Crossways; Littlemoor & Preston; Melcombe Regis; Portland; Radipole; Rodwell & Wyke; South East Purbeck; Swanage; Upwey & Broadwey; West Purbeck (polling districts WPU1, WPU4, WPU5, WPU6, WPU7, WPU8, WPU9, WPU10, WPU11, WPU12 & WPU13); Westham.

South West Devon
Plymouth: Plympton Chaddlewood; Plympton Erle; Plympton St. Mary; Plymstock Dunstone; Plymstock Radford.

South Hams: Bickleigh & Cornwood; Ermington & Ugborough; Ivybridge East; Ivybridge West; Newton & Yealmpton; Wembury & Brixton; Woolwell.

West Devon: Buckland Monachorum; Burrator.

South West Wiltshire
Wiltshire: Ethandune; Hilperton; Mere; Southwick; Trowbridge Adcroft; Trowbridge Central; Trowbridge Drynham; Trowbridge Grove; Trowbridge Lambrok; Trowbridge Park; Trowbridge Paxcroft; Warminster Broadway; Warminster East; Warminster North & Rural; Warminster West; Westbury East; Westbury North; Westbury West; Wylye Valley.

St Austell and Newquay
Cornwall: Fowey, Tywardreath & Par; Mevagissey & St Austell Bay; Newquay Central & Pentire; Newquay Porth & Tretherras; Newquay Trenance; Penwithick & Boscoppa; Roche & Bugle; St Austell Bethel & Holmbush; St Austell Central & Gover; St Austell Poltair & Mount Charles; St Blazey; St Columb Minor & Colan; St Dennis & St Enoder; St Mewan & Grampound; St Stephen-in-Brannel.

St Ives
Cornwall: Crowan, Sithney & Wendron; Helston North; Helston South & Meneage; Land’s End; Long Rock, Marazion & St Erth; Ludgvan, Madron, Gulval & Heamoor; Mousehole, Newlyn & St Buryan; Mullion & St Keverne; Penzance East; Penzance Promenade; Porthleven, Breage & Germoe; St Ives East, Lelant & Carbis Bay; St Ives West & Towednack.

Isles of Scilly: Bryher; St Agnes; St Martin's; St Mary's; Tresco.

Stroud
Stroud: Amberley & Woodchester; Berkeley Vale; Cainscross; Cam East; Cam West; Chalford; Coaley & Uley; Dursley; Nailsworth; Randwick, Whiteshill & Ruscombe; Rodborough; Severn; Stonehouse; Stroud Central; Stroud Farmhill & Paganhill; Stroud Slade; Stroud Trinity; Stroud Uplands; Stroud Valley; The Stanleys; Thrupp; Wotton-under-Edge.

Swindon North
Swindon: Blunsdon & Highworth; Gorse Hill & Pinehurst; Haydon Wick; Penhill & Upper Stratton; Priory Vale; Rodbourne Cheney; St. Andrews; St. Margaret & South Marston.

Swindon South
Swindon: Central; Chiseldon & Lawn (polling districts CLA, CLC & CLD); Covingham & Dorcan; Eastcott; Liden, Eldene & Park South; Lydiard & Freshbrook; Mannington & Western; Old Town; Shaw; Walcot & Park North.

Taunton and Wellington
Somerset West and Taunton: Blackbrook & Holway; Comeytrowe & Bishop’s Hull; Creech St. Michael; Halcon & Lane; Hatch & Blackdown; Manor & Tangier; Monument; North Curry & Ruishton; North Town; Norton Fitzwarren & Staplegrove; Priorswood; Rockwell Green; Trull, Pitminster & Corfe; Victoria; Vivary; Wellington East; Wellington North; Wellington South; Wellsprings & Rowbarton; West Monkton & Cheddon Fitzpaine; Wilton & Sherford.

Tewkesbury
Cheltenham: Prestbury; Springbank; Swindon Village.

Gloucester: Elmbridge; Longlevens.

Tewkesbury: Cleeve Grange; Cleeve Hill; Cleeve St. Michael’s; Cleeve West; Innsworth; Isbourne; Northway; Severn Vale North; Severn Vale South; Tewkesbury East; Tewkesbury North & Twyning; Tewkesbury South; Winchcombe.

Thornbury and Yate
South Gloucestershire: Boyd Valley; Charfield; Chipping Sodbury & Cotswold Edge; Dodington; Frampton Cotterell; Pilning & Severn Beach; Severn Vale; Thornbury; Yate Central; Yate North.

Tiverton and Minehead
Mid Devon: Canonsleigh; Castle; Clare & Shuttern; Cranmore; Halberton; Lower Culm; Lowman; Upper Culm; Westexe.

Somerset West and Taunton: Alcombe; Cotford St. Luke & Oake; Dulverton & District; Exmoor; Milverton & District; Minehead Central; Minehead North; Old Cleeve & District; Periton & Woodcombe; Porlock & District; Quantock Vale; South Quantock; Watchet & Williton; Wiveliscombe & District.

Torbay
Torbay: Barton with Watcombe; Clifton with Maidenway; Cockington with Chelston; Ellacombe; Goodrington with Roselands; Preston; Roundham with Hyde; St. Marychurch; Shiphay; Tormohun; Wellswood.

Torridge and Tavistock
Torridge: Appledore; Bideford East; Bideford North; Bideford South; Bideford West; Broadheath; Great Torrington; Hartland; Holsworthy; Milton & Tamarside; Monkleigh & Putford; Northam; Shebbear & Langtree; Two Rivers & Three Moors; Westward Ho!; Winkleigh.

West Devon: Bere Ferrers; Bridestowe; Dartmoor; Mary Tavy; Milton Ford; Tamarside; Tavistock North; Tavistock South East; Tavistock South West.

Truro and Falmouth
Cornwall: Falmouth Arwenack; Falmouth Boslowick; Falmouth Penwerris; Falmouth Trescobeas & Budock; Feock & Kea; Gloweth, Malabar & Shortlanesend; Mylor, Perranarworthal & Ponsanooth; Penryn; Probus & St Erme; St Goran, Tregony & the Roseland; St Newlyn East, Cubert & Goonhavern; Threemilestone & Chacewater; Truro Boscawen & Redannick; Truro Moresk & Trehaverne; Truro Tregolls.

Wells and Mendip Hills
Mendip: Chewton Mendip & Ston Easton; Croscombe & Pilton; Moor; Rodney & Westbury; St. Cuthbert Out North; Shepton East; Shepton West; Wells Central; Wells St. Cuthbert’s; Wells St. Thomas’; Wookey & St. Cuthbert Out West.

North Somerset: Banwell & Winscombe; Blagdon & Churchill; Congresbury & Puxton; Yatton.

Sedgemoor: Axevale; Cheddar & Shipham; East Polden; Knoll; Wedmore & Mark; West Polden.

West Dorset
Dorset: Beaminster; Bridport; Chalk Valleys; Charminster St. Mary’s; Chesil Bank; Dorchester East; Dorchester Poundbury; Dorchester West; Eggardon; Lyme & Charmouth; Marshwood Vale; Sherborne East; Sherborne Rural; Sherborne West; Winterborne & Broadmayne; Yetminster.

Weston-Super-Mare
North Somerset: Hutton & Locking; Weston-super-Mare Central; Weston-super-Mare Hillside; Weston-super-Mare Kewstoke; Weston-super-Mare Mid Worle; Weston-super-Mare Milton; Weston-super-Mare North Worle; Weston-super-Mare South; Weston-super-Mare South Worle; Weston-super-Mare Uphill; Weston-super-Mare Winterstoke; Wick St. Lawrence & St. Georges.

Yeovil
South Somerset: Blackdown & Tatworth; Brympton; Chard Avishayes; Chard Combe; Chard Crimchard; Chard Holyrood; Chard Jocelyn; Coker; Crewkerne; Eggwood; Ilminster; Neroche; Parrett; South Petherton; Windwhistle; Yeovil College; Yeovil Lyde; Yeovil Summerlands; Yeovil Westland; Yeovil Without.

== West Midlands ==
Aldridge-Brownhills
Walsall: Aldridge Central & South; Aldridge North & Walsall Wood; Brownhills; Paddock (polling districts UE & UF); Pelsall; Pheasey Park Farm; Rushall-Shelfield; Streetly.

Birmingham Edgbaston
Birmingham: Bartley Green; Edgbaston; Harborne; North Edgbaston; Quinton.

Birmingham Erdington
Bimringham: Castle Vale; Erdington; Gravelly Hill; Kingstanding; Oscott (polling districts OSC4, OSC5, OSC7 & OSC8); Perry Common; Pype Hayes; Stockland Green.

Birmingham Hall Green and Moseley
Birmingham: Brandwood & King’s Heath (polling districts BKH1HG, BKH2HG & BKH3); Hall Green North; Hall Green South; Moseley; Sparkbrook & Balsall Heath East; Sparkhill.

Birmingham Hodge Hill and Solihull North
Birmingham: Bromford & Hodge Hill; Garretts Green; Glebe Farm & Tile Cross; Heartlands; Shard End; Ward End.

Solihull: Castle Bromwich; Smith’s Wood.

Birmingham Ladywood
Birmingham: Alum Rock; Balsall Heath West; Bordesley & Highgate; Bordesley Green; Ladywood; Nechells; Newtown; Soho & Jewellery Quarter.

Birmingham Northfield
Birmingham: Allens Cross; Frankley Great Park; King’s Norton North; King’s Norton South; Longbridge & West Heath; Northfield; Rubery & Rednal; Weoley & Selly Oak (polling districts WSO1ED, WSO4, WSO6, WSO7, WSO8, WSO9 & WSO10).

Birmingham Perry Barr
Birmingham: Aston; Birchfield; Handsworth; Handsworth Wood; Holyhead; Lozells; Oscott (polling districts OSC1, OSC2, OSC3 & OSC6); Perry Barr.

Birmingham Selly Oak
Birmingham: Billesley; Bournbrook & Selly Park; Bournville & Cotteridge; Brandwood & King’s Heath (polling districts BKH4, BKH5 & BKH6); Druids Heath & Monyhull; Highter’s Heath; Stirchley; Weoley & Selly Oak (polling districts WSO2SO, WSO3SO & WSO5SO).

Birmingham Yardley
Birmingham: Acocks Green; Sheldon; Small Heath; South Yardley; Tyseley & Hay Mills; Yardley East; Yardley West & Stechford.

Bromsgrove
Bromsgrove: Alvechurch South; Alvechurch Village; Aston Fields; Avoncroft; Barnt Green & Hopwood; Belbroughton & Romsley; Bromsgrove Central; Catshill North; Catshill South; Charford; Cofton; Drakes Cross; Hagley East; Hagley West; Hill Top; Hollywood; Lickey Hills; Lowes Hill; Marlbrook; Norton; Perryfields; Rock Hill; Rubery North; Rubery South; Sanders Park; Sidemoor; Slideslow; Tardebigge; Wythall East; Wythall West.

Burton and Uttoxeter
East Staffordshire: Abbey; Anglesey; Branston; Brizlincote; Burton; Churnet; Crown; Eton Park; Heath; Horninglow; Rolleston on Dove; Shobnall; Stapenhill; Stretton; Town; Tutbury & Outwoods; Weaver; Winshill.

Cannock Chase
Brereton & Ravenhill; Cannock East; Cannock North; Cannock South; Cannock West; Etching Hill & The Heath; Hagley; Hawks Green; Heath Hayes East & Wimblebury; Hednesford Green Heath; Hednesford North; Hednesford South; Norton Canes; Rawnsley; Western Springs.

Coventry East
Coventry: Binley & Willenhall; Foleshill; Henley; Longford; Upper Stoke; Wyken.

Coventry North West
Coventry: Bablake; Holbrook; Radford; Sherbourne; Whoberley; Woodlands.

Coventry South
Coventry: Cheylesmore; Earlsdon; Lower Stoke; St. Michael’s; Wainbody; Westwood.

Droitwich and Evesham
Wychavon: Badsey; Bengeworth; Bowbrook; Bretforton & Offenham; Broadway & Wickhamford; Drakes Broughton; Droitwich Central; Droitwich East; Droitwich South East; Droitwich South West; Droitwich West; Evesham North; Evesham South; Fladbury; Great Hampton; Hartlebury; Honeybourne & Pebworth; Little Hampton; Lovett & North Claines; Norton & Whittington; Ombersley; Pinvin; The Littletons; Upton Snodsbury.

Dudley
Dudley: Brockmoor & Pensnett; Castle & Priory; Gornal; St. James’s; St. Thomas’s; Sedgley; Upper Gornal & Woodsetton.

Halesowen
Dudley: Belle Vale; Cradley & Wollescote; Halesowen North; Halesowen South; Hayley Green & Cradley South; Quarry Bank & Dudley Wood.

Sandwell: Blackheath (polling district BLG); Cradley Heath & Old Hill.

Hereford and South Herefordshire
Herefordshire: Aylestone Hill; Belmont Rural; Birch; Bobblestock; Central; College; Dinedor Hill; Eign Hill; Golden Valley North; Golden Valley South; Greyfriars; Hinton & Hunderton; Kerne Bridge; Kings Acre; Llangarron; Newton Farm; Penyard; Red Hill; Ross East; Ross North; Ross West; Saxon Gate; Stoney Street; Tupsley; Whitecross; Widemarsh; Wormside.

Kenilworth and Southam
Rugby: Dunsmore; Leam Valley.

Stratford-on-Avon: Bishop’s Itchington; Harbury; Kineton; Long Itchington & Stockton; Napton & Fenny Compton; Red Horse; Southam North; Southam South; Wellesbourne East; Wellesbourne West.

Warwick: Budbrooke; Cubbington & Leek Wootton; Kenilworth Abbey & Arden; Kenilworth Park Hill; Kenilworth St. John’s.

Kingswinford and South Staffordshire
Dudley: Kingswinford North & Wall Heath; Kingswinford South; Wordsley.

South Staffordshire: Bilbrook; Codsall North; Codsall South; Himley & Swindon; Kinver; Pattingham & Patshull; Perton Dippons; Perton East; Perton Lakeside; Trysull & Seisdon; Wombourne North & Lower Penn; Wombourne South East; Wombourne South West.

Lichfield
East Staffordshire: Bagots; Needwood; Yoxall.

Lichfield: Alrewas & Fradley; Armitage with Handsacre; Boley Park; Boney Hay & Central; Chadsmead; Chase Terrace; Chasetown; Colton & the Ridwares; Curborough; Hammerwich with Wall; Highfield; Leomansley; Longdon; St. John’s; Stowe; Summerfield & All Saints; Whittington & Streethay (polling district AD).

Meriden and Solihull East
Solihull: Bickenhill; Chelmsley Wood; Dorridge & Hockley Heath; Elmdon; Kingshurst & Fordbridge; Knowle; Meriden; Silhill.

Newcastle-under-Lyme
Newcastle-under-Lyme: Audley; Bradwell; Clayton; Crackley & Red Street; Cross Heath; Holditch & Chesterton; Keele; Knutton; Madeley & Betley; May Bank; Silverdale; Thistleberry; Town; Westbury Park & Northwood; Westlands; Wolstanton.

North Herefordshire
Herefordshire: Arrow; Backbury; Bircher; Bishops Frome & Cradley; Bromyard Bringsty; Bromyard West; Castle; Credenhill; Hagley; Hampton; Holmer; Hope End; Kington; Ledbury North; Ledbury South; Ledbury West; Leominster East; Leominster North & Rural; Leominster South; Leominster West; Mortimer; Old Gore; Queenswood; Sutton Walls; Three Crosses; Weobley.

North Shropshire
Shropshire: Ellesmere Urban; Gobowen, Selattyn & Weston Rhyn; Llanymynech; Market Drayton East; Market Drayton West; Oswestry East; Oswestry South; Oswestry West; Prees; Ruyton and Baschurch; St. Martin’s; St. Oswald; Shawbury; The Meres; Wem; Whitchurch North; Whitchurch South; Whittington.

North Warwickshire and Bedworth
North Warwickshire: Atherstone Central; Atherstone North; Atherstone South & Mancetter; Baddesley & Grendon; Coleshill North; Coleshill South; Curdworth; Dordon; Fillongley; Hurley & Wood End; Kingsbury; Newton Regis & Warton; Polesworth East; Polesworth West; Water Orton.

Nuneaton and Bedworth: Bede; Exhall; Heath; Poplar; Slough.

Nuneaton
North Warwickshire: Arley & Whitacre; Hartshill.

Nuneaton and Bedworth: Abbey; Arbury; Attleborough; Bar Pool; Camp Hill; Galley Common; Kingswood; St. Nicolas; Weddington; Wem Brook; Whitestone.

Redditch
Redditch: Abbey; Astwood Bank & Feckenham; Batchley & Brockhill; Central; Church Hill; Crabbs Cross; Greenlands; Headless Cross & Oakenshaw; Lodge Park; Matchborough; West; Winyates.

Wychavon: Dodderhill; Harvington & Norton; Inkberrow.

Rugby
Nuneaton and Bedworth: Bulkington.

Rugby: Admirals & Cawston; Benn; Bilton; Clifton, Newton & Churchover; Coton & Boughton; Eastlands; Hillmorton; New Bilton; Newbold & Brownsover; Paddox; Revel & Binley Woods; Rokeby & Overslade; Wolston & the Lawfords; Wolvey & Shilton.

Shrewsbury
Shropshire: Abbey; Bagley; Battlefield; Bayston Hill, Column & Sutton; Belle Vue; Bowbrook; Castlefields & Ditherington; Copthorne; Harlescott; Longden; Loton; Meole; Monkmoor; Porthill; Quarry & Coton Hill; Radbrook; Rea Valley; Sundorne; Tern; Underdale.

Smethwick
Sandwell: Abbey; Blackheath (polling districts BLA, BLB, BLC, BLD, BLE, BLF & BLH); Bristnall; Langley; Old Warley; St. Pauls; Smethwick; Soho & Victoria.

Solihull West and Shirley
Solihull: Blythe; Lyndon; Olton; St. Alphege; Shirley East; Shirley South; Shirley West.

South Shropshire
Shropshire: Alveley & Claverley; Bishop’s Castle; Bridgnorth East & Astley Abbotts; Bridgnorth West & Tasley; Broseley; Brown Clee; Burnell; Chirbury & Worthen; Church Stretton & Craven Arms; Clee; Cleobury Mortimer; Clun; Corvedale; Highley; Ludlow East;Ludlow North; Ludlow South; Much Wenlock; Severn Valley; Worfield.

Stafford
Newcastle-under-Lyme: Loggerheads; Maer & Whitmore.

Stafford: Baswich; Common; Coton; Doxey & Castletown; Eccleshall; Forebridge; Gnosall & Woodseaves; Highfields & Western Downs; Holmcroft; Littleworth; Manor; Penkside; Rowley; Seighford & Church Eaton; Weeping Cross & Wildwood.

Staffordshire Moorlands
Staffordshire Moorlands: Alton; Bagnall & Stanley; Biddulph East; Biddulph Moor; Biddulph North; Biddulph South; Biddulph West; Brown Edge & Endon; Caverswall; Cellarhead; Cheadle North East; Cheadle South East; Cheadle West; Cheddleton; Churnet; Dane; Hamps Valley; Horton; Ipstones; Leek East; Leek North; Leek South; Leek West; Manifold; Werrington.

Stoke-on-Trent Central
Stoke-on-Trent: Abbey Hulton & Townsend; Bentilee & Ubberley; Birches Head & Central Forest Park; Boothen & Oak Hill; Eaton Park; Etruria & Hanley; Fenton East; Fenton West & Mount Pleasant; Hanley Park & Shelton; Hartshill & Basford; Joiner’s Square; Meir Hay; Penkhull & Stoke; Sandford Hill; Sneyd Green; Springfields & Trent Vale.

Stoke-on-Trent North
Newcastle-under-Lyme: Kidsgrove & Ravenscliffe; Newchapel & Mow Cop; Talke & Butt Lane.

Stoke-on-Trent: Baddeley, Milton & Norton; Bradeley & Chell Heath; Burslem Central; Burslem Park; Ford Green & Smallthorne; Goldenhill & Sandyford; Great Chell & Packmoor; Little Chell & Stanfield; Moorcroft; Tunstall.

Stoke-on-Trent South
Stafford: Barlaston; Fulford; Swynnerton & Oulton.

Staffordshire Moorlands: Checkley; Forsbrook.

Stoke-on-Trent: Blurton East; Blurton West & Newstead; Broadway & Longton East; Dresden & Florence; Hanford & Trentham; Hollybush & Longton West; Lightwood North & Normacot; Meir North; Meir Park; Meir South; Weston Coyney.

Stone, Great Wyrley and Penkridge
South Staffordshire: Brewood & Coven; Cheslyn Hay North & Saredon; Cheslyn Hay South; Essington; Featherstone & Shareshill; Great Wyrley Landywood; Great Wyrley Town; Huntington & Hatherton; Penkridge North East & Acton Trussell; Penkridge South East; Penkridge West; Wheaton Aston, Bishopswood & Lapley.

Stafford: Haywood & Hixon; Milford; Milwich; St. Michael’s & Stonefield; Walton.

Stourbridge
Dudley: Amblecote; Brierley Hill; Lye & Stourbridge North; Netherton, Woodside & St. Andrews; Norton; Pedmore & Stourbridge East; Wollaston & Stourbridge Town.

Stratford-on-Avon
Stratford-on-Avon: Alcester & Rural; Alcester Town; Avenue; Bidford East; Bidford West & Salford; Bishopton; Brailes & Compton; Bridgetown; Clopton; Ettington; Guildhall; Hathaway; Henley-in-Arden; Kinwarton; Quinton; Shipston North; Shipston South; Shottery; Snitterfield; Studley with Mappleborough Green; Studley with Sambourne; Tanworth-in-Arden; Tiddington; Welcombe; Welford-on-Avon; Wotton Wawen.

Sutton Coldfield
Birmingham: Sutton Four Oaks; Sutton Mere Green; Sutton Reddicap; Sutton Roughley; Sutton Trinity; Sutton Vesey; Sutton Walmley & Minworth; Sutton Wylde Green.

Tamworth
Lichfield: Bourne Vale; Fazeley; Little Aston & Stonnall; Mease Valley; Shenstone; Whittington & Streethay (polling districts JA, YA, YB, YC, ZA & ZB).

Tamworth: Amington; Belgrave; Bolehall; Castle; Glascote; Mercian; Spital; Stonydelph; Trinity; Wilnecote.

Telford
Telford and Wrekin: Brookside; Dawley & Aqueduct; Horsehay & Lightmoor; Ironbridge Gorge; Ketley & Overdale; Madeley & Sutton Hill; Malinslee & Dawley Bank; Oakengates & Ketley Bank; Priorslee; St. Georges; The Nedge; Woodside; Wrockwardine Wood & Trench.

The Wrekin
Shropshire: Albrighton; Cheswardine; Hodnet; Shifnal North; Shifnal South & Cosford.

Telford and Wrekin: Admaston & Bratton; Apley Castle; Arleston; Church Aston & Lilleshall; College; Donnington; Dothill; Edgmond & Ercall Magna; Ercall; Hadley & Leegomery; Haygate; Muxton; Newport North & West; Newport South & East; Park; Shawbirch; Wrockwardine.

Tipton and Wednesbury
Dudley: Coseley East.

Sandwell: Friar Park; Great Bridge; Hateley Heath; Princes End; Tipton Green; Wednesbury North; Wednesbury South.

Walsall and Bloxwich
Walsall: Birchills Leamore; Blakenall; Bloxwich East; Bloxwich West; Paddock (polling districts UA, UB, UC & UD); Palfrey; Pleck; St. Matthew’s.

Warwick and Leamington
Warwick: Bishop’s Tachbrook; Leamington Brunswick; Leamington Clarendon; Leamington Lillington; Leamington Milverton; Leamington Willes; Radford Semele; Warwick All Saints & Woodloes; Warwick Aylesford; Warwick Myton & Heathcote; Warwick Saltisford; Whitnash.

West Bromwich
Sandwell: Charlemont with Grove Vale; Great Barr with Yew Tree; Greets Green & Lyng; Newton; Oldbury; Rowley; Tividale; West Bromwich Central.

West Worcestershire
Malvern Hills: Alfrick & Leigh; Baldwin; Broadheath; Chase; Dyson Perrins; Hallow; Kempsey; Lindridge; Link; Longdon; Martley; Morton; Pickersleigh; Powick; Priory; Ripple; Teme Valley; Tenbury; Upton & Hanley; Wells; West; Woodbury.

Wychavon: Bredon; Eckington; Elmley Castle & Somerville; Pershore; South Bredon Hill.

Wolverhampton North East
Walsall: Short Heath; Willenhall North.

Wolverhampton: Bushbury North; Bushbury South & Low Hill; Fallings Park; Heath Town; Wednesfield North; Wednesfield South.

Wolverhampton South East
Walsall: Bentley & Darlaston North; Darlaston South; Willenhall South.

Wolverhampton: Bilston East; Bilston North; East Park; Ettingshall; Spring Vale.

Wolverhampton West
Wolverhampton: Blakenhall; Graiseley; Merry Hill; Oxley; Park; Penn; St. Peter’s; Tettenhall Regis; Tettenhall Wightwick.

Worcester
Worcester: Arboretum; Battenhall; Bedwardine; Cathedral; Claines; Gorse Hill; Nunnery; Rainbow Hill; St Clement; St John; St Peter’s Parish; St Stephen; Warndon; Warndon Parish North; Warndon Parish South.

Wyre Forest
Wyre Forest: Aggborough & Spennells; Areley Kings & Riverside; Bewdley & Rock; Blakebrook & Habberley South; Broadwaters; Foley Park & Hoobrook; Franche & Habberley North; Lickhill; Mitton; Offmore & Comberton; Wribbenhall & Arley; Wyre Forest Rural.

== Yorkshire and the Humber ==
Barnsley North
Barnsley: Central; Cudworth; Darton East; Darton West; Monk Bretton; North East; Old Town; Royston; St. Helens.

Barnsley South
Barnsley: Darfield; Dearne North; Dearne South; Hoyland Milton; Kingstone; Rockingham; Stairfoot; Wombwell; Worsbrough.

Beverley and Holderness
East Riding: Beverley Rural; Mid Holderness; Minster & Woodmansey; St. Mary’s; South East Holderness; South West Holderness.

Bradford East
Bradford: Bolton & Undercliffe; Bowling & Barkerend (polling districts 5A, 5B, 5C, 5D, 5E, 5G & 5H); Bradford Moor; Eccleshill; Idle & Thackley; Little Horton.

Bradford South
Bradford: Bowling & Barkerend (polling district 5F); Great Horton; Queensbury; Royds; Tong; Wibsey; Wyke.

Bradford West
Bradford: City; Clayton & Fairweather Green; Heaton; Manningham Thornton & Allerton; Toller.

Bridlington and The Wolds
East Riding: Bridlington Central and Old Town; Bridlington North; Bridlington South; Driffield & Rural, East Wolds & Coastal, North Holderness, Wolds Weighton (polling districts ZC, ZD, ZG, ZH, ZI, ZJ, ZK, ZL, ZM, ZN, ZO, ZP, ZR, ZS, ZT, ZW, ZX (excluding Stamford Bridge Parish), ZZA, ZZB & ZZC).

Brigg and Immingham
North East Lincolnshire: Humberston & New Waltham; Immingham; Scartho; Waltham; Wolds.

North Lincolnshire: Barton; Brigg & Wolds; Broughton & Appleby; Ferry.

Calder Valley
Calderdale: Brighouse; Calder; Elland; Greetland & Stainland; Hipperholme & Lightcliffe; Luddendenfoot; Rastrick; Ryburn (polling districts MA, ME, MF, MG, MH, MJ & MK); Todmorden.

Colne Valley
Kirklees: Colne Valley; Golcar; Holme Valley North; Holme Valley South; Lindley.

Dewsbury and Batley
Kirklees: Batley East; Batley West; Dewsbury East; Dewsbury South; Dewsbury West; Kirkburton (polling districts KB04, KB07A, KB07B & KB10).

Doncaster Central
Doncaster: Armthorpe; Balby South; Bessacarr; Edenthorpe & Kirk Sandall; Hexthorpe & Balby North; Tickhill & Wadworth; Town; Wheatley Hills & Intake.

Doncaster East and the Isle of Axholme
Doncaster: Finningley; Hatfield; Rossington & Bawtry; Thorne & Moorends.

North Lincolnshire: Axholme Central; Axholme North; Axholme South.

Doncaster North
Doncaster: Adwick le Street & Carcroft; Bentley; Mexborough; Norton & Askern; Roman Ridge; Sprotbrough; Stainforth & Barnby Dun.

Goole and Pocklington
East Riding: Dale; Goole North; Goole South; Howden; Howdenshire; Pocklington Provincial; Snaith, Airmyn, Rawcliffe & Marshland; South Hunsley; Wolds Weighton (polling districts ZA, ZB, ZE, ZF, ZQ, ZU, ZV, ZX (Stamford Bridge Parish only), ZY & ZZ).

Great Grimsby and Cleethorpes
North East Lincolnshire: Croft Baker; East Marsh; Freshney; Haverstoe; Heneage; Park; Sidney Sussex; South; West Marsh; Yarborough.

Halifax
Calderdale: Illingworth & Mixenden; Northowram & Shelf; Ovenden; Park; Ryburn (polling districts MB, MC & MD); Skircoat; Sowerby Bridge; Town; Warley.

Harrogate and Knaresborough
Harrogate: Claro; Harrogate Bilton Grange; Harrogate Bilton Woodfield; Harrogate Central; Harrogate Coppice Valley; Harrogate Duchy; Harrogate Fairfax; Harrogate Harlow; Harrogate High Harrogate; Harrogate Hookstone; Harrogate Kingsley; Harrogate New Park; Harrogate Oatlands; Harrogate Old Bilton; Harrogate Pannal; Harrogate St. Georges; Harrogate Saltergate; Harrogate Starbeck; Harrogate Stray; Harrogate Valley Gardens; Killinghall & Hampsthwaite; Knaresborough Aspin & Calcutt; Knaresborough Castle; Knaresborough Eastfield; Knaresborough Scriven Park.

Huddersfield
Kirklees: Almondbury; Ashbrow; Crosland Moor & Netherton; Dalton (polling districts DA01, DA02, DA03, DA04, DA05, DA07 & DA08); Greenhead; Newsome.

Keighley and Ilkley
Bradford: Craven; Ilkley; Keighley Central; Keighley East; Keighley West; Worth Valley.

Kingston upon Hull East
Hull: Drypool; Holderness; Ings; Longhill & Bilton Grange; Marfleet; North Carr; Southcoates; Sutton.

Kingston upon Hull North and Cottingham
East Riding: Cottingham North; Cottingham South.

Hull: Avenue; Beverley & Newland; Bricknell; Central; Kingswood; Orchard Park; University; West Carr.

Kingston upon Hull West and Hessle
East Riding: Hessle; Tranby; Willerby & Kirk Ella.

Hull: Boothferry; Derringham; Newington & Gipsyville; Pickering; St. Andrew’s & Docklands.

Leeds Central and Headingley
Leeds: Headingley & Hyde Park; Kirkstall; Little London & Woodhouse; Weetwood.

Leeds East
Leeds: Cross Gates & Whinmoor; Garforth & Swillington; Gipton & Harehills; Killingbeck & Seacroft; Temple Newsam (polling districts TNB, TNC-X, TNC-Y, TNF & TNG).

Leeds North East
Leeds: Alwoodley; Chapel Allerton; Moortown; Roundhay.

Leeds North West
Leeds: Adel & Wharfedale; Guiseley & Rawdon; Horsforth; Otley & Yeadon.

Leeds South
Leeds: Beeston & Holbeck; Burmantofts & Richmond Hill; Hunslet & Riverside; Middleton Park; Temple Newsam (polling districts TNA, TND, TNE, TNH, TNI, TNJ, TNK & TNL).

Leeds South West and Morley
Leeds: Ardsley & Robin Hood; Farnley & Wortley; Morley North; Morley South.

Leeds West and Pudsey
Leeds: Armley; Bramley & Stanningley; Calverley & Farsley; Pudsey.

Normanton and Hemsworth
Wakefield: Ackworth, North Elmsall & Upton; Crofton, Ryhill & Walton; Featherstone; Hemsworth; Normanton; South Elmsall & South Kirkby.

Ossett and Denby Dale
Kirklees: Denby Dale; Kirkburton (polling districts KB01, KB02, KB03A, KB03B, KB05, KB06, KB08 & KB09).

Wakefield: Horbury & South Ossett; Ossett; Wakefield Rural; Wakefield South.

Penistone and Stocksbridge
Barnsley: Dodworth; Penistone East; Penistone West.

Sheffield: East Ecclesfield; Stocksbridge & Upper Don; West Ecclesfield.

Pontefract, Castleford and Knottingley
Wakefield: Airedale & Ferry Fryston; Altofts & Whitwood; Castleford Central & Glasshoughton; Knottingley; Pontefract North; Pontefract South.

Rawmarsh and Conisbrough
Doncaster: Conisbrough; Edlington & Warmsworth.

Rotherham: Bramley & Ravenfield; Hoober; Kilnhurst & Swinton East; Rawmarsh East; Rawmarsh West; Swinton Rockingham; Wath.

Richmond and Northallerton
Hambleton: Appleton Wiske & Smeatons; Great Ayton; Hutton Rudby; Morton-on-Swale; Northallerton North & Brompton; Northallerton South; Osmotherley & Swainby; Romanby; Stokesley.

Richmondshire: Catterick & Brompton-on-Swale; Colburn; Croft & Middleton Tyas; Gilling West; Hawes, High Abbotside & Upper Swaledale; Hipswell; Leyburn; Lower Swaledale & Arkengarthdale; Lower Wensleydale; Melsonby; Middleham; Richmond East; Richmond North; Richmond West; Scotton; Yoredale.

Rother Valley
Rotherham: Anston & Woodsetts; Aston & Todwick; Aughton & Swallownest; Dinnington; Hellaby & Maltby West; Maltby East; Sitwell; Thurcroft & Wickersley South; Wales.

Rotherham
Rotherham: Boston Castle; Brinsworth; Dalton & Thrybergh; Greasbrough; Keppel; Rother Vale; Rotherham East; Rotherham West; Wickersley North.

Scarborough and Whitby
Scarborough: Burniston & Cloughton; Castle; Cayton; Danby & Mulgrave; Derwent Valley & Moor; Eastfield; Esk Valley; Falsgrave & Stepney; Fylingdales & Ravenscar; Mayfield; Newby; Northstead; Scalby; Seamer; Streonshalh; Weaponness & Ramshill; Whitby West Cliff; Woodlands.

Scunthorpe
North Lincolnshire: Ashby; Bottesford; Brumby; Burringham & Gunness; Burton upon Stather & Winterton; Crosby & Park; Frodingham; Kingsway with Lincoln Gardens; Ridge; Town.

Selby
Leeds: Kippax & Methley.

Selby: Barlby Village; Brayton; Byram & Brotherton; Camblesforth & Carlton; Cawood & Wistow; Derwent; Eggborough; Escrick; Hambleton; Monk Fryston; Riccall; Selby East; Selby West; Sherburn in Elmet; South Milford; Thorpe Willoughby; Whitley.

Sheffield Brightside and Hillsborough
Sheffield: Burngreave; Firth Park; Hillsborough; Shiregreen & Brightside; Southey.

Sheffield Central
Sheffield: Broomhill & Sharrow Vale; City; Nether Edge & Sharrow; Walkley.

Sheffield Hallam
Sheffield: Crookes & Crosspool; Dore & Totley; Ecclesall; Fulwood; Stannington.

Sheffield Heeley
Sheffield: Beauchief & Greenhill; Gleadless Valley; Graves Park; Manor Castle; Park & Arbourthorne; Richmond (polling districts UB, UC & UE).

Sheffield South East
Sheffield: Beighton; Birley; Darnall; Mosborough; Richmond (polling districts UA, UD, UF, UG & UH); Woodhouse.

Shipley
Bradford: Baildon; Bingley; Bingley Rural; Shipley; Wharfedale; Windhill & Wrose.

Skipton and Ripon
Craven: Aire Valley with Lothersdale; Barden Fell; Bentham; Cowling; Embsay-with-Eastby; Gargrave & Malhamdale; Glusburn; Grassington; Hellifield & Long Preston; Ingleton & Clapham; Penyghent; Settle & Ribblebanks; Skipton East; Skipton North; Skipton South; Skipton West; Sutton-in-Craven; Upper Wharfedale; West Craven.

Harrogate: Fountains & Ripley; Masham & Kirkby Malzeard; Nidd Valley; Pateley Bridge & Nidderdale Moors; Ripon Minster; Ripon Moorside; Ripon Spa; Ripon Ure Bank; Washburn; Wathvale.

Spen Valley
Kirklees: Birstall & Birkenshaw; Cleckheaton; Dalton (polling district DA06); Heckmondwike; Liversedge & Gomersal; Mirfield.

Thirsk and Malton
Hambleton: Bagby & Thorntons; Bedale; Sowerby & Topcliffe; Tanfield; Thirsk.

Ryedale: Amotherby; Ampleforth; Cropton; Dales; Derwent; Helmsley; Hovingham; Kirkbymoorside; Malton; Norton East; Norton West; Pickering East; Pickering West; Rillington; Ryedale South West; Sherburn; Sheriff Hutton; Sinnington; Thornton Dale; Wolds.

Scarborough: Filey; Hunmanby.

Wakefield and Rothwell
Leeds: Rothwell.

Wakefield: Stanley & Outwood East; Wakefield East; Wakefield North; Wakefield West; Wrenthorpe & Outwood West.

Wetherby and Easingwold
Leeds: Harewood; Wetherby.

Hambleton: Easingwold; Huby; Raskelf & White Horse.

Harrogate: Bishop Monkton & Newby; Boroughbridge; Marston Moor; Ouseburn; Spofforth with Lower Wharfedale.

Selby: Appleton Roebuck & Church Fenton; Tadcaster.

York Central
York: Acomb; Clifton; Fishergate; Guildhall; Heworth; Holgate; Hull Road; Micklegate; Westfield.

York Outer
York: Bishopthorpe; Copmanthorpe; Dringhouses & Woodthorpe; Fulford & Heslington; Haxby & Wigginton; Heworth Without; Huntington & New Earswick; Osbaldwick & Derwent; Rawcliffe & Clifton Without; Rural West York; Strensall; Wheldrake.

== See also ==
- List of electoral wards in Wales
- Local Government in England
- Politics of England

== Sources ==
- The Parliamentary Constituencies Order 2023
