= Mia Kellmer Pringle =

Austrian-British psychologist (1920–1983)

Mia Lilly Kellmer Pringle
- Born: 20 June 1920; Vienna
- Died: 21 February 1983 (aged 62); London
- Spouse(s): William Joseph Somerville Pringle (1946-1962); William Leonard Hooper (m. 1969)
- Children: David, Rose

Academic background
- Education: Birkbeck College
- Thesis: A study of Doll's social maturity scale as applied to a representative sample of British children between the age of 6 and 8 years (1950)

Academic work
- Discipline: Child Psychology
- Institutions: University of Birmingham

Mia Lilly Kellmer Pringle (20 June 1920 – 21 February 1983) was an Austrian-British child psychologist. She was the founding director of the British National Children's Bureau, where she oversaw the influential National Child Development Study. Over the course of her career, Pringle advocated for the needs and rights of children both through her research-informed policy work and in her many books and articles about early childhood development.

== Early life and education ==
Mia Kellmer Pringle was born in Vienna to Samuel Kellmer and Sophie Sobel. Her younger brother Chanan Kella was her only sibling. Samuel Kellmer was a successful timber wholesaler, and the family was comfortably-middle class. Their circumstances changed swiftly after the annexation of Austria into Nazi Germany in 1938, and Pringle and her mother were forced to flee to London as refugees. This was a traumatic experience of poverty and displacement: Pringle was suddenly responsible for supporting herself and her mother. She made ends meet by working variously at Woolworths, in primary schools, and as a secretary, all while learning English.

Pringle attended Birkbeck College, studying part-time so she could continue to hold a job. She earned a BA in psychology with first-class honours in 1944, then received her qualification as an educational and clinical psychologist from the London Child Guidance Training Centre in 1945. She continued her studies, working toward a PhD at Birckbeck College while serving as a psychologist for the Hertfordshire Child Guidance Service. Her PhD thesis, completed in 1950, was titled "A study of Doll's social maturity scale as applied to a representative sample of British children between the age of 6 and 8 years."

== Career ==
Pringle taught at the Department of Child Study (then known as the Remedial Education Centre) at the University of Birmingham from 1950-1963. She advanced from lecturer to senior lecturer, and eventually became deputy head of the department, helping to build its reputation as a center for research and training. Her academic work there focused on education for disabled children and the proper care of children in institutional settings.

=== Publications ===
Over the course of her career Pringle wrote and edited 20 books and numerous articles about the care of children and their development, including "Adoption: Facts and Fallacies" (1964). Some of her positions were controversial, notably her opposition to employment for mothers of children under five years of age.

Her most influential book was "The Needs of Children" (1974), which was translated into German, Swedish, and French. It draws on the work of other specialists in child development, including John Bowlby and Donald Winnicott, as well as on her own practice and experience in the field. The book emphasizes the importance of the early years of development and the setting in which that development takes place, as well as the need to consider children's emotional, social, and physical needs equally. It identifies four needs as crucial for healthy development in early childhood: love and security, new experiences, praise and recognition, and responsibility.

=== National Children's Bureau ===
In 1963 Pringle became the first director of the National Children's Bureau, then known as the National Bureau for Co-operation in Childcare. The bureau began as a small-scale operation with four employees, including Pringle herself. Its mission was to foster communication and collaboration among all professionals and service providers specializing in childhood development, to promote research pertaining to children, to advocate for improved children's services, and to pair policy recommendations with hard research in related fields. Over the course of 18 years she built it into a lasting institution with 65 staff members and a dedicated building.

Pringle was skilled at raising funds for NCB projects, often circumventing bureaucratic obstacles by going directly to ministers with her appeals. She was known for her insistence on combining research with practice, bridging the realms of academic theory and public policy in order to better understand and address the needs of children. Pringle remained director of the NCB until her retirement in 1981.

==== National Child Development Study ====
The NCB's most important project under her leadership was the National Child Development Study, a longitudinal study of 17,000 British children that was initiated by Dr. Neville Butler in his Perinatal Mortality Survey of 1958 and began officially under the auspices of the NCB in 1964. As co-director, Pringle raised key funds and brought institutional support to the cohort study, which involved a team of researchers returning to the same group of children at intervals of seven years to study their development. The study's findings were published in the book "Born To Fail?" (1973) and emphasized the long-term consequences of adverse conditions in early childhood.

=== Other roles ===
In addition to her work with the National Children's Bureau, Pringle served on the Birmingham Local Education Authority and on many other working groups, committees, and school boards. These included an influential 1950s UNESCO working group focused on psychological services for schools, as well as the Secretary of State's Advisory Committee on Handicapped Children and the Advisory Council on Child Care.

She served as chair of the Association for Child Psychology and Psychiatry, and was named an honorary life member of the organization. She was a member of the editorial board of the Journal of Early Child Development and Care.

After her retirement, she continued to advocate for children as a consultant with UNICEF.

== Personal life ==
Pringle was noted for her personal reserve and commanding leadership style, as well as her engaging intelligence and wit.

On 18 April 1946 she married William Joseph Somerville Pringle, a chemist and the son of MP William Mather Rutherford Pringle. After his death in 1962, she remarried in 1969 to William Leonard Hooper, who worked as an assistant director-general for the Greater London Council.

Pringle suffered from clinical depression which was greatly aggravated by the death of her second husband without whom she found it increasingly difficult to function. She died by suicide at the age of 62 in her flat at 68 Wimpole Street, Westminster, leaving an estate valued at £145,051.

== Legacy and honors ==
Mia Kellmer Pringle received honorary doctorates from the University of Bradford, Aston University, and the University of Hull, and was named an honorary fellow of Manchester Polytechnic, the College of Preceptors, and Birkbeck College.

In 1970 she was awarded the Henrietta Szold Prize for her services to children. She became a CBE in 1975.

== List of works ==
- The Emotional and Social Adjustment of Blind Children (Slough, NFER, 1964)
- The Emotional and Social Adjustment of Physically Handicapped Children (Slough, NFER, 1964)
- Deprivation and Education (Longman, 1965)
- Investment in Children (Longman, 1965)
- Adoption: Facts and Fallacies (Longman, 1966)
- 11,000 Seven-Year-Olds (Longman, 1966, with Butler, N.R. and Davie, R.)
- Four Years On (Longman, 1966, with Gooch, S.)
- Social Learning and its Measurement (Longman, 1966)
- Foster Home Care – Facts and Fallacies (Longman, 1967, with Dinnage, R.)
- Residential Child Care – Facts and Fallacies (Longman, 1967, with Dinnage, R.)
- Caring for Children (Longman, 1969)
- Able Misfits (Longman, 1970)
- The Challenge of Thalidomide (Longman, 1970, with Fiddes, D. O.)
- Living with Handicap (Longman, 1970, with Younghusband, E., Birchall, D., and Davie, R.)
- Born Illegitimate (Slough, NFER, 1971, with Crellin, E. and Wedge, P.)
- Growing Up Adopted (Slough, NFER, 1972, with Seglow, J. and Wedge, P.)
- The Effects of Disadvantage on Educational Attainment (Council for Education Advance, 1973)
- Advances in Educational Psychology 2 (University of London Press, 1974, with Varma, V.P., Eds.)
- The Needs of Children (Hutchinson, 1974)
- Early Child Care in Britain (Gordon and Breach, 1975, with Naidoo, S.)
- Controversial Issues in Child Development (Elek, 1978, with Pilling, D.)
- A Brief Account of the Bureau's History and Main Achievements (1979)
- A Fairer Future for Children: Better Parental and Professional Care (Macmillan, 1980)
- Investment in Children (University of Exeter, 1982)
