= Union of Congregational Churches in Brazil =

The Union of Evangelical Congregational Churches in Brazil is an association of churches of Congregational origin in Brazil. It was founded by a couple namely Robert Reid Kalley and Sarah Poulton Kalley, who arrived in Rio de Janeiro in May 1855 to begin mission work. The work developed. The first believer was baptised in November, 1857. In 1858 the first church was organised. The evangelists and the Kalley's work spread to the North-eastern part of Brasil, specially in Recife and Pernambuco state. Robert and Sarah Kalley returned to Scotland in 1876. In 1913 thirteen church formed the United Independent Evangelical Churches. Robert died in 1888 but Sarah continued to raise funds for Brazil. She died in 1907. In 1942 Congregational churches united to form the Evangelical Christian Churches in Brazil. Later it became the Union of Evangelical Congregational Churches in Brazil.

The church has 350 congregations and 500 ordained ministers. Member of World Evangelical Congregational Fellowship. The church has two Seminaries called the Congregational Seminary in Rio de Janeiro and the Northeastern Congregational Seminary.

The church is the Brazilian Evangelical Christian Alliance.
