= Michael Clapham =

British Labour Party politician

Member of Parliament for Barnsley West and Penistone
- In office 9 April 1992 – 12 April 2010
- Preceded by: Allen McKay
- Succeeded by: Constituency abolished

Personal details
- Born: 15 May 1943 (age 83) Darton, West Riding of Yorkshire, England
- Party: Labour
- Spouse: Yvonne Hallsworth
- Education: University of Leeds, University of Bradford, Leeds Metropolitan University

Michael Clapham (born 15 May 1943) is a British Labour Party politician, who was the Member of Parliament (MP) for Barnsley West and Penistone from 1992 to 2010.

== Early life ==
Born in Darton, in Barnsley, Clapham was educated at the Darton Secondary Modern School on Churchfield Lane (now Darton High School) and the Barnsley Technical College. After leaving school in 1958, he was a coal miner for 12 years before he returned to education at Leeds Polytechnic, where he received a Bachelor of Science degree with honours in 1973. He earned a Postgraduate Certificate in Education at the University of Leeds in 1974, and a Master of Philosophy at the University of Bradford in 1990.

In 1974, he lectured in trade union studies at the Whitwood College in Castleford (now the Whitwood Campus of Wakefield College), before joining the National Union of Mineworkers in 1977 as a claims officer, becoming its head of industrial relations in 1983, the position he held for the duration of the miners' strike of 1984–1985, he stepped down on his election to the House of Commons in 1992.

== Parliamentary career ==
Clapham was the treasurer of the Barnsley West and Penistone Constituency Labour Party after 1983. He was elected as the MP there at the 1992 General Election following the retirement of Allen McKay, holding the seat with a majority of 14,504. He made his maiden speech, speaking on the concerns in the local coal mining industry, on 6 May 1992.

Clapham is a left-winger and was a member of the Socialist Campaign Group, rebelling against the government on various issues. He was a member of the Trade and Industry Committee from 1992 to 1997 and again from 2003; in between he was Parliamentary Private Secretary to Alan Milburn following the 1997 general election, but he resigned over Harriet Harman's decision to cut lone parent benefits in December of that year. He used to be very loyal to his old boss Arthur Scargill, but later criticised him for being too Stalinist.

His voting record shows him to be against many of Tony Blair's policies, including ID cards, student top-up fees and the Iraq war.

Clapham announced he would stand down at the next general election; his constituency became part of the new constituency of Penistone and Stocksbridge.

== Personal life ==
Clapham is a Distinguished Supporter of Humanists UK. He is also a supporter of Republic, a campaign to replace the British monarchy with an elected head of state. He has been married to Yvonne Hallsworth since 1965 and they have a son and a daughter.
