= Education Select Committee =

UK House of Commons select committee

The Education Select Committee is a select committee of the House of Commons in the Parliament of the United Kingdom. The remit of the committee is to examine the expenditure, administration and policy of the Department for Education and any associated public bodies.

The chair of the committee until 2024 was Robin Walker MP. Previous chairs include Robert Halfon MP (2017–2022), Neil Carmichael (2015–17) and Graham Stuart MP (2010–2015).

== Chairs ==
Committee chairs include those listed below.

Name	Start	End	Party	Constituency
Malcolm Thornton	1 January 1995	21 March 1997	Conservative	Liverpool Garston
Margaret Hodge	21 March 1997	9 November 1998	Labour	Barking
Malcolm Wicks	9 November 1998	29 November 1999	Labour	Croydon North
Barry Sheerman	16 July 2001	6 May 2010	Labour Co-op	Huddersfield
Graham Stuart	10 June 2010	30 March 2015	Conservative	Beverley and Holderness
Neil Carmichael	18 June 2015	3 May 2017	Conservative	Stroud
Robert Halfon	12 July 2017	27 October 2022	Conservative	Harlow
Robin Walker	16 November 2022	30 May 2024	Conservative	Worcester
Helen Hayes	11 September 2024	present	Labour	Dulwich and West Norwood

=== Election results ===
From June 2010 chairs of select committees have been directly elected by a secret ballot of the whole House of Commons using the alternative vote system. Candidates with the fewest votes are eliminated and their votes redistributed until one remaining candidate has more than half of valid votes. Elections are held at the beginning of a parliament or in the event of a vacancy.

Chair	Party	Constituency	First elected	Method
Helen Hayes MP	Labour	Dulwich and West Norwood	11 September	Elected by the House of Commons
Robin Walker MP	Conservative	Worcester	16 November 2022	Elected by the House of Commons
Robert Halfon MP	Conservative	Harlow	12 July 2017	Elected by the House of Commons
Neil Carmichael MP	Conservative	Stroud	18 June 2015	Elected by the House of Commons
Graham Stuart MP	Conservative	Beverley and Holderness	9 June 2010	Elected by the House of Commons
Previously as Children, Schools and Families Select Committee
Barry Sheerman MP	Labour Co-op	Huddersfield	12 November 2007	Elected by the Select Committee
Previously as Education and Skills Select Committee
Barry Sheerman MP	Labour Co-op	Huddersfield	16 July 2001	Elected by the Select Committee

16 November 2022
Candidate	1st round		2nd round	
Candidate	Votes	%	Votes	%
Helen Hayes	263	47.2	312	59.3
Sharon Hodgson	197	35.4	214	40.7
Marie Tidball	97	17.4	Eliminated	
Not redistributed			31	5.6
Valid votes	557		526	

16 November 2022
Candidate	1st round		2nd round	
Candidate	Votes	%	Votes	%
Robin Walker	217	48.1	228	52.3
Caroline Ansell	108	23.9	124	28.4
David Simmonds	70	15.5	84	19.3
Jonathan Gullis	56	12.4	Eliminated	
Not redistributed			15	3.3
Valid votes	451		436	

27 January 2020
Candidate	1st round	
Candidate	Votes	%
Robert Halfon	Unopposed	

12 July 2017
Candidate	1st round		2nd round		3rd round		4th round		5th round	
Candidate	Votes	%	Votes	%	Votes	%	Votes	%	Votes	%
Robert Halfon	136	23.8	141	25.1	152	27.7	185	35.7	261	55.1
Nick Boles	129	22.6	137	24.4	153	27.9	178	34.4	213	44.9
Dan Poulter	109	19.1	112	20.0	127	23.2	155	29.9	Eliminated	
Tim Loughton	101	17.7	104	18.5	116	21.2	Eliminated			
Stephen Metcalfe	63	11.0	67	11.9	Eliminated					
Rehman Chishti	33	5.8	Eliminated							
Not redistributed			10	1.8	23	4.0	53	9.3	97	17.0
Valid votes	571		561		548		518		474	

17 June 2015
Candidate	1st round		2nd round	
Candidate	Votes	%	Votes	%
Neil Carmichael	224	37.5	294	53.8
Tim Loughton	191	32.0	252	46.2
Caroline Nokes	182	30.5	Eliminated	
Not redistributed			51	8.5
Valid votes	597		546	

9 June 2010
Candidate	1st round		2nd round		3rd round	
Candidate	Votes	%	Votes	%	Votes	%
Graham Stuart	192	36.6	210	42.2	244	52.5
Rob Wilson	159	30.3	183	36.7	221	47.5
Lee Scott	92	17.5	105	21.1	Eliminated	
Andrew Turner	82	15.6	Eliminated			
Not redistributed			27	5.1	60	11.4
Valid votes	525		498		465	

== Current membership ==
On 5 September 2024, nominations for the role were opened with the candidates being Labour MPs Sharon Hodgson, Marie Tidball and Helen Hayes. Hayes was elected. The full membership as of 29 October 2024 is:

Member	Party	Constituency
Helen Hayes MP (Chair)	Labour	Dulwich and West Norwood
Jess Asato MP	Labour	Lowestoft
Sureena Brackenridge MP	Labour	Wolverhampton North East
Jodie Gosling MP	Labour	Nuneaton
Caroline Johnson MP	Conservative	Sleaford and North Hykeham
Darren Paffey MP	Labour	Southampton Itchen
Rebecca Paul MP	Conservative	Reigate
Manuela Perteghella MP	Lib Dems	Stratford-on-Avon
Mark Sewards MP	Labour	Leeds South West and Morley
Peter Swallow MP	Labour	Bracknell
Caroline Voaden MP	Lib Dems	South Devon

=== Changes since 2024 ===
Date	Outgoing Member & Party	Constituency	→	New Member & Party	Constituency	Source
30 June 2025	Patrick Spencer MP (Independent)	Central Suffolk and North Ipswich	→	James Cleverly MP (Conservative)	Braintree	Hansard
28 October 2025	Amanda Martin MP (Labour)	Portsmouth North	→	Peter Swallow MP (Labour)	Bracknell	Hansard
28 October 2025	Marie Tidball MP (Labour)	Penistone and Stocksbridge	→	Chris Vince MP (Labour)	Harlow	Hansard
1 December 2025	James Cleverly MP (Conservative)	Braintree	→	Rebecca Paul MP (Conservative)	Reigate	Hansard
22 June 2026	Chris Vince MP (Labour)	Harlow	→	Jodie Gosling MP (Labour)	Nuneaton	Hansard

== 2019–2024 Parliament ==
The chair was elected on 27 January 2020, with the members of the committee being announced on 2 March 2020.

Member	Party	Constituency
Robert Halfon MP (Chair)	Conservative	Harlow
Fleur Anderson MP	Labour	Putney
Apsana Begum MP	Labour	Poplar and Limehouse
Jonathan Gullis MP	Conservative	Stoke-on-Trent North
Tom Hunt MP	Conservative	Ipswich
Dr Caroline Johnson MP	Conservative	Sleaford and North Hykeham
David Johnston MP	Conservative	Wantage
Ian Mearns MP	Labour	Gateshead
Lucy Powell MP	Labour Co-op	Manchester Central
David Simmonds MP	Conservative	Ruislip, Northwood and Pinner
Christian Wakeford MP	Conservative	Bury South

=== Changes 2019–2024 ===
Occasionally, the House of Commons orders changes to be made in terms of membership of select committees, as proposed by the Committee of Selection. Such changes are shown below.

Date	Outgoing Member & Party	Constituency	→	New Member & Party	Constituency	Source
11 May 2020	Fleur Anderson MP (Labour)	Putney	→	Dawn Butler MP (Labour)	Brent Central	Hansard
11 May 2020	Lucy Powell MP (Labour and Co-op)	Manchester Central	→	Kim Johnson MP (Labour)	Liverpool Riverside	Hansard
21 September 2020	Dawn Butler MP (Labour)	Brent Central	→	Fleur Anderson MP (Labour)	Putney	Hansard
13 July 2021	Fleur Anderson MP (Labour)	Putney	→	Mohammad Yasin MP (Labour)	Bedford	
7 September 2021	Jonathan Gullis MP (Conservative)	Stoke-on-Trent North	→	Nicola Richards MP (Conservative)	West Bromwich East	Hansard
19 October 2021	David Johnston MP (Conservative)	Wantage	→	Miriam Cates MP (Conservative)	Penistone and Stocksbridge	Hansard
19 October 2021	David Simmonds MP (Conservative)	Ruislip, Northwood and Pinner	→	Brendan Clarke-Smith MP (Conservative)	Bassetlaw	Hansard
15 March 2022	Brendan Clarke-Smith MP (Conservative)	Bassetlaw	→	Caroline Ansell MP (Conservative)	Eastbourne	Hansard
15 March 2022	Christian Wakeford MP (Labour)	Bury South	→	Anna Firth MP (Conservative)	Southend West	Hansard
29 March 2022	Nicola Richards MP (Conservative)	West Bromwich East	→	Angela Richardson MP (Conservative)	Guildford	Hansard
25 October 2022	Dr Caroline Johnson MP (Conservative)	Sleaford and North Hykeham	→	Andrew Lewer MP (Conservative)	Northampton South	Hansard
27 October 2022	Robert Halfon MP (Chair, Conservative)	Harlow	→	Vacant		Hansard
8 November 2022	Tom Hunt MP (Conservative)	Ipswich	→	Flick Drummond MP (Conservative)	Meon Valley	Hansard
16 November 2022	Vacant		→	Robin Walker MP (Chair, Conservative)	Worcester	Hansard
29 November 2022	Angela Richardson MP (Conservative)	Guildford	→	Nick Fletcher MP (Conservative)	Don Valley	Hansard
13 March 2023	Kate Osborne MP (Labour)	Jarrow	→	Mohammad Yasin MP (Labour)	Bedford	Hansard
22 January 2024	Miriam Cates MP (Conservative)	Penistone and Stocksbridge	→	Vicky Ford MP (Conservative)	Chelmsford	Hansard
30 April 2024	Apsana Begum MP (Labour)	Poplar and Limehouse	→	Gen Kitchen MP (Labour)	Wellingborough	Hansard
30 April 2024	Kim Johnson MP (Labour)	Liverpool Riverside	→	Jess Phillips MP (Labour)	Birmingham Yardley	Hansard

== 2017–2019 Parliament ==
The chair was elected on 12 July 2017, with the members of the committee being announced on 11 September 2017.

Member	Party	Constituency
Robert Halfon MP (Chair)	Conservative	Harlow
Lucy Allan MP	Conservative	Telford
Michelle Donelan MP	Conservative	Chippenham
Marion Fellows MP	Scottish National Party	Motherwell and Wishaw
James Frith MP	Labour	Bury North
Emma Hardy MP	Labour	Kingston upon Hull West and Hessle
Trudy Harrison MP	Conservative	Copeland
Ian Mearns MP	Labour	Gateshead
Lucy Powell MP	Labour	Manchester Central
Thelma Walker MP	Labour	Colne Valley
William Wragg MP	Conservative	Hazel Grove

=== Changes 2017–2019 ===
Date	Outgoing Member & Party	Constituency	→	New Member & Party	Constituency	Source
22 October 2018	Michelle Donelan MP (Conservative)	Chippenham	→	Ben Bradley MP (Conservative)	Mansfield	Hansard

== 2015–2017 Parliament ==
The chair was elected on 18 June 2015, with members being announced on 6 July 2015.

Member	Party	Constituency
Neil Carmichael MP (Chair)	Conservative	Stroud
Lucy Allan MP	Conservative	Telford
Ian Austin MP	Labour	Dudley North
Michelle Donelan MP	Conservative	Chippenham
Marion Fellows MP	Scottish National Party	Motherwell and Wishaw
Suella Fernandes MP	Conservative	Fareham
Lucy Frazer MP	Conservative	South East Cambridgeshire
Kate Hollern MP	Labour	Blackburn
Ian Mearns MP	Labour	Gateshead
Caroline Nokes MP	Conservative	Romsey and Southampton North
Kate Osamor MP	Labour	Edmonton

=== Changes 2015–2017 ===
Date	Outgoing Member & Party	Constituency	→	New Member & Party	Constituency	Source
1 February 2016	Kate Hollern MP (Labour)	Blackburn	→	Catherine McKinnell MP (Labour)	Newcastle upon Tyne North	Hansard
1 February 2016	Kate Osamor MP (Labour)	Edmonton	→	Stephen Timms MP (Labour)	East Ham	Hansard
22 February 2016	Caroline Nokes MP (Conservative)	Romsey and Southampton North	→	William Wragg MP (Conservative)	Hazel Grove	Hansard
31 October 2016	Stephen Timms MP (Labour)	East Ham	→	Lilian Greenwood MP (Labour)	Nottingham South	Hansard

== 2010–2015 Parliament ==
The chair was elected on 10 June 2010, with members being announced on 12 July 2010.

Member	Party	Constituency
Graham Stuart MP (Chair)	Conservative	Beverley and Holderness
Conor Burns MP	Conservative	Bournemouth West
Nic Dakin MP	Labour	Scunthorpe
Pat Glass MP	Labour	North West Durham
Damian Hinds MP	Conservative	East Hampshire
Liz Kendall MP	Labour	Leicester West
Charlotte Leslie MP	Conservative	Bristol North West
Ian Mearns MP	Labour	Gateshead
Tessa Munt MP	Liberal Democrats	Wells
Lisa Nandy MP	Labour	Wigan
Craig Whittaker MP	Conservative	Calder Valley

=== Changes 2010–2015 ===
Date	Outgoing Member & Party	Constituency	→	New Member & Party	Constituency	Source
2 November 2010	Conor Burns MP (Conservative)	Bournemouth West	→	Neil Carmichael MP (Conservative)	Stroud	Hansard
2 November 2010	Liz Kendall MP (Labour)	Leicester West	→	Bill Esterson MP (Labour)	Sefton Central	Hansard
31 October 2016	Nic Dakin MP (Labour)	Scunthorpe	→	Alex Cunningham MP (Labour)	Stockton North	Hansard
11 June 2012	Tessa Munt MP (Liberal Democrats)	Wells	→	David Ward MP (Liberal Democrats)	Bradford East	Hansard
10 September 2012	Lisa Nandy MP (Labour)	Wigan	→	Siobhain McDonagh MP (Labour)	Mitcham and Morden	Hansard
5 November 2012	Damian Hinds MP (Conservative)	East Hampshire	→	Chris Skidmore MP (Conservative)	Kingswood	Hansard
4 November 2013	Charlotte Leslie MP (Conservative)	Bristol North West	→	Dominic Raab MP (Conservative)	Esher and Walton	Hansard
18 March 2014	Chris Skidmore MP (Conservative)	Kingswood	→	Caroline Nokes MP (Conservative)	Romsey and Southampton North	Hansard

== Publications ==
=== 2017 - 2019 Parliament ===
Date	Title	Government response
8 October 2018	Sixth Report of the Session 2017–19: The apprenticeships ladder of opportunity: quality not quantity	Awaited
25 July 2018	Fifth Report of Session 2017–19: Forgotten children: alternative provision and the scandal of ever increasing exclusions	Awaited
13 July 2018	Fourth Report of Session 2017–19: Appointment of the Chair of the Social Mobility Commission	N/A
9 May 2018	Third Report of Session 2017–19: The Government’s Green Paper on mental health: failing a generation	Government Response to the Committee’s Third Report of Session 2017–19
22 March 2018	Second Report of Session 2017–19: The future of the Social Mobility Commission	Government Response to the Committee’s Second Report of Session 2017–19
22 December 2017	First Report of Session 2017–19: Fostering	Government Response to the Committee’s First Report of Session 2017–19

=== 2015-17 Parliament ===
Date	Title	Government response
2 May 2017	Eleventh Report of Session 2016–17: Primary assessment	Government Response to the Committee’s Eleventh Report of Session 2016–17
1 May 2017	Tenth Report of Session 2016–17: Children and young people's mental health—the role of education	Government Response to the Committee’s Tenth Report of Session 2016–17
25 April 2017	Ninth Report of Session 2016–17: Exiting the EU: challenges and opportunities for higher education	Government Response to the Committee’s Ninth Report of Session 2016–17
31 March 2017	Eighth Report of Session 2016–17: Apprenticeships	Government Response to the Committee’s Eighth Report of Session 2016–17
28 February 2017	Seventh Report of Session 2016–17: Multi-academy trusts	Government Response to the Committee’s Seventh Report of Session 2016–17
24 February 2017	Sixth Report of Session 2016–17: Appointment of the Chair of the Office for Students	N/A
21 February 2017	Fifth Report of Session 2016–17: Recruitment and retention of teachers	Government Response to the Committee’s Fifth Report of Session 2016–17
13 February 2017	Fourth Report of Session 2016–17: Evidence check: Grammar schools	Government Response to the Committee’s Fourth Report of Session 2016–17
13 July 2016	Third Report of Session 2016–17: Social work reform	Government Response to the Committee’s Third Report of Session 2016–17
7 July 2016	Second Report of Session 2016–17: Appointment of Her Majesty’s Chief Inspector of Education, Children’s Services and Skills	Government Response to the Committee’s Second Report of Session 2016–17
5 July 2016	First Report of Session 2016–17: Careers education, information, advice and guidance	Government Response to the Committee’s First Report of Session 2016–17
28 April 2016	Fourth Report of Session 2015–16: Mental health and well-being of looked-after children	Government Response to the Committee’s Fourth Report of Session 2015–16
20 March 2016	Third Report of Session 2015–16: Appointment of the Chief Regulator of Ofqual	N/A
24 January 2016	Second Report of Session 2015–16: Holocaust education	Government Response to the Committee’s Second Report of Session 2015–16
20 January 2016	First Report of Session 2015–16: The role of Regional Schools Commissioners	Government Response to the Committee’s First Report of Session 2015–16

== See also ==
- Select committee (United Kingdom)
- British House of Commons
- Parliamentary committees of the United Kingdom
