= 1912 Holmfirth by-election =

UK parliamentary by-election

The 1912 Holmfirth by-election was a Parliamentary by-election held on 20 June 1912. The constituency returned one Member of Parliament (MP) to the House of Commons of the United Kingdom, elected by the first past the post voting system.

== Vacancy and electoral history ==
The local Liberal MP Henry Wilson resigned from parliament at the age of 79. He had been MP here since the seat was created in 1885. At the last general election, he was returned unopposed. The last contested election was the previous election;

General election January 1910 Electorate 12,788
Party	Candidate	Votes	%	±%
Liberal	Henry Wilson	6,339	57.5	−14.4
Liberal Unionist	Geoffrey Ellis	3,043	27.6	−0.5
Labour	William Pickles	1,643	14.9	New
Majority		3,296	29.9	−13.9
Turnout		11,025	86.2	+8.2
Liberal hold		Swing	-7.0	

== Candidates ==
The Liberal candidate selected was 34-year-old Sydney Arnold. He had contested neighbouring Holderness for the Liberals at the last election. He had been educated at Manchester Grammar School and had been a Member of Manchester Stock Exchange since 1904. The Unionists re-selected 38-year-old Geoffrey Ellis from Shipley, West Yorkshire. Ellis was educated at Peterhouse, Cambridge. Since 1910 he worked for Beckett & Co., Bankers, of Leeds. Although he did not contest the December 1910 general election, he contested the previous general election in January 1910. The Labour Party selected 40-year-old William Lunn. He was educated at Rothwell Board School. He was a check-weighman who had started work in the pit at 12 years of age.

== Campaign ==
Polling Day was set for 20 June 1912, just 15 days after the resignation of the previous MP. The constituency contained a mixture of mining, agriculture and textile industries. Arnold was a committed supporter of a Land value tax which he featured in his campaign. David Lloyd George the Liberal Chancellor of the Exchequer sent Arnold a public message in which he said Britain needed to "recast our present absurd land system." Lunn was importantly backed by the Yorkshire Miners' Association which not only assured him of organised support but went some way to ensuring that much of the third of the electorate involved in mining, would support him at the ballot box.

== Result ==
The Liberal Party held the seat.

Sydney Arnold

Holmfirth by-election, 1912 Electorate 13,035
Party	Candidate	Votes	%	±%
Liberal	Sydney Arnold	4,749	42.0	−15.5
Unionist	Geoffrey Ellis	3,379	29.8	+2.2
Labour	William Lunn	3,195	28.2	+13.3
Majority		1,370	12.2	−17.7
Turnout		11,323	86.9	+0.7
Liberal hold		Swing	-8.8	

The percentage change in vote share is calculated from the last contested election in January 1910.

== Aftermath ==
A general election was due to take place by the end of 1915. By the autumn of 1914, the following candidates had been adopted to contest that election. Due to the outbreak of war, the election never took place.

General Election 1914/15: Holmfirth Electorate 13,467
Party	Candidate	Votes	%	±%
Liberal	Sydney Arnold			
Labour	William Lunn			

Arnold was elected for the re-drawn seat of Penistone in 1918. Ellis was elected for the seat of Wakefield in 1922. Lunn went on to be elected for Rothwell in 1918.

General election 14 December 1918: Penistone Electorate 31,298
Party	Candidate	Votes	%	±%
Liberal	Sydney Arnold	7,338	39.4	
Unionist	Phillip Gatty Smith	6,744	36.2	
Independent Labour	Frederick William Southern	4,556	24.4	
Majority		594	3.2	
Turnout		18,638	58.4	
Liberal win (new seat)				

- Smith was the endorsed candidate of the Coalition Government.
