= Helen Mary Wilson =

Helen Mary Wilson may refer to:

- Helen Wilson (writer) (1869–1957), New Zealand teacher, farmer, community leader and writer
- Helen Mary Wilson (physician) (1864–1951), English physician and social purity campaigner
