= 1978 Penistone by-election =

UK parliamentary by-election

A 1978 by-election was held for the British House of Commons constituency of Penistone on 13 July 1978. The seat had become vacant on the death of the Labour Member of Parliament John Mendelson, who had held the seat since a by-election in 1959.

The result was a hold for the Labour Party.

Penistone by-election, 1978
Party	Candidate	Votes	%	±%
Labour	Allen McKay	19,424	45.5	−8.7
Conservative	I. Dobkin	14,053	32.9	+8.9
Liberal	D. Chadwick	9,241	21.6	−0.2
Majority		5,371	12.6	−17.6
Turnout		42,718		
Labour hold		Swing		

== See also ==
- Penistone constituency
- 1921 Penistone by-election
- 1959 Penistone by-election
- Penistone
- Lists of United Kingdom by-elections
