= Rennie Smith =

British politician (1888–1962)

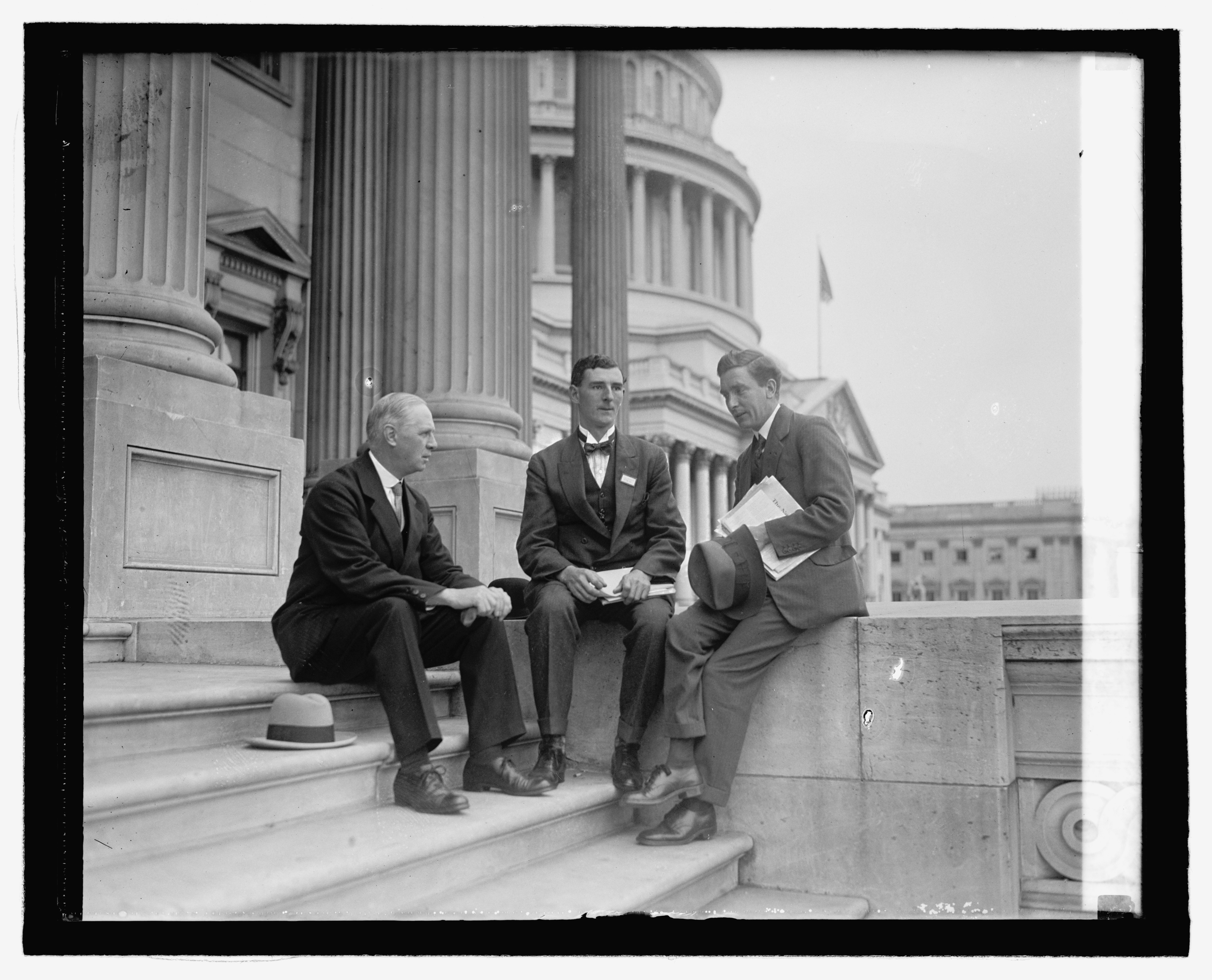
Ben Riley, Tom Williams, Rennie Smith of Great Britain in 1925

Rennie Smith (14 April 1888 – 25 May 1962) was a Labour Party politician in the United Kingdom who served as a Member of Parliament (MP) from 1924 to 1931.

At the 1924 general election he was elected as MP for Penistone in Yorkshire, defeating the sitting Liberal MP William Pringle, against whom Smith had stood unsuccessfully in 1923.

Smith held the seat in 1929, but was defeated at the 1931 general election as Labour's vote collapsed following the party's split over Prime Minister Ramsay MacDonald's formation of a National Government. He did not stand for parliament again.

== Sources ==
- Craig, F. W. S. (1983) [1969]. British parliamentary election results 1918–1949 (3rd ed.). Chichester: Parliamentary Research Services. ISBN 0-900178-06-X.
- Leigh Rayment's Historical List of MPs

Parliament of the United Kingdom
Preceded by William Pringle	Member of Parliament for Penistone; 1924–1931	Succeeded by Clifford Glossop
