= 1959 Penistone by-election =

UK parliamentary by-election

A 1959 by-election was held for the British House of Commons constituency of Penistone in South Yorkshire on 11 June 1959. The seat had become vacant on the death of the Labour Member of Parliament Henry McGhee, who had held the seat since the 1935 general election.

== Result ==
The result was a hold for the Labour Party.

Penistone by-election, 1959
Party	Candidate	Votes	%	±%
Labour	John Mendelson	25,315	64.1	+1.8
Conservative	John Bedford Deby	14,196	35.9	−1.8
Majority		11,119	28.2	+3.6
Turnout		39,511		
Labour hold		Swing	+1.8	

== See also ==
- Penistone constituency
- 1921 Penistone by-election
- 1978 Penistone by-election
- Town of Penistone
- List of United Kingdom by-elections
