= Barnsley West and Penistone =

UK Parliament constituency (1983–2010)

Coordinates: 53.556°N 1.591°W

- Former county constituency for the House of Commons
- Boundary of Barnsley West and Penistone in South Yorkshire in 2005.

- Location of South Yorkshire within England.
- County: South Yorkshire
- Major settlements: Penistone

1983–2010
- Seats: One
- Created from: Barnsley and Penistone
- Replaced by: Barnsley Central, Penistone & Stocksbridge

Barnsley West and Penistone was a parliamentary constituency in South Yorkshire which returned one Member of Parliament (MP) to the House of Commons of the Parliament of the United Kingdom, elected by the first-past-the-post voting system.

== History ==
It was considered a safe seat for the Labour Party.

== Boundaries ==
The Metropolitan Borough of Barnsley wards of Darton, Dodworth, Hoyland East, Hoyland West, Park, Penistone East, Penistone West, and Worsbrough.

Barnsley West and Penistone constituency was created in 1983 when the former Barnsley constituency was split into three divisions. This seat also contained parts of the former Penistone constituency, which was abolished in the same boundary review: in total it covered the western part of the Borough of Barnsley and included the town of Penistone. It bordered the constituencies of Sheffield Hillsborough, Wentworth, Barnsley East and Mexborough, Barnsley Central, Hemsworth, Wakefield, Colne Valley, and High Peak. Penistone itself provides the highest Conservative vote in the Borough of Barnsley (although not always a majority - see for instance 1998 Barnsley Council election and 2008 Barnsley Council election), but the other small towns and villages, mostly former mining areas, are safely Labour.

=== Boundary review ===
Following the Boundary Commission for England's report on South Yorkshire's Parliamentary constituencies in 2004 and the subsequent inquiry in 2005 it was announced that the constituency of Barnsley West and Penistone would be abolished for future elections. The revisions split the constituency in two: the easternmost wards were to become part of a revised Barnsley Central constituency, while the westernmost wards, around Penistone, would be combined with the northern wards from the Sheffield Hillsborough constituency. This new constituency was to be named Penistone and Stocksbridge, and covers a similar area to the historic Penistone constituency.

== Members of Parliament ==
The constituency had two Members of Parliament over the course of its lifetime, both of whom were from the Labour Party or Labour Co-operative.

| Election | Member | Party |
|---|---|---|
| 1983 | Allen McKay | Labour |
| 1992 | Michael Clapham | Labour Co-operative |
| 2010 | constituency abolished: see Barnsley Central & Penistone and Stocksbridge | |

== Elections ==
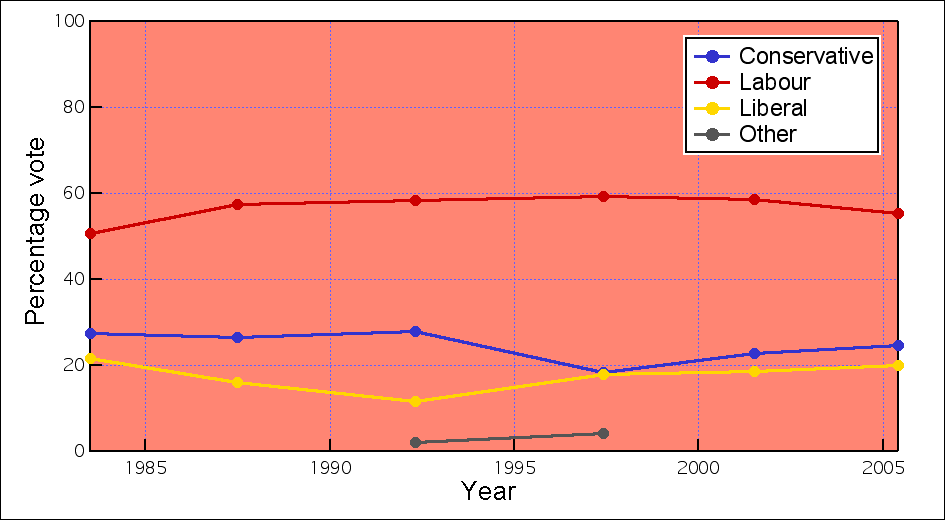
General election results since 1983

=== Elections in the 2000s ===
General election 2005: Barnsley West & Penistone
| Party | Candidate | Votes | % | ±% |
|---|---|---|---|---|
| Labour Co-op | Michael Clapham | 20,372 | 55.3 | −3.3 |
| Conservative | Clive Watkinson | 9,058 | 24.6 | +1.8 |
| Liberal Democrats | Alison Brelsford | 7,422 | 20.1 | +1.5 |
| Majority | | 11,314 | 30.7 | −5.1 |
| Turnout | | 36,842 | 55.0 | +2.1 |
| Labour Co-op hold | | Swing | −2.5 | |

General election 2001: Barnsley West & Penistone
| Party | Candidate | Votes | % | ±% |
|---|---|---|---|---|
| Labour Co-op | Michael Clapham | 20,244 | 58.6 | −0.7 |
| Conservative | William Rowe | 7,892 | 22.8 | +4.4 |
| Liberal Democrats | Miles Crompton | 6,428 | 18.6 | +0.6 |
| Majority | | 12,352 | 35.8 | −5.1 |
| Turnout | | 34,564 | 52.9 | −12.1 |
| Labour Co-op hold | | Swing | −2.6 | |

=== Elections in the 1990s ===
General election 1997: Barnsley West & Penistone
| Party | Candidate | Votes | % | ±% |
|---|---|---|---|---|
| Labour Co-op | Michael Clapham | 25,017 | 59.3 | +1.0 |
| Conservative | Paul Watkins | 7,750 | 18.4 | −9.6 |
| Liberal Democrats | Winifred Knight | 7,613 | 18.0 | +6.3 |
| Referendum | Joyce Miles | 1,828 | 4.3 | New |
| Majority | | 17,267 | 40.9 | +10.6 |
| Turnout | | 42,208 | 65.0 | −10.7 |
| Labour Co-op hold | | Swing | +5.3 | |

General election 1992: Barnsley West and Penistone
| Party | Candidate | Votes | % | ±% |
|---|---|---|---|---|
| Labour Co-op | Michael Clapham | 27,965 | 58.3 | +0.9 |
| Conservative | Graham Sawyer | 13,461 | 28.0 | +1.4 |
| Liberal Democrats | Hugh Nicolson | 5,610 | 11.7 | −4.3 |
| Green | Derek Jones | 970 | 2.0 | New |
| Majority | | 14,504 | 30.3 | −0.5 |
| Turnout | | 48,006 | 75.7 | 0.0 |
| Labour Co-op gain from Labour | | Swing | −0.2 | |

=== Elections in the 1980s ===
General election 1987: Barnsley West & Penistone
| Party | Candidate | Votes | % | ±% |
|---|---|---|---|---|
| Labour | Allen McKay | 26,498 | 57.4 | +6.6 |
| Conservative | Alan Duncan | 12,307 | 26.6 | −0.9 |
| SDP | Richard Hall | 7,409 | 16.0 | −5.7 |
| Majority | | 14,191 | 30.8 | +7.5 |
| Turnout | | 46,214 | 75.7 | +2.5 |
| Labour hold | | Swing | +3.7 | |

The first general election in this constituency was won by Allen McKay, who had been the MP for the abolished Penistone constituency since 1978.

General election 1983: Barnsley West & Penistone
| Party | Candidate | Votes | % | ±% |
|---|---|---|---|---|
| Labour | Allen McKay | 22,560 | 50.8 | |
| Conservative | Timothy Hartley | 12,218 | 27.5 | |
| SDP | John Evans | 9,624 | 21.7 | |
| Majority | | 10,342 | 23.3 | |
| Turnout | | 44,402 | 73.2 | |
| Labour win (new seat) | | | | |

== See also ==
- List of parliamentary constituencies in South Yorkshire

== Sources ==
- BBC Election 2005
- BBC Vote 2001
- Guardian Unlimited Politics (Election results from 1992 to the present)
- Richard Kimber's Political Science Resources (1983 and 1987 results)
