= Sydney Arnold, 1st Baron Arnold =

British politician (1878–1945)

Sydney Arnold, 1st Baron Arnold (13 January 1878 – 3 August 1945) was a radical British Liberal Party politician who later joined the Labour Party and served as a government minister.

A son of W. A. Arnold of Manchester, he was educated at Manchester Grammar School. As a member of the General Committee of the Manchester Liberal Federation, he served as Honorary Treasurer of the North-West Division of the Free Trade Union.

== Politics ==
He unsuccessfully contested the Conservative seat of Holderness Division of the East Riding of Yorkshire at the December 1910 General Election. He was elected in 1912 as Member of Parliament for Holmfirth in what was then the West Riding of Yorkshire at a by-election following the resignation of the long-serving Liberal MP Henry Wilson.

1912 Holmfirth by-election Electorate 13,035
Party	Candidate	Votes	%	±%
Liberal	Sydney Arnold	4,749	42.0	−15.5
Unionist	Geoffrey Ellis	3,379	29.8	+2.2
Labour	William Lunn	3,195	28.2	+13.3
Majority		1,370	12.2	−17.7
Turnout			86.9	
Liberal hold		Swing	-8.8	

In 1914, he was appointed Parliamentary Private Secretary to Jack Pease, the President of the Board of Education. He was also appointed Parliamentary Private Secretary to Edwin Samuel Montagu the Financial Secretary to the Treasury. During the war he served as a captain in the South Staffordshire Regiment.

When his constituency was abolished for the 1918 general election, he was elected for the new Penistone constituency against a Coalition Government endorsed Unionist candidate. He supported a levy on capital and the nationalisation of the mines and railways. He resigned that seat due to ill-health in 1921.

General election 1918: Penistone Electorate
Party	Candidate	Votes	%	±%
Liberal	Sydney Arnold	7,338	39.4	
Unionist	Phillip Gatty Smith	6,744	36.2	
Independent Labour	Frederick William Southern	4,556	24.4	
Majority		594	3.2	
Turnout			58.4	
Liberal win				

== Labour party ==
In 1922, he joined the Labour Party and was ennobled in 1924 as Baron Arnold, of Hale in the County of Chester, and served as Under-Secretary of State for the Colonies in Ramsay MacDonald's short-lived 1924 Labour Government, and as Paymaster General from 1929 to 6 March 1931 in Macdonald's second government.

In the late 1930s, he was a member of the Parliamentary Pacifist Group. He also served as a member of the council of the Anglo-German Fellowship. He resigned from the Labour Party, in 1938, on account of disagreement with its Foreign Policy.

Subsequently, his name was one of twenty-six attached to a letter printed in The Times supporting a policy of appeasement towards Germany. Because signatories included Barry Domvile and other leading members it was dubbed "The Link Letter" and its various signatories, including political moderates such as Arnold, William Harbutt Dawson, Smedley Crooke and Lord Londonderry, came under suspicion as far right supporters. (Note: The twenty-six signatories were: Captain Bernard Acworth; Lord Arnold; Sir Raymond Beazley; C. E. Carroll; John Smedley Crooke; William Harbutt Dawson; Admiral Sir Barry Domvile; A. E. R. Dyer; Lord Fairfax of Cameron; Lord Hardinge of Penshurst; Admiral Sir Edward Inglefield; F. C. Jarvis; Douglas Jerrold; Sir John Latta; A. P. Laurie; Lord Londonderry; Admiral Vincent Molteno; Lord Mount Temple; Admiral Wilmot Nicholson; Captain George Pitt-Rivers; Captain Archibald Ramsay; Lord Redesdale; Captain Arthur Rogers; Major-General Arthur Solly-Flood; Mrs Nesta Webster; Bernard Wilson.)

== Arms ==
Coat of arms of Sydney Arnold, 1st Baron Arnold
Crest In front of an Eagle's Head erased per chevron Gules and Or two Pheons fesswise Sable Escutcheon Per chevron Azure and Or in chief two Garbs and in base a Pheon counterchanged Supporters Dexter: A Lion proper; Sinister: A Wolf also proper, each charged on the shoulder with a Pheon Or Motto Laborare et orare (To work is to pray)

== Notes ==
Parliament of the United Kingdom
Preceded by Henry Wilson	Member of Parliament for Holmfirth; 1912–1918	Constituency abolished
New constituency	Member of Parliament for Penistone; 1918–1921	Succeeded by William Gillis
Political offices
Preceded by William Ormsby-Gore	Under-Secretary of State for the Colonies; 1924	Succeeded by William Ormsby-Gore
Preceded by The Earl of Onslow	Paymaster General; 1929–1931	Vacant Title next held by Tudor Walters
Peerage of the United Kingdom
New creation	Baron Arnold; 1924–1945	Extinct
