= Henry Wilson (Holmfirth MP) =

British politician (1833–1914)

Henry Wilson

Henry Joseph Wilson (14 April 1833 – 29 June 1914) was a British farmer, industrialist and Liberal Party politician.

== Family and education ==
Henry Joseph Wilson was born at Old Radford, Nottinghamshire, the son of William Wilson who had also lived at Torquay and Mansfield. The Wilson family held strong Nonconformist and Reform sympathies. His half sister was Sarah Poulton Kalley who was a missionary in Brazil. Henry was educated at the West of England Dissenters’ Proprietary School, Taunton and then at University College London. In 1859, he married Charlotte, daughter of Charles Cowan the MP, for Edinburgh. They had three sons and two daughters. One of his sons, Cecil Henry Wilson, was later a Labour Party politician and sat as MP for the constituency of Sheffield Attercliffe. His daughter Helen Mary Wilson was a physician and social campaigner, and first woman magistrate in Sheffield.

== Career ==
Wilson began working life as a farmer near Mansfield and in 1867, after fourteen years as tenant of Newlands Farm, he went to Sheffield to manage the family firm, the Sheffield Smelting Company of which he also became a director.

== Politics ==
=== Radical causes ===
Wilson's political interests were born of the radical and dissenting tradition he inherited from his father and the Wilson family's Victorian dedication to public service and devotion to civic duty. His causes included the temperance movement, opposition to the state regulation of vice, non-sectarian education, Disestablishment of the Anglican Church, Irish Home Rule, internationalism, Anti-imperialism and the destruction of the Opium trade. Wilson's radicalism led him away from the traditional Gladstonian Liberalism of the age, as represented by the dominant group within the party in Sheffield. He was particularly repelled by some of the provisions of the Elementary Education Act 1870 such as those which involved payment for religious teaching out of public funds. Nonconformists saw the act as a violation of religious liberty in education.

=== Sheffield Reform Association ===
In March 1873, Wilson and his supporters formed a rival political organisation, the Sheffield Reform Association with the aim of promoting a more radical Liberal voice in the city and in the hope of getting a candidate sympathetic to these progressive causes elected to Parliament. This campaign seemed to about the bear fruit just before the 1874 general election. Impressed with the radical tone he was hearing from the newly elected Mayor of Birmingham Joseph Chamberlain, Wilson invited Chamberlain to try his luck as a candidate in Sheffield. But the election was a shambles from a Liberal perspective as four men were nominated for the two seats to be contested. Chamberlain came third after a bitter campaign in which dead cats were thrown at him on the hustings.

=== Liberal MP ===
Perhaps the divisions of 1874 opened Wilson's eyes to the need for Liberal unity, perhaps made easier by the resignation of Mr Gladstone from the leadership of the Party in 1875. In that year Wilson became Secretary of the Sheffield Liberal Association, a new body formed to make Sheffield secure against possible Unionist intervention and to try to give the radical activists a better chance of success in electing someone like Chamberlain in the future. From this more mainstream base, Wilson was selected to stand as Liberal candidate for Holmfirth in the West Riding of Yorkshire at the 1885 general election. Amongst his rivals for the nomination was former Liberal MP Frederick Beaumont . He won the Holmfirth seat with 6% of the poll and then held it against all-comers at each subsequent election until he resigned in 1912. His successor at the subsequent by-election was Sydney Arnold.

== Offices and appointments ==
Wilson held offices in many organisations connected with his local and national political activities. He was Secretary of the Northern Counties Electoral League for the Repeal of the Contagious Diseases Acts from 1872 to 1885 and of the British Continental and General Federation for the Abolition of Government Regulation of Prostitution, from 1875. He was a member of the Royal Commission on Opium in India from 1893–95, Treasurer of the National Vigilance Association in the 1900s, a Justice of the Peace from 1881, and was for fifteen years a member of the Sheffield School Board. He served on the Sheffield Nonconformist Committee, set up to work for the amendment of the Education Act of 1870, from 1872 to the Committee's effective dissolution in 1877. In 1910 he gave £10,000 towards the purchase of a public garden in the east end of Sheffield.

== Archives ==
Papers of Henry Wilson are held at The Women's Library at the Library of the London School of Economics, see the online catalogue here 3HJW. There is also a collection of material at the Sheffield City Archive.

Parliament of the United Kingdom
New constituency	Member of Parliament for Holmfirth; 1885–1912	Succeeded by Sydney Arnold
