= Friends of Ireland (UK) =

The Friends of Ireland was a group of British Labour Party Members of Parliament in support of the ending of the partition of Ireland.

The group was founded in 1945 by Hugh Delargy. Delargy became its secretary, while Henry McGhee and Richard Stokes were appointed as joint treasurers. Delargy immediately wrote to Anthony Mulvey of the new Anti-Partition League of Ireland (APL), stating that he intended for the two groups to work together. However, the two groups had some differing views; the Friends of Ireland were also happy to work with the Northern Ireland Labour Party and believed that the ultimate answer to the social problems of Catholics in Northern Ireland was socialism, while the Anti-Partition League accused the British Labour government of having "Tory attitudes" and saw the reunification as the ultimate answer.

Other active members of the Friends included Geoffrey Bing, William Foster, John Haire, Valentine McEntee and H. B. Morgan. Membership totalled 30 in 1945, and 120 in 1948, but most of the membership was purely nominal.

In the British House of Commons, the group attempted to raise concerns about social conditions and the freedom of opposition groups to meet and campaign in Northern Ireland, but these were usually ruled out of order by the Speaker. The debate on the Northern Ireland Act 1947, was the best opportunity for this, and Delargy and Anthony Mulvey of the Nationalist Party, while not opposing the Act, co-operated in raising objections about the Government of Northern Ireland. However, the Ireland Act 1949 marked a split between the Friends and the APL, with leading members of the friends criticising the Government of Ireland declaration of a republic.

The APL decided to stand candidates against Labour in areas with large Irish populations at the 1950 general election, and Delargy dissociated himself from the APL, with the Friends then disintegrating.
