= Miriam Cates =

British politician (born 1982)

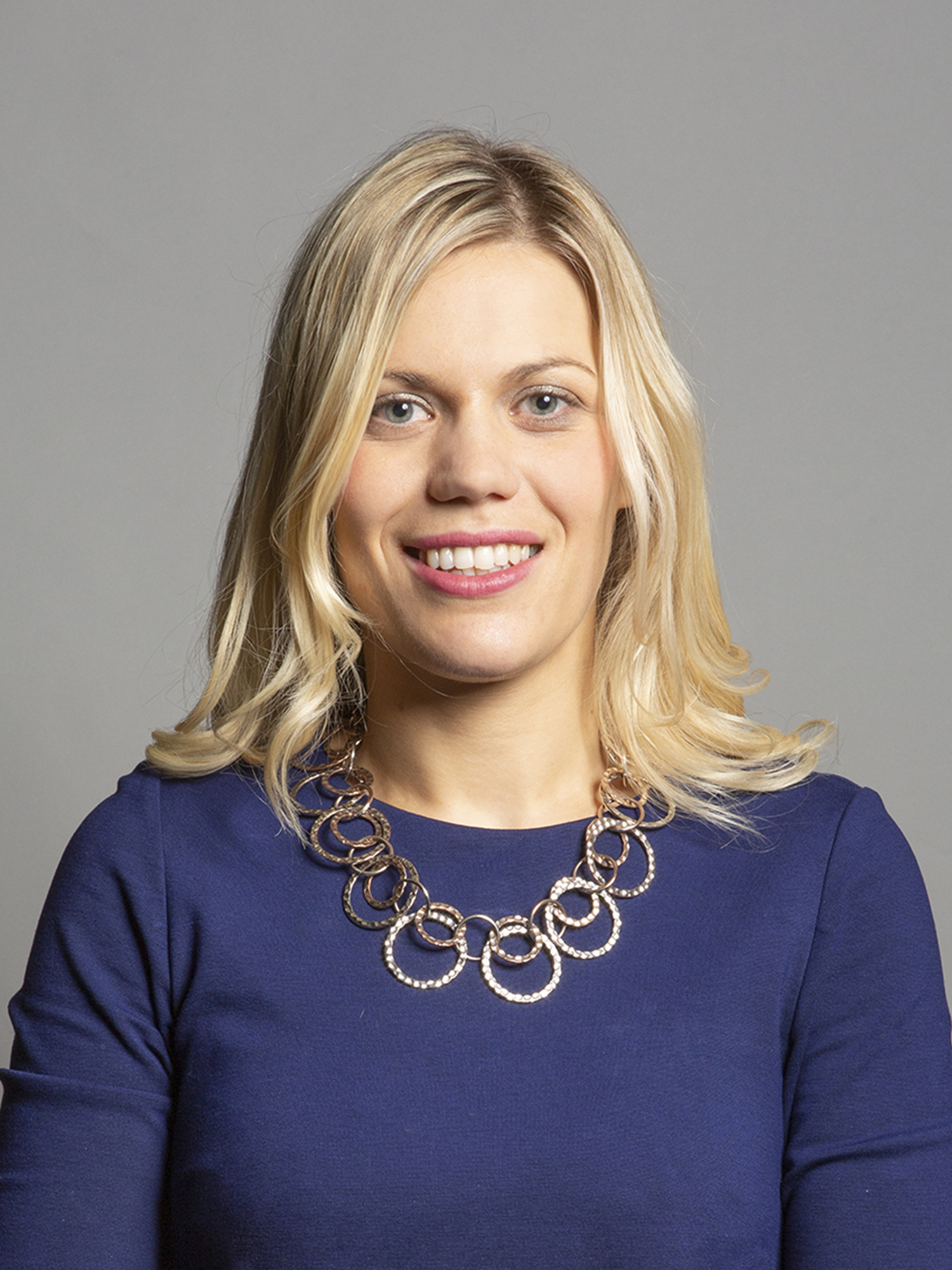
- Official portrait, 2019

Member of Parliament for Penistone and Stocksbridge
- In office 12 December 2019 – 30 May 2024
- Preceded by: Angela Smith
- Succeeded by: Marie Tidball

Personal details
- Born: Miriam Joy Atkins; 23 August 1982 (age 43) Sheffield, South Yorkshire, England
- Party: Conservative (since 2018)
- Other political affiliations: Labour (1997)
- Spouse: David Cates
- Children: 3
- Education: Christ's College, Cambridge
- Profession: Politician, businesswoman, teacher
- Website: miriamcates.org.uk

Miriam Joy Cates (born 23 August 1982) is a British television host and former politician who was the Conservative Member of Parliament (MP) for Penistone and Stocksbridge from 2019 to 2024.

== Early life and education ==
Miriam Cates was born on 23 August 1982 in Sheffield, South Yorkshire. She grew up in a Christian family and has two younger brothers. Her father was a general practitioner, while her mother, who had a maths degree, was a stay at home mum. Although her parents had no particular interest in politics, Cates was drawn to the field at an early age, including listening to the Today programme on the radio from the age of 11. Her keen interest in politics led her to also become a young fan of The Westminster Hour.

Whilst at primary school, she was "raised with rhymes about how much people hated Margaret Thatcher." She then attended a comprehensive school, where she was a straight-A student. She reports that the "Leftist" ethic of her school turned her towards conservative ideas. Initially, she intended to become a concert pianist.

Cates went on to study Natural Sciences at Christ's College, Cambridge, where she earned a degree in genetics. She went on to obtain a Postgraduate Certificate in Education from Sheffield Hallam University, and worked as a biology teacher at Tapton School in Sheffield.

== Political career ==
=== Parish councillor ===
In an interview, Cates described moving to the village of Oughtibridge, joining the local Parent–Teacher Association and organising nights for mothers and the playgroup at her local church. Speaking on a podcast in 2021, Cates said of that time: "I got a sense of what you could achieve if you're passionate about your community". Cates was elected in 2015 as a parish councillor for Oughtibridge Ward on Bradfield Parish Council, which, at one point involved her campaigning to save local parkland. She was re-elected in 2019 and resigned her seat in 2021.

Cates stood as a Conservative candidate for Stannington ward in the 2018 Sheffield City Council election and joined the party in the same year, finishing third behind the Liberal Democrats candidates.

=== Member of Parliament ===
Cates described a family friend asking her to stand as a Conservative candidate for Penistone & Stocksbridge in October 2018. Though unsuccessful in her bid, she found she enjoyed campaigning, and decided to go to the next Conservative party conference.

At that conference, in 2019, Cates met Anne Jenkin, who was recruiting for women candidates, and identified a seat near her home. Cates was subsequently selected, and campaigned to be the MP for Penistone and Stocksbridge in the 2019 general election. The seat was targeted as part of Boris Johnson's red wall strategy, with Cates and Johnson appearing together in the local campaign.

Cates won the seat, with a majority of 7,210 (14.5%) on a swing of 8.6% from Labour to the Conservatives. As such, Cates became the first Conservative MP in South Yorkshire since 1992.

After her election, it was reported that a mobile app for food banks, developed by a company co-owned by Cates and her husband, was charging charities for its services. Initially the app charged food banks a £360 subscription fee for two years, however after the Conservative Party was approached by the press the pricing structure was changed to a one-off set-up fee of £180.

Media accused her of breaking Covid rules by attending an event in December 2020, though a later inquiry was "satisfied on the balance of probabilities that the event included both business and social elements".

Once in Parliament, Cates served as a member of the Ecclesiastical Committee and the Education Select Committee. In the latter role, she submitted a report to the Prime Minister presenting evidence that many schools routinely misapply equality law "in favour of gender ideology." In its place, Cates argued for a more strongly pro-parent outlook from Britain's schools.

Cates also co-chaired a local advancement initiative, the Stocksbridge Towns Fund, with local property developer Mark Dransfield. Alongside national-conservative figure Danny Kruger, Cates was elected to the Executive of the 1922 Committee on 11 July 2022.

Halfway through her term, Boris Johnson resigned from the leadership, and Cates participated in the July-September 2022 Conservative Party leadership election During the contest, Cates endorsed Suella Braverman; the leadership election was ultimately won by Liz Truss, who resigned less than two months later to be succeeded by Rishi Sunak.

During Braverman's tenure as home secretary, Cates supported Braverman when she was criticised. When Braveman accused London's Metropolitan Police of being more lenient with pro-Palestine protesters than supporters of Israel, Cates argued: "Suella Braverman's views may be distasteful to Westminster liberals but they're utterly mainstream in the rest of UK."

She spoke up on topical issues affecting families, such as protecting the rights of women and girls, including single-sex spaces; and led a debate on banning mobile phones in schools.

At the 2024 general election, Cates lost her seat to the Labour candidate Marie Tidball. Compared to her 2019 performance, she lost a significant share of the vote to Labour and the right-wing populist Reform UK.

In an opinion piece about the election, Cates wrote, "Reader, we blew it." Offering that her party was "staring into the abyss" because it had failed, or forgotten, voters in post-industrial towns who wanted economic regeneration, patriotism, cultural security family, neighbourhood and nation.

== Political views ==
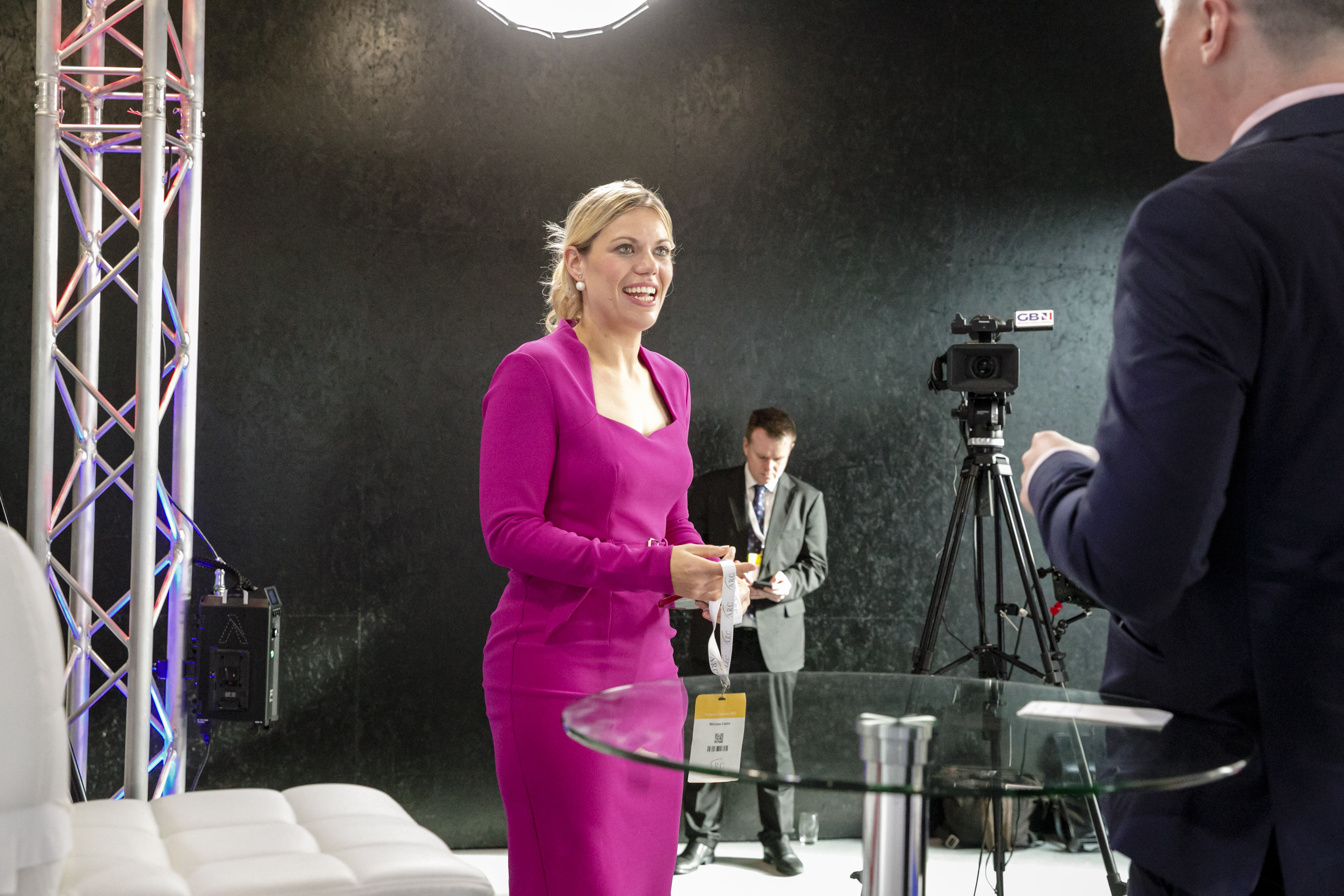
Miriam Cates in an interview in 2023

Cates was described as a "radical traditionalist" who felt that conservatism has become unnecessarily embittered, and that there is "too much whinging on the right". Cates established the New Social Covenant Unit with fellow Conservative MP Danny Kruger in 2021 with the principal purpose of promoting policy that would "strengthen families, communities, and the nation".

=== Brexit ===
Before entering Parliament, Cates had supported the UK remaining a member of the European Union in the 2016 referendum but, during the election campaign, said she had since changed her mind and supported Brexit.

=== Pro-natalism ===
Cates argued for families to be able to have more children, and for societies that value children. She regards the very low number of children being born as the highest political concern for the UK. In a plenary session of the 2023 National Conservatism Conference, Cates was quoted saying:

"I don't care if you're a Red Tory, a communitarian, a follower of Burke, or, heaven forbid, a libertarian free marketeer. None of these traditions has a future, none of our philosophical musings or policy proposals will amount to anything long-lasting unless we address the one overarching threat to British conservatism, and indeed the whole of Western society. No, it's not climate change. It's not Russia or China or Iran. It's not the neo-Marxist ideology that has so weakened our institutions. It's not inflation or taxation or poor productivity. No. There is one critical outcome that liberal individualism has completely failed to deliver and that is babies."

During the COVID-19 pandemic Cates argued the policy emphasis should have been on "the long-term impact of lockdowns on young people's lives." In a speech at the Alliance for Responsible Citizenship's inaugural conference, she criticised the way "our GDP-obsessed economic system demands that even mothers of small children leave their infants in daycare to return to the workplace."

=== Conversion therapy ===
Cates has claimed that she does not support, and never has supported, conversion therapy; however, she has voted against some versions of legislation that oppose it.

=== National conservatism ===
Cates served on the advisory board of the Alliance for Responsible Citizenship, a group dedicated to cultural renewal in western nations. In May 2023, at the National Conservatism Conference, Cates commented that she felt that Western society was threatened by Cultural Marxism and referenced the Great Replacement conspiracy theory by stating that falling birth rates are "the one overarching threat to British conservatism and indeed the whole of western society". Cates later stated in an interview in June 2023 that she uses the term as a catch-all pseudonym for "bad liberal ideology".

In August 2023, Cates called for the UK to leave the European Convention on Human Rights if the Supreme Court finds the Rwanda policy incompatible with European law. Cates argues that UK equalities legislation has become a threat to freedoms of speech, expression, religion, and association and that the UK's common law heritage provides a strong human rights record, even without the ECHR. Cates argued for the nation to be resolved to use the power of the state to address the needs of voters who feel ignored and disrespected whilst also aiming to keep faith with Brexit voters. She said that,

Some people on the left have a moral problem with saying we should favour our own. But you favour your own children. Of course you do, because you and you alone are that child's parent; who else will take care of them? It's exactly the same – whether it's immigration or foreign students coming here. If we don't favour our own country no one else will. So that is our first duty.

=== Gender-critical views ===
Cates has expressed gender-critical views by arguing for the importance of biological sex, "by saying that trans women are women, or by denying the importance of biological sex." She warned that trans advocating charities Stonewall and Mermaids taught "dangerous and contested extreme ideologies that don't have a basis in science". In one speech, she offered anecdotal observation that, for some men, "trans porn that led them into the trans arena."

On 30 June 2022, during a debate surrounding relationship and sex education in the UK, Cates claimed that knowing about transgender identities could be damaging to children. She shared a story from Bayswater Support Group, of a 15-year-old child with Asperger syndrome who began identifying as transgender. Their mother was unsupportive, but the school supported the child's new gender identity. Cates referenced the group name, stating that Bayswater had reported a surge of parents contacting them after their children learnt about transgender people at school.

The Bureau of Investigative Journalism approached Cates, asking for comment on her connection to Bayswater Support Group, after their investigation found that the group members encouraged sending their children to conversion therapy, and destroying their children's belongings. A spokesperson for Cates claimed the investigation included factual errors, and was "contrary to publicly available evidence". The spokesperson refused to provide any further specific comments, and threatened The Bureau of Investigative Journalism with legal action.

== Post-politics ==
After losing her seat in Parliament, Cates announced she would be taking roles in media and research. She was revealed as a stand-in presenter for GB News in late July 2024. She continues to write on themes of politics and culture, contributing to UnHerd, The Critic and The Telegraph.

== Personal life ==
Cates lives in Oughtibridge, a village near Stocksbridge in South Yorkshire, with her husband Dave and three children. She is an evangelical Christian and met her husband while working on a voluntary project at their church, the Network Church in Sheffield, on a gap year after her Cambridge studies.

She and her husband founded and own together a software company, Redemption Media. He is the managing director and she is the finance director, and there are no further employees; the company was valued at £5,000 in 2023.

Her husband is also the chairman of the trust board overseeing the Peak Edge Academy Trust.

Parliament of the United Kingdom
Preceded by Angela Smith	Member of Parliament for Penistone and Stocksbridge; 2019–2024	Succeeded by Marie Tidball
