= Holmfirth (constituency) =

Parliamentary constituency in the United Kingdom, 1885–1918

- Former borough constituency for the House of Commons

1885–1918
- Seats: one
- Created from: Southern West Riding of Yorkshire
- Replaced by: Colne Valley and Penistone

Holmfirth was a parliamentary constituency centred on the town of Holmfirth in the West Riding of Yorkshire. It returned one Member of Parliament (MP) to the House of Commons of the Parliament of the United Kingdom, elected by the first past the post system.

== History ==
The constituency was created by the Redistribution of Seats Act 1885 for the 1885 general election, and abolished for the 1918 general election.

== Boundaries ==
Parts of the Sessional Divisions of Staincross and Upper Aggbrigg.

== Members of Parliament ==
Election	Member	Party
1885	Henry Wilson	Liberal
1912	Sydney Arnold	Liberal
1918	constituency abolished	

== Elections ==
=== Elections in the 1880s ===
Henry Wilson

General election 1885: Holmfirth
Party	Candidate	Votes	%	±%
Liberal	Henry Wilson	6,208	66.2	
Conservative	Heneage Legge	3,164	33.8	
Majority		3,044	32.4	
Turnout		9,372	87.0	
Registered electors		10,770		
Liberal win (new seat)				

General election 1886: Holmfirth
Party	Candidate	Votes	%	±%
Liberal	Henry Wilson	5,322	65.7	−0.5
Liberal Unionist	Walter Armitage	2,780	34.3	+0.5
Majority		2,542	31.4	−1.0
Turnout		8,102	75.2	−11.8
Registered electors		10,770		
Liberal hold		Swing	−0.5	

=== Elections in the 1890s ===
General election 1892: Holmfirth
Party	Candidate	Votes	%	±%
Liberal	Henry Wilson	5,640	63.0	−2.7
Conservative	Harold Thomas	3,317	37.0	+2.7
Majority		2,323	26.0	−5.4
Turnout		8,957	73.4	−1.8
Registered electors		12,197		
Liberal hold		Swing	−2.7	

General election 1895: Holmfirth
Party	Candidate	Votes	%	±%
Liberal	Henry Wilson	5,001	59.1	−3.9
Conservative	George Edward Raine	3,459	40.9	+3.9
Majority		1,542	18.2	−7.8
Turnout		8,460	76.2	+2.8
Registered electors		11,103		
Liberal hold		Swing	−3.9	

=== Elections in the 1900s ===
General election 1900: Holmfirth
Party	Candidate	Votes	%	±%
Liberal	Henry Wilson	4,505	54.7	−4.4
Conservative	Edward Montagu-Stuart-Wortley	3,738	45.3	+4.4
Majority		767	9.4	−8.8
Turnout		8,243	73.4	−2.8
Registered electors		11,223		
Liberal hold		Swing	−4.4	

General election 1906: Holmfirth
Party	Candidate	Votes	%	±%
Liberal	Henry Wilson	6,850	71.9	+17.2
Conservative	SG Jebb	2,677	28.1	−17.2
Majority		4,173	43.8	+34.4
Turnout		9,527	78.0	+4.6
Registered electors		12,219		
Liberal hold		Swing	+17.2	

=== Elections in the 1910s ===
General election January 1910: Holmfirth
Party	Candidate	Votes	%	±%
Liberal	Henry Wilson	6,339	57.5	−14.4
Liberal Unionist	Robert Ellis	3,043	27.6	−0.5
Labour	William Pickles	1,643	14.9	New
Majority		3,296	29.9	−13.9
Turnout		11,025	86.2	+8.2
Registered electors		12,788		
Liberal hold		Swing	−7.0	

General election December 1910: Holmfirth
Party	Candidate	Votes	%	±%
Liberal	Henry Wilson	Unopposed		
Liberal hold				

Sydney Arnold

1912 Holmfirth by-election
Party	Candidate	Votes	%	±%
Liberal	Sydney Arnold	4,749	42.0	N/A
Unionist	Robert Ellis	3,379	29.8	New
Labour	William Lunn	3,195	28.2	New
Majority		1,370	12.2	N/A
Turnout		11,323	86.9	N/A
Registered electors		13,035		
Liberal hold		Swing	N/A	

General Election 1914–15:

A general election was due to take place by the end of 1915. By the autumn of 1914, the following candidates had been adopted to contest that election. Due to the outbreak of war, the election never took place.

- Liberal: Sydney Arnold
- Labour: William Lunn
