= Marie Tidball =

British academic and politician

Marie Tidball MP
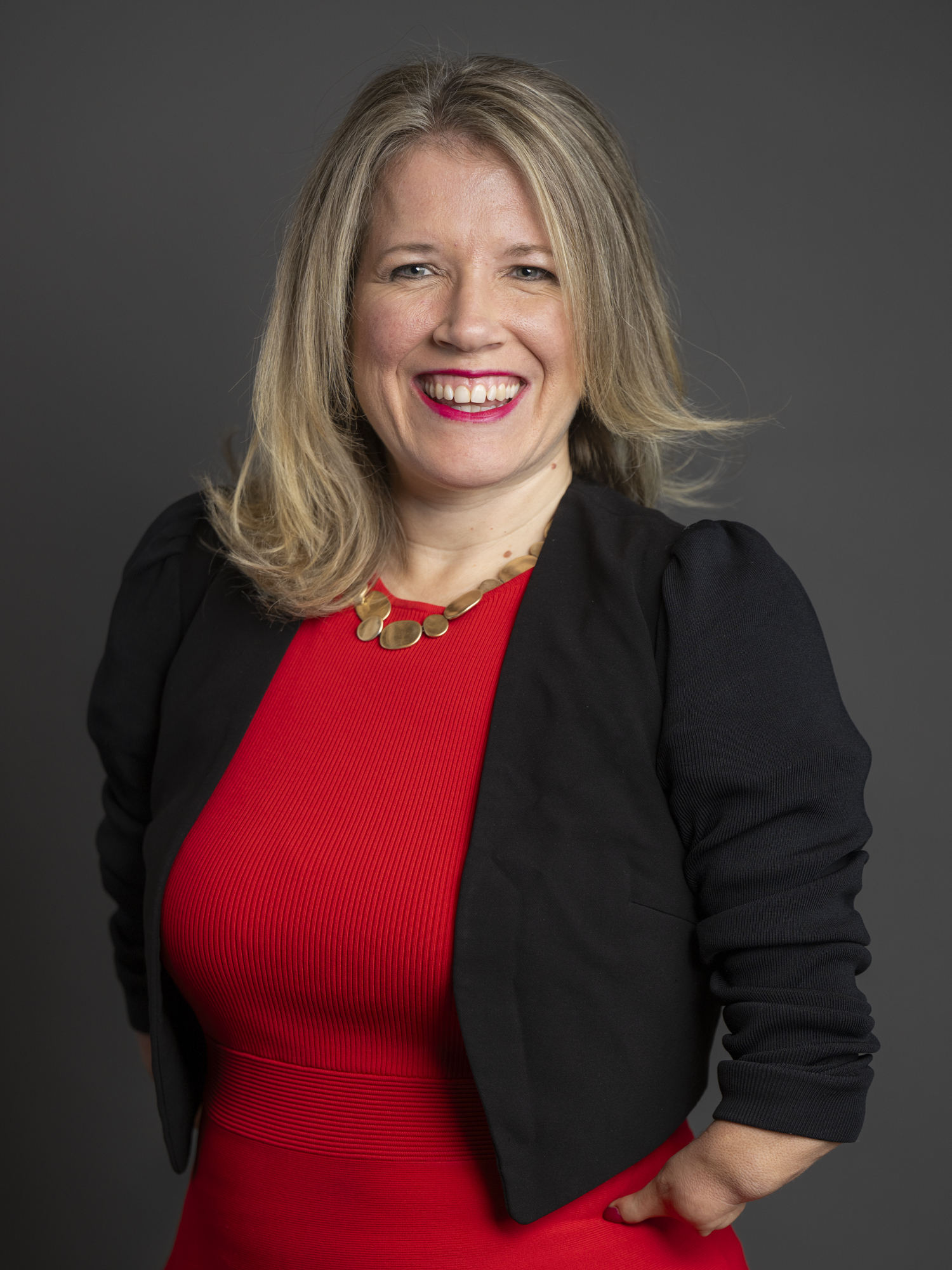
- Official portrait, 2024

Member of Parliament for Penistone and Stocksbridge
- Incumbent
- Assumed office 4 July 2024
- Preceded by: Miriam Cates
- Majority: 8,739 (19.9%)

Personal details
- Party: Labour
- Education: Penistone Grammar School
- Alma mater: Wadham College, Oxford
- Profession: Politician
- Website: https://www.marietidball.com/

Marie Tidball is a British Labour politician and disability rights campaigner, who has been the Member of Parliament for Penistone and Stocksbridge since 2024.

== Early life ==
Marie Tidball was born with a congenital disability which affects all four limbs, with foreshortened arms and legs and a digit on each underdeveloped hand. As a child she missed three years of school because of the surgery needed.

She grew up in Penistone and Stocksbridge, and was educated at Penistone Grammar School, by then a non-selective state school. Her mother was a nursery head and her father was a teacher and Labour county councillor, who helped found Barnsley College.

== Education and early career ==
Tidball studied law at Wadham College, Oxford, followed by a journalism internship at Channel 4 News. She returned to Oxford to do a Master of Science (MSc) degree in criminology and criminal justice. Her MSc dissertation was titled Mad, Bad or Disabled?. She then worked as policy and legal officer for Autism West Midlands in Birmingham.

She was a founding director and coordinator of the Oxford University disability law and policy project. She was awarded a Doctor of Philosophy (DPhil) degree in 2017: her doctoral thesis was titled "The governance of adult defendants with autism through English criminal justice policy and criminal court practice" and her doctoral supervisor was Carolyn Hoyle.

== Oxford councillor ==
Tidball has been called one of the country's leading disability rights campaigners by the Barnsley Chronicle. From 2016 to 2022 she was a Labour councillor for Oxford City Council. In the 2017 election she stood for parliament in the Oxford West and Abingdon constituency, finishing third.

== Parliamentary career ==
In June 2022, Tidball was selected to stand as the Labour candidate for the 2024 election, with the backing of multiple trade unions, as well as Dan Jarvis, Stephanie Peacock and David Blunkett. In July 2024, she was elected as the Member of Parliament (MP) for Penistone and Stocksbridge.

=== 2024 ===
In September 2024, Tidball unsuccessfully stood for election as chair of the House of Commons Education Select Committee. She argued that newly-elected MPs should not be overlooked for senior parliamentary roles, and cited her experience of disability and education policy in support of the candidacy. She subsequently served as a member of the Education Committee from October 2024 to October 2025. Tidball also served on the public bill committee considering the Employment Rights Bill between November 2024 and January 2025.

Tidball supported Kim Leadbeater's Terminally Ill Adults (End of Life) Bill at its second reading in 2024, while arguing that the legislation required stronger safeguards. She was appointed to the public bill committee examining the legislation, serving from January to March 2025 and participating in debates on safeguards including access to palliative care and protections for marginalised groups. The bill later passed the House of Commons but did not complete its passage through the House of Lords before the end of the 2024–26 parliamentary session.

=== 2025 ===
In January 2025, Tidball led a Westminster Hall debate on the statutory presumption of parental involvement in child arrangement cases. She called for reform of the presumption, working with her constituent Claire Throssell, whose sons Jack and Paul were killed by their father during court-authorised contact. In October 2025, the government announced that it would repeal the presumption of parental involvement from the Children Act 1989. The repeal was subsequently included in the Courts and Tribunals Bill. During evidence to the bill committee in March 2026, Justice Minister Sarah Sackman referred to the Westminster Hall debate called by Tidball and to Throssell's evidence when discussing the proposed repeal.

In March 2025, Tidball began campaigning for changes to maternity care for disabled women, drawing on her own experiences of pregnancy and childbirth. She called for specialist advice, accessible equipment and facilities, and improved guidance for healthcare professionals. The campaign was subsequently developed under the name MaternAble, with the stated aim of improving the safety and accessibility of maternity care for disabled women. In 2026, MaternAble contributed evidence to the independent National Maternity and Neonatal Investigation. Tidball was also appointed to the Parliamentary and Mayoral Group supporting the government's National Maternity and Neonatal Taskforce.

In June 2025, Tidball criticised proposed government changes to disability benefits, including changes to Personal Independence Payment (PIP). She argued that reforms should be developed through consultation and co-production with disabled people and said in June that she could not support the government's initial proposals. On 1 July, she voted against the Universal Credit and Personal Independence Payment Bill at its second reading. During the bill's later stages she proposed provisions intended to require the PIP review led by Stephen Timms to be co-produced with disabled people, including through a taskforce with a majority of disabled members or representatives of disabled people's organisations. The government subsequently accepted several proposals associated with Tidball, including commitments relating to consultation, co-production and targets for reducing the disability employment gap.

In September 2025, Tidball was appointed a Parliamentary Private Secretary (PPS) to the Department for Business and Trade, having previously served on the committee examining the Employment Rights Bill. The department was renamed the Department for Business, Innovation, Science and Trade as part of machinery-of-government changes in July 2026.

In November 2025, Tidball was named Parliamentarian of the Year at The Spectator's annual Parliamentarian of the Year Awards.

=== 2026 ===
In March 2026, Tidball spoke in a House of Commons debate marking International Women's Day about her experiences of anorexia as a teenager following the amputation of her leg. She discussed the relationship between disability, body image and eating disorders, and called for greater recognition of disabled women's experiences in education and healthcare.

Tidball continued to campaign alongside her constituent Claire Throssell for the repeal of the statutory presumption of parental involvement in family court proceedings, following the deaths of Throssell's sons Jack and Paul in 2014 during court-ordered contact with their father. The proposed reform, known as Jack and Paul's Law, was included in the government's Courts and Tribunals Bill. Tidball spoke in support of the provision during the bill's report stage on 13 October 2026, before the legislation passed its third reading in the House of Commons by 301 votes to 193. The bill subsequently progressed to the House of Lords.

In June 2026, Tidball was appointed to the Parliamentary and Mayoral Group supporting the government's National Maternity and Neonatal Taskforce. Her appointment followed her campaigning for improved maternity care for disabled women through MaternAble, which contributed evidence to the independent National Maternity and Neonatal Investigation chaired by Baroness Amos. Following publication of the investigation's findings, Tidball called for disabled women's experiences to inform the government's response and the development of national maternity policy.

Tidball co-sponsored the reintroduction of the Terminally Ill Adults (End of Life) Bill by Lauren Edwards MP in June 2026, following the failure of Kim Leadbeater's earlier bill to complete its parliamentary stages. She spoke and voted in favour of the legislation at its second reading on 11 September 2026, when it was defeated by 286 votes to 270.

In September 2026, Tidball welcomed the government's announcement that it would work towards acquiring Speciality Steel UK, which operated steelworks in Stocksbridge and Rotherham. She called for the restoration of steelmaking operations across the company's South Yorkshire sites and continued to advocate for the protection of local steel industry employment.

During 2026, Tidball also supported campaigns to preserve local community assets, including efforts to prevent the sale of the former Scout Dike Activity Centre for housing development and a petition opposing Barnsley Council's decision to cancel a planned £1.8 million redevelopment of Penistone Paramount. The latter petition attracted more than 5,000 signatures.

In November 2026, Tidball called for a pause to the Sheffield Local Plan, raising concerns about proposed housing development on green belt agricultural land in her constituency. Housing minister Matthew Pennycook declined her request for a meeting about the plan, stating that decisions about its progression were a matter for independent planning inspectors.

== Personal life ==
She has a daughter, and has lobbied for better maternity care and assistance for disabled mothers.

== Selected works ==
- Tidball, Marie (2024). Disabling criminal justice: the governance of autistic adult defendants in the English criminal justice system. Oxford; New York: Hart Publishing. ISBN 9781509956968.

Parliament of the United Kingdom
| Preceded by Miriam Cates | Member of Parliament for Penistone and Stocksbridge; 2024–present | Incumbent |
