= Allen McKay =

British politician

Member of Parliament for Barnsley West and Penistone
- In office 1983–1992

Member of Parliament for Penistone
- In office 1978–1983

Personal details
- Born: 5 February 1927 Barnsley, West Riding of Yorkshire, England
- Died: 2 May 2013 (aged 86)
- Political party: Labour

Allen McKay (5 February 1927 – 2 May 2013) was a British Labour Party politician.

== Biography ==
Born in Barnsley, McKay was elected Member of Parliament (MP) for the South Yorkshire constituency of Penistone in a 1978 by-election following the death of the Labour MP John Mendelson, serving there until the seat was abolished for the 1983 general election. He was then elected as MP for Barnsley West and Penistone, and held that seat until he retired at the 1992 general election.

== Sources ==
- Times Guide to the House of Commons, 1987

Parliament of the United Kingdom
Preceded by John Mendelson	Member of Parliament for Penistone; 1978–1983	Constituency abolished
New constituency	Member of Parliament for Barnsley West and Penistone; 1983–1992	Succeeded by Michael Clapham
