= Clifford Glossop =

British politician

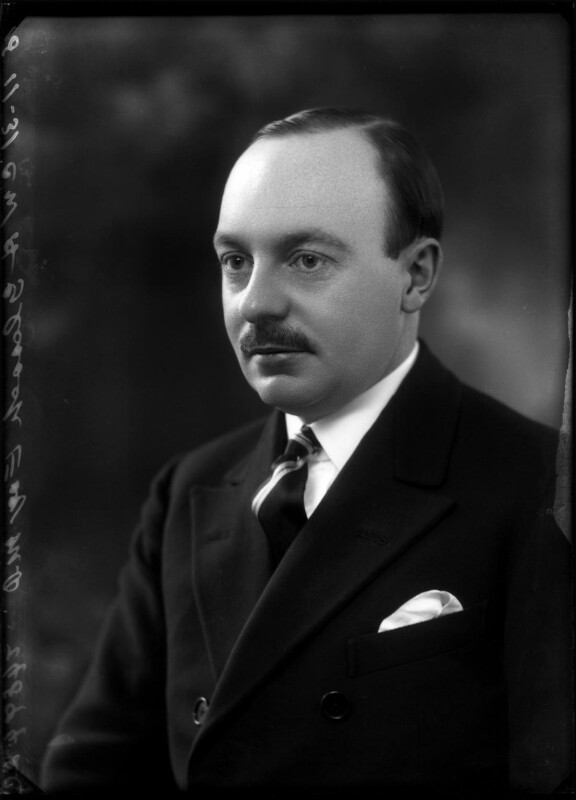
Glossop in 1931

Clifford William Hudson Glossop (30 June 1901 – 4 July 1975), the son of William Glossop and his wife, Ida Muriel Hudson, was educated at Stanmore Park School and Harrow School.

He was a Conservative Party politician in the United Kingdom who served as a member of parliament (MP) from 1931 to 1935 and from 1945 to 1947.

At the 1931 general election he was elected as member of parliament for Penistone in Yorkshire, defeating the sitting Labour MP as Labour's vote collapsed following the party's split over Prime Minister Ramsay MacDonald's formation of a National Government. Labour regained the Penistone seat at the 1935 general election.

Glossop was returned to the House of Commons at the 1945 general election as MP for the Howdenshire constituency in East Yorkshire, and held the seat until his resignation in 1947.

He retired to live in Natal, South Africa, and died there. He was buried in the Byrne Settler Cemetery, Richmond District, Natal.

== Sources ==
- Craig, F. W. S. (1983) [1969]. British parliamentary election results 1918-1949 (3rd ed.). Chichester: Parliamentary Research Services. ISBN 0-900178-06-X.
- Leigh Rayment's Historical List of MPs
- Genealogical Society of South Africa, Archives of the Peter Holden Collection

Parliament of the United Kingdom
| Preceded by Rennie Smith | Member of Parliament for Penistone; 1931 – 1935 | Succeeded by Henry McGhee |
| Preceded by William Carver | Member of Parliament for Howdenshire; 1945 – 1947 | Succeeded by George Odey |
