= Henry McGhee =

British politician (1898–1959)

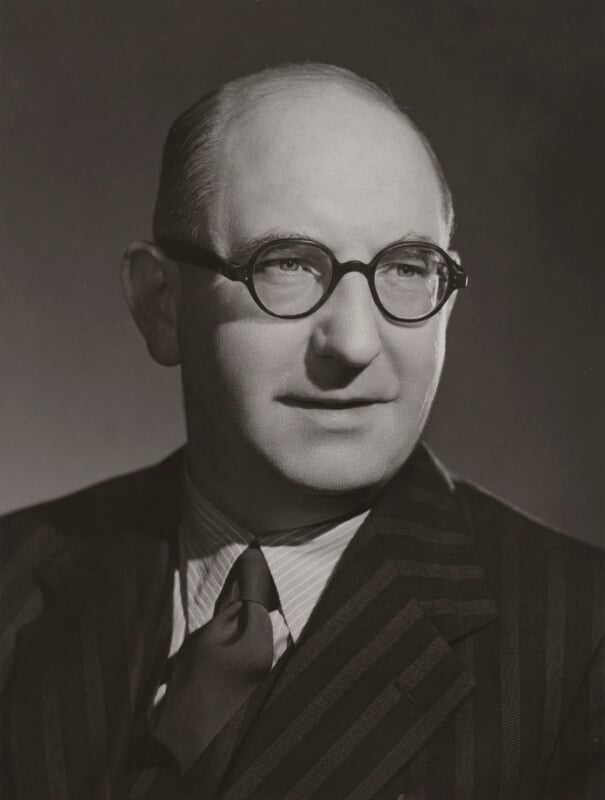
McGhee, c. 1950

Henry George McGhee (3 July 1898 – 6 February 1959) was a British Labour Party politician.

He was educated in Lurgan, County Armagh and Glasgow and was a dentist. He was elected at the 1935 general election as Member of Parliament (MP) for Penistone in the West Riding of Yorkshire and held the seat until his death in 1959 aged 60.

During the late 1930s he was a member of the Parliamentary Pacifist Group. In the late 1940s, he was treasurer of the Friends of Ireland.

His successor at the by-election following his death was John Mendelson.

He was the son of Irish MP, Richard McGhee.

Parliament of the United Kingdom
Preceded by Clifford William Hudson Glossop	Member of Parliament for Penistone; 1935 – 1959	Succeeded by John Mendelson
