= William Pringle (Birmingham politician) =

British politician and trade unionist

William Joseph Somerville Pringle (10 November 1916 – 21 October 1962) was a British politician and trade unionist.

Born in Putney, Pringle was the son of William Pringle, the Liberal Party member of Parliament, and Lilas Sommerville. He attended Bembridge School, and then studied science and technology at the Chelsea Polytechnic, and also economics through the University of London External Programmes. He married the prominent child psychologist Mia Lilly Kellmer on 18 April 1946.

In 1937, Pringle became a research chemist with the Cereals Research Station, moving to St Albans. He joined the Fabian Society in 1944, and was elected as a Labour Party member of St Albans City Council in 1945, then to Hertfordshire County Council in 1946. In 1950, he relocated to Birmingham to work for the National Coal Board. While there, he stood unsuccessfully for Birmingham Edgbaston at the 1951 general election, and for Birmingham Hall Green at the 1955 general election.

Pringle also became active in the Association of Scientific Workers, and through it, the World Federation of Scientific Workers (WFSW). He served on the council of the WFSW, with responsibility for co-ordinating the groups in Western Europe, which involved much travel. He suffered a heart attack in 1962 and died at the age of 45.
