= Sarah Poulton Kalley =

Brazilian missionary (1825–1907)

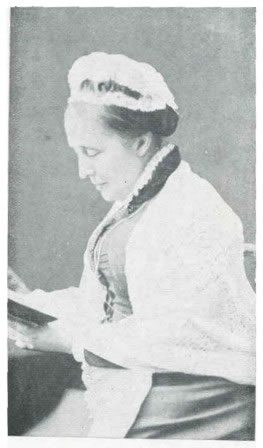
- Born: Sarah Poulton Wilson; 25 May 1825; Nottingham, England
- Died: 8 August 1907 (aged 82); Edinburgh, Scotland
- Occupation: Missionary
- Spouse: Robert Reid Kalley
- Parent(s): William Wilson and Sarah Morley
- Relatives: Henry Wilson (half-brother)

Sarah Poulton Kalley or Sarah Poulton Wilson (25 May 1825 – 8 August 1907) was a British missionary to Brazil who helped create a Portuguese language hymnal still in use today. She and her husband Robert Reid Kalley are credited with founding one of the first Congregational (and Protestant) churches in Brazil. This would in time become the Union of Congregational Churches in Brazil.

== Life ==
Sarah Poulton Wilson was born in Nottingham in 1825 to parents who were religious Nonconformist and political Reformists. Politician Henry Wilson was her half-brother. Her father had homes in Nottingham and Torquay. Sarah was well travelled and educated and she had talents for water colour painting and languages.

She led a group studying the Bible at Abbey Road Congregational chapel in the British seaside town of Torquay where she was caring for her brother. Robert Reid Kalley and his first wife Margaret Crawford had been doing missionary work among the poor on the Portuguese island of Madeira when they, along with their supporters, were arrested and expelled by anti-Protestants, taking temporary refuge on the island of Trinidad. The Kalleys spent two years seeking Christian converts among the followers of Islam, Judaism and Nestorianism in Malta, Egypt and Palestine, where it is believed Sarah became acquainted with Kalley. Following the death of Margaret, Kalley wed Sarah in Torquay in 1852.

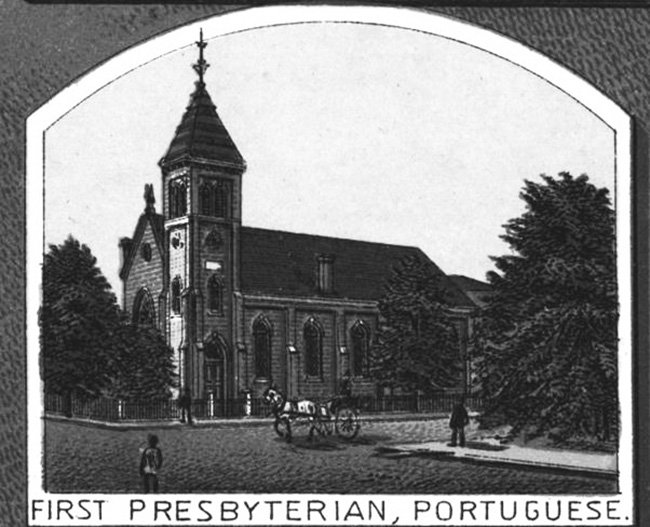
The First Presbyterian Portuguese Church in Springfield

Meanwhile, the Protestants who had been driven out of Madeira to work in Trinidad realised that they needed a better home. 150 moved to New York with funding from the American Protestant Society. The Maderira refugees were eventually invited by the people of Springfield to make their home in Illinois. On 13 November 1849 they were met with charity and an area of the town became known as Madeira. By 1853 there were about 1,000 Portuguese in Springfield. The Kalleys went to America and they served in the Springfield Portuguese Presbyterian Church 1853–1854 in Springfield, Illinois, where Sarah oversaw the Congregational music.

After a brief sojourn in England during the first months of 1855, the couple set out for Petrópolis, Brazil in April where they were welcomed into the Catholic country by their neighbor Brazilian emperor Pedro II. The emperor's liberal views were one of the reasons that they chose Brazil for their mission. The country also provided a welcoming religious climate that allowed Kalley's Portuguese-speaking followers from Madeira to join them. The founding of the first Protestant church in Brazil began in the Kalley's home where the hired help joined the Kalleys in evening worship. In August, Sarah organized a Sunday school class, followed less than a month later by Dr. Kalley organizing an adult Bible study. By 1856 they established a Portuguese evangelical church, which was formally organized on July 11, 1858 as Igreja Evangélica Fluminense. This would in time become the basis for the Union of Congregational Churches in Brazil.

Sarah advocated the power of faith through song, and the couple created a hymnal in the Portuguese language. The book contained original revivalist hymns as well as translations of hymns and psalms. Salmos e Hinos, co-authored by the Kalleys in 1861, was the first Protestant hymnal published in Brazil and became an inter-denominational hymnal, which is still in use today. The 1959 edition of the hymnal credits Sarah with authorship of 72 of the songs. The songs had been checked by a native Portuguese speaker after they were written, but some words like "white as snow" can still reflect the author's background. Sarah authored The Life of John Bunyan, and was the co-Portuguese language translator of his novel The Holy War.

Sarah also started a women's group at their church. After her husband's 1876 retirement, the couple returned to Edinburgh, where Robert died in 1888. Sarah continued to fund-raise for Brazil. She and John Fanstone started the Help for Brazil Missionary Society. The charity paid for a missionary to join Fanstone when he returned to Brazil in 1893. The continued to send out missionaries and in 1900 they had nine missionaries in Brazil. She died in Edinburgh in 1907. The missionary society she had founded struggled on until 1913 when its fund-raising started to fail and it merged with a similar charity.
