= John Mendelson =

British politician

Member of Parliament for Penistone
- In office 11 June 1959 – 20 May 1978
- Preceded by: Henry McGhee
- Succeeded by: Allen McKay

Personal details
- Born: John Jakob Mendelson; 6 July 1917 Płock, Poland
- Died: 20 May 1978 (aged 60) London, England
- Party: Labour
- Education: London School of Economics
- Profession: Academic

Military service
- Branch/service: British Army
- Years of service: 1939–1945
- Rank: Captain
- Battles/wars: World War II

John Jakob Mendelson (6 July 1917 – 20 May 1978) was a British Labour Party politician who was the Member of Parliament for Penistone from 1959 until his death.

== Early life ==
John Jakob Mendelson was born on 6 July 1917 in Płock, Poland, to a Jewish family, of which he was the only one who survived the Holocaust. He was educated in Berlin, and came to Britain to attend the London School of Economics. He served in the British Army as a captain during World War II, from 1939 to 1945. In 1949, he became a lecturer in political science at the University of Sheffield, and was vice-president of Sheffield Trades and Labour Council.

== Political career ==
Mendelson was elected MP for Penistone, South Yorkshire at a 1959 by-election, and served on the Public Accounts Committee. He was left-wing and a member of the Tribune Group. However, he clashed with some leftists on certain issues, such as the Soviet Union, which he voiced criticism of. Conversely, others accused him of being too sympathetic to the Soviet Union.

Mendelson was instrumental in persuading Harold Wilson to contest the Labour Party leadership in 1963, as a candidate of the left. He also introduced Tony Benn to the radical history of the Diggers and the Levellers, on which Benn drew from the 1970s onwards. In the 1970s, he opposed the Wilson government's wage freeze policies.

On foreign policy, Mendelson joined with Richard Crossman in 1959, in fervently opposing any efforts to give West Germany nuclear weapons. He was a member of the Labour Friends of Israel. Mendelson was also a staunch critic of American involvement in the Vietnam War and felt that the Wilson government should have been more vocally opposed to US foreign policy. In 1973, Mendelson became a member of the Consultative Assembly of the Council of Europe.

Mendelson died from a heart attack in London on 20 May 1978, at the age of 60. His successor at the subsequent by-election was Allen McKay.

Parliament of the United Kingdom
Preceded by Henry McGhee	Member of Parliament for Penistone; 1959–1978	Succeeded by Allen McKay
