= William Gillis (politician) =

British politician (1859–1929)

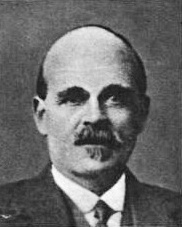

Member of Parliament for Penistone
- In office 1921–1922
- Preceded by: Sydney Arnold
- Succeeded by: William Pringle

Personal details
- Born: 10 November 1859 Black Sea
- Died: 18 September 1929 (aged 69)
- Party: Labour

William Gillis (10 November 1859 – 18 September 1929) was a British politician who served as an MP from 1918 and 1922.

== Biography ==
Born on a ship in the Black Sea on 10 November 1859, Gillis grew up in Gressenhall in Norfolk. He moved to the West Riding of Yorkshire and became active in the Yorkshire Miners' Association (YMA) and the Labour Party. He was elected to Hoyland Nether Urban District Council and served for a time as its chairman. He stood in the 1921 Penistone by-election, gaining the seat for Labour, but was defeated at the 1922 general election, and did not stand again. Following his stint in Parliament, he worked for the YMA and became a magistrate. Gillis died on 18 September 1929, aged 69.

Parliament of the United Kingdom
Preceded by Sydney Arnold	Member of Parliament for Penistone; 1921–1922	Succeeded by William Pringle
