= Robert Reid Kalley =

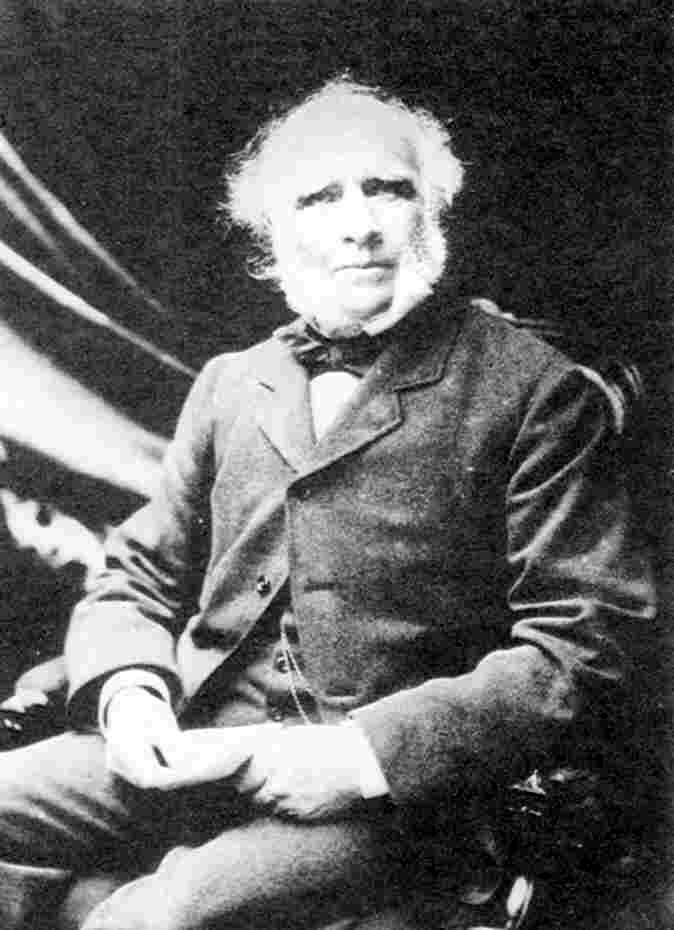
Robert Reid Kalley.

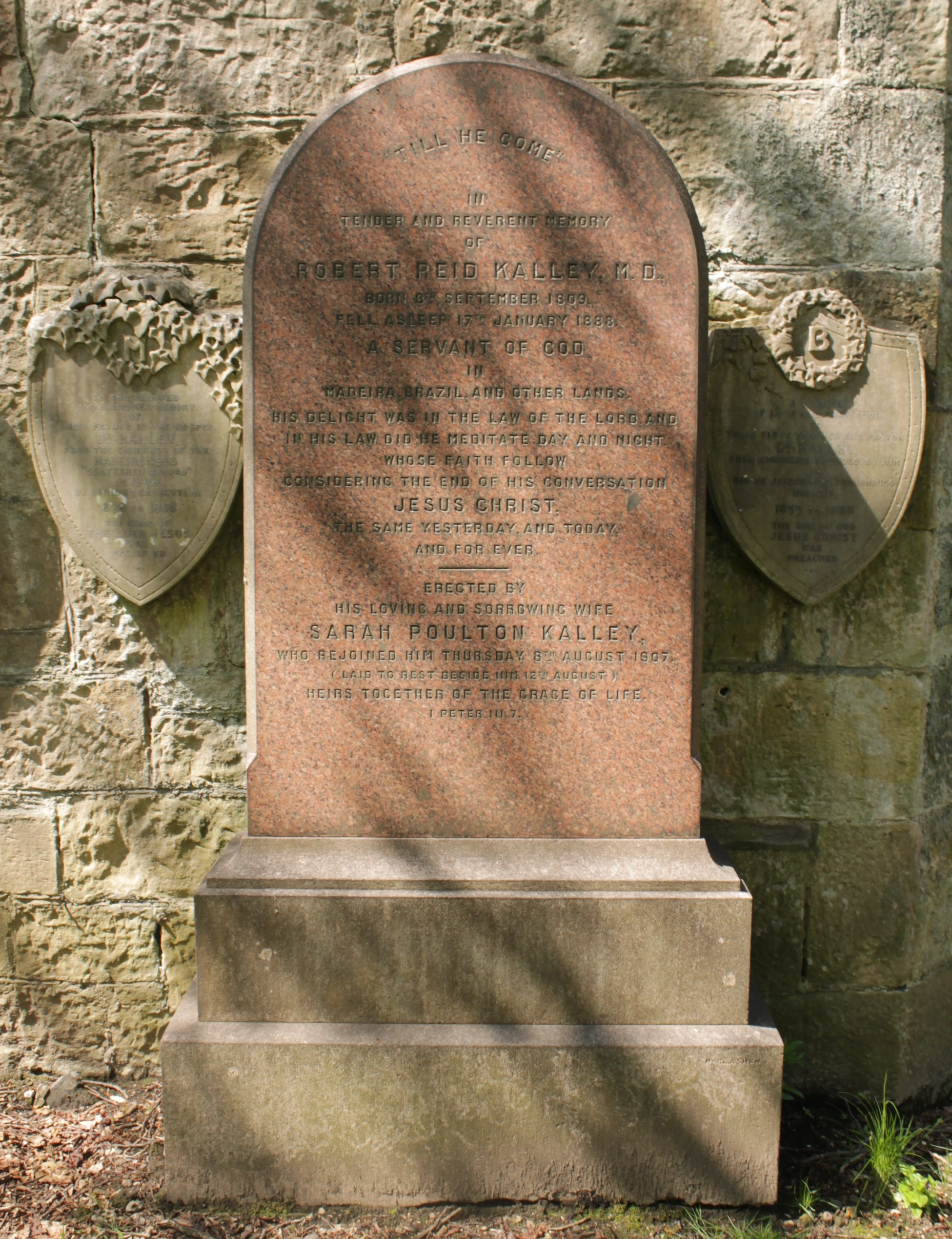
The grave of Robert Reid Kalley, Dean Cemetery

Robert Reid Kalley (September 1809 – 17 January 1888) was a Scottish physician and Presbyterian, later Congregationalist, missionary notable for his efforts to spread Presbyterian views in Portuguese-speaking territories and as the introducer of Protestantism in Portugal at a time when the only religion allowed to the Portuguese citizens was Roman Catholicism.

== Biography ==
Kalley was born on 8 September 1809 at 13 Trongate in Glasgow, the son of Robert Kalley, a tea merchant. His father died when he was young. His mother remarried but then died herself, so he was raised by his stepfather. He attended Glasgow Grammar School. From 1823 he studied Arts at Glasgow University. From 1826 to 1829 he then studied medicine, graduating MB ChB in Pharmacy and Surgery. He then worked as a ship's doctor in the Bombay area and as a General practitioner in the Kilmarnock area before gaining his doctorate (MD) in 1838.

== Madeira ==
Kalley first went to Madeira Island in 1838 with his wife Margaret Crawford, whom he had just married. She was ill with tuberculosis and the move was intended to improve her health. They stayed eight years. Impressed with the poverty, illiteracy and ignorance of the Madeirans, Kalley exercised Medicine gratuituously and decided to teach people to read and to write. He also started to preach, importing translated versions of the Bible in Portuguese from England. He founded a small hospital and seventeen elementary schools on the island which he personally financed. The Catholic Church started to look with concern on these initiatives, since proselytising was forbidden by the Portuguese Constitutional Charter of 1826 and the Bishop of Funchal forbade Kalley's religious lectures in 1841. In 1843, the Bibles he had distributed in Madeira were forbidden, like the meetings at his home. On 8 May 1845 he founded the first Presbyterian Church of Portugal, in Funchal, ordaining presbyters and deacons, and celebrating the Lord's Supper for 61 Madeiran converts.

Since Protestantism wasn't allowed for Portuguese citizens, he faced charges of blasphemy and heresy and all the schools he had founded were closed in 1846. Some converts had to face charges of heresy, then still punishable by the death penalty. Kalley sought refuge at the house of the British Consul and had to leave the island in 1846 in disguise, heading for the United States. His followers were also obliged to leave the island and they took the only offer which was to become labourers in Trinidad.

Kalley was in the British Crown Colony of Malta and later Beirut in 1851 where his first wife died. He met Sarah Poulton Wilson and married her in Torquay (England) on 14 December 1852. Meanwhile, the Protestants who had been driven out of Madeira to work in Trinidad realised that they needed a better home. 150 moved to New York with funding from the American Protestant Society. The Madeira refugees were eventually invited by the people of Jacksonville, Illinois (just west of Springfield) to make their home in Illinois. On 13 November 1849 they were met with a heartfelt welcome, and an area of the town became known as "Portuguese Hill". By 1853 there were about 1,000 Portuguese in Jacksonville. In the year after their marriage, Kalley and his wife both visited the settlements in Jacksonville and neighboring Springfield.

== Brazil ==
Kalley's biggest work, however, was in Brazil. Kalley arrived in Brazil in 1854, under the reign of Pedro II, and Catholicism was the country's official religion. The imperial constitution did not prohibit religious freedom, but it did prohibit any king of public religious worship other than those endorsed by Catholicism.

Despite not being the first foreign Protestant missionary on Brazilian soil, Kalley was the one who was the most fruitful there. In Rio de Janeiro, he and Sarah founded the Igreja Evangélica Fluminense, Fluminense Evangelical Church, which is still today the oldest Portuguese-speaking church in Brazil, and in Pernambuco, the Igreja Evangélica Pernambucana, Pernambucan Evangelical Church. With his support, Sarah created hymnals in Portuguese. She valued singing as a method of spreading the word and she developed ladies' meetings at their new church.

Despite his previous work as a Presbyterian, before coming to Brazil, Kalley became convinced of Congregationalist tenets. Thus, the first churches he established were Congregationalists with some doctrinal variations, such as baptizing only believers by aspersion, and following the Scottish tradition of closed service. Later, these first Protestant churches were called the Igrejas Cristãs Evangélicas, Evangelical Christian Churches. They became one of the strongest denominations in Brazil until the early 1990s, specially in the states of São Paulo (having its hub in São José dos Campos) and Goiás (having its hub in Goiânia and Anápolis).

He often had arguments with the Catholic church and was for a while prohibited from preaching on Brazilian soil.

Kalley became a close friend of Brazil's emperor Pedro II, with whom he often argued against slavery and prohibition of public worship.

He left Brazil in July 1876 and retired to Edinburgh where his expertise was used as a director of the Edinburgh Medical Missionary Society who prioritised medical help as well as missionary zeal.

Kalley died at his home, Campo Verde, Tipperlinn Road in western Edinburgh on 17 February 1888. He was survived by his wife Sarah. Sarah continued their work and supported the Help for Brazil charity. He is buried with his family on the hidden southern terrace of Dean Cemetery in western Edinburgh. The grave is flanked by plaques from his parishioners in Madeira and Brazil.
