= Helen Mary Wilson (physician) =

English medical doctor and social campaigner (1864–1951)

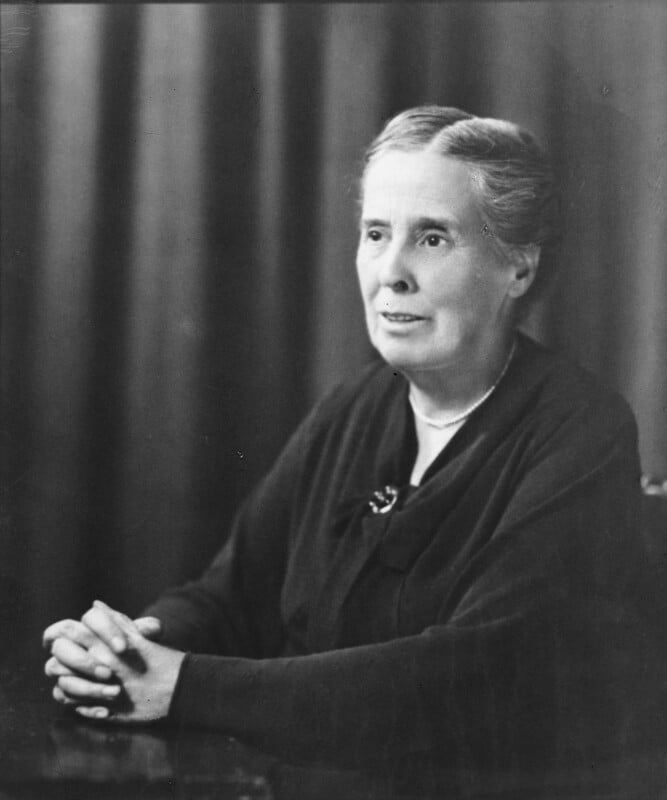
- Wilson in 1942
- Born: 1 December 1864; Mansfield, Nottinghamshire, England
- Died: 29 December 1951 (aged 87); Finchley, London, England
- Parent(s): Henry Wilson; Charlotte Cowan Wilson

Signature
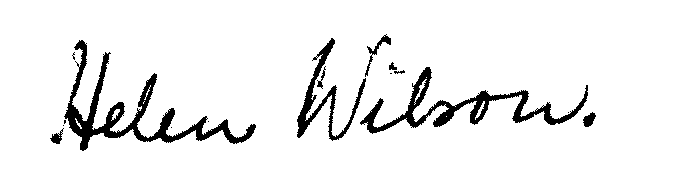

Helen Mary Wilson (1 December 1864 – 29 December 1951) was an English medical doctor and social purity campaigner.

Wilson was born in Mansfield, Nottinghamshire and moved to Sheffield early in her childhood. She studied medicine at the London School of Medicine for Women.

In 1892, Wilson was House surgeon at the London Temperance Hospital. She worked in private practice in Sheffield from 1893 until 1906, when she retired to become actively involved in the Association for Moral and Social Hygiene, previously known as the Ladies' National Association for the Repeal of the Contagious Diseases Acts. She took a humane approach to women in and in danger of falling into prostitution, rather than punitive one, and argued against double standards in the law on prostitution. From 1916 to 1919 she was Chair of the Women's Training Colony in Newbury, Berkshire, a work camp that aimed to provide responsibility, independence and occupation.

Wilson had an interest in women's suffrage, serving as honorary secretary of the Sheffield Women's Suffrage Society in 1909–1910 and also as president. In 1920, she was appointed magistrate in Sheffield, the first woman to hold the role in Sheffield. Wilson died in 1951, in London.

== Archives ==
Archival materials relating to Wilson are held at The Women's Library at the London School of Economics, including a scrapbook of Dr Wilson's containing ephemera relating to the suffrage campaigns in Sheffield and the Sheffield Women's Suffrage Society.
