= Penistone (constituency) =

Parliamentary constituency in the United Kingdom, 1918–1983

- Former county constituency for the House of Commons
- County: West Riding of Yorkshire

1918–1983
- Seats: One
- Created from: Hallamshire and Holmfirth
- Replaced by: Barnsley West & Penistone and Sheffield Hillsborough

Penistone was a Parliamentary constituency covering the town of Penistone in Yorkshire and surrounding countryside. It returned one Member of Parliament (MP) to the House of Commons of the Parliament of the United Kingdom, elected by the first-past-the-post voting system.

== History ==
The constituency was created for the 1918 general election and abolished for the 1983 general election.

== Boundaries ==
1918–1950: The Urban Districts of Clayton West, Denby and Cumberworth, Gunthwaite and Ingbirchworth, Hoyland Swaine, Kirkburton, Penistone, Shelley, Shepley, Skelmanthorpe, Stocksbridge, and Thurlstone, and the Rural Districts of Penistone and Wortley.

1950–1955: The Urban Districts of Denby Dale, Dodworth, Hoyland Nether, Kirkburton, Penistone, and Stocksbridge, and the Rural Districts of Penistone and Wortley.

1955–1983: The Urban Districts of Dodworth, Hoyland Nether, Penistone, and Stocksbridge, and the Rural Districts of Penistone and Wortley.

The area formerly covered by this constituency was then placed mostly in the Barnsley West and Penistone constituency and partly in the Sheffield Hillsborough constituency.

Following a later boundary review, the Penistone and Stocksbridge constituency which came into force at the 2010 general election roughly covered a similar area to the old Penistone constituency.

== Members of Parliament ==
Election	Member	Party
1918	Sydney Arnold	Liberal
1921 by-election	William Gillis	Labour
1922	William Pringle	Liberal
1924	Rennie Smith	Labour
1931	Clifford Glossop	Conservative
1935	Henry McGhee	Labour
1959 by-election	John Mendelson	Labour
1978 by-election	Allen McKay	Labour
1983	constituency abolished: see Barnsley West and Penistone	

== Election results ==
=== Elections in the 1970s ===
General election 1979: Penistone
Party	Candidate	Votes	%	±%
Labour	Allen McKay	28,010	49.1	−5.1
Conservative	Ian James Dobkin	18,309	32.1	+8.1
Liberal	David Chadwick	10,772	18.9	−2.9
Majority		9,701	17.0	−13.2
Turnout		57,091	78.9	+4.2
Labour hold		Swing		

1978 Penistone by-election
Party	Candidate	Votes	%	±%
Labour	Allen McKay	19,424	45.5	−8.7
Conservative	Ian James Dobkin	14,053	32.9	+8.9
Liberal	David Chadwick	9,241	21.6	−0.2
Majority		5,371	12.6	−17.6
Turnout		42,718		
Labour hold		Swing		

General election October 1974: Penistone
Party	Candidate	Votes	%	±%
Labour	John Mendelson	27,146	54.2	+4.5
Conservative	G. C. W. Harris	12,011	24.0	−1.2
Liberal	David Chadwick	10,900	21.8	−1.7
Majority		15,135	30.2	+5.7
Turnout		50,057	74.7	−9.4
Labour hold		Swing		

General election February 1974: Penistone
Party	Candidate	Votes	%	±%
Labour	John Mendelson	27,797	49.7	−9.0
Conservative	A. D. Wilkinson	14,084	25.2	−2.5
Liberal	David Chadwick	13,140	23.5	+9.9
Campaign for Social Democracy	M. Eaden	867	1.6	New
Majority		13,713	24.5	−6.5
Turnout		55,888	84.1	+10.2
Labour hold		Swing		

General election 1970: Penistone
Party	Candidate	Votes	%	±%
Labour	John Mendelson	31,615	58.7	−3.6
Conservative	Alan Pickup	14,897	27.7	+4.3
Liberal	Derick Mirfin	7,347	13.6	−0.7
Majority		16,718	31.0	−7.9
Turnout		53,859	73.9	−5.0
Labour hold		Swing		

=== Elections in the 1960s ===
General election 1966: Penistone
Party	Candidate	Votes	%	±%
Labour	John Mendelson	31,419	62.3	+4.2
Conservative	Bryan Askew	11,817	23.4	−2.2
Liberal	Ronald Swinden	7,191	14.3	−2.0
Majority		19,602	38.9	+6.4
Turnout		50,427	78.9	−2.2
Labour hold		Swing		

General election 1964: Penistone
Party	Candidate	Votes	%	±%
Labour	John Mendelson	29,784	58.1	−3.0
Conservative	Bryan Askew	13,095	25.6	−13.3
Liberal	Ronald Swinden	8,372	16.3	New
Majority		16,689	32.5	+10.3
Turnout		51,251	81.1	−1.9
Labour hold		Swing		

=== Elections in the 1950s ===
General election 1959: Penistone
Party	Candidate	Votes	%	±%
Labour	John Mendelson	31,117	61.1	−1.2
Conservative	John Bedford Deby	19,809	38.9	+1.2
Majority		11,308	22.2	−2.4
Turnout		50,926	83.0	+3.0
Labour hold		Swing		

1959 Penistone by-election
Party	Candidate	Votes	%	±%
Labour	John Mendelson	25,315	64.1	+1.8
Conservative	John Bedford Deby	14,196	35.9	−1.8
Majority		11,119	28.2	+3.6
Turnout		39,511		
Labour hold		Swing	+1.8	

General election 1955: Penistone
Party	Candidate	Votes	%	±%
Labour	Henry McGhee	29,432	62.3	−1.9
Conservative	Laurence B. Fulton	17,796	37.7	+1.9
Majority		11,636	24.6	−3.8
Turnout		47,228	80.0	−5.1
Labour hold		Swing		

General election 1951: Penistone
Party	Candidate	Votes	%	±%
Labour	Henry McGhee	36,169	64.2	+2.2
Conservative	Denton Hinchcliffe	20,145	35.8	+7.2
Majority		16,024	28.4	−5.0
Turnout		56,314	85.1	−2.6
Labour hold		Swing		

General election 1950: Penistone
Party	Candidate	Votes	%	±%
Labour	Henry McGhee	34,979	62.0	−3.8
Conservative	Denton Hinchcliffe	16,128	28.6	−5.6
Liberal	Anthony F Smith	5,316	9.4	New
Majority		18,851	33.4	+1.8
Turnout		56,423	87.7	+12.6
Labour hold		Swing		

=== Elections in the 1940s ===
General election 1945: Penistone
Party	Candidate	Votes	%	±%
Labour	Henry McGhee	40,180	65.8	+12.3
Conservative	R. G. Davies	20,869	34.2	−12.3
Majority		19,311	31.6	+24.6
Turnout		61,049	75.1	+1.8
Labour hold		Swing		

=== Elections in the 1930s ===
General election 1935: Penistone
Party	Candidate	Votes	%	±%
Labour	Henry McGhee	23,869	53.5	+17.9
Conservative	Clifford Glossop	20,783	46.5	−1.2
Majority		3,086	7.0	N/A
Turnout		44,652	73.3	−8.6
Labour gain from Conservative		Swing		

General election 1931: Penistone
Party	Candidate	Votes	%	±%
Conservative	Clifford Glossop	19,556	47.7	+19.8
Labour	Rennie Smith	14,584	35.6	−9.6
Liberal	Thomas Neville	6,821	16.7	−10.2
Majority		4,972	12.1	N/A
Turnout		40,961	81.9	+0.3
Conservative gain from Labour		Swing		

=== Elections in the 1920s ===
General election 1929: Penistone
Party	Candidate	Votes	%	±%
Labour	Rennie Smith	17,286	45.2	+6.7
Unionist	Francis George Bibbings	10,640	27.9	−6.2
Liberal	Ashley Mitchell	10,277	26.9	−0.5
Majority		6,646	17.3	+12.9
Turnout		38,203	81.6	+1.0
Registered electors		46,810		
Labour hold		Swing	+6.5	

General election 1924: Penistone
Party	Candidate	Votes	%	±%
Labour	Rennie Smith	10,997	38.5	+5.0
Unionist	Charles Hodgkinson (soldier)	9,718	33.1	+4.5
Liberal	William Pringle	7,799	27.4	−9.5
Majority		1,279	4.4	N/A
Turnout		28,514	80.6	+8.8
Registered electors		35,358		
Labour gain from Liberal		Swing	+7.3	

General election 1923: Penistone
Party	Candidate	Votes	%	±%
Liberal	William Pringle	9,164	36.9	+1.1
Labour	Rennie Smith	8,329	33.5	−0.2
Unionist	Charles Hodgkinson (soldier)	7,369	29.6	−0.9
Majority		835	3.4	+1.3
Turnout		24,862	71.8	−1.3
Registered electors		34,612		
Liberal hold		Swing	+0.7	

General election 1922: Penistone
Party	Candidate	Votes	%	±%
Liberal	William Pringle	8,924	35.8	−3.6
Labour	William Gillis	8,382	33.7	N/A
Unionist	Charles Hodgkinson (soldier)	7,600	30.5	−5.7
Majority		542	2.1	−1.1
Turnout		24,906	73.1	+14.7
Registered electors		34,071		
Liberal hold		Swing	+1.1	

1921 Penistone by-election
Party	Candidate	Votes	%	±%
Labour	William Gillis	8,560	36.2	New
Liberal	William Pringle	7,984	33.7	−5.7
National Liberal	James Peace Hinchcliffe	7,123	30.1	−6.1
Majority		576	2.5	N/A
Turnout		23,667	71.7	+13.3
Registered electors		32,988		
Labour gain from Liberal		Swing		

=== Elections in the 1910s ===
Sydney Arnold

General election 1918: Penistone
Party		Candidate	Votes	%	±%
	Liberal	Sydney Arnold	7,338	39.4	
C	Unionist	Phillip Gatty Smith	6,744	36.2	
	Independent Labour	Frederick William Southern	4,556	24.4	
Majority			594	3.2	
Turnout			18,638	58.4	
Registered electors			31,928		
	Liberal win (new seat)				
C indicates candidate endorsed by the coalition government.

== Sources ==
- Leigh Rayment's Historical List of MPs – Constituencies beginning with "P" (part 1)
- Richard Kimber's Political Science Resources (Election results since 1951)
