= William Pringle (Liberal MP) =

British politician (1874–1928)

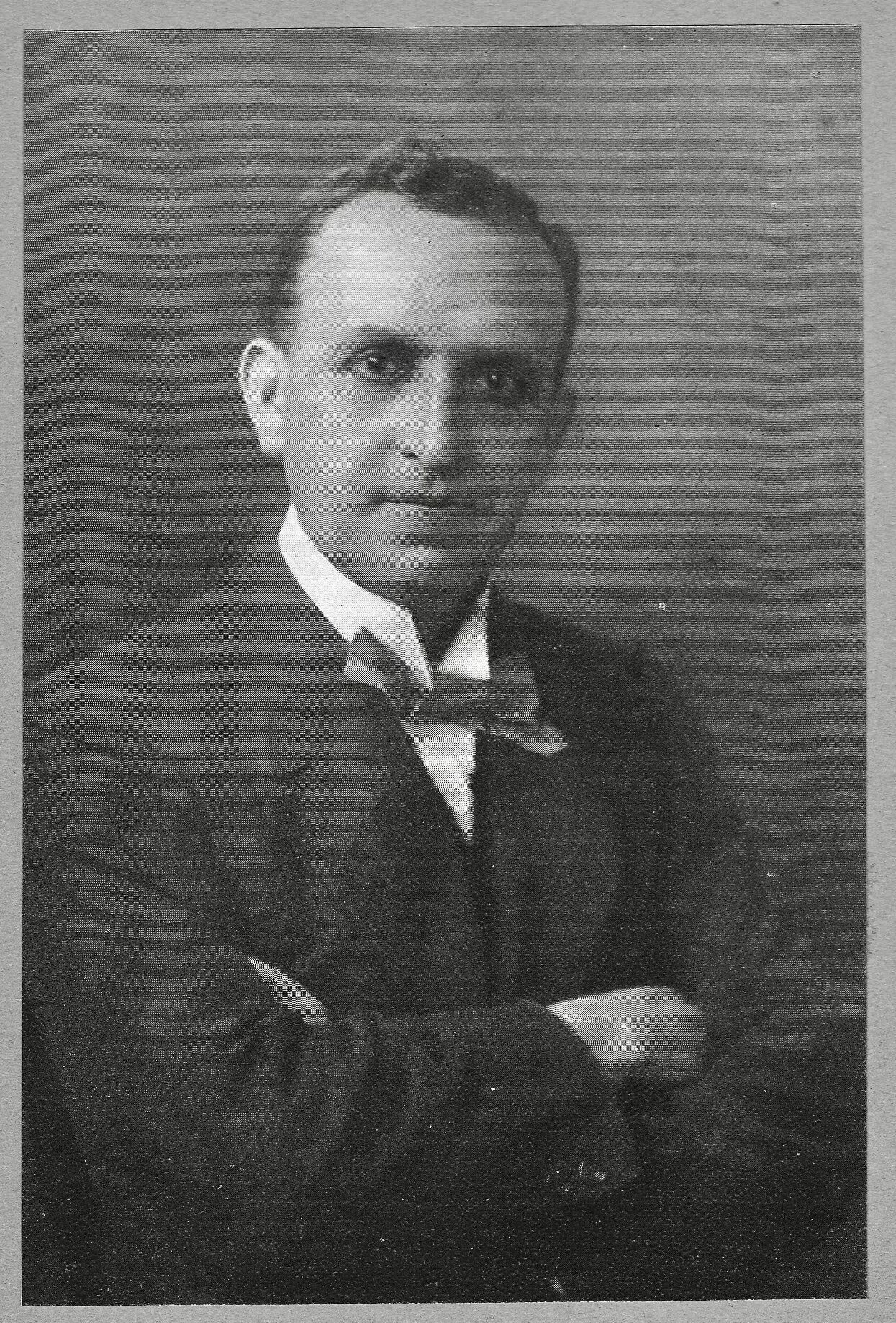
- Pringle in November 1922

Member of Parliament for Penistone
- In office 15 November 1922 – 29 October 1924
- Preceded by: William Gillis
- Succeeded by: Rennie Smith

Member of Parliament for North West Lanarkshire
- In office 15 January 1910 – 14 December 1918
- Preceded by: William Mitchell-Thomson
- Succeeded by: Constituency abolished

Personal details
- Born: William Mather Rutherford Pringle; 22 January 1874
- Died: 1 April 1928 (aged 54)
- Party: Liberal
- Children: William Pringle
- Education: Glasgow University
- Occupation: Lawyer

William Mather Rutherford Pringle (22 January 1874 – 1 April 1928) was a Liberal Party politician in the United Kingdom who served as a Member of Parliament (MP) from 1910 to 1918 and again from 1922 to 1924.

== Early life and career ==
Pringle was educated at Glasgow University and was called to the Bar at the Middle Temple in 1904.

== Political career ==
=== Lanarkshire (1910–1918) ===
He first stood for parliament at the 1906 elections, before he was elected as member for North West Lanarkshire in January 1910. It was an exceptional result as it was one of only a handful of gains made by the Liberal party at those elections, and achieved, despite the presence of a Labour candidate.

In 1914, as a back-bench Liberal MP, he supported Britain going to war in Europe but he opposed the introduction of Conscription being planned by Asquith. Although Pringle remained a supporter of the party led by Asquith, he was very critical of the party leader during the war. After the war, he returned to being a strong supporter of Asquith. He was described as "one of the ablest Parliamentary tacticians of the 20th Century" and also as "one of the most intransigeant and pertinacious of anti-Lloyd George Liberals". In 1916, when Lloyd George took over as prime minister, Pringle, along with James Hogge, became the most vocal critics of the Prime Minister from the Liberal benches. After the war, the Pringle-Hogge partnership ended when Pringle became a loyal supporter of Asquith, while Hogge looked to Lloyd George for peacetime inspiration. His Lanarkshire seat was abolished as part of the boundary changes for the 1918 elections, so he had to look for a new seat. Standing as a Liberal without the support from the Coalition government, he unsuccessfully contested Glasgow Springburn at the 1918 general election.

=== Post Defeat and Return (1918–1924) ===
He sought a return to parliament at Rusholme at a by-election in 1919. During the Rusholme by-election, he declared for a Capital Levy which was not party policy. Still keen to return to parliament, he fought another by-election in Penistone. At the 1922 general election he was elected as Member of Parliament for Penistone, defeating the sitting Labour MP William Gillis, who had narrowly beaten Pringle to win the seat at a by-election in 1921.

By 1924 he had become a member of Asquith's Liberal Shadow Cabinet, and he was a vocal critic of the Labour Government, accusing it of not getting ahead with reforming measures. He was defeated at the 1924 general election by Labour's Rennie Smith;

=== Post Parliamentary ===
After his election defeat in 1924, Pringle led Liberal candidate criticisms of Lloyd George for failing to make sufficient money from the Lloyd George Fund available to help the Liberal campaign. He helped to form the Liberal and Radical Candidates Association, becoming its inaugural Chairman and argued that this body should be part of the process in electing the next Chairman of the Liberal Parliamentary party. He hoped that this would help prevent Lloyd George taking that position but Asquith, now out of parliament, did not support his proposal and Lloyd George took over as Chairman.

He stood in the 1925 Ayr Burghs by-election, but finished a poor third

After Lloyd George took over as Leader from Asquith, Pringle put his efforts into a newly created body called the Liberal Council, which sought to rally those in the Liberal Party who opposed Lloyd George. He did not stand for Parliament again.

=== Elections contested ===
==== UK Parliament elections ====
| Date of election | Constituency | Party | Votes | % | Result |
|---|---|---|---|---|---|
| 1906 | Glasgow Camlachie | Liberal | 2,871 | 33.5 | Not Elected (2nd) |
| 1910 (Jan) | North West Lanarkshire | Liberal | 8,422 | 47.7 | Elected |
| 1910 (Dec) | North West Lanarkshire | Liberal | 9,315 | 52.3 | Elected |
| 1918 | Glasgow Springburn | Liberal | 1,669 | 8.2 | Not Elected (3rd) |
| 1919 | Manchester Rusholme | Liberal | 3,923 | 19.1 | Not Elected (3rd) |
| 1921 | Penistone | Liberal | 7,984 | 33.7 | Not Elected (2nd) |
| 1922 | Penistone | Liberal | 8,924 | 35.8 | Elected |
| 1923 | Penistone | Liberal | 9,164 | 36.9 | Elected |
| 1924 | Penistone | Liberal | 7,799 | 27.4 | Not Elected (3rd) |
| 1925 | Ayr Burghs | Liberal | 4,656 | 18.6 | Not Elected (3rd) |

== Personal life ==
He died in 1928 aged 54.

Pringle's son, also William Pringle later became a politician and trade unionist.

Parliament of the United Kingdom
| Preceded by William Mitchell-Thomson | Member of Parliament for Lanarkshire North West; 1910–1918 | Succeeded by Thomas Adair as Member for Glasgow Shettleston |
| Preceded by William Gillis | Member of Parliament for Penistone; 1922–1924 | Succeeded by Rennie Smith |
