= 1921 Penistone by-election =

UK parliamentary by-election

← 1918	5 March 1921	1922 →

Candidate	William Gillis	William Pringle	James Peace Hinchcliffe
Party	Labour	Liberal	National Liberal
Popular vote	8,560	7,984	7,123
Percentage	36.2%	33.7%	30.1%
MP before election
Sydney Arnold
Liberal
Subsequent MP
William Gillis
Liberal

The 1921 Penistone by-election was a by-election held on 5 March 1921 for the British House of Commons constituency of Penistone in Yorkshire.

== Vacancy ==
The seat had become vacant on the resignation of the Liberal Member of Parliament Sydney Arnold, due to ill-health. He had held the seat since its creation for the 1918 general election.

== Electoral history ==
The result at the last General Election in 1918 was;

Sydney Arnold

General election 1918: Penistone Electorate
Party		Candidate	Votes	%	±%
	Liberal	Sydney Arnold	7,338	39.4	
C	Unionist	Phillip Gatty Smith	6,744	36.2	
	Independent Labour	Frederick William Southern	4,556	24.4	
Majority			594	3.2	
Turnout			18,638	58.4	
	Liberal hold		Swing		
C indicates candidate endorsed by the coalition government.

== Candidates ==
- Upon the announcement of the resignation of Arnold, the local Liberals immediately adopted 47-year-old William Pringle as their candidate to defend the seat. Pringle was the member for Lanarkshire North West from January 1910 to 1918. In 1918 his Lanarkshire seat was abolished and he unsuccessfully contested Glasgow Springburn. He unsuccessfully sought a return to parliament at the 1919 Manchester Rusholme by-election.
- The Coalition government candidate was the Liberal, Sir James Peace Hinchcliffe who had the official support of the local Unionists.
- The Labour Party selected Alderman William Gillis as their candidate to challenge for the seat.

== Campaign ==
Polling Day was set for 5 March, making it the fourth by-election to be held that week. On 25 February nominations closed to confirm that the election would be a three-way contest.

Sir James Hinchcliffe received the official endorsement of the Coalition Government.

== Result ==
The result was a gain for the Labour Party.

1921 Penistone by-election Electorate
Party	Candidate	Votes	%	±%
Labour	William Gillis	8,560	36.2	New
Liberal	William Pringle	7,984	33.7	−5.7
National Liberal	James Peace Hinchcliffe	7,123	30.1	−6.1
Majority		576	2.5	N/A
Turnout		23,667	71.7	+13.3
Labour gain from Liberal		Swing		

== Aftermath ==
Pringle reversed the tables on Gillis at the following General Election when the Liberals re-gained the seat from the Labour Party;

William Pringle

1922 general election Electorate
Party	Candidate	Votes	%	±%
Liberal	William Pringle	8,924	35.8	−3.6
Labour	William Gillis	8,382	33.7	N/A
Conservative	Charles Hodgkinson	7,600	30.5	−5.7
Majority		542	2.1	−1.1
Turnout		24,906	73.1	+14.7
Liberal hold		Swing	+1.1	

== See also ==
- United Kingdom by-election records
- Penistone constituency
- 1959 Penistone by-election
- Penistone
- List of United Kingdom by-elections (1918–1931)
