= Penistone and Stocksbridge =

UK Parliament constituency (since 2010)

Coordinates: 53.508°N 1.607°W

- County constituency for the House of Commons
- Boundaries since 2010
- Boundary of Penistone and Stocksbridge in Yorkshire and the Humber
- County: South Yorkshire
- Electorate: 70,311 (December 2019)
- Major settlements: Stocksbridge, Penistone, Chapeltown

Current constituency
- Created: 2010
- Member of Parliament: Marie Tidball
- Seats: One
- Created from: Sheffield Hillsborough (part) (still extant); Barnsley West and Penistone (part)

Penistone and Stocksbridge is a constituency (Note: A county constituency (for the purposes of election expenses and type of returning officer).) in South Yorkshire represented in the House of Commons of the UK Parliament since 2024 by Marie Tidball, a Labour MP. As with all Westminster constituencies, adults qualifying to vote in the seat elect one Member of Parliament (MP) by the first past the post system at least every five years.

== Constituency profile ==
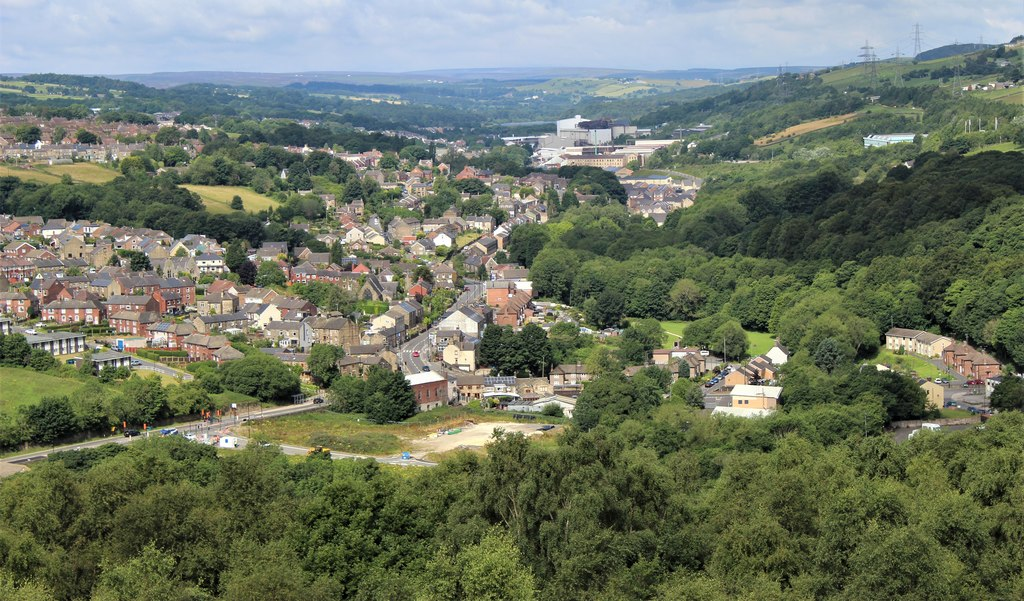
Stocksbridge and Deepcar

Penistone and Stocksbridge is a constituency in South Yorkshire in England, covering parts of the City of Sheffield and Barnsley metropolitan boroughs. It is named after the towns of Penistone and Stocksbridge, although Chapeltown is its largest town when taken together with its contiguous village of High Green. Other villages include Ecclesfield, Grenoside, Oughtibridge, Deepcar and Dodworth.

This constituency covers a mostly rural area to the north of Sheffield. The towns of Penistone and Stocksbridge are located at the foot of the Pennine Hills close to the Peak District National Park. This area has an industrial heritage; Dodworth and its surroundings have a history of coal mining and Stocksbridge and Chapeltown had significant steel industries. Penistone is traditionally less industrial and instead functions as a rural market town. The constituency contains three large stately homes: Cannon Hall, Wortley Hall and Wentworth Castle. Penistone and Stocksbridge has overall average levels of wealth; there is some deprivation in Stocksbridge, High Green and Ecclesfield whilst Penistone and the rural areas are mostly affluent. House prices across the constituency are generally similar to the rest of Yorkshire but lower than the UK average.

Penistone and Stocksbridge has a large retired population and a below-average proportion of young adults. Residents have average levels of income, high rates of homeownership, and the child poverty rate is low. They have average levels of education and a high proportion work in the retail and manufacturing sectors. The percentage claiming unemployment benefits is low. White people made up 97% of the population at the 2021 census.

At the local council level, Stocksbridge and Dodworth are mostly represented by Labour Party councillors and Penistone and Chapeltown mostly by Liberal Democrats. Some Reform UK councillors were elected across the constituency. Voters here strongly supported leaving the European Union in the 2016 referendum; an estimated 62% voted in favour of Brexit compared to the UK-wide rate of 52%.

== Boundaries ==
2010–present: The Metropolitan Borough of Barnsley wards of Dodworth, Penistone East, and Penistone West, and the City of Sheffield wards of Stocksbridge and Upper Don, East Ecclesfield and West Ecclesfield.

The 2023 Periodic Review of Westminster constituencies left the boundaries unchanged.

== History ==
The seat largely resembles the old Penistone constituency, which, following the election of a Conservative in the Conservative landslide in 1931, returned MPs representing the Labour Party through to its abolition in 1983.

In 1983, two new constituencies were formed, Sheffield Hillsborough and Barnsley West and Penistone, both of which returned Labour MPs at every election they were fought.

The 2010 result was that of a marginal Labour majority. In 2015, the Labour majority increased, partly due to a split right-wing vote between the Conservatives and UKIP, while the Liberal Democrats' vote decline largely benefited Labour in the seat.

When the UKIP vote declined in 2017, with a large number of those voters going to the Conservatives causing a swing of almost 6% against Labour, the seat became extremely marginal.

Elected as a member of the Labour Party, MP Angela Smith quit the party in February 2019 and joined Change UK. She left this party in June 2019 and joined The Independents. She departed the parliamentary group in September 2019 and joined the Liberal Democrats. Smith chose not to defend her seat at the 2019 election; she instead contested Altrincham and Sale West for the Liberal Democrats, failing to gain the seat. At that election, Penistone and Stocksbridge was one of three seats gained by the Conservatives in South Yorkshire, the party's first seats there since before the 1997 general election. This was reversed at the 2024 general election when Labour regained this seat on a substantial swing and once again held all the South Yorkshire parliamentary constituencies.

== Members of Parliament ==
Barnsley West & Penistone and Sheffield Hillsborough prior to 2010

Election	Member	Party
2010	Angela Smith	Labour
Feb 2019	Angela Smith	Change UK
Jun 2019	Angela Smith	Independent
Jul 2019	Angela Smith	The Independents
Sep 2019	Angela Smith	Liberal Democrats
2019	Miriam Cates	Conservative
2024	Marie Tidball	Labour

== Elections ==
=== Elections in the 2020s ===
General election 2024: Penistone and Stocksbridge
Party	Candidate	Votes	%	±%
Labour	Marie Tidball	19,169	43.6	+10.3
Conservative	Miriam Cates	10,430	23.7	–24.1
Reform	Edward Dillingham	9,456	21.5	+12.8
Liberal Democrats	Robert Reiss	2,866	6.5	–3.7
Green	Andrew Davies	2,044	4.6	N/A
Majority		8,739	19.9	N/A
Turnout		43,965	62.1	–7.3
Registered electors		70,770		
Labour gain from Conservative		Swing	+17.2	

=== Elections in the 2010s ===
General election 2019: Penistone and Stocksbridge
Party	Candidate	Votes	%	±%
Conservative	Miriam Cates	23,688	47.8	+4.6
Labour	Francyne Johnson	16,478	33.3	–12.5
Liberal Democrats	Hannah Kitching	5,054	10.2	+6.1
Brexit Party	John Booker	4,300	8.7	N/A
Majority		7,210	14.5	N/A
Turnout		49,520	69.8	Steady
Conservative gain from Labour		Swing	+8.6	

General election 2017: Penistone and Stocksbridge
Party	Candidate	Votes	%	±%
Labour	Angela Smith	22,807	45.8	+3.8
Conservative	Nicola Wilson	21,485	43.2	+15.5
UKIP	John Booker	3,453	6.9	–16.0
Liberal Democrats	Penny Baker	2,042	4.1	–2.2
Majority		1,322	2.6	–11.7
Turnout		49,787	69.8	+3.9
Labour hold		Swing	–5.8	

General election 2015: Penistone and Stocksbridge
Party	Candidate	Votes	%	±%
Labour	Angela Smith	19,691	42.0	+4.2
Conservative	Steven Jackson	12,968	27.7	–3.5
UKIP	Graeme Waddicar	10,738	22.9	+18.7
Liberal Democrats	Rosalyn Gordon	2,957	6.3	–14.8
English Democrat	Colin Porter	500	1.1	0.0
Majority		6,723	14.3	+7.7
Turnout		46,854	65.9	–2.0
Labour hold		Swing		

General election 2010: Penistone and Stocksbridge
Party	Candidate	Votes	%	±%
Labour	Angela Smith*	17,565	37.8	–7.4
Conservative	Spencer Pitfield	14,516	31.2	+7.5
Liberal Democrats	Ian Cuthbertson	9,800	21.1	–3.7
BNP	Paul James	2,207	4.7	N/A
UKIP	Grant French	1,936	4.2	+2.5
English Democrat	Paul McEnhill	492	1.1	N/A
Majority		3,049	6.6	
Turnout		46,516	67.9	+5.8
Labour win (new seat)				

* Served as an MP in the 2005–2010 Parliament

== See also ==
- List of parliamentary constituencies in South Yorkshire
- List of parliamentary constituencies in the Yorkshire and the Humber (region)

== Sources ==
- Sheffield Recommendations of the Boundary Commission for England.
- Summary of the Sheffield Parliamentary Boundary Review.
