= Doncaster parliamentary constituencies =

Parliamentary constituencies of Doncaster, England

Doncaster is divided into and across three parliamentary constituencies.

== History ==
Former constituencies of Doncaster (1997–2010).

From the 1885 general election to the 1983 general election, Doncaster was represented by the sole Doncaster constituency. From 1997 to 2010, it was divided into 4 constituencies, with the Barnsley East and Mexborough constituency consisting of wards in Barnsley and the Mexborough area. This constituency was abolished for the 2010 general election and the Mexborough area was added to the Doncaster North constituency.

=== Party representation since 1950 ===
Constituency	1950	1951	1955	1959	1964	1966	1970	Feb 1974	Oct 1974	1979	1983	1987	1992	1997	2001	2005	2010	2015	2017	2019	2024
Doncaster	Gunter	Barber			Walker																
Doncaster Central											Walker			Winterton							
Doncaster North											Welsh		Hughes			Miliband					
Don Valley											Redmond			Flint						Fletcher	To be abolished
Barnsley East and Mexborough														Ennis							
Doncaster East and the Isle of Axholme																					Lee Pitcher
