= Public Accounts Committee (United Kingdom) =

UK House of Commons select committee

The Committee of Public Accounts is a select committee of the British House of Commons. It is responsible for overseeing government expenditures, and to ensure they are effective and honest. The committee is seen as a crucial mechanism for ensuring transparency and accountability in government financial operations, having been described by Professor the Lord Hennessy as "the queen of the select committees...[which] by its very existence exert[s] a cleansing effect in all government departments".

== Overview ==
The recommendation for the creation of a committee to oversee government accounts was first put forward in 1857 by a small group of interested Members of Parliament led by Sir Francis Baring. The structure and function of the PAC date back to reforms initiated by William Ewart Gladstone, when he was British Chancellor of the Exchequer in the 1860s. The first Public Accounts Committee was established in 1862 by a resolution of the British House of Commons:

There shall be a standing committee designated "The Committee of Public Accounts"; for the examination of the Accounts showing the appropriation of sums granted by Parliament to meet the Public Expenditure, to consist of nine members, who shall be nominated at the commencement of every Session, and of whom five shall be a quorum.

The form has since been replicated in virtually all Commonwealth of Nations and many non-Commonwealth countries. A minister from His Majesty's Treasury sits on the committee but, by convention, does not attend hearings. The chair of the committee is always drawn from the main opposition party and is usually a former senior Minister.

The Exchequer and Audit Departments Act 1866 appointed The Committee of Public Accounts to oversee the work of the Comptroller and Auditor General (C&AG) The Committee continues to be assisted by the C&AG who is a permanent witness at its hearings, along with his staff of the National Audit Office, who provide briefings on each report and assist in the preparation of the committee's own reports.

== Chairs ==
Committee chairs include those listed below. House of Commons standing orders give the party of the official Opposition the right to chair the committee.

Name	Start	End	Party	Constituency
Francis Baring	1861	1863	Liberal	Portsmouth
Edward Pleydell-Bouverie	1864	1866	Liberal	Kilmarnock Burghs
George Sclater-Booth	1866	1866	Conservative	North Hampshire
Hugh Childers	1867	1868	Liberal	Pontefract
William Pollard-Urquhart	1869	1869	Liberal	County Westmeath
George Hunt	1870	1871	Conservative	North Northamptonshire
George Sclater-Booth	1872	1873	Conservative	North Hampshire
John Dodson	1874	1876	Liberal	Chester
Frederick Cavendish	1877	1880	Liberal	West Riding of Yorkshire North
Henry Holland	1884	1885	Conservative	Midhurst
John Gorst	1886	1886	Conservative	Chatham
John Lubbock	1887	1888	Liberal Unionist	London University
Ughtred Kay-Shuttleworth	1889	1892	Liberal	Clitheroe
Edmond Wodehouse	1893	1893	Liberal Unionist	Bath
Richard Temple	1894	1895	Conservative	Kingston
Arthur O'Connor	1896	1900	Irish National	East Donegal
Arthur Hayter	1901	1905	Liberal	Walsall
Victor Cavendish	1906	1908	Liberal Unionist	West Derbyshire
Robert Williams	1908	1918	Conservative	West Dorset
Francis Acland	1919	1920	Liberal	Camborne
Aneurin Williams	1921	1922	Liberal	Consett
Fred Jowett	1923	1923	Labour	Bradford East
Walter Guinness	1924	1924	Conservative	Bury St Edmunds
William Graham	1924	1929	Labour	Edinburgh Central
Arthur Samuel	1929	1931	Conservative	Farnham
Morgan Jones	1931	1938	Labour	Caerphilly
Frederick Pethick-Lawrence	1938	1941	Labour	Edinburgh East
Walter Elliot	1941	1943	Unionist	Glasgow Kelvingrove
Assheton Pownall	1943	1945	Conservative	Lewisham East
Osbert Peake	1946	1948	Conservative	Leeds North
Ralph Assheton	1948	1950	Conservative	City of London
Ronald Cross	1950	1951	Conservative	Ormskirk
Charles Waterhouse	1950	1951	Conservative	Leicester South East
John Edwards	1951	1952	Labour	Brighouse and Spenborough
George Benson	1952	1959	Labour	Chesterfield
Harold Wilson	1959	1963	Labour	Huyton
Douglas Houghton	1963	1964	Labour	Sowerby
John Boyd-Carpenter	1964	1970	Conservative	Kingston-upon-Thames
Harold Lever	1970	1972	Labour	Manchester Cheetham
Edmund Dell; Acting	1972	1973	Labour	Birkenhead
Edward du Cann	1974	3 May 1979	Conservative	Taunton
Joel Barnett	3 May 1979	9 June 1983	Labour	Taunton
Robert Sheldon	9 June 1983	21 March 1997	Labour	Ashton-under-Lyne
David Davis	25 July 1997	11 May 2001	Conservative	Haltemprice and Howden
Edward Leigh	17 October 2001	6 May 2010	Conservative	Gainsborough
Margaret Hodge	10 June 2010	30 March 2015	Labour	Barking
Meg Hillier	18 June 2015	30 May 2024	Labour Co-op	Hackney South and Shoreditch
Geoffrey Clifton-Brown	11 September 2024	present	Conservative	North Cotswolds

== Membership ==
Membership of the committee is as follows:

Member	Party	Constituency
Geoffrey Clifton-Brown MP (chair)	Conservative	North Cotswolds
Clive Betts MP	Labour	Sheffield South East
Rachel Blake MP	Labour	Cities of London and Westminster
Al Carns MP	Labour	Birmingham Selly Oak
Anna Dixon MP	Labour	Shipley
Rachel Gilmour MP	Liberal Democrats	Tiverton and Minehead
Sarah Green MP	Liberal Democrats	Chesham and Amersham
Sarah Hall MP	Labour	Warrington South
Lloyd Hatton MP	Labour	South Dorset
Chris Kane MP	Labour	Stirling and Stratahallan
Rupert Lowe MP	Restore Britain (elected as Reform UK)	Great Yarmouth
Sarah Olney MP	Liberal Democrats	Richmond Park
Tris Osborne MP	Labour	Chatham and Aylesford
Blake Stephenson MP	Conservative	Mid Bedfordshire
Dan Tomlinson MP	Labour	Chipping Barnet
Matt Turmaine MP	Labour	Watford

=== Changes since 2024 ===
Date	Outgoing Member & Party	Constituency	→	New Member & Party	Constituency	Source
30 June 2025	Rebecca Paul MP (Conservative)	Reigate	→	Blake Stephenson MP (Conservative)	Mid Bedfordshire	Hansard
21 October 2025	Peter Fortune MP (Conservative)	Bromley and Biggin Hill	→	Rupert Lowe MP (Independent)	Great Yarmouth	Hansard
21 October 2025	James Murray MP (Labour)	Ealing North	→	Dan Tomlinson MP (Labour)	Chipping Barnet	Hansard
27 October 2025	Nesil Caliskan MP (Labour)	Barking	→	Catherine McKinnell MP (Labour)	Newcastle upon Tyne North	Hansard
27 October 2025	Luke Charters MP (Labour)	York Outer	→	Tris Osborne MP (Labour)	Chatham and Aylesford	Hansard
1 December 2025	Oliver Ryan MP (Labour)	Burnley	→	Matt Turmaine MP (Labour)	Watford	Hansard
11 November 2026	Catherine McKinnell MP (Labour)	Newcastle upon Tyne North	→	Al Carns MP (Labour)	Birmingham Selly Oak	Hansard
16 November 2026	Michael Payne MP (Labour)	Gedling	→	Rachel Blake MP (Labour)	Cities of London and Westminster	Hansard

== 2019-2024 Parliament ==
The chair was elected on 27 January 2020, with the members of the committee being announced on 2 March 2020.

Member	Party	Constituency
Dame Meg Hillier DBE MP (chair)	Labour and Co-op	Hackney South and Shoreditch
Gareth Bacon MP	Conservative Party	Orpington
Kemi Badenoch MP	Conservative Party	Saffron Walden
Olivia Blake MP	Labour Party	Sheffield Hallam
Sir Geoffrey Clifton-Brown MP	Conservative Party	The Cotswolds
Cheryl Gillan MP	Conservative Party	Chesham and Amersham
Peter Grant MP	Scottish National Party	Glenrothes
Richard Holden MP	Conservative Party	North West Durham
Sir Bernard Jenkin MP	Conservative Party	Harwich and North Essex
Craig Mackinlay MP	Conservative Party	South Thanet
Shabana Mahmood MP	Labour Party	Birmingham Ladywood
Gagan Mohindra MP	Conservative Party	South West Hertfordshire
Sarah Olney MP	Liberal Democrats	Richmond Park
Bridget Phillipson MP	Labour Party	Houghton and Sunderland South
Nick Smith MP	Labour Party	Blaenau Gwent
James Wild MP	Conservative	North West Norfolk

=== Changes 2019-2024 ===
Date	Outgoing Member & Party	Constituency	→	New Member & Party	Constituency	Source
21 September 2020	Bridget Phillipson MP (Labour)	Houghton and Sunderland South	→	Barry Gardiner MP (Labour)	Brent North	Hansard
9 November 2020	Gagan Mohindra MP (Conservative)	South West Hertfordshire	→	Shaun Bailey MP (Conservative)	West Bromwich West	Hansard
4 April 2021	Cheryl Gillan MP (Conservative)	Chesham and Amersham	→	Vacant		Death of member
20 April 2021	Shabana Mahmood MP (Labour)	Birmingham Ladywood	→	Dan Carden MP (Labour)	Liverpool Walton	Hansard
25 May 2021	Bernard Jenkin MP (Conservative)	Harwich and North Essex	→	Mark Francois MP (Conservative)	Rayleigh and Wickford	Hansard
25 May 2021	Vacant		→	Antony Higginbotham MP (Conservative)	Burnley	Hansard
13 July 2021	Olivia Blake MP (Labour)	Sheffield Hallam	→	Kate Osamor MP (Labour)	Edmonton	Hansard
30 November 2021	Kemi Badenoch MP (Conservative)	Saffron Walden	→	Helen Whately MP (Conservative)	Faversham and Mid Kent	Hansard
8 February 2022	Barry Gardiner MP (Labour)	Brent North	→	Kate Green MP (Labour)	Stretford and Urmston	Hansard
15 March 2022	Gareth Bacon MP (Conservative)	Orpington	→	Louie French MP (Conservative)	Old Bexley and Sidcup	Hansard
15 March 2022	Richard Holden MP (Conservative)	North West Durham	→	Angela Richardson MP (Conservative)	Guildford	Hansard
4 July 2022	Kate Osamor MP (Labour)	Edmonton	→	Olivia Blake MP (Labour)	Sheffield Hallam	Hansard
17 October 2022	Helen Whately MP (Conservative)	Faversham and Mid Kent	→	Felicity Buchan MP (Conservative)	Kensington	Hansard
25 October 2022	Shaun Bailey MP (Conservative)	West Bromwich West	→	Jonathan Djanogly MP (Conservative)	Huntingdonshire	Hansard
25 October 2022	Antony Higginbotham MP (Conservative)	Burnley	→	Anne Marie Morris MP (Conservative)	Newton Abbot	Hansard
25 October 2022	Craig Mackinlay MP (Conservative)	South Thanet	→	Vacant		Hansard
10 November 2022	Kate Green MP (Labour)	Stretford and Urmston	→	Vacant		Resignation of member from Parliament
15 November 2022	Felicity Buchan MP (Conservative)	Kensington	→	James Cartlidge MP (Conservative)	South Suffolk	Hansard
15 November 2022	Vacant		→	Flick Drummond MP (Conservative)	Meon Valley	Hansard
25 November 2022	James Wild MP (Conservative)	North West Norfolk	→	Vacant		Hansard
6 December 2022	Angela Richardson MP (Conservative)	Guildford	→	Simon Clarke MP (Conservative)	Middlesbrough South and East Cleveland	Hansard
6 December 2022	Vacant		→	Jill Mortimer MP (Conservative)	Hartlepool	Hansard
24 April 2023	Vacant		→	Ashley Dalton MP (Labour)	West Lancashire	Hansard
6 June 2023	James Cartlidge MP (Conservative)	South Suffolk	→	Gareth Davies MP (Conservative)	Grantham and Stamford	Hansard
26 June 2023	Louie French MP (Conservative)	Old Bexley and Sidcup	→	Ben Lake MP (Plaid Cymru)	Ceredigion	Hansard
11 December 2023	Ashley Dalton MP (Labour)	West Lancashire	→	Paula Barker MP (Labour)	Liverpool Wavertree	Hansard
11 December 2023	Jill Mortimer MP (Conservative)	Hartlepool	→	Sarah Owen MP (Labour)	Luton North	Hansard
11 December 2023	Nick Smith MP (Labour)	Blaenau Gwent	→	Sir Jeremy Quin MP (Conservative)	Horsham	Hansard
18 December 2023	Simon Clarke MP (Conservative)	Middlesbrough South and East Cleveland	→	Gary Sambrook MP (Conservative)	Birmingham Northfield	Hansard
29 January 2024	Dan Carden MP (Labour)	Liverpool Walton	→	Marie Rimmer MP (Labour)	St Helens South and Whiston	Hansard
18 March 2024	Sir Jeremy Quin MP (Conservative)	Horsham	→	Matt Warman MP (Conservative)	Boston and Skegness	Hansard
7 May 2024	Flick Drummond MP (Conservative)	Meon Valley	→	Richard Fuller MP (Conservative)	North East Bedfordshire	Hansard

== 2017–2019 Parliament ==
The chair was elected on 12 July 2017, with members being announced on 11 September 2017.

Member	Party	Constituency
Meg Hillier MP (chair)	Labour and Co-op	Hackney South and Shoreditch
Bim Afolami MP	Conservative	Hitchin and Harpenden
Heidi Allen MP	Conservative	South Cambridgeshire
Geoffrey Clifton-Brown MP	Conservative	The Cotswolds
Martyn Day MP	SNP	Linlithgow and East Falkirk
Chris Evans MP	Labour and Co-op	Islwyn
Caroline Flint MP	Labour	Don Valley
Luke Graham MP	Conservative	Ochil and South Perthshire
Andrew Jones MP	Conservative	Harrogate and Knaresborough
Gillian Keegan MP	Conservative	Chichester
Shabana Mahmood MP	Labour	Birmingham Ladywood
Nigel Mills MP	Conservative	Amber Valley
Layla Moran MP	Liberal Democrats	Oxford West and Abingdon
Bridget Phillipson MP	Labour	Houghton and Sunderland South
Gareth Snell MP	Labour and Co-op	Stoke-on-Trent Central

=== Changes 2017–2019 ===
Date	Outgoing Member & Party	Constituency	→	New Member & Party	Constituency	Source
5 February 2018	Andrew Jones MP (Conservative)	Harrogate and Knaresborough	→	Robert Jenrick MP (Conservative)	Newark	Hansard
20 February 2018	Heidi Allen MP (Conservative)	South Cambridgeshire	→	Anne Marie Morris MP (Conservative)	Newton Abbot	Hansard
20 February 2018	Nigel Mills MP (Conservative)	Amber Valley	→	Lee Rowley MP (Conservative)	North East Derbyshire	Hansard
9 July 2018	Martyn Day MP (SNP)	Linlithgow and East Falkirk	→	Douglas Chapman MP (SNP)	Dunfermline and West Fife	Hansard
22 October 2018	Bim Afolami MP (Conservative)	Hitchin and Harpenden	→	Chris Davies MP (Conservative)	Brecon and Radnorshire	Hansard
22 October 2018	Luke Graham MP (Conservative)	Ochil and South Perthshire	→	Nigel Mills MP (Conservative)	Amber Valley	Hansard
3 December 2018	Gillian Keegan MP (Conservative)	Chichester	→	Anne-Marie Trevelyan MP (Conservative)	Berwick-upon-Tweed	Hansard
21 June 2019	Chris Davies MP (Conservative)	Brecon and Radnorshire	→	Vacant		Recall of member from Parliament

== 2015–2017 Parliament ==
The chair was elected on 18 June 2015, with members being announced on 7 July 2015.

Member	Party	Constituency
Meg Hillier MP (chair)	Labour and Co-op	Hackney South and Shoreditch
Richard Bacon MP	Conservative	South Norfolk
Harriett Baldwin MP	Conservative	West Worcestershire
Deidre Brock MP	SNP	Edinburgh North and Leith
Kevin Foster MP	Conservative	Torbay
Stewart Jackson MP	Conservative	Peterborough
Clive Lewis MP	Labour	Norwich South
Nigel Mills MP	Conservative	Amber Valley
David Mowat MP	Conservative	Warrington South
Teresa Pearce MP	Labour	Erith and Thamesmead
Stephen Phillips MP	Conservative	Sleaford and North Hykeham
John Pugh MP	Liberal Democrats	Southport
Nick Smith MP	Labour	Blaenau Gwent
Karin Smyth MP	Labour	Bristol South
Anne-Marie Trevelyan MP	Conservative	Berwick-upon-Tweed

=== Changes 2015–2017 ===
Date	Outgoing Member & Party	Constituency	→	New Member & Party	Constituency	Source
26 October 2015	Clive Lewis MP (Labour)	Norwich South	→	Chris Evans MP (Labour and Co-op)	Islwyn	Hansard
26 October 2015	Teresa Pearce MP (Labour)	Erith and Thamesmead	→	Caroline Flint MP (Labour)	Don Valley	Hansard
26 October 2015	Nick Smith MP (Labour)	Blaenau Gwent	→	Bridget Phillipson MP (Labour)	Houghton and Sunderland South	Hansard
12 September 2016	Deidre Brock MP (SNP)	Edinburgh North and Leith	→	Phil Boswell MP (SNP)	Coatbridge, Chryston and Bellshill	Hansard
10 October 2016	Harriett Baldwin MP (Conservative)	West Worcestershire	→	Simon Kirby MP (Conservative)	Brighton Kemptown	Hansard
31 October 2016	Stewart Jackson MP (Conservative)	Peterborough	→	Charlie Elphicke MP (Conservative)	Dover	Hansard
31 October 2016	David Mowat MP (Conservative)	Brighton Kemptown	→	Kwasi Kwarteng MP (Conservative)	Spelthorne	Hansard
4 November 2016	Stephen Phillips MP (Conservative)	Sleaford and North Hykeham	→	Vacant		Resignation of member from Parliament
28 November 2016	Vacant		→	Anne Marie Morris MP (Conservative)	Newton Abbot	Hansard

== 2010–2015 Parliament ==
The chair was elected on 10 June 2010, with members being announced on 12 July 2010.

Member	Party	Constituency
Margaret Hodge MP (chair)	Labour	Barking
Richard Bacon MP	Conservative	South Norfolk
Steve Barclay MP	Conservative	North East Cambridgeshire
Jackie Doyle-Price MP	Conservative	Thurrock
Justine Greening MP	Conservative	Putney
Matt Hancock MP	Conservative	West Suffolk
Chris Heaton-Harris MP	Conservative	Daventry
Jo Johnson MP	Conservative	Orpington
Eric Joyce MP	Labour	Falkirk
Anne McGuire MP	Labour	Stirling
Austin Mitchell MP	Labour	Great Grimsby
Nick Smith MP	Labour	Blaenau Gwent
Ian Swales MP	Liberal Democrats	Redcar
James Wharton MP	Conservative	Stockton South

=== Changes 2010–2015 ===
Date	Outgoing Member & Party	Constituency	→	New Member & Party	Constituency	Source
2 November 2010	Eric Joyce MP (Labour)	Falkirk	→	Stella Creasy MP (Labour)	Walthamstow	Hansard
24 October 2011	Stella Creasy MP (Labour)	Walthamstow	→	Meg Hillier MP (Labour)	Hackney South and Shoreditch	Hansard
24 October 2011	Anne McGuire MP (Labour)	Stirling	→	Fiona Mactaggart MP (Labour)	Slough	Hansard
31 October 2011	Justine Greening MP (Conservative)	Putney	→	Chloe Smith MP (Conservative)	Norwich North	Hansard
27 February 2012	Jo Johnson MP (Conservative)	Orpington	→	Stewart Jackson MP (Conservative)	Peterborough	Hansard
4 September 2012	Chloe Smith MP (Conservative)	Norwich North	→	Sajid Javid MP (Conservative)	Bromsgrove	
12 November 2012	Matt Hancock MP (Conservative)	West Suffolk	→	Guto Bebb MP (Conservative)	Aberconwy	Hansard
12 November 2012	James Wharton MP (Conservative)	Stockton South	→	Justin Tomlinson MP (Conservative)	North Swindon	Hansard
25 November 2013	Sajid Javid MP (Conservative)	Bromsgrove	→	Nicky Morgan MP (Conservative)	Loughborough	Hansard
7 April 2014	Fiona Mactaggart MP (Labour)	Slough	→	Anne McGuire MP (Labour)	Stirling	Hansard
12 May 2014	Nicky Morgan MP (Conservative)	Loughborough	→	Andrea Leadsom MP (Conservative)	South Northamptonshire	Hansard
23 June 2014	Steve Barclay MP (Conservative)	North East Cambridgeshire	→	David Burrowes MP (Conservative)	Enfield Southgate	Hansard
30 June 2014	Ian Swales MP (Liberal Democrats)	Redcar	→	John Pugh MP (Liberal Democrats)	Southport	Hansard
8 September 2014	Justin Tomlinson MP (Conservative)	North Swindon	→	Stephen Phillips MP (Conservative)	Sleaford and North Hykeham	Hansard
8 December 2014	Jackie Doyle-Price MP (Conservative)	Thurrock	→	Stephen Hammond MP (Conservative)	Wimbledon	Hansard

== See also ==
- Parliamentary committees of the United Kingdom
