= Doncaster East and the Isle of Axholme =

UK Parliament constituency (since 2024)

Coordinates: 53.57°N 0.88°W

- County constituency for the House of Commons
- Interactive map of boundaries from 2024
- Boundary of Doncaster East and the Isle of Axholme in Yorkshire and the Humber
- County: South Yorkshire and North Lincolnshire
- Electorate: 70,113
- Major settlements: Bawtry; Hatfield; Thorne; Rossington; Auckley; Epworth; Haxey; Crowle

Current constituency
- Created: 2024
- Member of Parliament: Lee Pitcher (Labour)
- Seats: One
- Created from: Brigg & Goole; Don Valley; Doncaster North

Doncaster East and the Isle of Axholme is a constituency of the House of Commons in the UK Parliament. Further to the completion of the 2023 review of Westminster constituencies, it was first contested at the 2024 general election, since when it has been represented by Lee Pitcher of the Labour Party.

The seat covers eastern areas of Doncaster in South Yorkshire and the Isle of Axholme in North Lincolnshire.

== Constituency profile ==
Doncaster East and the Isle of Axholme is a mostly rural constituency. The west of the constituency lies within South Yorkshire and contains towns and villages on the outskirts of the city of Doncaster (Rossington, Auckley, Bawtry, Thorne and Hatfield). The east of the constituency is rural and covers the Isle of Axholme in North Lincolnshire, so named because the area was once a raised area of land surrounded by marshes before being drained in the 17th century. This area contains the small towns of Crowle, Epworth and Haxey. There is some deprivation in the towns near Doncaster, whilst the Isle of Axholme is comparatively wealthier. The constituency includes both Yorkshire Wildlife Park and Doncaster Airport.

On average, residents of the constituency are older and more religious than the rest of the country. Household income is similar to national averages whilst levels of education and professional employment are lower. At the 2021 census, White people made up 96% of the population. At the local council level, Bawtry and Rossington are represented by Labour Party councillors, Hatfield and Thorne by Reform UK and Auckley and the Isle of Axholme by Conservatives. In the 2016 referendum on European Union membership, an estimated 68% of voters in the constituency supported Brexit, one of the top 40 highest rates out of 650 constituencies nationwide.

== Boundaries ==
The constituency is composed of the following (as they existed on 1 December 2020):

- The City of Doncaster wards of: Finningley; Hatfield; Rossington & Bawtry; Thorne & Moorends.
- The District of North Lincolnshire wards of Axholme Central; Axholme North; Axholme South.

It comprises the following:

In the City of Doncaster:

- Finningley, Hatfield, Rossington, Bawtry and Thorne from Don Valley (abolished)
- Moorends from Doncaster North

In North Lincolnshire:

- The Isle of Axholme from Brigg and Goole (abolished)

== Members of Parliament ==
Brigg & Goole and Don Valley prior to 2024

Election	Member	Party
2024	Lee Pitcher	Labour

== Elections ==
=== Elections in the 2020s ===
General election 2024: Doncaster East and the Isle of Axholme
Party	Candidate	Votes	%	±%
Labour	Lee Pitcher	15,122	38.6	+9.9
Conservative	Nick Fletcher	12,811	32.7	−19.4
Reform	Irwen Martin	8,487	21.6	+11.4
Green	Paul Garrett	1,400	3.6	+1.2
Liberal Democrats	Nicola Turner	1,166	3.0	−1.4
Climate	Michael John Longfellow	146	0.4	N/A
Majority		2,311	5.9	N/A
Turnout		39,132	55.8	−5.6
Registered electors		70,154		
Labour gain from Conservative		Swing	+14.7	

=== Elections in the 2010s ===
2019 notional result
Party	Vote	%
Conservative	22,460	52.1
Labour	12,375	28.7
Brexit Party	4,452	10.3
Liberal Democrats	1,912	4.4
Green	1,015	2.4
Others	870	2.0
Turnout	43,084	61.4
Electorate	70,113	

== See also ==
- Parliamentary constituencies in South Yorkshire
- Parliamentary constituencies in Humberside
- Parliamentary constituencies in Yorkshire and the Humber
