= Geoffrey Clifton-Brown =

British Conservative politician

Sir Geoffrey Clifton-Brown FRICS MP
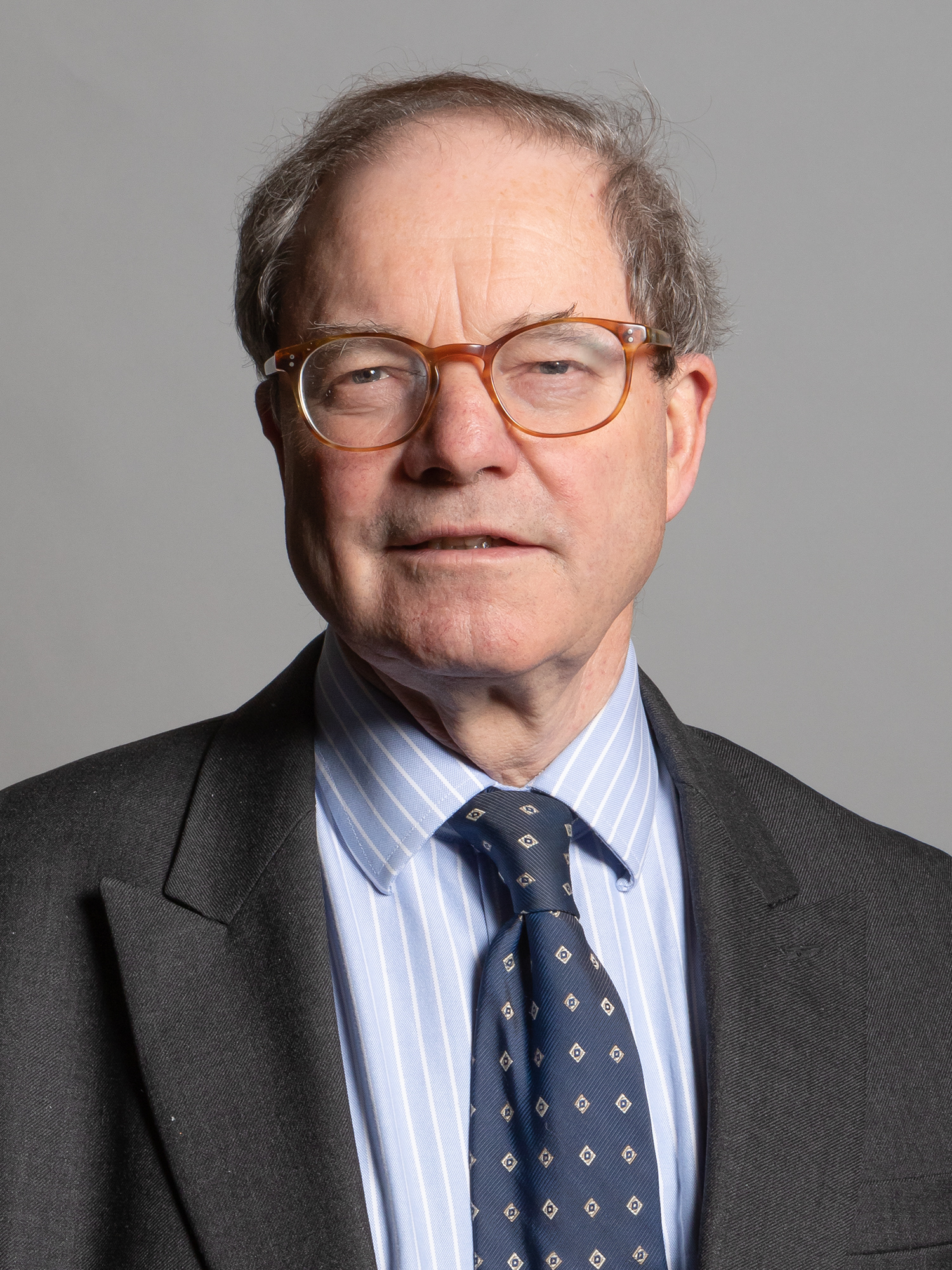
- Official portrait, 2020

Chair of the Public Accounts Committee
- Incumbent
- Assumed office 11 September 2024
- Preceded by: Meg Hillier

Member of Parliament
- Incumbent
- Assumed office 9 April 1992
- Preceded by: Nicholas Ridley
- Constituency: Cirencester and Tewkesbury (1992–1997); Cotswold (1997–2010); The Cotswolds (2010–2024); North Cotswolds (2024–present)
- Majority: 3,357 (6.6%)

Personal details
- Born: 23 March 1953 (age 73) Cambridge, England
- Party: Conservative
- Spouse: Alexandra Peto-Shepherd (m. 1979; div. 2004)
- Relations: Douglas Clifton Brown, 1st Viscount Ruffside (great-granduncle); Sir Alexander Brown, 1st Baronet (great-great-granduncle); Sir William Brown, 1st Baronet, of Richmond Hill (great-great-great-grandfather); Tom Hiddleston (distant cousin)
- Children: Jacqueline, Edward
- Education: Royal Agricultural College
- Profession: Politician and Surveyor
- Website: cliftonbrown.co.uk

Sir Geoffrey Robert Clifton-Brown (born 23 March 1953) is a British Conservative Party politician who has served as a Member of Parliament (MP) since 1992. He has represented North Cotswolds since the 2024 general election, having previously represented Cirencester and Tewkesbury, then The Cotswolds.

== Early life and career ==
Geoffrey Clifton-Brown was born on 23 March 1953 in Cambridge, the eldest of four children of farmer Robert Lawrence Clifton-Brown (1929–2016), of Maltings Farmhouse, Haverhill, Suffolk, a councillor and mayor of St Edmundsbury, Suffolk, and (Florence) Elizabeth Lindsay (1926–2006), granddaughter of Sir Edmund Hoyle Vestey, 1st Baronet. Clifton-Brown is therefore distantly related to the actor Tom Hiddleston, who is Edmund Vestey's great-great-grandson.

He was privately educated, first at Tormore School in Deal, Kent, and then at Eton College. He then studied at the Royal Agricultural College where he qualified as a chartered surveyor in 1975. He began his career as a graduate estate surveyor at the Property Services Agency in Dorchester and, later in 1975, became an investment surveyor with Jones Lang Wootton. He became the vice chairman of the Norfolk North Conservative Association in 1984. He was elected as Constituency Chairman in 1986, a position he held until he resigned in 1991 in order to stand for election as a Conservative candidate.

== Parliamentary career ==
During 1991, Clifton-Brown was selected as the candidate for the then Conservative parliamentary constituency of Cirencester and Tewkesbury, following the retirement of the former Cabinet minister Nicholas Ridley. He won the seat at the 1992 general election with 55.6% of the vote and a majority of 16,058, both slightly higher than at the 1987 general election. Clifton-Brown made his maiden speech on 12 June 1992.

When newly elected Clifton-Brown became a member of the Environment Select Committee, where he remained until 1995. He was then appointed as the Parliamentary private secretary to Douglas Hogg, the Minister of Agriculture, Fisheries and Food.

The constituency of Cirencester and Tewkesbury was abolished, but Clifton-Brown contested and was elected for the newly drawn constituency of Cotswold at the 1997 general election. He won with 46.4% of the vote, a decrease of 8% from 1992, and a majority of 11,965, down from 16,058. (Note: Percentage change and swing for 1997 is calculated relative to the Rallings and Thrasher 1992 notional constituency result, not actual 1992 result. See C. Rallings & M. Thrasher, The Media Guide to the New Parliamentary Constituencies (Plymouth: LGC Elections Centre, 1995)) He was again re-elected at the 2001 general election with an increased vote share of 50.3% and an increased majority of 11,983.

In 2002, after Iain Duncan Smith became leader of the Conservative party, Clifton-Brown became the Shadow Minister for Local and Devolved Government Affairs.

Clifton-Brown was re-elected at the 2005 general election with a decreased vote share of 49.3% and a decreased majority of 9,688. He returned to Westminster as assistant Chief Conservative Whip. On the accession of David Cameron as Leader of the Conservative Party, he was appointed the Shadow Minister for Foreign Affairs, Trade and Investment.

During the parliamentary expenses scandal in 2009, Clifton-Brown switched his main residence from his house in the Cotswolds to a London flat. The Cotswolds Conservative Party Association said that Clifton-Brown had acted within the rules.

Clifton-Brown was again re-elected at the 2010 general election, increasing his vote share to 53% and his majority to 12,864. Following the formation of the subsequent coalition government, he returned as a backbencher, making overseas visits in his role as Chairman of the Conservative Party's International Office. At this time he became the Parliamentary Chairman of the Conservative Friends of the Chinese. In 2014, he received critical attention in the media following a visit to China paid for by the Chinese authorities. In a 2015 interview with CNN, Clifton-Brown stated that his family has been doing business in China since the 1920s. Clifton-Brown has remained engaged with the Chinese authorities.

Clifton-Brown was again re-elected at the 2015 general election with an increased vote share of 56.5% and an increased majority of 21,477. He was again re-elected at the snap 2017 general election with an increased vote share of 60.1% and an increased majority of 25,499.

In the 2018 New Year Honours, he was appointed a Knight Bachelor for political and public service.

In 2019, Clifton-Brown was asked to leave the Conservative Party Conference being held in Manchester, following a dispute with security staff who prevented him from entering a meeting room with a guest who did not have a relevant identification pass. He later apologised and described the incident as a "minor verbal misunderstanding".

He was again re-elected at the 2019 general election, with a decreased vote share of 58% and a decreased majority of 20,214.

He has previously been voted as the worst MP in parliament in a survey of constituents ranking MPs on categories such as attendance and helping constituents.

Due to the 2023 review of Westminster constituencies, Clifton-Brown's constituency of The Cotswolds was abolished, and replaced with North Cotswolds. At the 2024 general election, Clifton-Brown was elected to Parliament as MP for North Cotswolds with 34.7% of the vote and a majority of 3,357. Following the general election, he ran against Bob Blackman to become chairman of the 1922 Committee, of which he had previously been treasurer; he lost by 28 votes.

On 11 September 2024, Clifton-Brown was elected Chair of the Public Accounts Committee.

== Personal life ==
In 1979, Clifton-Brown married Alexandra, daughter of Wing Commander Denis Noel Peto-Shepherd, RAF. They have one son and one daughter. They divorced in 2004. He is now married to Kym Clifton-Brown. He is a Freeman of the City of London.

Clifton-Brown is related to seven other previous members of Parliament, including his grandfather Geoffrey Benedict Clifton-Brown, his great-uncle Douglas Clifton Brown, and Douglas' son-in-law Harry Hylton-Foster (husband of Audrey Clifton-Brown). Both Douglas and Harry became Speaker of the House of Commons. Sir Geoffrey Clifton-Brown's great-uncle Howard Clifton Brown was elected as member of Parliament on several occasions. He is also a descendant of the Army officer and MP James Clifton Brown, and of Sir William Brown, 1st Baronet, a Liberal MP and the co-founder of banking house Brown Shipley.

== Notes ==
Parliament of the United Kingdom
Preceded by Nicholas Ridley	Member of Parliament for Cirencester and Tewkesbury; 1992–1997	Constituency abolished
New constituency	Member of Parliament for The Cotswolds; 1997–2024	Constituency abolished
New constituency	Member of Parliament for North Cotswolds; 2024–present	Incumbent
Political offices
Preceded by Meg Hillier	Chair of the Public Accounts Committee; 2024–present	Incumbent
