= John Chalmers (trade unionist) =

Scottish trade unionist (1915-1983)

John Chalmers CBE (16 May 1915 – 19 August 1983) was a Scottish trade unionist.

== Life ==
Born in Clydebank, Chalmers studied at the Clydebank Secondary School before working as a plater. He joined the Boilermakers Society, and became a full-time official in 1954. Long active in the Labour Party, he spent ten years on Clydebank Town Council.

Chalmers became assistant general secretary of the Boilermakers in 1961 and, in 1967, he became general secretary of the union, now known as the "Amalgamated Society of Boilermakers, Shipwrights, Blacksmiths and Structural Workers", while fellow Clydebanker Danny McGarvey became president. That year, he also joined the National Executive Committee of the Labour Party, and he was chairman of the party in 1976/77.

McGarvey died suddenly in 1977, and Chalmers took McGarvey's place on the General Council of the Trades Union Congress (TUC). Chalmers also served on the Central Arbitration Committee from 1976. In 1978, he was made a Commander of the Order of the British Empire. He stood down from his trade union posts in 1980, but served on the Press Council from 1978 until 1981.

Trade union offices
Preceded by Danny McGarvey	General Secretary of the Amalgamated Society of Boilermakers, Shipwrights, Blacksmiths and Structural Workers; 1967–1980	Succeeded by Jim Murray
Preceded by Danny McGarvey	Shipbuilding Group representative on the General Council of the TUC; 1977–1980	Succeeded by Jim Murray
Party political offices
Preceded by Tom Bradley	Chair of the Labour Party; 1976-1977	Succeeded by Joan Lestor
