= Jim Murray (trade unionist) =

Scottish trade unionist (died 2006)

James G. Murray (died 2006) was a Scottish trade unionist. He became the leader of his union and organised its merger into the GMB, but his time in office was overshadowed by allegations of vote-rigging which were later withdrawn.

Born in Glasgow, Murray completed an apprenticeship as a boilermaker with Babcock & Wilcox. During World War II, he served in the Royal Navy as an engine room artificer. After the war, he returned to the Clyde, spending time in engineering and shipbuilding before returning to boilermaking and joining the United Society of Boilermakers (USB).

Murray became increasingly active in the USB, initially as a lay official, then from 1962 as a full-time district delegate. He was also elected to the union's executive committee, and spent a period as its chair.

In 1980, Murray stood to become general secretary of the union, by then known as the Amalgamated Society of Boilermakers, Shipwrights, Blacksmiths and Structural Workers. He topped the first poll, then beat leading communist Barry Williams 1,831 to 1,435 in a run-off. He took up office and was also elected to the General Council of the Trades Union Congress, but Williams took legal action, claiming that the election had been rigged, and he should be declared the winner. The union's executive investigated, and discovered that some ballots, marked for both candidates, had been forged. As a result, it suspended Murray, appointing Sandy Scott as acting general secretary, while the run-off was held again.

On a re-vote, Murray again won election, this time beating Williams by 2,349 votes to 1,970. Williams again took legal action, but a further executive investigation found no issues, and Murray took up the post in October. He completed merger negotiations with the General and Municipal Workers' Union, and in December the USB became part of the General, Municipal, Boilermakers and Allied Trades Union (GMBATU). Murray was appointed as the secretary of the GMBATU's new boilermakers' section.

Williams finally withdrew his legal action in February 1984, despite which he never believed he had lost to Murray. Murray, having found the situation stressful, retired at the end of the year. He died in 2006.

Trade union offices
Preceded by John Chalmers	General Secretary of the Amalgamated Society of Boilermakers, Shipwrights, Blacksmiths and Structural Workers; 1980–1982	Succeeded by Position abolished
Preceded by New position	Secretary of the Boilermakers Section of the General, Municipal, Boilermakers and Allied Trades Union; 1982–1984	Succeeded by Jim McFall
Preceded by John Chalmers	Shipbuilding Group member of the General Council of the Trades Union Congress; 1980–1983	Succeeded by Council reorganised
