= Tom Williams, Baron Williams of Barnburgh =

British coal miner and Labour Party politician

The Right Honourable The Lord Williams of Barnburgh PC
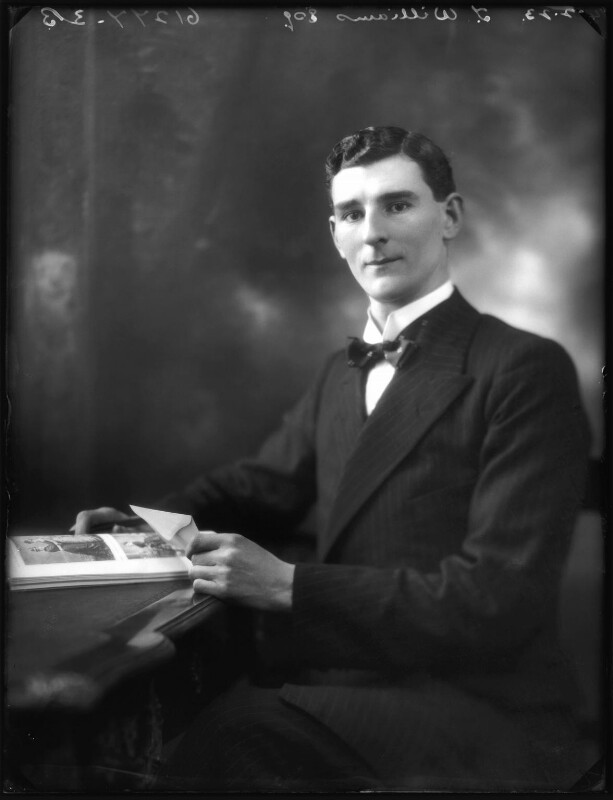

Minister of Agriculture and Fisheries
- In office August 1945 – October 1951
- Monarch: George VI
- Prime Minister: Clement Attlee
- Preceded by: Robert Hudson
- Succeeded by: Sir Thomas Dugdale

Parliamentary Secretary to the Ministry of Agriculture and Fisheries
- In office May 1940 – May 1945
- Monarch: George VI
- Prime Minister: Winston Churchill

Member of the House of Lords
- Lord Temporal
- Life peerage February 1961 – March 1967

Member of Parliament for Don Valley
- In office November 1922 – September 1959
- Preceded by: James Walton
- Succeeded by: Richard Kelley

Personal details
- Born: Thomas Williams; 18 March 1888 Blackwell, Derbyshire, England
- Died: 29 March 1967 (aged 79) Doncaster, West Riding of Yorkshire, England
- Party: Labour
- Other political affiliations: Independent Labour Party; British Socialist Party
- Spouse: Elizabeth Andrews (m. 1910)
- Children: 2
- Occupation: Coal miner, checkweigher, trade unionist, politician

Thomas Williams, Baron Williams of Barnburgh, PC (18 March 1888 – 29 March 1967) was a British coal miner who became a Labour Party politician.

== Career ==
Born in Blackwell, Derbyshire, Williams grew up in Swinton in Yorkshire, and began work in 1899 in Kilnhurst colliery. He became involved in trade unionism and joined the Independent Labour Party, switching briefly to the British Socialist Party during World War I before joining the Labour Party. In 1918, he was elected as a Labour member of the Bolton-upon-Dearne Urban District Council.

He was elected at the 1922 general election as the Member of Parliament (MP) for Don Valley, and held the seat until he stepped down at the 1959 general election.

=== In Parliament ===
In the First Labour Government, from January to October 1924, Williams was Parliamentary Private Secretary (PPS) to Noel Buxton, the Minister of Agriculture. In the Second Labour Government from 1929 to 1931, he was PPS to the Minister of Labour, Margaret Bondfield.

Williams first held ministerial office in Winston Churchill's wartime Coalition Government, when he was Parliamentary Secretary to the Ministry of Agriculture and Fisheries from 1940 to 1945, serving under the Conservative minister Robert Hudson. He was made a Privy Counsellor in August 1941. In Clement Attlee's post-war Labour government, he was Minister of Agriculture, Fisheries and Food from 1945 to 1951, most notably steering the Agriculture Act 1947 through the House of Commons. After Labour lost the 1951 general election he was the opposition spokesperson on Agriculture until 1959.

Following his retirement from the House of Commons in 1959, he was created a life peer on 2 February 1961 taking the title Baron Williams of Barnburgh, of Barnburgh in the West Riding of the County of York.

His autobiography, in which he gives an account of his life since childhood, was published in 1965 with a foreword by Clement Attlee.

Parliament of the United Kingdom
Preceded by James Walton	Member of Parliament for Don Valley; 1922–1959	Succeeded by Richard Kelley
Political offices
Preceded by The Lord Denham	Parliamentary Secretary to the Ministry of Agriculture and Fisheries (with The Lord Moyne, to 1941; The Duke of Norfolk), 1941–1945; 1940–1945	Succeeded by The Duke of Norfolk and Donald Scott
Preceded by Robert Hudson	Minister of Agriculture and Fisheries; 1945–1951	Succeeded by Thomas Dugdale
