= Danny McGarvey =

Scottish trade unionist (1919–1977)

Sir Danny McGarvey CBE

Personal details
- Born: September 16, 1919 Clydebank, Scotland
- Died: April 26, 1977 (aged 57)
- Occupation: Trade unionist; former apprentice caulker

Sir Daniel McGarvey, CBE (16 September 1919 – 26 April 1977) was a Scottish trade unionist.

McGarvey was born in Clydebank and attended Our Holy Redeemer School, then St Patrick's High School, Dumbarton. At the age of fifteen, he began working as an apprentice caulker.

He became active in the United Society of Boilermakers and Iron and Steel Shipbuilders, being elected to its general council in 1951, and in 1954 to the executive council of the Confederation of Shipbuilding and Engineering Unions. From 1958 to 1965, he served on the National Executive Council of the Labour Party. In 1964, he was elected as General Secretary of the renamed Amalgamated Society of Boilermakers, Shipwrights, Blacksmiths and Structural Workers.

In 1965, he was elected to the General Council of the Trades Union Congress (TUC), and he became the President of the TUC in 1976, but died the following April, before completing his term.

== Honours ==
McGarvey received the CBE in 1970, and was knighted shortly before his death.

Trade union offices
Preceded by Ted Hill	General Secretary of the Amalgamated Society of Boilermakers, Shipwrights, Blacksmiths and Structural Workers; 1965–1967	Succeeded by John Chalmers
Preceded by Ted Hill	Shipbuilding Group representative on the General Council of the TUC; 1965–1977	Succeeded by John Chalmers
Preceded by Walter Anderson and Ronald Rigby	Trades Union Congress representative to the AFL-CIO; 1975; With: Martin Redmond	Succeeded by Len Edmondson and Cyril Plant
Preceded by Cyril Plant	President of the Trades Union Congress; 1976–1977	Succeeded by Marie Patterson
