= Walter Anderson (trade unionist) =

Walter Charles Anderson CBE (3 December 1910 – 1 March 1995) was a British trade union official.

Born in Bootle, Anderson's father was a solicitor but died while he was still young. His father's former partner supported the young Walter in attending the University of Liverpool, where he too qualified as a solicitor. He worked for another legal firm while he was at university; when he qualified, in 1933, he was sacked on the grounds that the firm thought he would expect a wage increase. Anderson instead found employment for Bootle Town Council, then moved to become a deputy town clerk in Heywood.

In 1937, Anderson found work as an assistant solicitor for the National Association of Local Government Officers (NALGO). He served with the Royal Air Force during World War II then, on his return, became NALGO's legal officer. In 1950, he was promoted to become deputy general secretary of the union, and in 1957 he was elected as the union's general secretary.

On election, Anderson immediately found the union at the centre of a battle in the National Health Service (NHS); although the independent Whitley Council had agreed a 3% pay increase for low-paid staff, the Conservative Party government overruled this: an unprecedented situation. Although NALGO represented only 5% of NHS workers, Anderson co-ordinated all the relevant trade unions, which implemented an overtime ban. This was to apply only insofar as it did not affect patients, and this move secured public support. Ultimately, a compromise was achieved in which low-paid staff would receive higher increases, of between 9 and 60%, but these were backdated only to July 1958, not the start of the dispute.

In 1965, Anderson convinced NALGO to affiliate to the Trades Union Congress (TUC). He was immediately elected to the General Council of the TUC, and focused much time on raising the union's profile; it became the largest white-collar union in the world. In 1968, he was made a Commander of the Order of the British Empire.

Anderson retired from his union posts in 1973, but took up work at the London School of Economics, on the Independent Broadcasting Authority, and on the Fulton Committee into working conditions in the civil service. In his spare time, he was a keen supporter of Liverpool F.C. and a fan of cricket.

Trade union offices
Preceded by Haden Corser	Deputy General Secretary of the National Association of Local Government Officers; 1950–1957	Succeeded by Geoffrey Drain
Preceded by John Warren	General Secretary of the National Association of Local Government Officers; 1957–1973	Succeeded by Geoffrey Drain
Preceded by Cyril Plant and Hugh Scanlon	Trades Union Congress representative to the AFL–CIO; 1973; With: Ronald Rigby	Succeeded by Danny McGarvey and Martin Redmond
