= Cyril Plant =

British trade unionist

Cyril Thomas Howe Plant, Baron Plant, CBE (27 August 1910 – 9 August 1986) was a British trade unionist.

Born in Leek, Staffordshire, he worked as a sorting clerk in the Post Office and spent a lot of time playing football, later becoming a referee.

In 1934, he joined the Inland Revenue and became a founding member of the Inland Revenue Staff Federation, and was elected to its executive. In 1944, he became the union's full-time assistant secretary, then deputy secretary, before becoming its general secretary in 1960.

He was elected to the General Council of the Trades Union Congress (TUC) in 1964, and was its President in 1976. He was active in the International Labour Office, and served on its governing body from 1969 to 1977. He served on the Community Relations Commission, the Monopolies and Mergers Commission, as Treasurer of the Workers' Educational Association and Chairman of the Governors of Ruskin College, Oxford. Plant retired from his union posts in 1977 and became an advisor to the Police Federation.

Plant was appointed an Officer of the Order of the British Empire (OBE) in the 1965 Birthday Honours and promoted to a Commander (CBE) in the 1975 Birthday Honours. On 9 May 1978, he was created a life peer taking the title Baron Plant, of Benenden in the County of Kent.

Coat of arms of Cyril Plant

Crest
A patriarchal cross Gules thereon a silkworm and moth Proper.
Escutcheon
Gules on a chevron between in chief two horses rampant and in base a Stafford knot argent three patriarchal crosses Gules a border compony counter compony Argent and Sable.
Supporters
Dexter an angel Proper vested Argent winged Or, sinister a horse Argent maned crined and unguled Or.
Motto
Labor Et Fors

Trade union offices
New post	Treasurer of the London Trades Council; 1952–1974	Council dissolved
Preceded by Douglas Houghton	General Secretary of the Inland Revenue Staff Federation; 1960–1976	Succeeded by Tony Christopher
Preceded by George Smith and Sidney Greene	Trades Union Congress representative to the AFL-CIO; 1971; With: Hugh Scanlon	Succeeded by Walter Anderson and Ronald Rigby
Preceded by Marie Patterson	President of the Trades Union Congress; 1976	Succeeded by Danny McGarvey
Preceded by Danny McGarvey and Martin Redmond	Trades Union Congress representative to the AFL-CIO; 1977; With: L. F. Edmondson	Succeeded by Alfred Allen
