= Barry Williams (politician) =

British politician and trade union politician (1928–2005)

Alfred Barry Williams (7 February 1928 – 6 August 2005) was a British boilermaker, trade union official, and Communist politician in the United Kingdom.

== Life ==
He was one of three children of Elizabeth and Alfred John Williams; his father was also a boilermaker. He was the first of three children, born on 7 February 1928 in Liverpool, Lancashire (now Merseyside), England. He grew up in Liverpool and served an apprenticeship as a boilermaker at the firm of Francis Morton & Co. Engineers in Garston, Liverpool, England.

Williams was drafted for National Service in the British Army's RAMC in 1946 and was posted to Palestine as part of the force administering the British Mandate. On returning to the UK he worked for various employers including shipbuilders and repairers Grayson Rollo and Clover and Cammell Laird and the Mersey Docks and Harbour Board as a plater, a sub-division of boilermaker trade. Williams was proud of having been one of the "few platers to have been sacked by the MDHB" for acting in solidarity with labourers who had been accused of leaving a worksite while being paid.

He was a leading figure in the UK labour movement in the second half of the 20th century, twice running for general secretary of the Boilermakers' Society against Jim Murray in highly contentious elections. He was elected vice president of the Liverpool Trades Council in 1970, later becoming its president. Williams also came up with the idea for the 1981 People's March for Jobs from Liverpool to London. He was also elected to the national executive of the Communist Party of Great Britain, representing it at the founding congress of the Workers Party of Ethiopia in 1984 where he delivered a speech on the party's behalf.

Williams stood as the Communist Party candidate in the 1965 Liverpool Borough Council Elections, in the Childwall Ward, polling only 74 votes, or one percent. The following year he stood as the Communist Candidate in the Birkenhead constituency in the United Kingdom General Election. He achieved only 1.5 per cent of the vote. He saw these acts as important to the political process despite openly acknowledging that his candidacy was unlikely to result in a seat in Parliament. He stood again in Birkenhead in the 1970 general election for the Communist Party, achieving 0.6 per cent of the vote. As well as his political activity for the CPGB, he also wrote football reports on Everton FC for the Morning Star under the nom de plume "Bill Morton".

Barry Williams died in Wrexham, North Wales, on 6 August 2005. He was 77.
