= James Walton (MP for Don Valley) =

British miner, trade unionist and politician

James Walton (7 September 1867 – 26 January 1924) was a British miner, trade unionist and politician who served as the Member of Parliament (MP) for Don Valley in Yorkshire from 1918 to 1922.

== Background ==
He was educated at Broomhill Board Schools. In 1889 he married the daughter of William Jackson.

== Career ==
He started work as a miner. In 1881, he joined the recently founded Yorkshire Miners' Association (YMA) at the age of 13. He was the Secretary of Mexborough Trades council. He was a Delegate of the Yorkshire Miners’ Association. He was a supporter of the Liberal party. In 1914 he applied, along with others to contract out of paying a political levy to the Labour party in accordance with the terms of the Trade Union Act 1913. However, his efforts were frustrated by the YMA, whose executive was now controlled by active members of the Labour party. During World War One he publicly called upon the Yorkshire Miners not to take any strike action while the war was going on. This action resulted in a further falling out between himself and the YMA executive. Walton joined the newly founded National Democratic and Labour Party (NDP) which supported David Lloyd George's coalition government. He was elected at the 1918 general election as the Member of Parliament (MP) for Don Valley;

General election 1918: Don Valley Electorate
Party	Candidate	Votes	%	±%
Coalition National Democratic	James Walton	6,095	46.2	n/a
Liberal	Hastings Lees-Smith	3,868	29.3	n/a
Labour	Edward Hough	3,226	24.5	n/a
Majority		2,227	16.9	n/a
Turnout			45.9	n/a
Coalition National Democratic win				

On entering the House of Commons he brought with him 40 years of experience as a working miner. Early in 1919 when the YMA called for strike action he publicly opposed the call. In May 1919 the YMA Executive succeeded in getting the YMA Council to vote (by a card vote) to expel Walton from membership. In 1920 he supported the Coalition government proposal to establish a Ministry of Mines. He decided to take the YMA to court for expelling him from membership and in March 1921, the judge found in his favour, stating that the YMA by depriving him of his rights and privileges, were in breach of their own rules. In May 1922 he supported the Coalition government Bill to amend the Trade Union Act 1913 to make Unions ballot their members more about party political donations. He had become convinced that the political opt-out measures did not work and that something stronger was required. However, the bill was not given sufficient time to be passed into law. The NDP broke up in 1922 when its leader George Nicoll Barnes retired from Parliament, and along with the remaining other NDP MPs Walton joined the National Liberal Party. He contested that year's general election as a National Liberal, but was heavily defeated by the Labour Party candidate Tom Williams and did not stand for Parliament again;

General election 1922: Don Valley Electorate
Party	Candidate	Votes	%	±%
Labour	Tom Williams	9,903	47.0	+22.5
National Liberal	James Walton	5,793	27.6	−18.6
Liberal	John Henry Freeborough	5,332	25.4	−3.9
Majority		4,106	19.4	36.3
Turnout			65.4	+19.5
Labour gain from National Democratic		Swing	+20.5	

Parliament of the United Kingdom
New constituency	Member of Parliament for Don Valley; 1918 – 1922	Succeeded by Tom Williams
