= People's March for Jobs =

Protest marches in the UK in the early 1980s

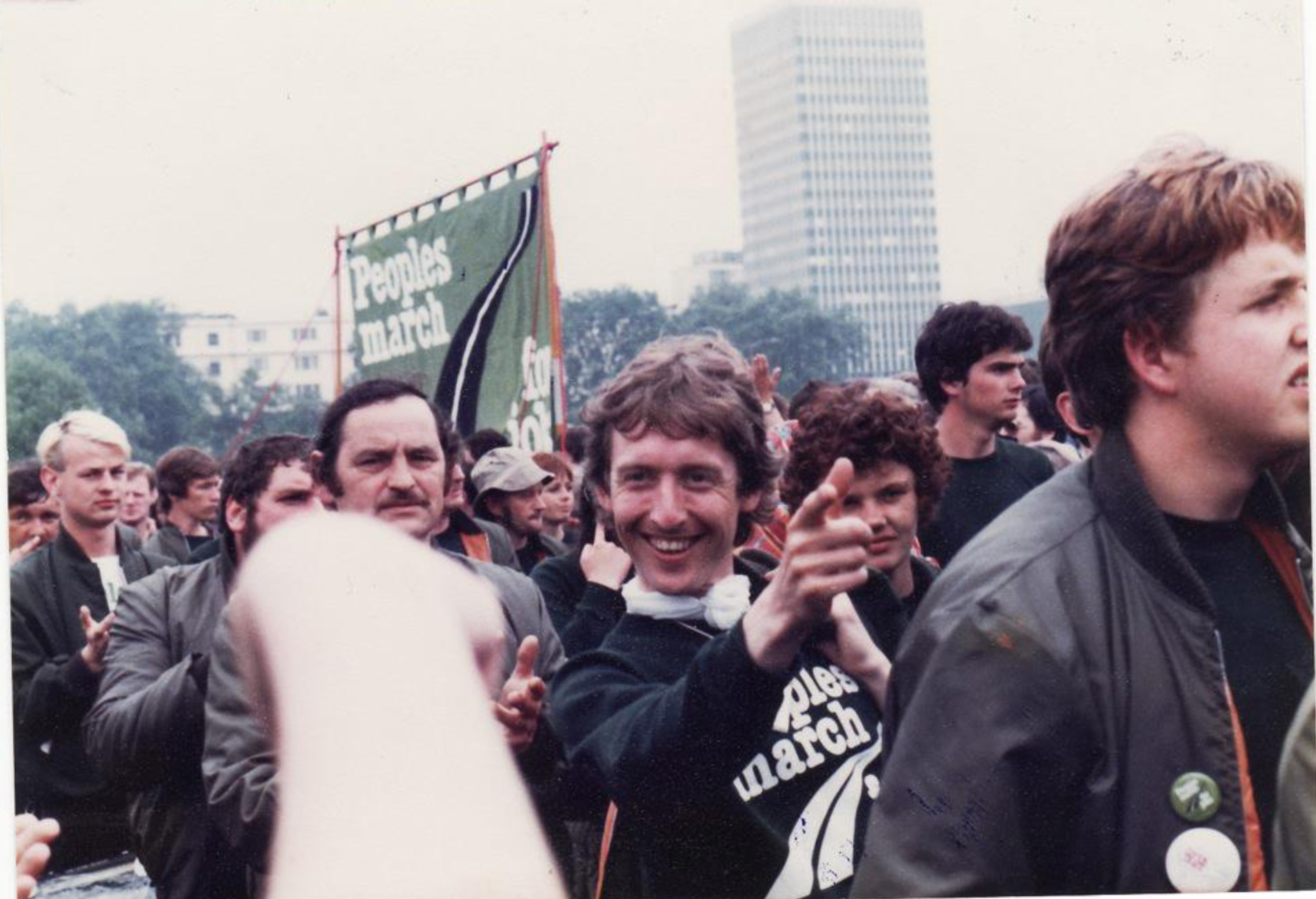

The People's March for Jobs is the name for two different marches in protest against high unemployment in the United Kingdom. The first began on 1 May 1981; the second on 23 April 1983.

== 1981 ==
The first march started in Huddersfield and joined up with a contingent from Liverpool at the Pier Head when 500 unemployed people marched 280 miles to London. This was preceded by an ecumenical service in Liverpool's parish church. A joint statement in support of the march was issued by the Anglican Bishop of Liverpool, David Sheppard, the Catholic Archbishop of Liverpool, Derek Worlock, and leading members of the Methodists, the United Reformed Church, the Baptist Union and the Salvation Army.

The march, which drew comparisons with the Jarrow March of 1936, cost £70,000, with 500 marchers being estimated as the most that the organisers could afford to adequately clothe and feed. The idea of holding the march was proposed to the North West Committee of the Trades Union Congress by Boilermakers Society official Barry Williams, who was also president of the Liverpool Trades Council. The co-ordinators of the march were Jack Dromey, Colin Barnett and Pete Carter, all of the Trades Union Congress.

The march ended on 1 June with a rally outside the Greater London Council, a lobby to Parliament and a party in the evening, before the 500 unemployed dispersed. The marchers handed the government a petition with 250,000 signatures calling on the government to change its policies to ensure full employment. Paul Routledge, Christopher Warman and Richard Evans in The Times claimed that the labour movement regarded the march as its biggest propaganda success since Margaret Thatcher had become prime minister.

The 1981 March forms the backdrop and inspiration for All Together Now, a tribute by Pete Carter's son, Mike, to his father and the March.

== 1983 ==
The second People's March for Jobs began in Glasgow on 23 April 1983. On 5 June between 15,000 and 20,000 people attended a rally in Hyde Park, London, to mark the end of the march, addressed by Labour leader Michael Foot and the general secretary of the TUC, Len Murray. However, this figure was considerably less than the 250,000 for which the organisers of the march had hoped.
