= Richard Kelley =

British trade unionist and left-wing Labour Party politician

Member of Parliament for Don Valley
- In office 8 October 1959 – 7 April 1979
- Preceded by: Thomas Williams
- Succeeded by: Michael Welsh

Personal details
- Born: 24 July 1904
- Died: April 1984 (aged 79)
- Party: Labour

Richard Kelley (24 July 1904 – April 1984) was a British trade unionist and left-wing Labour Party politician from the coal mining area of Doncaster. He was the Member of Parliament (MP) for Don Valley from 1959 to 1979.

== Career ==
Kelley was a miners' union secretary in Doncaster for 10 years, where he joined with National Coal Board managers in opposition to miners who wanted to leave work early when their work was complete, fearing that it could lead to miners hurrying their work and ignoring safety precautions. He also served as a councillor on the West Riding of Yorkshire County council from 1949 to 1959.

At the time of his candidacy for Parliament, the NUM's leadership in Yorkshire tried to prevent left-wingers from becoming sponsored miners' MPs and most MPs in NUM-dominated seats were on the right of the Labour Party. Richard Kelley was able to secure election because the collieries in the Don Valley were considerably more militant than in the rest of Yorkshire and built an independent power base around his candidacy.

He was elected at the 1959 general election as the MP for Don Valley, and held the seat at five further general elections until he retired from the House of Commons at the 1979 general election. Kelley was sponsored by the National Union of Mineworkers (NUM), and was one of the MPs affected by a decision in 1977 of the Yorkshire area of the NUM to seek the retirement at age 65 of all MPs sponsored by mining unions.

=== In Parliament ===
In February 1961, the German Democratic Republic's news agency ADN reported that Kelley had been "harassed", "threatened" and then arrested by police in West Berlin whilst visiting the city in connection with his attendance at a conference for coexistence and disarmament in Warsaw. The West Berlin authorities dismissed the claims, describing the incident as "trivial". In June of that year, Kelley's son Jack, then aged 23, was fined £1 for painting the slogan "ban the bomb" on a bus shelter near Doncaster, but said "it has nothing to do with my father".

Kelley opposed the Vietnam War. In March 1967 he signed an advertisement in The Times calling on the government of the United Kingdom to "dissociate itself explicitly from the bombing of North Vietnam", and in April that year he was one of 59 Labour MPs to vote against the Labour government in a Commons motion on the war. He rebelled against the incomes policy of Harold Wilson's government, voting against the government in a division on the report stage of the Prices and Incomes Bill in June 1968, and voted against the government again in a further motion on Vietnam in December 1969.

In November 1976, Kelley was one of 33 Labour MPs denounced by the Social Democratic Alliance (a pressure group on the right of the Labour Party) for their alleged associations with Communist and Trotskyist organisations. The MPs, who included Tony Benn and future leader Michael Foot, were accused by the SDA of being part of a shift in the party "in favour of intolerant Marxist totalitarianism".

Parliament of the United Kingdom
Preceded by Tom Williams	Member of Parliament for Don Valley; 1959–1979	Succeeded by Michael Welsh
