= Len Edmondson =

British trade unionist (1912–2006)

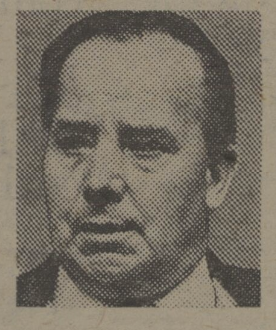
Len Edmondson

Leonard Firby Edmondson (16 December 1912 – 20 November 2006) was a British trade unionist.

Born in Gateshead, Edmondson was educated at Gateshead Central School, leaving at the age of fifteen. After two years of unemployment and short-term work, he completed an apprenticeship as a fitter with the Concrete Liner Company. He joined the Amalgamated Engineering Union (AEU) and worked for a large number of businesses around the Tyne, generally acting as a shop steward. He was considered a highly skilled negotiator, who persuaded companies to introduce apprenticeships for machinists, and limit overtime.

In 1934, Edmondson joined the National Unemployed Workers Movement and, through this, joined the Independent Labour Party (ILP), remaining a member until the late 1940s, and identifying as being on the left wing of the trade union movement. He campaigned in support of the Republicans during the Spanish Civil War, and for maintenance of working conditions during World War II. In 1943, he was elected to the union's Tyneside District Committee, and in 1953 he became the full-time district secretary.

In 1966, Edmondson was elected to the Executive Council (EC) of the AEU, and to the Executive Council of the Confederation of Shipbuilding and Engineering Unions (CSEU). By this time, he took an intermediate position between the hard left and hard right groups at the head of the AEU, and his re-election to the EC in 1969 was reported as the victory for a ‘middle-of the road’ man.

When he stood for the Presidency of the Union in 1967, Edmondson was "the dark horse in the election... a bachelor and a quiet, deep-thinking man... renowned for his complete respect for rules and procedure - in everything he does, the rule book governs'. In the election, Edmondson won 7,865 votes (7.6%), coming fourth in the first ballot.

On some key issues, Edmondson supported Hugh Scanlon and the left, rather than the hard right on the Executive Council. In 1968, he voted with the left to oppose TUC General Secretary George Woodcock’s wage restraint policy – while only John Boyd (trade unionist) and Bill John supported Woodcock’s plan on the Executive.

In May 1974, when the union’s funds were sequestrated over the Con-Mech dispute, Edmondson voted with the left to support the motion, ‘The Executive Council instructs all members of the engineering section without exception to withdraw their labour forthwith’. Scanlon's casting vote was in favour of the all-out national strike, which lasted from late on Tuesday 7 May until the afternoon of Wednesday 8 May.

Edmondson was president of the CSEU in 1976/77. He was also elected to the General Council of the Trades Union Congress in 1970, serving for eight years. In addition, he served on the Shipbuilding Industry Training Board, the council of Acas, the Royal Commission on Legal Services, Council on Tribunals, Gypsy Council, and Committee of Inquiry into Prison Services.

Edmondson retired from his union work in 1977, and from his remaining roles by 1984. He spent his retirement breeding and showing Shetland Sheepdogs, and he also enjoyed attending the Appleby Horse Fair.

Trade union offices
Preceded by Danny McGarvey and Martin Redmond	Trades Union Congress representative to the AFL–CIO; 1977; With: Cyril Plant	Succeeded by Alfred Allen
Preceded by Les Buck	President of the Confederation of Shipbuilding and Engineering Unions; 1976–1977	Succeeded by Marie Patterson
