= John Warren (trade unionist) =

British trade unionist

John Herbert Warren OBE (2 September 1895 – 11 July 1960) was a British trade unionist.

Warren studied at the University of Liverpool before finding work in the clerks' department of Birkenhead Corporation. In 1933, he was promoted to become an assistant solicitor, then served as town clerk in Newton-le-Willows, Lancashire, followed by Slough. From 1933 to 1945, he also worked as a part-time lecturer at the University of Liverpool.

Warren was centrally involved in the Whitley Council system of wage negotiation, representing the National Association of Local Government Officers (NALGO). He was elected to NALGO's National Executive in 1936, and served until he won election as the union's General Secretary in 1946. He represented the union on various bodies, including the International Union of Local Authorities, and from 1950 served as joint secretary of the Whitley Council for Local Authorities.

In 1954, Warren was made an Officer of the Order of the British Empire. He retired from his trade union posts in 1957, and served on the London Electricity Board. In his spare time, he wrote a number of books on local government; his 1946 work, The English Local Government System, was translated into German and Hindi.

Trade union offices
Preceded by Haden Corser	General Secretary of the National Association of Local Government Officers; 1946–1957	Succeeded by Walter Anderson
