= Meg Hillier =

British politician (born 1969)

Dame Meg Hillier DBE MP
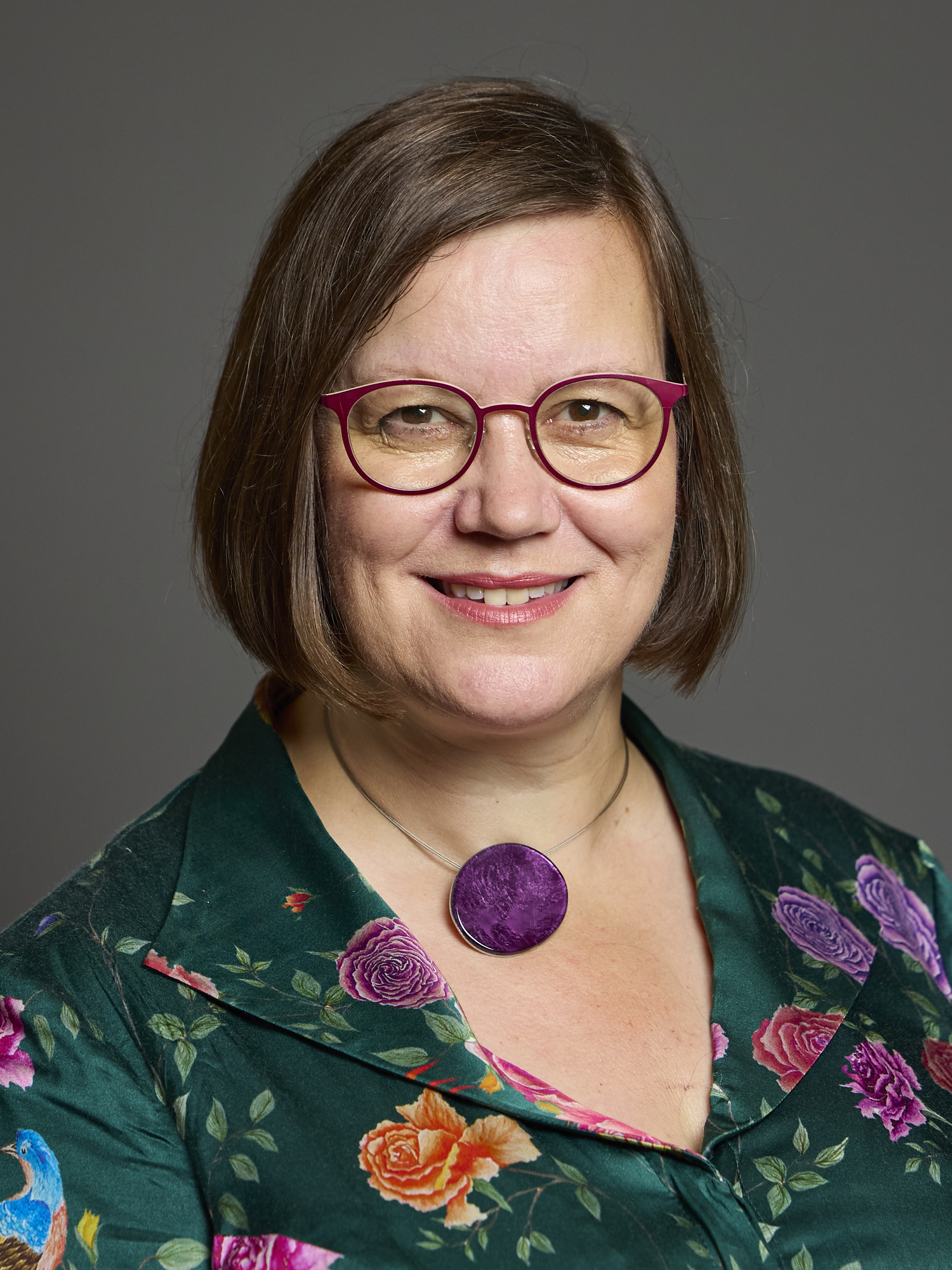
- Official portrait, 2024

Chair of the Liaison Committee
- Incumbent
- Assumed office 10 December 2024
- Preceded by: Bernard Jenkin

Chair of the Treasury Select Committee
- Incumbent
- Assumed office 9 September 2024
- Preceded by: Harriett Baldwin

Chair of the Public Accounts Committee
- In office 18 June 2015 – 30 May 2024
- Preceded by: Margaret Hodge
- Succeeded by: Geoffrey Clifton-Brown

Shadow Secretary of State for Energy and Climate Change
- In office 8 October 2010 – 7 October 2011
- Leader: Ed Miliband
- Preceded by: Ed Miliband
- Succeeded by: Caroline Flint

Parliamentary Under-Secretary of State for Identity
- In office 28 June 2007 – 12 May 2010
- Prime Minister: Gordon Brown
- Preceded by: Joan Ryan (Under-Secretary of State for Nationality, Citizenship and Immigration)
- Succeeded by: Lynne Featherstone (Under-Secretary of State for Criminal Information)

Member of Parliament for Hackney South and Shoreditch
- Incumbent
- Assumed office 5 May 2005
- Preceded by: Brian Sedgemore
- Majority: 14,737 (35.4%)

Member of the London Assembly for North East
- In office 4 May 2000 – 10 June 2004
- Preceded by: Constituency established
- Succeeded by: Jennette Arnold

Mayor of Islington
- In office May 1998 – May 1999
- Preceded by: Rupert Perry
- Succeeded by: Jenny Sands

Islington Borough Councillor for Sussex Ward
- In office 5 May 1994 – 2 May 2002
- Succeeded by: Ward abolished

Personal details
- Born: Margaret Olivia Hillier; 14 February 1969 (age 57) Hampstead, London, England
- Party: Labour and Co-operative
- Spouse: Joe Simpson (m. 1997)
- Children: 3
- Education: St Hilda's College, Oxford
- Website: www.meghillier.com

Dame Margaret Olivia Hillier (born 14 February 1969), known as Meg Hillier, is a British Labour and Co-operative politician who has been the Member of Parliament (MP) for Hackney South and Shoreditch since 2005. Hillier was a junior government minister from 2007 until 2010 and was succeeded by Caroline Flint as Shadow Secretary of State for Energy and Climate Change in the Labour Party October 2011 reshuffle. She has been the chair of the Treasury Select Committee since 2024, having previously chaired the Public Accounts Committee from 2015 to 2024.

== Early life and career ==
Margaret Hillier was born on 14 February 1969 in Hampstead, and educated at Portsmouth High School, a private school for girls in Southsea, Hampshire. She then went to St Hilda's College at the University of Oxford, where she read Philosophy, Politics and Economics. During her time there she was elected Librarian of the Oxford Union Society.

Hillier worked as a journalist in regional press and social housing media and was elected as a Councillor in the London Borough of Islington in 1994, representing the Sussex ward and serving as Mayor of Islington in 1998, before standing down from the Council in 2002. She was elected as a founding Member of the London Assembly for North East London at the first London Assembly election of 2000, serving on the Assembly until 2004, and was a board member of Transport for London until her election to Parliament.

Hillier served as Trustee of the War Memorials Trust from November 2001 until 2016.

== Parliamentary career ==
In 2004, Hillier was selected as the Labour prospective parliamentary candidate to contest Hackney South and Shoreditch through an all-women shortlist. At the 2005 general election, she was elected to the House of Commons as MP for Hackney South and Shoreditch, winning with 52.9% of the vote and a majority of 10,204. Hillier made her maiden speech on 24 May 2005, noting there were more men in the House of Commons that day than there had ever been women MPs.

Hillier served as member of the Northern Ireland Affairs Select Committee for a year until she was appointed Parliamentary Private Secretary to the Secretary of State for Communities and Local Government Ruth Kelly in 2006. In June 2007, she was appointed a Parliamentary Under-Secretary of State at the Home Office.

During maternity leave beginning in March 2009, her ministerial role was taken over by Shahid Malik. In March 2008, Hillier voted with the Government in favour of nationwide Post Office closures, including seven in Hackney, of which her constituency forms a part.

In December 2009, while promoting the National Identity Card scheme as Identity Minister in Liverpool, she admitted she had forgotten her own ID card, attributing the error to the demands of looking after her baby.

At the 2010 general election, Hillier was re-elected as MP for Hackney South and Shoreditch with an increased vote share of 55.7% and an increased majority of 14,288. She was again re-elected at the 2015 general election with an increased vote share of 64.4% and an increased majority of 24,213.

In June 2015, Hillier was elected Chairman of the Public Accounts Committee (PAC) in succession to Margaret Hodge. She was, as a result, among the 100 most influential people in the NHS according to the Health Service Journal in 2016. As chair, she has been critical of the Troubled Families programme, saying that the PAC's conclusions on the programme were "far more serious" than "a slap on the wrist" for ministers.

An ardent supporter of the Remain campaign during the 2016 EU referendum, Hillier announced that she was "devastated" that the United Kingdom voted to leave the European Union and that the decision was fuelled by "xenophobic undertones".

She supported Owen Smith in the failed attempt to replace Jeremy Corbyn in the 2016 Labour Party leadership election.

Hillier was again re-elected at the snap 2017 general election with an increased vote share of 79.4% and an increased majority of 37,931.

She stood for election as Speaker of the House of Commons during the 2019 Speaker election. However, she was unsuccessful, securing 10 votes (or 1.8%) in the first round, and coming in 7th out of seven candidates.

At the 2019 general election, Hillier was again re-elected, with a decreased vote share of 73.3% and a decreased majority of 33,985.

Hillier was appointed Dame Commander of the Order of the British Empire (DBE) in the 2021 Birthday Honours for political and parliamentary service.

At the 2024 general election, Hillier was again re-elected, again with a decreased vote share of 59.3 and a decreased majority of 14,737. She was elected unopposed as chair of the Treasury Select Committee on 9 September 2024.

== Personal life ==
Hillier married Joe Simpson in 1997; the couple have three children. She is a Roman Catholic.

Parliament of the United Kingdom
Preceded by Brian Sedgemore	Member of Parliament for Hackney South and Shoreditch; 2005–present	Incumbent
Political offices
Preceded by Ed Miliband	Shadow Secretary of State for Energy and Climate Change; 2010–2011	Succeeded by Caroline Flint
