= Kevin Hughes (politician) =

British politician (1952–2006)

- Hughes as an MP

Member of Parliament for Doncaster North
- In office 9 April 1992 – 11 April 2005
- Preceded by: Michael Welsh
- Succeeded by: Ed Miliband

Personal details
- Born: Kevin Michael Hughes; 15 December 1952 Doncaster, England
- Died: 16 July 2006 (aged 53) Doncaster, England
- Party: Labour (1978–2006)
- Other political affiliations: New Communist Party of Britain (1977–1978)
- Spouse: Lynda Saunders (m. 1972)
- Children: 2
- Education: University of Sheffield

Kevin Michael Hughes (15 December 1952 – 16 July 2006) was a British Labour politician. He was Member of Parliament (MP) for Doncaster North from 1992 to 2005. He served as a government whip and was previously a coal miner and official for the National Union of Mineworkers (NUM).

== Background ==
Hughes was born in Doncaster in 1952, the son of a coal miner. He was educated at Owston Park secondary modern and took up his father's profession in 1970. He remained a miner until 1990 and attended University of Sheffield for three years under a day-release scheme.

== Political career ==
Originally a communist, he joined the New Communist Party in 1977 but left to join the Labour Party in 1978. He served as a branch delegate and member of the Yorkshire area committee of the NUM. He was elected as a member of Doncaster Metropolitan Borough Council in 1986 and elected to Parliament in the 1992 general election for the safe Labour seat of Doncaster North. As an MP, he was sponsored by the NUM, although the number of working coal pits in his constituency had been reduced from 6 to only 1. He campaigned on pit safety issues before the privatisation of British Coal in the early 1990s.

Despite allegations being made against him by fellow councillor Ron Rose, Hughes avoided blame in the "Donnygate" scandal, which resulted in 21 former members of Doncaster council being convicted for fraud offences. He retained his seat in the House of Commons in 1997, despite being opposed by an "anti-fraud" candidate, and again in 2001. He became a whip for the opposition in 1996 and was a junior whip in the Labour government from 1997 to 2001. He was viewed as a Blairite and vigorously supported the invasion of Iraq in 2003.

During a November 2001 debate in Parliament, Hughes expressed support for anti-terrorism legislation following the September 11 attacks, with a comment which became famous for disparaging left-liberal readers of The Guardian who opposed such measures:

Does my right hon. Friend find it bizarre—as I do—that the yoghurt and muesli-eating, Guardian-reading fraternity are only too happy to protect the human rights of people engaged in terrorist acts, but never once do they talk about the human rights of those who are affected by them?

== Personal life ==
Hughes married Lynda Saunders in 1972, and they had a son and a daughter together. His son joined the Army and served in the 2003 Gulf War.

Hughes stood down early from Parliament in 2005 after being diagnosed with motor neurone disease. He died in Doncaster on 16 July 2006, at the age of 53.

Parliament of the United Kingdom
Preceded by Michael Welsh	Member of Parliament for Doncaster North; 1992–2005	Succeeded by Ed Miliband
