= Martin Redmond =

British politician

Member of Parliament for Don Valley
- In office 9 June 1983 – 20 January 1997
- Preceded by: Michael Welsh
- Succeeded by: Caroline Flint

Personal details
- Born: 15 August 1937 Scawsby, Doncaster
- Died: 20 January 1997 (aged 59)
- Party: Labour

Martin Redmond (15 August 1937 – 20 January 1997) was a British Labour Party politician from Doncaster in South Yorkshire.

Martin Redmond was of Irish descent and was born in Scawsby, near Doncaster. He was educated at Woodlands Roman Catholic School and then by day release at the University of Sheffield. He worked as a driver of heavy goods vehicles, and was elected to Doncaster Borough Council in 1975. He became leader of the council in 1982, and was elected at the 1983 general election as the Member of Parliament (MP) for Don Valley, sponsored by the National Union of Mineworkers. He made his maiden speech in the House of Commons in a debate on housing on 5 July 1983, and spoke frequently in the Commons on the miners strike.

He was a leading member of the All-Party Parliamentary Groups for interest in Thailand, Bahrain, Malta and ASEAN.

He was re-elected in 1987 and 1992, but died in office in January 1997 from cancer. No by-election was held, and his seat remained vacant when Parliament was dissolved in April for the general election in May 1997. The seat was won by Caroline Flint of the Labour Party.

Parliament of the United Kingdom
Preceded by Michael Welsh	Member of Parliament for Don Valley; 1983–1997	Succeeded by Caroline Flint
Trade union offices
Preceded by Walter Anderson and Ronald Rigby	Trades Union Congress representative to the AFL-CIO; 1975; With: Danny McGarvey	Succeeded by Len Edmondson and Cyril Plant
