= Lee Pitcher =

British politician (born 1977)

Lee Pitcher MP
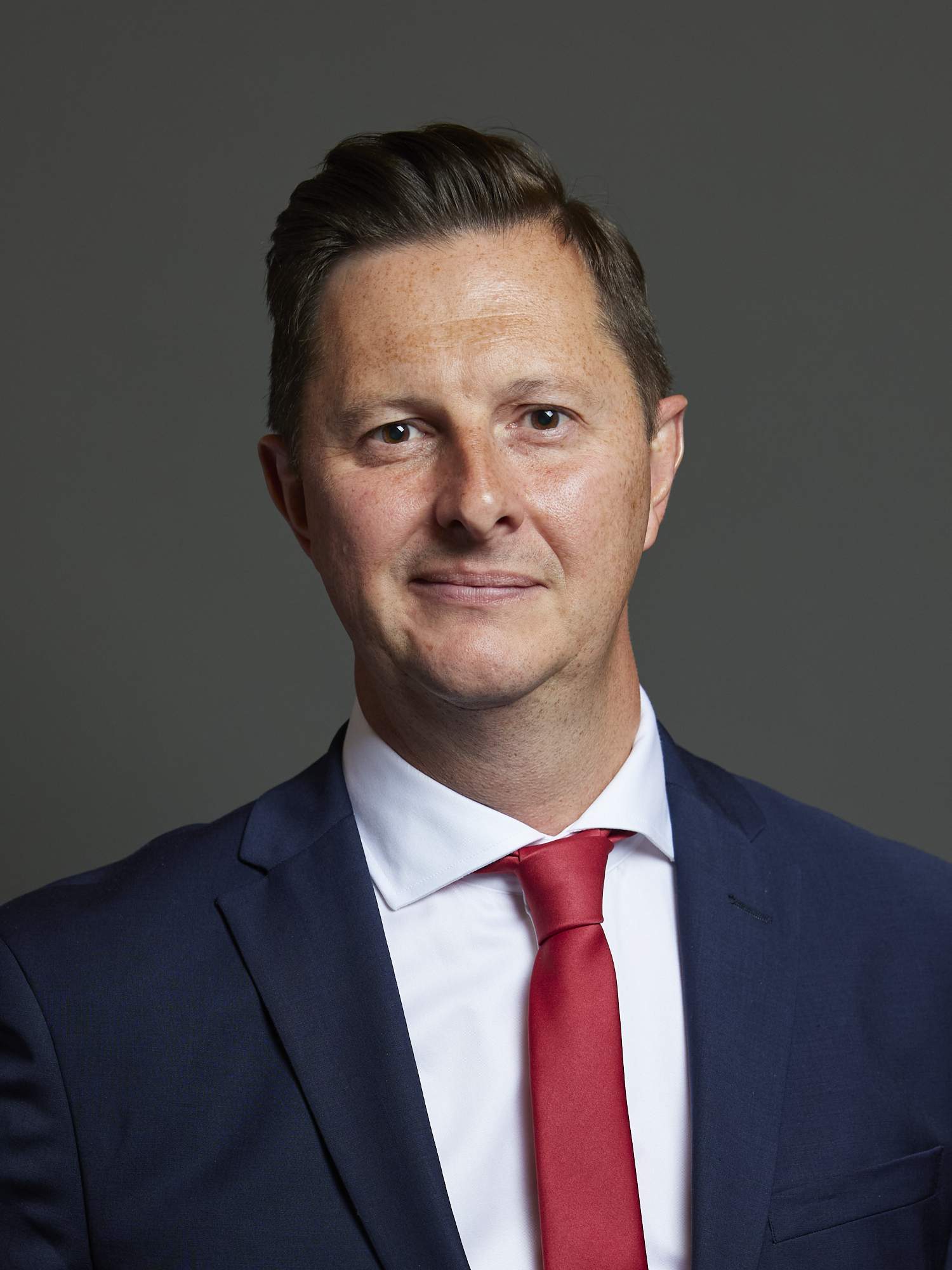
- Official portrait, 2024

Parliamentary Private Secretary for Department of Environment, Food and Rural Affairs
- Incumbent
- Assumed office 27 July 2026 Serving with Jayne Kirkham
- Prime Minister: Andy Burnham

Member of Parliament for Doncaster East and the Isle of Axholme
- Incumbent
- Assumed office 4 July 2024
- Preceded by: Constituency Established
- Majority: 2,311 (5.9%)

Personal details
- Born: Lee Michael Pitcher; 18 July 1977 (age 49)
- Party: Labour
- Occupation: Politician

Lee Michael Pitcher (born 18 July 1977) is a British Labour Party politician who has served as Member of Parliament (MP) for Doncaster East and the Isle of Axholme since 2024.

== Early life and education ==
Lee Michael Pitcher was born on 18 July 1977.

Pitcher was homeless for a period as a child, and was also a victim of bullying at school which he has said was due to the length of his trousers. He later earned a Master's degree.

== Career ==
Pitcher previously worked three jobs simultaneously. He is also the chair of governors for Travis St Lawrence Church of England School in Hatfield, and was also a voluntary chairman of an Arts and Culture school.

Pitcher worked for Jacobs Solutions, a technical services company, in water management. A post on the company website says that "Lee has spent 22 years with water utilities, starting on the front line in public health as a sewer baiter to control the rodent population."

=== Political ===
Pitcher was the chair and mayor of Hatfield Town Council from 2023 to 2024.

On 6 August 2023, Pitcher was selected as the Labour Party candidate for Doncaster East and the Isle of Axholme. Prior to being selected as prospective parliamentary candidate, Pitcher worked as head of partnerships for Yorkshire Water.

In the 2024 general election, Pitcher was elected MP for the seat of Doncaster East and the Isle of Axholme; winning 15,122 votes, with a majority of 2,311 votes. He made his maiden speech on 18 July 2024.

== Personal life ==
Pitcher is a member of the Doncaster Lions. He is a supporter of West Ham United.

Pitcher is married with children, and his family lives in the Doncaster East and the Isle of Axholme constituency.

In 2022, he was selected to carry the Queen's Platinum Jubilee Baton at the Commonwealth Games.

Parliament of the United Kingdom
New constituency	Member of Parliament for Doncaster East and the Isle of Axholme; 2024–present	Incumbent
