= Michael Welsh (Labour politician) =

British coal miner and Labour Party politician

Member of Parliament for Don Valley
- In office 3 May 1979 – 13 May 1983
- Preceded by: Richard Kelley
- Succeeded by: Martin Redmond

Member of Parliament for Doncaster North
- In office 9 June 1983 – 16 March 1992
- Preceded by: Constituency Created
- Succeeded by: Kevin Hughes

Personal details
- Born: 23 November 1926 Doncaster
- Died: 20 January 2012 (aged 85) Carcroft, Doncaster
- Party: Labour

Michael Collins Welsh (23 November 1926 – 20 January 2012) was a coal miner and Labour Party politician from South Yorkshire in England. He sat in the House of Commons from 1979 to 1992.

Welsh was educated at elementary schools, at the University of Sheffield and at Ruskin College in Oxford. He was a local councillor from 1962, and was elected at the 1979 general election as the Member of Parliament (MP) for the Labour safe seat of Don Valley, sponsored by National Union of Mineworkers (NUM). In 1981, when the NUM in Yorkshire began to demand that its five sponsored MPs should support the unions' policies, Welsh was reported by The Times as the only one who was sufficiently left-wing to retain the union's support. In the 1981 Labour Party deputy leadership election in 1981, Welsh voted for the left-wing candidate Tony Benn in both ballots.

During the Falklands War in May 1982, Welsh was one of 69 MPs who signed an early day motion calling for an immediate halt to hostilities.

After boundary changes he was returned at the 1983 general election as MP for the new Doncaster North constituency. He was nominated in November that year to the Foreign Affairs Select Committee, and in July 1985 he was one of four Labour MPs on the committee who rejected the committee's finding that there were military grounds for the sinking during the Falklands War of the Argentinian warship General Belgrano. The four MPs (Welsh, Dennis Canavan, Ian Mikardo and Nigel Spearing) published a minority report which accused the government of obstructing the committee by "suppression of evidence and giving of false evidence" and called for a further enquiry.

He was re-elected in 1987, and retired from Parliament at the 1992 general election.

Welsh died at his home in Carcroft, Doncaster in January 2012 aged 85.

Parliament of the United Kingdom
Preceded by Richard Kelley	Member of Parliament for Don Valley; 1979–1983	Succeeded by Martin Redmond
New constituency	Member of Parliament for Doncaster North; 1983–1992	Succeeded by Kevin Hughes
