= The Cotswolds (UK Parliament constituency) =

Parliamentary constituency in the United Kingdom, 1997-2024

- Former county constituency for the House of Commons
- Boundary of The Cotswolds in Gloucestershire for the 2010 general election

- Location of Gloucestershire within England
- County: Gloucestershire
- Electorate: 78,439 (December 2010)

1997–2024
- Seats: One
- Created from: Cirencester and Tewkesbury
- Replaced by: North Cotswolds, South Cotswolds

The Cotswolds was a constituency in Gloucestershire in the House of Commons of the UK Parliament. It was represented by Geoffrey Clifton-Brown, a Conservative, since its 1997 creation.

The seat was abolished in the 2023 review of Westminster constituencies. It was split into two smaller constituencies: North Cotswolds and South Cotswolds, to even up voter numbers relative to other constituencies.

== Members of Parliament ==
Election	Member	Party	
1997	Sir Geoffrey Clifton-Brown	Conservative	1992–1997: represented Cirencester and Tewkesbury.

== Constituency profile ==
The Cotswolds was a safe Conservative seat.

The largest town in the constituency was Cirencester, a compact traditional town. Other settlements included Andoversford, Bourton-on-the-Water, Chipping Campden, Fairford, Lechlade, Moreton-in-Marsh, Northleach, Stow-on-the-Wold, Tetbury (and the neighbouring village of Doughton, location of Highgrove, the Prince of Wales's estate), and Wotton-under-Edge.

The seat had the highest number of listed buildings of any constituency in Britain. It also contained eight of the 20 most popular attractions in Gloucestershire, including Westonbirt Arboretum, Hidcote Manor, and Chedworth Roman Villa.

Workless claimants, registered jobseekers, were in November 2012 significantly lower than the national average of 3.8%, at 1.6% of the population based on a statistical compilation by The Guardian.

This was also the constituency that, when declared during the 2015 general election, saw the Conservatives win a surprise majority, in which David Cameron was re-elected as prime minister; a hung parliament had been widely expected.

== Boundaries ==
Map of boundaries 2010–2024

The constituency was created in 1997 as Cotswold, mostly from the former seat of Cirencester and Tewkesbury. In 2010 the name was changed to The Cotswolds to reflect the commonly used name of the area.

1997–2010: The District of Cotswold, and the District of Stroud ward of Wotton and Kingswood.

2010–2024: The District of Cotswold, and the District of Stroud wards of Kingswood, Minchinhampton, and Wotton-under-Edge.

== Abolition ==
Following the 2023 review of Westminster constituencies, the seat was abolished prior to the 2024 general election, with its contents distributed to two new constituencies:

- The towns of Chipping Campden, Moreton-in-Marsh, Stow-on-the-Wold, Bourton-on-the-Water and Minchinhampton to North Cotswolds
- The towns of Cirencester and Tetbury to South Cotswolds

Wotton-under-Edge will be transferred to Stroud.

== Elections ==
=== Elections in the 2010s ===
2019 general election: The Cotswolds
Party	Candidate	Votes	%	±%
Conservative	Geoffrey Clifton-Brown	35,484	58.0	−2.1
Liberal Democrats	Liz Webster	15,270	25.0	+8.7
Labour	Alan MacKenzie	7,110	11.6	−6.3
Green	Sabrina Poole	3,312	5.4	+2.5
Majority		20,214	33.0	−9.3
Turnout		61,176	74.7	+0.4
Registered electors		81,939		
Conservative hold		Swing	−5.4	

2017 general election: The Cotswolds
Party	Candidate	Votes	%	±%
Conservative	Geoffrey Clifton-Brown	36,201	60.1	+4.1
Labour	Mark Huband	10,702	17.9	+8.7
Liberal Democrats	Andrew Gant	9,748	16.3	−2.3
Green	Sabrina Poole	1,747	2.9	−1.7
UKIP	Chris Harlow	1,197	2.0	−8.9
Independent	Sandy Steel	107	0.2	N/A
Majority		25,499	42.3	+4.8
Turnout		59,702	74.2	+1.8
Registered electors		80,449		
Conservative hold		Swing	−2.3	

2015 general election: The Cotswolds
Party	Candidate	Votes	%	±%
Conservative	Geoffrey Clifton-Brown	32,045	56.5	+3.5
Liberal Democrats	Paul Hodgkinson	10,568	18.6	−10.9
UKIP	Chris Harlow	6,188	10.9	+6.7
Labour	Manjinder Kang	5,240	9.2	−1.5
Green	Penny Burgess	2,626	4.6	+2.9
Majority		21,477	37.9	+14.4
Turnout		56,667	72.4	+0.9
Registered electors		78,292		+2.0
Conservative hold		Swing	+7.2	

2010 general election: The Cotswolds
Party	Candidate	Votes	%	±%
Conservative	Geoffrey Clifton-Brown	29,075	53.0	+3.7
Liberal Democrats	Mike Collins	16,211	29.6	+1.5
Labour	Mark Dempsey	5,886	10.7	−7.9
UKIP	Adrian Blake	2,292	4.2	+1.0
Green	Kevin Lister	940	1.7	N/A
Independent	Alex Steel	428	0.8	N/A
Majority		12,864	23.5	+2.2
Turnout		54,832	71.5	+4.2
Registered electors		76,728		+2.3
Conservative hold		Swing	+1.1	

=== Elections in the 2000s ===
2005 general election: Cotswold
Party	Candidate	Votes	%	±%
Conservative	Geoffrey Clifton-Brown	23,326	49.3	−1.0
Liberal Democrats	Philip Beckerlegge	13,638	28.8	+4.6
Labour	Mark Dempsey	8,457	17.9	−4.7
UKIP	Richard Buckley	1,538	3.2	+0.3
Independent	James Derieg	392	0.8	N/A
Majority		9,688	20.5	−5.6
Turnout		47,351	66.7	−0.8
Registered electors		71,039		+4.2
Conservative hold		Swing	−2.8	

2001 general election: Cotswold
Party	Candidate	Votes	%	±%
Conservative	Geoffrey Clifton-Brown	23,133	50.3	+4.0
Liberal Democrats	Angela Lawrence	11,150	24.2	+1.3
Labour	Richard Wilkins	10,383	22.6	−0.1
UKIP	Jill Stopps	1,315	2.9	N/A
Majority		11,983	26.1	+2.7
Turnout		45,981	67.5	−8.5
Registered electors		68,157		+1.2
Conservative hold		Swing	+1.3	

=== Elections in the 1990s ===
1997 general election: Cotswold
Party	Candidate	Votes	%	±%
Conservative	Geoffrey Clifton-Brown	23,698	46.4	−8.0
Liberal Democrats	David Gayler	11,733	22.9	−10.4
Labour	David Elwell	11,608	22.7	+11.8
Referendum	Rupert Lowe	3,393	6.6	−
Green	Valerie Michael	560	1.1	−
Natural Law	Henry Brighouse	129	0.3	−
Majority		11,965	23.4	+2.4
Turnout		51,121	75.9	−6.5
Registered electors		67,333		+5.9
Conservative win (new seat)				

== See also ==
- Parliamentary constituencies in Gloucestershire
