= Caroline Flint =

British Labour politician (born 1961)

The Right Honourable Caroline Flint
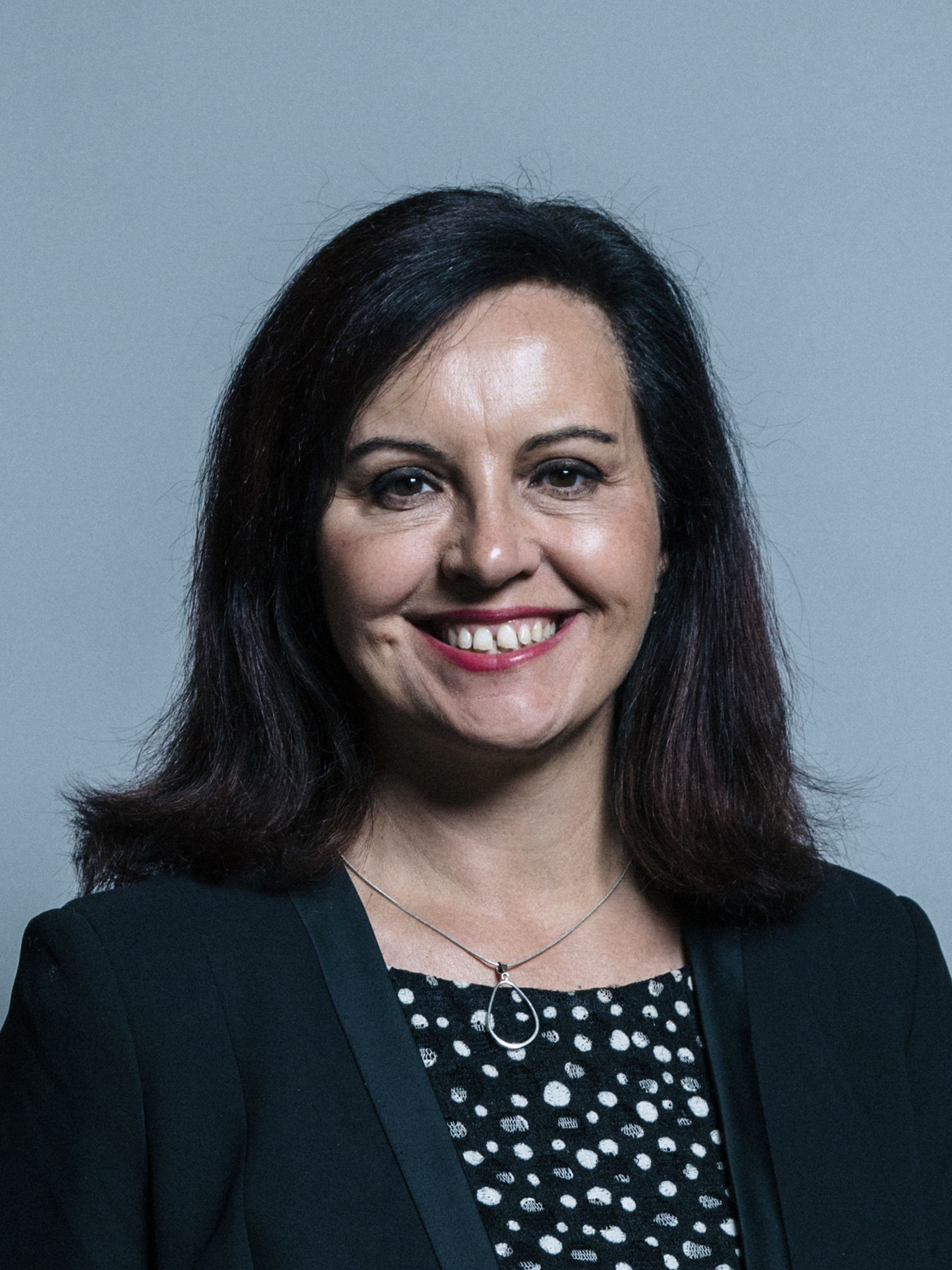
- Official portrait, 2017

Minister of State for Europe
- In office 3 October 2008 – 5 June 2009
- Prime Minister: Gordon Brown
- Preceded by: Jim Murphy
- Succeeded by: The Baroness Kinnock of Holyhead

Minister of State for Housing and Planning
- In office 24 January 2008 – 3 October 2008
- Prime Minister: Gordon Brown
- Preceded by: Yvette Cooper
- Succeeded by: Margaret Beckett

Minister of State for Employment
- In office 28 June 2007 – 24 January 2008
- Prime Minister: Gordon Brown
- Preceded by: Jim Murphy
- Succeeded by: Stephen Timms

Minister for Yorkshire and the Humber
- In office 28 June 2007 – 24 January 2008
- Prime Minister: Gordon Brown
- Preceded by: Office established
- Succeeded by: Rosie Winterton

Minister of State for Public Health
- In office 10 May 2005 – 28 June 2007
- Prime Minister: Tony Blair
- Preceded by: Melanie Johnson
- Succeeded by: Dawn Primarolo

Parliamentary Under-Secretary of State for Home Affairs
- In office 13 June 2003 – 10 May 2005
- Prime Minister: Tony Blair
- Preceded by: The Lord Filkin
- Succeeded by: Andy Burnham
Shadow portfolios
Shadow Secretary of State for Communities and Local Government
In office 8 October 2010 – 7 October 2011
Leader	Ed Miliband
Preceded by	John Denham
Succeeded by	Hilary Benn
Shadow Secretary of State for Energy and Climate Change
In office 7 October 2011 – 14 September 2015
Leader	Ed Miliband
Preceded by	Meg Hillier
Succeeded by	Lisa Nandy

Member of Parliament for Don Valley
- In office 1 May 1997 – 6 November 2019
- Preceded by: Martin Redmond
- Succeeded by: Nick Fletcher

Personal details
- Born: 20 September 1961 (age 64) Twickenham, Middlesex, England
- Party: Labour
- Spouse: Phil Cole (m. 2001)
- Education: University of East Anglia (BA)
- Caroline Flint's voice Flint on the government's offender learning prospectus Recorded 12 March 2008

Caroline Louise Flint (born 20 September 1961) is a British politician who served as Member of Parliament (MP) for Don Valley from 1997 to 2019. A member of the Labour Party, she attended the Cabinet as Minister for Housing and Planning in 2008 and Minister for Europe from 2008 to 2009.

One of 101 female Labour MPs elected at the 1997 general election, Flint served in the government of Tony Blair as a junior Home Office Minister from 2003 to 2005 and Public Health Minister from 2005 to 2007. She remained in government under Gordon Brown as both Employment Minister and a Regional Minister from 2007 until 2008, when she was promoted to the Cabinet. She resigned in 2009, citing disagreement with the leadership of the Prime Minister.

Flint was elected to the shadow cabinet following Labour's 2010 election defeat, and appointed Shadow Communities and Local Government Secretary by opposition leader Ed Miliband. She was Shadow Energy and Climate Change Secretary from 2011 to 2015, and finished third-place in the 2015 deputy Labour leadership contest. Flint returned to the backbenches in 2015 and was defeated in her seat at the 2019 general election.

== Early life and career ==
Caroline was born on 20 September 1961 at a home for unmarried mothers in Twickenham, Middlesex. Her mother, Wendy Beasley, was a typist who gave birth to her at 17-years old. Caroline never knew her father's identity, but she was adopted at 2 year-old by TV technician Peter Flint after he married her mother. She grew-up in a one-bedroom flat with her parents and half-brother and sister, but lost contact with Peter after he divorced her mother during her early teens. After becoming a heavy drinker, Wendy died from liver failure at the age of 45.

She was educated at Twickenham Girls' School and Richmond Tertiary College. Flint earned a Bachelor of Arts from the University of East Anglia in American Literature/History with Film Studies. She joined the Labour Party in 1979 and served as women's officer for the National Organisation of Labour Students from 1982 to 1984.

Flint began her career at the Inner London Education Authority, where she was management trainee from 1984 to 1985 and policy officer from 1985 to 1987. She was head of the women's unit at the National Union of Students from 1988 to 1989. Flint worked at Lambeth Council as an equal opportunities Officer from 1989 to 1991, and a welfare and staff development officer from 1991 to 1993. She was a senior researcher and political officer for the trade union GMB from 1994 to 1997.

== Parliamentary career ==
Flint was elected as Member of Parliament (MP) for Don Valley at the 1997 general election. She was re-elected at the 2001, 2005, 2010, 2015 and 2017 general elections. She is a member of the Fabian Society and of Labour Friends of Israel.

=== Parliamentary Private Secretary (1999–2003) ===
Flint became parliamentary private secretary (PPS) to Peter Hain in 1999, while he was a Minister of State at the Department of Trade and Industry and Foreign Office. She changes roles to become PPS to John Reid in 2002, while he served as Leader of the House of Commons and Minister without portfolio.

=== Junior Minister and Minister (2003–2008) ===
She entered government as a junior minister in June 2003, as a Parliamentary Under-Secretary of State for Home Affairs. During her tenure at the Home Office, Flint reclassified magic mushrooms as a Class A drug. She pushed through the bill despite some concerns from Parliamentary colleagues.

Flint was moved to the Public health portfolio at the Department of Health in May 2005, initially as a Parliamentary Under-Secretary of State and as a Minister of State from May 2006. As a health minister, she was responsible for government programmes such as the prevention of communicable diseases and sex education. She oversaw campaigns to tackle issues such as obesity, diabetes, heart disease and cancer.

In the 2007 deputy Labour leadership election, Flint was the campaign manager for cabinet minister Hazel Blears. Her bid was unsuccessful, and she finished sixth-place in the election.

After Gordon Brown became Prime Minister, Flint moved to the Department for Work and Pensions as Minister for Employment and Welfare Reform. She was also appointed to one of the new regional ministerial roles, as Minister for Yorkshire and the Humber.

=== Cabinet Minister (2008–2009) ===
In January 2008, Flint was promoted to attend the Cabinet of the United Kingdom as Minister of State for Housing and Planning. She was also appointed to the Privy Council. During her tenure in the role, Flint suggested unemployed council tenants should "actively seek work" as a condition of their occupancy. She once inadvertently revealed house price forecasts when her briefing papers were visible to the press.

Flint moved roles to become Minister of State for Europe in the October 2008 government reshuffle. Although remaining a Cabinet attendee, she was now only entitled to attend when her brief was on the agenda. Flint notably oversaw the implementation of the Lisbon Treaty into UK law in her role, and was criticised for admitting to not fully reading the document.

She resigned from government after the June 2009 reshuffle, asserting that Brown ran a "two-tier government" and treated her as "female window dressing". Flint renewed her attack on Brown in a subsequent Observer article, complaining of "constant pressure" and "negative bullying".

In an investigation following the 2009 expenses scandal, she was required to repay £572 in over-claimed expenses. Flint voted in-favour of legislation which would have kept MPs' expense details secret.

=== Shadow Cabinet Minister and Deputy Leadership (2010–2015) ===
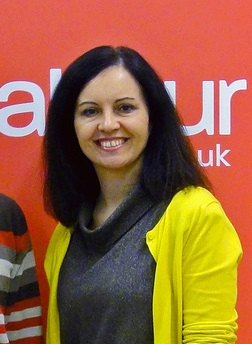
Flint in 2012

Following Labour's defeat at the 2010 general election, Flint was elected to the shadow cabinet in October 2010. She was appointed Shadow Secretary of State for Communities and Local Government by party leader Ed Miliband, and reshuffled to Shadow Secretary of State for Energy and Climate Change in October 2011. Flint abstained on the 2011 Commons vote on military intervention in Libya.

Following the 2015 general election, she stood as a candidate in the deputy Labour leadership election. Seen as an early front-runner, she gained 43 MP nominations but finished third-place.

=== Return to Backbenches (2015–2019) ===
In the 2015 Parliament, Flint was a member of the Public Accounts Committee, Intelligence and Security Committee, Administration Committee, Education Sub-Committee, Education and Employment Committee, and Modernisation of the Commons Committee.

She campaigned for Remain during the 2016 EU referendum, in opposition to her leave-voting constituency. Following the vote, Flint called for acceptance of the result to "allow the voices of her constituents to be heard". She supported Owen Smith in the failed attempt to replace Jeremy Corbyn in the subsequent Labour leadership election.

Flint was a frequent rebel against the Labour leadership's Brexit position, defying the party whip on several votes to support the government and oppose pro-EU bills and amendments. She was one of six Labour MPs to vote in favour of Prime Minister Boris Johnson's Brexit withdrawal agreement.

Following flooding in her constituency in November 2019, she called on the Prime Minister to declare a national emergency to provide financial help to affected families.

Flint lost her seat at the 2019 general election to Conservative candidate Nick Fletcher. She attributed the defeat to Corbyn's leadership, criticising the party for losing public trust and being too city-centric and anti-Brexit. In a later interview, she claimed that shadow cabinet minister Emily Thornberry had called northern Brexit voters "stupid". Thornberry denied the allegation and threatened legal action against Flint. Following her election defeat, she was described by Prime Minister Boris Johnson as "first-rate" and mentioned by Cabinet Minister Michael Gove as the Labour Leader he would have feared most.

== Post-parliamentary career ==
Flint was appointed to chair the Humber Teaching NHS Foundation Trust in May 2021 and Committee on Fuel Poverty in January 2022.

She made several appearances on GB News from August 2021, but ceased to appear several months later.

== Personal life ==
Flint's first marriage was to Saief Zammel, a Tunisian stockbroker, with whom she had a son, Karim, and daughter, Hanna. In 1990, she divorced Zammel, who was charged with violent disorder and later deported from England after an incident involving her.

She remarried to Phil Cole, a PR professional and former Labour Party officer, in July 2001. Flint later employed him as her constituency office manager, and he has been a Member of Doncaster Council since 2012. They reside in Sprotbrough, South Yorkshire.

Along with several other Labour women MPs, she was a member of a tap dancing troupe known as the Division Belles.

Parliament of the United Kingdom
Preceded by Martin Redmond	Member of Parliament for Don Valley; 1997–2019	Succeeded by Nick Fletcher
Political offices
Preceded by Melanie Johnson	Minister of State for Public Health; 2005–2007	Succeeded by Dawn Primarolo
Preceded by Jim Murphy	Minister of State for Employment; 2007–2008	Succeeded by Stephen Timms
New office	Minister for Yorkshire and the Humber; 2007–2008	Succeeded by Rosie Winterton
Preceded by Yvette Cooper	Minister of State for Housing and Planning; 2008	Succeeded by Margaret Beckett
Preceded by Jim Murphy	Minister of State for Europe; 2008–2009	Succeeded by The Baroness Kinnock of Holyhead
Preceded by John Denham	Shadow Secretary of State for Communities and Local Government; 2010–2011	Succeeded by Hilary Benn
Preceded by Meg Hillier	Shadow Secretary of State for Energy and Climate Change; 2011–2015	Succeeded by Lisa Nandy
