= Don Valley (constituency) =

Parliamentary constituency in the United Kingdom, 1918–2024

- Former county constituency for the House of Commons
- 2010–2024 boundary of Don Valley in South Yorkshire

- Location of South Yorkshire within England
- County: South Yorkshire
- Electorate: 74,456 (December 2019)

1918–2024
- Seats: One
- Created from: Doncaster
- Replaced by: Doncaster East and the Isle of Axholme; Rawmarsh and Conisbrough (part); Doncaster Central (minor part)

Don Valley is a former constituency (Note: A county constituency (for the purposes of election expenses and type of returning officer)) in South Yorkshire, represented in the House of Commons of the UK Parliament. It elected one Member of Parliament at least once every five years using the first-past-the-post system of voting.

Further to the completion of the 2023 periodic review of Westminster constituencies, the seat was subject to boundary changes which included gain of the Isle of Axholme in the Borough of North Lincolnshire and the loss of Conisbrough to the new constituency of Rawmarsh and Conisbrough. As a consequence, it was renamed Doncaster East and the Isle of Axholme, and was first contested at the 2024 general election.

== Constituency profile ==
Created in 1918, Don Valley was a former coal mining area which elected only Labour MPs from 1922 to 2019. The seat recorded a strong Brexit vote (69%) in the 2016 referendum.

== Boundaries ==
Map of boundaries 2010–2024

1918—1950: The Urban Districts of Mexborough and Tickhill, and the Rural Districts of Doncaster and Thorne.

1950—1983: The Urban Districts of Adwick-le-Street, Bentley with Arksey, and Tickhill, and the Rural District of Doncaster.

1983—1997: The Metropolitan Borough of Doncaster wards of Conisbrough, Edlington and Warmsworth, Mexborough, Richmond, Rossington, South East, and Southern Parks.

1997—2010: The Metropolitan Borough of Doncaster wards of Conisbrough, Edlington and Warmsworth, Hatfield, Rossington, South East, and Southern Parks.

2010—2024: The Metropolitan Borough of Doncaster wards of Conisbrough and Denaby, Edlington and Warmsworth, Finningley, Hatfield, Rossington, Thorne, and Torne Valley.

The constituency consisted of the southern Borough of Doncaster, from Hatfield and the Humberhead Peatlands Nature Reserve in the north and northeast, through Branton, Auckley, and Rossington, to the Torne Valley electoral ward which consists of Wadworth, Tickhill, Braithwell, and in the west Conisbrough.

In boundary changes which took effect at the 2010 election, Sprotbrough was moved to Doncaster North, while in the east the town of Thorne was moved from Doncaster North into Don Valley.

== Members of Parliament ==
Doncaster prior to 1918

Election	Member	Party
1918	James Walton	Coalition National Democratic
1922	Thomas Williams	Labour
1959	Richard Kelley	Labour
1979	Michael Welsh	Labour
1983	Martin Redmond	Labour
1997	Caroline Flint	Labour
2019	Nick Fletcher	Conservative
2024	Constituency abolished	

== Election results 1918–2024 ==
Don Valley general election results

=== Elections in the 1910s ===
General election 1918: Don Valley
Party		Candidate	Votes	%	±%
C	National Democratic	James Walton	6,095	46.2	
	Liberal	Hastings Lees-Smith	3,868	29.3	
	Labour	Edward Hough	3,226	24.5	
Majority			2,227	16.9	
Turnout			13,189	45.9	
Registered electors			28,724		
	National Democratic win (new seat)				
C indicates candidate endorsed by the coalition government.

=== Elections in the 1920s ===
General election 1922: Don Valley
Party	Candidate	Votes	%	±%
Labour	Thomas Williams	9,903	47.0	▲22.5
National Liberal	James Walton	5,797	27.6	▼18.6
Liberal	John Henry Freeborough	5,332	25.4	▼3.9
Majority		4,106	19.4	N/A
Turnout		21,032	65.4	▲19.5
Registered electors		32,175		
Labour gain from National Democratic		Swing	▲20.6	

General election 1923: Don Valley
Party	Candidate	Votes	%	±%
Labour	Thomas Williams	12,898	60.4	▲13.4
Unionist	John Wells Reynolds	8,451	39.6	New
Majority		4,447	20.8	▲1.4
Turnout		21,349	62.2	▼3.2
Registered electors		34,339		
Labour hold		Swing	N/A	

General election 1924: Don Valley
Party	Candidate	Votes	%	±%
Labour	Thomas Williams	14,598	53.9	▼6.5
Unionist	John Wells Reynolds	12,463	46.1	▲6.5
Majority		2,135	7.8	▼13.0
Turnout		27,421	72.8	▲10.6
Registered electors		37,184		
Labour hold		Swing	▼6.5	

General election 1929: Don Valley
Party	Candidate	Votes	%	±%
Labour	Thomas Williams	31,466	73.3	▲19.4
Unionist	Walter Liddall	11,467	26.7	▼19.4
Majority		19,999	46.6	▲38.8
Turnout		42,933	69.7	▼3.1
Registered electors		61,604		
Labour hold		Swing	▲19.4	

=== Elections in the 1930s ===
General election 1931: Don Valley
Party	Candidate	Votes	%	±%
Labour	Thomas Williams	27,599	58.6	▼14.7
Conservative	Samuel Hardwick	19,506	41.4	▲14.7
Majority		8,093	17.2	▼29.4
Turnout		47,105	71.2	▲1.5
Labour hold		Swing		

General election 1935: Don Valley
Party	Candidate	Votes	%	±%
Labour	Thomas Williams	33,220	68.9	▲10.3
Conservative	John Arbuthnot	14,961	31.1	▼10.3
Majority		18,259	37.8	▲20.6
Turnout		48,181	70.0	▼1.2
Labour hold		Swing		

=== Elections in the 1940s ===
General election 1945: Don Valley
Party	Candidate	Votes	%	±%
Labour	Thomas Williams	40,153	71.7	▲2.8
Conservative	J. J. A. N. Ross	15,832	28.3	▼2.8
Majority		24,321	43.4	▲5.6
Turnout		55,985	73.2	▲3.2
Labour hold		Swing		

=== Elections in the 1950s ===
General election 1950: Don Valley
Party	Candidate	Votes	%	±%
Labour	Thomas Williams	39,789	74.0	▲2.3
Conservative	Douglas Graham	12,982	24.1	▼4.2
Communist	Samuel Taylor	1,007	1.9	New
Majority		26,807	49.9	▲6.5
Turnout		53,778	87.7	▲14.5
Labour hold		Swing		

General election 1951: Don Valley
Party	Candidate	Votes	%	±%
Labour	Thomas Williams	39,687	74.1	▲0.1
Conservative	David S B Hopkins	13,862	25.9	▲1.8
Majority		25,825	48.2	▼1.7
Turnout		53,549	85.9	▼1.8
Labour hold		Swing		

General election 1955: Don Valley
Party	Candidate	Votes	%	±%
Labour	Thomas Williams	38,433	73.7	▼0.4
Conservative	Jack Victor Thornton	13,701	26.3	▲0.4
Majority		24,732	47.4	▼0.8
Turnout		52,134	81.2	▼4.7
Labour hold		Swing		

General election 1959: Don Valley
Party	Candidate	Votes	%	±%
Labour	Richard Kelley	40,935	70.9	▼2.8
Conservative	Geoffrey Dodsworth	16,787	29.1	▲2.8
Majority		24,148	41.8	▼5.6
Turnout		57,722	83.8	▲2.6
Labour hold		Swing		

=== Elections in the 1960s ===
General election 1964: Don Valley
Party	Candidate	Votes	%	±%
Labour	Richard Kelley	42,452	71.9	▲1.0
Conservative	David Philip Jeffcock	16,593	28.1	▼1.0
Majority		25,859	43.8	▲2.0
Turnout		59,045	80.8	▼3.0
Labour hold		Swing		

General election 1966: Don Valley
Party	Candidate	Votes	%	±%
Labour	Richard Kelley	43,973	74.9	▲3.0
Conservative	Richard Storey	14,738	25.1	▼3.0
Majority		29,235	49.8	▲6.0
Turnout		58,711	78.3	▼2.5
Labour hold		Swing		

=== Elections in the 1970s ===
General election 1970: Don Valley
Party	Candidate	Votes	%	±%
Labour	Richard Kelley	42,496	69.5	▼5.4
Conservative	Timothy Walter G Jackson	18,673	30.5	▲5.4
Majority		23,823	39.0	▼10.8
Turnout		61,169	73.1	▼5.2
Labour hold		Swing		

General election February 1974: Don Valley
Party	Candidate	Votes	%	±%
Labour	Richard Kelley	48,737	70.1	▲0.6
Conservative	P. J. Le Bosquet	20,792	29.9	▼0.6
Majority		27,945	40.2	▲1.2
Turnout		69,529	79.1	▲6.0
Labour hold		Swing		

General election October 1974: Don Valley
Party	Candidate	Votes	%	±%
Labour	Richard Kelley	41,187	63.3	▼6.8
Conservative	Peter J. Le Bosquet	13,767	21.1	▼8.8
Liberal	E. Simpson	10,161	15.6	New
Majority		27,420	42.2	▲2.0
Turnout		65,115	73.6	▼5.5
Labour hold		Swing		

General election 1979: Don Valley
Party	Candidate	Votes	%	±%
Labour	Michael Welsh	39,603	55.6	▼7.7
Conservative	Roger Freeman	22,243	31.2	▲10.1
Liberal	E. Simpson	8,238	11.6	▼4.0
Workers Party	I. Connelly	720	1.0	New
Workers Revolutionary	T. McCabe	398	0.6	New
Majority		17,360	24.4	▼17.8
Turnout		71,202	74.7	▲1.1
Labour hold		Swing		

=== Elections in the 1980s ===
General election 1983: Don Valley
Party	Candidate	Votes	%	±%
Labour	Martin Redmond	23,036	45.1	▼10.5
Conservative	Brenda Utting	16,570	32.4	▲1.2
Liberal	Donald Lange	11,482	22.5	▲10.9
Majority		6,466	12.7	▼11.7
Turnout		51,088	69.9	▼4.8
Labour hold		Swing		

General election 1987: Don Valley
Party	Candidate	Votes	%	±%
Labour	Martin Redmond	29,200	53.1	▲8.0
Conservative	Charles Gallagher	17,733	32.3	▼0.1
Liberal	Wilfrid Whitaker	8,027	11.9	▼10.6
Majority		11,467	20.8	▲8.1
Turnout		54,960	73.8	▲3.9
Labour hold		Swing		

=== Elections in the 1990s ===
General election 1992: Don Valley
Party	Candidate	Votes	%	±%
Labour	Martin Redmond	32,008	55.0	▲1.9
Conservative	Nicholas Paget-Brown	18,474	31.7	▼0.6
Liberal Democrats	M Jevons	6,920	11.9	0.0
Green	TS Platt	803	1.4	New
Majority		13,534	23.3	▲2.5
Turnout		58,205	76.3	▲2.5
Labour hold		Swing	▲1.2	

General election 1997: Don Valley
Party	Candidate	Votes	%	±%
Labour	Caroline Flint	25,376	58.3	▲3.3
Conservative	Clare H. Gledhill	10,717	24.6	▼7.1
Liberal Democrats	Paul Johnston	4,238	9.7	▼2.2
Referendum	Paul R. Davis	1,379	3.2	New
Socialist Labour	Nigel Ball	1,024	2.4	New
Green	Stephen Platt	493	1.1	▼0.3
ProLife Alliance	Claire D. Johnson	330	0.8	New
Majority		14,659	33.7	▲10.4
Turnout		43,557	66.4	▼9.9
Labour hold		Swing		

=== Elections in the 2000s ===
General election 2001: Don Valley
Party	Candidate	Votes	%	±%
Labour	Caroline Flint	20,009	54.6	▼3.7
Conservative	James Browne	10,489	28.6	▲4.0
Liberal Democrats	Philip Smith	4,089	11.2	▲1.5
Independent	Terry Wilde	800	2.2	New
UKIP	David Cooper	777	2.1	New
Socialist Labour	Nigel Ball	466	1.3	▼1.1
Majority		9,520	26.0	▼7.7
Turnout		36,630	54.8	▼11.6
Labour hold		Swing		

General election 2005: Don Valley
Party	Candidate	Votes	%	±%
Labour	Caroline Flint	19,418	52.7	▼1.9
Conservative	Adam Duguid	10,820	29.4	▲0.8
Liberal Democrats	Stewart Arnold	6,626	18.0	▲6.8
Majority		8,598	23.3	▼2.7
Turnout		36,864	55.1	▼0.7
Labour hold		Swing	▼1.3	

=== Elections in the 2010s ===
General election 2010: Don Valley
Party	Candidate	Votes	%	±%
Labour	Caroline Flint	16,472	37.9	▼18.6
Conservative	Matt Stephens	12,877	29.7	▲2.7
Liberal Democrats	Edwin Simpson	7,422	17.1	▲0.6
BNP	Erwin Toseland	2,112	4.9	New
UKIP	William Shaw	1,904	4.4	New
English Democrat	Bernie Aston	1,756	4.0	New
Independent	Martin Williams	887	2.0	New
Majority		3,595	8.2	▼15.1
Turnout		43,430	59.3	▲4.2
Labour hold		Swing		

General election 2015: Don Valley
Party	Candidate	Votes	%	±%
Labour	Caroline Flint	19,621	46.2	▲8.3
Conservative	Carl Jackson	10,736	25.3	▼4.4
UKIP	Guy Aston	9,963	23.5	▲19.1
Liberal Democrats	Rene Paterson	1,487	3.5	▼13.6
TUSC	Steve Williams	437	1.0	New
English Democrat	Louise Dutton	242	0.6	▼3.4
Majority		8,885	20.9	▲12.7
Turnout		42,486	59.6	▲0.3
Labour hold		Swing		

General election 2017: Don Valley
Party	Candidate	Votes	%	±%
Labour	Caroline Flint	24,351	53.0	▲6.8
Conservative	Aaron Bell	19,182	41.7	▲16.4
Yorkshire	Stevie Manion	1,599	3.5	New
Liberal Democrats	Anthony Smith	856	1.9	▼1.6
Majority		5,169	11.3	▼9.6
Turnout		45,988	62.2	▲2.6
Labour hold		Swing	▼4.8	

General election 2019: Don Valley
Party	Candidate	Votes	%	±%
Conservative	Nick Fletcher	19,609	43.2	▲1.5
Labour	Caroline Flint	15,979	35.2	▼17.8
Brexit Party	Paul Whitehurst	6,247	13.7	New
Liberal Democrats	Mark Alcock	1,907	4.2	▲2.3
Green	Kate Needham	872	1.9	New
Yorkshire	Chris Holmes	823	1.8	▼1.7
Majority		3,630	8.0	N/A
Turnout		45,437	60.3	▼1.9
Conservative gain from Labour		Swing	▲8.1	

== See also ==
- List of parliamentary constituencies in South Yorkshire

== Sources ==
- Guardian Unlimited Politics (Election results from 1992 to the present)
- Politicsresources.net – Official Web Site ✔ (Election results from 1951 to the present)
- F. W. S. Craig, British Parliamentary Election Results 1918 – 1949
- F. W. S. Craig, British Parliamentary Election Results 1950 – 1970
