= Doncaster North =

UK Parliament constituency (since 1983)

Coordinates: 53.577°N 1.055°W

- County constituency for the House of Commons
- Interactive map of boundaries from 2024
- Boundary of Doncaster North in Yorkshire and the Humber
- County: South Yorkshire
- Electorate: 71,348 (December 2019)
- Major settlements: Mexborough, Stainforth

Current constituency
- Created: 1983
- Member of Parliament: Ed Miliband (Labour)
- Seats: One
- Created from: Don Valley; Goole

Doncaster North is a constituency (Note: A county constituency (for the purposes of election expenses and type of returning officer)) in South Yorkshire that was created in 1983. The seat has been represented in the House of Commons of the Parliament of the United Kingdom since 2005 by Ed Miliband of the Labour Party. Miliband currently serves as Foreign Secretary under the government of Andy Burnham, having previously served as the Energy Secretary under the governments of Gordon Brown (when the office was known as the Department of Energy and Climate Change) and Keir Starmer (when the office was known as the Department for Energy Security and Net Zero). From 2010 until 2015, he was Leader of the Opposition. (Note: As with all constituencies, the constituency elects one Member of Parliament (MP) by the first-past-the-post system of election at least every five years.)

== Constituency profile ==
The Doncaster North constituency is located in South Yorkshire within the City of Doncaster borough. It contains the suburbs of the city of Doncaster which lie north of the River Don (Cusworth and Bentley) and the rural areas to their north and west, including the towns of Mexborough, Askern and Stainforth, the village of Sprotbrough and the connected villages of Woodlands, Adwick le Street and Carcroft. The towns and villages in the area were traditionally reliant on coal mining. High levels of deprivation are present in the constituency, particularly in Stainforth, Bentley and Mexborough which fall within the 10% most-deprived areas in England, although Cusworth and Sprotbrough are generally affluent. The average house price in the constituency is less than half the national average.

Compared to the rest of the country, residents of Doncaster North have low incomes, are less likely to work in professional occupations and have very low levels of education. At the 2021 census, 97% of the population were White. At the city council, almost all councillors elected from wards in this constituency are from Reform UK. Voters in Doncaster North overwhelmingly supported leaving the European Union in the 2016 referendum; an estimated 70% voted in favour of Brexit, one of the top 25 highest rates out of 650 constituencies nationwide.

== History ==
Doncaster North has returned Labour MPs since 1983, when the constituency was created from parts of the former constituencies of Don Valley, Doncaster, Goole.

Part of the red wall, it was formerly a Labour stronghold until the 2019 general election, when Labour held the seat with a significantly reduced majority. At the following election in 2024, it once again became a fairly safe Labour seat.

Ed Miliband has served as the MP for the constituency since 2005, and he also served as Leader of the Labour Party and Leader of the Opposition from 2010 until stepping down after the 2015 general election.

At the EU referendum held on 23 June 2016, Doncaster voted to leave the European Union. This was a contrast to the views of Miliband, who advocated a "Remain" vote. Miliband was re-elected at the 2019 general election with a significantly reduced majority of 2,370 votes (5.8%), which is attributed to Brexit Party candidate Andy Stewart picking up 8,294 votes and finishing in third place with 20.4% of the vote. At the 2024 election, Reform UK (the successor to the Brexit Party) did not stand, which helped Labour increase its majority back up to 29.5%.

== Boundaries ==
Map of boundaries 2010–2024

1983–1997: The Metropolitan Borough of Doncaster wards of Adwick, Askern, Bentley Central, Bentley North Road, Hatfield, Stainforth, and Thorne.

1997–2010: The Metropolitan Borough of Doncaster wards of Adwick, Askern, Bentley Central, Bentley North Road, Stainforth, and Thorne.

2010–2024: The Metropolitan Borough of Doncaster wards of Adwick, Askern Spa, Bentley, Great North Road, Mexborough, Sprotbrough, Stainforth and Moorends.

2024–present: The City of Doncaster wards of Adwick le Street & Carcroft, Bentley, Mexborough, Norton & Askern, Roman Ridge, Sprotbrough, and Stainforth & Barnby Dun.

Minor changes to reflect modifications to ward boundaries and names.

== Members of Parliament ==
Don Valley and Goole prior to 1983

Election	Member	Party
1983	Michael Welsh	Labour
1992	Kevin Hughes	Labour
2005	Ed Miliband	Labour

== Elections ==
General election results 1983–2017

=== Elections in the 2020s ===
General election 2024: Doncaster North
Party	Candidate	Votes	%	±%
Labour	Ed Miliband	16,231	52.4	+14.1
Conservative	Glenn Bluff	7,105	22.9	−10.3
SDP	Dave Bettney	1,960	6.3	N/A
Green	Tony Nicholson	1,778	5.7	N/A
British Democratic	Frank Calladine	1,160	3.7	N/A
Yorkshire	Christopher Dawson	1,059	3.4	+1.0
Liberal Democrats	Jonathan Harston	1,045	3.4	−0.2
Party of Women	Catherine Briggs	452	1.5	N/A
TUSC	Andy Hiles	212	0.7	N/A
Majority		9,126	29.5	+24.3
Turnout		31,002	44.4	−11.5
Registered electors		69,759		
Labour hold		Swing	+12.2	

=== Elections in the 2010s ===
2019 notional result
Party	Vote	%
Labour	15,356	38.3
Conservative	13,286	33.2
Brexit Party	8,151	20.3
Liberal Democrats	1,446	3.6
Others	859	2.2
Green	18	<0.0
Turnout	40,070	55.9
Electorate	71,739	

General election 2019: Doncaster North
Party	Candidate	Votes	%	±%
Labour	Ed Miliband	15,740	38.7	−22.1
Conservative	Katrina Sale	13,370	32.9	+5.3
Brexit Party	Andy Stewart	8,294	20.4	N/A
Liberal Democrats	Joe Otten	1,476	3.6	+1.9
Yorkshire	Stevie Manion	959	2.4	+0.6
English Democrat	Frank Calladine	309	0.8	−0.1
Independent	Eddie Todd	220	0.5	N/A
Independent	Wendy Bailey	188	0.4	N/A
Independent	Neil Wood	142	0.3	N/A
Majority		2,370	5.8	−27.4
Turnout		40,698	56.4	−2.1
Labour hold		Swing	−13.6	

General election 2017: Doncaster North
Party	Candidate	Votes	%	±%
Labour	Ed Miliband	25,711	60.8	+8.4
Conservative	Shade Adoh	11,687	27.6	+9.3
UKIP	Kim Parkinson	2,738	6.5	−16.1
Yorkshire	Charlie Bridges	741	1.8	N/A
Liberal Democrats	Robert Adamson	706	1.7	−0.8
Independent	Frank Calladine	366	0.9	N/A
English Democrat	David Allen	363	0.9	−0.2
Majority		14,024	33.2	+3.4
Turnout		42,312	58.5	+2.8
Labour hold		Swing	−0.5	

General election 2015: Doncaster North
Party	Candidate	Votes	%	±%
Labour	Ed Miliband	20,708	52.4	+5.1
UKIP	Kim Parkinson	8,928	22.6	+18.3
Conservative	Mark Fletcher	7,235	18.3	−2.7
Liberal Democrats	Penny Baker	1,005	2.5	−12.4
Green	Pete Kennedy	757	1.9	N/A
English Democrat	David Allen	448	1.1	−4.1
TUSC	Mary Jackson	258	0.7	+0.3
Monster Raving Loony	Nick the Flying Brick	162	0.4	N/A
Majority		11,780	29.8	+3.5
Turnout		39,501	55.7	−1.6
Labour hold		Swing	−6.1	

General election 2010: Doncaster North
Party	Candidate	Votes	%	±%
Labour	Ed Miliband	19,637	47.3	−8.8
Conservative	Sophie Brodie	8,728	21.0	+6.8
Liberal Democrats	Ed Sanderson	6,174	14.9	−0.8
BNP	Pamela Chambers	2,818	6.8	+2.8
English Democrat	Wayne Crawshaw	2,148	5.2	+3.7
UKIP	Liz Andrews	1,797	4.3	+2.1
TUSC	Bill Rawcliffe	181	0.4	N/A
Majority		10,909	26.3	−12.7
Turnout		41,483	57.3	+4.7
Labour hold		Swing	−2.8	

=== Elections in the 2000s ===
General election 2005: Doncaster North
Party	Candidate	Votes	%	±%
Labour	Ed Miliband	17,531	55.5	−7.6
Conservative	Martin Drake	4,875	15.4	+0.7
Liberal Democrats	Doug Pickett	3,800	12.0	+1.4
Community Group	Martin Williams	2,365	7.5	N/A
BNP	Lee Hagan	1,506	4.8	N/A
UKIP	Robert Nixon	940	3.0	+0.7
English Democrat	Michael Cassidy	561	1.8	N/A
Majority		12,656	40.1	−8.3
Turnout		31,578	51.1	+0.6
Labour hold		Swing	−4.2	

General election 2001: Doncaster North
Party	Candidate	Votes	%	±%
Labour	Kevin Hughes	19,788	63.1	−6.7
Conservative	Anita Kapoor	4,601	14.7	−0.1
Liberal Democrats	Colin Ross	3,323	10.6	+2.2
Independent	Martin Williams	2,926	9.3	N/A
UKIP	John Wallis	725	2.3	N/A
Majority		15,187	48.4	−6.6
Turnout		31,363	50.5	−12.8
Labour hold		Swing	−3.3	

=== Elections in the 1990s ===
General election 1997: Doncaster North (Note: The 1997 election result is calculated relative to the notional, not the actual, 1992 result.)
Party	Candidate	Votes	%	±%
Labour	Kevin Hughes	27,843	69.8	+8.0
Conservative	Peter Kennerley	5,906	14.8	−7.5
Liberal Democrats	Michael Cook	3,369	8.4	−4.5
Referendum	Ron Thornton	1,589	4.0	N/A
Anti Sleaze Labour	Neil Swan	1,181	3.0	N/A
Majority		21,937	55.0	+12.9
Turnout		39,888	63.3	−10.6
Labour hold		Swing	+6.6	

General election 1992: Doncaster North
Party	Candidate	Votes	%	±%
Labour	Kevin Hughes	34,135	61.8	±0.0
Conservative	Robert C Light	14,322	25.9	+1.5
Liberal Democrats	Steve Whiting	6,787	12.3	−1.6
Majority		19,813	35.9	−1.5
Turnout		55,244	73.9	+0.8
Labour hold		Swing	−0.7	

=== Elections in the 1980s ===
General election 1987: Doncaster North
Party	Candidate	Votes	%	±%
Labour	Michael Welsh	32,950	61.8	+9.0
Conservative	Richard Shepherd	13,015	24.4	−3.2
SDP	Peter Norwood	7,394	13.9	−5.8
Majority		19,935	37.4	+12.2
Turnout		53,359	73.1	+3.2
Labour hold		Swing	+6.1	

General election 1983: Doncaster North
Party	Candidate	Votes	%	±%
Labour	Michael Welsh	26,626	52.8	
Conservative	Michael Stephen	13,915	27.6	
SDP	Dennis Orford	9,916	19.7	
Majority		12,711	25.2	
Turnout		50,457	69.9	
Labour win (new seat)				

== See also ==
- Parliamentary constituencies in South Yorkshire
- Parliamentary constituencies in Yorkshire and the Humber

== Sources ==
- Ed Miliband, MP for Doncaster North The website of Ed Miliband

Parliament of the United Kingdom
Preceded by Camberwell and Peckham	Constituency represented by the leader of the opposition 2010–2015	Succeeded by Camberwell and Peckham
Preceded by Pontefract, Castleford and Knottingley	Constituency represented by the foreign secretary 2026–present	Incumbent
