= Nick Fletcher (politician) =

British Conservative politician

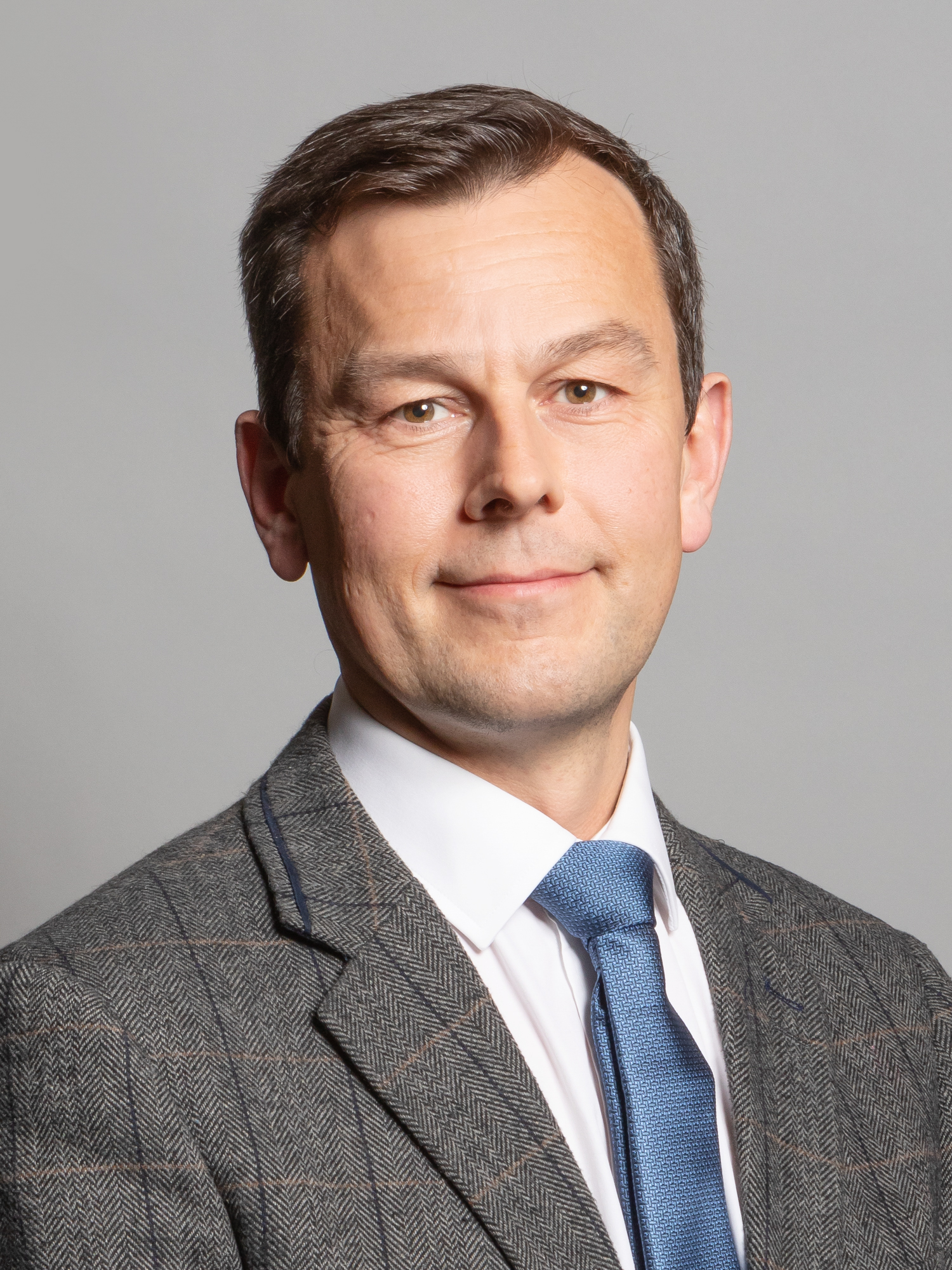
- Official portrait, 2020

Member of Parliament for Don Valley
- In office 12 December 2019 – 30 May 2024
- Preceded by: Caroline Flint
- Succeeded by: Constituency abolished

Personal details
- Born: 15 July 1972 (age 54) Armthorpe, West Riding of Yorkshire, England
- Party: Conservative
- Spouse: Gail Fletcher
- Children: 2
- Website: www.nickfletcher.org.uk

Nicholas Anthony Fletcher (born 15 July 1972) is a British Conservative Party politician who was the Member of Parliament (MP) for Don Valley from the 2019 general election until 2024. He was the only Conservative ever to be elected for the seat.

== Early life and career ==
Fletcher grew up in Armthorpe, Doncaster, and attended Armthorpe Comprehensive before gaining a HNC in electronic engineering in 1992. In 1994, after being made redundant, he took a business course and established Analogue Electrics in Doncaster.

Before being elected to Parliament, Fletcher served as the director of Doncaster Chamber of Commerce (Doncaster Chamber) from 19 December 2018 to 13 December 2019. He also served as the chairman of the Doncaster Conservative Federation.

Fletcher is a landlord. As of 2023, he owned six houses and four flats in South Yorkshire. At the time he was an MP, The Guardian reported this was the highest number of residential, letting properties held by any MP.

== Political positions ==
=== Gender equality ===
In his first notable media presence, as part of a debate in the UK Parliament's Westminster Hall, for International Men's Day 2021, Fletcher claimed that male role models in film and television were being replaced by women (namely Luke Skywalker, The Equalizer, Doctor Who, and The Ghostbusters), linking that to the number of young men turning to crime. His apparent opposition to women playing these roles was criticised by fellow MPs (including Luke Pollard), and also condemned by some social media users as sexist and misogynistic.

In his defence, Fletcher states this part of his speech was dealing with the wider issue of positive role-models for young men and that the controversy results from looking only at a short section.

=== Transgender issues ===
In June 2022, Fletcher sent letters to all schools in his constituency urging head teachers to "push back" against the "transgender lifestyle", arguing that allowing children to take hormone blockers is "affirming something that is nothing more than a phase". The letters were not well received by Doncaster Schools, with one school reporting that the letters were "neither helpful nor positively received".

=== Immigration ===
In December 2023 Nick Fletcher was criticised for stating that A&E waiting lists in his constituency of Don Valley were excessively long due to high levels of immigration. He said of his constituency "We are turning parts of our community into a ghetto... you have a 12 hour waiting list at A&E, & the reason why the waiting list is so long, is because people don't speak English in these places anymore”. He was said by opposition members to have been echoing Enoch Powell's “Rivers of Blood Speech”.

== Parliamentary career ==
Fletcher won the seat of Don Valley from Labour incumbent Caroline Flint in 2019, with a majority of 8%, representing a swing of 8.1%. In doing so, he was the first Conservative to be elected for the seat, with the constituency having been held by Labour since 1922.

Fletcher delivered his maiden speech on 16 March 2020, where he spoke about the importance of role models for young people.

Between 2 March 2020 and 2024, Fletcher was a member of the Petitions Committee.

Following an interim report on the connections between colonialism and properties now in the care of the National Trust, including links with historic slavery, Fletcher was among the signatories of a letter to the Telegraph in November 2020 from the "Common Sense Group" of Conservative Parliamentarians. The letter accused the National Trust of being "coloured by cultural Marxist dogma, colloquially known as the 'woke agenda'".

Fletcher endorsed Kemi Badenoch during the July 2022 Conservative Party leadership election. After Badenoch was eliminated, Fletcher supported Liz Truss.

In February 2023 Fletcher raised conspiracy theories around the urban design concept of the "15-minute city" in the House of Commons, requesting time to discuss the matter he referred to as an "international socialist concept".

In June 2023, he was one of six Conservative MPs to vote against censuring Boris Johnson following the Commons Privileges Committee investigation.

== Affiliations ==
During his time as a member of parliament, Fletcher sat as a Vice Chair or Officer for several All-Party Parliamentary Groups, including:

- APPG on Electric Vehicles
- APPG on Transport Across the North
- APPG on Shared Ownership Housing
- APPG on Skills, Careers and Employment
- APPG on Small and Micro Business

He also chaired APPG on Issues Affecting Men and Boys

Fletcher is a member of the Northern Research Group, a group founded by Conservative MPs who represented constituencies in northern England, Wales and the Scottish Borders. He was also a member of the Common Sense Group, a Parliamentary organisation which represents the socially conservative wing of the Conservative Party.

== Personal life ==
Fletcher resides in Bawtry and is married to Gail. They have two children, James and Lucy. He says he is a practising Christian. He described his election win as miracle performed by God, and has said publicly that "Christ is the greatest role model anyone can have."

He has been a long-time runner. He ran the London Marathon in October 2021, raising over £2,000 by eliciting donations to his chosen charity, the Children's Cancer and Leukaemia Group.

Parliament of the United Kingdom
Preceded by Caroline Flint	Member of Parliament for Don Valley; 2019–2024	Succeeded by Constituency abolished
