= Yorkshire Party election results =

This page includes the election results of the Yorkshire Party, a regional political party based in Yorkshire.

== General election results ==
=== Summary ===
Constituency	2015		2017		2019		2024	
Constituency	Votes	%	Votes	%	Votes	%	Votes	%
East Riding of Yorkshire
Beverley and Holderness	658	1.2%	1,158	2.1%	1,441	2.7%	625	1.4%
Brigg and Goole (2010–24)	Did not stand						–	
East Yorkshire (2010–24); Bridlington and The Wolds (2024–present)	720	1.4%	1,015	1.9%	1,686	3.2%	915	2.1%
Haltemprice and Howden (2010–24); Goole and Pocklington (2024–present)	479	1.0%	942	1.8%	1,039	2.1%	Did not stand	
Kingston upon Hull East	270	0.8%	Did not stand					
Kingston upon Hull North (2010–24); Kingston upon Hull North and Cottingham (2024–present)	366	1.0%	Did not stand					
Kingston upon Hull West and Hessle (2010–24); Kingston upon Hull West and Haltemprice (2024–present)	Did not stand							
North Yorkshire
Harrogate and Knaresborough	Did not stand				1,208	2.1%	Did not stand	
Richmond (Yorks) (2010–24); Richmond and Northallerton (2024–present)	Did not stand		2,106	3.7%	1,077	1.9%	132	0.3%
Scarborough and Whitby	Did not stand		369	0.7%	1,770	3.6%	477	1.1%
Selby and Ainsty	Did not stand				1,900	3.4%	Did not stand	
Skipton and Ripon	Did not stand		1,539	2.6%	1,131	1.9%	627	1.2%
Thirsk and Malton	Did not stand				881	1.6%	931	1.9%
South Yorkshire
Barnsley Central (2010–24); Barnsley North (2024–present)	Did not stand				710	1.9%	603	1.6%
Barnsley East (2010–24); Barnsley South (2024–present)	647	1.7%	1,215	3.0%	Did not stand		1,441	2.7%
Don Valley (2010–24); Doncaster East and the Isle of Axholme (2024–present)	Did not stand		1,599	3.5%	823	1.8%	Did not stand	
Doncaster Central	Did not stand		1,346	3.1%	1,012	2.4%	742	2.0%
Doncaster North	Did not stand		741	1.8%	959	2.4%	1,059	3.4%
Penistone and Stocksbridge	Did not stand							
Rother Valley	Did not stand							
Rotherham	Did not stand		1,432	3.8%	1,085	3.0%	1,363	3.7%
Sheffield Brightside and Hillsborough	Did not stand							
Sheffield Central	Did not stand		197	0.4%	416	0.8%	Did not stand	
Sheffield Hallam	Did not stand							
Sheffield Heeley	Did not stand							
Sheffield South East	Did not stand				966	2.3%	Did not stand	
Wentworth and Dearne (2010–24); Rawmarsh and Conisbrough (2024–present)	Did not stand				1,201	2.9%	Did not stand	
West Yorkshire
Batley and Spen (2010–24); Spen Valley (2024–present)	Did not stand							
Bradford East	Did not stand						761	2.0%
Bradford South	Did not stand						489	1.5%
Bradford West	Did not stand							
Calder Valley	389	0.7%	Did not stand				404	0.8%
Colne Valley	572	1.0%	Did not stand		548	0.9%	459	1.0%
Dewsbury (2010–24); Dewsbury and Batley (2024–present)	236	0.4%	Did not stand					
Elmet and Rothwell (2010–24); Wetherby and Easingwold (2024–present)	Did not stand		1,042	1.8%	1,196	2.1%	743	1.4%
Halifax	Did not stand							
Hemsworth (2010–24); Normanton and Hemsworth (2024–present)	1,018	2.4%	1,135	2.5%	964	2.2%	Did not stand	
Huddersfield	Did not stand		274	0.6%	Did not stand			
Keighley (2010–24); Keighley and Ilkley (2024–present)	Did not stand				667	1.3%	389	0.8%
Leeds Central (2010–24); Leeds South (2024–present)	Did not stand							
Leeds Central and Headingley (2024–present)	–						Did not stand	
Leeds East	Did not stand		422	1.0%	Did not stand		664	1.7%
Leeds North East	Did not stand		303	0.6%	Did not stand		574	1.3%
Leeds North West	143	0.3%	Did not stand				1024	2.0%
Leeds West (2010–24); Leeds West and Pudsey (2024–present)	Did not stand		378	0.9%	650	1.6%	404	1.0%
Morley and Outwood (2010–24); Leeds South West and Morley (2024–present)	479	1.0%	Did not stand		957	1.8%	664	1.7%
Normanton, Pontefract and Castleford (2010–24); Pontefract, Castleford and Knottingley (2024–present)	Did not stand		1,431	2.9%	1,762	3.7%	Did not stand	
Pudsey (2010–24)	Did not stand		1,138	2.1%	844	1.6%	–	
Shipley	543	1.1%	Did not stand		883	1.6%	447	0.9%
Wakefield (2010–24); Ossett and Denby Dale (2024–present)	Did not stand		1176	2.5%	868	1.9%	Did not stand	
Wakefield and Rothwell (2024–present)	–						606	1.5%
York
York Central	291	0.6%	Did not stand		557	1.1%	Did not stand	
York Outer	Did not stand						260	0.5%

=== 2015 United Kingdom general election ===
Yorkshire First had candidates standing in 14 parliamentary seats. None were elected.

Constituency	Candidate	Votes	%
Barnsley East	Tony Devoy	647	1.7
Beverley and Holderness	Lee Walton	658	1.2
Calder Valley	Rod Sutcliffe	389	0.7
Colne Valley	Paul Salveson	572	1.0
Dewsbury	Richard Carter	236	0.4
East Yorkshire	Stewart Arnold	720	1.4
Haltemprice & Howden	Diana Wallis	479	1.0
Hemsworth	Martin Roberts	1,018	2.4
Kingston upon Hull East	Martin Clayton	270	0.8
Kingston upon Hull North	Vicky Butler	366	1.0
Leeds North West	Bob Buxton	143	0.3
Morley & Outwood	Arnie Craven	479	1.0
Shipley	Darren Hill	543	1.1
York Central	Chris Whitwood	291	0.6

=== By-elections, 2015–2017 ===
Date of election	Constituency	Candidate	Votes	%
5 May 2016	Sheffield, Brightside & Hillsborough	Stevie Manion	349	1.5

=== 2017 United Kingdom general election ===
The Yorkshire Party nominated 21 candidates for the 2017 general election. The average age of candidates was 35 with the youngest, Jack Render, 19. 20% were LGBT. The party received 20,958 votes making it the 6th most voted-for party in England, ahead of National Health Action and other nationwide parties. None were elected and all lost their deposits, however notable individual results included gaining 3rd place in Don Valley, Doncaster Central, and Wakefield.

Constituency	Name	Votes	%
Barnsley East	Tony Devoy	1,215	3.0
Beverley and Holderness	Lee Walton	1,158	2.1
Doncaster Central	Chris Whitwood	1,346	3.1
Doncaster North	Charlie Bridges	741	1.8
Don Valley	Stevie Manion	1,599	3.5
East Yorkshire	Timothy Norman	1,015	1.9
Elmet & Rothwell	Matthew Clover	1,042	1.8
Haltemprice & Howden	Diana Wallis	942	1.8
Hemsworth	Martin Roberts	1,135	2.5
Huddersfield	Bikatshi Katenga	274	0.6
Leeds East	John Otley	422	1.0
Leeds North East	Tess Seddon	303	0.6
Leeds West	Ed Jones	378	0.9
Normanton, Pontefract and Castleford	Daniel Gascoigne	1,431	2.9
Pudsey	Bob Buxton	1,138	2.1
Richmond (Yorks)	Chris Pearson	2,106	3.7
Rotherham	Mick Bower	1,432	3.8
Scarborough and Whitby	Bill Black	369	0.7
Sheffield Central	Jack Carrington	197	0.4
Skipton and Ripon	Jack Render	1,539	2.6
Wakefield	Lucy Brown	1,176	2.5

=== 2019 United Kingdom general election ===
The Yorkshire Party nominated 28 candidates for the 2019 general election and received 29,201 votes, an average of 1,043 per seat. While none were elected and all lost their deposits, the party's vote represented an increase on the previous 2017 general election, when the average vote per candidate was 998.

Constituency	Name	Votes	%
Barnsley Central	Ryan Thomas Williams	710	1.9
Beverley and Holderness	Andy Shead	1,441	2.7
Colne Valley	Owen Aspinall	548	0.9
Don Valley	Chris Holmes	823	1.8
Doncaster Central	Leon Sean French	1,012	2.4
Doncaster North	Stevie Shaun Manion	959	2.4
East Yorkshire	Timothy Norman	1,686	3.2
Elmet and Rothwell	Matthew Clover	1,196	2.1
Haltemprice and Howden	Richard Honnoraty	1,039	2.1
Harrogate and Knaresborough	Kieron George	1,208	2.1
Hemsworth	Martin Roberts	964	2.2
Keighley	Mark Barton	667	1.3
Leeds West	Ian Cowling	650	1.6
Morley and Outwood	Dan Woodlock	957	1.8
Normanton, Pontefract and Castleford	Laura Marie Walker	1,762	3.7
Pudsey	Bob Buxton	844	1.6
Rotherham	Dennis Bannan	1,085	3.0
Scarborough and Whitby	Lee Derrick	1,770	3.6
Selby and Ainsty	Mike Jordan	1,900	3.4
Sheffield Central	Jack Carrington	416	0.8
Sheffield South East	Alex Martin	966	2.3
Shipley	Darren Longhorn	883	1.6
Skipton and Ripon	Jack Render	1,131	1.9
Thirsk and Malton	John Hall	881	1.6
Wakefield	Ryan Kett	868	1.9
Wentworth and Dearne	Lucy Brown	1,201	2.9
York Central	Andrew John Snedden	557	1.1

=== By-elections, 2019–2024 ===
Date of election	Constituency	Name	Votes	%
1 July 2021	Batley and Spen	Corey Robinson	816	2.2
23 June 2022	Wakefield	David Herdson	1,182	4.2

=== 2024 United Kingdom general election ===
The Yorkshire Party nominated 27 candidates for the 2024 general election and received 17,227 votes, an average of 638 per seat. The party's vote represented a decrease on the previous 2019 general election, when the average vote per candidate was 1,043.

Constituency	Name	Votes	%
Barnsley North	Tony Devoy	603	1.6
Barnsley South	Simon Biltcliffe	1,441	2.7
Beverley and Holderness	George McManus	625	1.4
Bradford East	Lara Barras	761	2.0
Bradford South	Jonathan Barras	489	1.5
Bridlington and The Wolds	Tim Norman	915	2.1
Calder Valley	James Vasey	404	0.8
Colne Valley	Tim Millea	459	1.0
Doncaster Central	Andrew Walmsley	742	2.0
Doncaster North	Christopher Dawson	1,059	3.4
Keighley and Ilkley	Dominic Atlas	389	0.8
Kingston upon Hull North and Cottingham	Rowan Halstead	338	0.9
Leeds East	David Hough	664	1.7
Leeds North East	Ian Cowling	574	1.3
Leeds North West	Bob Buxton	1,024	2.0
Leeds South West and Morley	Howard Dews	664	1.7
Leeds West and Pudsey	Darren Longhorn	404	1.0
Ossett and Denby Dale	David Herdson	810	1.8
Richmond and Northallerton	Rio Goldhammer	132	0.3
Rotherham	David Atkinson	1,363	3.7
Scarborough and Whitby	Lee Derrick	477	1.1
Shipley	Will Grant	447	0.9
Skipton and Ripon	Ryan Kett	627	1.2
Thirsk and Malton	Luke Brownlee	931	1.9
Wakefield and Rothwell	Brent Hawksley	606	1.5
Wetherby and Easingwold	John Hall	743	1.4
York Outer	David Eadington	260	0.5

== Local election results ==
=== 2015 United Kingdom local elections ===
In local elections, Yorkshire First won five seats on parish/town councils: Wayne Chadburn was elected unopposed to Penistone parish council, Tony and Eddie Devoy were elected in Brierley, and Bob Buxton was elected to Rawdon parish council. They joined Lee Walton, a former independent councillor in Hornsea, who joined Yorkshire First before the election and defended his seat in May 2015 as a Yorkshire First candidate.

Yorkshire First fielded 15 candidates. There were two candidates in Wakefield MDC, one in East Riding of Yorkshire CC, eight in Kingston-upon-Hull, three in Barnsley MDC and one in Leeds MDC on 7 May 2015

Wakefield
Constituency	Candidate	Votes	%
Ackworth, North Emsall & Upton	Martin Roberts	493	6.6%
Wakefield North	Lucy Brown	161	2.6%

East Riding Of Yorkshire CC
Constituency	Candidate	Votes	%
North Holderness	Lee Walton	554	9.2%

Kingston-upon-Hull
Constituency	Candidate	Votes	%
Avenue	Malcolm Johnson	72	1.2%
Beverley	Anthony Morfitt	51	1.2%
Bransholme East	Reece Young	123	4.1%
Bransholme West	Colin Worrall	121	4.8%
Drypool	Martin Clayton	58	1.1%
Orchard Park & Greenwood	Keith Clayton	120	3.0%
Pickering	Peter Mawer	77	1.6%
University	Victoria Butler	163	4.6%

Barnsley MDC
Constituency	Candidate	Votes	%
Cudworth	Tony Devoy	204	4.6%
North East	Eddie Devoy	306	5.5%
Penistone West	Wayne Chadburn	328	5.1%

Leeds
Constituency	Candidate	Votes	%
Headingley	Bob Buxton	70	0.8%

A by-election was held for the Dearne North ward of Barnsley Metropolitan Borough Council on 27 August 2015 following the death of Labour Cllr Dave Sim. Tony Devoy, contested the Dearne North seat on Barnsley Council. He received 9.8% of the votes, 25 votes behind UKIP and over twice as many votes as the Conservatives. Labour held on to its safe seat.

Dearne North By Election
Constituency	Candidate	Votes	%
Dearne North	Tony Devoy	115	9.8%

=== 2016 United Kingdom local elections ===
On 5 May 2016, the party fielded 17 candidates across six local authorities: two in Barnsley, four in Calderdale, two in Rotherham, one in Sheffield and five in Wakefield.

Barnsley
Ward	Candidate	Votes	%
Cudworth	Tony Devoy	338	17.4%
North East	Eddie Devoy	295	11.6%

Calderdale
Ward	Candidate	Votes	%
Greetland & Stainland	Christopher Clinton	60	1.9%
Luddenden Foot	Rod Sutcliffe	109	3.2%
Northowram & Shelf	Daniel Manning	222	7.0%
Skircoat	Darren Stansfield	56	1.5%

Leeds
Ward	Candidate	Votes	%
Guiseley & Rawdon	Bob Buxton	741	10.3%
Killingbeck & Seacroft	John Otley	111	2.5%
Pudsey	Conor O'Neill	211	3.3%

Rotherham
Ward	Candidate	Votes	%
Keppel	Peter Robert Key	268	8.3%
Sitwell	Mick Bower	827	21.2%

Sheffield City Council
Ward	Candidate	Votes	%
Manor Castle	Jack Carrington	399	13.0%

Wakefield
Ward	Candidate	Votes	%
Ackworth, North Emsall & Upton	Martin Roberts	234	6.2%
Altofts & Whitwood	Steve Crookes	363	10.6%
Pontefract North	Arnie Craven	168	5.6%
Wakefield North	Lucy Brown	246	7.6%
Wakefield South	Daniel Cochran	259	7.1%

=== 2017 United Kingdom local elections ===
The Yorkshire Party fielded seven ward candidates at the 2017 local elections: five for Doncaster Metropolitan Borough Council and two for North Yorkshire County Council. Also contesting the Doncaster mayoral election.

Doncaster MBC
Ward	Candidate	Votes	%
Town	Chris Whitwood	1,195	25.7%
Norton & Askern	Jacob Barker	785	9.7%
Conisbrough	Stevie Manion	716	10.4%
Adwick Le Street & Carrcroft	Charlie Bridges	678	10.8%
Wheatley Hills & Intake	Gareth Shanks	728	9.4%

North Yorkshire CC
Ward	Candidate	Votes	%
Newby	Bill Black	108	6.7%
Romanby & Broomfield	Chris Pearson	365	14.7%

=== 2018 United Kingdom local elections ===
The Yorkshire Party fielded twenty four candidates at the 2018 local elections across nine local authorities, succeeding in winning six council seats.

Barnsley
Ward	Candidate	Votes	%	Place
Cudworth	Chris Burrows	161	9.6	3rd
North East	Tony Devoy	593	27.6	2nd

Bradford
Ward	Candidate	Votes	%	Place
Bingley	Mark Barton	230	3.9	4th
Eccleshill	Lara Joy Barras	131	3.8	5th
Idle and Thackley	Jonathan Daniel Stewart Barras	180	4.4	4th

Calderdale
Ward	Candidate	Votes	%	Place
Northowram and Shelf	Daniel Richard Manning	174	5.2	3rd

Harrogate
Ward	Candidate	Votes	%	Place
Harrogate Starbeck	John Philip Hall	37	3.7%	5th
Harrogate Stray	Alexander James Howell	45	3.0%	5th
Ripon Ure Bank	Jack Malcom Render	81	6.6%	5th
Spofforth with Lower Wharfedale	Alexander Hall	58	4.8%	4th

Hull
Ward	Candidate	Votes	%	Place
Bricknell	Alexis Blakeston	57	2.3%	8th

Kirklees
Ward	Candidate	Votes	%	Place
Newsome	Bikatshi Katenga	56	1.3%	5th

Leeds
Ward	Candidate	Votes	%	Place
Guiseley & Rawdon	Bob Buxton	1530	15.8	3rd (party)/ 7th (candidate)
Killingbeck & Seacroft	John Otley	538	10.2	4th (party)/ 5th (candidate)
Pudsey	Conor O'Neill	570	7.3	3rd (party)/ 7th (candidate)

Sheffield
Ward	Candidate	Votes	%	Place
Manor Castle	Jack Carrington	268	9.5	4th
Stockbridge & Upper Don	William Pitt	405	8.3	5th
Walkley	Jack Bannan	183	3.4	4th

Wakefield
Ward	Candidate	Votes	%	Place
Ackworth, North Elmsall and Upton	Martin Paul Roberts	286	8.8	4th
Altofts and Whitwood	Steven Eric Crookes	320	10.1	3rd
Castleford Central and Glasshoughton	Paul Phelps	684	25.2	2nd
Pontefract North	Arnie Craven	266	9.3	3rd
Wakefield North	Lucy Victoria Brown	223	7.3	3rd
Wakefield South	Daniel Mathieson Cochran	234	6.0	3rd

=== 2019 United Kingdom local elections ===
The Yorkshire Party fielded thirty eight candidates at the 2019 local elections across nine local authorities, succeeding in winning six council seats.

Barnsley
Ward	Candidate	Votes	%	Place
Dodworth	Chris Burrows	260	9.1%	3rd
Monk Bretton	Ryan Williams	268	11.8%	3rd
North East	Tony Devoy	467	21.5%	3rd
Penistone East	Lee Goulding	562	16.3%	4th

Bradford
Ward	Candidate	Votes	%	Place
Craven	Peter Kaye	190	3.8%	6th
Eccleshill	Lara Barras	79	2.5%	6th
Shipley	Darren Longhorn	148	2.8%	5th

Calderdale
Ward	Candidate	Votes	%	Place
Brighouse	Philip Lumb	517	15.1%	3rd
Northowram & Shelf	Daniel Manning	342	10.6%	3rd

Leeds
Ward	Candidate	Votes	%	Place
Guiseley & Rawdon	Dr. Bob Buxton	899	12.9%	3rd
Headingley & Hyde Park	Anthony Greaux	67	1.8%	5th
Killingbeck & Seacroft	Matthew Clover	131	3.5%	6th

Sheffield
Ward	Candidate	Votes	%	Place
East Ecclesfield	Alex Robertson	256	5.9%	6th
Manor Castle	Jack Carrington	402	13.2%	4th
Mosborough	Ben Bancroft	330	8.1%	4th
Park & Arbourthorne	Alex Martin	171	5.4%	6th
Stocksbridge & Upper Don	William Pitt	330	6.7%	6th
Walkley	Jack Bannan	116	2.2%	6th

Wakefield
Ward	Candidate	Votes	%	Place
Ackworth, North Elmsall & Upton	Martin Roberts	670	19.0%	2nd
Altofts and Whitwood	Laura Walker	1089	32.5%	2nd
Castleford Central & Glasshoughton	Paul Phelps	689	22.4%	3rd
Pontefract North	Steven Crookes	1148	39.2%	2nd
Wakefield East	Stuart Rick	194	6.4%	5th
Wakefield North	Arnie Craven	302	10.1%	4th
Wakefield South	Daniel Cochran	320	8.5%	4th
Wrenthorpe and Outwood West	Brent Hawksley	274	7.6%	4th

Scarborough
Ward	Candidate	Votes	%	Place
Whitby West Cliff	Lee Derrick	136	8.8%	9th

Selby DC
Ward	Candidate	Votes	%	Place
Byram and Brotherton	Eleanor Jordan	320	45.2%	1st (Elected)
Camblesforth and Carlton	Michael Jordan	702	27.6%	2nd (Elected)
Camblesforth and Carlton	Paul Welburn	799	31.4%	1st (Elected)
Hambleton	Scott Conor	277	49.4%	2nd
Sherburn in Elmet	David Brook	925	24.9%	1st (Elected)

East Riding of Yorkshire
Ward	Candidate	Votes	%	Place
Bridlington South	Tim Norman	907	14.7%	1st (Elected)
Bridlington South	Andy Walker	904	14.7%	2nd (Elected)
Driffield and Rural	Terry Walls	410	4.5%	9th
Mid Holderness	Andy Shead	862	10.2%	5th
North Holderness	Lee Walton	477	8.9%	5th
Wolds Weighton	Peter Hemmermann	1405	12.9%	4th

=== 2021 United Kingdom local elections ===
The Yorkshire Party fielded forty four candidates at the 2021 local elections across twelve local authorities.

Barnsley
Ward	Candidate	Votes	%	Place
St Helen's	Michael Chambers	233	13.5%	3rd

Bradford
Ward	Candidate	Votes	%	Place
Craven	Peter Kaye	430	6.8%	5th
Eccleshill	Jonathan Barras	357	10.2%	4th
Keighley East	Dr. Bob Buxton	230	4.7%	4th
Keighley West	Dom Bower	184	4.8%	3rd
Shipley	Darren Longhorn	191	3.4%	4th
Worth Valley	Joanna Kaye	222	4.7%	5th

Calderdale
Ward	Candidate	Votes	%	Place
Illingworth and Mixenden	Paul Farrell	325	11.3%	3rd

Doncaster
Ward	Candidate	Votes	%	Place
Stainforth & Barnby Dun	George Derx	202	5.7%	8th
Stainforth & Barnby Dun	Rosemarie Squires	208	5.9%	7th
Town	Chris Whitwood	521	6.8%	8th
Wheatley Hills & Intake	Andy Budden	653	8.1%	7th

East Yorkshire
Ward	Candidate	Votes	%	Place
South East Holderness	Ricky Hoggard	317	10.2%	4th

Hull
Ward	Candidate	Votes	%	Place
Drypool	James Steele	69	2.6%	5th

Kirklees
Ward	Candidate	Votes	%	Place
Dewsbury East	Dan Woodlock	138	3.0%	6th
Dewsbury West	Emma Stirling	183	3.0%	4th
Holme Valley South	Will Thompson	206	2.9%	5th

Leeds
Ward	Candidate	Votes	%	Place
Alwoodley	Howard Dews	245	3.2%	4th
Farnley & Wortley	Ian Cowling	315	5.4%	4th
Guiseley & Rawdown	Dr. Bob Buxton	840	9.5%	3rd
Headingley & Hyde Park	Tyler Wilson	99	1.8%	5th
Horsforth	Roland Gilmore	219	2.6%	5th
Otley & Yeadon	Claire Buxton	387	4.6%	5th
Pudsey	Dan Woodlock	265	3.3%	4th
Rothwell	Sean McDonald	359	5.4%	4th

North Yorkshire CC
Ward	Candidate	Votes	%	Place
Harrogate Bilton & Nidd Gorge	John Hall	136	2.9%	5th

Rotherham
Ward	Candidate	Votes	%	Place
Boston Castle	Dennis Bannan	497	6.5%	5th
Keppel	Peter Key	448	6.4%	8th

Sheffield
Ward	Candidate	Votes	%	Place
Burngreave	Alex Martin	101	2.6%	6th
Crookes & Crosspool	Gareth O'Shanks	123	1.8%	5th
East Ecclesfield	Alex Robertson	264	5.5%	4th
Manor Castle	Jack Carrington	303	9.1%	3rd
Nether Edge & Sharrow	John Kennedy	122	1.9%	6th
West Ecclesfield	Jonathan Ogle	352	7.1%	4th

Wakefield
Ward	Candidate	Votes	%	Place
Ackworth, North Elmsall & Upton	Christopher Dawson	447	11.0%	3rd
Castleford Central & Glasshoughton	Paul Phelps	389	11.6%	4th
Featherstone	James Craven	292	8.4%	3rd
Pontefract North	Ryan Kett	628	17.5%	3rd
Pontefract South	Trevor Peasant	390	9.5%	3rd
South Elmsall & South Kirkby	Sarah Mansfield	312	9.5%	3rd
Stanley & Outwood	Brent Hawksley	316	7.1%	3rd
Wakefield North	Andy Mack	263	7.2%	4th
Wakefield South	Daniel Cochran	267	6.3%	4th
Wrenthorpe & Outwood West	Richard Bentley	339	7.7%	3rd

=== 2022 United Kingdom local elections ===
The Yorkshire Party fielded thirty four candidates at the 2022 local elections across seven local authorities.

Barnsley
Ward	Candidate	Votes	%	Place
Cudworth	Tony Devoy	328	17.9%	2nd

North Yorkshire CC
Ward	Candidate	Votes	%	Place
Skipton North and Embsay-with-Eastby	Phil Street	95	4.4%	5th
Pickering	George Mueller-Waite	50	2.4%	5th
Whitby West	Lee Derrick	111	6.3%	4th
Pateley Bridge & Nidderdale	Allison Harris	65	3.5%	3rd
Spofforth with Lower Wharefedale & Tockwih	John Hall	158	9.2%	3rd

Bradford
Ward	Candidate	Votes	%	Place
Bolton and Undercliffe	Wendy Barras	335	10.4%	3rd
Craven	Peter Kaye	226	3.7%	4th
Eccleshill	Jonathan Barras	309	9.3%	3rd
Idle and Thackley	Lara Barras	147	3.4%	5th
Keighley Central	Bob Buxton	158	2.0%	4th
Keighley West	Dom Atlas	118	3.4%	4th
Shipley	Darren Longhorn	160	3.0%	4th

Kirklees
Ward	Candidate	Votes	%	Place
Newsome	Bikatshi Katenga	68	1.7%	5th

Leeds
Ward	Candidate	Votes	%	Place
Adel & Wharefedale	Corey Robinson	127	1.6%	5th
Alwoodley	Howard Dews	137	1.8%	5th
Calverley & Farsley	Robert Lees	225	3.0%	5th
Guiseley & Rawdon	Bob Buxton	703	8.5%	3rd
Horsforth	Ian Cowling	330	4.3%	9th
Otley & Yeadon	Claire Buxton	405	5.4%	5th

Sheffield
Ward	Candidate	Votes	%	Place
Birley	Alex Martin	310	9.8%	3rd
Manor Castle	Jack Carrington	307	9.9%	4th
Park & Arbourthorne	Gareth O'Shanks	259	7.8%	5th
Richmond	Dennis Bannan	290	8.8%	4th

Wakefield
Ward	Candidate	Votes	%	Place
Castleford Central and Glasshoughton	Paul Phelps	310	16.0%	3rd
Horbury and South Ossett	Ryan Kett	183	4.2%	4th
Ossett	Deborah Dawson	317	7.5%	4th
Pontefract North	Chris Dawson	562	17.0%	3rd
Pontefract South	James Craven	262	6.8%	3rd
Stanley and Outwood East	Brent Hawksley	326	8.2%	3rd
Wakefield North	Andy Mack	222	6.3%	3rd
Wakefield Rural	David Herdson	428	8.6%	3rd
Wakefield South	Daniel Cochran	212	5.4%	3rd
Wakefield West	Richard Bentley	245	7.7%	3rd

Kirklees
Ward	Candidate	Votes	%	Place
Newsome	Bikatshi Katenga	61	1.8%	5th

=== 2023 United Kingdom local elections ===
The Yorkshire Party fielded thirty eight candidates at the 2023 local elections across seven local authorities.

Barnsley
Ward	Candidate	Votes	%	Place
Central	Steve Bullcock	456	25.2%	2nd
Darton West	Simon Biltcliffe	274	11.6%	4th
North East	Tony Devoy	188	9.4%	4th

Bradford
Ward	Candidate	Votes	%	Place
Bolton & Undercliffe	Wendy Barras	165	4.8%	5th
Bowling & Barkerend	Kyle Wood	143	4.2%	5th
Bradford Moor	William JG Grant	68	1.5%	4th
Craven	Peter Kaye	280	4.9%	4th
Eccleshill	Jonathan Barras	152	4.6%	4th
Great Horton	William J Grant	110	3.3%	6th
Idle and Thackley	Lara Barras	161	3.8%	4th
Little Horton	Darren Longhorn	138	4.3%	2nd
Tong	Baz Inman	75	2.9%	5th
Wibsey	Bob Buxton	116	4.4%	5th

East Riding of Yorkshire
Ward	Candidate	Votes	%	Place
Bridlington South	Rick Arrand	576	28.9%	3rd (Elected)
Bridlington South	Tim Norman	699	35.0%	2nd (Elected)
Bridlington South	Andy Walker	762	38.2%	1st (Elected)
East Wolds & Coastal	Peter Garforth	451	12.6%	8th
South East Holderness	Ricky Hoggard	605	21.5%	7th
Wolds Weighton	Peter Hemmerman	1033	24.2%	4th

Leeds
Ward	Candidate	Votes	%	Place
Alwoodley	Howard Dews	164	2.5%	5th
Armley	Niamh McDonald	129	3.0%	4th
Calverley & Farsley	Rob Lees	250	3.5%	4th
Guiseley & Rawdon	Bob Buxton	591	7.5%	3rd
Horsforth	Ian Cowling	241	3.2%	5th
Moortown	William Stephens	226	3.3%	5th
Otley & Yeadon	Claire Buxton	197	2.8%	5th
Rothwell	Sean McDonald	274	4.9%	4th

Sheffield
Ward	Candidate	Votes	%	Place
City	Gareth Shanks	45	2.2%	6th
Manor Castle	Jack Carrington	434	7.8%	4th

Wakefield
Ward	Candidate	Votes	%	Place
Castleford Central & Glasshoughton	Paul Phelps	435	16.3%	2nd
Crofton, Ryhill & Walton	Dan Cochran	280	8.1%	3rd
Ossett	Simon Biltcliffe	484	14.4%	3rd
Pontefract North	Chris Dawson	375	12.8%	3rd
Stanley & Outwood East	Brent Hawksley	273	7.5%	4th
Wakefield North	Andy Mack	222	7.5%	4th
Wakefield Rural	David Herdson	494	12.1%	3rd

York
Ward	Candidate	Votes	%	Place
Huntingdon & North Earswick	James Howard	154	1.6%	12th

== Mayoral election results ==
=== Directly elected mayor of Doncaster ===
Chris Whitwood was the Yorkshire Party mayoral candidate in Doncaster in 2017. He saved his deposit.

Date of Election	Local Authority	Candidate	Votes	%
4 May 2017	Doncaster Metropolitan Borough Council	Chris Whitwood	3,235	5.04

=== Mayor of South Yorkshire ===
At the 2018 election for the newly created mayoral position, the Yorkshire Party was fourth out of seven candidates, beating the Green Party and English Democrats candidates. The party improved its performance at the following election in 2022, overtaking the Liberal Democrats into third place and narrowly missing out on a place in the second round of the vote to the Conservatives.

Date of Election	Local Authority	Candidate	Votes	%
3 May 2018	Sheffield City Region Combined Authority	Mick Bower	22,318	8.6
5 May 2022	South Yorkshire Mayoral Combined Authority	Simon Biltcliffe	34,857	13.4

=== Mayor of West Yorkshire ===
Date of Election	Local Authority	Candidate	Votes	%
6 May 2021	West Yorkshire	Bob Buxton	58,851	9.7

== European Parliament results ==
=== 2014 European Parliament election ===
The European Parliament election was held in the UK on 22 May 2014.

Constituency	Candidates	Votes	%	Results	Notes
Yorkshire and the Humber	Stewart Arnold, Richard Carter, Richard Honnoraty	19,017	1.5	None elected	Multi-member constituencies; party list

=== 2019 European Parliament election ===
The European Parliament election was held in the UK for the final time on Thursday 23 May 2019.

Constituency	Candidates	Votes	%	Results	Notes
Yorkshire and the Humber	Chris Whitwood, Mike Jordan, Jack Carrington, Laura Walker, Bob Buxton, Dan Cochran	50,842	3.9	None elected	Multi-member constituencies; party list
