= Parliamentary constituencies in South Yorkshire =

The ceremonial county of South Yorkshire is divided into 14 parliamentary constituencies: 5 borough constituencies and 9 county constituencies, one of which is partly in the District of North Lincolnshire.

Sheffield Hallam was the only non-Labour South Yorkshire seat for many years, and was held by Nick Clegg for 12 years, until Labour gained the seat in 2017. For a 22-year period spanning 1997–2019, the Conservatives had no seats in South Yorkshire, until the 2019 election, when they gained three. In the 1980s, the region's socialist activity (particularly in local government) led to it being referred to as the "People's Republic of South Yorkshire", it being dominated by Labour, a party with a strong socialist tradition. However, it was not until 2017 that every seat in South Yorkshire was won by Labour, a feat which was not repeated at the subsequent 2019 election. At the 2024 general election Labour regained all South Yorkshire constituencies.

== Constituencies ==
† Conservative ‡ Labour ¤ Liberal Democrat # Reform UK ¥ Green

Constituency (Note: BC denotes borough constituency, CC denotes county constituency.)	Electorate	Majority (Note: The majority is the number of votes the winning candidate receives more than their nearest rival.)	Member of Parliament	Nearest Opposition	Electoral wards	Map
Barnsley North CC	78,274	7,811	Dan Jarvis‡	Robert Lomas#	Barnsley Metropolitan Borough Council: Central, Cudworth, Darton East, Darton West, Monk Bretton, North East, Old Town, Royston, St. Helens.	Map showing the location of the Barnsley North constituency in South Yorkshire under the boundaries created by the 2023 boundary review and first used at the 2024 general election.
Barnsley South CC	75,853	4,748	Stephanie Peacock‡	David White#	Barnsley Metropolitan Borough Council: Darfield, Dearne North, Dearne South, Hoyland Milton, Kingstone, Rockingham, Stairfoot, Wombwell, Worsbrough.	Map showing the location of the Barnsley South constituency in South Yorkshire under the boundaries created by the 2023 boundary review and first used at the 2024 general election.
Doncaster Central CC	74,678	9,551	Sally Jameson‡	Nick Allen†	City of Doncaster Council: Armthorpe, Balby South, Bessacarr, Edenthorpe and Kirk Sandall, Hexthorpe and Balby North, Tickhill and Wadworth, Town, Wheatley Hills and Intake.	Map showing the location of the Doncaster Central constituency in South Yorkshire under the boundaries created by the 2023 boundary review and first used at the 2024 general election.
Doncaster East and the Isle of Axholme CC (Part)	70,154	2,311	Lee Pitcher‡	Nick Fletcher†	City of Doncaster Council: Finningley, Hatfield, Rossington and Bawtry, Thorne and Moorends. North Lincolnshire Council: Axholme Central, Axholme North, Axholme South.	Map showing the location of the Doncaster East and the Isle of Axholme constituency in South Yorkshire under the boundaries created by the 2023 boundary review and first used at the 2024 general election.
Doncaster North CC	69,759	9,216	Ed Miliband‡	Glenn Bluff†	City of Doncaster Council: Adwick le Street and Carcroft, Bentley, Mexborough, Norton and Askern, Roman Ridge, Sprotbrough, Stainforth and Barnby Dun	Map showing the location of the Doncaster North constituency in South Yorkshire under the boundaries created by the 2023 boundary review and first used at the 2024 general election.
Penistone and Stocksbridge CC	70,435	8,739	Marie Tidball‡	Miriam Cates†	Barnsley Metropolitan Borough Council: Dodworth, Penistone East, Penistone West. Sheffield City Council: East Ecclesfield, Stocksbridge and Upper Don, West Ecclesfield.	Map showing the location of the Penistone and Stocksbridge constituency in South Yorkshire under the boundaries created by the 2023 boundary review and first used at the 2024 general election.
Rawmarsh and Conisbrough CC	69,133	6,908	John Healey‡	Adam Wood#	City of Doncaster Council: Conisbrough, Edlington and Warmsworth. Rotherham Metropolitan Borough Council: Bramley and Ravenfield, Hoober, Kilnhurst and Swinton East, Rawmarsh East, Rawmarsh West, Swinton Rockingham, Wath.	Map showing the location of the Rawmarsh and Conisbrough constituency in South Yorkshire under the boundaries created by the 2023 boundary review and first used at the 2024 general election.
Rother Valley CC	69,459	998	Jake Richards‡	Alexander Stafford†	Rotherham Metropolitan Borough Council: Anston and Woodsetts, Aston and Todwick, Aughton and Swallownest, Dinnington, Hellaby and Maltby West, Maltby East, Sitwell, Thurcroft and Wickersley South, Wales.	Map showing the location of the Rother Valley constituency in South Yorkshire under the boundaries created by the 2023 boundary review and first used at the 2024 general election.
Rotherham BC	75,929	5,490	Sarah Champion‡	John Cronly#	Rotherham Metropolitan Borough Council: Boston Castle, Brinsworth, Dalton and Thrybergh, Greasbrough, Keppel, Rother Vale, Rotherham East, Rotherham West, Wickersley North.	Map showing the location of the Rotherham constituency in South Yorkshire under the boundaries created by the 2023 boundary review and first used at the 2024 general election.
Sheffield Brightside and Hillsborough BC	70,389	11,600	Gill Furniss‡	Christine Kubo¥	Sheffield City Council: Burngreave, Firth Park, Hillsborough, Shiregreen and Brightside, Southey.	Map showing the location of the Sheffield Brightside and Hillsborough constituency in South Yorkshire under the boundaries created by the 2023 boundary review and first used at the 2024 general election.
Sheffield Central BC	60,594	8,286	Abtisam Mohamed‡	Angela Argenzio¥	Sheffield City Council: Broomhill and Sharrow Vale, City, Nether Edge and Sharrow, Walkley.	Map showing the location of the Sheffield Central constituency in South Yorkshire under the boundaries created by the 2023 boundary review and first used at the 2024 general election.
Sheffield Hallam CC	72,900	8,189	Olivia Blake‡	Shaffaq Mohammed¤	Sheffield City Council: Crookes and Crosspool, Dore and Totley, Ecclesall, Fulwood, Stannington.	Map showing the location of the Sheffield Hallam constituency in South Yorkshire under the boundaries created by the 2023 boundary review and first used at the 2024 general election.
Sheffield Heeley BC	73,452	15,304	Louise Haigh‡	Alexi Diamond¥	Sheffield City Council: Beauchief and Greenhill, Gleadless Valley, Graves Park, Manor Castle, Park and Arbourthorne, Richmond (polling districts UB, UC and UE).	Map showing the location of the Sheffield Heeley constituency in South Yorkshire under the boundaries created by the 2023 boundary review and first used at the 2024 general election.
Sheffield South East BC	74,156	12,458	Clive Betts‡	Caroline Kampila†	Sheffield City Council: Beighton, Birley, Darnall, Mosborough, Richmond (polling districts UA, UD, UF, UG and UH), Woodhouse.	Map showing the location of the Sheffield South East constituency in South Yorkshire under the boundaries created by the 2023 boundary review and first used at the 2024 general election.

== Boundary changes ==
=== 2024 ===
See 2023 review of Westminster constituencies for further details.

Former name	Boundaries 2010–2024	Current name	Boundaries 2024–present
1. Barnsley Central BC; 2. Barnsley East CC; 3. Don Valley CC; 4. Doncaster Central BC; 5. Doncaster North CC; 6. Penistone and Stocksbridge CC; 7. Rother Valley CC; 8. Rotherham BC; 9. Sheffield Central BC; 10. Sheffield South East BC; 11. Sheffield, Brightside and Hillsborough BC; 12. Sheffield, Hallam CC; 13. Sheffield, Heeley BC; 14. Wentworth and Dearne CC	Proposed revised constituencies in South Yorkshire	1. Barnsley North CC; 2. Barnsley South CC; 3. Doncaster Central CC; 4. Doncaster East and the Isle of Axholme CC; 5. Doncaster North CC; 6. Penistone and Stocksbridge CC; 7. Rawmarsh and Conisbrough CC; 8. Rother Valley CC; 9. Rotherham BC; 10. Sheffield Brightside and Hillsborough BC; 11. Sheffield Central BC; 12. Sheffield Hallam CC; 13. Sheffield Heeley BC; 14. Sheffield South East BC	Numbered map of the parliamentary constituencies of South Yorkshire created by the 2023 boundary review and first used at the 2024 UK general election.

For the 2023 review of Westminster constituencies, which redrew the constituency map ahead of the 2024 United Kingdom general election, the Boundary Commission for England opted to combine South Yorkshire with the four unitary authorities which make up the former county of Humberside as a sub-region of the Yorkshire and the Humber Region, resulting in the creation of a new cross-county boundary constituency named Doncaster East and the Isle of Axholme, largely replacing Don Valley. Barnsley Central and Barnsley East were realigned to form Barnsley North and Barnsley South. Changes to Wentworth and Dearne resulted in it being renamed Rawmarsh and Conisbrough.

The following constituencies were proposed:

Containing electoral wards from Barnsley

- Barnsley North
- Barnsley South
- Penistone and Stocksbridge (part)

Containing electoral wards from Doncaster

- Doncaster East and the Isle of Axholme (part also in North Lincolnshire)
- Doncaster North
- Doncaster Central
- Rawmarsh and Conisbrough (part)

Containing electoral wards from Rotherham

- Rawmarsh and Conisbrough (part)
- Rother Valley
- Rotherham

Containing electoral wards from Sheffield

- Penistone and Stocksbridge (part)
- Sheffield Brightside and Hillsborough
- Sheffield Central
- Sheffield Hallam
- Sheffield Heeley
- Sheffield South East

=== 2010 ===
Under the fifth periodic review of Westminster constituencies, the Boundary Commission for England decided to reduce the number of seats in South Yorkshire from 15 to 14, leading to significant changes. Barnsley East and Mexborough, Barnsley West and Penistone, Sheffield, Brightside, and Sheffield, Hillsborough were abolished and replaced by Barnsley East, Penistone and Stocksbridge, and Sheffield, Brightside and Hillsborough. Sheffield, Attercliffe was renamed Sheffield South East, and Wentworth was renamed Wentworth and Dearne.

Name 1997–2010	Boundaries 1997–2010	Name 2010–2024	Boundaries 2010–2024
1. Barnsley Central BC; 2. Barnsley East and Mexborough CC; 3. Barnsley West and Penistone CC; 4. Doncaster Central BC; 5. Doncaster North CC; 6. Don Valley CC; 7. Rother Valley CC; 8. Rotherham BC; 9. Sheffield, Attercliffe BC; 10. Sheffield, Brightside BC; 11. Sheffield Central BC; 12. Sheffield, Hallam CC; 13. Sheffield, Heeley BC; 14. Sheffield, Hillsborough CC; 15. Wentworth CC	Parliamentary constituencies in South Yorkshire	1. Barnsley Central BC; 2. Barnsley East CC; 3. Don Valley CC; 4. Doncaster Central BC; 5. Doncaster North CC; 6. Penistone and Stocksbridge CC; 7. Rother Valley CC; 8. Rotherham BC; 9. Sheffield Central BC; 10. Sheffield South East BC; 11. Sheffield, Brightside and Hillsborough BC; 12. Sheffield, Hallam CC; 13. Sheffield, Heeley BC; 14. Wentworth and Dearne CC	Proposed revised constituencies in South Yorkshire

== Results history ==
Primary data source: House of Commons research briefing – General election results from 1918 to 2019

=== 2024 ===
The number of votes cast for each political party who fielded candidates in constituencies comprising South Yorkshire in the 2024 general election were as follows:

Party	Votes	%	Change from 2019	Seats	Change from 2019
Labour	249,037	47.4%	▲5.1%	14	▲3
Conservative	88,268	16.8%	▼15.5%	0	▼3
Reform	76,843	14.6%	▲1.0%	0	0
Greens	43,012	8.2%	▲5.9%	0	0
Liberal Democrats	40,758	7.8%	0	0	0
Others	27,778	5.3%	▲3.6%	0	0
Total	525,696	100.0		14	

=== Percentage votes ===
Election year	1983	1987	1992	1997	2001	2005	2010	2015	2017	2019	2024
Labour	48.8	56.0	57.9	62.3	59.0	52.7	42.0	49.5	56.9	42.3	47.4
Conservative	28.0	24.9	27.0	16.7	18.8	18.0	20.6	17.4	29.8	32.3	16.8
Reform	–	–	–	–	–	–	–	–	–	13.6	14.6
Green Party	–	*	*	*	*	*	0.6	2.7	1.2	2.3	8.2
Liberal Democrat^{1}	23.0	18.9	14.5	16.6	18.0	21.4	23.7	8.2	5.9	7.8	7.8
UKIP	–	–	–	*	*	*	4.4	20.8	4.7	*	-
Other	0.2	0.2	0.6	4.4	4.1	8.0	8.7	1.6	1.5	1.7	5.3

^{1}1983 & 1987 – SDP–Liberal Alliance

* Included in Other

=== Seats ===
Election year	1983	1987	1992	1997	2001	2005	2010	2015	2017	2019	2024
Labour	14	14	14	14	14	14	13	13	14	11	14
Conservative	1	1	1	0	0	0	0	0	0	3	0
Liberal Democrat^{1}	0	0	0	1	1	1	1	1	0	0	0
Total	15	15	15	15	15	15	14	14	14	14	14

^{1}1983 & 1987 – SDP–Liberal Alliance

=== Maps ===
1983

1987

1992

1997

2001

2005

2010

2015

2017

2019

2024

== Historical representation by party ==
A cell marked → (with a different colour background to the preceding cell) indicates that the previous MP continued to sit under a new party name.

=== 1983 to 2010 ===
Conservative Labour Liberal Democrats

Constituency	1983	1987	1992	94	96	1997	2001	2005
Barnsley Central	Mason	Illsley						
Barnsley E / Barnsley E & Mexborough (1997)	Patchett				Ennis			
Barnsley West and Penistone	McKay		Clapham					
Don Valley	Redmond					Flint		
Doncaster Central	Walker					Winterton		
Doncaster North	Welsh		Hughes					Miliband
Rother Valley	Barron							
Rotherham	Crowther		Boyce	MacShane				
Sheffield Attercliffe	Duffy		Betts					
Sheffield Brightside	Maynard	Blunkett						
Sheffield Central	Caborn							
Sheffield Hallam	Osborn	Patnick				Allan		Clegg
Sheffield Heeley	Michie						Munn	
Sheffield Hillsborough	Flannery		Jackson					Smith
Wentworth	Hardy					Healey		

=== 2010 to present ===
Change UK Conservative Independent Labour Liberal Democrats

Constituency	2010	10	11	12	12	2015	16	2017	18	19	19	2019	2024
Barnsley Central / Barnsley North (2024)	Illsley	→	Jarvis										
Barnsley East / Barnsley South (2024)	Dugher							Peacock					
Don Valley / Doncaster E & the Isle of Axholme (2024)^{1}	Flint											Fletcher	Pitcher
Doncaster Central	Winterton												Jameson
Doncaster North	Miliband												
Penistone & Stocksbridge	Smith									→	→	Cates	Tidball
Rother Valley	Barron											Stafford	Richards
Rotherham	MacShane	→		→	Champion								
Sheffield South East	Betts												
Sheffield Brightside & Hillsborough	Blunkett					Harpham	Furniss						
Sheffield Central	Blomfield												Mohamed
Sheffield Hallam	Clegg							O'Mara	→			Blake	
Sheffield Heeley	Munn					Haigh							
Wentworth & Dearne / Rawmarsh & Conisbrough (2024)	Healey												

^{1}also includes some areas of Humberside

== See also ==
- List of parliamentary constituencies in Yorkshire and the Humber
