= Jim Ferguson (British politician) =

British businessman and politician

Personal details
- Born: May 1967 (age 59) Inverness, Scotland
- Citizenship: United Kingdom
- Party: Advance UK (since 2025)
- Other political affiliations: Brexit Party (2019)
- Children: 4
- Occupation: Politician; businessman
- Website: jim2win.com

James Alasdair Neil Ferguson-Hannah (born May 1967) is a British businessman and politician. He was formerly involved in the Brexit Party, but is now a member of Advance UK.

== Business career ==
Ferguson served as managing director of The Castle Group, a security firm based in Inverness. In 2014, his firm was fined for placing unlicensed security guards in licensable security roles.

He has served as chair of the advisory board for Crimestoppers Scotland since 2011.

== Political career ==
In 2010, he stood for the Scottish Conservatives in Inverness, Nairn, Badenoch and Strathspey, and placed fourth with 6,278 votes.

Ferguson supported the Brexit Party following its launch in April 2019.

In 2019, he was selected as the Brexit Party in Barnsley East. Over 250 members attended a rally in the town, and party leader Nigel Farage claimed that the party could win both Barnsley East and Barnsley Central. During the election campaign, a local fish and chip shop owner was ordered by the police to cease promising free meals for Brexit Party voters. When the results were announced, Ferguson finished second, 3,217 votes behind the elected Labour Party candidate, Stephanie Peacock.

Ferguson founded and hosts an online news platform, Freedom Train International. In 2024, Reuters denounced misinformation he spread on X which claimed that illegal migrants could join Ireland's national police force, Garda Síochána. That same year, he espoused a conspiracy theory that Bill Gates and the World Health Organization would have the army force people to take vaccines.

Since 2025, Ferguson has served as International Ambassador for Advance UK, a far-right political party led by Ben Habib.

== See also ==
- Brexit Party
- Euroscepticism in the United Kingdom
- Far-right politics in the United Kingdom
