= Barnsley East and Mexborough =

UK Parliament constituency (1997–2010)

Coordinates: 53.531°N 1.361°W

- Former county constituency for the House of Commons
- Boundary of Barnsley East and Mexborough in South Yorkshire in 2005.

- Location of South Yorkshire within England.
- County: South Yorkshire
- Major settlements: Wombwell, Mexborough

1997–2010
- Seats: One
- Created from: Barnsley East
- Replaced by: Barnsley East, Don Valley, Doncaster North

Barnsley East and Mexborough was a Parliamentary constituency in South Yorkshire which returned one Member of Parliament (MP) to the House of Commons of the Parliament of the United Kingdom.

The constituency was created in 1997, partially replacing Barnsley East, and was a safe seat for the Labour Party. At the 2010 general election, it was largely replaced by a re-established Barnsley East constituency.

== Boundaries ==
The Metropolitan Borough of Barnsley wards of Brierley, Darfield, Dearne South, Dearne Thurnscoe, Wombwell North, and Wombwell South, and the Metropolitan Borough of Doncaster wards of Mexborough and Richmond.

Barnsley East and Mexborough constituency covered the eastern part of the Metropolitan Borough of Barnsley and included the town of Mexborough (in the borough of Doncaster). It bordered the constituencies of Barnsley Central, Barnsley West and Penistone, Wentworth, Don Valley, Doncaster Central, Doncaster North, Selby, and Hemsworth.

=== Boundary review ===
Following their review of parliamentary representation in South Yorkshire, the Boundary Commission for England had split the existing Barnsley East seat from Mexborough, to create a smaller modified Barnsley East constituency.

This means the 2005 election was the last for the Barnsley East and Mexborough constituency. The electoral wards used in the formation of the new East division were:

- Cudworth, Darfield, Hoyland Milton, North East, Rockingham, Stairfoot, Wombwell and Worsbrough.

The new Wentworth and Dearne seat included the wards of Dearne North and Dearne South. This area included Bolton-on-Dearne, Goldthorpe and Thurnscoe.

== Members of Parliament ==
The constituency had one Member of Parliament since its creation in 1997, from the Labour Party.

Election	Member	Party
1997	Jeff Ennis	Labour
2010	constituency abolished: see Barnsley East and Don Valley	

== Elections ==
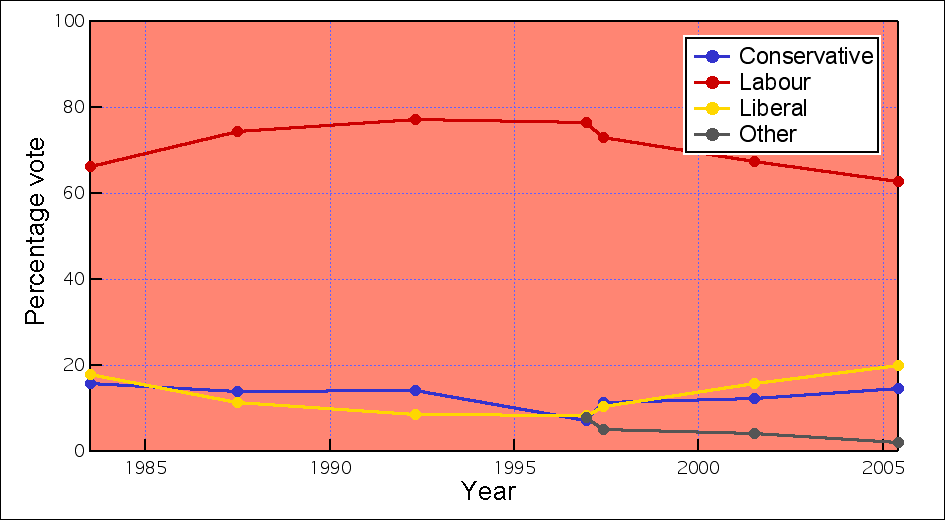
Election results since 1983

=== Elections in the 2000s ===
General election 2005: Barnsley East and Mexborough
Party	Candidate	Votes	%	±%
Labour	Jeff Ennis	20,779	62.9	−4.6
Liberal Democrats	Sharron Brook	6,654	20.1	+4.2
Conservative	Carolyn Abbott	4,853	14.7	+2.3
Socialist Labour	Terry Robinson	740	2.2	0.0
Majority		14,125	42.8	−8.8
Turnout		33,026	49.3	−0.2
Labour hold		Swing	−4.4	

General election 2001: Barnsley East and Mexborough
Party	Candidate	Votes	%	±%
Labour	Jeff Ennis	21,945	67.5	−5.6
Liberal Democrats	Sharron Brook	5,156	15.9	+5.5
Conservative	Matthew Offord	4,024	12.4	+1.0
Socialist Labour	Terry Robinson	722	2.2	−0.6
UKIP	George C. Savage	662	2.0	New
Majority		16,789	51.6	−10.1
Turnout		32,509	49.5	−14.1
Labour hold		Swing	−5.1	

=== Elections in the 1990s ===
General election 1997: Barnsley East and Mexborough
Party	Candidate	Votes	%	±%
Labour	Jeff Ennis	31,699	73.1	−3.3
Conservative	Jane Ellison	4,936	11.4	+4.1
Liberal Democrats	David G. Willis	4,489	10.4	+2.0
Socialist Labour	Ken Capstick	1,213	2.8	−2.5
Referendum	Arthur J. Miles	797	1.8	New
Independent	Julie E. Hyland	201	0.5	0.0
Majority		26,763	61.7	−1.3
Turnout		43,335	63.6	−9.1
Labour win (new seat)				

== See also ==
- List of parliamentary constituencies in South Yorkshire

== Sources ==
- BBC Election 2005
- BBC Vote 2001
- Guardian Unlimited Politics (Election results from 1992 to the present)
- Richard Kimber's Political Science Resources (1983 and 1987 results)
