= Parliamentary constituencies in Yorkshire and the Humber =

List of Parliamentary constituencies in Yorkshire and the Humber region, England

The region (Note: See NUTS 1 statistical regions of England) of Yorkshire and the Humber is divided into 54 parliamentary constituencies which is made up of 23 borough constituencies and 31 county constituencies. Since the general election of July 2024, 43 are represented by Labour MPs, 9 by Conservative MPs, one by a Liberal Democrat MPs, and one by an independent MP.

== Constituencies ==
† Conservative ‡ Labour ¤ Liberal Democrat ♣ Green Party ♠ Independent # Reform UK

Constituency (Note: BC denotes borough constituency, CC denotes county constituency.)	Electorate	Majority (Note: The majority is the number of votes the winning candidate receives more than their nearest rival.)	Member of Parliament	Nearest opposition	County	Constituency map
Barnsley North CC	78,267	7,811	Dan Jarvis‡	Robert Lomas#	South Yorkshire	
Barnsley South CC	75,850	4,748	Stephanie Peacock‡	David White#	South Yorkshire	
Beverley and Holderness CC	71,994	124	Graham Stuart†	Margaret Pinder‡	East Riding of Yorkshire (prev. Humberside)	
Bradford East BC	75,167	6,189	Imran Hussain‡	Talat Sajawal♠	West Yorkshire	
Bradford South BC	71,002	4,362	Judith Cummins‡	Ian Eglin#	West Yorkshire	
Bradford West BC	77,897	707	Naz Shah‡	Muhammed Islam♠	West Yorkshire	
Bridlington and The Wolds CC	72,931	3,125	Charlie Dewhirst†	Sarah Carter‡	East Riding of Yorkshire (prev. Humberside)	
Brigg and Immingham CC	74,297	3,243	Martin Vickers†	Najmul Hussain‡	Lincolnshire (prev. Humberside)	
Calder Valley CC	77,364	8,991	Josh Fenton-Glynn‡	Vanessa Lee†	West Yorkshire	
Colne Valley CC	72,638	4,963	Paul Davies‡	Jason McCartney†	West Yorkshire	
Dewsbury and Batley BC	71,685	6,934	Iqbal Mohamed♠	Heather Iqbal‡	West Yorkshire	
Doncaster Central CC	74,678	9,551	Sally Jameson‡	Nick Allen†	South Yorkshire	
Doncaster East and the Isle of Axholme CC	70,154	2,311	Lee Pitcher‡	Nick Fletcher†	Lincolnshire (prev. Humberside) / South Yorkshire	
Doncaster North CC	69,759	9,126	Ed Miliband‡	Glenn Bluff†	South Yorkshire	
Goole and Pocklington CC	78,287	3,572	David Davis†	Liam Draycott‡	East Riding of Yorkshire (prev. Humberside)	
Great Grimsby and Cleethorpes BC	78,875	4,803	Melanie Onn‡	Oliver Freeston#	Lincolnshire (prev. Humberside)	
Halifax CC	77,516	6,269	Kate Dearden‡	Hazel Sharp†	West Yorkshire	
Harrogate and Knaresborough CC	77,970	8,238	Tom Gordon¤	Andrew Jones†	North Yorkshire	
Huddersfield BC	77,795	4,533	Harpreet Uppal‡	Andrew Cooper♣	West Yorkshire	
Keighley and Ilkley CC	74,367	1,625	Robbie Moore†	John Grogan‡	West Yorkshire	
Kingston upon Hull East BC (Note: Many sources list the Kingston upon Hull constituencies as Hull, following the city council's own practice. However, the official names have not adopted the short form.)	70,650	3,920	Karl Turner‡	Neil Hunter#	East Riding of Yorkshire (prev. Humberside)	
Kingston upon Hull North and Cottingham BC	75,280	10,769	Diana Johnson‡	Martin Baker#	East Riding of Yorkshire (prev. Humberside)	
Kingston upon Hull West and Haltemprice BC	73,252	8,979	Emma Hardy‡	Julie Peck#	East Riding of Yorkshire (prev. Humberside)	
Leeds Central and Headingley BC	70,554	8,422	Alex Sobel‡	Chris Foren♣	West Yorkshire	
Leeds East CC	76,207	11,265	Richard Burgon‡	David Dresser#	West Yorkshire	
Leeds North East BC	70,178	16,083	Fabian Hamilton‡	Chris Whiteside†	West Yorkshire	
Leeds North West CC	71,592	11,896	Katie White‡	Thomas Averre†	West Yorkshire	
Leeds South BC	75,953	11,279	Hilary Benn‡	Ed Carlisle♣	West Yorkshire	
Leeds South West and Morley BC	71,854	8,423	Mark Sewards‡	Andrea Jenkyns†	West Yorkshire	
Leeds West and Pudsey BC	70,069	12,392	Rachel Reeves‡	Lee Farmer†	West Yorkshire	
Normanton and Hemsworth CC	75,645	6,662	Jon Trickett‡	Callum Bushrod#	West Yorkshire	
Ossett and Denby Dale CC	72,312	4,542	Jade Botterill‡	Mark Eastwood†	West Yorkshire	
Penistone and Stocksbridge CC	70,770	8,739	Marie Tidball‡	Miriam Cates†	South Yorkshire	
Pontefract, Castleford and Knottingley CC	74,618	6,630	Yvette Cooper‡	John Thomas#	West Yorkshire	
Rawmarsh and Conisbrough CC	69,132	6,908	John Healey‡	Adam Wood#	South Yorkshire	
Richmond and Northallerton CC	73,888	12,185	Rishi Sunak†	Tom Wilson‡	North Yorkshire	
Rother Valley CC	69,460	998	Jake Richards‡	Alexander Stafford†	South Yorkshire	
Rotherham BC	75,929	5,490	Sarah Champion‡	John Cronly#	South Yorkshire	
Scarborough and Whitby CC	74,558	5,408	Alison Hume‡	Roberto Weeden-Sanz†	North Yorkshire	
Scunthorpe CC	74,263	3,542	Nic Dakin‡	Holly Mumby-Croft†	Lincolnshire (prev. Humberside)	
Selby CC	78,055	10,195	Keir Mather‡	Charles Richardson†	North Yorkshire / West Yorkshire	
Sheffield Brightside and Hillsborough BC	70,453	11,600	Gill Furniss‡	Christine Kubo♣	South Yorkshire	
Sheffield Central BC	60,777	8,286	Abtisam Mohamed‡	Angela Argenzio♣	South Yorkshire	
Sheffield Hallam CC	73,033	8,189	Olivia Blake‡	Shaffaq Mohammed¤	South Yorkshire	
Sheffield Heeley BC	73,359	15,304	Louise Haigh‡	Alexi Dimond♣	South Yorkshire	
Sheffield South East BC	74,194	12,458	Clive Betts‡	Caroline Kampila†	South Yorkshire	
Shipley CC	74,130	8,603	Anna Dixon‡	Philip Davies†	West Yorkshire	
Skipton and Ripon CC	79,251	1,650	Julian Smith†	Malcolm Birks‡	North Yorkshire	
Spen Valley BC	72,642	6,188	Kim Leadbeater‡	Sarah Wood#	West Yorkshire	
Thirsk and Malton CC	78,484	7,550	Kevin Hollinrake†	Lisa Banes‡	North Yorkshire	
Wakefield and Rothwell BC	75,067	9,346	Simon Lightwood‡	David Dews#	West Yorkshire	
Wetherby and Easingwold CC	74,334	4,846	Alec Shelbrooke†	Ben Pickles‡	North Yorkshire / West Yorkshire	
York Central BC	79,557	19,154	Rachael Maskell‡	Richard Hudson†	North Yorkshire	
York Outer CC	76,228	9,391	Luke Charters‡	Julian Sturdy†	North Yorkshire	

== Proposed boundary changes ==
See 2023 Periodic Review of Westminster constituencies for further details.

Following the abandonment of the Sixth Periodic Review (the 2018 review), the Boundary Commission for England formally launched the 2023 Review on 5 January 2021. The Commission calculated that the number of seats to be allocated to the Yorkshire and the Humber region would be unchanged, at 54. Initial proposals were published on 8 June 2021 and, following two periods of public consultation, revised proposals were published on 8 November 2022. The final proposals were published on 28 June 2023.

Under the proposals, the following constituencies for the region came into effect at the 2024 general election:

Constituency	Electorate	Ceremonial county	Local authority
Barnsley North CC	76,794	South Yorkshire	Barnsley
Barnsley South CC	75,896	South Yorkshire	Barnsley
Beverley and Holderness CC	71,102	East Riding of Yorkshire	East Riding of Yorkshire
Bradford East BC	72,150	West Yorkshire	Bradford
Bradford South BC	70,890	West Yorkshire	Bradford
Bradford West BC	71,258	West Yorkshire	Bradford
Bridlington and The Wolds CC	72,501	East Riding of Yorkshire	East Riding of Yorkshire
Brigg and Immingham CC	71,628	Lincolnshire	North East Lincolnshire / North Lincolnshire
Calder Valley CC	75,987	West Yorkshire	Calderdale
Colne Valley CC	71,518	West Yorkshire	Kirklees
Dewsbury and Batley BC	70,226	West Yorkshire	Kirklees
Doncaster Central CC	75,007	South Yorkshire	Doncaster
Doncaster East and the Isle of Axholme CC	70,113	Lincolnshire / South Yorkshire	Doncaster / North Lincolnshire
Doncaster North CC	71,739	South Yorkshire	Doncaster
Goole and Pocklington CC	76,337	East Riding of Yorkshire	East Riding of Yorkshire
Great Grimsby and Cleethorpes BC	77,050	Lincolnshire	North East Lincolnshire
Halifax CC	74,563	West Yorkshire	Calderdale
Harrogate and Knaresborough CC	75,800	North Yorkshire	North Yorkshire
Huddersfield BC	76,044	West Yorkshire	Kirklees
Keighley and Ilkley CC	72,954	West Yorkshire	Bradford
Kingston upon Hull East BC	72,622	East Riding of Yorkshire	Kingston upon Hull
Kingston upon Hull North and Cottingham BC	76,039	East Riding of Yorkshire	East Riding of Yorkshire / Kingston upon Hull
Kingston upon Hull West and Haltemprice BC	74,321	East Riding of Yorkshire	East Riding of Yorkshire / Kingston upon Hull
Leeds Central and Headingley BC	75,396	West Yorkshire	Leeds
Leeds East CC	75,330	West Yorkshire	Leeds
Leeds North East BC	70,976	West Yorkshire	Leeds
Leeds North West CC	71,607	West Yorkshire	Leeds
Leeds South BC	74,726	West Yorkshire	Leeds
Leeds South West and Morley BC	71,376	West Yorkshire	Leeds
Leeds West and Pudsey BC	70,270	West Yorkshire	Leeds
Normanton and Hemsworth CC	75,388	West Yorkshire	Wakefield
Ossett and Denby Dale CC	71,595	West Yorkshire	Kirklees / Wakefield
Penistone and Stocksbridge CC	71,377	South Yorkshire	Barnsley / Sheffield
Pontefract, Castleford and Knottingley CC	72,751	West Yorkshire	Wakefield
Rawmarsh and Conisbrough CC	70,272	South Yorkshire	Doncaster / Rotherham
Richmond and Northallerton CC	72,744	North Yorkshire	North Yorkshire
Rother Valley CC	70,814	South Yorkshire	Rotherham
Rotherham BC	75,345	South Yorkshire	Rotherham
Scarborough and Whitby CC	73,862	North Yorkshire	North Yorkshire
Scunthorpe CC	74,278	Lincolnshire	North Lincolnshire
Selby CC	74,761	North Yorkshire / West Yorkshire	Leeds / North Yorkshire
Sheffield Brightside and Hillsborough BC	71,154	South Yorkshire	Sheffield
Sheffield Central BC	70,453	South Yorkshire	Sheffield
Sheffield Hallam CC	76,637	South Yorkshire	Sheffield
Sheffield Heeley BC	74,614	South Yorkshire	Sheffield
Sheffield South East BC	76,223	South Yorkshire	Sheffield
Shipley CC	74,095	West Yorkshire	Bradford
Skipton and Ripon CC	76,758	North Yorkshire	North Yorkshire
Spen Valley BC	72,169	West Yorkshire	Kirklees
Thirsk and Malton CC	76,623	North Yorkshire	North Yorkshire
Wakefield and Rothwell BC	73,968	West Yorkshire	Leeds / Wakefield
Wetherby and Easingwold CC	71,455	North Yorkshire / West Yorkshire	North Yorkshire / Leeds
York Central BC	74,854	North Yorkshire	York
York Outer CC	72,720	North Yorkshire	York

== 2024 results ==
The number of votes cast for each political party who fielded candidates in constituencies comprising the Yorkshire and the Humber region in the 2024 general election were as follows:

Party	Votes	Of total (%)	Difference from 2019	Seats	Difference from 2019	
Party	Votes	Of total (%)	Difference from 2019	Seats	Actual	Notional
Labour	907,767	40.9	▲2.0	43	▲15	▲16
Conservative	506,450	22.8	▼20.3	9	▼17	▼18
Reform UK	371,658	16.7	▲10.8	0	0	0
Green	167,514	7.5	▲5.3	0	0	0
Liberal Democrats	158,326	7.1	▼0.9	1	▲1	▲1
Others	110,232	5.0	▲3.1	1	▲1	▲1
Total	2,221,947	100.0		54	0	

== Results history ==
Primary data source: House of Commons research briefing - General election results from 1918 to 2019

=== Percentage votes ===
Yorkshire and the Humber votes %

Key
- CON - Conservative Party, including National Liberal Party up to 1966
- LAB - Labour Party, including Labour and Co-operative Party
- LIB - Liberal Party up to 1979; SDP-Liberal Alliance 1983 & 1987; Liberal Democrats from 1992
- UKIP - UK Independence Party 2010 to 2017 (included in Other up to 2005 and from 2019)
- REF - Reform UK (2019 - Brexit Party)
- GRN - Green Party of England and Wales (included in Other up to 2005)

=== Seats ===
Yorkshire and the Humber seats won

Key
- CON - Conservative Party, including National Liberal Party up to 1966
- LAB - Labour Party, including Labour and Co-operative Party
- LIB - Liberal Party up to 1979; SDP-Liberal Alliance 1983 & 1987; Liberal Democrats from 1992
- OTH - 2024 - Independent (Iqbal Mohamed)

== See also ==
- List of United Kingdom Parliament constituencies
- List of parliamentary constituencies in Humberside
- List of parliamentary constituencies in North Yorkshire
- List of parliamentary constituencies in South Yorkshire
- List of parliamentary constituencies in West Yorkshire
