= 1996 Barnsley East by-election =

UK parliamentary by-election

- 12 December 1996
- Turnout: 33.7% (▼39.2 pp)
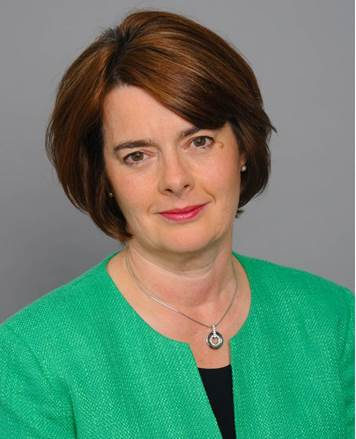
	First party	Second party
Candidate	Jeff Ennis	David Willis
Party	Labour	Liberal Democrats
Popular vote	13,683	1,502
Percentage	76.4%	8.4%
Swing	▼0.8 pp	▼0.2 pp
	Third party	Fourth party
Candidate	Jane Ellison	Ken Chapstick
Party	Conservative	Socialist Labour
Popular vote	1,299	949
Percentage	7.3%	5.3%
Swing	▼6.9 pp	New
MP before election
Terry Patchett
Labour
Elected MP
Jeff Ennis
Labour

A by-election for the United Kingdom parliamentary constituency of Barnsley East was held on 12 December 1996 following the death of the incumbent Labour Party Member of Parliament (MP) Terry Patchett. Barnsley council leader Jeff Ennis held the seat for Labour on an increased majority of 68% and more than three quarters of the votes, despite a low voter turnout.

Despite a slight reduction in the vote for the Liberal Democrats, they overtook the Conservative Party for second place. The Socialist Labour Party, on their leader Arthur Scargill's home territory, was able to save its deposit.

As a result of Labour's hold, the Conservative government fell into minority status, losing the majority the party had held for seventeen years.

Barnsley East by-election, 1996
Party	Candidate	Votes	%	±%
Labour	Jeff Ennis	13,683	76.4	−0.8
Liberal Democrats	David Willis	1,502	8.4	−0.2
Conservative	Jane Ellison	1,299	7.3	−6.9
Socialist Labour	Ken Capstick	949	5.3	New
UKIP	Nikolai Tolstoy	378	2.1	New
Socialist Equality	Julie Hyland	89	0.5	New
Majority		12,181	68.0	+5.0
Turnout		17,900	33.7	−39.0
Labour hold		Swing		

General election 1992: Barnsley East
Party	Candidate	Votes	%	±%
Labour	Terry Patchett	30,346	77.2	+2.7
Conservative	John Proctor	5,569	14.2	+0.2
Liberal Democrats	Sylvia Anginotti	3,399	8.6	−2.9
Majority		24,777	63.0	+2.5
Turnout		39,314	72.7	+0.1
Labour hold		Swing	+1.3	
