= Barnsley South =

UK Parliament constituency (since 2024)

- County constituency for the House of Commons
- Boundaries since 2024
- Boundary of Barnsley South in Yorkshire and the Humber
- County: South Yorkshire
- Electorate: 75,635
- Borough: Barnsley
- Major settlements: Barnsley; Wombwell; Worsbrough; Hoyland; Dearne Valley; Darfield

Current constituency
- Created: 2024
- Member of Parliament: Stephanie Peacock (Labour)
- Seats: One
- Created from: Barnsley East; Wentworth and Dearne; Barnsley Central

Barnsley South is a constituency of the House of Commons in the UK Parliament. Created as a result of the 2023 Periodic Review of Westminster constituencies, it was first contested at the 2024 general election. It is represented by Stephanie Peacock of the Labour Party, who was MP for the predecessor seat of Barnsley East from 2017 to 2024.

== Constituency profile ==
The constituency is located in South Yorkshire, covering the south-eastern part of the Metropolitan Borough of Barnsley. The constituency contains southern parts of the large market town of Barnsley, along with other towns, villages and rural areas to its south-east. Other settlements in the constituency include the towns of Hoyland and Wombwell and the large villages of Worsbrough, Darfield, Thurnscoe and Bolton upon Dearne.

The area has an industrial heritage and a history of coal mining. On average, residents of the constituency are considerably less wealthy and less likely to be degree-educated than the rest of Yorkshire and the country as a whole. White people make up 97% of the population. At the most recent borough council election in 2024, voters in the constituency elected primarily Labour Party councillors. It is estimated that over 70% of Barnsley South voted in favour of leaving the European Union in the 2016 referendum, making it one of the top ten most Brexit-supporting constituencies out of 650 nationwide.

== Boundaries ==
The constituency is composed of the following wards of the Metropolitan Borough of Barnsley (as they existed on 1 December 2020):

- Darfield, Dearne North, Dearne South, Hoyland Milton, Kingstone, Rockingham, Stairfoot, Wombwell, and Worsbrough from Barnsley East.

It comprises the bulk of Barnsley East (excluding the Cudworth and North East wards), with addition of the two Dearne wards from Wentworth and Dearne and the Kingstone ward from Barnsley Central. (All three predecessor constituencies were abolished under the 2023 review).

== Members of Parliament ==
Barnsley East prior to 2024

Election	Member	Party
2024	Stephanie Peacock	Labour

== Elections ==
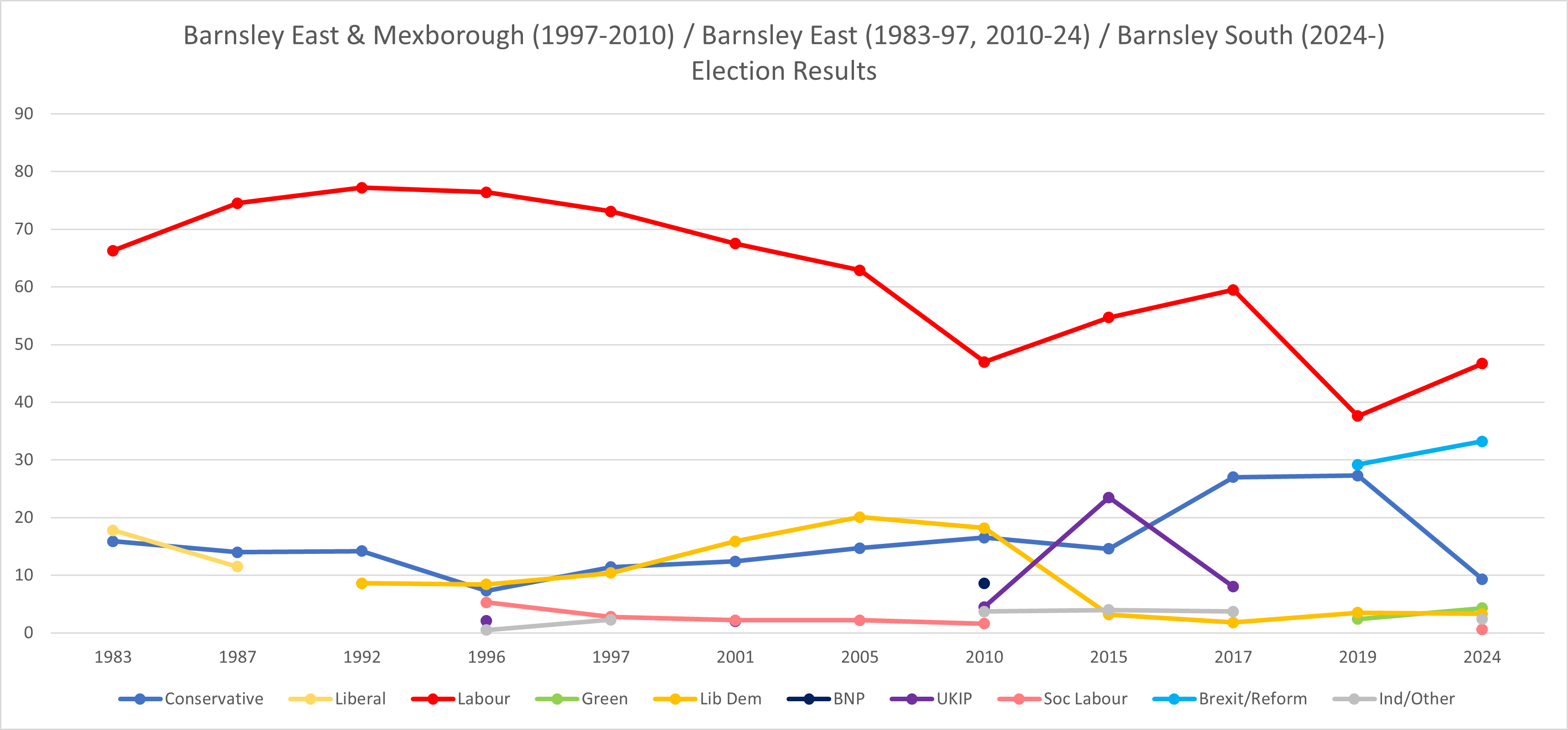
Barnsley East & Mexborough (1997−2010) / Barnsley East (1983−1997, 2010−2024) / Barnsley South (2024−) Election Results

=== Elections in the 2020s ===
General election 2024: Barnsley South
Party	Candidate	Votes	%	±%
Labour	Stephanie Peacock	16,399	46.7	+4.9
Reform UK	David White	11,651	33.2	+4.0
Conservative	Suzanne Pearson	3,247	9.3	−13.4
Green	Trevor Mayne	1,521	4.3	+2.2
Liberal Democrats	Simon Clement-Jones	1,172	3.3	−0.2
Yorkshire	Simon Biltcliffe	716	2.0	+1.3
Socialist Labour	Terry Robinson	227	0.6	N/A
English Democrat	Maxine Spencer	149	0.4	N/A
Majority		4,748	13.5	+0.9
Turnout		35,082	46.3	−3.1
Registered electors		75,850		
Labour hold		Swing	+0.5	

=== Elections in the 2010s ===
2019 notional result
Party	Vote	%
Labour	15,684	41.8
Brexit Party	10,964	29.2
Conservative	8,497	22.7
Liberal Democrats	1,311	3.5
Green	773	2.1
Others	279	0.7
Turnout	37,508	49.4
Electorate	75,896	

== See also ==
- List of parliamentary constituencies in South Yorkshire
- List of parliamentary constituencies in the Yorkshire and the Humber (region)
