= Barnsley East =

UK Parliament constituency (1983–1997; 2010–2024)

- Former county constituency for the House of Commons
- 2010–2024 boundary of Barnsley East in South Yorkshire

- Location of South Yorkshire within England.
- County: South Yorkshire
- Electorate: 68,448 (December 2019)
- Major settlements: Wombwell

2010–2024
- Seats: One
- Created from: Barnsley East & Mexborough, Barnsley West & Penistone and Barnsley Central
- Replaced by: Barnsley South and Barnsley North (minor part)

1983–1997
- Seats: One
- Created from: Barnsley and Dearne Valley
- Replaced by: Barnsley East and Mexborough

Barnsley East was a constituency (Note: A borough constituency (for the purposes of election expenses and type of returning officer)) in South Yorkshire, (Note: As with all constituencies, the constituency elects one Member of Parliament (MP) by the first past the post system of election at least every five years.) from 1983 to 1997 and again from 2010 to 2024. As its name suggests, it covered eastern parts of Barnsley, South Yorkshire as well as surrounding areas.

Further to the completion of the 2023 Periodic Review of Westminster constituencies, the seat was replaced (including boundary changes) by Barnsley South, first contested at the 2024 general election.

== Constituency profile ==
The seat covered the south-east suburbs of Barnsley and former coal mining areas such as Hoyland, Darfield and Wombwell. Its residents were poorer than the UK average.

== History ==
The seat was created as Barnsley East in 1983 and later abolished in 1997 to create Barnsley East and Mexborough. It was recreated as Barnsley East at the 2010 general election.

Eight candidates competed for the seat in the 2010 general election; however, the largest two opposition parties failed to gain more than 18.2% each and the winning candidate Michael Dugher managed to obtain 47% of all votes despite the presence of a candidate from the Socialist Labour Party. Although the percentage decline in the Labour vote was the largest in the country (at nearly 24%), they still won the seat safely. In 2017, Stephanie Peacock succeeded Dugher as MP for Barnsley East.

Both between 1983 and 1997, and at the 2010 general election, this constituency had been a safe seat for the Labour Party, as indeed was its temporary replacement, Barnsley East and Mexborough. After the 2019 general election however, this constituency became a marginal seat, with Labour's vote share dropping by 21.9% and their majority cut to just 8.4% after a strong challenge by the Brexit Party.

== Boundaries ==
Map of 2010–2024 boundaries

1983–1997: The Metropolitan Borough of Barnsley wards of Brierley, Cudworth, Darfield, Dearne South, Dearne Thurnscoe, Wombwell North, and Wombwell South.

2010–2024: The Metropolitan Borough of Barnsley wards of Cudworth, Darfield, Hoyland Milton, North East, Rockingham, Stairfoot, Wombwell, and Worsbrough.

Following their review of parliamentary representation in South Yorkshire for the 2010 general election, the Boundary Commission for England divided the existing Barnsley East and Mexborough seat to split off Barnsley East from Mexborough, to create the new Barnsley East constituency.

== Members of Parliament ==
=== MPs 1983–1997 ===
Election	Member	Party
1983	Terry Patchett	Labour
1996 by-election	Jeff Ennis	Labour
1997	Constituency abolished: see Barnsley East and Mexborough & Barnsley Central	

=== MPs 2010–2024 ===
Election	Member	Party
2010	Michael Dugher	Labour
2017	Stephanie Peacock	Labour
2024	constituency abolished	

== Election results 2010–2024 ==
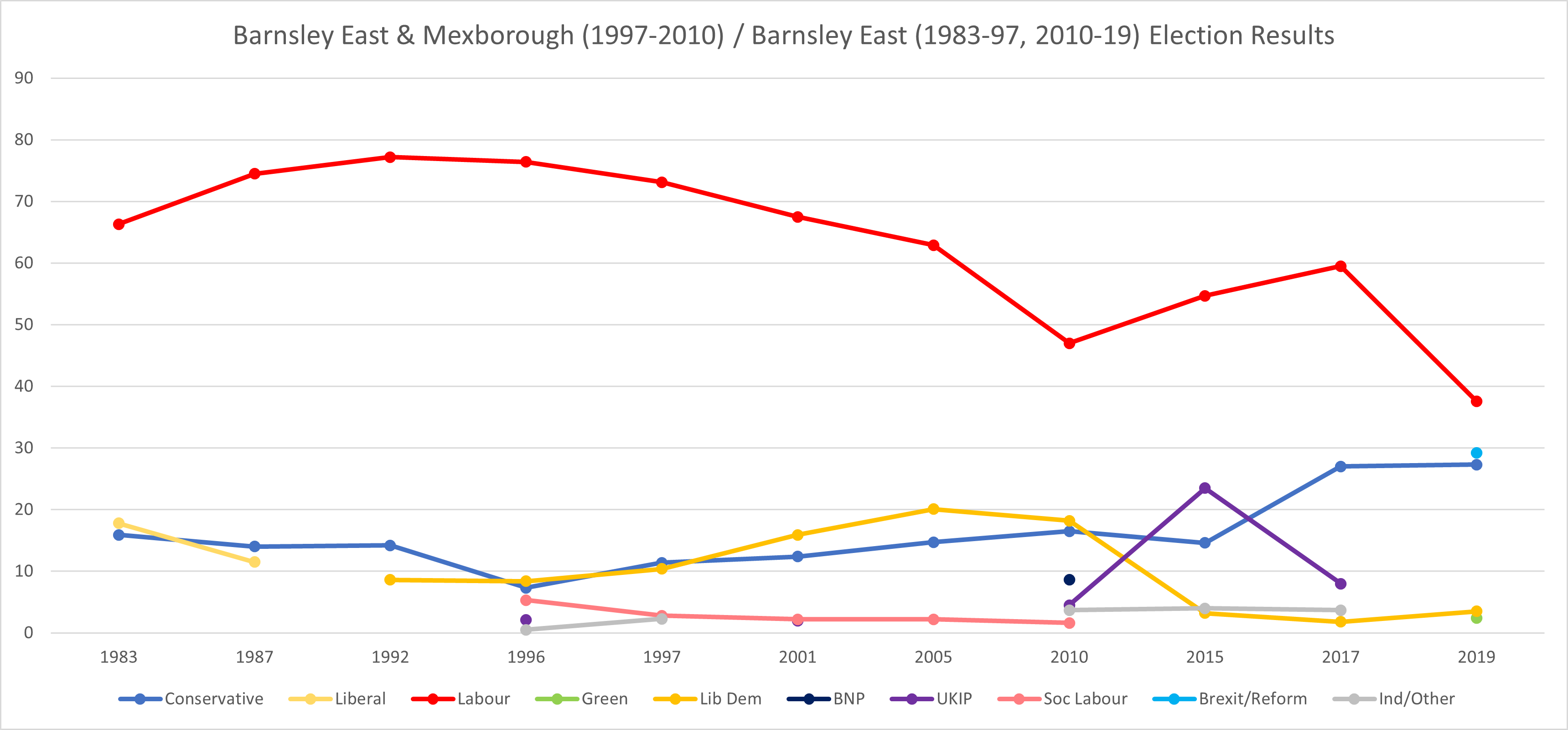
Barnsley East & Mexborough (1997–2010) / Barnsley East (1983–97, 2010–19) Election Results

=== Elections in the 2010s ===
General election 2010: Barnsley East
Party	Candidate	Votes	%	±%
Labour	Michael Dugher	18,059	47.0	−23.9
Liberal Democrats	John Brown	6,969	18.2	+4.1
Conservative	James Hockney	6,329	16.5	+3.8
BNP	Colin Porter	3,301	8.6	New
UKIP	Tony Watson	1,731	4.5	New
Independent	Kevin Hogan	712	1.9	New
Independent	Eddie Devoy	684	1.8	New
Socialist Labour	Ken Capstick	601	1.6	−0.7
Majority		11,090	28.9	
Turnout		38,386	56.1	+7.3
Labour hold		Swing	−14.0	

General election 2015: Barnsley East
Party	Candidate	Votes	%	±%
Labour	Michael Dugher	21,079	54.7	+7.7
UKIP	Robert Swiffen	9,045	23.5	+19.0
Conservative	Katharine Harborne	5,622	14.6	−1.9
Liberal Democrats	Ruth Coleman-Taylor	1,217	3.2	−15.0
Yorkshire First	Tony Devoy	647	1.7	New
English Democrat	Kevin Riddiough	440	1.1	New
TUSC	Ralph Dyson	364	0.9	New
Vapers in Power	Billy Marsden	103	0.3	New
Majority		12,034	31.2	+2.3
Turnout		38,517	55.7	−0.4
Labour hold		Swing	−5.6	

General election 2017: Barnsley East
Party	Candidate	Votes	%	±%
Labour	Stephanie Peacock	24,280	59.5	+4.8
Conservative	Andrew Lloyd	10,997	27.0	+12.4
UKIP	James Dalton	3,247	8.0	−15.5
Yorkshire	Tony Devoy	1,215	3.0	+1.3
Liberal Democrats	Nicola Turner	750	1.8	−1.4
English Democrat	Kevin Riddiough	287	0.7	−0.4
Majority		13,283	32.5	+1.3
Turnout		40,776	58.6	+2.9
Labour hold		Swing	−3.8	

General election 2019: Barnsley East
Party	Candidate	Votes	%	±%
Labour	Stephanie Peacock	14,329	37.6	−21.9
Brexit Party	Jim Ferguson	11,112	29.2	New
Conservative	Adam Gregg	10,377	27.3	+0.3
Liberal Democrats	Sophie Thornton	1,330	3.5	+1.7
Green	Richard Trotman	922	2.4	New
Majority		3,217	8.4	−24.1
Turnout		38,070	54.8	−3.8
Labour hold		Swing		

== Election results 1983–1997 ==
=== Elections in the 1980s ===
General election 1983: Barnsley East
Party	Candidate	Votes	%	±%
Labour	Terry Patchett	23,905	66.3	
Liberal	Peter Tomlinson	6,413	17.8	
Conservative	George England	5,749	15.9	
Majority		17,492	48.5	
Turnout		36,067	67.3	
Labour win (new seat)				

General election 1987: Barnsley East
Party	Candidate	Votes	%	±%
Labour	Terry Patchett	29,948	74.5	+8.2
Conservative	James Clappison	5,437	14.0	−1.9
Liberal	Geoffrey Griffiths	4,482	11.5	−7.3
Majority		23,511	60.5	+12.0
Turnout		39,867	72.6	+5.3
Labour hold		Swing		

=== Elections in the 1990s ===
General election 1992: Barnsley East
Party	Candidate	Votes	%	±%
Labour	Terry Patchett	30,346	77.2	+2.7
Conservative	John M. Procter	5,569	14.2	+0.2
Liberal Democrats	Sylvia Anginotti	3,399	8.6	−2.9
Majority		24,777	63.0	+2.5
Turnout		39,314	72.9	+0.3
Labour hold		Swing	+1.3	

Following the death of Terry Patchett on 11 October 1996, a by-election was held on 12 December 1996. The replacement Labour candidate Jeff Ennis held the seat for the party despite a low voter turnout.

1996 Barnsley East by-election
Party	Candidate	Votes	%	±%
Labour	Jeff Ennis	13,683	76.4	−0.8
Liberal Democrats	David Willis	1,502	8.4	−0.2
Conservative	Jane Ellison	1,299	7.3	−6.9
Socialist Labour	Ken Capstick	949	5.3	New
UKIP	Nikolai Tolstoy	378	2.1	New
Socialist Equality	Julie Hyland	89	0.5	New
Majority		12,181	68.0	+5.0
Turnout		17,900	33.7	−39.2
Labour hold		Swing		

== See also ==
- List of parliamentary constituencies in South Yorkshire

== Sources ==
- BBC Election 2005
- BBC Vote 2001
- Guardian Unlimited Politics (Election results from 1992 to the present)
