= Wentworth and Dearne =

UK Parliament constituency (2010–2024)

- Former county constituency for the House of Commons
- 2010–2024 boundary of Wentworth and Dearne in South Yorkshire

- Location of South Yorkshire within England
- County: South Yorkshire
- Electorate: 73,863 (December 2019)
- Major settlements: Dearne and Rawmarsh

2010–2024
- Seats: One
- Created from: Wentworth; Barnsley East and Mexborough
- Replaced by: Rawmarsh and Conisbrough; Barnsley South (part); Rotherham (minor part)

Wentworth and Dearne was a constituency in South Yorkshire represented in the House of Commons of the UK Parliament since its 2010 creation by John Healey, a member of the Labour Party who served as Shadow Secretary of State for Defence from 2020.

The seat was abolished in the 2023 review of Westminster constituencies. A new constituency, Rawmarsh and Conisbrough, was formed from it with the removal of two Dearne wards, and the addition of the City of Doncaster wards of Conisbrough, and Edlington and Warmsworth. The new constituency was first contested at the 2024 general election.

== History ==
Parliament accepted the Boundary Commission's Fifth Periodic Review of Westminster constituencies recommending the creation of this constituency for the 2010 general election.

Most forerunner parts of the seat of Wentworth (which only existed in its second period from 1983 until 2010) matched its record of being a safe seat for the Labour Party. However, at the 2019 general election, the seat became a marginal between Labour and the Conservative Party. Labour's majority over the Conservatives stood at 2,165 in 2019. Labour's vote share declined by 24.7% at the 2019 election, the second-worst decline in vote share it suffered in any of the 630 constituencies that the party contested at that election (only being surpassed by the 24.9% decline in the Labour vote share in Bassetlaw).

John Healey held a continuous period of frontbench positions, withstanding during this time various rotations of the Labour frontbench – the positions were:

- May 2002 – May 2005 – Economic Secretary to the Treasury
- May 2005 – June 2007 – Financial Secretary to the Treasury
- June 2007 – June 2009 – Minister of State for Local Government
- July 2007 – June 2009 – Minister for Flood Recovery
- June 2009 – May 2010 – Minister of State for Housing
- May 2010 – October 2010 – Shadow Minister of State for Housing
- October 2010 – October 2011 – Shadow Secretary of State for Health

In September 2015 he was appointed Shadow Minister for Housing (attending Shadow Cabinet).

== Boundaries ==
Map of boundaries 2010–2024

The seat comprised satellite settlements to two large Yorkshire towns, separated by green buffers, in a band north of Rotherham and southeast of Barnsley and as such has the electoral wards:

- Metropolitan Borough of Rotherham: Hoober, Rawmarsh, Silverwood, Swinton, Wath and Wickersley
- Metropolitan Borough of Barnsley: Dearne North and Dearne South

Most of the constituency succeeded Wentworth, but the settlement of Dearne was instead the largest in Barnsley East and Mexborough. The name of the seat stems from the village that shares its name with the largest private house in the country and listed gardens in the seat, Wentworth Woodhouse, in a similar manner, with a widened use of an otherwise scarcely populated settlement, as Sefton and Tatton.

== Constituency profile ==
The South Yorkshire settlements grew in the seat into primarily large town size developments from the large presence of coal leading to extensive mining in this area, coupled with convenient proximity to Sheffield, the canals and rivers network, as well as to Doncaster, York, Wakefield and Leeds. As the mining industry has suffered a decline and agriculture employs few people, niche manufacturing, general processing (such as of food and raw materials) as well as retail and distribution are critical sectors of the economy to local employment. Workless claimants who were registered jobseekers were in November 2012 higher than the national average of 3.8%, at 5.6% of the population, based on a statistical compilation by The Guardian.

== Members of Parliament ==
Election	Member	Party
2010	John Healey	Labour
2024	Constituency abolished	

== Election results 2010–2024 ==
=== Elections in the 2010s ===
General election 2010: Wentworth and Dearne
Party	Candidate	Votes	%	±%
Labour	John Healey*	21,316	50.6	−11.2
Conservative	Michelle Donelan	7,396	17.6	+3.8
Liberal Democrats	Nick Love	6,787	16.1	−0.1
UKIP	John Wilkinson	3,418	8.1	+4.6
BNP	William Baldwin	3,189	7.6	+2.9
Majority		13,920	33.0	
Turnout		42,106	58.0	+3.6
Labour hold		Swing	−7.5	

* Served as an MP in the 2005–2010 Parliament

General election 2015: Wentworth and Dearne
Party	Candidate	Votes	%	±%
Labour	John Healey	24,571	56.9	+6.3
UKIP	Mike Hookem	10,733	24.9	+16.7
Conservative	Michael Naughton	6,441	14.9	−2.7
Liberal Democrats	Edwin Simpson	1,135	2.6	−13.5
English Democrat	Alan England	309	0.7	New
Majority		13,838	32.0	−1.0
Turnout		43,189	58.1	+0.1
Labour hold		Swing	−5.2	

General election 2017: Wentworth and Dearne
Party	Candidate	Votes	%	±%
Labour	John Healey	28,547	65.0	+8.1
Conservative	Steven Jackson	13,744	31.3	+16.4
Liberal Democrats	Janice Middleton	1,656	3.8	+1.2
Majority		14,803	33.7	+1.7
Turnout		43,947	58.7	+0.6
Labour hold		Swing	−4.2	

General election 2019: Wentworth and Dearne
Party	Candidate	Votes	%	±%
Labour	John Healey	16,742	40.3	−24.7
Conservative	Emily Barley	14,577	35.1	+3.8
Brexit Party	Stephen Cavell	7,019	16.9	New
Liberal Democrats	Janice Middleton	1,705	4.1	+0.3
Yorkshire	Lucy Brown	1,201	2.9	New
SDP	David Bettney	313	0.8	New
Majority		2,165	5.2	−28.5
Turnout		41,557	55.8	−2.9
Labour hold		Swing	−14.3	

== See also ==
- parliamentary constituencies in South Yorkshire
