= Barnsley North =

UK Parliament constituency (since 2024)

Coordinates: 53.58°N 1.45°W

- County constituency for the House of Commons
- Boundaries since 2024
- Boundary of Barnsley North in Yorkshire and the Humber
- County: South Yorkshire
- Electorate: 76,552 (June 2024)
- Borough: Barnsley
- Major settlements: Barnsley; Cudworth; Royston

Current constituency
- Created: 2024
- Member of Parliament: Dan Jarvis (Labour)
- Seats: One
- Created from: Barnsley Central; Barnsley East

Barnsley North is a constituency of the House of Commons in the UK Parliament. Created as a result of the 2023 Periodic Review of Westminster constituencies, it was first contested at the 2024 general election. It is represented by Dan Jarvis of the Labour Party, who was MP for the predecessor seat of Barnsley Central from 2011 to 2024.

== Constituency profile ==
The constituency is located in South Yorkshire and covers the north-eastern part of the Metropolitan Borough of Barnsley. It contains the central and northern areas of the large market town of Barnsley, as well as villages and rural areas to the north and east. This includes the large villages of Royston, Cudworth and Grimethorpe and the area of connected villages between Kexbrough and Monk Bretton.

The area has a strong industrial heritage in glass and textile production but especially in coal mining; the headquarters of the National Union of Mineworkers is located in the constituency. Residents of the constituency have high levels of deprivation and are less likely to have a degree-level education compared to the rest of the country. White people make up 97% of the population.

At the most recent borough council election in 2024, voters in the constituency elected primarily Labour Party councillors. It is estimated that nearly 70% of voters in Barnsley North supported leaving the European Union in the 2016 referendum, one of the highest rates in the country.

== Boundaries ==
The constituency is composed of the following wards of the Metropolitan Borough of Barnsley (as they existed on 1 December 2020):

- Central, Cudworth, Darton East, Darton West, Monk Bretton, North East, Old Town, Royston, and St Helens

It comprises the whole of the abolished Barnsley Central constituency except Kingstone ward, with the addition of the Cudworth and North East wards from Barnsley East (also abolished).

== Members of Parliament ==
Barnsley Central prior to 2024

Election	Member	Party
2024	Dan Jarvis	Labour

== Elections ==
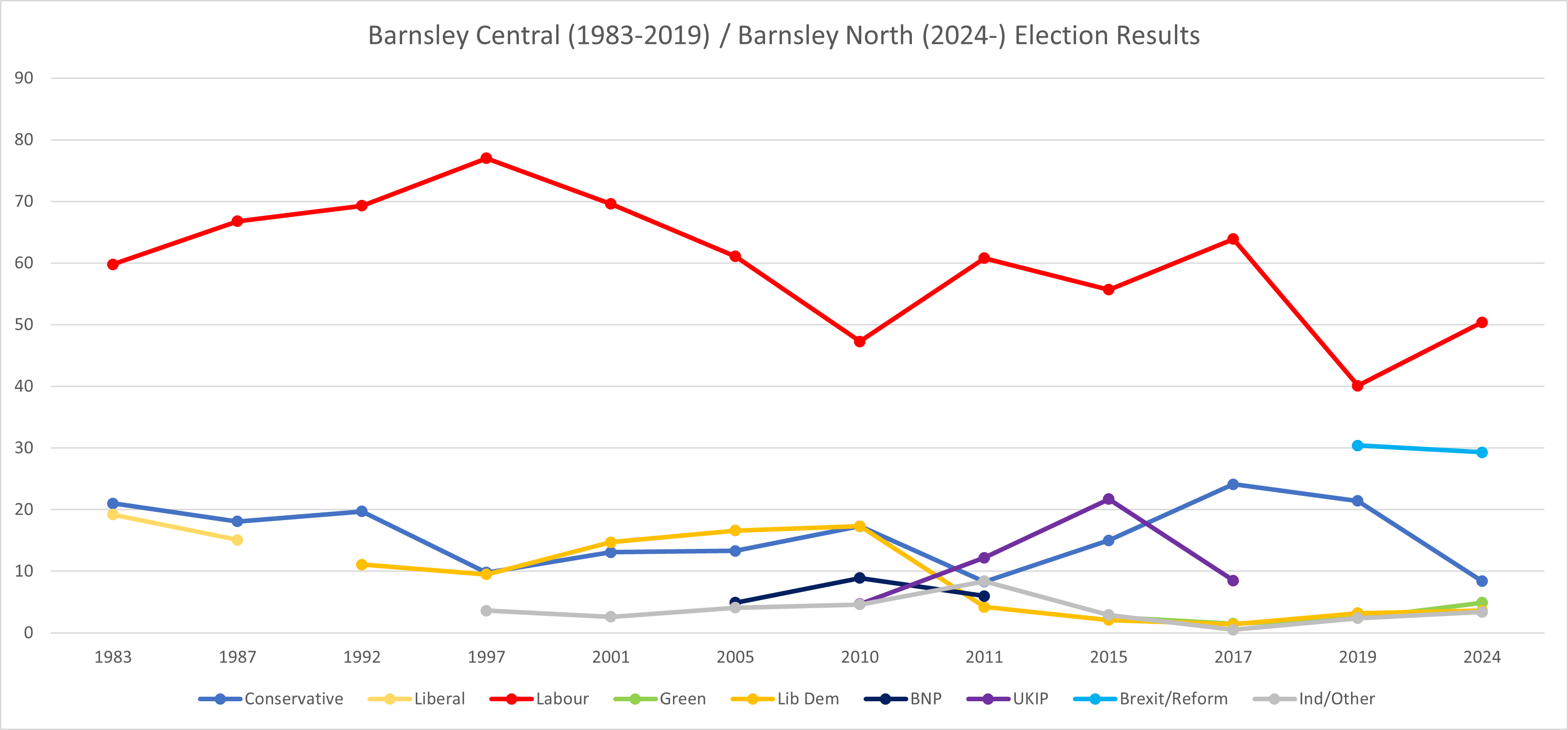
Barnsley Central (1983−2019) / Barnsley North (2024−) Election Results

=== Elections in the 2020s ===
Barnsley North was one of two English constituencies where the Reform UK vote decreased in the election, the other being Hartlepool.

General election 2024: Barnsley North
Party	Candidate	Votes	%	±%
Labour	Dan Jarvis	18,610	50.4	+11.9
Reform	Robert Lomas (Note: After nominations for the 2024 general election closed, Reform UK withdrew support for Lomas on the 29 June, after reports of alleged racist comments.)	10,799	29.3	−0.2
Conservative	Tamas Kovacs	3,083	8.4	−15.6
Green	Tom Heyes	1,805	4.9	+2.5
Liberal Democrats	Penny Baker	1,336	3.6	±0.0
Independent	Neil Fisher	616	1.7	N/A
Yorkshire	Tony Devoy	603	1.6	±0.0
English Democrat	Janus Polenceusz	42	0.1	N/A
Majority		7,811	21.1	+12.1
Turnout		36,894	47.1	−10.8
Registered electors		78,267		
Labour hold		Swing	+6.1	

=== Elections in the 2010s ===
To assess impact of the boundary changes various organisation calculated results of 2019 election if it was conducted under boundaries established by 2023 Periodic review. Below is such assessment from BBC for Barnsley North:

2019 notional result
Party	Vote	%
Labour	17,141	38.5
Brexit Party	13,139	29.5
Conservative	10,663	24.0
Liberal Democrats	1,588	3.6
Green	1,051	2.4
Others	898	2.0
Turnout	44,480	57.9
Electorate	76,794	

For more information see Notional results of the 2019 United Kingdom general election by 2024 constituency.

== See also ==
- List of parliamentary constituencies in South Yorkshire
- List of parliamentary constituencies in the Yorkshire and the Humber (region)
