= Jeffrey Ennis =

British Labour Party politician

Jeffrey Ennis OBE

Member of Parliament for Barnsley East and Mexborough Barnsley East (1996–1997)
- In office 12 December 1996 – 12 April 2010
- Preceded by: Terry Patchett
- Succeeded by: Michael Dugher

Personal details
- Born: 13 November 1952 (age 73) Grimethorpe, West Riding of Yorkshire, England
- Party: Labour
- Spouse: Margaret Angela Knight
- Education: University of the West of England
- Website: www.jeffennismp.com

Jeffrey Ennis (born 13 November 1952) is a British Labour Party politician, who was the Member of Parliament (MP) for Barnsley East and Mexborough from 1996 to 2010, having been first elected at the Barnsley East by-election in 1996.

== Early life and education ==
Ennis was born in Grimethorpe, near Barnsley in the West Riding of Yorkshire, the son of a coal miner and educated at the Hemsworth Grammar School on Station Road before attending the Redland Teachers Training College near Bristol where he was awarded a Bachelor of Education degree in 1975. After leaving education he became a raw materials inspector with J. Lyons and Co. bakery at Carlton, before becoming a teacher in 1976 initially at the Elston Hall Junior School in Fordhouses, Wolverhampton. In 1978, he moved to teach at the Burngreave Middle School in Sheffield, and from 1979 until his election he taught at Hillsborough Primary School in Sheffield.

== Political career ==
Ennis was elected as councillor in the Metropolitan Borough of Barnsley in 1980, becoming the deputy leader in 1988, and was leader 1995–1996, standing down from the council in 1997.

Ennis was elected to the House of Commons at the 1996 Barnsley East by-election following the death of Terry Patchett. Jeff Ennis held the seat at the 12 December 1996 by-election with a majority of 13,181. He made his maiden speech on 14 January 1997. A few months after his election to Westminster he had to go back to his electorate at the 1997 general election for the newly drawn Barnsley East and Mexborough seat, following the redrawing of boundaries and the abolishment of the former Barnsley East. At the election he doubled his majority to 26,763.

Following the 1997 general election, Ennis was appointed the Parliamentary Private Secretary (PPS) to the Minister of State at the Department of Health Tessa Jowell, and then in her capacity of Minister of State at the Department for Education and Employment. He became a member of the Education & Skills Select Committee following the 2001 general election.

In July 2007, he was appointed the PPS to the Minister for the Cabinet Office Ed Miliband.

On 9 February 2010, Ennis announced that he would stand down at the 2010 general election.

Ennis stood as the Labour Party candidate for the North East Ward in the May 2012 Barnsley local council elections.

As of May 2017 Jeff Ennis was Mayor of Barnsley.

== Private life ==
Ennis has been married to Margaret Angela Knight since 1980 and they have three sons, one of whom is called Micheal Ennis. Before his election he was active in the trade union movement and was a branch chairman of the National Association of Schoolmasters Union of Women Teachers (NASUWT) 1979–1996 and has been a member of the Transport and General Workers' Union since 1997. He has lived in his Barnsley constituency for much of his life, and is a supporter of Barnsley F.C.

Parliament of the United Kingdom
Preceded by Terry Patchett	Member of Parliament for Barnsley East; 1996–2010	Succeeded by constituency abolished
