= Michael Dugher =

British politician and executive (born 1975)

Member of Parliament for Barnsley East
- In office 6 May 2010 – 3 May 2017
- Preceded by: Jeff Ennis
- Succeeded by: Stephanie Peacock
Shadow cabinet portfolios
2015–2016	Digital, Culture, Media and Sport
2014–2015	Transport
2013–2014	Cabinet Office
2011–2014	Vice Party Chair
2011–2013	Without Portfolio

Personal details
- Born: Michael Vincent Dugher; 26 April 1975 (age 51) Edlington, South Yorkshire, England
- Party: Labour
- Education: University of Nottingham (BA)

Michael Vincent Dugher (pronounced DUG-ər; born 26 April 1975) is a British former politician who served as Member of Parliament (MP) for Barnsley East from 2010 to 2017. A member of the Labour Party, he was a special adviser to Prime Minister Gordon Brown prior to his election to Parliament.

== Early and personal life ==
Dugher was born and raised in Edlington, South Yorkshire. He attended The McAuley School in Doncaster and received a Bachelor of Arts in Politics from the University of Nottingham. He served as national chairman of Labour Students in 1997.

Dugher is married to Joanna, who he employed as a part-time Parliamentary office manager.

== Career ==
He was the Head of Policy of the Amalgamated Engineering and Electrical Union in 2000 to 2001.

From 2001 to 2002, Dugher was a special adviser to Transport Minister John Spellar at the Department of Transport, Local Government and Regional Affairs. After this, he worked as a special adviser to Geoff Hoon from 2002 to 2008. Hoon was successively the Secretary of State for Defence, the Leader of the House of Commons and the Government Chief Whip.

During 2006–2007, Dugher worked as a corporate lobbyist for American multinational Electronic Data Systems (EDS), one of the government's largest IT contractors.

Dugher worked at 10 Downing Street from 2008 to 2010 as the Chief Political Spokesman for Prime Minister Gordon Brown.

=== Parliamentary career ===
Before his election at the 2010 general election as the MP for Barnsley East, Dugher stood unsuccessfully for Skipton and Ripon, then held by the Conservative David Curry, at the 2001 general election.

Dugher was a Shadow Minister of Defence before becoming the Parliamentary Private Secretary to the Leader of the Opposition. In 2011, he was promoted to Ed Miliband's Shadow Cabinet as Shadow Minister without Portfolio, a role in which he co-ordinated shadow ministers' responses to the government.

In November 2012, Miliband appointed Dugher to the position of Labour Party Vice Chair with responsibility for communications strategy.

In the October 2013 reshuffle, he became Shadow Minister for the Cabinet Office and in November 2014 was appointed Shadow Secretary of State for Transport replacing Mary Creagh. As Shadow Secretary of State for Transport, Dugher told the New Statesman that he wanted to see "more public control of the railways" under a Labour government.

Dugher has been an Executive Committee member of the British-American Parliamentary Group.

In the Labour leadership election of 2015, he was campaign manager for Andy Burnham. He was also a supporter of Tom Watson for the deputy leadership election.

In September 2015, Dugher replaced Chris Bryant as Shadow Secretary of State for Culture, Media and Sport. However, in January 2016, he was sacked from the position in Jeremy Corbyn's first reshuffle, as announced by Dugher himself via Twitter. Dugher did not take telephone calls from Corbyn the previous day. Several shadow cabinet ministers publicly supported Dugher, with Andy Burnham saying that "Michael Dugher is Labour to the core & has served our Party with distinction". Dugher said that Corbyn did not like an article he had written for the New Statesman, saying "I took a decision to speak out and I paid a price for it". Dugher described his article "I said despite all the stuff you've read in the newspapers: I don't think Jeremy Corbyn is a man motivated by revenge, I didn't think he'll do these mass sackings as an act of revenge over Syria that we've read about every day, every week, for several weeks. I was defending Jeremy and I was defending the 'new politics'".

He did not stand in the 2017 general election, stating, "It's time now for me to make a difference in life outside of politics. It's also time that I do what is best for my wife and children, whom I love with all my heart."

=== Post-Parliamentary career ===
In April 2017, Dugher was announced as UK Music's new chief executive, replacing outgoing chief executive Jo Dipple. He took up the role in May 2017. In February 2020, he became Chief Executive of the Betting and Gaming Council (BGC).

== Political views ==
Dugher has held the post of Vice-Chair of Labour Friends of Israel (LFI). He has criticised the Boycott, Divestment and Sanctions (BDS) campaign, saying "Boycotting Israeli institutions is ignorant, wrong and counterproductive to peace. We should be building bridges and furthering dialogue".

He gave a keynote speech at the 'We Believe in Israel' conference, where he said "Each time I visit Israel, my admiration for that great country grows".

Following the 2015 general election, Dugher said Labour mishandled its relationship with the Jewish community through a combination of neglect and incompetence. He criticised Labour's response to the 2014 Gaza conflict and called the then Labour leader Ed Miliband's decision to whip Labour MPs to vote for a motion recognising the State of Palestine as "catastrophic". Dugher abstained in the parliament vote on this matter, despite a three line whip and being a shadow cabinet minister.

=== Controversies ===
Dugher repeatedly branded Zarb-Cousin, a safer gambling campaigner '#RouletteBoy' in an argument on Twitter in 2017. Dugher, who is the Chief Executive of the UK's Betting and Gaming Council, a lobbying group campaigning for the gambling industry, asked "I thought you liked casinos, young Matt?" He later deleted the tweet, and apologised for his comments and claimed he was not mocking Zarb-Cousin's addiction.

The exchange was later reported by The Daily Telegraph and The Guardian, adding that Dugher had attacked a first of its kind, peer-reviewed study into gambling behaviour published by the academic journal Nature Human Behaviour, calling it 'condescending'. The Betting and Gaming Council 'refused to comment' on Dugher's tweets.

In August 2023, Dugher was criticised for his comments about the suicide of a gambling addict.

Parliament of the United Kingdom
New constituency	Member of Parliament for Barnsley East; 2010–2017	Succeeded by Stephanie Peacock
Political offices
Preceded by Jon Trickett	Shadow Minister without Portfolio; 2011–2013	Succeeded by Jon Trickett
Preceded by Jon Trickett	Shadow Minister for the Cabinet Office; 2013–2014	Succeeded by Lucy Powell
Preceded by Mary Creagh	Shadow Secretary of State for Transport; 2014–2015	Succeeded by Lilian Greenwood
Preceded by Chris Bryant	Shadow Secretary of State for Culture, Media and Sport; 2015–2016	Succeeded by Maria Eagle
Party political offices
Preceded by Stephen Timms	Vice Chair of the Labour Party; 2011–2014	Succeeded by Jon Trickett
