= Rawmarsh and Conisbrough =

UK Parliament constituency (since 2024)

Coordinates: 53.48°N 1.31°W

- County constituency for the House of Commons
- Boundaries since 2024
- Boundary of Rawmarsh and Conisbrough in Yorkshire and the Humber
- County: South Yorkshire
- Major settlements: Rawmarsh, Conisbrough, Swinton, Wath upon Dearne

Current constituency
- Created: 2024
- Member of Parliament: John Healey (Labour)
- Seats: One
- Created from: Wentworth and Dearne; Don Valley (part)

Rawmarsh and Conisbrough is a constituency in South Yorkshire represented in the House of Commons of the Parliament of the United Kingdom. It is currently represented by John Healey of the Labour Party, the current Chancellor of the Exchequer. Healey was previously MP for the predecessor seats of Wentworth (1997–2010) and Wentworth and Dearne (2010–2024).

The constituency was created in the 2023 Periodic Review of Westminster constituencies, and first contested at the 2024 general election.

== Constituency profile ==
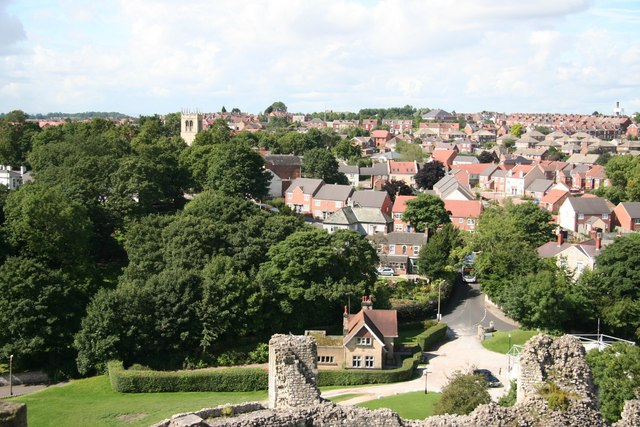
Conisbrough viewed from Conisbrough Castle

Rawmarsh and Conisbrough is a constituency in South Yorkshire in England, covering parts of the Doncaster and Rotherham metropolitan boroughs. Its largest settlement is the village of Rawmarsh, which has a population of around 19,000. Other settlements include the towns of Conisbrough, Swinton, Edlington and Wath upon Dearne and the villages of Warmsworth, Denaby Main, Brampton Bierlow and Bramley.

This is a former industrial area; most of the constituency's towns and villages have a history of coal mining and steelmaking. Swinton is known for its production of pottery and Conisbrough is a historic town with a 12th-century castle. Like much of industrial Northern England, the decline of the coal industry in the late 20th century left this area with high rates of unemployment. Today, most of the constituency has high levels of deprivation, although Bramley and the rural villages are wealthier. Most residents live in semi-detached or terraced housing and house prices are generally lower than the rest of Yorkshire; the average price is less than half the overall UK average.

The age profile of Rawmarsh and Conisbrough residents is in line with the rest of the UK. Residents have low levels of income, average rates of homeownership, and the child poverty rate is high. They have low levels of education and a high proportion work in the retail, manufacturing and construction sectors. The percentage claiming unemployment benefits is similar to the UK-wide rate. White people made up 97% of the population at the 2021 census.

The parts of the constituency within the Rotherham borough (Rawmarsh, Swinton and Wath upon Dearne) are represented entirely by Labour Party councillors at the local council level. The areas within Doncaster borough (Conisbrough and Edlington), which held elections more recently, elected Reform UK representatives. Voters in Rawmarsh and Conisbrough strongly supported leaving the European Union in the 2016 referendum; an estimated 69% voted in favour of Brexit compared to the UK-wide rate of 52%.

== Boundaries ==
The constituency comprises the following (as they existed on 1 December 2020):

- The City of Doncaster wards of: Conisbrough; Edlington & Warmsworth.
- The Metropolitan Borough of Rotherham wards of: Bramley & Ravenfield; Hoober; Kilnhurst & Swinton East; Rawmarsh East; Rawmarsh West; Swinton Rockingham; Wath.

It comprises:

- The bulk of those parts of the abolished constituency of Wentworth and Dearne in the Borough of Rotherham, including Rawmarsh, Swinton, Wath upon Dearne, West Melton and Brampton Bierlow
- The communities of Conisbrough, Edlington and Warmsworth, from the abolished Don Valley constituency.

== Members of Parliament ==
Wentworth & Dearne prior to 2024

Election	Member	Party
2024	John Healey	Labour

== Elections ==
=== Elections in the 2020s ===
General election 2024: Rawmarsh and Conisbrough
Party	Candidate	Votes	%	±%
Labour	John Healey	16,612	49.0	+8.9
Reform	Adam Wood	9,704	28.6	+12.5
Conservative	Oliver Harvey	4,496	13.3	−23.7
Green	Tom Hill	1,687	5.0	+4.5
Liberal Democrats	Paul Horton	1,137	3.4	−0.3
Workers Party	Robert Watson	268	0.8	N/A
Majority		6,908	20.4	+17.3
Turnout		33,904	49.0	–8.7
Registered electors		69,132		
Labour hold		Swing	−1.8	

=== Elections in the 2010s ===
2019 notional result
Party	Vote	%
Labour	16,249	40.1
Conservative	14,992	37.0
Brexit Party	6,535	16.1
Liberal Democrats	1,500	3.7
Others	1,074	2.7
Green	194	0.5
Turnout	40,544	57.7
Electorate	70,272	

== See also ==
- List of parliamentary constituencies in South Yorkshire
- List of parliamentary constituencies in the Yorkshire and the Humber (region)

== Notes ==
Parliament of the United Kingdom
Preceded by Leeds West and Pudsey	Constituency represented by the chancellor of the Exchequer; 2026–present	Incumbent
