= Bridlington and The Wolds =

UK Parliament constituency (since 2024)

Coordinates: 54.02°N 0.46°W

- County constituency for the House of Commons
- Boundaries since 2024
- Boundary of Bridlington and The Wolds in Yorkshire and the Humber
- County: East Riding of Yorkshire
- Electorate: 72,681 (2024)
- Major settlements: Bridlington; Driffield; Hornsea; Market Weighton

Current constituency
- Created: 2024
- Member of Parliament: Charlie Dewhirst (Conservative)
- Seats: One
- Created from: East Yorkshire; Beverley and Holderness (part)

Bridlington and The Wolds is a constituency of the House of Commons in the UK Parliament. Created as a result of the 2023 Periodic Review of Westminster constituencies, it was first contested at the 2024 general election, when it was won by Charlie Dewhirst of the Conservative Party.

== Constituency profile ==
The constituency of Bridlington and The Wolds covers a large rural area of the East Riding of Yorkshire and includes most of the Yorkshire Wolds. The largest settlement is the coastal town of Bridlington with a population of around 38,000. Other towns in the constituency are Driffield, Hornsea and Market Weighton. Most of the constituency is agricultural, but the coastal area contains a number of holiday parks and Bridlington and Hornsea are popular seaside resorts.

Compared to national averages, residents are considerably older, more religious and have low levels of income, education and professional employment. Parts of Bridlington fall within the 10% most deprived areas in England, although the inland area around Driffield is wealthier. White people make up 98% of the population. At the local council, most of the constituency is represented by Conservative or independent councillors, although Bridlington saw strong support for the regionalist Yorkshire Party and the Liberal Democrats. Voters strongly supported leaving the European Union in the 2016 referendum with an estimated 66% voting in favour of Brexit.

== Boundaries ==
The constituency is composed of the following (as they existed on 1 December 2020):

- The District of East Riding of Yorkshire wards of: Bridlington Central and Old Town; Bridlington North; Bridlington South; Driffield and Rural; East Wolds and Coastal; North Holderness; Wolds Weighton (majority).

It comprises the following:

- A majority of the abolished East Yorkshire constituency – excluding the Pocklington Provincial ward and a small part of the Wolds Weighton ward
- The North Holderness ward from the retained Beverley and Holderness constituency

== Members of Parliament ==
East Yorkshire prior to 2024

Election	Member	Party
2024	Charlie Dewhirst	Conservative

== Elections ==
=== Elections in the 2020s ===
General election 2024: Bridlington and The Wolds
Party	Candidate	Votes	%	±%
Conservative	Charlie Dewhirst	14,846	34.6	−32.0
Labour	Sarah Carter	11,721	27.3	+7.4
Reform UK	Maria Bowtell	10,350	24.1	N/A
Liberal Democrats	Jayne Phoenix	3,097	7.2	−0.3
Green	Gill Leek	1,595	3.7	+0.9
Yorkshire	Tim Norman	915	2.1	−1.1
Independent	Tom Cone	309	0.7	N/A
SDP	Carlo Verda	104	0.2	N/A
Majority		3,125	7.3	−39.4
Turnout		42,937	58.9	−5.2
Registered electors		72,931		
Conservative hold		Swing	−19.7	

=== Elections in the 2010s ===
2019 notional result
Party	Vote	%
Conservative	30,916	66.6
Labour	9,231	19.9
Liberal Democrats	3,479	7.5
Green	1,323	2.8
Others	1,491	3.2
Turnout	46,440	64.1
Electorate	72,501	

== See also ==
- List of parliamentary constituencies in Humberside
- Parliamentary constituencies in Yorkshire and the Humber
