= Terry Patchett =

British politician (1940–1996)

Terry Patchett MP

Member of Parliament for Barnsley East
- In office 9 June 1983 – 11 October 1996
- Preceded by: constituency established
- Succeeded by: Jeff Ennis

Personal details
- Born: 11 July 1940 Darfield, South Yorkshire, British Empire
- Died: 11 October 1996 (aged 56)
- Party: Labour
- Spouse: Glenys Veal

Terry Patchett (11 July 1940 – 11 October 1996) was a politician in the United Kingdom.

Patchett served as Member of Parliament for Barnsley East from 1983 until his death, and was a member of the Labour Party.

== Early life ==
Patchett was born in Darfield, South Yorkshire on 11 July 1940. He studied politics and economics at the University of Sheffield.

== Career ==
Before becoming an MP, Patchett worked as a miner for seventeen years. A member of the National Union of Mineworkers (NUM), he became the branch delegate for Houghton Main in 1966, and from 1977 he was a member of the union's Yorkshire executive. From 1969 to 1973 he was also on Wombwell District Council. Though he wanted to be the miners' agent for Barnsley, in 1982 Arthur Scargill instead offered him the candidacy for the safe Labour seat of Dearne Valley, whose incumbent MP, Edwin Wainwright, was retiring. After boundary changes, he won the redrawn seat of Barnsley East in 1983 with a majority of 17,500 votes.

=== Member of Parliament ===
Patchett felt out of place in the House of Commons and rarely spoke in the chamber. However, he was on the Select Committee on Social Services and served as vice-chairman of the Parliamentary Labour Party's energy committee.

Defending the interests of mining communities, he opposed the Petroleum Royalties (Relief) Act 1983, which exempted oil companies from royalties on new fields, denouncing it as an attempt to weaken the NUM. He also opposed the closure of rich collieries such as Barnburgh and plans to increase imports of foreign coal. He was strongly loyal to Scargill and politically was on the left wing of the Labour Party.

Patchett's last appearance in Parliament was the vote on the Scott Report on 26 February 1996. Suffering from cancer, he risked his life to go to vote, against his doctor's advice and family's wishes, because of the opportunity of defeating the government. He made the 400-mile (600 km) journey from Darfield to Westminster by ambulance.

== Personal life and death ==
In 1961 Patchett married Glenys Veal, with whom he had three children.

He died of cancer on 11 October 1996 and the subsequent by-election was won by Jeff Ennis.

Parliament of the United Kingdom
New constituency	Member of Parliament for Barnsley East; 1983–1996	Succeeded by Jeff Ennis
