= Stephanie Peacock =

British politician (born 1986)

Stephanie Peacock MP
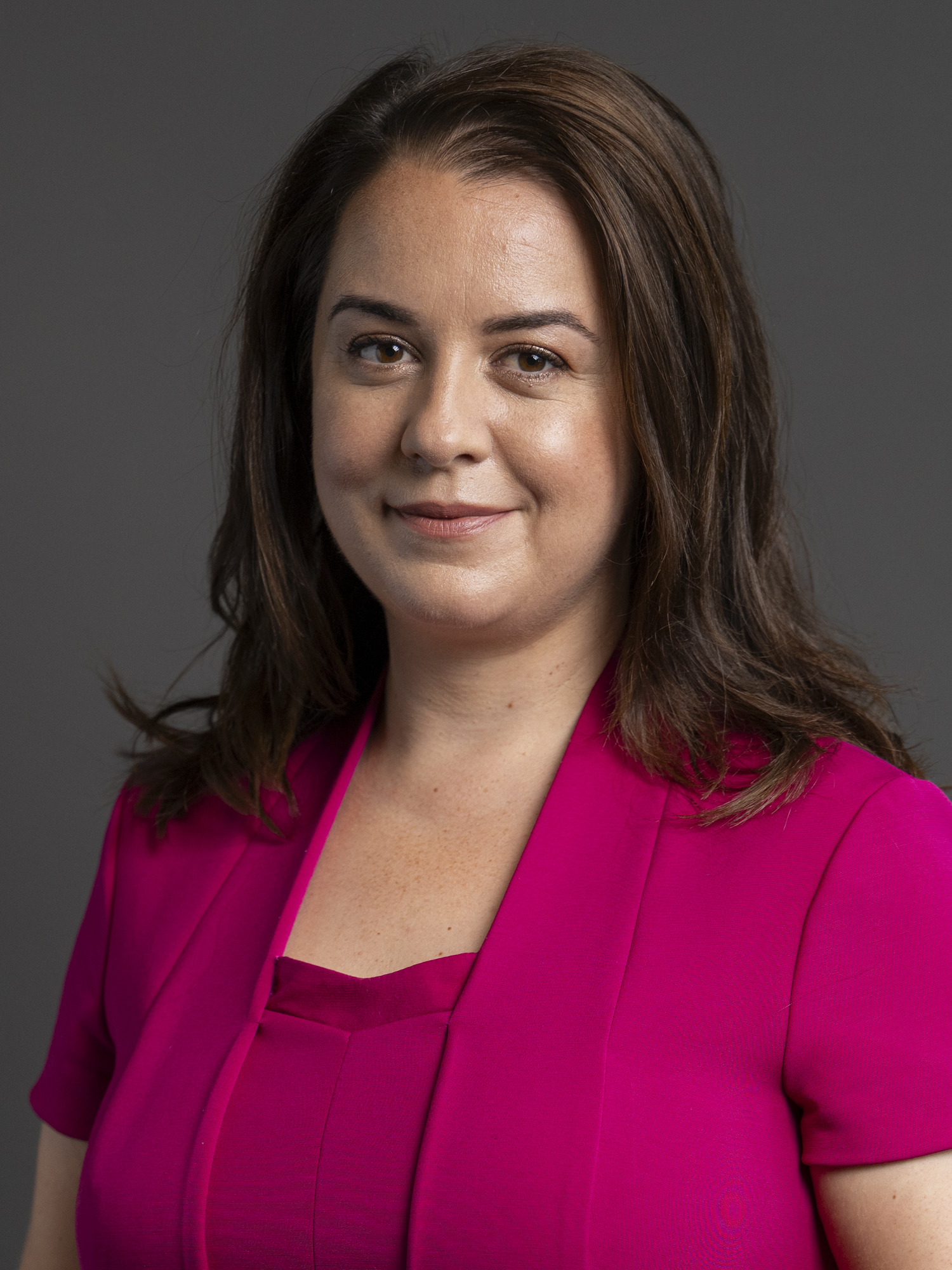
- Official portrait, 2024

Parliamentary Under-Secretary of State for Sport, Tourism, Place and Digital Government (Note: Parliamentary Under-Secretary of State for Sport, Media, Civil Society and Youth until September 2025, Parliamentary Under-Secretary of State for Sport, Tourism, Civil Society and Youth September 2025–July 2026)
- Incumbent
- Assumed office 9 July 2024
- Prime Minister: Keir Starmer; Andy Burnham
- Preceded by: Stuart Andrew (Sport and Civil Society); Julia Lopez (Media)

Member of Parliament for Barnsley South Barnsley East (2017–2024)
- Incumbent
- Assumed office 8 June 2017
- Preceded by: Michael Dugher
- Majority: 4,748 (13.5%)
Shadow portfolios
2023–2024	Sport, Gambling and Media
2022–2023	Media, Data and Digital Infrastructure
2021–2022	Veterans
2020–2021	Flooding, Coastal Communities and Water
2020–2020	Cabinet Office
2018–2019	Whip

Personal details
- Born: Stephanie Louise Peacock; 1986 (age 39–40) Birmingham, England
- Party: Labour
- Education: Queen Mary University of London (BA); University College London (MA)
- Website: www.stephaniepeacock.org.uk

Stephanie Louise Peacock (born 1986) is a British Labour Party politician who has been Member of Parliament (MP) for Barnsley South, previously Barnsley East, since 2017. She has served as Parliamentary Under-Secretary of State for Sport, Media, Civil Society and Youth since July 2024.

== Early life and education ==
Stephanie Peacock was born in 1986 in Birmingham. She obtained a degree in history from Queen Mary University of London, and a master's degree from the Institute of Education, University College London.

== Early career ==
After graduating Peacock worked as a teacher, before going on to work on adult education in Yorkshire for the shop workers' union USDAW.

Between 2007 and 2011, she served as the Youth Representative on the Labour Party National Executive Committee. In 2007 she introduced Gordon Brown at the launch of his unopposed campaign to become Labour Leader.

Between 2013 and 2017, she worked as a Political Officer for the GMB trade union.

== Parliamentary career ==
At the 2015 general election, Peacock stood as the Labour Party candidate in Halesowen and Rowley Regis, coming second with 36.2% of the vote behind the incumbent Conservative MP James Morris.

=== 1st term (2017–2019) ===
Peacock was elected to Parliament as MP for Barnsley East at the snap 2017 general election with 59.5% of the vote and a majority of 13,283.

From January 2018 until March 2019 she served as an Opposition Whip. She resigned on 14 March 2019 after defying the whip to vote against an amendment calling for a second Brexit referendum.

In November 2018, Peacock, alongside fellow Women's Parliamentary Football teammates, Alison McGovern, Tracey Crouch, Louise Haigh and Hannah Bardell, was rebuked by the then Speaker of the House of Commons, John Bercow, for having a 'kickabout' in the House of Commons chamber after Parliamentary business.

=== 2nd term (2019–2024) ===
At the 2019 general election, Peacock was re-elected as MP for Barnsley East with a decreased vote share of 37.6% and a decreased majority of 3,217.

In January 2020 Peacock joined Labour's Shadow Cabinet Office team as the Shadow Minister responsible for the Veterans' Office and Procurement. Following the election of Keir Starmer as the Leader of the Labour Party (UK), she was appointed as the Shadow Minister for Fisheries, Water and Flooding as part of Labour's Shadow Department for Environment, Food and Rural Affairs team.

Peacock endorsed Lisa Nandy in the 2020 Labour Party leadership election.

In February 2020, Peacock campaigned to change the maximum sentences for causing death by dangerous driving from fourteen years to life, as well as reforming the Mineworkers' Pension Scheme to get more money for retired miners.

On 14 May 2021, Peacock was appointed as the Shadow Minister for Veterans following a reshuffle.

=== 3rd term (2024–) ===
Due to the 2023 Periodic Review of Westminster constituencies, Peacock's constituency of Barnsley East was abolished, and replaced with Barnsley South. At the 2024 general election, Peacock was elected to Parliament as MP for Barnsley South with 46.7% of the vote and a majority of 4,748.

== Personal life ==
In 2013 it was reported that Peacock was in a relationship with Tom Watson, then Deputy Chair of the National Executive Committee.

It was reported in February 2025 that Peacock was in a relationship with Jonathan Ashworth, the then CEO of Labour Together.

== Notes ==
Parliament of the United Kingdom
Preceded by Michael Dugher	Member of Parliament for Barnsley East; 2017–2024	Constituency abolished
New constituency	Member of Parliament for Barnsley South; 2024–present	Incumbent
