= Barnsley Central =

UK Parliament constituency (1983–2024)

- Former borough constituency for the House of Commons
- 2010–2024 boundary of Barnsley Central in South Yorkshire

- Location of South Yorkshire within England
- County: South Yorkshire
- Population: 85,714 (2011 census)
- Electorate: 64,229 (December 2019)
- Borough: Barnsley
- Major settlements: Barnsley, Royston

1983–2024
- Seats: One
- Created from: Barnsley; Wakefield
- Replaced by: Barnsley North; Barnsley South (part)

Barnsley Central was a constituency in South Yorkshire represented in the House of Commons from 1983 until 2024. It covered parts of the town of Barnsley.

In the 2023 Periodic Review of Westminster constituencies, the seat was replaced (including moderate boundary changes) by Barnsley North, which was first contested at the 2024 general election.

== Constituency profile ==
Barnsley Central was generally an urban seat and had a large majority of its population on middle or low incomes, with most of the large former mining town's social housing contained within it. It was held by the Labour Party since 1983 and was consistently a safe seat, like its main predecessor, until 2019, when Labour's majority was cut to 9.7%.

== History ==
Created in 1983, Barnsley Central covered a similar area to that of the former Barnsley constituency. The seat was held for almost a year from May 2010 by Eric Illsley as an independent MP after he was suspended from the Labour Party over the expenses row and he led to its becoming vacant on 8 February 2011.

On 12 January 2011, having admitted the crime of fraud over his expenses, Illsley announced the intention to stand down from Parliament, necessitating a by-election in early 2011. On 8 February 2011 Ilsley resigned his seat (Note: By the time-honoured tradition of accepting appointment as Steward of the Chiltern Hundreds) before he was due to be sentenced for fraudulently claiming parliamentary expenses. The by-election was held on 3 March 2011 and was won by Dan Jarvis for the Labour Party. The Labour majority and share of the vote rose to give an absolute majority, on a turnout 20% lower than in the General Election; meanwhile the Conservative share of the vote fell steeply to just 8.3%, less than UKIP's 12.2% vote-share. In the 2019 general election, Jarvis held onto his seat, but with a sharply reduced majority; it fell from 15,546 to 3,571. The Brexit Party came second with 11,233 votes, which was 30.4% of the vote, compared to Jarvis's 40.1%.

== Boundaries ==
Map of 2010–2024 boundaries

1983–1997: The Borough of Barnsley wards of Ardsley, Athersley, Central, Monk Bretton, North West, Royston, and South West.

1997–2010: The Borough of Barnsley wards of Ardsley, Athersley, Central, Cudworth, Monk Bretton, North West, Royston, and South West.

2010–2024: The Borough of Barnsley wards of Central, Darton East, Darton West, Kingstone, Monk Bretton, Old Town, Royston, and St Helens.

Barnsley Central constituency covered most of the town of Barnsley. It was bordered by the constituencies of Wakefield, Hemsworth, Barnsley East, and Penistone and Stocksbridge.

== Members of Parliament ==
The constituency had three Members of Parliament since its creation in 1983, all of whom were from the Labour Party.

Election	Member	Party
1983	Roy Mason	Labour
1987	Eric Illsley	Labour
2010	Eric Illsley	Independent
2011 by-election	Dan Jarvis	Labour
2024	constituency abolished	

== Election results 1983–2024 ==
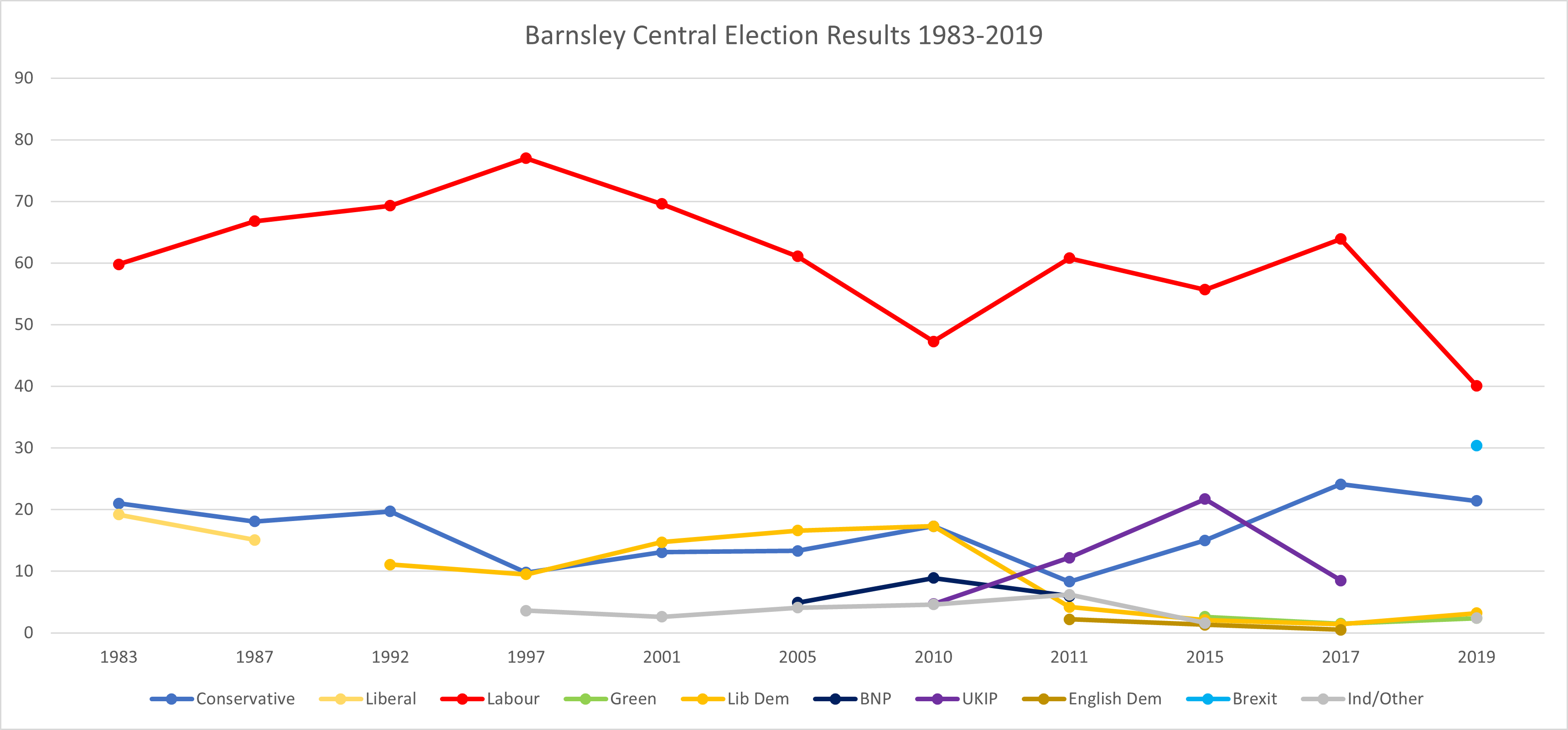

=== Elections in the 1980s ===
General election 1983: Barnsley Central
Party	Candidate	Votes	%	±%
Labour	Roy Mason	21,847	59.8	
Conservative	Howard S. Oldfield	7,674	21.0	
Liberal	Geoffrey Reid	7,011	19.2	
Majority		14,173	38.8	
Turnout		36,532	66.3	
Labour win (new seat)				

General election 1987: Barnsley Central
Party	Candidate	Votes	%	±%
Labour	Eric Illsley	26,139	66.8	+7.0
Conservative	Vivien Prais	7,088	18.1	−2.9
Liberal	Susan Holland	5,928	15.1	−4.0
Majority		19,051	48.7	+9.9
Turnout		37,548	70.0	+3.7
Labour hold		Swing		

=== Elections in the 1990s ===
General election 1992: Barnsley Central
Party	Candidate	Votes	%	±%
Labour	Eric Illsley	27,048	69.3	+2.5
Conservative	David N. Senior	7,687	19.7	+1.6
Liberal Democrats	Stephen R. Cowton	4,321	11.1	−4.1
Majority		19,361	49.6	+0.9
Turnout		39,056	70.5	+0.5
Labour hold		Swing	+0.5	

General election 1997: Barnsley Central
Party	Candidate	Votes	%	±%
Labour	Eric Illsley	28,090	77.0	+6.2
Conservative	Simon Gutteridge	3,589	9.8	−8.7
Liberal Democrats	Darren Finlay	3,481	9.5	−1.2
Referendum	James Walsh	1,325	3.6	New
Majority		24,501	67.2	+17.6
Turnout		36,485	59.7	−10.8
Labour hold		Swing	+7.5	

=== Elections in the 2000s ===
General election 2001: Barnsley Central
Party	Candidate	Votes	%	±%
Labour	Eric Illsley	19,181	69.6	−7.4
Liberal Democrats	Alan Hartley	4,051	14.7	+5.2
Conservative	Ian McCord	3,608	13.1	+4.0
Socialist Alliance	Henry Rajch	703	2.6	New
Majority		15,130	54.9	−12.7
Turnout		27,543	45.8	−13.9
Labour hold		Swing	−6.3	

General election 2005: Barnsley Central
Party	Candidate	Votes	%	±%
Labour	Eric Illsley	17,478	61.1	−8.5
Liberal Democrats	Miles Crompton	4,746	16.6	+1.9
Conservative	Peter Morel	3,813	13.3	+0.2
BNP	Geoffrey Broadley	1,403	4.9	New
Independent	Donald Wood	1,175	4.1	New
Majority		12,732	44.5	−10.4
Turnout		28,615	47.2	+1.4
Labour hold		Swing	−5.2	

=== Elections in the 2010s ===
General election 2010: Barnsley Central
Party	Candidate	Votes	%	±%
Labour	Eric Illsley	17,487	47.3	−10.4
Liberal Democrats	Christopher Wiggin	6,394	17.3	+0.7
Conservative	Piers Tempest	6,388	17.3	+4.0
BNP	Ian Sutton	3,307	8.9	+4.4
UKIP	David Silver	1,727	4.7	New
Independent	Donald Wood	732	2.0	−2.1
Independent	Tony Devoy	610	1.6	New
Socialist Labour	Terrence Robinson	356	1.0	New
Majority		11,093	30.0	−14.5
Turnout		37,001	56.5	+8.8
Labour hold		Swing		

2011 Barnsley Central by-election
Party	Candidate	Votes	%	±%
Labour	Dan Jarvis	14,724	60.8	+13.5
UKIP	Jane Collins	2,953	12.2	+7.5
Conservative	James Hockney	1,999	8.3	−9.0
BNP	Enis Dalton	1,463	6.0	−2.9
Independent	Tony Devoy	1,266	5.2	+3.6
Liberal Democrats	Dominic Carman	1,012	4.2	−13.1
English Democrat	Kevin Riddiough	544	2.2	New
Monster Raving Loony	Howling Laud Hope	198	0.8	New
Independent	Michael Val Davies	60	0.2	New
Majority		11,771	48.6	+18.6
Turnout		24,219	36.5	−20.0
Labour hold		Swing		

General election 2015: Barnsley Central
Party	Candidate	Votes	%	±%
Labour	Dan Jarvis	20,376	55.7	+8.4
UKIP	Lee Hunter	7,941	21.7	+17.1
Conservative	Kay Carter	5,485	15.0	−2.3
Green	Michael Short	938	2.6	New
Liberal Democrats	John Ridgway	770	2.1	−15.2
TUSC	Dave Gibson	573	1.6	New
English Democrat	Ian Sutton	477	1.3	New
Majority		12,435	34.0	+4.0
Turnout		36,560	56.7	+0.2
Labour hold		Swing	−4.3	

General election 2017: Barnsley Central
Party	Candidate	Votes	%	±%
Labour	Dan Jarvis	24,982	63.9	+8.2
Conservative	Amanda Ford	9,436	24.1	+9.1
UKIP	Gavin Felton	3,339	8.5	−13.2
Green	Richard Trotman	572	1.5	−1.1
Liberal Democrats	David Ridgway	549	1.4	−0.7
English Democrat	Stephen Morris	211	0.5	−0.8
Majority		15,546	39.8	+5.8
Turnout		39,089	60.6	+3.9
Labour hold		Swing	−0.48	

General election 2019: Barnsley Central
Party	Candidate	Votes	%	±%
Labour	Dan Jarvis	14,804	40.1	−23.8
Brexit Party	Victoria Felton	11,233	30.4	New
Conservative	Iftikhar Ahmed	7,892	21.4	−2.7
Liberal Democrats	Will Sapwell	1,176	3.2	+1.8
Green	Tom Heyes	900	2.4	+0.9
Yorkshire	Ryan Williams	710	1.9	New
Independent	Donald Wood	188	0.5	New
Majority		3,571	9.7	−30.1
Turnout		36,903	56.5	−4.1
Labour hold		Swing	−27.1	

This was the highest Brexit Party vote share at the 2019 general election. It was also the highest vote share for any non Labour candidate in the seat's history.

== See also ==
- List of parliamentary constituencies in South Yorkshire

== Sources ==
- Guardian Unlimited Politics (Election results from 1992 to the present)
