= Birdwell, South Yorkshire =

Village in South Yorkshire, England

Coordinates: 53.50°N 1.4833°W

Birdwell
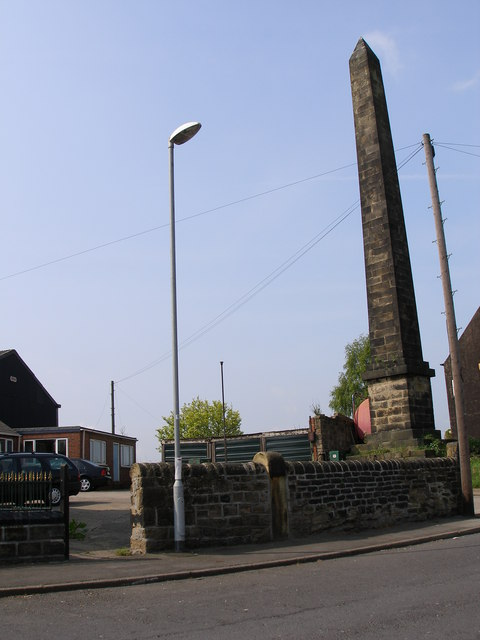
- The Birdwell Obelisk, built in 1775

- Location within South Yorkshire
- Metropolitan borough: Barnsley
- Metropolitan county: South Yorkshire
- Region: Yorkshire and the Humber
- Country: England
- Sovereign state: United Kingdom
- Post town: Barnsley
- Postcode district: S70
- Dialling code: 01226
- Police: South Yorkshire
- Fire: South Yorkshire
- Ambulance: Yorkshire
- UK Parliament: Barnsley South

Birdwell is a village in the Metropolitan Borough of Barnsley in South Yorkshire, England and is located approximately 3.5 miles (6 km) south of Barnsley, 10.5 miles (17 km) north-east of Sheffield. Birdwell currently falls within the Rockingham Ward of the Barnsley Metropolitan Council, although plans to add most of Birdwell to the Worsbrough Ward were proposed again in 2024.

Neighbouring areas of Birdwell include Worsbrough Village, Tankersley and Hoyland Common.

The A61 (Sheffield Road) passes north–south through the length of Birdwell, and at the southern end is Birdwell Roundabout which is the junction between the M1 motorway at Junction 36 and the A61. The roundabout also marks the start of the Dearne Valley Parkway, a relatively new dual carriageway which links the M1 at Junction 36 to the A1 at Marr (near Doncaster).

== History ==
Although Birdwell was a hamlet in the Worsbrough district, the origins of Birdwell date back to the time of the English Civil War, around 1642, when the name of the small settlement is thought to be first mentioned.

Birdwell is part of the Parish of Worsbrough St Mary's. The 11th century church is situated less than ½ mile away in nearby Worsbrough Village.

Birdwell was until 1974 part of the Worsbrough Urban District, in the West Riding of Yorkshire.

In the years following the Second World War, open cast mining took place on much of the land to the northern end of Birdwell, and in some areas the remains of the quarries can still be found. Much of the land was subsequently restored to agriculture, mainly pasture with a little low key arable production and since the 1970s was owned by a local farming company. A small pocket of woodland called Parkinson Spring survived the mining activity and whilst little is known of its history, the name 'spring' could infer it was coppiced for the production of spring wood. The predominantly ancient woodlands of Miller Hill and Wigfield Wood are thought to be remnants of the once extensive woodland of the Wortley Park estate, an area through which the M1 motorway was subsequently built.

Hangmanstone Depot was the site of Allan Finlay's diesel engine export company Hartwood Exports, where a great number of UK buses and other commercial vehicles ended their lives.

Birdwell & Hoyland Common railway station, was a railway station on the South Yorkshire Railway's Blackburn Valley Line betwixt Westwood and Dovecliffe railway stations. Although named after nearby Hoyland Common and Birdwell, the station was built in Tankersley. The station was intended to serve Birdwell, Pilley and Hoyland Common, although the original chosen site was moved half a mile nearer towards Barnsley to serve the purposes of the Earl of Wharncliffe who was, at that time, sinking Wharncliffe Silkstone Colliery in nearby Tankersley. The station was opened in February 1855, the building having an ornate canopy over its entrance and containing a private waiting room for use by the Earl of Wharncliffe. The station was closed on 7 December 1953.

Nearby coal mines including Barrow Colliery and Rockingham Colliery.

== Landmarks ==
- Worsbrough Mill Museum and Country Park
- The Obelisk. Towards the southern end of Birdwell stands a large obelisk which was constructed in 1775 (according to the plaque) to mark the distance (3 miles) to Wentworth Castle (at nearby Stainborough) built by William Wentworth, 2nd Earl of Strafford (1722–1791). The obelisk was struck by lightning on 6 June 1906.
- St Mary's Church, Worsbrough Village.

== Education ==
Birdwell has its own primary school(formerly Worsbrough Birdwell Primary) and private day-nursery called Chatterbox. Worsbrough St. Mary's Primary closed in 2007, it was situated on the northern edge of Birdwell, near to Worsbrough Village.

== Sport ==
Two football teams from the village have played in the FA Cup: Birdwell F.C. and Birdwell Primitive Methodists F.C.

Birdwell played in 11 FA Cup competitions between 1907 and 1928 whereas Birdwell Primitive Methodists played in just the one FA Cup competition, losing their one and only FA Cup game. The game on 11 September 1909 was against Atlas and Norfolk Works. The Sheffield side had originally been drawn at home but the game was played at Birdwell. The 'Primitives', as they were often known, took the lead and were level with the visitors at half-time but the latter proved too strong and ran out 4-1 winners, Nuttall scoring all four goals.

== Notable people ==
- Nick Crowe artist was born in Birdwell in 1968
- Keith Matthewman was born here in 1936
- Andrew Raynes world strongman competitor
- The Wednesday and England footballer, Harry Ruddlesdin was born in Birdwell in 1876
- Charlie Williams (OBE) lived in Birdwell until his death, in September 2006
- Sylvia Young (founder and principal of the famous Sylvia Young Theatre School in London) lived in Birdwell as a child evacuee from the capital during the Second World War

== See also ==
- Listed buildings in Rockingham
