= Worsbrough =

Area in South Yorkshire, England

Coordinates: 53.52°N 1.47°W

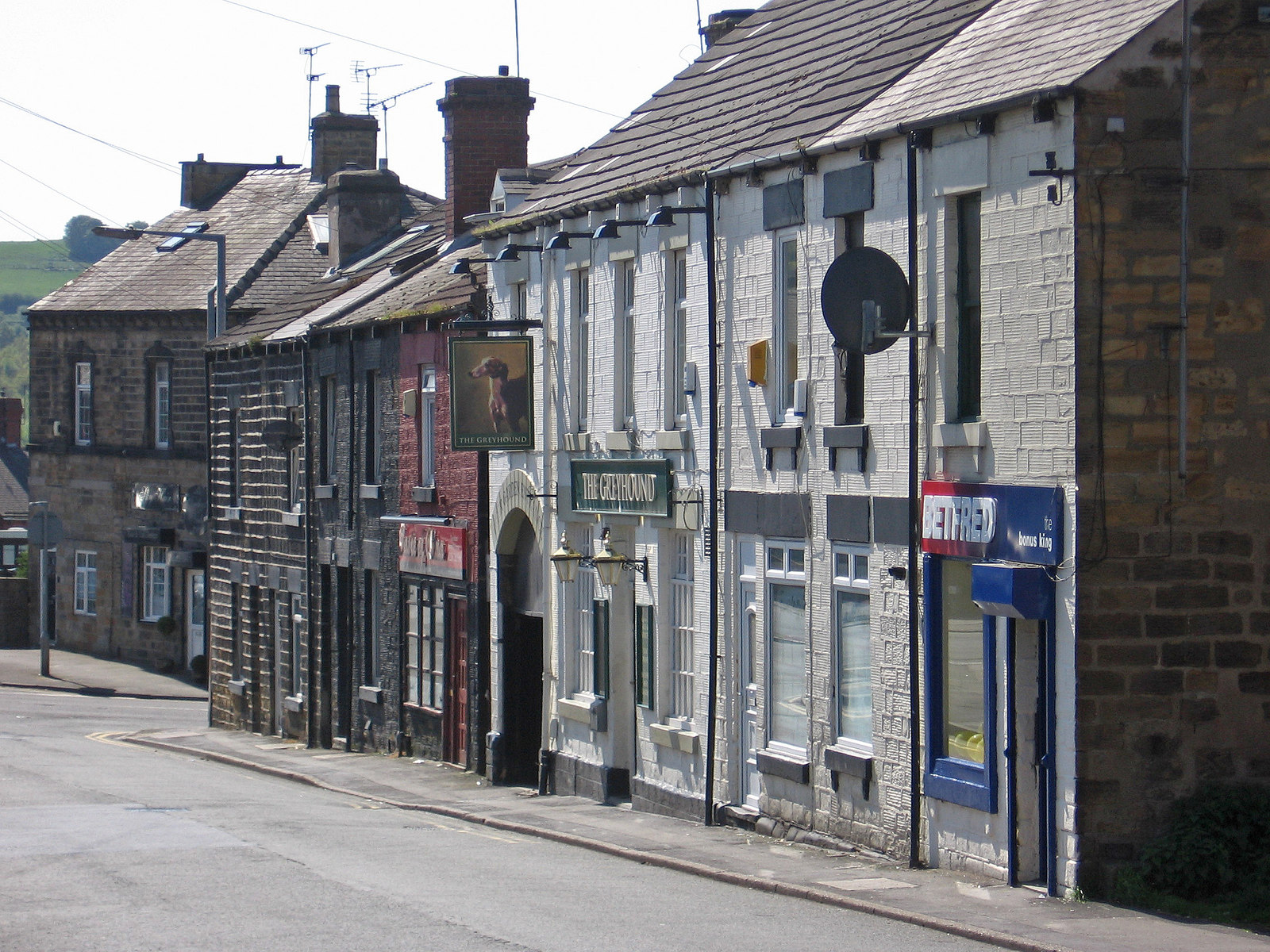
- Worsbrough Dale – southern end of High Street

- Location within South Yorkshire
- Population: 13,700
- OS grid reference: SE3406
- Metropolitan borough: Barnsley
- Metropolitan county: South Yorkshire
- Region: Yorkshire and the Humber
- Country: England
- Sovereign state: United Kingdom
- Post town: BARNSLEY
- Postcode district: S70
- Dialling code: 01226
- Police: South Yorkshire
- Fire: South Yorkshire
- Ambulance: Yorkshire
- UK Parliament: Barnsley South

Worsbrough is a district and civil parish in the metropolitan borough of Barnsley, South Yorkshire, England. Until 1974 Worsbrough had its own urban district council in the West Riding of Yorkshire. Much of Worsbrough is now part of Barnsley Metropolitan Borough Council's, Worsbrough Ward, although certain parts of the historic Worsbrough district, such as Birdwell, Rockley and Blacker Hill, currently lie within neighbouring council wards.

== Geography ==
The Worsbrough district included three parishes; St James's originally included the suburbs of Worsbrough Bridge and Ward Green. St Thomas's included Worsbrough Dale, Swaithe and Bank End. St Mary's included Worsbrough Village, Birdwell, Blacker Hill, Worsbrough Park and Rockley.

Worsbrough Common estate is a suburb of the Barnsley town centre area. It takes its name from the old common above Highstone Lane. Although it takes its name from the old Worsbrough common, most of the modern Worsbro Common council estate was never part of the Worsbrough Urban District or Parish, but part of the County Borough of Barnsley. Furthermore, approximately one third of the common ground and fields used to build the Kendray council estate was on land within the Worsbrough Urban District, which was later swallowed up by the County Borough of Barnsley after the estate was constructed.

Stainborough C.P. was formerly a sub division of the Worsbrough Urban District.

The River Dove flows through Worsbrough and the reservoir before joining the River Dearne . The A61 traverses this large valley, before passing through Birdwell and junction 36 of the M1, in the direction of Sheffield.

A railway line, the Worsbrough Branch line, linked to the former Woodhead Line, passed along the valley. It is now part of the Trans-Pennine Trail.

The Worsbrough Branch railway line was primarily a coal freight line and started at Aldham from Wath and ended at West Silkstone Junction, where it joined the Barnsley-Penistone line.

The Worsbrough Bank, sometimes referred to as the Worsbrough Incline, was a steep bank on the Worsbrough Branch of the Great Central Railway (GCR) freight-only line from Wath to Penistone, climbing for 7 miles (11 km), with a stretch of 3 miles (4.8 km) at a nominal gradient of 1 in 40 (2.5%). Sections of this incline also suffered from colliery subsidence, making it infamously difficult to restart a stalled train on these severe sections. The main traffic on the line was loaded trains carrying coal from the southern Yorkshire coalfields to Lancashire via the Woodhead Tunnel.

The LNER Class U1 was designed solely for the Worsbrough Branch line, prior to electrification in the early 1950s.

The Worsbrough Branch line was closed in 1981.

There were two passenger railway stations in the Worsbrough U.D. both in rather remote locations at the district's southern edge. One being at Dovecliffe, and a short lived station High Royds(1854–56) at Shortwood, both on the South Yorkshire Railway's Barnsley to Sheffield line. Dovecliffe railway station was originally named Smithley for Darley Main & Worsborough. The road from Worsbrough Dale to Dovecliffe is called Station Road. Dovecliffe railway station closed in 1953, but freight traffic on the line operated for Rockingham Colliery until the late 1960s and the nearby Barrow Colliery, until the mid 1980s. The line was closed in 1986.

The current Hallam Line and Penistone Line between Barnsley-Sheffield, both run through the Worsbrough area at Swaithe.

=== Landmarks ===
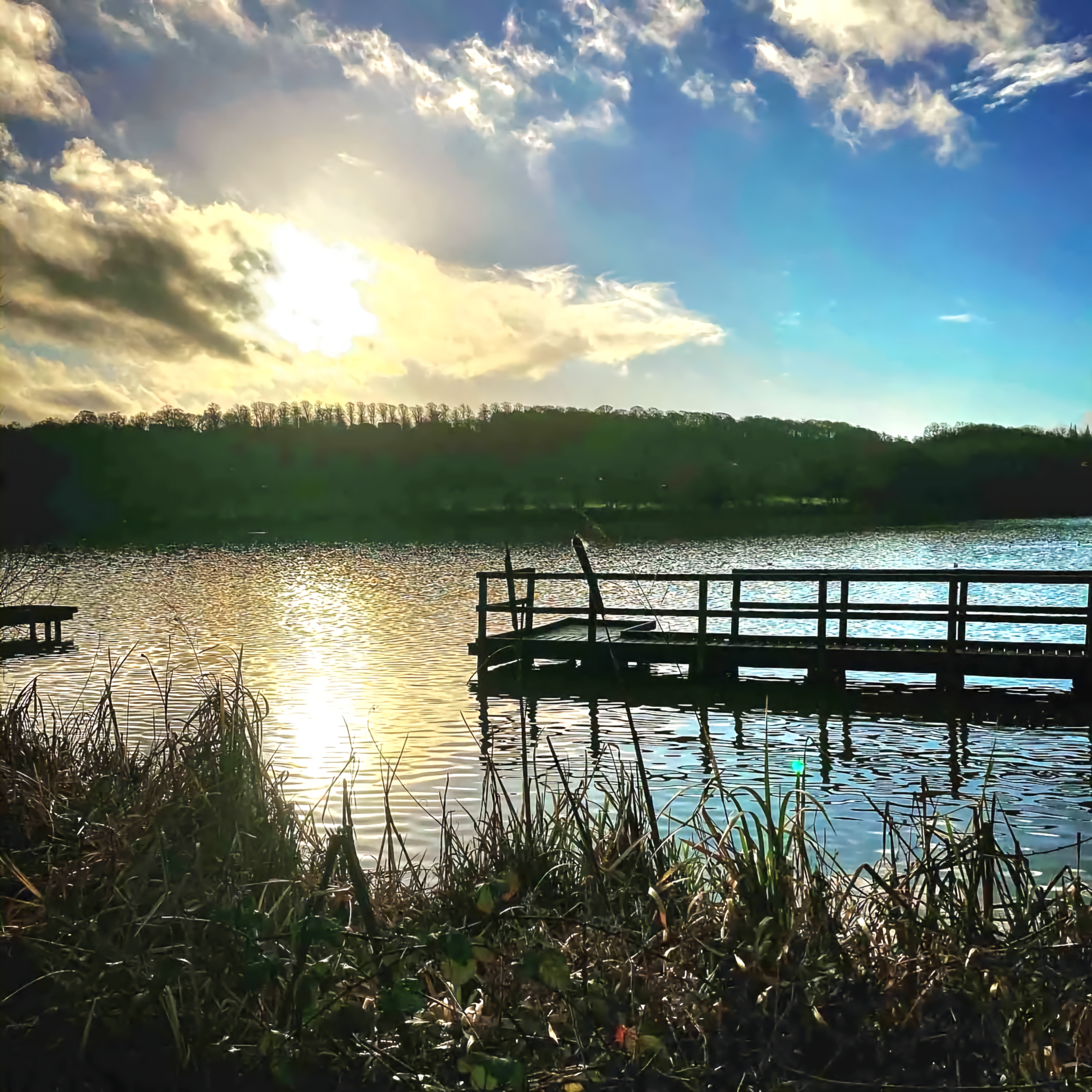
Worsbrough Country Park and Worsbrough Reservoir

Notable landmarks of Worsbrough include Houndhill, Rockley Old Hall, Rockley Furnace, Wigfield Farm, Worsbrough Hall, St Mary's Church, Swaithe Hall also Worsbrough Mill and Worsbrough Reservoir, which are within Worsbrough Country Park. There is also remnants of a canal, the Worsbrough canal basin, which was known as the Worsbrough branch of the Dearne and Dove Canal.

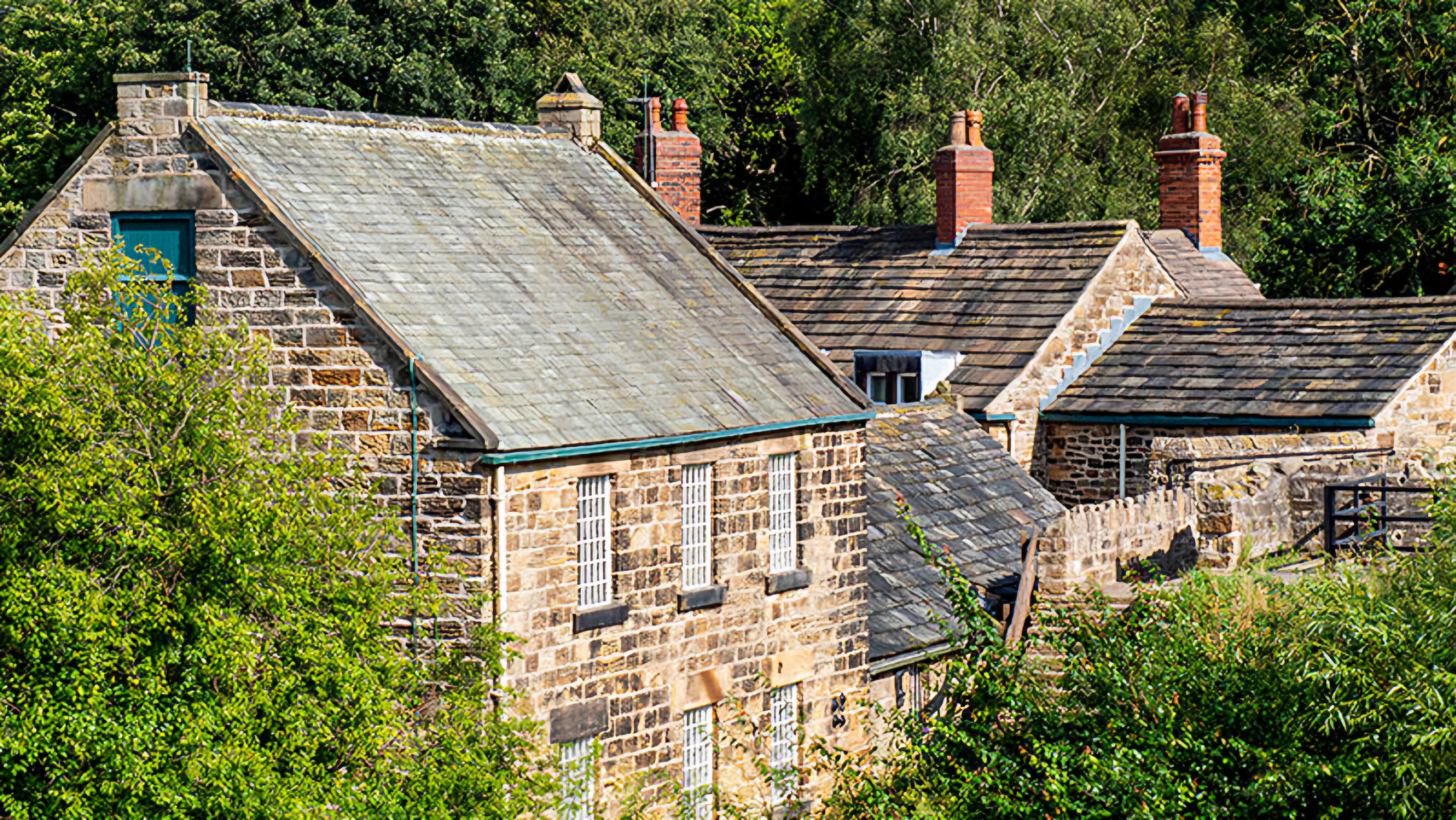
Worsbrough Mill

== History ==
Worsbrough dates back to at least the 7th century from the time of the Kingdom of Northumbria. Worsbrough was listed as being within the Wapentake of Staincross, Yorkshire, in the Domesday Book:

In Wircesburg Gerneber and Haldene had five carucates of land and a half to be taxed where there may be four ploughs. Gamel and Chetelber now have it of Ilbert, themselves two ploughs, and four bordars, and one mill pays two shillings. Wood pasture half a mile long and half a mile broad. Value in King Edward's time four pounds, now thirty shillings.

The name 'Worsbrough' means 'Weorc's fortified place'.

The historic centre of Worsbrough was what is now known as Worsbrough Village. It was colloquially referred to as Wusber/Wusper up until recent times, and is spelt as such on old maps.

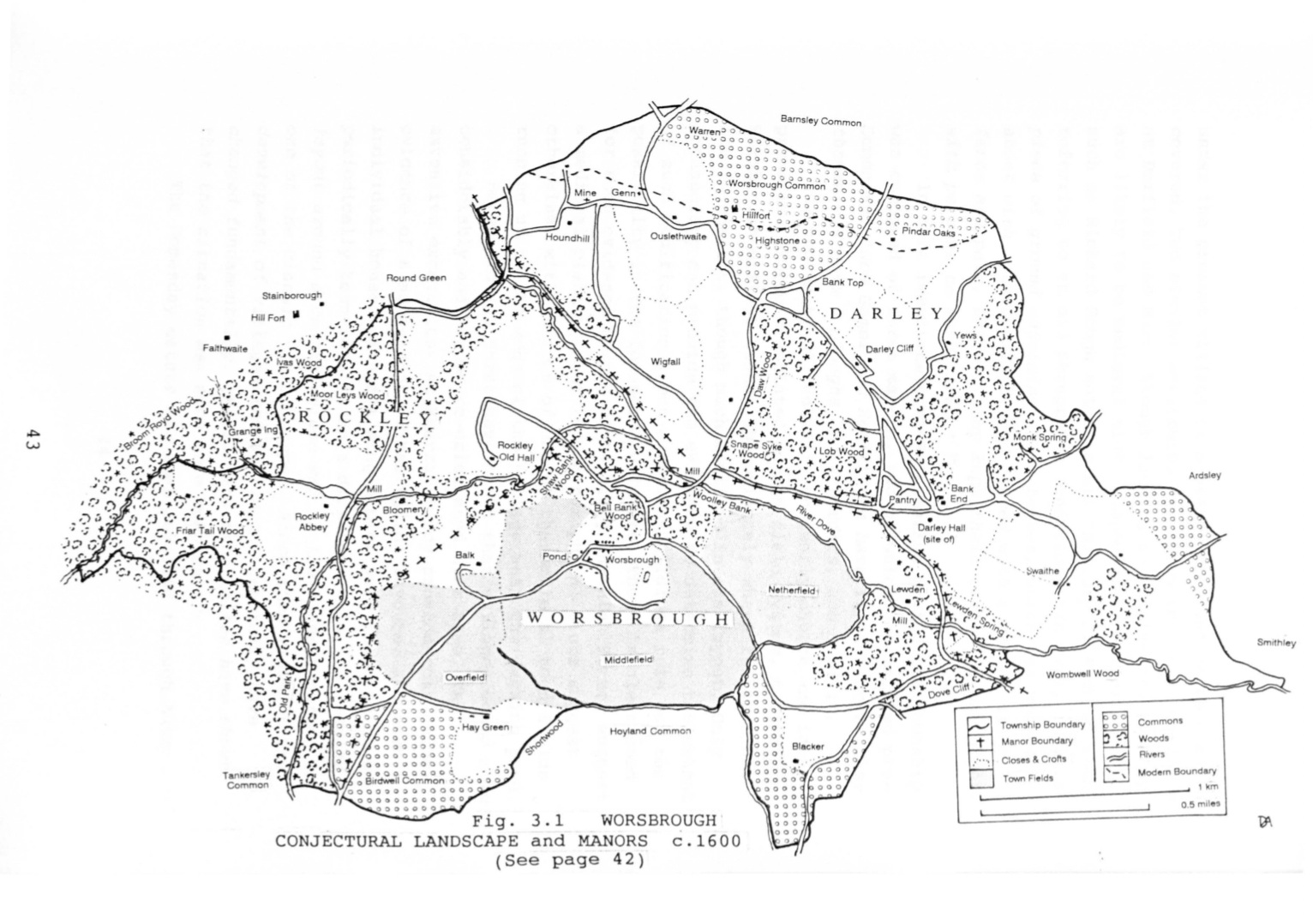
Worsbrough, Yorkshire 1600s map

Worsbrough was a largely farming and agricultural settlement prior to the Industrial Revolution. During the Industrial Revolution, there was a growing coal mining industry, plus iron foundries and several quarries across the Worsbrough District.

The railway, canal system and better road links between Barnsley and Sheffield, also led to increased industry and migration to Worsbrough from other parts of the North, Britain and Ireland, and to the wider area as a whole.

Several coal mines in the industrial era were located in Worsbrough, more so in the east of the area, such as Swaithe Main, Martin's Main, Worsbrough Park, Bell Ing, Blacker Main, Kendal Green, Rob Royd, Barrow, Mount Vernon, Edmunds Main, Darley Main.

With the rise of industry in the area and migration, came risks and due to unsafe and treacherous working conditions, many men and boys lost their lives, and families their breadwinners.

Several large pit disasters rocked the local community.

In 1849, 75 men and boys lost their lives in the Darley Main Colliery disaster in Worsbrough Dale.

In 1862, another massive pit disaster occurred this time at Edmunds Main Colliery. Fifty-nine men and boys died in the explosions.

Then, in 1875 at Swaithe Main Colliery, another explosion that led to the deaths of 143 men and boys, this was the biggest loss of life since the Oaks Disaster near Hoyle Mill, Barnsley.

There was several 'lesser' pit disasters in the Worsbrough area, including the 1907 Barrow Colliery disaster, among others.

Today there are several memorials to those who lost their lives in local pit disasters, at churchyards in the area.

Settlements historically within the Worsbrough District are Worsbrough Village, Worsbrough Park, Rockley, Round Green, Smithley, Dovecliffe, Blacker Hill, Hay Green, Shortwood, Birdwell, Hound Hill, Rob Royd, Lewden, Swaithe, Goose Hulls, Darley, White Cross, Worsbrough Dale, Bank End, Worsbrough Bridge, Ward Green, Kendal Green, Pindar Oaks.

== Places of worship ==
St Thomas & St James' Church

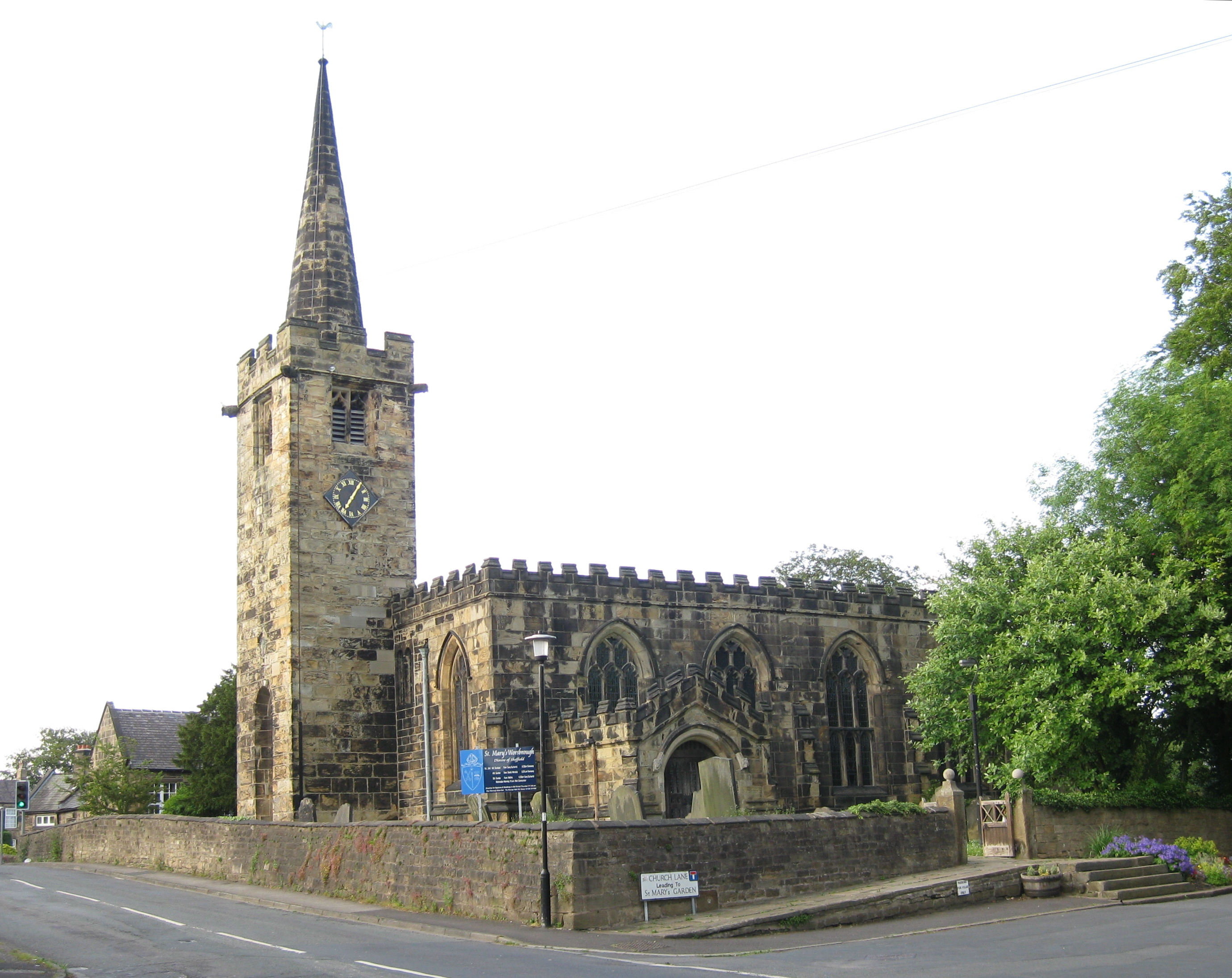
St Mary's Church

=== Church of England ===
The Worsbrough Dale (St Thomas) parish covers the majority of the population of Worsbrough north of the river including Swaithe. It stretches up Hunningley Lane (B6100) as far as Birk Avenue.

Worsbrough Village (St Mary) church, south of the river near Worsbrough Hall and the parish covers most of the area of Worsbrough south of the river and includes Birdwell and most of the M1 between the river and junction 36.

==== St Thomas and St James' Church ====
On Bank End Road in Worsbrough Dale. The church was built in 1858 and consecrated in 1859. The Wentworth family of Wentworth Castle gave a donation of £2,000 and other people provided donations of smaller amounts or helped in other ways. The total cost of the church building was about £3,000. Listed as Grade II by Historic England. The church was originally called St Thomas's, but after St James's church in Worsbrough Bridge became a RC church, St Thomas took on St James's name and Parish. St Thomas's was the parish church of Worsbrough Dale, Swaithe and Bank End, until the addition of St James's Parish.

==== St Mary's Church ====
St Mary's Church built over a thousand years ago, is a Grade I listed building in the tranquil setting of the historic settlement of Worsbrough Village. The Parish of St Mary's covers, Worsbrough Village, Birdwell, Blacker Hill, and the rural areas of Worsbrough Park and Rockley.

=== Roman Catholic ===
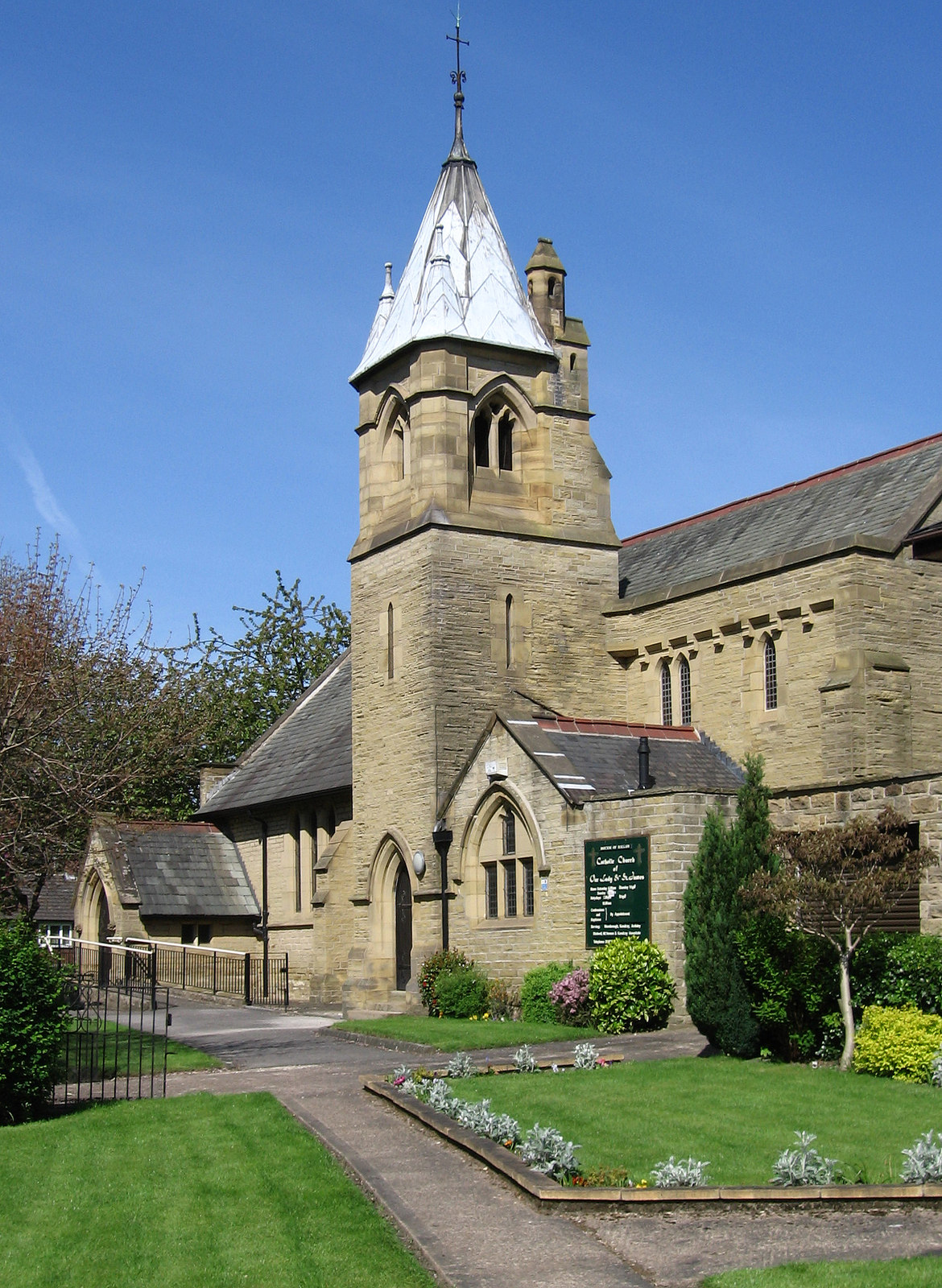
Our Lady & St James' RC Church

On West Street (B6100) in Worsbrough Bridge. Our Lady and St James Church. Built 1902 by T. H. and F. Healey of Bradford. Listed as Grade II by Historic England. The church was formerly a Church of England church known as St.James'. The Parish covered Worsbrough Bridge and Ward Green.

=== Community Church ===
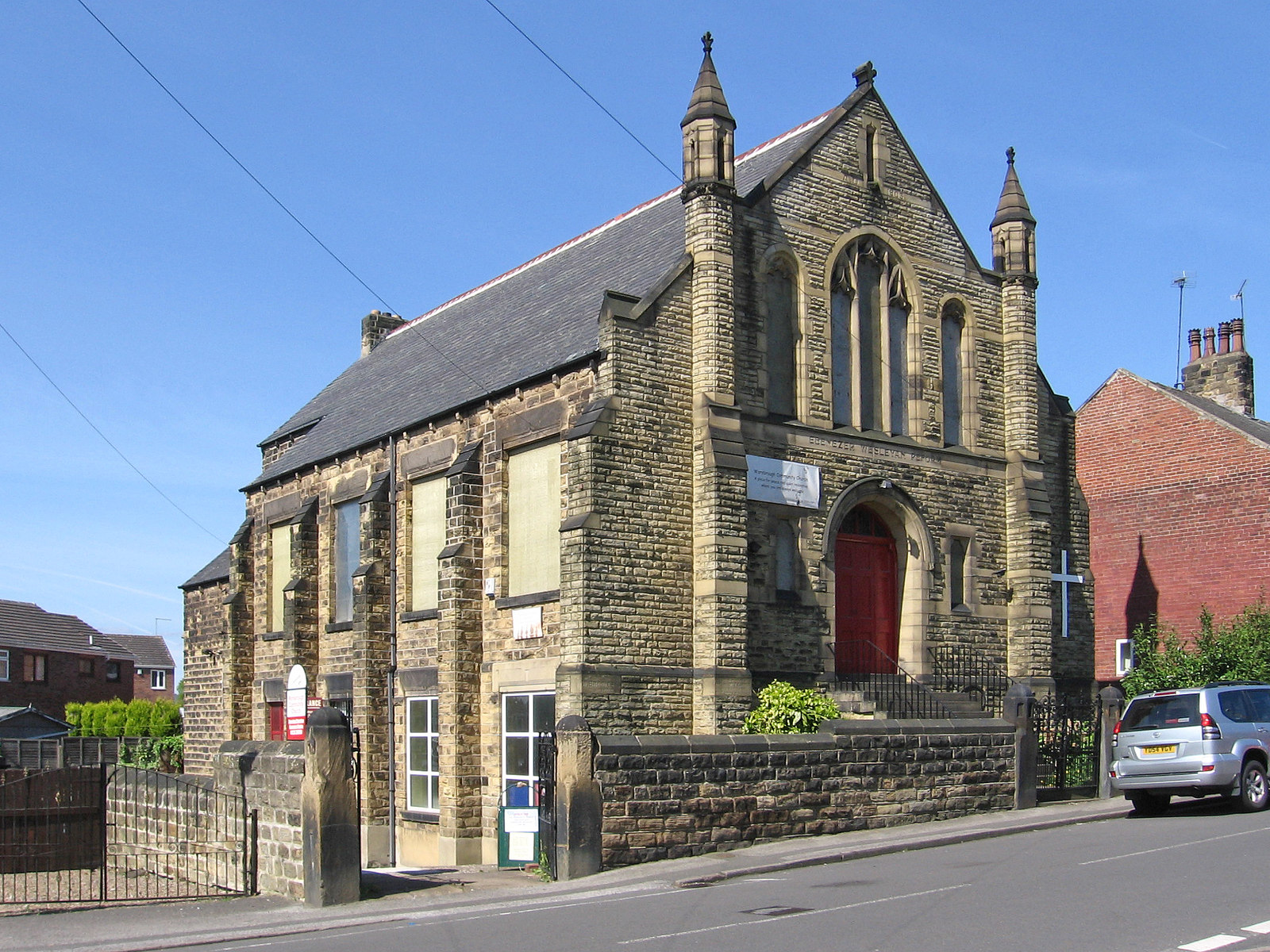
Community Church

On High Street, Worsbrough Dale. The east elevation bears the inscriptions "AD 1903" and "Ebenezer Wesleyan Reform". There are also foundation stones either side of the doorway inscribed with "EBENEZER CHAPEL 1854". This suggests that the chapel was built in 1854 and extended upwards in 1903.

== Education ==
The Barnsley Academy, before 2006 known as The Elmhirst School, provides secondary education in the area and neighbouring parts of Barnsley. The school moved approximately half a mile away to a new site on the recreational grounds that separate Bank End, Worsbrough from the neighbouring council estate of Kendray.

Primary schools in the Worsbrough area, include Birdwell Primary School (formerly Worsbro Birdwell Junior & Infants), Ward Green Primary School (formerly Worsbro Ward Green Junior & Infants), The Mill Academy (formerly St Edmunds Primary School, before amalgamation of Our Ladys RC Primary and Worsbro Lobwood Infant School), Bank End Primary Academy (formerly Worsbrough Bank End Junior & Infants) and Worsbrough St Mary's C of E Primary School. Worsbrough St Mary's C of E Primary School closed on 31 December 2007 as a consequence of falling pupil numbers.

Other schools in the area now closed, were, Worsbrough Dale Junior & Infants, Blacker Hill Primary (formerly Worsbro Blacker Infants). Worsbrough High School (formerly Whitecross Secondary Modern), which before its closure in 2006 was known as the Elmhirst School.

== Sport and recreation ==
Worsbrough Bridge Athletic F.C. are based in Worsbrough, next to the River Dove and currently play in the Northern Counties East Football League. The Trans Pennine Trail runs through Worsbrough along the path of a disused railway line. Outdoor bowls can be played at High Street Bowling Club in Worsbrough Dale and Kendal Vale Bowling Club in Worsbrough Bridge. Adjacent to Worsbrough Bridge Athletic F.C. and Kendal Vale Bowling Club is Worsbrough Bridge Cricket Club who compete in the Yorkshire Cricket Southern Premier League. Worsbrough Bridge Cricket Club are based next to the River Dove and play in divisions 3 and 8 of the YCSPL.

== Arts ==
The Worsbrough Mystery Plays are held at St Mary's Church. Worsbrough Brass are the local brass band.

== Notable residents ==
- Steve Agnew — local born professional footballer
- Jack Charlton — Football Manager and international footballer, lived at Rockley during the 1970s and 1980s
- Nick Crowe — artist born in Birdwell
- Nicky Eaden — local born professional footballer
- Leonard Elmhirst – philanthropist, educational reformer and agronomist
- Thomas Elmhirst – Royal Air Force commander
- Mick McCarthy, b. 1959 — professional international footballer and manager, born and bred in Worsbrough Bridge
- Arthur Scargill, b. 1938 — trade unionist, born in Worsbrough, still lives in the area
- Kathy Staff — actress, lived for several years in Rockley; a regular attendee of St Mary's Church in Worsbrough Village
- Charlie Williams — stand-up comedian, and former professional footballer lived at Birdwell

== See also ==
- Listed buildings in Worsbrough
