= Bilcliff =

Bilcliff is a surname. Notable people with the surname include:

- Bernard Bilcliff (1895–1979), English footballer
- Ray Bilcliff (1931–2009), English footballer
