= Paula Hammond =

Paula Hammond may refer to:

- Paula T. Hammond (born 1963), American chemical engineer
- Paula Christine Hammond (1944–2017), British magistrate and businesswoman
