= The Elmhirst School =

The Elmhirst School (Worsbrough High School)
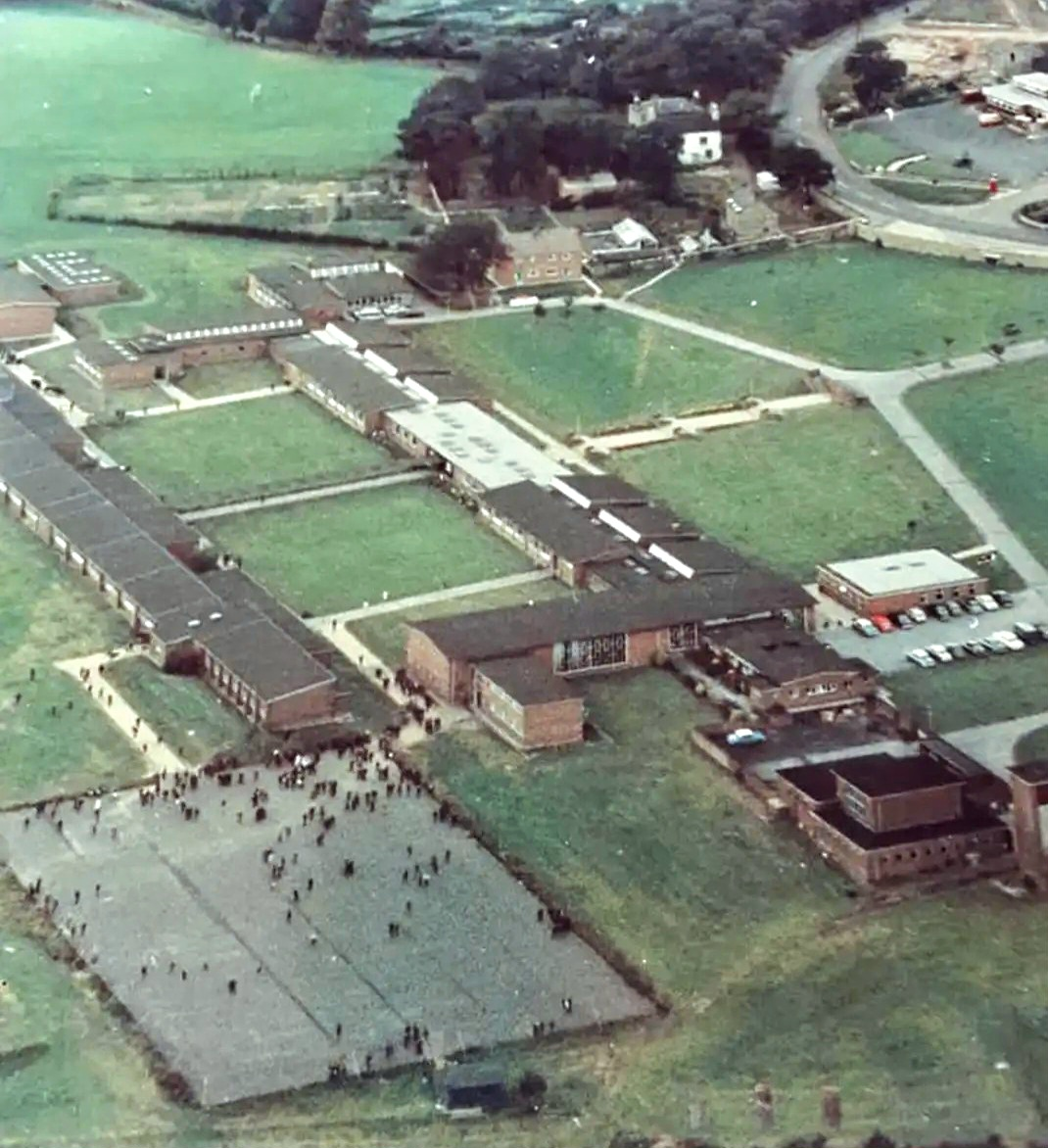
- Worsbrough High School, c. 1964

Location
- Worsbrough, Barnsley, South Yorkshire, S70 4RL
- 53.532°N 1.45007°W

Information
- Type: Secondary
- Religious affiliation: Church of England
- Established: 1952
- Closed: 2006
- Local authority: Metropolitan Borough of Barnsley
- Department for Education URN: 106647 Tables
- Ofsted: Reports
- Gender: Mixed
- Age: 11 to 16
- Enrolment: 560

The Elmhirst School (formerly known as White Cross and later Worsbrough High School), was a comprehensive school on Ardsley Road in the Bank End area of Worsbrough Dale, near Barnsley, South Yorkshire, England.

== History ==
The Secondary school was originally called White Cross Secondary Modern School on its opening in the early 1950s, under the auspices of the West Riding County Council and the local Worsbrough Urban District Council.

The school was built in an area of Worsbrough known as White Cross, for which the school, in its early years took its name.

In the mid 1960s the school changed name to Worsbrough High School, but was colloquially still referred to as Whitecross. In the late 1990s it became known as Elmhirst School. The school closed in 2006 and moved to a new site on recreation fields betwixt Bank End and Kendray, less than half a mile away. It is now called the Barnsley Academy after opening on the new site in 2006.

In October 2003, Barnsley Metropolitan Borough Council had decided to close the school in August 2004 and open a new 11–18 school, under the Fresh Start scheme. In February 2004, the council decided to close the school and open an Academy in September 2006 for ages 3–18, including Worsbrough Bank End and Kendray primary schools. It was to be done under Barnsley Council's Remaking Learning project. The Academy would have 420 primary places and 900 secondary places. Funding would come from the Department for Education and Skills, and £2m from the Academy's sponsor, the Church Schools Company (which became the United Church Schools Trust). It was actually sponsored by the United Learning Trust.

== Admissions ==
It admitted ages 11–16 from the Worsbrough and Ardsley areas. More than 50% of pupils were on free school meals. The Ardsley area has a very high teenage pregnancy rate, double the national rate, and much higher than the overall rate for Barnsley. Former high schools in this area that were outside the original Worsbrough catchment area, i.e., Kendray, Stairfoot, Ardsley were previously served by Kendray Oaks School and Priory School at Lundwood, both closing in the late 1980s along with Honeywell School.

As White Cross / Worsbrough High School, the school took in pupils from most schools in the Worsbrough Urban District apart from Worsbro Blacker Hill; feeder schools were Worsbrough Dale Juniors, Worsbrough Bank End Juniors, Worsbrough Ward Green Juniors, Worsbro Birdwell Juniors, Worsbrough St. Marys and most from Hunningley Lane Junior school.

== Academic performance ==
It was a low performing school, like many schools in Barnsley. From 2000, the schools results virtually halved. It was placed in special measures in 2003, and taken out of this restriction in November 2003. In 2003, its results for exams at 14 were the fifth lowest in England. In the same year, only 9% of pupils got 5 good GCSEs. By 2006, including English and Maths, only 6% of pupils got five good GCSEs including Maths and English. In that same year the school, in March 2006, was lifted from Special Measures into the Notice to Improve category by OFSTED. The Academy opened in the old building in September 2006. The Academy moved to its new building on 1 March 2009. In the Summer of 2010 the Academy saw 51% of its students achieve give good GCSEs including Maths and English – it was listed by the Department for Education as the most improved Academy in England.

== Alumni ==
=== White Cross Secondary School/Worsbrough High School ===
- Arthur Scargill 1949–53
- Mick McCarthy 1970–74
- Steve Agnew 1977–81
