= Chapeltown Central railway station =

Disused railway station in South Yorkshire, England

Chapeltown Central
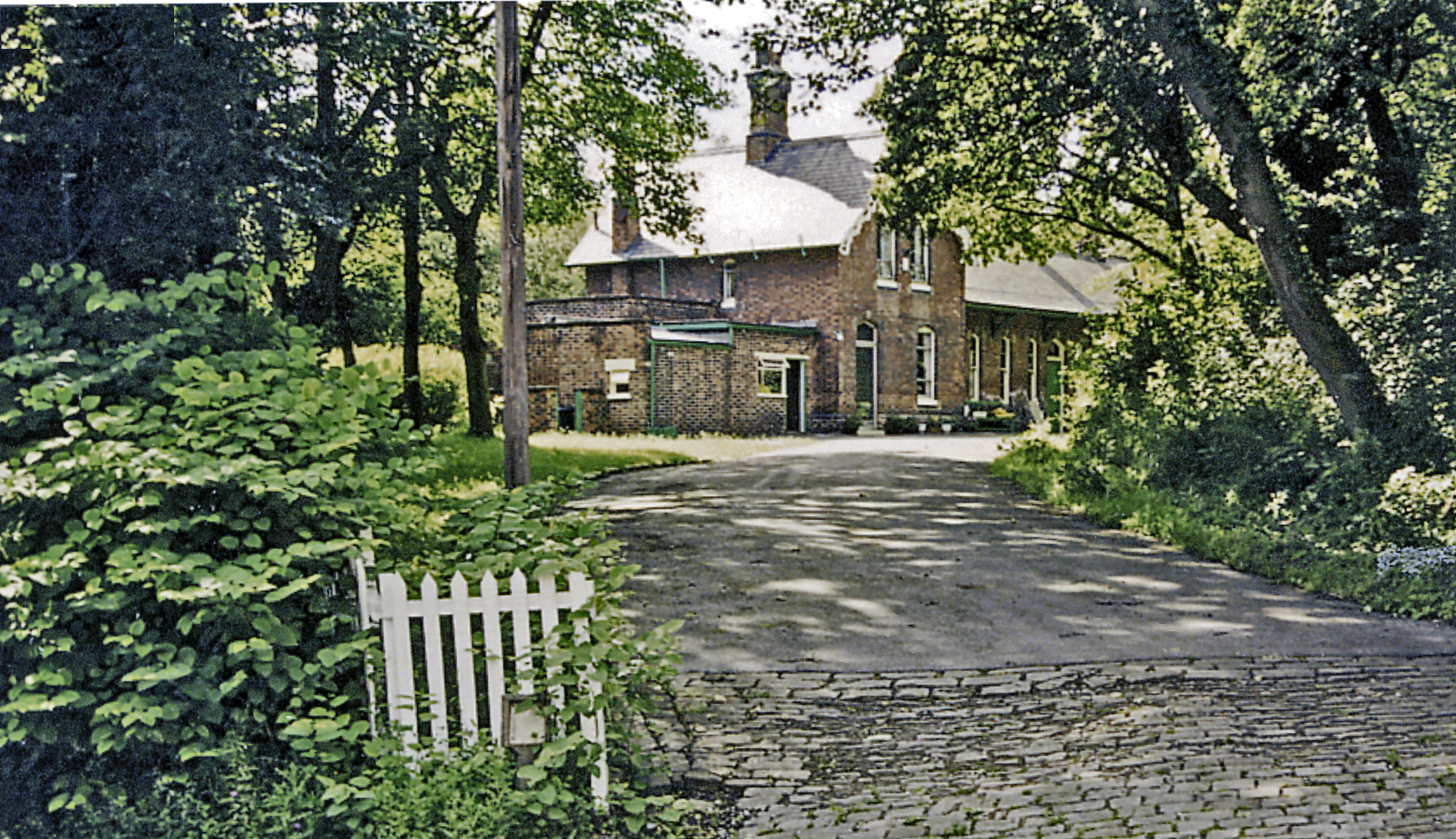
- Remains of the station in 1998

General information
- Location: Chapeltown, City of Sheffield; England
- Coordinates: 53.46846°N 1.46386°W
- Grid reference: SK356969
- Platforms: 2

Other information
- Status: Disused

History
- Pre-grouping: South Yorkshire Railway

Key dates
- 1854: opened
- 1953: Closure to passengers
- 1954: Closure to all traffic
Location

Chapeltown Central railway station was situated on the former South Yorkshire Railway's Blackburn Valley line between Ecclesfield East and Westwood. The station which was also known as Chapeltown and Thorncliffe was intended to serve Chapeltown, South Yorkshire, England, although about 1 mile (1.6 km) from its centre. It also served the works of Newton, Chambers & Company, one of the largest industrial companies in the area.

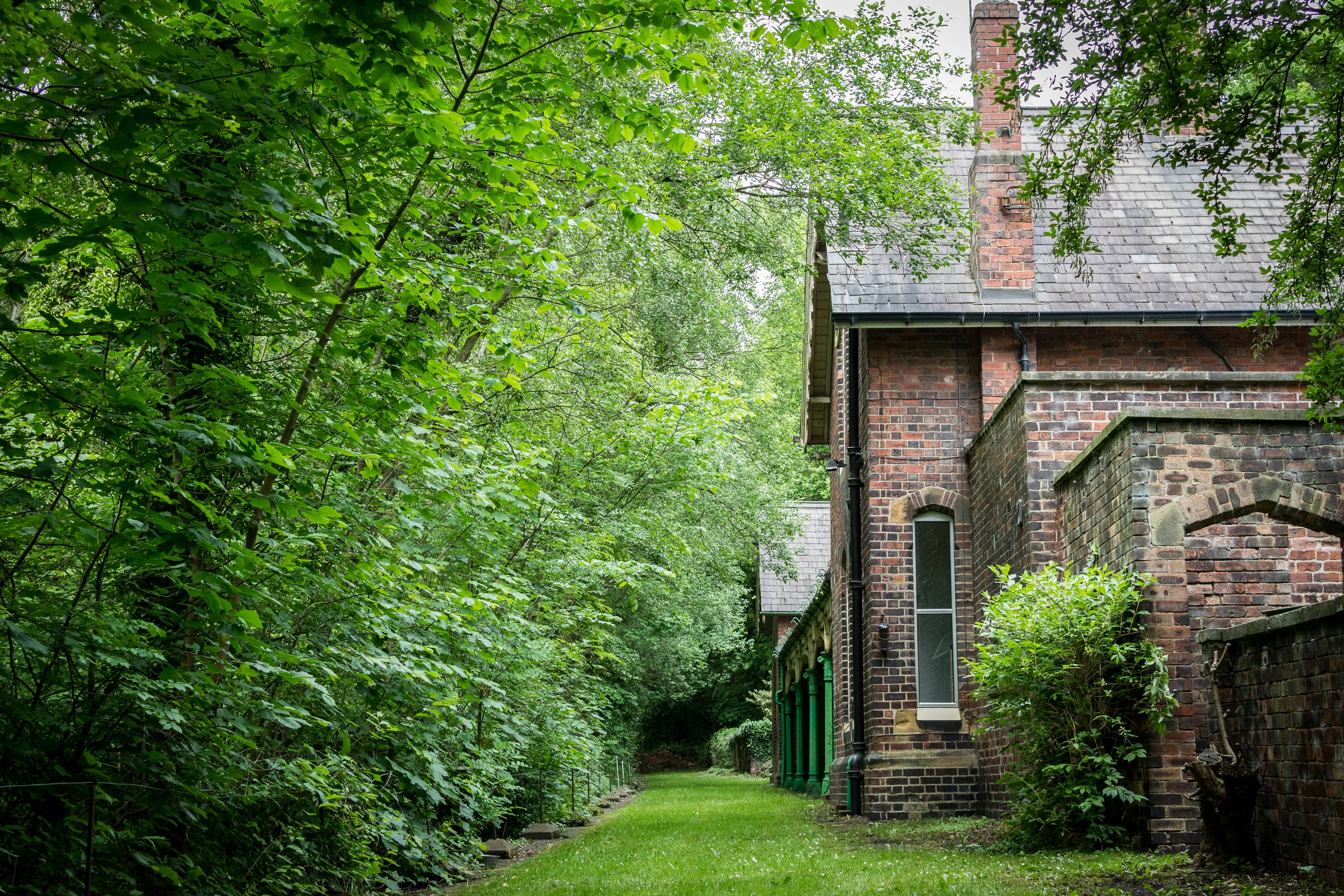
The station platform, June 2017

The original station which was mainly constructed of wood opened in 1854. The line at the time was only a single track and this was increasingly recognised as a bottle neck so plans were made to double this which began in 1875 and a new larger station was to be built on the north side of the track. The new station was built in the M.S.& L.R.'s Double Pavilion style and the building consisted of a station master's house, booking office, goods office, and first, second and third class waiting rooms. In order to make room for this an existing goods warehouse was demolished. The short single line platform was replaced by a double (up and down line) platform, an iron footbridge was constructed linking the two platforms and a new approach road built from the Sheffield-Barnsley turnpike road. The newly built station was officially opened to passengers on 5 November 1877.

In 1875 during excavations 150 yards (137 m) east of the station by navvies who were employed to double the track between Grange Lane and Chapeltown they came across the fossilised tree stump of a Giant Club Moss which would have grown tens of metres tall. It was originally taken and displayed at High Hazels park in Darnall before being transferred to the Sheffield Botanical Gardens in the 1980s where it can still be seen today.

Closure to passengers came on 7 December 1953 and to all traffic in April 1954. The station is now a private residence.

== See also ==
- Chapeltown railway station (formerly Chapeltown South), on the Hallam Line and Penistone Line, about 1/2 mile (0.8 km) south, is still open
