= Listed buildings in Rockingham Ward =

Rockingham is a ward in the metropolitan borough of Barnsley, South Yorkshire, England. The ward contains seven listed buildings that are recorded in the National Heritage List for England. All the listed buildings are designated at Grade II, the lowest of the three grades, which is applied to "buildings of national importance and special interest". The ward contains the village of Birdwell, part of the town of Hoyland, and the surrounding area. The listed buildings consist of a farmhouse and farm buildings, some of which have been converted for residential use, a church, a milepost, a memorial obelisk, and a ruined prospect tower.

== Buildings ==
| Name and location | Photograph | Date | Notes |
|---|---|---|---|
| Barn opposite Herons Way; 53.50896°N 1.47457°W | | Mid 18th century | The barn is in sandstone with quoins and a stone slate roof. There is one storey and five bays. The barn contains cart entries with quoined surrounds, slit vents, and hatches. |
| Hoyland Lowe Stand; 53.50424°N 1.45386°W | | 1750 | A prospect tower built for the 1st Marquess of Rockingham, it is in sandstone, with quoins and floor bands. It is a ruin and without a roof. There are two storeys, a square plan, and a square stair turret on the north side. The openings have square surrounds, and some are blocked. |
| Birdwell Obelisk; 53.50154°N 1.47972°W | | 1775 | The obelisk, which was built for the 2nd Earl of Strafford, is in sandstone. It is a tall obelisk with a pyramidal cap, on a steeped plinth with a projecting band. The plinth is inscribed with the date and the distance to Wentworth Castle. |
| Balk Farmhouse; 53.51515°N 1.48225°W | — | c. 1800 | The farmhouse is in sandstone on a plinth, with quoins, a sill band, and a hipped stone slate roof. There are two storeys and three bays. The central doorway has a fanlight and a cornice on corbels. The windows on the front are casements, and at the rear are mullioned windows and a tall round-headed stair window. |
| Barn southeast of Balk Farmhouse; 53.51496°N 1.48231°W | — | c. 1800 | The barn, later used for other purposes, is in sandstone, and has a hipped stone slate roof. There are two storeys and three bays. In the centre is a large cart entry with a quoined surround and a segmental head, to the left is a stable door, and there are three rows of slit vents and three square hatches. |
| St Peter's Church, Hoyland; 53.50258°N 1.45351°W | | 1830–31 | The church is in sandstone with a Welsh slate roof, and is in Gothic Revival style. It consists of a nave and a chancel in one unit, a north porch, a south vestry, a north organ projection, and a west steeple. The steeple has a three-stage tower with diagonal buttresses rising to pinnacles with carved heads and crockets, a two-light west window, clock faces on the north and south sides, a peaked parapet, and a recessed octagonal spire. The porch has a Tudor arched doorway, there are embattled parapets along the sides of the church, and a four-light east window. |
| Milepost; 53.48883°N 1.45531°W | | Mid 19th century | The milepost is on the east side of Sheffield Road (A6135 road). It is in cast iron, with angled sides and a swept top panel. The distances to Sheffield, Barnsley and London are given in raised lettering. |
