= Bernard Bilcliff =

English footballer (1895–1979)

Personal information
- Full name: Bernard Bilcliff
- Date of birth: 6 June 1904
- Place of birth: Chapeltown, South Yorkshire, England
- Date of death: 1955 (aged 50–51)
- Position: Goalkeeper

Senior career*
Years	Team	Apps	(Gls)
1924–1925	Chapeltown Primitives		
1925–1929	Chesterfield	60	(0)
1929–1930	Scarborough		
1930–1932	Halifax Town	66	(0)
1932	Shelbourne		
Total		126	(0)
- * Club domestic league appearances and goals

Bernard Bilcliff (2 December 1895 – 1979) was an English footballer who played in the Football League for Chesterfield and Halifax Town.
