= Listed buildings in Worsbrough =

Worsbrough is a ward in the metropolitan borough of Barnsley, South Yorkshire, England. The ward contains 46 listed buildings that are recorded in the National Heritage List for England. Of these, one is listed at Grade I, the highest of the three grades, four are at Grade II*, the middle grade, and the others are at Grade II, the lowest grade. The ward contains a central urban area and surrounding countryside. Most of the listed buildings are houses, cottages and associated structures, farmhouses and farm buildings. The other listed buildings include churches and items in a churchyard, a former school, a former corn mill, now a museum, a carved outcrop of sandstone, a bridge, a milepost, and a monument to a colliery disaster.

== Key ==
Grade	Criteria
I	Buildings of exceptional interest, sometimes considered to be internationally important
II*	Particularly important buildings of more than special interest
II	Buildings of national importance and special interest

== Buildings ==
Name and location	Photograph	Date	Notes	Grade
St Mary's Church; 53.51914°N 1.47406°W		12th century	The oldest material in the church is in the chancel, most of the church dates from the 14th and 15th centuries, and the church was partly remodelled in 1838 by J. P. Pritchett. The church is built in sandstone, and consists of a nave, north and south aisles, a south porch, a chancel with a south vestry, and a west steeple. The steeple has a tower with a blocked west doorway, clock faces in the north and south fronts, square-headed bell openings, a string course with corner gargoyles, an embattled parapet with corner pinnacles, and a recessed octagonal spire with a weathervane. The aisles also have embattled parapets, and the east window has three lights.	I
Farm building south of Houndhill; 53.53225°N 1.49255°W	—	16th century	The farm building is timber framed and encased in sandstone, and has a stone slate roof. There is a single storey and four bays. On the north side is an open arcade, with three posts in concrete plinths, curved braces to the wall plate, and studs in the spandrels. In the left return is a rebuilt gable with a 20th-century sliding door.	II
Barn southeast of Lower Lewden Farmhouse; 53.52759°N 1.44885°W	—	16th century	A house and a barn, later extended and a barn, it is in stone, with quoins, and a stone slate roof with two ventilator hoods. There are two storeys, and the barn contains doorways, vents, and windows, some of which are blocked or boarded.	II
Swaithe Hall Farmhouse, Rosebower Cottage and Swaithe Hall; 53.53545°N 1.43684°W	—	16th century	A farmhouse to which a larger house was added in about 1870. The farmhouse is timber framed and encased in sandstone, the house is in sandstone, and the roofs are in stone slate and Welsh slate with coped gables, kneelers, and finials. The farmhouse has a U-shaped plan, consisting of a single-bay hall range and gabled cross-wings. The house interlocks with the farmhouse, and has a T-shaped plan, and three storeys.	II
Houndhill; 53.53287°N 1.49264°W	—	1566	The earliest part of the house is the timber framed east wing, with the rest of the house added in the 17th century, and renovated in 1934. The rest of the house is in sandstone and the roof is in stone slate with coped gables on kneelers and finials. There are two storeys, cellars and attics, and an H-shaped plan, consisting of a main range and two gabled cross-wings. The doorway has chamfered jambs and a deep lintel, and the windows are mullioned or mullioned and transomed.	II*
Barn east of Lower Lewden Farmhouse; 53.52773°N 1.44913°W	—	Late 16th century	A house and a barn, later a barn, it is partly timber framed and partly in stone, and has a slate roof with two ventilator hoods. There are two storeys, and the openings include doorways, windows and loft doors.	II
Old School House and school 53.51940°N 1.47416°W	—	Late 16th or early 17th century	The school and school house, which were extended in the 19th century and later used for other purposes, are in sandstone, and have a Welsh slate roof with moulded gable copings on shaped kneelers. There are two storeys, the house has two bays, and the school forms a four-bay wing to the rear left. Some of the windows in the house are sashes, and others are mullioned or transomed.	II
Cruck barn, Swaithe Hall Farm; 53.53526°N 1.43590°W	—	16th or 17th century	The cruck barn has internal timber framing, it is encased in sandstone, and has quoins, and a roof of tile and felt. There is a single storey and three bays. In the centre is a doorway with another door to the left, and in the upper part of the wall on the left return is weatherboarding. Inside the barn are four pairs of cruck blades.	II
Worsbrough Corn Mill; 53.52547°N 1.47434°W		c. 1625	The corn mill was extended in 1843, and was later converted into a museum. It is in sandstone, and has roofs of stone slate and Welsh slate. The earlier part has two storeys and three internal bays. On the right is a wide doorway with an external ramp and a massive lintel, to the left is a four-light mullioned window, a massive buttress containing a small window, and another doorway. The upper floor contains a two-light and a three-light mullioned window, and in the left return is a first-floor doorway with a quoined surround and a massive lintel. The later part has three storeys and a loft, and four bays, the right bay projecting and containing a large round-arched window. In the third bay is a ramp and doorways in the ground and middle floors, and elsewhere are 36-pane casement windows. Inside the older part is an overshot waterwheel, and the later part contains an oil engine.	II*
Lower Lewden Farmhouse; 53.52771°N 1.44958°W	—	Early 17th century	The farmhouse is in sandstone with a stone slate roof. There are two storeys, and an L-shaped plan, consisting of a main range, a wing on the left with a hipped roof, and a stair projection in the angle. In the wing is a doorway with a quoined surround. The main range contains mullioned windows with hood moulds, and at the rear is a 20th-century conservatory.	II
Barn northeast of Lower Lewden Farmhouse; 53.52797°N 1.44917°W	—	Early 17th century	The barn, which was later extended, is in stone with a stone slate roof. There are two storeys, and external steps leading to a loft doorway. Elsewhere, there are other doorways, and windows, some originally mullioned.	II
Tower and wall west of Houndhill; 53.53289°N 1.49353°W		c. 1640–44	The tower was built as a defensive structure during the Civil War. The tower and roadside wall are in sandstone. The tower is circular, and has a doorway facing the farmhouse, with a chamfered and quoined surround and a curved lintel, and there are four small openings under a coped parapet. The wall has triangular copings, and rises over a blocked quoined doorway.	II
Rockley Old Hall and wall 53.52055°N 1.48606°W		17th century	A manor house later divided into three dwellings, it is in sandstone on a chamfered plinth and has a stone slate roof with gable copings, kneelers and finials. There are two storeys and attics, and a front of five gabled bays. Most of the windows are mullioned, most have hood moulds, and some also have transoms. The front garden is enclosed by a sandstone wall.	II
Worsbrough Hall; 53.52111°N 1.47270°W	—	17th century	A large house with wings added in about 1700, and later divided. It is in sandstone on a chamfered plinth, with a continuous hood mould, and a stone slate roof with coped gables and shaped kneelers. There is an E-shaped plan, with a central range, two gabled front wings, a two-storey porch, and two short rear wings. The central range and the left wing have two storeys and attics, and the right wing has three storeys. On the front, the porch has a Tudor arched doorway, over which is a cross window, and a coped gable with an apex finial base. Elsewhere there are mullioned windows, some also transomed, and sash windows.	II
Stable block, Swaithe Hall Farm; 53.53522°N 1.43624°W	—	1671	The stable block is in sandstone, with quoins, and an asbestos sheet roof with gable copings and shaped kneelers. The central doorway, converted into a window, has a quoined surround, a deep dated lintel, a keystone, and a hood mould. The windows are casements.	II
Darley Cliffe Hall, Tudor House, Dower Cottage and wall 53.53611°N 1.46517°W	—	Late 17th century	A large house later extended and divided, it is in sandstone with stone slate roofs. The main house has two storeys, a basement and attic, a double-depth plan, and five bays, corner strips, an eaves cornice, and a hipped roof. Steps lead up to the doorway that has a moulded surround, and a segmental pediment on consoles. The cellar windows are mullioned, and the other windows are sashes. On the right is a single-storey wing with a casement window. To the left, Tudor House is a wing with two storeys and an attic, and three bays. It has a gable with moulded copings and shaped kneelers. Further to the left is Dower House, a recessed wing with two storeys and two bays. The front garden wall is in brick on a plinth, with moulded coping and end piers. The central piers have cornices on consoles, and vase finials, and there are mounting steps.	II*
Elmhirst Farmhouse and Cottage; 53.53740°N 1.47126°W	—	Late 17th century (probable)	A farmhouse with an earlier care, later extended and divided, it is in sandstone, with quoins, and a tile roof with chamfered gable copings and shaped kneelers. There are two storeys, six bays, and a rear outshut. The doorway has a quoined surround, and the windows are a mix; some are mullioned, some are sashes, some of which are horizontally-sliding, others are casements, and there is a French window. Inside, there is an exposed cruck truss.	II
Swaithe House; 53.53229°N 1.43984°W	—	1680	A farmhouse to which another house was added in about 1720. They are in sandstone, the later house is stuccoed, and the roofs are in slate and stone slate. The older part has a doorway with a quoined surround and mullioned windows. The later part has three storeys and five bays, a plinth, quoins, floor bands, an eaves cornice, sash windows, and dormers. There is a three-bay pediment with an oeil-de-boeuf in the tympanum.	II*
Worsbrough Vicarage; 53.51989°N 1.47337°W	—	1696	The vicarage, which was later extended, is in pebbledashed sandstone, and has a stone slate roof with gable copings and shaped kneelers. The main range has two storeys and an attic, and three bays, to the right is a two-storey single-bay extension, and a rear wing on the right. Flanking the doorway are canted bay windows. Most of the windows are mullioned with hood moulds.	II
Genn House, outbuilding and wall 53.53638°N 1.48935°W	—	c. 1700	The house was extensively rebuilt in 1964, it is in sandstone, with quoins, and a stone slate roof with chamfered gable copings and shaped kneelers. There are two storeys and attics, and three bays. In the centre is a doorway with a quoined surround and a date plaque above, and the windows are sashes. Recessed on the left and linked by external steps is an outbuilding with a pair of quoined doorways, a mullioned window, and a hatch. The garden wall has a gate, and in the angle is an oval opening to a dog kennel under mounting steps.	II
1 Rockley Old Hall and garage 53.52074°N 1.48637°W	—	Early 18th century	A cowhouse and cart shed converted into a house and a garage in about 1980, it is in sandstone with stone slate roofs. The house has two storeys and three bays, quoins, three doorways with quoined surrounds, two converted into windows, casement windows, and gable copings on shaped kneelers. The former cartshed has a single storey and four bays, and is open fronted, the square piers with plinths and abaci.	II
2 and 2A Rockley Old Hall (The Great Barn); 53.52073°N 1.48590°W	—	Early 18th century	The barn was converted into two dwellings in about 1980. The building is in sandstone, with quoins, and a stone slate roof with chamfered gable copings and shaped kneelers. There are two storeys and five bays. In the centre is a glazed former wagon entry with a segmental head, chambered quoins and voussoirs. To the left is a French window, and elsewhere are casement windows and slit vents.	II
3 and 4 Rockley Old Hall; 53.52061°N 1.48560°W	—	Early 18th century	Cowhouses converted into two dwellings in about 1980, the building is in sandstone, with quoins, and a stone slate roof with chamfered gable copings and shaped kneelers. There are two storeys, five bays, and a single-storey rear wing. The central doorway has a quoined surround, and the windows are casements.	II
Rob Royd; 53.53522°N 1.49596°W	—	Early 18th century (probable)	A house that was later extended, it is in sandstone with quoins, decorative iron gutter brackets, and a Welsh slate roof with gable copings and shaped kneelers. There are two storeys and three bays. The doorway has an architrave and a bracketed cornice, and the windows are sashes. On the right return is a single-storey square bay window.	II
The Granary; 53.53627°N 1.48880°W	—	Early 18th century	A granary with a cowshed later converted into a house. It is in sandstone with quoins, and a stone slate roof with chamfered gable copings and shaped kneelers. There is a single storey and an attic, three bays, and a rear wing. In the centre is a doorway with a quoined surround, and the windows are casements.	II
Barncroft; 53.53647°N 1.46501°W	—	Early to mid 18th century	A farm building converted into a house in the 20th century, it is in sandstone, with quoins, and a stone slate roof. There are two storeys, three bays, and a later single-storey extension on the right. In the ground floor are three doorways with chamfered quoined surrounds and lintels, and casement windows. The upper floor contains three oculi in square surrounds.	II
The Gables; 53.53649°N 1.46546°W	—	Early to mid 18th century	A farm building converted into a house in the 20th century, it is in sandstone, with quoins, and a tile roof with coped gables and shaped kneelers. There are two storeys and three bays. The doorway has a quoined surround and a deep lintel, and in the ground floor are slit windows with casements. The upper floor contains chamfered oculi in square surrounds.	II
The Mill Cottage; 53.52536°N 1.47405°W	—	Mid 18th century (probable)	A house, later used as an office, it is in sandstone, with quoins, and a stone slate roof with chamfered gable copings and shaped kneelers on the left. There are two storeys, three bays, a rear wing on the left, and a single-room extension. The central doorway has a quoined surround and a deep lintel, and the windows are sashes, some with mullions.	II
The High Stone; 53.53874°N 1.47734°W	—	1756	A natural outcrop of sandstone carved with three blind round-arched recesses. Above these is a sunk panel inscribed with the date and an initial.	II
Sundial west of Darley Cliffe Hall; 53.53599°N 1.46582°W	—	1756	The sundial is in sandstone, and has an octagonal foot, and a vase-shaped pedestal with bead moulding round the neck. There is moulding round the brass dial that has a decorative gnomon.	II
Home Farmhouse; 53.51854°N 1.47422°W	—	Mid to late 18th century	A full width extension was added to the rear in the 20th century. The farmhouse is in sandstone with quoins, a floor band, and a tile roof with coped gables on kneelers. There are two storeys and five bays. The central doorway has an architrave and a cornice, and the windows are sashes with keystones.	II
7 Worsbrough Village; 53.51987°N 1.47381°W	—	Late 18th century	A sandstone cottage with a Welsh slate roof, two storeys and two bays. In the centre, a previous doorway with a quoined surround has been converted into a window, a doorway has been inserted to the left, and the windows are casements.	II
Cowhouse with hayloft, Home Farm; 53.51845°N 1.47446°W	—	Late 18th century	The cowhouse and hayloft are in stone with quoins and a stone slate roof. The building has two storeys and five bays. It contains an arched wagon entry with a quoined surround and a keystone, windows, and two square hatches.	II
Ouslethwaite Hall; 53.53618°N 1.48566°W	—	Late 18th century	A large house divided into flats, it is in sandstone with quoins and a hipped tile roof. There are three storeys, a double-depth plan, five bays, and a lower two-storey one-bay extension on the right extending as a rear wing. Steps lead up to the central Doric porch that has a full entablature, and a doorway with a fanlight. The windows are sashes with raised surrounds. In the wing is a blocked doorway with a pulvinated frieze and a cornice, and a Venetian window. At the rear is a round-headed stair window, and external steps leading to a door.	II
5 Worsbrough Village; 53.51991°N 1.47374°W	—	c. 1800	A sandstone cottage, with quoins, and a Welsh slate roof with a coped gable on the right with kneelers. There are three storeys and one bay. All the openings have square-faced stone surrounds, and the windows are sashes, those in the top floor are horizontally-sliding.	II
Farmbuildings and Ouslethwaite Cottage; 53.53642°N 1.48513°W	—	Late 18th or early 19th century	The buildings include a stable block, a dovecote, and a cottage. They are in sandstone, with quoins, and roofs of stone slate or asbestos sheet, with a coped gable on the right with kneelers. The buildings are mainly in two storeys, and with an L-shaped plan. There is an archway with a cottage to the left and to the right are external steps with a dog kennel beneath. The dovecote is a tower with four storeys, and in the ground floor is a segmental-arched carriage entry and a doorway with a quoined surround. In the third floor is a blind lunette, and above is a hipped roof and a louvred lantern.	II
Wall and steps, Ouslethwaite Hall; 53.53602°N 1.48567°W	—	Late 18th or early 19th century	The wall and steps are in sandstone, and the central gate piers are approached by steps on two sides of a stone platform. The flanking retaining garden walls have convex panels, and pillars with ogee tops. The gate piers are square with moulded edges.	II
Wall to rear and left of Ouslethwaite Hall; 53.53615°N 1.48666°W	—	Late 18th or early 19th century	The wall encloses the two gardens to the rear and left of the hall. It is in red brick, with the external face in sandstone, and stone copings. The front wall has piers and throughstones, and is curved at the left corner. The wall incorporates a lean-to shed and doorways.	II
Bridge north of Worsbrough Mill Museum; 53.52603°N 1.47443°W		1809	The bridge is in sandstone, and consists of a single segmental arch. It has voussoirs. parapets with domed copings linked by iron cramps, and splayed wing walls with end piers.	II
1–4 Foundry Yard; 53.52659°N 1.47214°W	—	Early 19th century	A row of former workers' cottages, they are in sandstone with a Welsh slate roof. There are three storeys and four bays. The doorways are paired and have monolithic jambs and deep lintels, and the windows are 20th-century casements with wedge lintels.	II
Worsbrough Hall Flats; 53.52139°N 1.47284°W	—	Early 19th century	Originally the service wing to Worsbrough Hall, and later converted for residential use, it is in sandstone with stone slate roofs, coped gables and shaped kneelers. There are three storeys, an irregular U-shaped plan, an east front of six bays, the middle bay and end bays projecting and gabled, a free-standing southern wing, and a double northern wing. The middle bay has a gabled porch and a bellcote, and in the right bay is an arched entry. Most of the windows are mullioned.	II
Milepost; 53.53518°N 1.46456°W		Mid 19th century	The milepost is at the junction of Park Road (A61 road) and Kingwell Road. It is in cast iron with a triangular plan and a swept top. On the top in raised lettering is the distance to London, and on the sides are the distances to Sheffield and Barnsley.	II
Church of St. Thomas and St. James; 53.53484°N 1.46193°W		1857–59	The north chapel was added to the church in 1879. The church is built in sandstone with a Welsh slate roof, and is in Early English style. It consists of a nave with a clerestory, north and south aisles, a south porch, and a chancel with north and south vestries, the latter rising as a steeple. The steeple has a tower with three stages, angle buttresses, string courses between the stages, and paired bell openings under a corbel table. It is surmounted by an octagonal broach spire with lucarnes and a weathervane.	II
Colliery explosion monument 53.53471°N 1.46203°W	—	1878	The monument is in the churchyard of the Church of St. Thomas and St. James, and commemorates those lost in the Swaith Main colliery disaster of 1875. It is in sandstone, and has a chamfered base, and an inscribed panel, above which is a cornice, and a block with granite corner shafts flanking panels with depictions of tools and a colliery scene. At the top is a dome with carved panels, surmounted by a cross.	II
Church of Our Lady and St. James; 53.52751°N 1.46746°W		1901–02	The church is in sandstone with a Westmorland slate roof. It consists of a nave with a north porch, a narrower chancel with a south tower in the angle, and an adjoining vestry. The tower contains a south priest's door, above which is a slit window, a bell stage with semi-octagonal piers and trefoils, a continuous hood mould and a lead-covered spire with corner spirelets and a turret at the northeast corner. Most of the windows are lancets.	II
Lych gate, Church of Our Lady and St. James; 53.52737°N 1.46747°W	—	1902 (probable)	The lych gate at the entrance to the churchyard is in sandstone, and is in Gothic Revival style. It consists of a double-chamfered arch with a hood mould, and an inscribed panel. There are flanking buttresses with moulded copings, and an apex cross. The gates are in iron.	II
