= Sue Campbell, Baroness Campbell of Loughborough =

British sports administrator and noble (born 1948)

The Right Honourable The Baroness Campbell of Loughborough DBE

Member of the House of Lords
- Lord Temporal
- Life peerage 10 November 2008

Personal details
- Born: October 10, 1948 (age 77)
- Party: Crossbench
- Education: Long Eaton Grammar School; Bedford College of Physical Education; University of Leicester

Susan Catherine Campbell, Baroness Campbell of Loughborough (born 10 October 1948) is a British sports administrator who was chair of UK Sport between 2003 and 2013.

== Educational career ==
Campbell was educated at Long Eaton Grammar School and Bedford College of Physical Education, followed by the University of Leicester where she obtained a Master of Education degree. She worked as a physical education teacher at Whalley Range High School in Manchester for two years in the early 1970s, before becoming deputy director of Physical Education at Leicester University in 1972. She was a lecturer in the Department of Physical Education and Sports Science at Loughborough University from 1976.

Campbell has received the following Honorary academic degrees: Hon Doctorate of Education from the Council for National Academic Awards 1992, Hon Doctorate of Science from the University of Brighton 1993, Hon Doctorate of Education from De Montfort University 1996, Hon Doctorate of Technology from the University of Loughborough 1997, Hon Doctorate of Education from the University of Leicester 2000, Hon Doctorate of Sport Science from the Leeds Metropolitan University 2006, Hon Doctorate of Law from the University of Exeter 2010, Hon Doctor of Humane Letters Endicott College Boston USA 2011, Hon Doctorate of Art from the Bedfordfordshire University 2011, Hon Doctorate for Exceptional Service to Sport from the Queen's University 2013, Hon Degree of Science from the Nottingham Trent University 2016, Honorary Doctorate of Sport from the University of Chichester in 2024.

== Career ==
In 1980, Campbell was appointed regional officer for the East Midlands by the Sports Council of Great Britain. She was deputy chief executive of the National Coaching Foundation for one year in 1984, before becoming its chief executive for a decade, 1985 to 1995. She was appointed MBE in the 1991 New Year Honours. Campbell became chief executive of the Youth Sport Trust in 1995, having played a key role in setting it up. She was an adviser to the Department of Culture, Media and Sport and the Department for Education and Skills from 2000 to 2003.

In 2003 Campbell was appointed as chair of UK Sport, the new name for the Sports Council of Great Britain, and appointed Commander of the Order of the British Empire (CBE) in the Queen's Birthday Honours list the same year. She held this position for two terms until April 2013, presiding over Team GB and Paralympic GB's performance at the London 2012 games. Campbell retained her executive position with the Youth Sport Trust until 2005 when she became its chairman. Campbell stepped down as Chair of the Youth Sport Trust in December 2017.

On 10 November 2008 she was, on recommendation by the House of Lords Appointments Commission, created Baroness Campbell of Loughborough, of Loughborough in the County of Leicestershire. Lady Campbell of Loughborough sits on the crossbenches of the House of Lords. She chose to make her maiden speech on the subject of the London 2012 Olympic and Paralympic Games.

Campbell was appointed Head of Women's Football with The Football Association in March 2016, and became Director of Women's Football in January 2018. She was appointed Dame Commander of the Order of the British Empire (DBE) in the 2020 New Year Honours for services to sport.

She was interviewed on Desert Island Discs by Lauren Laverne in January 2020, selecting "Music of My Heart" by Gloria Estefan and NSYNC, Long Walk to Freedom by Nelson Mandela, and a photo album as her chosen favourite song, book and luxury item respectively.

In September 2023, the Football Association announced her retirement, due to take place in 2024.

== Influence ==
In February 2013 she was assessed as one of the 100 most powerful women in the United Kingdom by Woman's Hour on BBC Radio 4.
