= Francis Hill =

British solicitor and historian

Sir James William Francis Hill CBE FSA (15 September 1899 – 6 January 1980) was a British solicitor and leading historian of Lincoln and Lincolnshire. He was the third Chancellor of the University of Nottingham. He also served as a Councillor, Alderman and Mayor of Lincoln. The Sir Francis Hill Community Primary School on Bristol Drive, Lincoln was named in his honour.

== Early life ==
Hill was born in Lincoln and was educated at the Municipal Technical Day School (later City School), Monk's Road, Lincoln. He gained an open scholarship to Trinity College, Cambridge, but first served at the end of the First World War in the King's Royal Rifle Corps. He graduated from Cambridge with a double first and proceeded to MA in 1925.

== Career ==
In 1926, Hill qualified as a solicitor and he went on to become a senior partner in the firm of Andrew and Company in Lincoln. He also had a long and successful career in civic governance as a councillor and later alderman of the City Council from 1932 to 1974 and was Mayor of Lincoln in 1945/1946. In 1934 he became a member of the University of Nottingham College Council and was Chancellor of the University from 1972 to 1978.

Hill was involved in municipal government both nationally and internationally. He was chairman of the English Association of Municipal Corporations, 1957 to 1966, president of the European Conference of Local Authorities, 1966 to 1968, president of the International Union of Local Authorities, 1967 to 1971, and a member of the Royal Commission on Local Government in England, 1966 to 1969, which produced the Redcliffe-Maud report.

== Publications and articles by Sir Francis Hill ==
- Medieval Lincoln, Cambridge University Press, 1948 xvii, 487 p. : ill., maps.
- Tudor and Stuart Lincoln, Cambridge University Press,
- Georgian Lincoln, Cambridge University Press 1966
- Victorian Lincoln, Cambridge University Press 1974. ISBN 9780521079273
- Early Days of a Society, Lincolnshire History and Archaeology Vol.1. pp 57–63

== Bibliography ==
- Baker F.T (1992), Sir Francis Hill in C. Sturman, (ed.), Some historians of Lincolnshire (Occasional papers in Lincolnshire History and Archaeology, no. 9 -Society for Lincolnshire History and Archaeology, Lincoln)

Academic offices
Preceded by The Duke of Portland	Chancellor of the University of Nottingham; 1971–1978	Succeeded by Gordon Hobday
