= Keith Matthewman =

His Honour Keith Matthewman (1936–2008) was a judge who retired in 2001. He was known for his outspoken views. He was the first judge to have a regular slot on British television.

== Biography ==
Matthewman was born 8 January 1936 in Birdwell in South Yorkshire to Frank and Elizabeth Matthewman before his family moved to Chilwell where he attended Long Eaton Grammar School in Derbyshire. He then attended University College London, graduating in 1957 with a degree in law.

Matthewman worked as a salesman and teacher whilst undertaking study in his spare time for the bar exam before joining the licensing department of Rolls-Royce. In 1962 he joined a law practice, and although offered an opportunity to be a Labour Party M.P. he stayed in the legal profession and was made a circuit judge in 1977.

He came to prominence when he appeared on television Caution: Our Hands Are Tied in 1992 and later in Central TV's Crimestalker. He retired in 2001.
