= Chapeltown railway station =

Railway station in South Yorkshire, England

Chapeltown
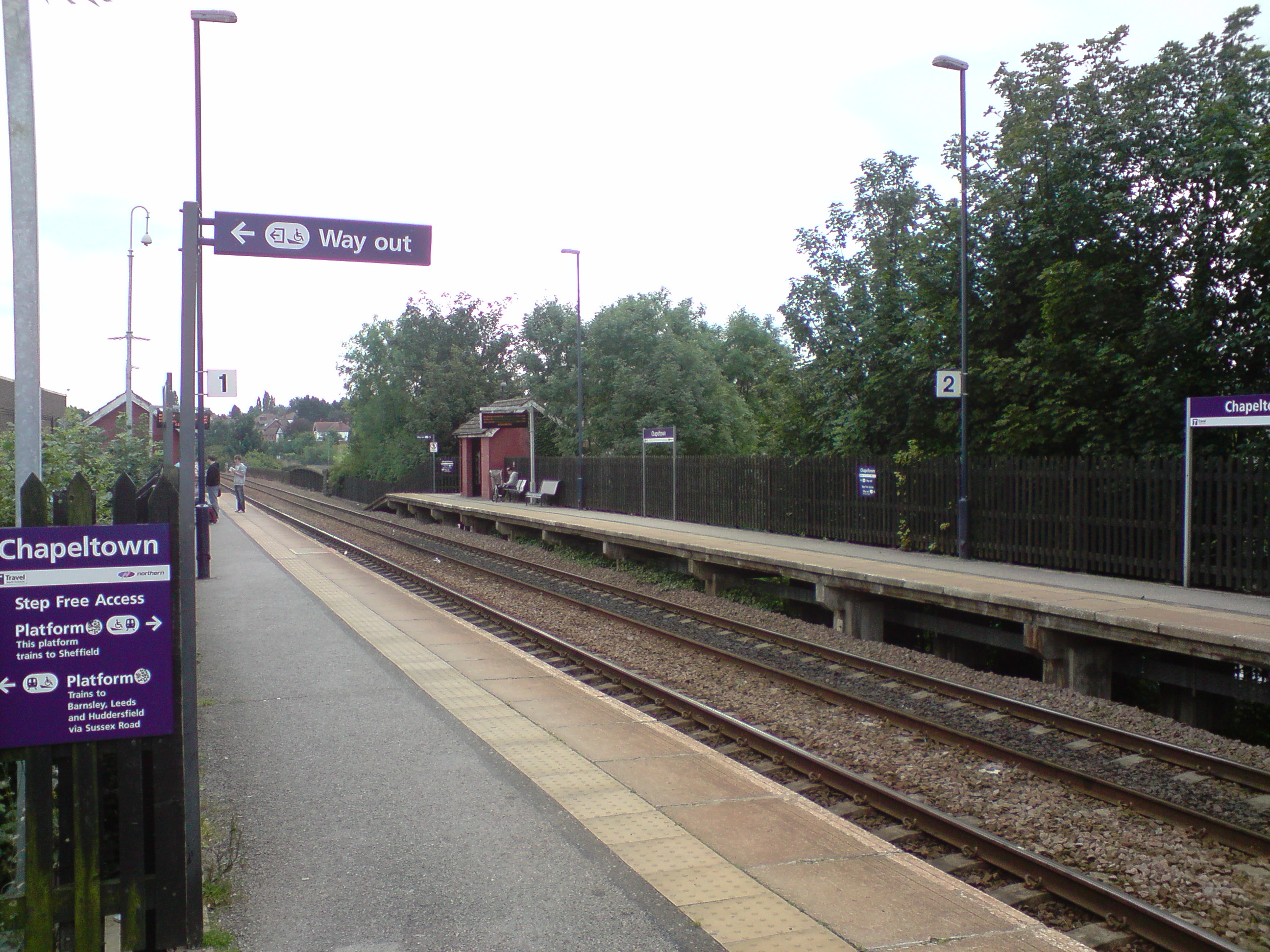
- Chapeltown station viewed from the entrance from the Asda supermarket.

General information
- Location: Chapeltown, City of Sheffield; England
- Coordinates: 53.462300°N 1.466250°W
- Grid reference: SK355963
- Manager: Northern Trains
- Transit authority: Travel South Yorkshire
- Platforms: 2

Other information
- Station code: CLN
- Fare zone: Sheffield
- Classification: DfT category F1

History
- Opened: 1897; 129 years ago (first station opened); 1984; 42 years ago present station opened

Passengers
- 2020/21: ▼74,514
- 2021/22: ▲0.254 million
- 2022/23: ▲0.283 million
- 2023/24: ▲0.330 million
- 2024/25: ▲0.383 million
Location
Notes
- Passenger statistics from the Office of Rail and Road

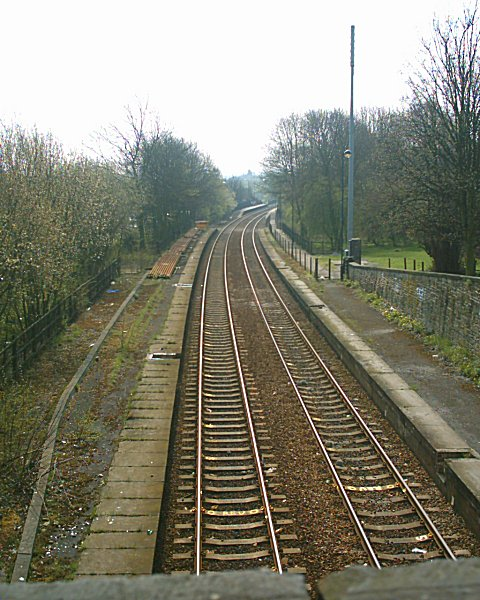
Chapeltown railway station, old (foreground) and new (in distance)

Chapeltown railway station, originally known as Chapeltown South, is a railway station serves the Sheffield suburb of Chapeltown in South Yorkshire, England. The station is 7 1/4 miles (12 km) north of Sheffield on the Hallam and Penistone Lines. As you enter the station on the Asda side you can see the old platforms.

== History ==
The present station was the first to be opened under the governance of the South Yorkshire Passenger Transport Executive in 1984; the original station, just over 2,000 feet (600 m) nearer to Barnsley, closed at the same time. The platforms, shown in the photograph of the old station looking towards the new station just visible in the distance, were retained, the Barnsley-bound platform being used as a walkway to connect the original access to the new station.

The station featured in an episode of the 8th season of the BBC documentary series Great British Railway Journeys in January 2017 - presenter Michael Portillo began the third leg of his journey from Blackpool to Harwich there, visiting local beauty spot Wharncliffe Crags before later rejoining the train at the station to travel on to Sheffield, Conisbrough and Doncaster.

== Facilities ==
The concrete platforms each have a "bus stop" style waiting shelter, along with timetable information boards, CIS displays and bench seating; a customer help point is located on platform 2. Though the station is unstaffed, a self-service ticket machine is provided for travellers to buy them prior to boarding or collect advance purchase tickets. The station is not listed as accessible on the National Rail website, but there is step-free access to the southbound side via the supermarket car park and along the pathway from Sussex Road northbound (along the old station platform).

== Services ==
Services run twice an hour Monday to Saturday to Sheffield (hourly on Sundays) and hourly to Huddersfield on the Penistone Line and Leeds on the Hallam Line respectively (two-hourly Sundays).

== See also ==
- Chapeltown Central railway station, on the Blackburn Valley line, about 1/2 mile (0.8 km) north, closed in 1954

Preceding station	National Rail	Following station
Meadowhall	Northern Trains Hallam Line	Elsecar
Meadowhall	Northern Trains Penistone Line	Elsecar
