= High Royds railway station =

Disused railway station in South Yorkshire, England

High Royds

General information
- Location: Shortwood, Barnsley; England
- Coordinates: 53.510493°N 1.463680°W
- Grid reference: SE356016

Other information
- Status: Disused

History
- Original company: South Yorkshire Railway

Key dates
- 4 September 1854: opened
- 1856: closed
Location

High Royds, a small mining community near Barnsley in South Yorkshire is not to be confused with High Royds, near Menston in West Yorkshire, served by the Wharfedale Line and the site of a former mental health institution.

High Royds railway station was situated on the South Yorkshire Railway's Blackburn Valley line between Birdwell & Hoyland Common and Dovecliffe. The station opened on 4 September 1854 and closed just two years later, one of the most short-lived stations in the county. The station was situated at the small settlement of Shortwood, between Birdwell and Upper Hoyland

== Route ==
Preceding station	Disused railways	Following station
Dovecliffe	South Yorkshire Railway	Birdwell & Hoyland Common
