= Birdwell & Hoyland Common railway station =

Disused railway station in South Yorkshire, England

Birdwell & Hoyland Common
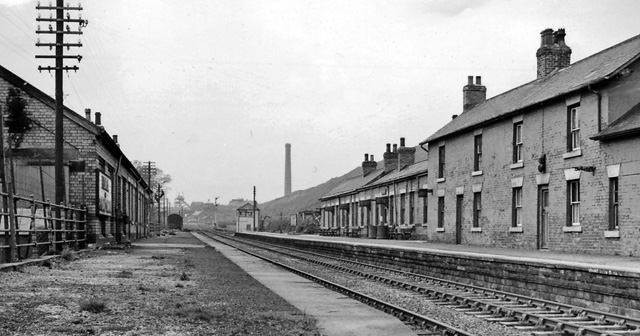
- View in 1961

General information
- Location: Tankersley, Barnsley; England
- Coordinates: 53.49717°N 1.48424°W
- Grid reference: SE343001
- Platforms: 2

Other information
- Status: Disused

History
- Original company: South Yorkshire Railway
- Post-grouping: London and North Eastern Railway

Key dates
- February 1855: opened
- 7 December 1953: closed
Location

Birdwell & Hoyland Common railway station was a railway station on the South Yorkshire Railway's Blackburn Valley line between Westwood and High Royds. The station was intended to serve the villages of Tankersley, Pilley, Birdwell and Hoyland Common, near Barnsley, Yorkshire, although the original chosen site was moved half a mile nearer towards Barnsley to serve the purposes of the Earl of Wharncliffe who was, at that time, sinking Wharncliffe Silkstone Colliery nearby. This move away made the station less convenient for most of the population.

The station was opened in February 1855, the building having an ornate canopy over its entrance and the buildings containing a private waiting room for the use of the Earl of Wharncliffe. Closure came on 7 December 1953.

Although named Birdwell and Hoyland Common station, the station was eventually built in nearby Tankersley.

== Route ==
Preceding station	Disused railways	Following station
High Royds; Line and station closed	Great Central Railway; South Yorkshire Railway	Westwood; Line and station closed
