= The Long Eaton School =

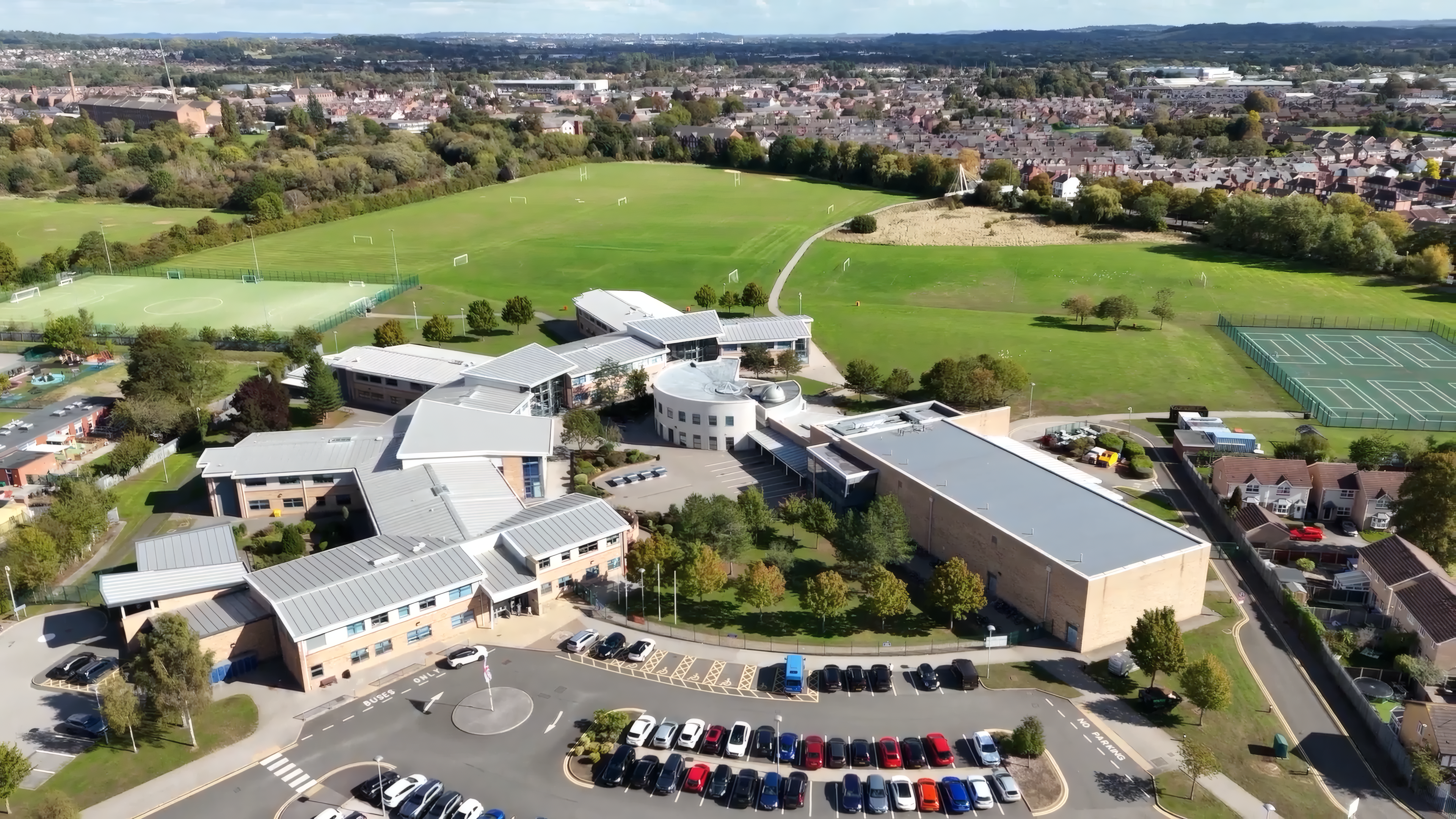

Location
- Thoresby Road; Long Eaton, Derbyshire, NG10 3NP; England; 52.891°N 1.282°W

Information
- Type: Academy
- Motto: Transforming Lives, Empowering Students.
- Established: 29 October 1910; 115 years ago
- Local authority: Derbyshire
- Educational authority: Derbyshire
- Trust: Archway Learning Trust
- Department for Education URN: 136716 Tables
- Ofsted: Reports
- Chair of Academic Advisory Board: Melanie Ennis
- Principal: Mark Shipman
- Gender: Mixed
- Age: 11 to 18
- Enrolment: 1,088
- Previously: Long Eaton Higher Elementary School and Pupil Teachers' Centre (1910–1945)
- Previously: Long Eaton Grammar School (1945–1989)
- Previously: Long Eaton Community School (1989–1999)
- Website: https://www.longeaton.derbyshire.sch.uk/

The Long Eaton School is a secondary Academy on Thoresby Road in Long Eaton located between Nottingham and Derby.

== History ==
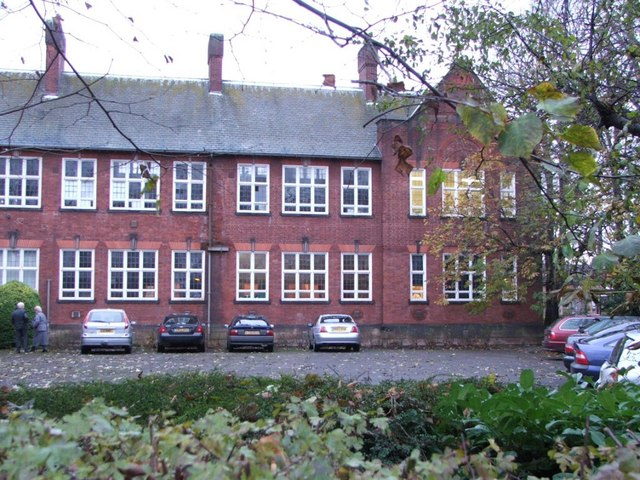
The former "LEGS" Grammar School building still stands in 2008

The £14,900 school opened on 29 October 1910 as the Long Eaton Higher Elementary School and Pupil Teachers' Centre on Tamworth Road. The first headmaster was Samuel Clegg. The school was created for Clegg on the recommendation of Prof. Michael Sadler (who was to go on and found universities). In 1913, the school became known as Long Eaton County Secondary School. In 1916, school dinners were introduced, with most of the vegetables being grown on site. In 1918, the school leaving age was raised from 12 to 14.

In 1945, it became the Long Eaton Grammar School. In 1972, it merged with the nearby Roper Secondary modern school, built in 1964, to become a comprehensive school. In 1989, it was renamed the Long Eaton Community School, to return to being known as The Long Eaton School in 1999.

=== New site ===
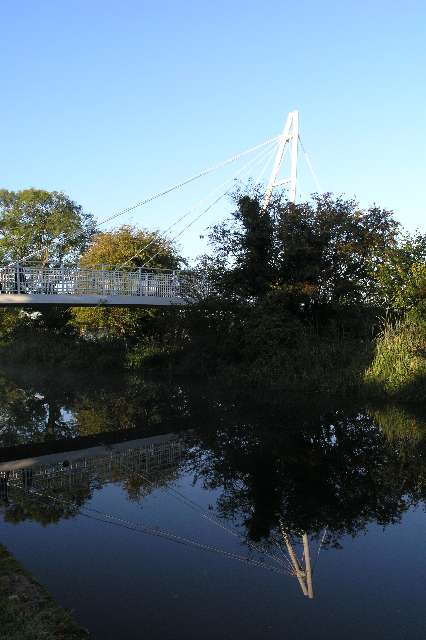
The footbridge over the canal built for the school

On 14 February 2006, the former building which had been the grammar school on Tamworth Road (B6540), close to Long Eaton's centre, was closed. Part of the old buildings were demolished for housing. That part was previously used for years 10–11 (ages 15–16) and also the Sixth Form. A brand new £15m school was built, under PFI funding by Babcock & Brown, adjacent to the former Roper School site, on the other side of the Erewash Canal. The new school is accessible via a footbridge over the canal. The former buildings of the Roper School were demolished. The new school is surrounded by a large security fence. It was built under the same PFI contract as Newbold Community School in Chesterfield.

It is a specialist science college, with an Eco status. The school had a new building built in 2005 and was visited by Gordon Brown on 10 November 2006 for the official opening. In September 2007, the school had to close for two days due to a water contamination of Legionnaire's disease.

In March 2020, like many schools in the United Kingdom, the school closed its doors to everyone except those with parents as key workers due to the COVID-19 pandemic.

=== Academy status ===
The school consulted on conversion to Academy status as an Outstanding school, under the provisions of the Academies Act 2010, in the autumn of 2010. Although the process was made more complex by the school's PFI arrangements, conversion took place in April 2011. The Academy does not have a sponsor, and has retained the name The Long Eaton School.

In 2016 the school was approved as an Academy sponsor, and created a multi-Academy Trust operating under the name The Northworthy Trust. In 2021, the school, along with the other schools in The Northworthy Trust, were transferred to Archway Learning Trust.

=== Observatory ===
Building on its specialism in science, the school has developed expertise in astronomy, and used to offer the subject at GCSE level as well as through evening community and "family learning" events, which no longer take place following the COVID-19 pandemic. It is part of two national programmes – Leading Space Education and Astroschools. In July 2011 work began on building The Malcolm Parry Observatory, a project funded partly by the Wolfson Foundation, which was opened in 2012.

== Former teachers ==
- Charles Bungay Fawcett, leading British geographer, professor of geography at the universities of Leeds and London.
- Frederick L. Attenborough – joined in 1913. Married Samuel Clegg's (the headmaster) daughter Mary. Their children would be Lord (Richard) Attenborough, Sir David Attenborough, and John Attenborough. Samuel Clegg remained headmaster until he died in 1930. Richard Attenborough used to reside at Bothe Hall just over a mile down the road in Sawley, on Tamworth Road.

== Notable students ==
- Baroness Sue Campbell MBE, (1948–), Chairman: UK Sport
- Alec Clegg (1909–1986), Chief Education Officer, West Riding of Yorkshire County Council (1945–74), and the son of Samuel Clegg.
- Harry Godwin FRS (1901–1985), botanist
- Paula Christine Hammond MBE, JP (1944–2017)
- Liv Hill (2000–) (actress)
- Gordon Hobday (1916–2015), Chancellor, Nottingham University, 1979–1992.
- Douglas Houghton, Baron Houghton of Sowerby (1898–1996), Labour MP from 1949 to 1974 for Sowerby
- Arthur Henry LeFebvre, (1923–2003), Distinguished Reilly Professor of Combustion Engineering
- Keith Matthewman QC, (1936–2008), Circuit Judge
- John Walters (broadcaster) (1939–2001)
- Jovon Makama (Professional Footballer) (2004-)
- Gareth Griffiths (Welsh Hockey Player) (1999-)
