= Dovecliffe railway station =

Disused railway station in South Yorkshire, England

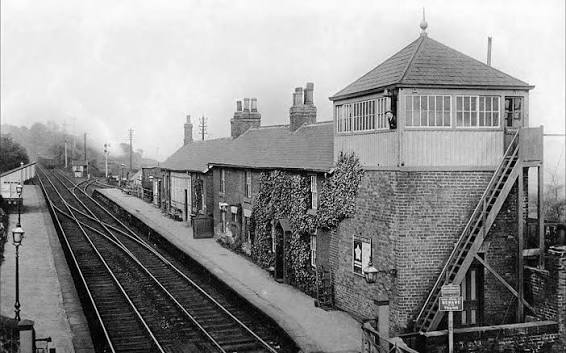
- Dovecliffe railway station and signal box in the early 1900s. On the Blackburn Valley Line looking in the direction of Birdwell.

General information
- Location: Station Road; Worsbrough, Barnsley; England
- Coordinates: 53.52482°N 1.44409°W
- Grid reference: SE369032

Other information
- Status: Disused

History
- Original company: South Yorkshire Railway
- Post-grouping: London and North Eastern Railway

Key dates
- 4 September 1854: opened
- 7 December 1953: closed
Location

Dovecliffe railway station was situated on the South Yorkshire Railway's Blackburn Valley line between High Royds and Wombwell Main Junction near Aldham.

== History ==
The Dovecliffe area of Worsbrough situated on the northern fringes of Wombwell Woods was named after its proximity on high ground less than a ¼ mile up from the River Dove and its valley.

Dovecliffe station opened with the line on 4 September 1854 and closed on 7 December 1953.

The Blackburn Valley Line was built predominantly through the southern Barnsley coalfields north of the steel making city of Sheffield. Most of the railway stations on the line were built near collieries in rather semi remote locations as opposed to villages, Dovecliffe Station being one.

The line through the station remained open until 1986 to allow freight access to Barrow Colliery, although the through line to Sheffield was severed between Birdwell and Westwood in the late 1960s with the construction of the M1 motorway.

The station was originally named Smithley for Darley Main & Worsborough but its name was changed by the end of 1855 to Darkcliffe and again in early 1860 to Dovecliffe. It was controlled by a signal box which sat on the station roof. When the line opened, as a single line, there was no block working and when a box was needed it was required to be placed on the outer side of a bend to give better visibility. With the station buildings being very close to the level crossing the only place where the box could be erected was on the station roof.

== Route ==
Preceding station	Disused railways	Following station
Wombwell Central	London and North Eastern Railway; South Yorkshire Railway	High Royds
