= Gordon Hobday =

British scientist (1916–2015)

Sir Gordon Ivan Hobday (1 February 1916 – 27 May 2015) was a British scientist who worked on penicillin with Alexander Fleming and is noted for his role as director of the Boots research team that developed ibuprofen. He later became chairman of Boots.

== Biography ==
Hobday was born in New Sawley, Derbyshire on 1 February 1916. His father, Alexander Thomas Hobday was a lace card punch operator and his mother was Frances Cassandra, née Meads. He attended Long Eaton Grammar School as a child and then studied Chemistry at University College, Nottingham. He continued his post graduate education at the university, under a scholarship and gained a PhD in 1940.

Hobday married Margaret Jean Joule on 5 October 1940 and they had one daughter together. In 1995, Margaret died and he remarried on 1 July 2002 to author Patricia Cooper, née Birge. He was the 4th Chancellor of the University of Nottingham, of which university he was a graduate. He was Lord Lieutenant of Nottinghamshire 1983–1991. He was made a Knight Bachelor in the 1979 Birthday Honours.

He died on 27 May 2015, in King's Mill Hospital, Sutton in Ashfield at the age of 99.

== Career ==
Hobday joined Boots & Co as a research assistant after completing his PhD in 1940 and worked his way up through promotions. In 1952, he became head of the research department when the previous head, Jack Drummond was murdered, and re-purposed the department to find treatments for "diseases of civilisation". It was under this mindset that the department looked for an alternative treatment for rheumatoid arthritis, due to the toxicity of aspirin. The programme came up with ibuprofen, which was patented in 1961. In the 1970s, it became an over-the-counter pain killer and the World Health Organization put it on its list of "essential medicines".

In 1968, Hobday was appointed the deputy managing director for Boots, and in 1970, he became the managing director. By 1973, he had become chairman, where he attempted a merger with Glaxo and to buy House of Fraser, but the Monopolies Commission stopped both.

Academic offices
Preceded by Sir Francis Hill	Chancellor of the University of Nottingham; 1978–1993	Succeeded by Ronald Dearing
Honorary titles
Preceded by Philip Francklin	Lord Lieutenant of Nottinghamshire; 1983–1991	Succeeded by Sir Andrew Buchanan, Bt
