= Ward Green =

Area of Worsbrough, South Yorkshire, England

Coordinates: 53.53692°N 1.48092°W

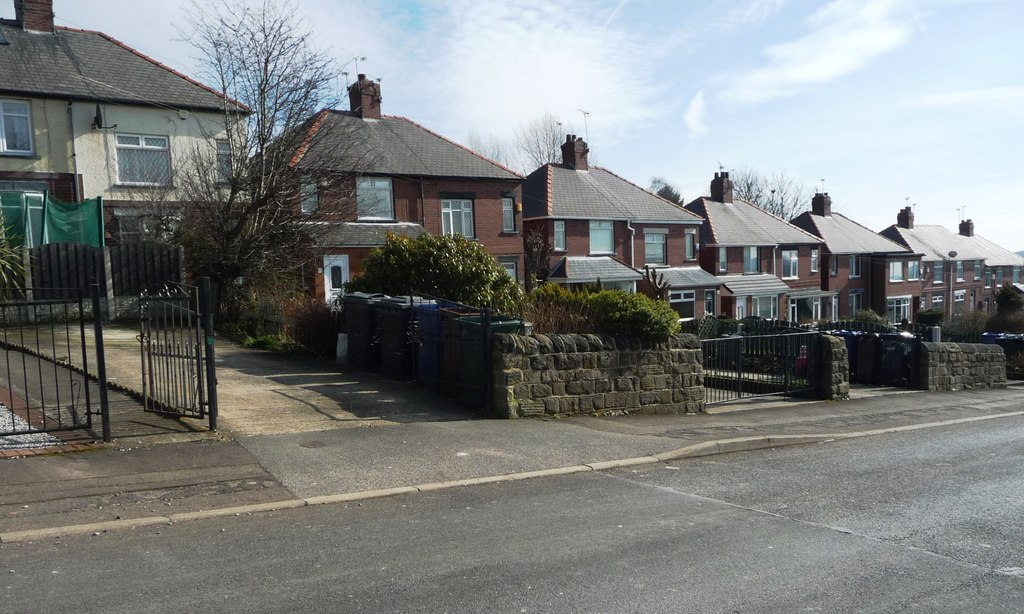
- Houses along Highstone Lane

- Location within South Yorkshire
- OS grid reference: SE 345 046
- Civil parish: Worsbrough Bridge
- Metropolitan borough: Barnsley
- Metropolitan county: South Yorkshire
- Region: Yorkshire and the Humber
- Country: England
- Sovereign state: United Kingdom
- Dialling code: 01226
- Police: South Yorkshire
- Fire: South Yorkshire
- Ambulance: Yorkshire

Ward Green is a part of Worsbrough, which itself is in the Metropolitan Borough of Barnsley, in the county of South Yorkshire, England.

Ward Green, was until 1974 part of the Worsbrough Urban District, in the West Riding of Yorkshire.
