= Paula Christine Hammond =

British magistrate and businessman

Paula Christine Hammond MBE JP
- Born: 13 March 1944; Long Eaton, Derbyshire, England
- Died: 25 March 2017 (aged 73); Nottingham, Nottinghamshire, England
- Occupation(s): Businesswoman and magistrate
- Known for: Services to the community of Nottinghamshire

Paula Christine Hammond (née Barsby; 13 March 1944 – 25 March 2017) was a British magistrate and businesswoman who was awarded an MBE in 2011 for services to the community of Nottinghamshire.

== Early life and education ==
Born on 13 March 1944 in Long Eaton, Derbyshire, Paula is the fourth daughter of Mabel (née Tarling) and Percy Barsby.

Hammond attended the Grange Primary School then the Long Eaton Grammar School (LEGS) from 1955 to 1961. She organised many reunions for LEGS.

== Work ==
Hammond's first job was selling broken biscuits at Woolworths. She later worked at the Ministry of Labour before starting the Paula Hammond Playschool which she ran for many years. She also worked in real estate.

== Magistrate ==
Hammond was a magistrate from 1974–2014. She was only 30 years old and received special dispensation to become a magistrate as the then minimum age was 35. She was Chairman of the Nottinghamshire Bench from 2008–2011.

Hammond served as a magistrate in Nottingham as well as in Ilkeston, Alfreton, Mansfield and Bingham.

Hammond was a frequent speaker on "Life as a Magistrate" and "Prison No Way Me". She recalls being called, "Duck", "Love", "Your Royal Highness" while serving on the bench.

== Awards ==
- Girl Guides, Queen's Guide
- MBE

== Community Involvement ==
- 4th Attenborough Brownies, Founder (1967) and Brown Owl (1967-2009).
- Attenborough Church, Sidesman
- Attenborough Church Social Committee, Chairwoman
- Attenborough Ladies Hockey Club, Founder
- Attenborough Lawn Tennis Club, President
- Attenborough Parochial Church Council (PCC), Committee member
- Cover Point Health Club, Founder
- Lucy and Vincent Brown Village Hall, Committee member
- Nottingham High School, Governor
- Soar Boating Club
- The Inner Wheel Club of Church Wilne, President
- Toton Brownies Assistant Leader (1959-1967)

== Governor ==
Hammond was appointed to two three-year terms as a Governor of Nottingham High School as a representative from the Nottingham Magistrates. She was then appointed for another thirteen years as an independent Governor. During her time, the school added Lovell House and started admitting girls.

== Trustee ==
Hammond was a trustee of

- Carter's Educational Foundation
- The Dorothy Lawson Memorial Bursary
- The Peveril Exhibition Endowment Fund

== Family ==
Hammond was married with 3 children, and 7 grandchildren.
