= Worsbrough Mill =

Historic mill in Worsbrough, England

Coordinates: 53.5254°N 1.4741°W

Worsbrough Mill, also known as Worsbrough Corn Mill and Worsbrough Mill Farm, is a complex of buildings including a seventeenth-century water-powered mill and a nineteenth-century steam-powered mill in Worsbrough, Barnsley, England. The mill is open to the public and takes its water from the River Dove, but is hydraulically separate from Worsbrough Reservoir.

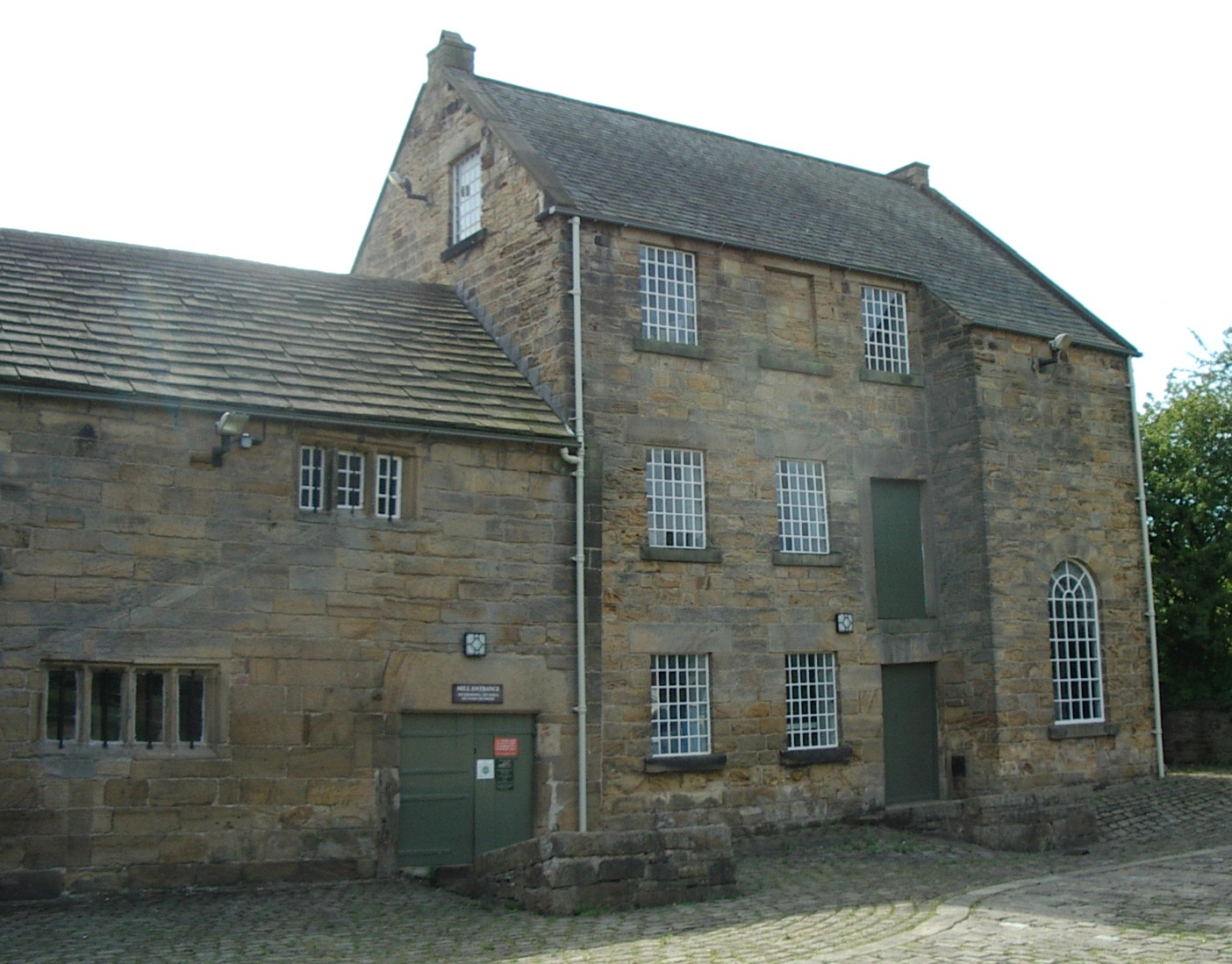
Worsbrough Mill in 2005

Note that "Worsbrough" refers to an area that includes today's Worsbrough Bridge, Worsbrough Dale, and Worsbrough Village etc.

== Worsbrough Mill Country Park ==
Worsbrough Mill is located in the 240-acre Worsbrough Country Park, just under 3 miles south of Barnsley on the A61, close to the M1 motorway. It includes the 60-acre Worsbrough Reservoir, which was built for the opening of the Dearne and Dove Canal in 1804.

The park includes footpaths and cyclepaths that meander through Willow Carr and around the circumference of the reservoir. Fishing is available in the upper pond and canal basin.

== History ==
A Worsbrough Mill was recorded in the Domesday Book of 1086 and the first Curator, [Rob Shorland-Ball – 1975 to 1979] researched the history and states that a "tenuous but continuous documentary record can be traced from then to 1625 which is the likely date for the building of the existing Old Mill. Whether the pre-1625 mill(s) were on the same site is not known. However, a mill was a very important part of the feudal pattern of life and settlement and thus tended to remain on the same site if that site was a satisfactory one".

== Buildings ==
The oldest building (the Old Mill) is a two-storey watermill with massive lintels over the doors; it is operational and mills a small amount of grain. There is some doubt over the date of construction; there are no dates on or in the buildings (with one exception) but 1625 has been stated (by Shorland-Ball) to be "acceptably representative".

The New Mill was originally steam-driven and contained a Watt-type beam engine which was scrapped in 1922. During the restoration of the mill buildings in the 1960s and early 1970s, a 1911 model Hornsby hot bulb oil engine originally from Sykehouse Windmill was installed by Geoff Hatfield (Millwright). The engine still functions, but is not linked to the millstones in the New Mill. The building is known to have been completed 1843 but was not present on a detailed map of 1840.

== See also ==
- Grade II* listed buildings in South Yorkshire
- Listed buildings in Worsbrough
