= Westwood railway station =

Disused railway station in South Yorkshire, England

Westwood
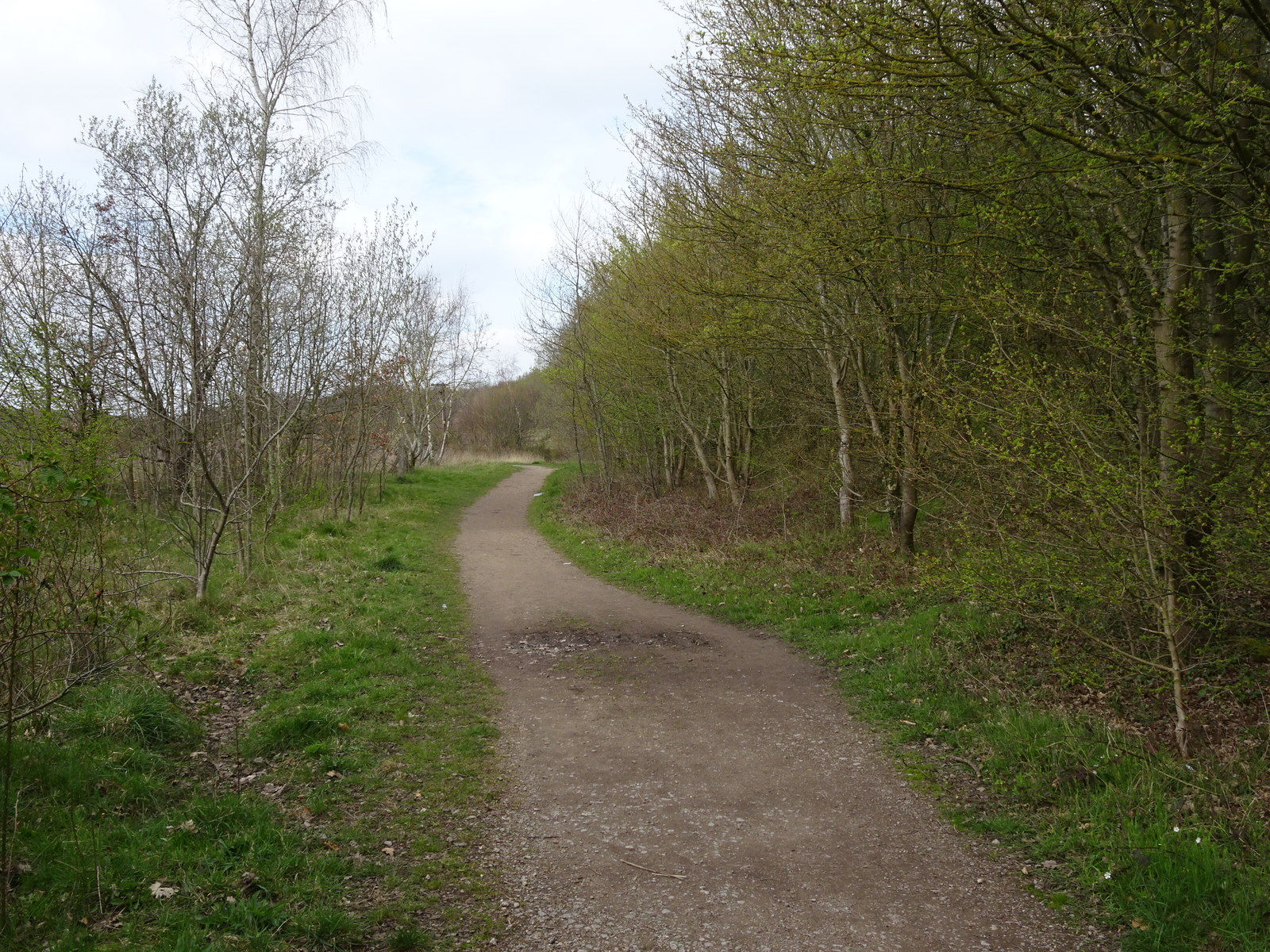
- Site of the former station (2019)

General information
- Location: Westwood, Barnsley, South Yorkshire; England
- Coordinates: 53.48258°N 1.48539°W
- Grid reference: SK342985
- Platforms: 2

Other information
- Status: Disused

History
- Original company: South Yorkshire Railway
- Post-grouping: London and North Eastern Railway

Key dates
- 4 September 1854: opened
- 28 October 1940: closed
Location

Westwood railway station was situated on the South Yorkshire Railway's Blackburn Valley line between Chapeltown Central and Birdwell & Hoyland Common. The station served an area of few houses apart from two rows of miners' cottages known as "Westwood Row". The nearest settlement was at High Green, just over 1.5 miles (2.4 km) away. Tankersley colliery was north of the station and was connected to the railway line by an industrial spur. Another spur left the line in Westwood station and led via a switchback to Thorncliffe Iron Works and Thorncliffe Colliery.

The original Westwood station, set in a wooded area, was opened on 4 September 1854 on a single line to the north of the level crossing. When the line was doubled in 1876 the station was staggered around the level crossing, reopening on 9 October of that year, with its main buildings, brick built and similar to other on the line, on the Sheffield-bound platform.

Westwood signal box, a tall M.S.& L.R. hipped-roof type, was on the Barnsley-bound side of the line. From 1876, when Absolute Block Working was introduced on the line, a second signal box was built to control the entry to Newbegin Colliery. Westwood signal box was closed in 1933 and replaced by a 6 lever ground frame to control the sidings and crossing gate locks. The control of its signals passed to Newbegin signal box.

Although passengers were sparse, the station was a second point for dealing with the traffic generated by Newton, Chambers & Company. That company's locomotive fleet used the line between here and Chapeltown in order to move between the two sites.

The station was closed on 28 October 1940. Heavily overgrown sections of the level crossing platform and buildings are still visible to the naked eye.

== Route ==
Preceding station	Disused railways	Following station
Birdwell & Hoyland Common	London and North Eastern Railway; South Yorkshire Railway	Chapeltown Central
