= Barrow Colliery =

Former coal mine in South Yorkshire, England

- Location within South Yorkshire

Location
- Location: Worsbrough, Barnsley, South Yorkshire, England; 53°31′12″N 1°27′35″W

Production
- Products: Coal; Coke
- Production: 5,000 tonnes (5,500 tons) per week
- Financial year: 1982–1983

History
- Opened: 1873 (coaling began in 1876)
- Closed: May 1985

Owner
- Company: Barrow Haematite Steel Company (1873–1932); Barrow Barnsley Main Collieries (1932–1947); National Coal Board (1947–1985)

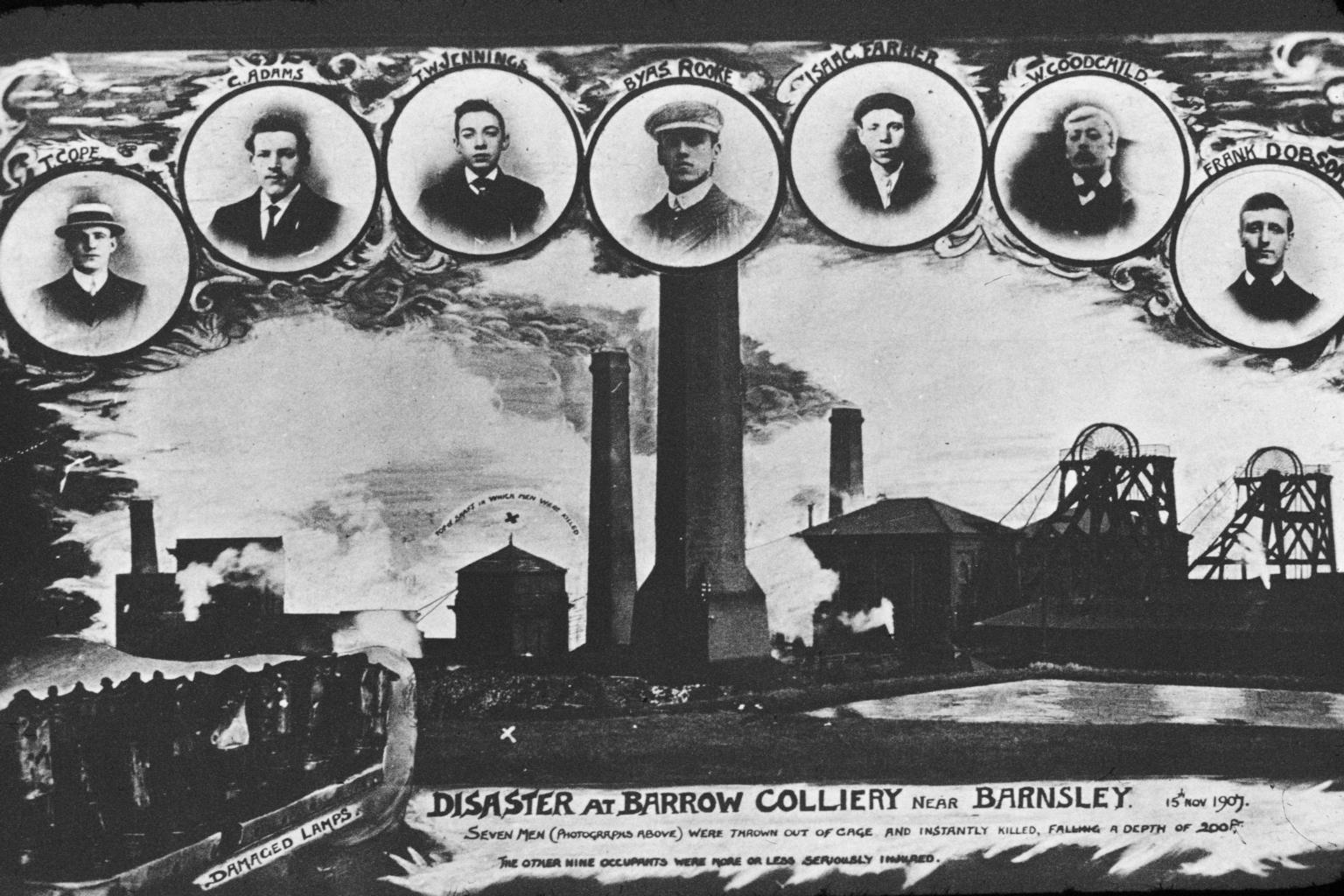
Poster honoring victims from the Barrow Colliery disaster

Barrow Colliery was a coal mine at Worsbrough Park, South Yorkshire, England. It was first dug in 1873, with the first coal being brought to the surface in January 1876. It was the scene of a major incident in 1907 when seven miners died. After 109 years of coaling operations, the mine was closed in May 1985.

== History ==
The mine was located in Blacker on the south side of Worsbrough, South Yorkshire, but was called Barrow Colliery after the owners who sunk the mine, The Barrow Haematite Steel Company, which had other coal mines in operation though mainly in the Cumbrian and Lancashire coalfields. The company had purchased land in 1872 next to a former mine, Worsbrough Park Colliery, that had been abandoned. Digging started in 1873, although coal was not won until 1876 after 18 months' worth of Digging. The company wanted access to good coal and coking coal reserves, as it consumed over 800,000 tonnes (880,000 tons) of it per year in its steelmaking enterprise. The mine operated for 109 years with a pause in production during the UK miners' strike.

The mine had three shafts; No. 1 was 15 feet (4.6 m) in diameter and 410 yards (370 m) deep which produced coal from the Parkgate and Thorncliffe seams. No. 2 shaft was 15 feet (4.6 m) in diameter and 469 yards (429 m) deep and No. 3 shaft was 17 feet (5.2 m) in diameter with a similar depth to No. 2 shaft. Both No. 2 and 3 shafts drove into the Silkstone seam. The sinking into the Silkstone Seam was the deepest underground of any of the mines in the Barnsley Coalfield; previous to this, the deepest had been at Swaithe Main Colliery at a depth of 240 yards (220 m).

Seven men died at the pit in November 1907. A cage in No. 3 shaft, with seventeen men inside it (12 in the upper deck, five in the lower) had been lowered to allow a miner to get off at the Thorncliffe stage. The two men in charge of the cage (called onsetters) rushed through their safety sequence and as a result, the cage was hauled up the shaft before it had been uncoupled from the shaft wall. The seven men fell over 70 feet (21 m) to immediate death at the bottom of the shaft. Whilst cage accidents were commonplace in mines, many coroner's inquests recorded accidental death as their outcomes; in the case of Barrow, two men who were operating the cage, were found guilty of "great carelessness and negligence, [but] not criminal negligence". The closed Worsbrough Park Colliery, which was adjacent to Barrow Colliery, suffered a similar accident in 1839 when four miners (three from the same family) were killed when the rope on the cage snapped and they fell 120 yards (110 m) to their deaths.

In 1932, the Barrow Haematite Steel Company merged with the Barnsley Main and Monk Bretton colliery companies to form the Barrow Barnsley Main Collieries Limited. This venture was nationalised in 1947 into the National Coal Board who remained its owners until it was closed in 1985. In 1982, the pit was recording an output of 1,000 tonnes (1,100 tons) per day, which equated to 5,000 tonnes (5,500 tons) per week and each miner producing an average of 18 tonnes (20 tons) per shift. Most of the output from Barrow was destined to be exported through the dock at Immingham Dock bound for Europe.

When the miners' strike ended in March 1985, Arthur Scargill led the miners back to the pithead at Barrow Colliery with a lone Scottish piper playing a lament. When they reached the gates of Barrow, a flying picket demonstration with miners from the Kent Coalfield, were still protesting, so the procession turned back. Scargill was later quoted as saying that "I've never crossed a picket line." Just two months later in May 1985, the pit was closed owing to geological problems. Subsidence from the mine had already caused a canal basin on the Worsbrough branch of the Dearne and Dove Canal to be re-inforced in the early part of the 20th century.

A local brass band that had started up in 1906 had its ranks swelled by members of the mining community from Barrow Colliery. The band was renamed the Barrow Colliery Brass Band, but sponsorship waned during the run down of the coal mining industry in the area. In the 1990s, the band was then sponsored by a local building society, then the local paper. It still survives as a self-funding collective.
