= Barnsley Academy =

Secondary school in Barnsley, South Yorkshire, England

Location
- Farm Road; Kendray; Barnsley, South Yorkshire, S70 3DL; England; 53.53119°N 1.45020°W

Information
- Type: Academy
- Motto: The best in everyone
- Established: 2006
- Founder: United Learning Trust
- Specialist: Science
- Department for Education URN: 131749 Tables
- Ofsted: Reports
- Principal: Stephen Pitcher
- Gender: Mixed
- Age: 11 to 16
- Website: http://www.barnsley-academy.org/

Barnsley Academy is a secondary school in Barnsley, South Yorkshire, England. The school opened in September 2006. The school is a Predecessor of the Elmhirst School.

The school has academy status, having joined United Learning when opened.

== Ofsted judgements ==
The school was inspected by Ofsted in 2020, with a judgement of Good. It was inspected again in January 2025; this was an ungraded inspection, meaning the outcome is whether or not the school "has taken effective action to maintain the standards identified at that previous inspection". The inspection found that "Barnsley Academy has taken effective action to maintain the standards identified at the previous inspection".
