= Church of St Mary, Worsbrough =

Church in Worsbrough, South Yorkshire, England

Church of St Mary
- Church of Saint Mary, Worsbrough
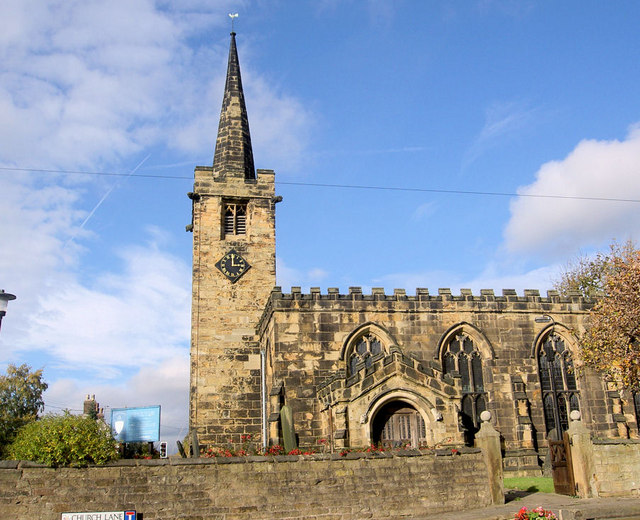
- St Mary's Church from the south
- Church of St Mary
- 53.519164°N 1.474104°W
- OS grid reference: SE 34967 02622
- Address: Worsbrough Village, Barnsley, South Yorkshire, S70 5EY
- Country: England
- Denomination: Church of England

History
- Status: Grade I listed building

Architecture
- Architectural type: Parish church
- Style: Norman, Perpendicular, and 19th-century Gothic Revival

Specifications
- Materials: Sandstone rubble and ashlar, stone slate roof

Administration
- Diocese: Diocese of Sheffield
- Parish: Worsbrough

The Church of St Mary is an active Church of England parish church located in Worsbrough Village, South Yorkshire, England. Dating from the 12th century, with substantial 15th- and 19th-century additions, the church was designated a Grade I listed building on 11 November 1966.

== History ==
=== Medieval origins and development ===
The church was established in the 12th century as a chapel of ease within the ancient parish of Darfield. Surviving 12th-century elements include masonry in the nave and chancel walls.

During the late 15th century, the building underwent significant reconstruction in the Perpendicular style. This work included the erection of the west tower, the addition of a south aisle, and the insertion of larger aisle and clerestory windows.

=== 19th-century alterations to present ===
In 1838, the church was restored and enlarged by architect John Whitacre Allen, who added a north aisle to accommodate a growing local population driven by industrial development in the Dearne Valley.

Further interior repairs and furnishings were completed in the late 19th and early 20th centuries. The church remains an active place of worship within the Deanery of Barnsley in the Diocese of Sheffield.

== Architecture ==
=== Exterior ===
The church is constructed of local sandstone ashlar and coursed rubble, with stone slate roofs. The plan consists of a three-bay nave with north and south aisles, a lower chancel, a south porch, and a two-stage west tower crowned by an octagonal spire.

The lower stages of the tower date to the 15th century and feature angle buttresses, a three-light Perpendicular west window, and carved gargoyles below the parapet.

=== Interior and fittings ===
The north arcade dates from the 1838 expansion, while the south arcade retains its 15th-century octagonal piers and double-chamfered arches.

The church contains a notable wooden memorial to Roger Rockley (died 1534), consisting of a double-decked oak monument featuring two carved effigies: the upper tier displays Rockley in full armor, while the lower tier depicts his corpse as a shroud-clad skeleton.

Additional interior fittings include a 15th-century stone font with an octagonal basin, medieval oak bench ends, and 17th-century wall tablets dedicated to members of the local Elmhirst family.

== Notable events ==
Seventy five miners who were killed in the 1849 Darley Main Colliery disaster in Worsbrough Dale lay buried in the churchyard in a mass grave.

== See also ==
- Grade I listed buildings in South Yorkshire
- Listed buildings in Worsbrough
