= Chapeltown, South Yorkshire =

Village in South Yorkshire, England

Coordinates: 53.462°N 1.466°W

Chapeltown
- Town
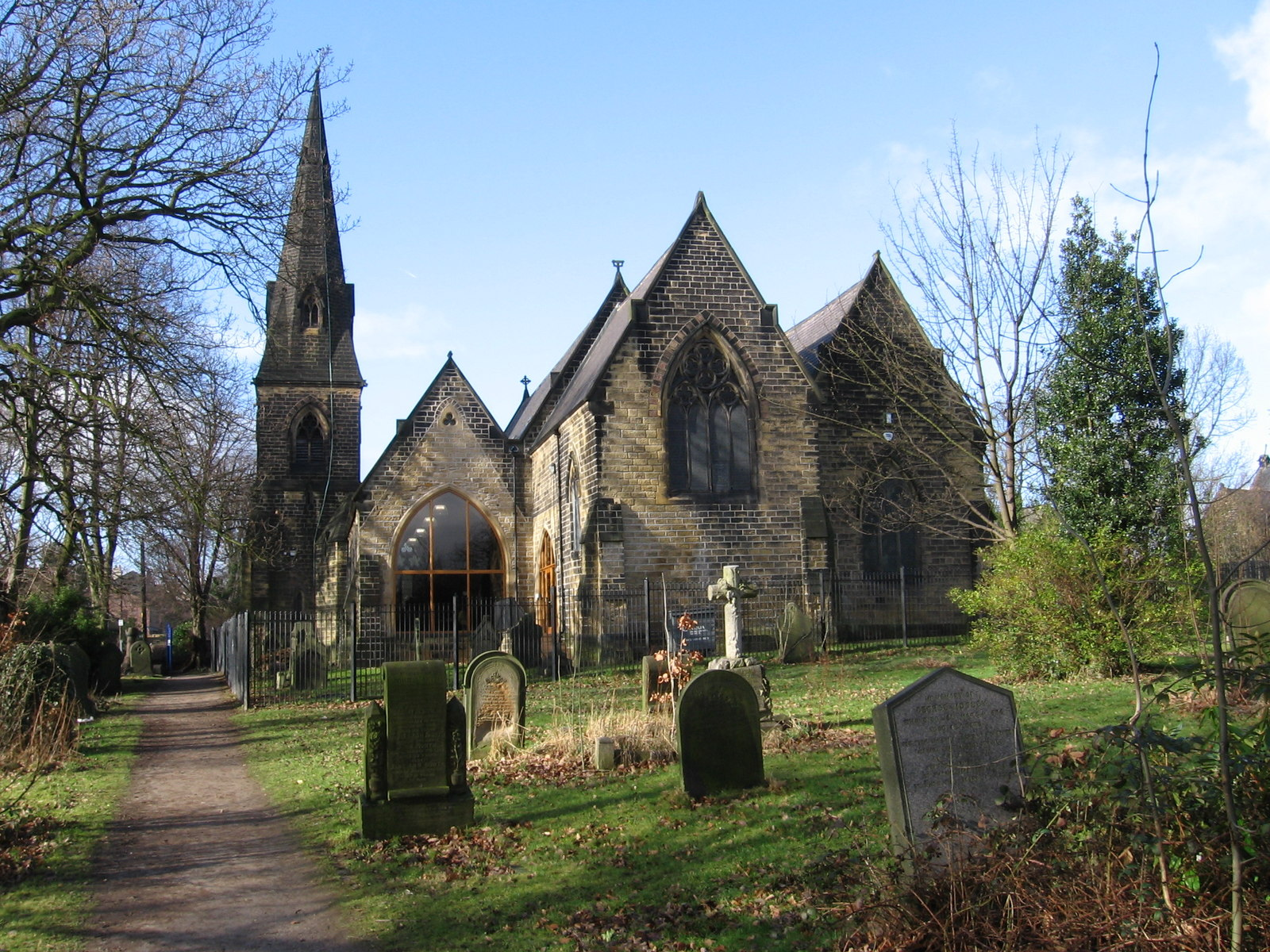
- St John's church

- Location within Sheffield
- Population: 10,043
- Civil parish: Ecclesfield
- Metropolitan borough: City of Sheffield
- Metropolitan county: South Yorkshire
- Region: Yorkshire and the Humber
- Country: England
- Sovereign state: United Kingdom
- Post town: SHEFFIELD
- Postcode district: S35
- Dialling code: 0114
- Police: South Yorkshire
- Fire: South Yorkshire
- Ambulance: Yorkshire
- UK Parliament: Penistone and Stocksbridge

Chapeltown is a small town in South Yorkshire, England. It lies half way between Barnsley and Sheffield approximately 7 miles from both. It is part of the civil parish of Ecclesfield. Chapeltown is historically within the West Riding of Yorkshire. Up until 1 April 1974, Chapeltown was part of the Wortley Rural District, after which, it was made part of the new administrative county of South Yorkshire and the Sheffield City Council area.

== Geography ==
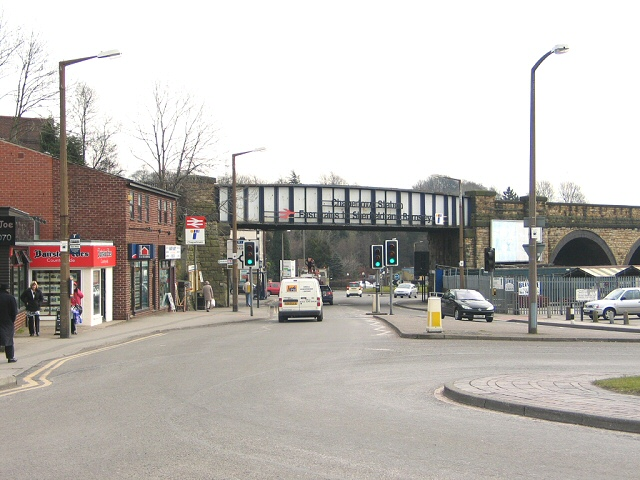
Railway bridge and road junction in the town centre

Chapeltown is located 7 miles (11 km) south of the centre of Barnsley and approximately 7 miles (11 km) north of the centre of the city of Sheffield, it lies on the railway between Barnsley and Sheffield. Chapeltown railway station is served by the Penistone Line and Hallam Line. Two junctions of the M1 motorway also serve the area. The A6135 road passes through the town from north to south and is joined near the town centre by the A629 road from the south-east and the B6546 road from the west.

Although near the M1 motorway, there is a large amount of greenspace in and around Chapeltown. The town centre has a cricket ground and a wooded park on either side of it. Between Chapeltown and Ecclesfield the land is used for residential purposes on one side of the main road and agricultural on the other. There is also a brownfield site above the park.

== History ==
Until industrial expansion, Chapeltown was a hamlet that originated at the intersection of the roads between Sheffield and Barnsley and between Rotherham and Wortley. In the late 16th century a blast furnace was installed there which initially used charcoal, and from 1780 was fired with coke. Chapeltown was part of the ecclesiastical parish of Ecclesfield and had a population of 4063 persons around 1870. Coal mining was one of the main occupations of the inhabitants.

The works of Newton, Chambers & Company were first established in Chapeltown in 1793. Initially they were an iron works specialising in cast iron products, but over time the company expanded into related mining industries and products from the fractional distillation of coal, including the Izal disinfectant range. In the Second World War they produced Churchill tanks. The company's site is now Thorncliffe Industrial Estate, where most of the industry in Chapeltown is located.

=== Green Belt Controversy ===
In 2025, Sheffield City Council released a shortlist of Green belt land that was to be released for development, which included Chapeltown as the location for 549 homes. After the announcement was made, the campaign group Save Chapeltown, Ecclesfield and Grenoside Greenbelt was formed and has accumulated over 5000 followers on facebook.

The council will receive a final report, which includes public responses, and are set to decide on the plan before the conclusion of the process in July.

== Bibliography ==
- Jones, J (1999). "An Illustrated History of Izal". In Jones, Melvyn (ed.). Aspects of Sheffield. Vol. 2. Sheffield: Wharncliffe Books. ISBN 978-1871647587.
