= Elsecar Ironworks =

Ironworks in Elsecar, South Yorkshire, England

Coordinates: 53°29′40″N 1°25′12″W

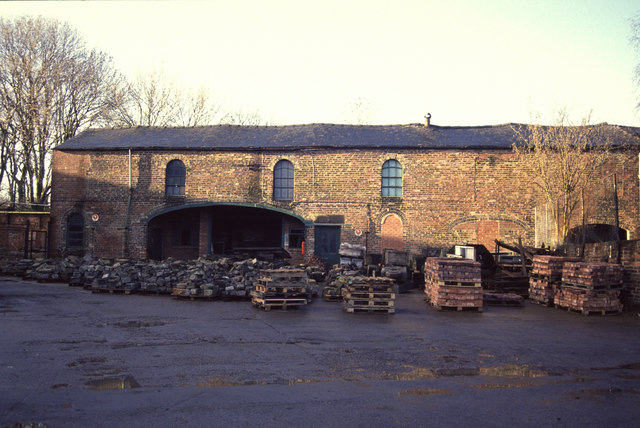
Elsecar Ironworks

The Elsecar Ironworks opened in 1795 in the village of Elsecar near Barnsley, South Yorkshire. The company was bankrupted in 1827 and taken over by the Wentworth estate who owned the land it stood on. The buildings are now part of the Elsecar Heritage Centre.

== History ==
Elsecar has been a mainly agricultural village situated on the Wentworth estate of Earl Fitzwilliam. There had been localised coal and iron mining on the edges of the village since the 14th century.

The Ironworks opened in 1795 on a site near the head of the Elsecar Branch of the Dearne and Dove Canal. The canal, opened to service the coal mines, was extended a short distance to a new basin nearer the ironworks. The works made pig iron from locally mined ores as well as a range of cast iron products, mostly for the construction trades.

A little further away, atop the hill to the west, was built the Milton Ironworks, working in the same market place as its rival. This was also connected to the canal basin, but this time by a tramway, believed to be at a gauge less than Standard Gauge, the rails being set on stone blocks.

Elsecar Ironworks went into bankruptcy in 1827, and as it was situated on lands leased from the Wentworth estate it was these who took them over.

From its opening in February 1850 the works and collieries were connected to the Elsecar Branch of the South Yorkshire Railway giving easy access to the wharves on the River Trent at Keadby. In due time this enabled the companies to obtain ironstone from the Scunthorpe fields, which were rediscovered in 1859.

== Today ==
The site of the ironworks is today part of the Elsecar Heritage Centre. The Elsecar Steam Railway operates from a station within the centre along part of the South Yorkshire Railway's Elsecar branch, towards Cortonwood.

Some of the buildings, which were the National Coal Board workshops still stand and contain ironwork made in Elsecar.

== See also ==
- Listed buildings in Hoyland Milton
