= Elsecar goods station =

Coordinates: 53.4955°N 1.4190°W

Elsecar goods station was a goods facility constructed near the village of Elsecar, near Barnsley, South Yorkshire, at the terminus of the South Yorkshire Railways branch line from Elsecar Junction on its Mexborough to Barnsley line. The total length of the line was 2 miles 1,204 yards (4.3 km).

The line from Elsecar Junction followed closely that of the Elsecar Branch of the Dearne and Dove Canal to its terminus at Elsecar where the sidings of Earl Fitzwillian's Elsecar Colliery are alongside. Also joining the line are the exchange sidings of Lidgett Colliery, reached by an incline from a triangular junction in the yard. The route of this tramway can still be seen today running between the hedgerows towards its summit and the point where it turns towards the colliery.

In 1930 the facilities in the yard included a goods shed with crane and sidings to the Elsecar Ironworks, the local gas works as well as the building containing Earl Fitzwilliam's private railway station and other warehouse facilities.

The facilities were closed in the early 1970s.
