= Elsecar railway station =

Railway station in South Yorkshire, England

Elsecar
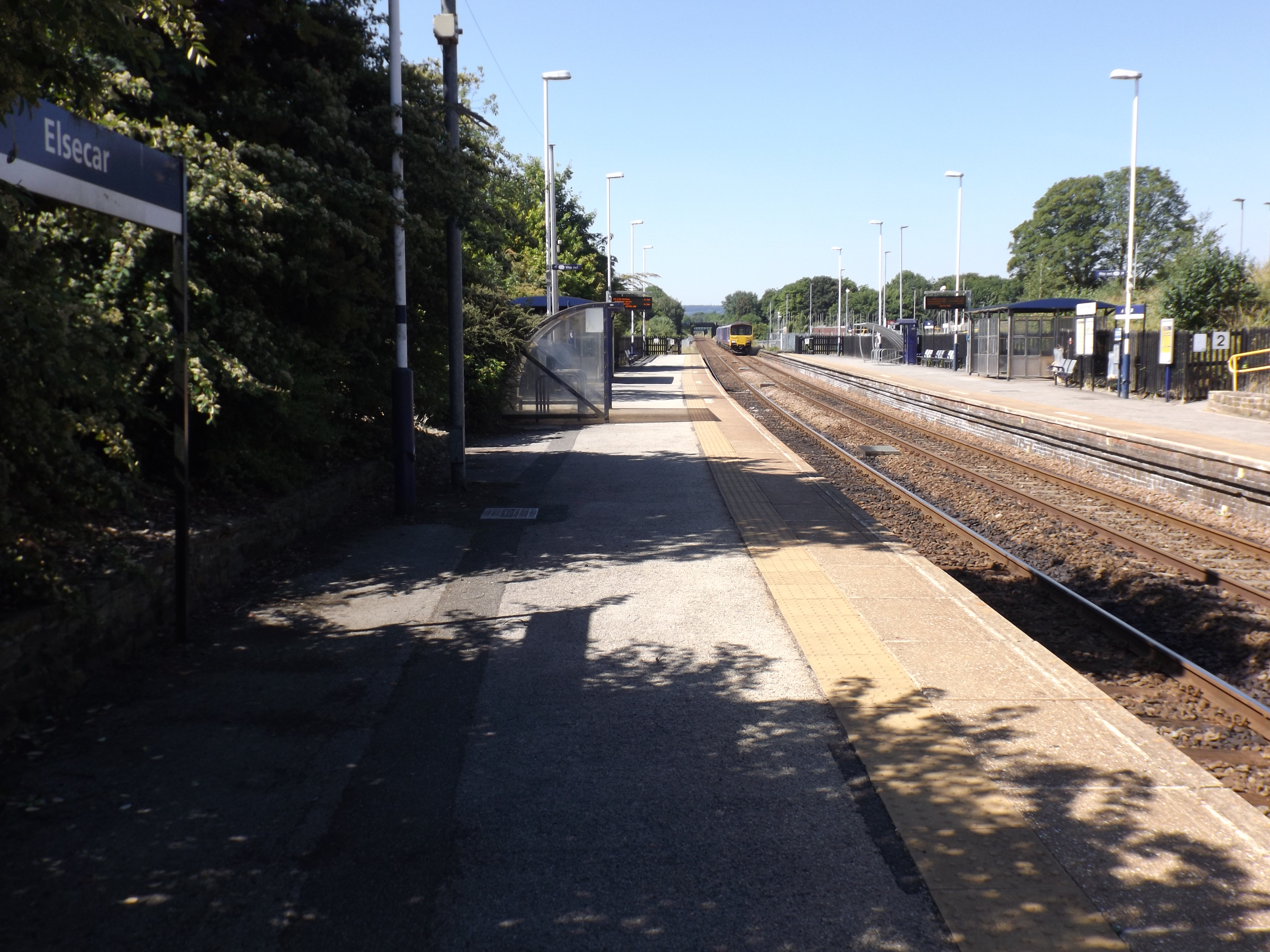
- Elsecar railway station 2018

General information
- Location: Elsecar, Barnsley; England
- Coordinates: 53.499°N 1.427°W
- Grid reference: SE381004
- Manager: Northern Trains
- Transit authority: Travel South Yorkshire
- Platforms: 2

Other information
- Station code: ELR
- Fare zone: Barnsley
- Classification: DfT category F1

History
- Opened: 1 July 1897; 129 years ago

Passengers
- 2020/21: ▼40,780
- 2021/22: ▲0.133 million
- 2022/23: ▲0.155 million
- 2023/24: ▲0.181 million
- 2024/25: ▲0.196 million
Location
Notes
- Passenger statistics from the Office of Rail and Road

Elsecar railway station is a railway station serving the village of Elsecar in South Yorkshire, England. It is on the Penistone Line and Hallam Line served by Northern Trains. The station was opened by the Midland Railway in July 1897 and was at one time known as Elsecar & Hoyland.

CCTV was recently installed for the purposes of crime prevention. Other improvements to the station include new signage, lighting, and the installation of passenger information display screens to provide real-time service information.

A new 85-bay car park at the station was opened in November 2013 – funded by South Yorkshire PTE, this cost £500,000 and is located behind the northbound platform.

== Facilities ==
Elsecar station is unstaffed and has no permanent buildings. Standard waiting shelters are provided on each side, along with a customer help point on platform 1. Train running information is offered via the display screens at the entrance to, and on the platforms and via timetable information posters. Step-free access is available to each platform via ramps, there are two ramps to the Northbound platform. There are bicycle storage facilities on both platforms.

Ticket machines were installed on each platform in 2018, however these are currently out of use as of May 2021 due to vandalism.

== Service ==
On weekdays and Saturdays by two trains per hour towards Sheffield and two trains per hour to Barnsley, one continuing to Leeds via Castleford and the other to Huddersfield via Penistone. The first northbound departure each day runs to Barnsley only, whilst the last northbound one terminates at Wakefield Kirkgate.

On Sundays, trains run every hour (approximately) to Sheffield and every two hours to Huddersfield and Leeds.

Preceding station	National Rail	Following station
Chapeltown	Northern Trains Hallam Line	Wombwell
Chapeltown	Northern Trains Penistone Line	Wombwell

== See also ==
- Elsecar Steam Railway
- Earl Fitzwilliam's private railway station
- Rockingham (South Yorkshire) railway station
