= South Yorkshire Coalfield =

Coalfield in Yorkshire, England

Coordinates: 53.482°N 1.294°W

The South Yorkshire Coalfield is so named from its position within Yorkshire. It covers most of South Yorkshire, West Yorkshire and a small part of North Yorkshire. The exposed coalfield crops out in the Pennine foothills and dips under Permian rocks in the east. Its most famous coal seam is the Barnsley Bed. Coal has been mined from shallow seams and outcrops since medieval times and possibly earlier.

== Geography and geology ==
The coalfield stretches from Halifax in the north west, to the north of Bradford and Leeds in the north east, Huddersfield and Sheffield in the west, and Doncaster in the east. The major towns of Wakefield, Barnsley and Rotherham are within its boundaries. It is part of the larger Nottinghamshire, Derbyshire and Yorkshire Coalfield. Its western boundary is defined by the outcropping of coal seams in the foothills of the Pennines and in the east by the descent of the coal-bearing strata under overlying rocks as they approach the North Sea. Since the creation of the county of South Yorkshire in 1974, the name can be misleading as the coalfield stretches beyond the Wakefield district and other parts of West Yorkshire as far as Keighley and Kellingley Colliery and the Selby Coalfield are in North Yorkshire. It is separate from the Ingleton Coalfield in North Yorkshire, and a small number of mines around Todmorden are part of the Lancashire Coalfield.

The coal bearing rock strata or coal measures that make up the coalfield outcrop in the foothills of the Pennines and dip gently downwards from west to east. This area is known as the exposed coalfield. The coal measures are Carboniferous rocks deposited between 290 and 354 million years ago. West and east of Doncaster the coal measures are overlain by younger rocks, Permian limestone, where the area is referred to as the concealed coal field.

The northernmost extent of the South Yorkshire Coalfield is marked by the change of its richest and highest grade coal seam, the Barnsley Seam or Bed, to a thin seam of inferior coal which occurs to the north of Barnsley. The southern limit was marked by the Barnsley Bed losing its coking qualities.

The structure of the coal field is not significantly affected by faults except along the River Don between Sheffield and Mexborough. These faults give rise to the Frickley and Maltby troughs where the coal measures are thrown down and lie deeper than in other parts of the coalfield.

== Coal type and seams ==
The coal found in the South Yorkshire Coalfield was a bituminous coal that was generally used for the production of coal gas and coke. The coke was then used for iron and steel manufacture. Some seams produced coal suitable for raising steam, i.e. it had a low ash and sulphur content. Finally other seams produced coal for household use.

The most famous seam in the South Yorkshire Coalfield was the Barnsley seam or bed. This seam which was up to 3 metres (9.8 ft) thick in places provided a significant amount of the coal produced by the coal field. The Barnsley seam coal properties varied through the depth of the seam. The top of the seam was a soft bright coal, the middle section known as the "hards" was a dull hard high quality coal suitable for raising steam. The bottoms was another band of bright soft coal called "bottom softs".

Other famous seams include the Parkgate seam that produced mainly gas coal, the Silkstone seam which produced coal suitable for many purposes and the Swallow Wood seam that produced household and gas coal.

== History of the development of the coalfield ==
=== Pre-19th century ===
There is evidence of coal mining in the field as far back Roman period. Documentary evidence of medieval mining around Barnsley, Rotherham and Sheffield dates back to the 14th century. An example of this is permission granted by Sir John Fitzwilliam in 1367 for mining to take place on his estate near Elsecar south of Barnsley. These mines were shallow shafts or adits that exploited the coal seams where they outcropped. The coal would have been used locally as a heating fuel or in the production of iron. This small scale mining persisted well into the late 1780s when the 4th Earl Fitzwilliam's colliery at Lawwood had only 19 "picks" or miners. The reason for the delay in development when compared to the coalfields of Northumberland and County Durham was that the area had poor access to water transport which was the only economic method of transport before the development of the railways.

The first area of the coalfield to gain access to improved transportation was the southern edge when the River Don Navigation was canalised as far as Tinsley near Sheffield by 1740. This allowed the collieries near Rotherham to export their coal east to the English coast and beyond and west Sheffield. By 1769 300,000 tons of coal were exported from the southern area of the coalfield. The colliery owners to the south in Derbyshire cut the Chesterfield Canal from Chesterfield to join with the River Trent near Gainsborough in 1777 which allowed them to compete directly with the South Yorkshire Coalfield. This in turn forced the colliery owners in Southern Yorkshire to improve their access to the sea. They planned a canal running from Wakefield south through Barnsley to the River Don at Swinton east of Rotherham. The canal called the Dearne & Dove Canal was started in 1793 and completed in 1796. The canal with branches to Elsecar and Worsborough allowed collieries through the coal field to be expanded. This can be seen with sinking of the Elsecar New Colliery by the 4th Earl Fitzwilliam.

=== The 19th century ===
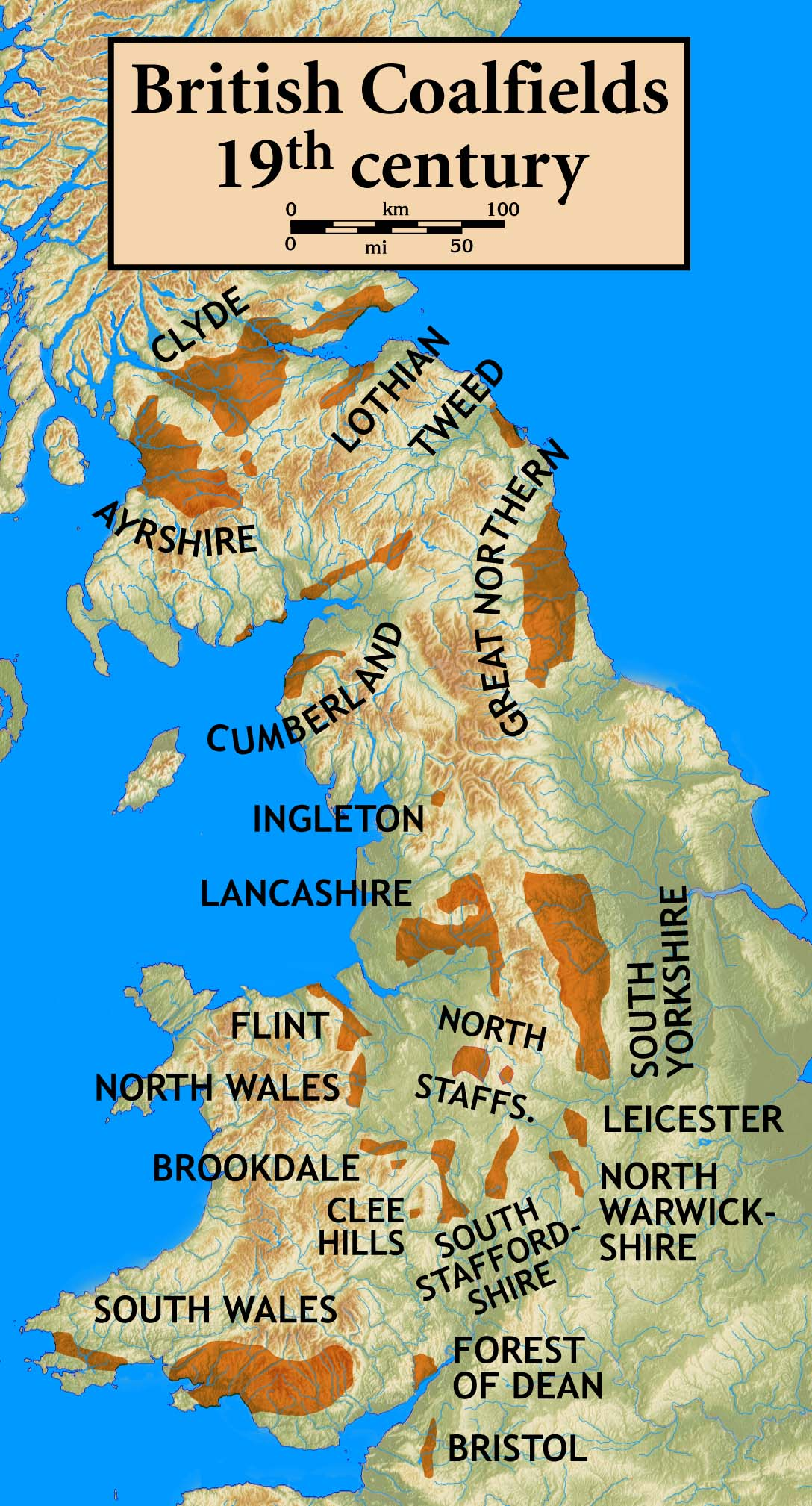

The coal trade in the early 19th century suffered several periods of recession but as the British railway system expanded during the 1840s & 1850s the market for coal increased markedly and transport of the coal using the railways improved distribution of the coal further boosting the trade. This increase in demand drove colliery owners to move further eastwards away from the shallow coal seams sinking deeper shafts as the Barnsley seam, which was their main target, dipped downwards.

During this period the coalfield suffered a series of fatal explosions as the available mine ventilation techniques were unable to safely deal with large quantity of methane or firedamp produced by the Barnsley seam in the deeper and larger mines being sunk. The contemporary colliery ventilation techniques were often poorly applied and even in collieries where the ventilation was well engineered the technique had a significant flaw. The flow of air was controlled by 'traps' or doors opened and closed by children when the tubs of coal passed. The children, being children, did not always close the doors when they should, resulting in explosives gases building up in the working parts of the colliery often with fatal consequences.

Some notable explosions are detailed further in the article.

The latter half of the 19th century was marked by further expansion eastwards. The opening of these collieries was possible as improved understanding of the geology of the coalfield allowed mining engineers to be more confident about the sinking collieries in previously un-mined parts of the coalfield. Improvements in drilling techniques allowed deeper bore holes to be sunk so the engineers had a better understanding of the coal deposits and this gave confidence to the speculators as to possible returns. The costs required in the deeper pits required more coal to guarantee a suitable return, therefore mines were set up in rural areas where large royalties could be negotiated with little in the way of buildings on the land to minimise the amount of coal that had to be left to prevent subsidence. The lack of population in these areas meant that the colliery owners had to provide accommodation in the form of pit villages and the quality of this varied considerably between collieries.

=== Early 20th century ===
At the turn of the 20th century many of the collieries on the exposed coalfield had exhausted the Barnsley seam in their royalty and rather than abandon their investment and experienced workforces many owners sank deeper shafts to exploit the seams that lay beneath the exhausted Barnsley seam such as the Parkgate and Swallow wood seams. Some examples of this include Cortonwood, Manvers Main, and Elsecar Main. At this time the first collieries on the concealed coalfield were opened such as Bentley & Brodsworth Main. These new collieries suffered many problems during the sinking of their shafts through wet sandstone and quicksand. It was during 1929 as these deeper pits sunk in the early years of the 20th century came into full production that the South Yorkshire Coalfield produced its record amount of coal 33.5 m tons, 13% of Britain's coal output that year.

The early part of the century was marked by increasing competition in foreign markets for the coal and as a result some mines were amalgamated to reduce costs and improve competitiveness. Outside the coalfield technology changes also reduced the size of markets as ships moved increasingly to oil as their primary fuel source, and train routes were electrified. Despite the amalgamations the industry was still seen as inefficient and to promote more efficient development of what was still a vital resource the Government in 1938 nationalised the coal reserves. During the Second World War, to ensure production levels were met, conscript labour redirected from the armed forces, the Bevin Boys, was used in the collieries.

=== Postwar ===
The British coal mining industry was nationalised in 1947. Whilst this was done, in the words of the Labour Party Constitution, "To secure for the workers by hand or by brain the full fruits of their industry and the most equitable distribution thereof that may be possible upon the basis of the common ownership of the means of production, distribution and exchange, and the best obtainable system of popular administration and control of each industry or service" as part of a wider process of nationalisation it did allow the coalfield to be modernised and streamlined in a way that had not been achieved in the previous decades. The National Coal Board management in the 40 years following nationalisation, closed inefficient and worked out collieries, amalgamated and combined other collieries to form larger production units where significant assets such as skip winders and coal washing and grading facilities could be used by several collieries and opened new drift mines which could be fitted with the latest equipment. The results of these actions carried out against a backdrop of a volatile and declining market was that by the time the collieries of South Yorkshire were sold to private owners in the mid nineties the coal they produced was some of the cheapest in the developed world.

=== Post-privatisation ===
Post privatisation pits continued to close as the market for coal in the United Kingdom contracted with the development of gas-fired power station in the Dash for Gas and the continued use of cheap coal imports in the electricity generating business. By January 2015 only two coal mines were still working, Kellingley and Hatfield Main, although some shafts remain in use as pumping stations to reduce pollution from the abandoned workings. On 18 December 2015, miners at Kellingley worked their final shift, marking the end of Great Britain's deep coal mining industry.

== Labour relations ==
There has been conflict between the mine owners and the miners for more than 200 years. A strike by miners in 1792 for higher wages at the Duke of Norfolk's collieries near Sheffield is an early example.

During the 19th century a variety of unions or associations such as the Mining Association of Great Britain & Ireland, the Miners National Union and the Miners Federation of Great Britain were formed to campaign for improved wages and better working conditions. They were largely unsuccessful. Two large scale strikes took place in 1844 and 1893. The strike in 1893 was the result of a 25% wage cut by the mine owners which was eventually restored but not before two miners were killed by soldiers at Featherstone.

The 20th century brought further strikes in 1912, 1921 and the General Strike in 1926. These all generally failed to bring about any improvement in pay and conditions.

Following nationalisation in 1947 working conditions improved but pay fell behind national averages. Successful strikes in the early 1970s resulted in wage improvements but as the market for UK coal declined and collieries closed, tension between the miners and the government increased and in 1984 a large scale strike started. The colliery closure that started the strike was at Cortonwood in South Yorkshire. The strike's aim to preserve miners' jobs was not met as colliery closures continued. (A small mine in Scissett, Hay Royds Colliery, was not nationalised. It closed in 2013.)

== Mining disasters ==
The South Yorkshire Coalfield has suffered some the worst mining disasters in Great Britain and the largest disaster in terms of fatalities in England. Some notable disasters either for their effect outside the region or scale:

- Huskar Pit Disaster: The pit flooded during a rainstorm in 1838 and 26 children were drowned. The disaster led to the 1842 commission on the employment of children and women in mines which resulted in banning female and child labour underground.
- Warren Vale Colliery: A firedamp explosion caused by naked flame in 1851 resulted in the death of 52 miners. At the inquest the coroner insisted on an increase in the number of mines inspectors in the district.
- Lower Elsecar Colliery: A firedamp explosion in 1852 resulted in the death of 12 miners. In response to the explosion, Benjamin Biram the collieries mining engineer fitted the first underground fan to improve ventilation.
- The Oaks explosion: A series of firedamp and coal dust explosions resulted in the death of 361 men and boys on 12 December 1866. It was the worst colliery disaster in the United Kingdom until the Senghenydd colliery disaster in South Wales in 1913 and is to date the worst in England.
- Lofthouse Colliery disaster in 1973: Water from the abandoned Low Laithes Colliery (near Ossett) broke through the coal face into Lofthouse Colliery, killing seven miners.

== See also ==
- Selby Coalfield

== Sources ==
- Clayton, A. K. (1962). "The Newcomen-Type Engine at Elsecar, West Riding". Transactions of the Newcomen Society. 35: 97–108. doi:10.1179/tns.1962.006.
- Hill, Alan (2001). The South Yorkshire Coalfield: A History and Development. Tempus. ISBN 0-7524-1747-9.
- Taylor, Warwick (2001). South Yorkshire Pits. Wharncliffe Books. ISBN 9781871647846.
- British Geological Survey (1972) [1947]. Geology of the Country Around Barnsley. HMSO. ISBN 0-11-880583-5.
