= Earl Fitzwilliam's private railway station =

Railway station in Barnsley, England

Earl Fitzwilliam (private)

General information
- Location: Elsecar, Barnsley; England
- Coordinates: 53.49417°N 1.41950°W
- Grid reference: SK386998

Other information
- Status: Disused

Key dates
- Opened: 1870
- Closed: ?
Location

Earl Fitzwilliam's private railway station is a former private railway station in South Yorkshire, England, situated at the upper end of the Elsecar branch of the South Yorkshire Railway.

The station was opened in 1870, after the line passed to the Manchester, Sheffield and Lincolnshire Railway and was used by the Earl's parties visiting the St. Leger race meeting at Doncaster. The Earl's parties were conveyed by coach from Wentworth Woodhouse to the station to join these trains which were known, and shown in railway publications as "E.F.W. Specials". Works records of Elsecar show that these trains ran until 'the early years of the 20th century'. The M.S.& L.R. issued a 'Royal Standard' to the station to be flown when royalty was included in the party.

The station was also host to other trains not connected to the St. Leger race meeting or usage by Earl Fitzwilliam. These were the seaside excursions operated for the pleasure of the villagers which were a regular feature of the summers before the First World War. Because of the length of journey and the suitability of the junction, meeting the main line in that direction, Cleethorpes was a popular destination.

The building was of two storeys, the upper storey containing a waiting/drawing room where the Earl entertained his guests prior to departure. Still standing, the station is included within the site of the Elsecar Heritage Centre. The first mile of the line, northwards from the Heritage Centre toward Cortonwood, has been re-laid after it was closed in 1983 with the closure of Elsecar Main Colliery and is now operated by the Elsecar Steam Railway. The remainder of the line, from Cortonwood to Elsecar Junction near Brampton, was closed after the closure of Cortonwood colliery in 1985, and the track lifted.

== Sources ==
"Earl Fitzwilliam's Private Railway Station" by D. L. Franks. "Forward", The journal of the Great Central Railway Society. ISSN 0141-4488
