= Milton Ironworks =

19th-century English iron works

Coordinates: 53°29′50″N 1°26′03″W

The Milton Ironworks was an iron works established in the 19th century in the Elsecar area of Barnsley, West Yorkshire, England.

== History ==
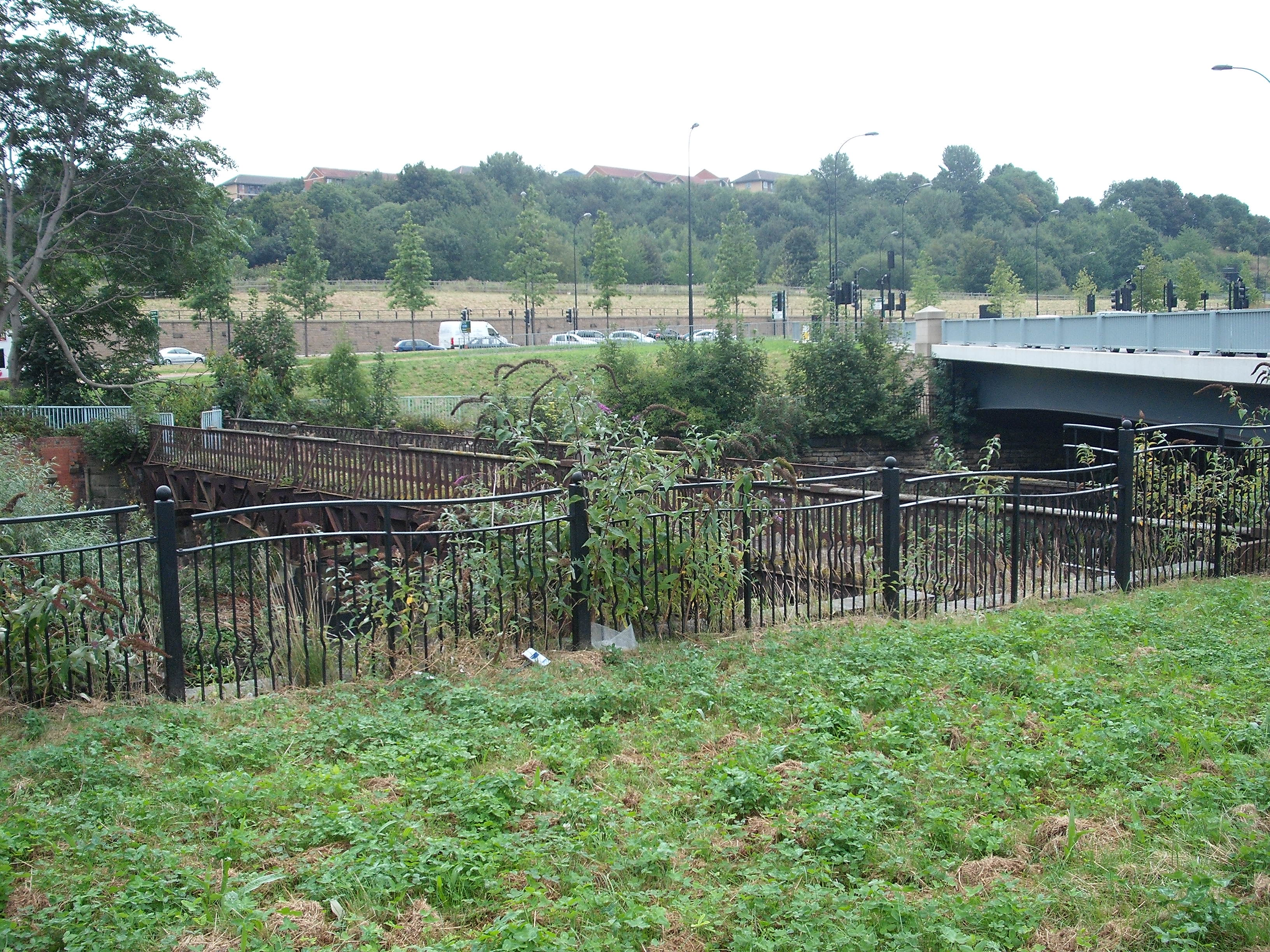
This iron footbridge was made at Milton Ironworks.

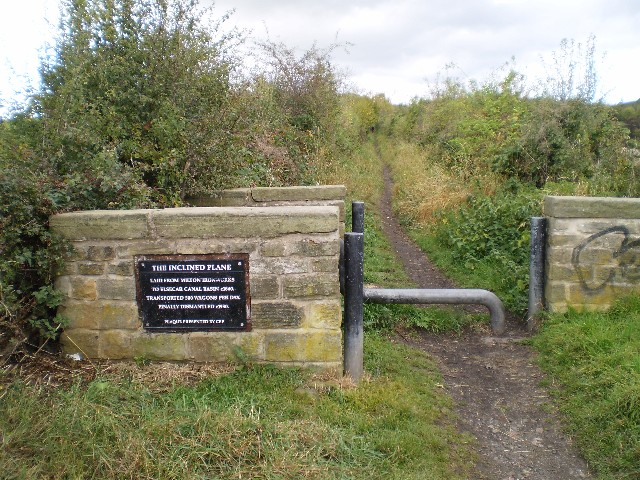
On the routhe of the former tramroad connecting the ironworks with the canal

Elsecar, near Barnsley, South Yorkshire, England was, until the 18th century, a mainly agricultural village on the estate of Earl Fitzwilliam. Coal and Iron had been worked from small pits around the village since the late 14th century, particularly in Tankersley Park.

The Milton Ironworks was situated atop a hill to the west of the Dearne and Dove Canal and in order to make use of these facilities it was connected by a tramroad, believed to have been laid to a gauge less than Standard Gauge, the rails being laid on stone sleeper blocks. This tramroad dates from around 1840 The main part of the tramroad system was relaid to standard gauge in the late 1850s and this enabled wagons from the main line company to reach the Milton works and mines in Tankersley Park.

The leaseholders of the land were W.H. and George Dawes, the celebrated Dawes Brothers, their name also being linked to the iron and steel industry in the Scunthorpe area, opening that areas first ironworks, the Trent Ironworks, in 1860.

The iron trade went into a slump in the early 1880s and the Milton Ironworks closed in 1884.

== Present day ==
The most obvious clue to the site of the works is the local pub, named "The Furnace". Looking out from the pub there is a large area of flat land, now a playing field, which was covered by the works. The tramways to the canal basin can easily be traced, both on the ground and from aerial photographs and maps. Most of these are, nowadays, footpaths and bridleways and the route to the canal basin lies between long establish hedgerows. It is more difficult to trace the tramways to Tankersley Park or the Thornecliffe works, which became the centre of the Newton, Chambers empire, but not impossible.

== See also ==
- Elsecar Heritage Centre
- Elsecar Steam Railway
