= Rockingham station =

Rockingham station may refer to:

- Rockingham bus station, in Perth, Australia
- Rockingham railway station (Leicestershire), in England
- Rockingham railway station, Perth, in Australia
- Rockingham station (Nova Scotia), in Canada
- Rockingham railway station (South Yorkshire), in England
