= Rockingham railway station (South Yorkshire) =

Railway line in South Yorkshire, England

Rockingham (South Yorkshire) Elsecar & Wentworth
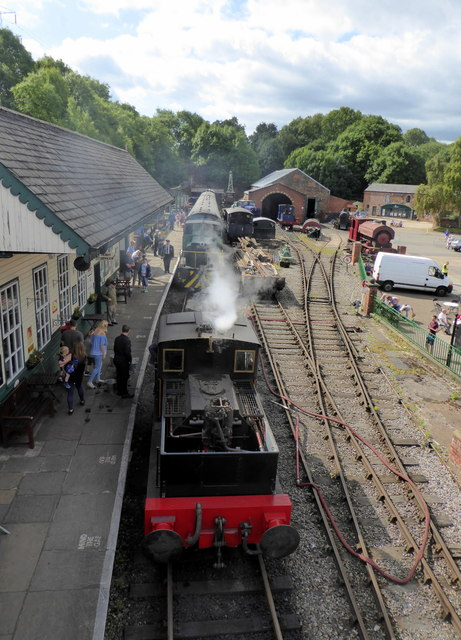

General information
- Location: England
- Coordinates: 53.49385°N 1.41906°W
- System: Station on heritage railway
- Operator: Elsecar Steam Railway; The Coalfield Line
- Platforms: 1

History
- Opened: 5 April 1996
- Original company: South Yorkshire Railway
Location

Rockingham (South Yorkshire) railway station is the terminus of the preserved line which is being built along the trackbed of the former Elsecar branch of the South Yorkshire Railway. The station is built within the Elsecar Heritage Centre, the former National Coal Board workshops at Elsecar. The station officially opened to passengers on 5 April 1996, when the inaugural train ran to Hemingfield.

The line runs from Rockingham station to Hemingfield Basin, alongside the Elsecar Branch of the Dearne and Dove Canal but it was intended to extend the line to Cortonwood with halts at Hemingfield and Cortonwood during 2013. However, by February 2017 the project was ongoing but still incomplete.

The station was called Rockingham by Barnsley Council (who re-opened the railway) after a second name of the Earl Fitzwilliam family, the original builders of the line in the 1850s.

== See also ==
- Elsecar Heritage Centre
- Elsecar Steam Railway
- South Yorkshire Railway
