= 1934–35 Aston Villa F.C. season =

English football club season

Aston Villa
1934–35 season
- President: Patrick Hannon
- Manager: Jimmy McMullan
- Stadium: Villa Park
- First Division: 13th
- FA Cup: Third round

Second City Derby
- 20--12--15

The 1934–35 English football season was Aston Villa's 43rd season in The Football League, Villa playing in the First Division. This was manager Jimmy McMullan's first season having been appointed as manager when Billy Smith retired at the end of the previous season.

The new year saw Aston Villa draw 1–1 away to Derby County, Eric Houghton scoring Villa's goal, leaving the club in 12th position.

In the Second City derby Villa lost away and could only manage a draw at home.

There were debuts for George Beeson, Jimmy Allen, Fred Butcher, Jimmy McLuckie and Frank Broome.

== League table ==
Pos	Team	Pld	W	D	L	GF	GA	GAv	Pts
11	Preston North End	42	15	12	15	62	67	0.925	42
12	Chelsea	42	16	9	17	73	82	0.890	41
13	Aston Villa	42	14	13	15	74	88	0.841	41
14	Portsmouth	42	15	10	17	71	72	0.986	40
15	Blackburn Rovers	42	14	11	17	66	78	0.846	39

Source: World Football
Rules for classification: 1) Points; 2) Goal average; 3) Goals scored

=== Matches ===
25 August 1934	Birmingham	2–1	Aston Villa	St Andrew's
		Report	Pongo Waring 87'
Note:

27 August 1934	Aston Villa	2–1	Wolverhampton Wanderers	Villa Park
	Dai Astley 40', Ronnie Dix 46'

1 September 1934	Aston Villa	3–2	Derby County	Villa Park
	Eric Houghton 25', Pongo Waring 82', 85'

3 September 1934	Wolverhampton Wanderers	5–2	Aston Villa	Molineux
			Ronnie Dix 42', Eric Houghton 61'

8 September 1934	Leicester City	5–0	Aston Villa	Filbert Street
			—

15 September 1934	Aston Villa	1–1	Sunderland	Villa Park
	Dai Astley 20'

22 September 1934	Aston Villa	2–0	Tottenham Hotspur	White Hart Lane
	Pongo Waring 15', Eric Houghton 75'

29 September 1934	Aston Villa	4–2	Preston North End	Villa Park
	Dai Astley 25', 46', 81', Pongo Waring 87'

6 October 1934	Grimsby Town	5–1	Aston Villa	Blundell Park
			Dai Astley 10'

13 October 1934	Aston Villa	2–2	Everton	Villa Park
	Dai Astley 28', Pongo Waring 60'

20 October 1934	Stoke City	4–1	Aston Villa	Victoria Ground
			Pongo Waring 68'

27 October 1934	Aston Villa	4–2	Manchester City	Villa Park
	Dai Astley 26', Pongo Waring 30', 40', Eric Houghton 31'

3 November 1934	West Bromwich Albion	2–2	Aston Villa	The Hawthorns
			Own goal 11', Eric Houghton 90'

10 November 1934	Aston Villa	4–0	Sheffield Wednesday	Villa Park
	Pongo Waring 1', 15', Dai Astley 48'

17 November 1934	Arsenal	1–2	Aston Villa	Highbury
			Eric Houghton 50', Bob Brocklebank 58'

26 November 1934	Aston Villa	5–4	Portsmouth	Villa Park
	Reg Chester 2', 64', Eric Houghton (pen), Bob Brocklebank

1 December 1934	Liverpool	3–1	Aston Villa	Anfield
			Pongo Waring 21'

8 December 1934	Aston Villa	1–1	Leeds United	Villa Park
	Own goal 40'

15 December 1934	Middlesbrough	4–1	Aston Villa	Ayresome Park
			Dai Astley 88'

22 December 1934	Aston Villa	1–1	Blackburn Rovers	Villa Park
	Pongo Waring 52'

25 December 1934	Chelsea	2–0	Aston Villa	Stamford Bridge
			—

26 December 1934	Aston Villa	0–3	Chelsea	Villa Park
	—

29 December 1934	Aston Villa	2–2	Birmingham	Villa Park
	Dai Astley 35', Pongo Waring 60'

5 January 1935	Derby County	1–1	Aston Villa	Baseball Ground
			Eric Houghton 15'

19 January 1935	Aston Villa	5–0	Leicester City	Villa Park
	Dai Astley 16', 52', 56', Arthur Cunliffe 36', Joe Beresford 40'

2 February 1935	Aston Villa	1–0	Tottenham Hotspur	Villa Park
	Ronnie Dix 48'

6 February 1935	Sunderland	3–3	Aston Villa	Roker Park
			Arthur Cunliffe 4', Joe Beresford 43', Ronnie Dix 65'

9 February 1935	Preston North End	0–0	Aston Villa	Deepdale
			—

16 February 1935	Aston Villa	3–2	Grimsby Town	Villa Park
	Eric Houghton 22', Billy Kingdon 26', Dai Astley 38'

23 February 1935	Everton	2–2	Aston Villa	Goodison Park
			Dai Astley 44', 52'

2 March 1935	Aston Villa	4–1	Stoke City	Villa Park
	Ronnie Dix 39', Dai Astley 48', 70', 76'

9 March 1935	Manchester City	4–1	Aston Villa	Maine Road
			Eric Houghton 22'

23 March 1935	Sheffield Wednesday	2–1	Aston Villa	Hillsborough
			Arthur Cunliffe 1'

30 March 1935	Aston Villa	1–3	Arsenal	Villa Park
	Eric Houghton 57'

3 April 1935	Aston Villa	2–3	West Bromwich Albion	Villa Park
	Ronnie Dix 30', Archie Watkins

6 April 1935	Portsmouth	0–1	Aston Villa	Fratton Park
			Archie Watkins 52'

13 April 1935	Aston Villa	4–2	Liverpool	Villa Park
	Arthur Cunliffe 12', Archie Watkins 30', Frank Broome 79', 85'

19 April 1935	Aston Villa	1–1	Huddersfield Town	Villa Park
	Archie Watkins 44'

20 April 1935	Leeds United	1–1	Aston Villa	Elland Road
			Billy Kingdon 43'

24 April 1935	Huddersfield Town	1–1	Aston Villa	Leeds Road
			Frank Broome 82'

27 April 1935	Aston Villa	0–3	Middlesbrough	Villa Park
	—

4 May 1935	Blackburn Rovers	5–0	Aston Villa	Ewood Park
			—
Note:

Source: avfchistory.co.uk

== Squad statistics ==
=== Appearances ===
- Harry Morton, 43 appearances
- Eric Houghton, 42 appearances
- George Beeson, 41 appearances
- Danny Blair, 38 appearances
- Billy Kingdon, 36 appearances
- Jimmy Allen, 34 appearances
- Dai Astley, 33 appearances
- Tommy Gardner, 32 appearances
- Arthur Cunliffe, 26 appearances
- Pongo Waring, 25 appearances
- Ronnie Dix 24 appearances
- Joe Beresford, 23 appearances
- Jimmy Gibson, 12 appearances
- Bob Brocklebank, 12 appearances
- Archie Watkins, 11 appearances
- Alec Talbot, 10 appearances
- Reg Chester, 10 appearances
- Frank Broome, 7 appearances
- Tommy Mort, 5 appearances
- Billy Simpson, 3 appearances
- Fred Butcher, 2 appearances
- Jimmy McLuckie, 1 appearance
- George Brown, 1 appearance
- Tommy Wood, 1 appearance
- Ernie Callaghan, 1 appearance

== See also ==
- List of Aston Villa F.C. records and statistics
