= Listed buildings in Hoyland Milton =

Hoyland Milton is a ward in the metropolitan borough of Barnsley, South Yorkshire, England. The ward contains 35 listed buildings that are recorded in the National Heritage List for England. Of these, eleven are listed at Grade II*, the middle of the three grades, and the others are at Grade II, the lowest grade. The ward contains the villages of Elsecar and Hemingfield and the surrounding area. Elsecar is located beside former industrial enterprises, including collieries and the Elsecar Ironworks. A high proportion of the listed buildings are associated with the ironworks, which have since been used for other purposes, some of the buildings forming the basis for the Elsecar Heritage Centre. The Elsecar branch of the Dearne and Dove Canal, now disused, passes through the ward, and two structures associated with it are listed, a canal basin and a bridge. The other listed buildings in the village include houses and cottages, a church, a school, a market hall later used as an assembly hall, and a former flour mill. Associated with the collieries are a former pumping engine house, and the entrance to a coal mine. Outside the village are listed farmhouses and farm buildings.

== Key ==
Grade	Criteria
II*	Particularly important buildings of more than special interest
II	Buildings of national importance and special interest

== Buildings ==
Name and location	Photograph	Date	Notes	Grade
Barn, Alderthwaite Farm; 53.49173°N 1.43808°W	—	Late 15th to 16th century	The barn is timber framed, an aisle was added later, in the 17th–18th century it was encased in sandstone, and it has an asbestos sheet roof. There is a single storey, 2½ bays, and a single aisle on the east. The barn contains double doors, slit vents, and a casement window.	II
Woodhouse Farmhouse; 53.50090°N 1.44117°W	—	17th century	The farmhouse, which has been altered and used for other purposes, is in sandstone, partly roughcast, and has a Welsh slate roof with chamfered gable copings, kneelers, and finials. There are two storeys, and an L-shaped plan, with a front of two bays, the left bay gabled and projecting to the rear. The doorway has a quoined surround and a deep lintel. Most of the windows are casements.	II
Cowhouse and hayloft, Alderthwaite Farm; 53.49157°N 1.43845°W	—	Early 18th century	The building is in sandstone with quoins, a Welsh slate roof, and stone slate eaves courses. There are two storeys and three bays. The entrance front is gabled, and contains a ground floor doorway with a deep stone lintel, a doorway in the upper floor with a timber lintel, approached by external stone steps, and there are also casement windows. In the side walls are slit vents, and the left wall contains a pitching hole.	II
9 and 10 Market Place, Elscar; 53.49477°N 1.42147°W		Mid 18th century	A pair of cottages in sandstone, with quoins, and a Welsh slate roof. There are two storeys, four bays, and each cottage has a rear wing. The doorways are in the centres of the cottages, and all the openings have large plain lintels.	II
1–15 Old Row, Elscar, and walls 53.49617°N 1.41982°W		Late 18th century	A terrace of sandstone cottages arranged in pairs, with Welsh slate roofs. There are two storeys and each cottage has one bay. The doorways have lintels grooved to imitate voussoirs, and the windows are replacement casements. Attached to the fronts of the cottages are garden walls with domed copings.	II
Barn and cowhouse, Lundhill Farm; 53.50852°N 1.39986°W	—	Late 18th century	The barn and cowshed are in sandstone, with a Welsh slate roof, and stone slate to the eaves, and they are mainly in two storeys. The barn has quoins and a gable with copings and moulded kneelers. It contains two large arched cart entries with quoined surrounds and keystones, a doorway, and a pitching hole. The cowshed to the right has six doors, two with round-arched lintels, and external steps leading to the hayloft, that has square openings and a circular pitching hole.	II
Farm building, Lundhill Farm; 53.50878°N 1.39956°W	—	Late 18th century	The farm building contains a cartshed and a dovecote, and later a pigsty. It is in sandstone on a plinth, with quoins, a moulded sill band between the top floors, a moulded eaves cornice, and a stone slate roof with coped gables and kneelers. There are three storeys and three bays. In the ground floor are three archways with piers, impost bands, and keystones. The upper floors contain mullioned windows with lintels grooved to resemble voussoirs.	II
Wood Head Hall Farmhouse; 53.51369°N 1.44043°W	—	Late 18th century	The farmhouse is in sandstone on a plinth, with quoins, a sill band, a moulded eaves cornice, and a stone slate roof with moulded gable copings and moulded kneelers. There are two storeys and an attic, and a symmetrical front of five bays. The central doorway is set in a round-arched recess, and has an architrave, a plain frieze, and a pediment on consoles. The windows are sashes, the window above the doorway with an architrave, a pulvinated frieze, and a cornice.	II
Elsecar Footrill; 53.49227°N 1.42116°W		c. 1795	The footrill, or pedestrian entrance to a mine, has retaining and wing walls in sandstone. The doorway has a quoined surround and a deep lintel, and it contains a square-latticed iron door leading to a vaulted tunnel. Above the entrance is an inscribed iron plaque.	II
Station Row; 53.49616°N 1.41888°W		1796	A terrace of ten cottages designed by John Carr, in sandstone with Welsh slate roofs. Each cottage has a single bay, and they form a symmetrical row, the middle two cottages and the two at each end with three storeys and hipped roofs, and the linking cottages between with two storeys.	II
12–15 Skiers Hall Cottages, Elscar; 53.49210°N 1.43023°W	—	1797–98	A row of four cottages designed by John Carr, in sandstone, with hipped sandstone slate roofs, and two storeys. The central pair of cottages are semi-detached, and linked to the outer pair by single-storey links, forming a symmetrical row. All the windows have wedge-shaped monolithic lintels grooved as false voussoirs, and each cottage has a modern porch.	II
Canal basin and culvert 53.50398°N 1.40914°W		c. 1798	The basin was built by the Dearne and Dove Canal to serve Hemingfield Colliery. It is lined in stone with round-edged coping stones, and there is some brickwork in the culvert. The basin is rectangular, with an arm extending from each corner. At the entrance and at the exit are segmental archways.	II
Smithy Bridge; 53.50631°N 1.39805°W		c. 1800	The bridge carries Smithy Bridge Lane (B6907 road) over the bed of the Elsecar branch of the Dearne and Dove Canal. It is in sandstone, and consists of a single elliptical arch. The bridge has voussoirs, a coped parapet, curving abutment walls, and projecting end piers.	II
4–8 Distillery Side, Elscar; 53.49508°N 1.42080°W	—	Late 18th to early 19th century	A row of cottages that has been altered, in sandstone with a stone slate roof. There are two storeys, six bays, and a single-storey rear wing. Some of the lintels are grooved to imitate voussoirs, and others have been altered.	II
Cartshed, Beech House Farm; 53.50832°N 1.39874°W	—	Early 19th century	The cartshed is in sandstone with an asbestos sheet roof. There are two storeys, five bays, and a lean-to at the end. In the ground floor is an arcade of basket-arched openings, and the upper floor contains a square opening above each arch.	II
Buildings 13–14, railway station, offices, housing and gate piers, Elsecar Central Workshops; 53.49483°N 1.41990°W	—	Early 19th century	A row of cottages, later altered and expanded to form a house, a private railway station, and offices. The buildings are in sandstone with Welsh slate roofs, they are mainly in two storeys, and have an irregular plan.	II*
Building 19, former workshop, Elsecar Ironworks; 53.49392°N 1.42009°W	—	c. 1835 (probable)	The former workshop is in sandstone, with an inner lining of brick, and a Welsh slate roof with coped gables. There are two storeys and five bays. The windows are small-paned in cast iron frames, and in the upper floor is a taking-in door with a quoined surround. Double doors have been inserted in the northeast gable end.	II*
1–3 Distillery Side, Elscar; 53.49466°N 1.41788°W	—	1836	A school, later converted for residential use, it is in sandstone with a stone slate roof. There are two storeys and a partial basement, and three bays. The windows and doorways have been altered and replaced.	II
Reform Row; 53.49844°N 1.41658°W		1837	A terrace of 28 cottages in a long curved row, in sandstone with Welsh slate roofs, coped gables and kneelers. There are two storeys, in the centre is a round-arched passage, above which is an inscribed and dated plaque, and there are two more through-passages. The doorways are arranged in pairs, each cottage has a three-light window in each floor, and there are two-light windows over the passages.	II
Holy Trinity Church, Elscar; 53.49724°N 1.41834°W		1841–43	The church, designed by J. P. Pritchett in Early English style, is in sandstone with a Welsh slate roof. It consists of a nave, a chancel with a semi-octagonal apse, a vestry and an organ chamber, and a west steeple. The steeple has a tower with two stages, clasping buttresses, rising to octagonal turrets with pinnacles, a clock face on the west side, and a recessed spire with lucarnes and a weathervane.	II
Elsecar Mill; 53.49717°N 1.41723°W		1842	The flour mill, later used for other purposes, is in sandstone with a Welsh slate roof. There are three storeys and a half-basement, six bays, and a single-storey gabled extension projecting on the right. In the third bay is a doorway, above which is a loading door, and over that a gabled wooden gantry, and the windows are small-paned.	II
Former pumping engine house, Hemingfield Colliery; 53.50380°N 1.40818°W		1843	The former Cornish pumping engine house is in sandstone, with a red brick extension added in 1934, and a flat concrete roof. It has been converted for residential use. There are two storeys and a single bay. The southwest wall is thicker and supports the concrete head beam above the pumping shaft. The northwest wall contains a large arched opening that has been blocked, and domestic windows have been inserted in the northeast wall.	II*
Buildings 20a and 21, former rolling mill, Elsecar Ironworks; 53.49424°N 1.41964°W	—	1850	The former rolling mill building, which was extended in 1860, has a cast iron frame. The gable ends are in sandstone with quoins, and the infill panels are mainly in sandstone on the east side, and brick on the west side. The roof is in Welsh slate, there is a single storey, and twelve bays, the north bay set at an angle. The iron framework includes round columns with simple capitals and bases, and between them are beams forming basket arches with perforated spandrels. Set into the ground adjacent to the north gable are two halves of a spoked colliery pit wheel.	II*
1–9 Cobcar Lane, Elscar; 53.49907°N 1.41605°W		Mid 19th century	A terrace of five houses in sandstone, with a floor band, an eaves band, stone gutter brackets, and a Welsh slate roof with coped gables and kneelers. There are two storeys, and the middle house projects under a pediment containing an oculus. Each doorway has a fanlight, the windows are sashes, all have segmental-arched lintels grooved to imitate voussoirs, and the ground floor windows have aprons.	II
Cobcar Terrace, Elscar; 53.49922°N 1.41552°W		Mid 19th century	A terrace of ten houses in sandstone, with a sill band, an eaves band, gutter brackets, and a Welsh slate roof with coped gables and kneelers. There are two storeys, each house has two bays, and the third and seventh houses project under a pediment containing an oculus. The doorways have fanlights, those in the middle two houses are round-headed with linked peaked hoods, and the other fanlights have segmental heads. The windows are sashes, and all windows and the doorways with segmental-headed fanlights have lintels grooved to imitate voussoirs.	II
Holy Trinity Academy and school house 53.49732°N 1.41879°W	—	1852	The school and separate master's house were designed by J. P. Pritchett and son. They are in sandstone with Welsh slate roofs, and the gables have decorative perforated bargeboards. The school has a single storey and a south front of three gables, each containing a small lozenge-shaped window. Below are larger windows, the central window mullioned and transomed, with a stepped hood mould. Extending from the front is a lower twin-gabled extension. The house has two storeys and three bays, the middle bay projecting under a gable.	II
56–64 Fitzwilliam Street and garden walls, Elscar; 53.49521°N 1.42349°W		c. 1853	A terrace of five houses in sandstone, with a projecting eaves course, gutter brackets, and a Welsh slate roof with coped gables. There are two storeys and five bays, the middle bay projecting under a gable containing an oculus. The central doorway is flanked by sash windows, all under a hood on brackets, and the other windows are paired sashes. The front gardens are enclosed by walls with triangular copings and simple gate posts.	II
Fitzwilliam Lodge; 53.49500°N 1.42303°W		1853	Originally a miners' lodging house, later divided into private dwellings, it is in sandstone, with floor bands, an eaves cornice, and a Welsh slate roof with coped gables. There are three storeys and a basement, a symmetrical front of seven bays, the middle three bays slightly projecting under a pediment containing an oculus, a recessed two-storey single-bay extension on the right, and a two-storey rear wing. The central doorway has a semicircular fanlight, and is set in a surround with moulded imposts, an archivolt, paterae, and a small cornice. The windows are sashes, those in the ground floor with sunken aprons.	II
Building 1, former casting shed, Elsecar Ironworks; 53.49334°N 1.41981°W	—	1850s	The casting shed, later used for other purposes, is in brick, incorporating some stonework, and has metal sheet roofs. On the west front are three large arched openings, and there is a four bay extension containing segmental-headed iron-framed windows. In the north gable are two locomotive entrances, and there are various other openings, some blocked.	II*
Buildings 4–7, former stores, Elsecar Central Workshops; 53.49409°N 1.42079°W	—	1850s	The former stores are in sandstone with Welsh slate roofs, and form a long linear range following the curve of the street. They have one storey at the north end of the range and two as it goes down the hill, and at the end is a coped gable. There are varied openings, some of which are blocked.	II*
Buildings 8–12, former workshops, offices and warehousing, Elsecar Central Workshops; 53.49473°N 1.42080°W	—	1850s	The former workshops, office and warehousing are in sandstone with Welsh slate roofs. In the centre is a two-storey office block forming a cross-wing with a coped gable containing a circular window. This is flanked by long single-storey ranges that were formerly warehouses and workshops.	II*
Building 17, former fitting shop, Elsecar Central Workshops; 53.49460°N 1.42034°W		1850s	The workshop is in sandstone with an inner lining of brick, and Welsh slate roofs. It consists of a wide nave, and lean-to aisles, the west aisle with ten bays, and the east with seven. The gable ends are quoined and coped. Each contains a large central round-arched opening, above which is a central ventilation opening and an inscribed datestone.	II*
Building 22, former joiner's shop, chimney and boiler house, Elsecar Central Workshops; 53.49439°N 1.42051°W	—	1850s	The workshop with an integral engine house is in sandstone, with an inner lining of brick, string courses, and hipped Welsh slate roofs. There are two storeys, it is eight bays long and three wide. In the ground floor are basket-arched openings with voussoirs and keystones, and the upper floor contains a taking-in door with a winch. On the southern end is a cantilevered staircase leading to an upper floor doorway with a round-arched fanlight. At the northern end is the boiler chimney with a square base rising to a cornice, above which it is octagonal and tapering, and has a corniced cap.	II*
Former housing, Elsecar Ironworks; 53.49367°N 1.42031°W	—	1850s	A pair of workers' cottages, they are in sandstone on the west front, mainly in brick elsewhere, and with Welsh slate roofs. There are two storeys, the left cottage has three bays, and the right cottage has two. In the centre of each cottage is a doorway with a fanlight, that in the left cottage set in a round-arched recess. The windows in the right cottage are sashes, and the others have been altered.	II*
Buildings 2 and 3, entry range and wall, Elsecar Ironworks; 53.49349°N 1.42018°W	—	1860s	The entrance building to the ironworks, it is in sandstone on the west front, with brick elsewhere, and Welsh slate roofs. It consists of a linear range with two storeys and six bays. In the ground floor are two wide basket-arched entrances with quoined and chamfered surrounds, and the upper floor contains four round-arched windows. The western face of the boundary wall is in stone, the eastern face in brick, and it contains three blocked round-arched windows.	II*
Milton Hall; 53.49461°N 1.42172°W		1870	A market hall, later an assembly hall, it is in sandstone on a plinth, with an eaves band, and a triple-span hipped Welsh slate roof. There is a single storey, with five bays on Wath Road, and nine on Fitzwilliam Street. The middle bay on each front projects slightly and has a pediment with a cornice and an apex block. Both middle bays have a round-arched recess with impost bands, and contain a doorway with a semicircular fanlight. The windows have round-arched heads.	II
