= Coal seams of the South Yorkshire Coalfield =

List of coal seams in the South Yorkshire Coalfield, England

The coal seams worked in the South Yorkshire Coalfield lie mainly in the middle coal measures within what is now formally referred to as the Pennine Coal Measures Group. These are a series of mudstones, shales, sandstones, and coal seams laid down towards the end of the Carboniferous period between about 320 and 300 million years ago. The total depth of the strata is about 1.2 kilometres (0.75 mi).

The list of coal seams that follows starts at the shallowest seam and proceeds downwards with the outcrops occurring progressively further west until the deepest coal seam, the Silkstone Seam which outcropped at the western edge of the coalfield.

The thicknesses and depths of each seam are not given as they vary across the coalfield.

== Seams ==
Coal Seam	Description	Outcrop
Shafton Seam	Industrial & Brick Making Coal. Also known as the Billingley Seam.	
Swinton Pottery Seam	A poor quality coal; however the seatearth underlying the coal was used for brick making.	
Newhill Seam	A household coal.	
Meltonfield or Wathwood Seam	A household coal also used for coke making.	
Two Foot Coal, Royston or Halfyard Seam	The seam was rarely worked and was often split by a dirt parting.	This seam outcrops at the eastern edge of Rainborough Park and near Hoober Hall.
Winter or Abdy Seam	This seam is called the winter seam north of Barnsley and the Abdy seam south of the town. A household coal with a low sulphur content which was not mined extensively because the roof of the seam was often a shaly mudstone which made mining it difficult.	Old workings of this seam are visible near Jump and Hemingfield.
The Top and Low Beamshaw Seams	These seams produce a good household coal with a low sulphur content, but are often split by shales, and in places they are separated by 10 m of dirt.	In the past, this seam could be seen exposed in Barnsley around the railway station. It is not often exposed elsewhere.
Kents Thin Seam	A good household coal.	This coal seam is exposed in railway cuttings around Hoyland and Stubbin.
Kents Thick, Mapplewell or High Hazles Seam	A good household coal. The seam is split by a thin dirt parting. This seam is at its thickest north of the Dearne where it has been worked around Mapplewell village.	The outcrop runs from Far Moor House to the Dearne Valley at Mapplewell then south through Barnsley to High Hoyland. It has also been found from Kingswood through Hoober to Rawmarsh.
Barnsley Rider Seam	This thin band of coal lies 15 to 30 m above the main Barnsley Seam and is not often worked. The seam is generally split by dirt and clay partings and the coal itself often contains pyrites.	The outcrop is exposed in Kingswood near Elsecar.
Barnsley or Top Hards Seam	This was the most important seam in the coal field, and 50% of the coalfield's output came from this seam. It was generally 3 m thick. The seams consistency varied from top to bottom. The upper portion was a bright soft coal, the middle portion a hard dull coal known as the "hards" and the lower portion another band of bright soft coal. The hards were used in locomotives and steam ships. The soft coals were mixed with other coals for coke making.	The seam outcrops first near Far Moor House and then heads south towards Barnsley where it passes through what is now the western suburbs. South of Barnsley the outcrop is disrupted by faults as it passes Worsbrough and Elsecar. The outcrop reaches the River Don Faults east of Greasbrough. The seam was the object of the controversial mining operations at Wentworth Woodhouse.
Dunsil Seam	Between the Barnsley Seam and the Swallow Wood seam numerous thin seams of coal are found. To the south and east of Barnsley these coalesce to form the Dunsil seam, a poor quality coal with a high ash and sulphur content.	The outcrop of this coal is confused by faults but can be seen near Wentworth Park.
Swallow Wood, Netherwood or Top Haigh Moor Seam	The quality of this coal seam varied but it generally provided a household and gas coal and was some times used as second class steam coal. The seam was often split by dirt partings. The better quality coal was found north of Barnsley.	The outcrop starts west of Barugh and heads south eastwards towards Worsbrough reservoir where it is offset by faults towards the west and runs around Stainborough and Rockley. It is then seen around Wentworth Park and runs to the North of Greasbrough and onto the River Don.
Lidgett Seam	A household coal that forms a thin seam with shale partings. This seam has not often been worked.	Outcrops by Pilley and Greasbrough.
Joan Seam	A thin seam of coal not generally worked as it is often mixed with shales.	Outcrops around High Hoyland, Cawthorne and Greasborough.
The Flockton Seams	There are two seams of Flockton coal, the Flockton thin which is the lowest and generally too thin to work and the Flockton Thick 30 m above the latter. This is a good household and coking coal. The thick seam itself is split in two by a dirt band, often 1 m thick.	The seams outcrop around High Hoyland, Cawthorne down to Stainborough and onwards to Scholes Coppice and Greasbrough.
Fenton Seam	A gas & coking Coal. The seam is often split by a "spavins", thin layers of earthy clay with rootlets or larger partings of shale. This often results in two distinct seams called High and Low Fenton.	The Fenton coals outcrop south of Thorpe Hesley, but can also be seen near Wentworth Castle.
Parkgate Seam	A good quality industrial coal used for gas manufacture that after the Barnsley seam is the most important in the South Yorkshire Coalfield. This is a three part seam consisting of Tops, Bottoms (used for gas manufacture) and the middle hards. The tops are split into Bright Hards which contain small spherical pyrites inclusions called "Brazils" and softs. The Middle Hards are a good steam generating coal. The coal forming the top and bottom few inches of this seam were often very poor quality, containing sulphur and forming large amounts of ash. These layers were called "bags" or "dandies" were left in place.	The Parkgate Seam outcrop appears between Cawthorne and High Hoyland and runs SSE towards Rotherham passing through Silkstone Common, Bagger Wood, Stainborough Castle, West Wood, Hesley Park and Dropping Well.
Thorncliffe Thin Seam	A good quality low ash coal that was used for steam raising, gas and house coal. The smalls were used for coke manufacture. The seam, whilst extensive over the coalfield, was often split by dirt partings.	This seam was worked at the outcrop close to Silkstone which then runs towards Stainborough fold.
Swilley or New Hards Seam	Coal suitable for gas and coke production. The seam consists of two parts the "tops" and the "bottoms" split by a dirt parting. The seam is very variable and seen little south of Barnsley.	Outcrops on the south side of the Dearne Valley south of Bilham
Silkstone Fourfoot or Wheatley Lime Seam	Coal suitable for household and industrial use.	Outcrops around Cawthorne.
Silkstone Seam	A high quality, low sulphur coal used for coke manufacture and as a manufacturing and household coal. The seam deteriorated to the north and south of the coalfield as it was split by dirt partings. Named after the village where the seam outcropped. The seam consists of three parts: bottom and top softs and branch. The softs are a bright coal sometimes with inclusions of pyrites. The branch is a dull hard coal band that lies over the softs.	The outcrop runs in a south south easterly direction from Cawthorne, through Silkstone and Chapeltown to Dropping Well.
Ringinglow Seam	Stratigraphically this was the lowest coal seam ever worked in the Sheffield area.	Outcrops in Barber Fields close to the Limb Brook at Ringinglow Sheffield.

== Sources ==
- Hill, Alan (2001). The South Yorkshire Coalfield A History & Development. Tempus.
- Geology of the Country around Barnsley. Her Majesty's Stationery Office. 1947.
