= Peckett OQ Class =

British steam locomotives

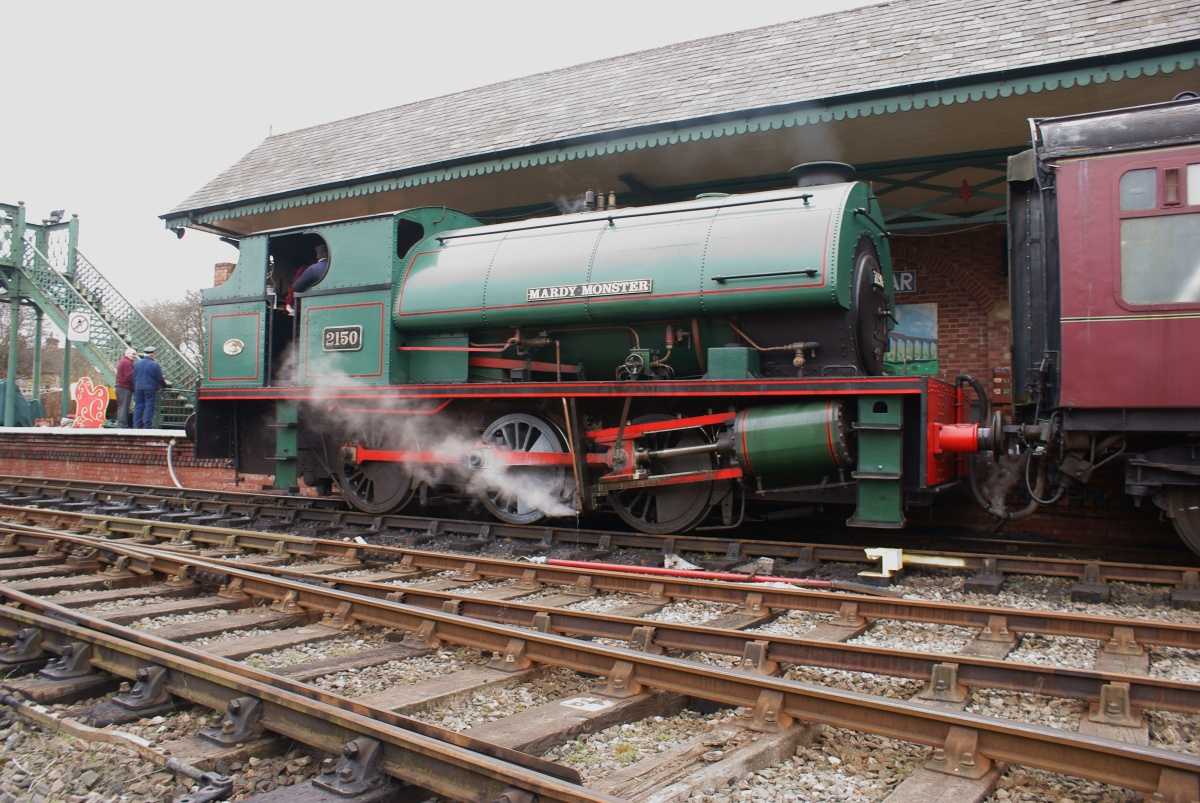
- Peckett OQ Class 0-6-0ST No. 2150 Mardy Monster at the Elsecar Heritage Railway
Type and origin
- Power type: Steam
- Builder: Peckett & Sons
- Serial number: 2124, 2150–2151
- Model: OQ
- Build date: 1951–1954
- Total produced: 3
Specifications
- Configuration
  - Whyte: 0-6-0ST
- Gauge: 4 ft 8 1/2 in (1,435 mm)
- Driver dia.: 4 ft 0 1/2 in (1.232 m)
- Loco weight: 55 tons
- Fuel type: Coal
- Firebox
  - Grate area: 19.1 sq ft (1.77 m^{2})
- Boiler pressure: 200 psi (1.38 MPa)
- Heating surface: 921 sq ft (85.6 m^{2})
- Cylinders: Two, outside
- Cylinder size: 18 in × 26 in (457 mm × 660 mm)
Performance figures
- Tractive effort: 29,527 lbf (131.34 kN)
Career
- Operators: Mardy Colliery; Tower Colliery
- Disposition: 2 scrapped, 1 preserved

The Peckett OQ Class is a class of 0-6-0ST steam locomotives built in Bristol, England by Peckett & Sons. Three were built; no. 2124 for Tower Colliery in 1951 and nos. 2150 and 2151 for Mardy Colliery in 1954. No. 2150 has been preserved and is named Mardy Monster. According to Heritage Railway magazine it is "Britain’s most powerful industrial locomotive". This claim may be misleading because it is based on tractive effort rather than horsepower.

== Preservation ==
After being withdrawn in 1976, No. 2150 was preserved by the Swanage Railway in 1979. In 1997 it was purchased by the Elsecar Heritage Railway, returning to service in June 2003. It was withdrawn after its boiler certificate expired in 2013. Its overhaul was never finished and it was sold in 2020 and moved to Boden Rail Engineering of Nottingham where the work was completed in 2025.
