= Hemingfield =

Village in South Yorkshire, England

Coordinates: 53.516°N 1.400°W

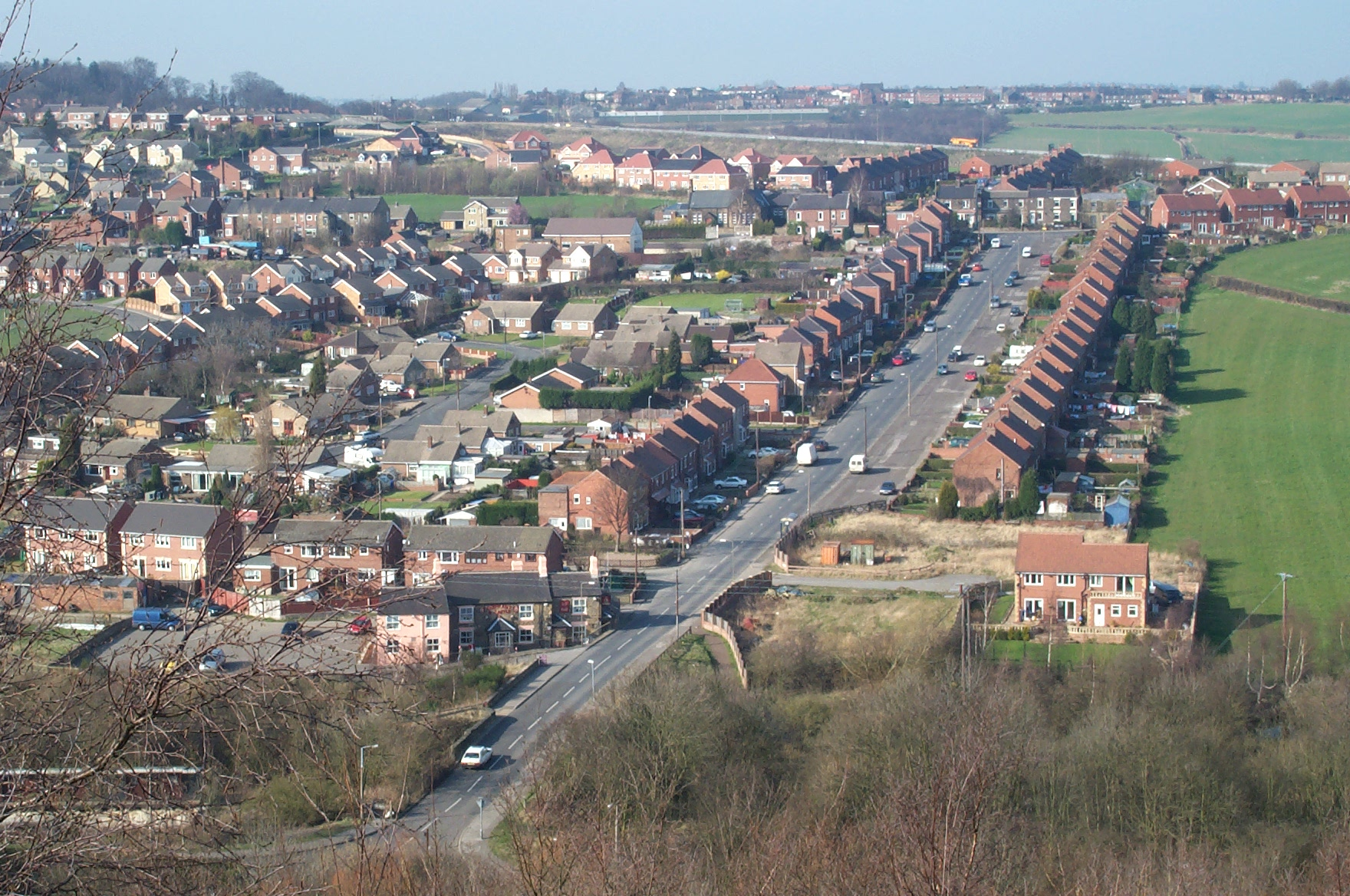

- Location within South Yorkshire
- Metropolitan borough: Barnsley
- Metropolitan county: South Yorkshire
- Region: Yorkshire and the Humber
- Country: England
- Sovereign state: United Kingdom
- Post town: BARNSLEY
- Postcode district: S73
- Dialling code: 01226
- Police: South Yorkshire
- Fire: South Yorkshire
- Ambulance: Yorkshire
- UK Parliament: Barnsley South

Hemingfield is a village in the metropolitan borough of Barnsley, South Yorkshire, England. The village falls within the Hoyland Milton Ward of Barnsley Metropolitan Borough Council. The village has two pubs, The Albion and The Elephant & Castle, as well as a post office and The Ellis CofE Primary School. Notable organisations, past and present, include Hemingfield Action Group (HAG) and Albion AFC.

In the Imperial Gazetteer of England and Wales (1870–72) John Marius Wilson described Hemingfield:

HEMINGFIELD, a village in Wombwell township, Darfield parish, W. R. Yorkshire; 4 miles SE of Barnesley. Pop., 346. It has a post office under Barnesley, and a charity school.

== Etymology ==
Legend has it the village gets its name from a Viking named 'Heming' who settled and established a farmstead. Hence, it was "Heming's field".

== Hemingfield Colliery ==
Hemingfield Colliery, also known as Elsecar Low Colliery, opened in 1840, and first produced coal in 1848. The colliery is now preserved as a heritage attraction by the Friends of Hemingfield Colliery.

== Hemingfield railway station ==
The Elsecar Heritage Railway currently terminates at Hemingfield, although there is no platform at present, with trains pausing before reversing back to Elsecar. However, a proposed extension of the railway to Cortonwood is well advanced, and a memorandum of understanding has been signed by the railway company and the friends of the colliery, agreeing that an intermediate station will be constructed at Hemingfield.

A joint development project with the University of Sheffield School of Architecture in autumn 2016 resulted in initial proposals for a station at Hemingfield with the low-level platform connected to the high-level colliery buildings by means of a tall station building incorporating stairs and lifts.

== Sport ==
The village was represented in the FA Cup by Hemingfield F.C. in the 1920s.

== Notable people ==
- Fred Butcher, footballer

== Transport ==
The number 67 Jump Circular bus runs in both directions through the village every hour. Wombwell railway station is the closest rail link to the village.

== See also ==
- Listed buildings in Hoyland Milton
