= Fred Butcher =

English footballer

Personal information
- Full name: Fred William Butcher
- Date of birth: 14 August 1913
- Place of birth: Hemingfield, England
- Date of death: May 1996 (aged 82)
- Height: 5 ft 7 in (1.70 m)
- Position: Left back

Youth career
- Hoyland

Senior career*
| Years | Team | Apps | (Gls) |
- Wombwell
| 1931–1936 | Aston Villa | 2 | (0) |
| 1936–1938 | Blackpool | 4 | (0) |
| 1938–1939 | Swindon Town | 36 | (0) |
- * Club domestic league appearances and goals

Frederick William Butcher (14 August 1913 – May 1996) was an English professional footballer. A left back, he played in the Football League for Aston Villa, Blackpool and Swindon Town.

== Career ==
Butcher began his professional career with Aston Villa in April 1931. After two League appearances for the Villains, he joined Blackpool in June 1936. He made four League appearances for the Lancashire club before joining his last known club, Swindon Town, in 1938. He made a total of 42 appearances for Town.
