= Cortonwood =

Colliery in South Yorkshire, England

Coordinates: 53.509°N 1.385°W

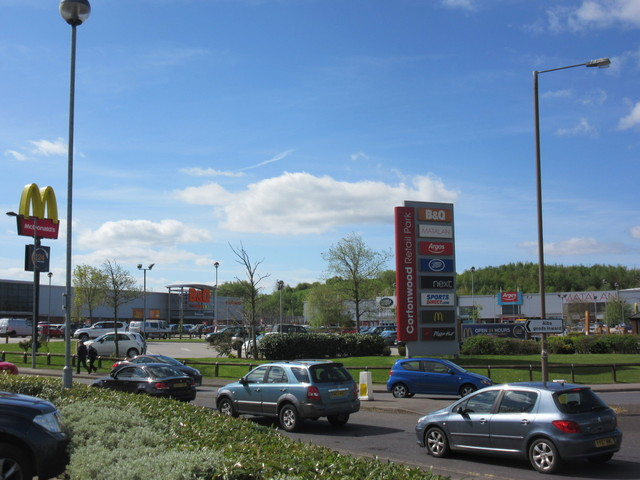
- Cortonwood Retail Park

- Location within South Yorkshire
- Metropolitan borough: Rotherham
- Metropolitan county: South Yorkshire
- Region: Yorkshire and the Humber
- Country: England
- Sovereign state: United Kingdom
- Post town: Barnsley
- Postcode district: S73
- Dialling code: 01226
- Police: South Yorkshire
- Fire: South Yorkshire
- Ambulance: Yorkshire
- UK Parliament: Wentworth and Dearne

Cortonwood was a colliery near Rotherham, South Yorkshire, England. The colliery's proposed closure was a tipping point in the 1984–1985 miners' strike. The site is now a shopping and leisure centre.

== History ==
Cortonwood colliery was sunk in 1873, a year after the formation of the Brampton Colliery Company, which took its name from the local parish of Brampton Bierlow, near Rotherham. By March 1875, two shafts had been dug to a depth of 285 yards (261 m) to work the Barnsley Seam which was at a depth of 218 yards (199 m). The shafts were two of the deepest in the South Yorkshire Coalfield at that time. In 1908, the depths of the shafts were increased to 506 yards (463 m) to access the Parkgate Seam which was located at 481 yards (440 m) down. From 1927 onwards, the Swallow Wood and Silkstone Seams were being mined and the Parkgate and Barnsley Seams were worked out. During the 1970s, Cortonwood was producing only coking coal for steel plants. The Silkstone Seam which was first developed in 1927, was to become just a few years later, on 9 December 1932 the scene of a tragic explosion in which 4 men lost their lives immediately and 3 more died as a consequence of it later.

In March 1984, when the price of coking coal had fallen dramatically, the National Coal Board announced that the mine was due to close, due to the large stocks of coking coal that the colliery produced. The proposed closure of Cortonwood became the "final straw" in a series of closures which brought about the long-running UK miners' strike (1984–1985). The colliery officially closed on 25 October 1985 with full clearance of the stocks and buildings by the end of 1986.

The site has now been converted into a shopping and leisure area. It features big names such as B&Q, Matalan, Next, Boots, Morrisons, McDonald's, Argos, Pizza Hut, Asda Living, Sports Direct, SCS, Halfords, Smyths Toys, Pets at Home, TK Maxx and many factories and office buildings. Cortonwood now falls within the Hoober ward of Rotherham Metropolitan Council. It is accessed via the Dearne Valley Parkway (A6195 road).

Work to extend the park began in May 2016. The expansion was expected to see the arrival of retailers such as River Island, H&M, New Look, Outfit, Poundland, JD Sports, M&S, Wilko and Frankie and Benny's and create up to 300 jobs for the local area.

== Heritage railway future ==
The Elsecar Heritage Railway were planning to extend to a proposed new railway station at Cortonwood in the future as finances allow with certification from local councils and the Office of Road and Rail granting level crossing approved status being confirmed in February 2017. As of a result of the Covid 19 pandemic, plans were apruptly disrupted leaving the railway line unfinished of its plans.

== Sport ==
Cortonwood F. C. represented the village in the FA Cup during the 1930s.
