= Elsecar Heritage Centre =

Living history museum in Elsecar, England

Coordinates: 53°29′38″N 1°25′11″W

Elsecar Heritage Centre is a visitor attraction centre in Elsecar, Barnsley, England. Operated by Barnsley Museums, it has independent shops, studios, galleries and cafes in former Victorian engineering workshops. It also has a large antiques centre. A visitor centre and regular tours share the unique history of the village, an industrial estate village of ironworks and collieries, built for the Earls Fitzwilliam of Wentworth Woodhouse. Elsecar is now recognised to be of international significance, one of the UK's first model villages and a precursor to places like Saltaire.

Close to the heritage centre, at the Elsecar New Colliery, is a Newcomen steam engine, the only such engine still in its original location and now understood to be the world's oldest steam engine still in situ.

== Heritage Centre ==
=== The New Yard ===
The New Yard workshops were built for Earl Fitzwilliam in 1850, as a base for carpenters, engineers, joiners, blacksmiths and others who supported the village's collieries, ironworks and the Wentworth Woodhouse estate. The workshops later became part of the National Coal Board until closure in the 1980s.

The New Yard is now home to almost 40 independent shops, galleries, cafes, a children's play space and large antiques centre.

A visitor centre has exhibits, films, interactive displays for children and an in-depth digital reconstruction of what the village and its valley looked like in the year 1880.

=== The Elsecar Ironworks ===
The rolling mill of the former Elsecar Ironworks now hosts large events, including antiques fairs, maker markets, concerts and weddings.

=== The Earl's Great Engine ===
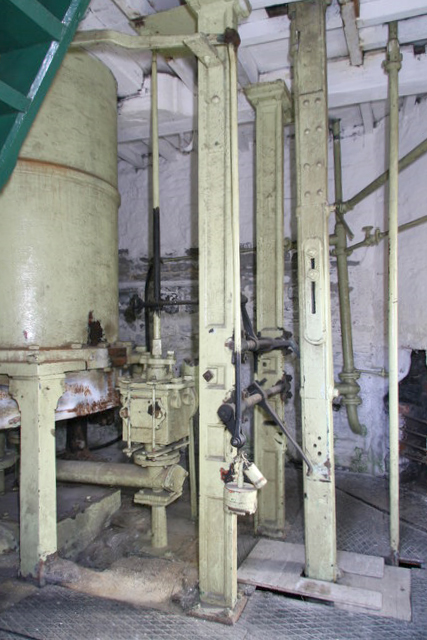
Elsecar Newcomen engine

The Elsecar New Colliery is the site of the only Newcomen beam engine in the world still in its original location, built in 1795 at the instruction of William Wentworth, the 4th Earl Fitzwilliam.

It is now recognised to be the world's oldest steam engine still in place anywhere.

It pumped water out of Elsecar New Colliery and ran from 1795 until 1923 when it was replaced by electric pumps. In 1973 the engine was classified as a scheduled monument.

The engine was restored to working order (worked by hydraulics) over the period 2012–14.

Visitors can visit it 7 days a week (except in extreme weather) and on special open days and weekly tours between Easter and October each year.

== See also ==
- Listed buildings in Hoyland Milton
- Elsecar Heritage Railway
