= Elsecar Collieries =

Former collieries in South Yorkshire, England

Coordinates: 53.497°N 1.418°W

The Elsecar Collieries were the coal mines sunk in and around Elsecar, a small village to the south of Barnsley in what is now South Yorkshire, but was traditionally in the West Riding of Yorkshire.

The last operating mine, Elsecar Main, closed in 1983 and with its closure ended 230 years of mining in the village

== Elsecar Old Colliery ==
The colliery was started around 1750 by Richard Bingley but was taken over in 1752 by the 2nd Marquis of Rockingham and by 1757 comprised eight pits in and around Elsecar Green. The pits were sunk to a depth of 15 metres to exploit the Barnsley Bed. The pits were described as three air pits or ventilation shafts, two open pits, one closed pit, one working pit and one sinking pit. They were worked using a horse gin – a horse powered winch. From 1750 until about 1795 the pits employed around nine men. In 1782 the 2nd Marquis of Rockingham died and his estates were inherited by his cousin the 4th Earl Fitzwilliam. He expanded Elsecar Old Colliery and installed steam winding engines in 1796 and by 1848 the pit was employing 87 men and boys. The colliery was renamed Elsecar High Colliery in the same year. By now the colliery was centred on the Milton Foundry. The colliery closed when its reserves were exhausted in 1888.

== Elsecar New Colliery ==
Elsecar New Colliery was sunk around 1795 by Earl Fitzwilliam to the south of Elsecar Workshops and the site has its original Newcomen pumping engine. It was sunk to allow the Fitzwilliams to expand coal production and exploit new transport opportunities presented by the Elsecar branch of the Dearne & Dove Canal which was given parliamentary approval in 1793 and reached Elsecar in 1799. Before the completion of the canal the coal was either sold locally or shipped by cart to Kilnhurst on the River Don.

The colliery had three shafts, two for coal winding and one pumping shaft. They were 120 feet deep where they reached the Barnsley seam. Steam winding engines were installed in 1796 and a pumping engine was added in 1823 when the shafts were deepened to reach the Parkgate seam. The colliery was expanded in 1837, with the addition of a new shaft at Jump known as the Jump Pit. By 1848 when the colliery was renamed Elsecar Mid Colliery and employed 121 men and boys. This colliery was abandoned in the mid-1850s as the Simon Wood Colliery started production.

== Elsecar Low Colliery or Hemingfield Colliery ==
Work to sink Elsecar Low Colliery started around 1840 but took 6–8 years to complete and the first significant coal was mined in 1848 when 1000 tonnes a day was being extracted (4). The major difficulty was the penetration of water into the workings and dealing with large amounts of firedamp. The colliery had two shafts, a winding shaft and a smaller diameter pumping shaft for draining the colliery. The colliery suffered a significant accident on 21 December 1852 when a firedamp explosion killed 10 miners and injured 12. The inquiry found that the explosion had been caused by reckless behaviour of the colliers; a ventilation door had been propped open which resulted in firedamp accumulating and some colliers using unguarded safety lamps. Earl Fitzwilliam's mine superintendent, Benjamin Biram was criticised by the inquiry for absence of printed rules in the colliery, inadequate maintenance of lamps and poor supervision of the workforce but the judge praised the ventilation arrangements in the pit which prevented extensive loss of life.

== Simon Wood Colliery ==
Simon Wood Colliery was sunk to 85 meters to the Barnsley bed in 1853. The colliery with its two shafts replaced the Elsecar Mid Colliery and continued production until 1903 when it was replaced by Elsecar Main Colliery.

== Elsecar Main ==
Coal extraction proper began at Elsecar Main between 1905 and 1908 when shafts were sunk to the Parkgate seam at 333 metres. Other seams worked were the Silkstone, Thorncliffe and the Swallow Wood seams. The Haigh Moor, Lidgett and towards the end of the colliery's life, Kents Thick seams were also mined. The colliery closed in October 1983.

== See also ==
- Earl Fitzwilliam's private railway
