= Elsecar Heritage Railway =

Railway line in South Yorkshire, England

Coordinates: 53.49374°N 1.41927°W

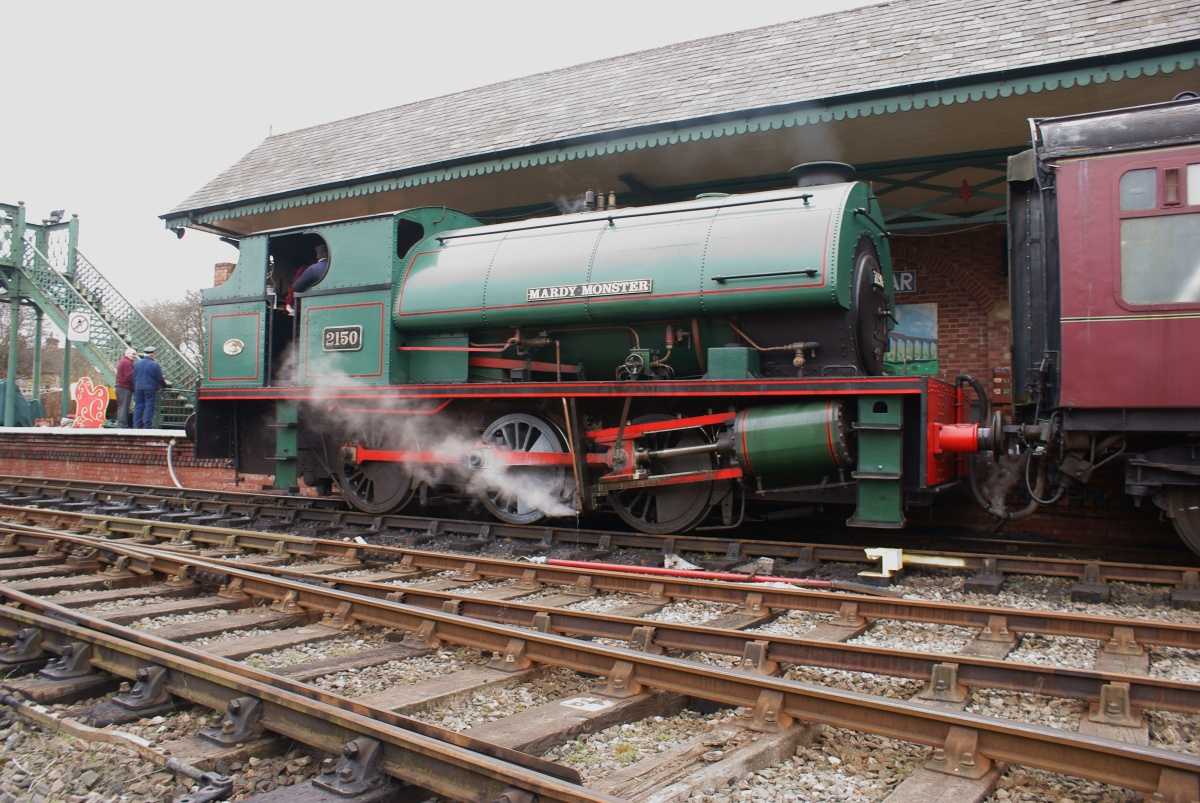
- Peckett OQ Class no. 2150 "Mardy Monster" at the Elsecar Heritage Railway
- Terminus: Elsecar- Rockingham station

Commercial operations
- Name: Elsecar Heritage Railway
- Built by: South Yorkshire Railway
- Original gauge: 4 ft 8 1/2 in (1,435 mm) standard gauge

Preserved operations
- Owned by: Earl Fitzwilliam, Barnsley Council, Elsecar Railway Preservation Group, Elsecar Heritage Railway Ltd
- Operated by: Elsecar Heritage Railway Ltd
- Stations: One, at Elsecar (Rockingham station)
- Length: 1 mile (1.6 km)
- Preserved gauge: 4 ft 8 1/2 in (1,435 mm) standard gauge

Commercial history
- Opened: 1850
- Closed: 1984

Preservation history
- 1994: Reopened
- 2020: Closed
- Headquarters: Elsecar, Rockingham station

The Elsecar Heritage Railway (EHR) was located on the southern part of the former South Yorkshire Railway freight-only branch which ran from Elsecar Junction on its Mexborough to Barnsley Line.

The Elsecar Heritage Railway operated an out and back tourist train ride on a 1 mile (1.6 km) section of the branch using steam and diesel locomotives, previously running between Rockingham station (at the back of the Elsecar Heritage Centre) and Hemingfield Basin. The railway was operated using a variety of different preserved rolling stock.

The EHR had planned to eventually operate the line into Cortonwood, with a new halt at Hemingfield, doubling the length of the line to two miles (3.2 km).

== History ==
The line was built to serve Earl Fitzwilliam's collieries and ironworks, which he leased out to local ironmasters. It opened in 1850 as part of the South Yorkshire Railway, known as the Elsecar Branch. Following assorted mergers the line finally became part of the LNER upon formation of the Big Four.

The whole infrastructure was nationalised after the Second World War, with the mines becoming part of the National Coal Board in 1947 and the railway becoming part of British Railways in 1948.

The Elsecar branch closed in 1984 following closure of the final colliery on the line.

Restoration began in 1994 as a project of Barnsley Metropolitan Borough Council, and the line reopened as a heritage railway in 1996, operated by the council. The Elsecar Heritage Railway became the operator in 2006.

== Closure ==
Elsecar Heritage Railway was mothballed indefinitely when its operators surrendered their lease in November 2020; it was reported at the time that a commitment was made by Barnsley Council to reopen the site.

In November 2023 Barnsley Council and Historic England announced plans to re-open the site with a track engineering college with places for 400 students each year and employment for 40 staff. The £25 million plan has been allocated some funding from the Cultural Development Fund though the plans are not expected to happen straight away. Other ideas for developing the site include a restaurant, a cycle hire centre, an outdoor performance area, and public spaces.

On 14 July 2026 Barnsley Council invited the public to submit proposals for the future of the Elsecar Heritage Railway. They wrote, We (Barnsley Council) are in the process of completing a master planning exercise for the site that will enable us to develop a shared vision for the Centre and work with major funders to secure future investment.

== Motive power ==
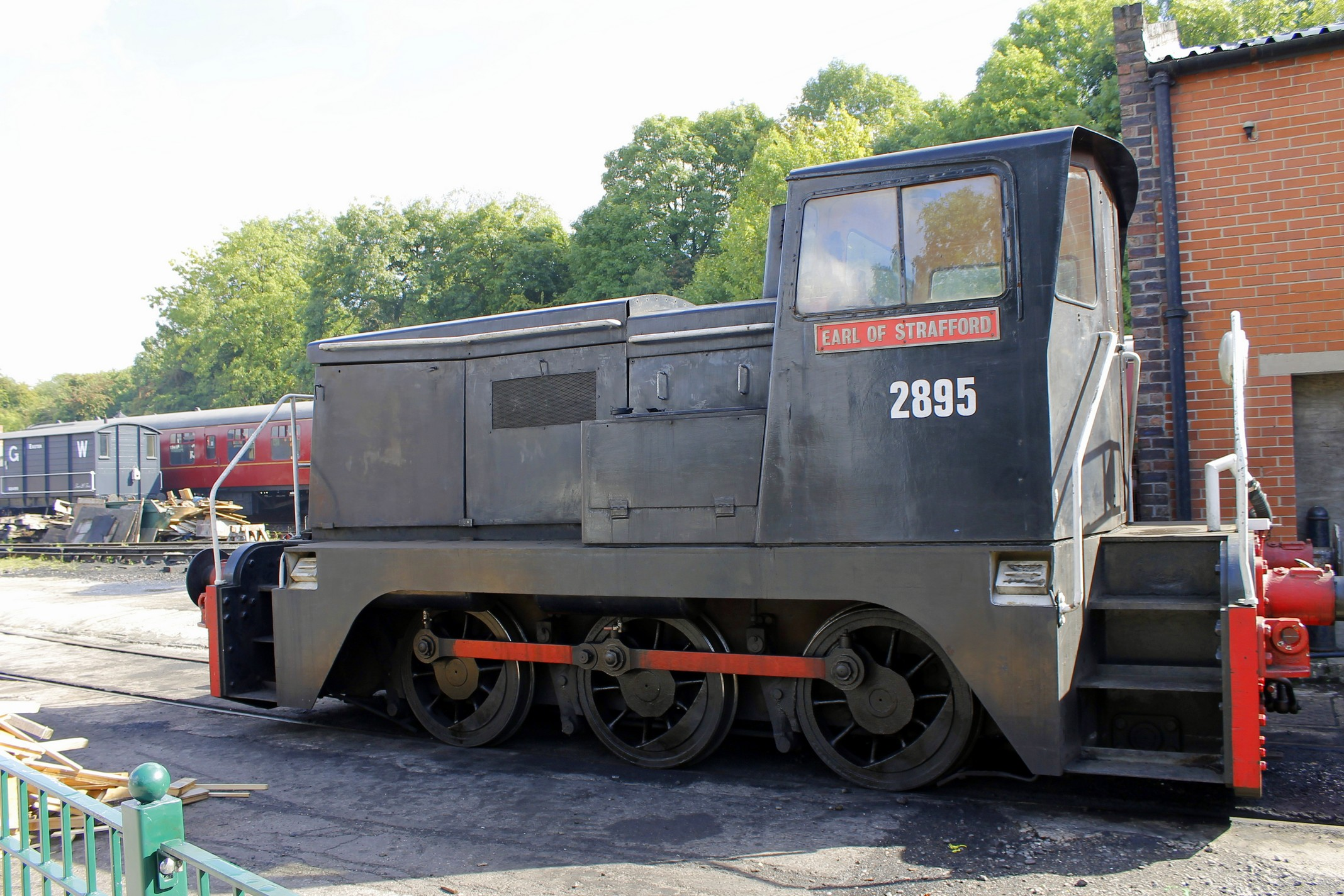
Diesel locomotive No 2895 Earl of Strafford

=== Steam locomotives ===
The railway's collection of steam locomotives were used regularly for passenger services.

- Sentinel 0-4-0VBT No. 6807 Gervase. (Running number 10) (Operational, returned to steam in 2013).
- Sentinel 0-4-0VBT No. 9376 (unnamed). (Running number 7) (Scrapped).
- Sentinel 4wVBT No. 9599 William. (Operational, returned to steam in 2017).
- Peckett OQ Class 0-6-0ST No. 2150 Mardy Monster. (Undergoing overhaul).
- Avonside 0-6-0ST No. 1917 Earl Fitzwilliam, formerly Pitsford. (Stored).
- Robert Stephenson and Hawthorns 0-4-0ST No. 7386 Birkenhead. (Undergoing overhaul).

=== Diesel locomotives ===
The railway's diesel locomotives were used to operate both passenger and engineering trains.

- Hunslet Engine Co. 0-6-0DH No. 6950 Louise. (Operational.)
- Yorkshire Engine Company 0-6-0DE No. 2895 Earl of Strafford. (Operational.)
- Sentinel 4w Elizabeth. (Operational.)

=== Other motive power ===
- Wickham trolley track inspection vehicle. (In storage, awaiting restoration.)

== Coaching stock ==
Coaching stock was painted in British Railways 'lined maroon' livery.

- BR Mk 1 TSO No. 3958. (In service.)
- BR Mk 1 TSO No. 4903. (In service.)
- BR Mk 1 BSK No. 35305. (In service.)
- BR Mk 1 SK No. 25562. (In service.)

== Stations ==
- Rockingham – Terminus and headquarters, serving the Elsecar Heritage Centre.
- Hemingfield – current temporary terminus, with groundworks complete for proposed new intermediate station.
- Cortonwood – planned new terminus station on the railway's Cortonwood extension.

== Cortonwood extension ==
The railway's extension, under construction from 2012-2014, involved the reinstatement of two level crossings, Tingle Bridge Lane and Smithy Bridge Lane. As Tingle Bridge Lane is a relatively busy road, the railway constructed a semi-automated barrier system, with barriers manually lowered from a signal box, but automatically raised by track circuitry. On 16 May 2011 the materials for the level crossing arrived and a donation scheme was set up to raise the remainder of the money needed. Funds raised through this scheme have been used to purchase barriers and traffic signals for the crossing. In August 2012 trial holes were dug to locate services under the road surface ready for construction of the crossing to take place.

On 21 June 2012 the ground was cleared and levelled for ballast and track alterations in anticipation of constructing the station at Hemingfield, currently the end of the line.

On 19 April 2013 the EHR built the level crossing on Tingle Bridge Lane, financed by a Director's loan, and began extending the line into Cortonwood Colliery.

By June 2014 the whole track had been laid up to Cortonwood, with minor levelling and ballasting remaining to become operational. However, as the railway has been mothballed, the track has been laid idle and the level crossings disassembled.

== Cortonwood memorial ==
In November 2013 the EHR received a lottery grant of £50,000 to finance the provision of a Coal Mining Memorial Park at Cortonwood Colliery, a nationally important site, where the 1984/5 Miners Strike began. The project was completed in November 2014.

== See also ==
- Earl Fitzwilliam's private railway
