= Elsecar =

Village in South Yorkshire, England

Coordinates: 53.496°N 1.412°W

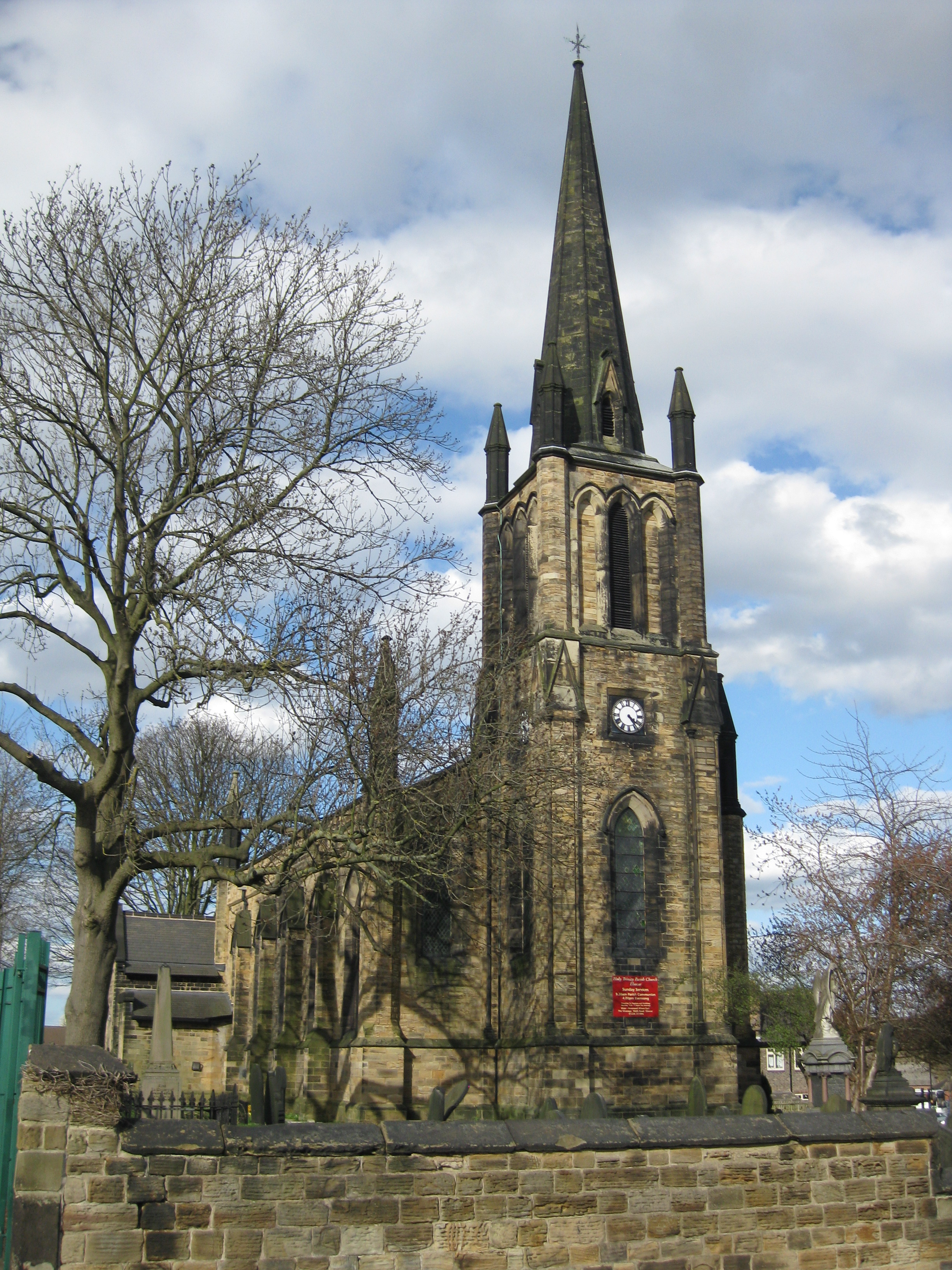
- Holy Trinity Parish Church in Elsecar

- Location within South Yorkshire
- Population: 2,500 (2001)
- OS grid reference: SE389001
  - London: 145 mi (233 km) S
- Metropolitan borough: Barnsley
- Metropolitan county: South Yorkshire
- Region: Yorkshire and the Humber
- Country: England
- Sovereign state: United Kingdom
- Post town: BARNSLEY
- Postcode district: S74
- Dialling code: 01226
- Police: South Yorkshire
- Fire: South Yorkshire
- Ambulance: Yorkshire
- UK Parliament: Barnsley South

Elsecar (/ˈɛlsɪkɑːr/, locally /ˈɛlsɪkər/) is a village in the Metropolitan Borough of Barnsley in South Yorkshire, England. It is near to Jump and Wentworth, it is also 2 miles (3.2 km) south of Hoyland, 6 miles (9.7 km) south of Barnsley and 8 miles (13 km) north-east of Sheffield. Elsecar falls within the Barnsley Metropolitan Borough Ward of Hoyland Milton.

Elsecar is unique as a name. It is thought to derive from the Old English personal name of Aelfsige (mentioned in Cartulary of Nostell Priory, 1259–66) and the Old Norse word kjarr, denoting a marsh or brushwood.

From the late 18th century, Elsecar was transformed into an 'industrial estate village' for nearby Wentworth Woodhouse, with multiple collieries and two major ironworks. It is seen as one of the UK's first model villages and a precursor to Saltaire.

A 1795 Newcomen steam engine at the Elsecar New Colliery is the oldest steam engine still in situ, anywhere in the world.

== History ==
In 1870–72, John Marius Wilson's Imperial Gazetteer of England and Wales described Elsecar as having a population of 1912 and 353 dwelling places.

The village had developed rapidly since a century before, when it had been just a handful of cottages around a village green and a scattering of shallow coal pits, in a valley alongside an ancient stream.

=== An Industrial Estate Village ===
Elsecar's development from the late 18th century can be seen as a microcosm of the whole Industrial Revolution in Britain. The village was nothing more than a series of farms until the 18th century. Although coal had been mined in the area since the 14th century, the first major colliery, Elsecar Old, was not sunk until 1750. It was taken on by the Marquis of Rockingham in 1752, later consolidated onto a hilltop to the west of the village and is thought to have been painted by George Stubbs, around the same time he painted Whistle Jacket.

The village was transformed from the 1790s at the direction of the 4th Earl Fitzwilliam of Wentworth Woodhouse, with the sinking of its first deep colliery, the cutting of a canal, the building of two ironworks and associated housing designed by architect John Carr of York. As a result, Elsecar is now recognised to be one of the first model villages in the UK and a precursor to historic places such as Saltaire.

The subsequent development and expansion of the village continued to be closely overseen by the Fitzwilliam dynasty. Uniquely in Europe, Elsecar is understood to have been an 'industrial estate village', built and operated in addition to the family's traditional aristocratic estate village of Wentworth.

Additions to the village instructed by the Earls in the mid 19th century included rows of miners and ironworkers' cottages, a miners lodging house, church, indoor market, coaching inn, school, cricket club and architecturally impressive workshops, known as the New Yard. A private railway station for the Earl, including a waiting room for privileged and Royal guests, was added in 1870 and now serves as a nursery for local children.

=== The Elsecar Collieries ===
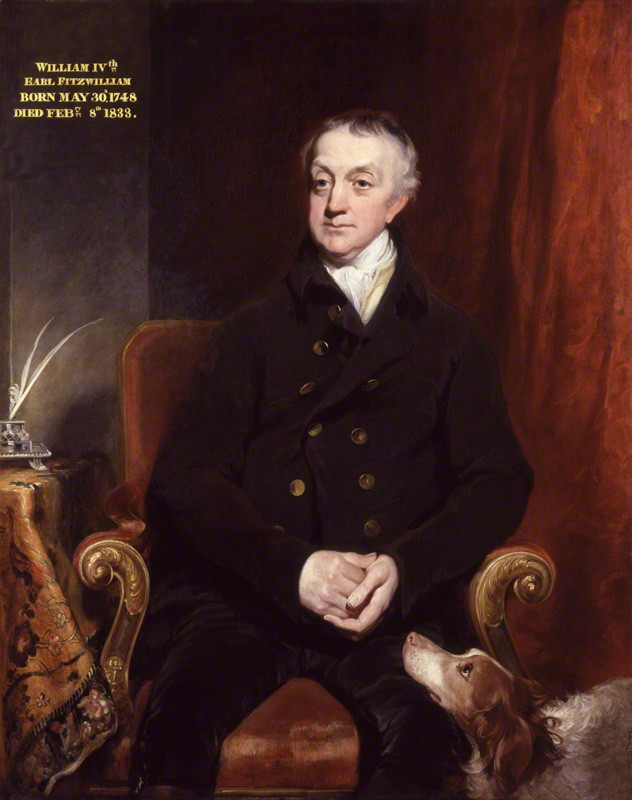
The 4th Earl Fitzwilliam

The Earls oversaw expansion of deep coalmining and sinking of new collieries for over a century and maintained a direct controlling interest in the management of the village's collieries until nationalisation in 1947.

In 1794-5, the village's first deep colliery was sunk, a few metres to the east of the village's proposed canal basin. Over the following years, Elsecar New Colliery was expanded and the original Elsecar (Old) Colliery modernised. In the 1840s and 1850s, two state-of-the-art collieries were sunk, Simon Wood and Elsecar Low (later renamed Hemingfield). The latter survives, has been rescued and is now in community ownership.

In 1851, Queen Victoria was taken outside the Great Exhibition, to see a column of Barnsley Seam coal which had been somehow mined intact by Elsecar miners and taken to London.

The last colliery to open was Elsecar Main in 1908. King George V went underground there in 1912, for which he received respect and recognition, as news had come through that morning of a terrible disaster at Cadeby Colliery. King George was not the first Royal to go underground in the UK, as he acknowledged during his visit. King William IV, when Duke of Clarence, had been taken into Elsecar Old Colliery in 1828.

Elsecar Main Colliery was closed in October 1983. Many Elsecar colliers went to work at Cortonwood, just down the canal towpath, where a few months later the Miners Strike of 1984-5 began. Elsecar Workshops were sold off by British Coal soon after, ending the village's ties to the coal industry.

In the following years, the village suffered from severe economic and social problems, as did all the mining villages in the region. The mid-1990s saw the repurposing of the former colliery workshops into a new visitor destination, Elsecar Heritage Centre.

=== The Elsecar Newcomen Engine ===
During the sinking of the Elsecar New Colliery in 1795, Earl Fitzwilliam had a large atmospheric beam engine installed to pump water from deep underground.

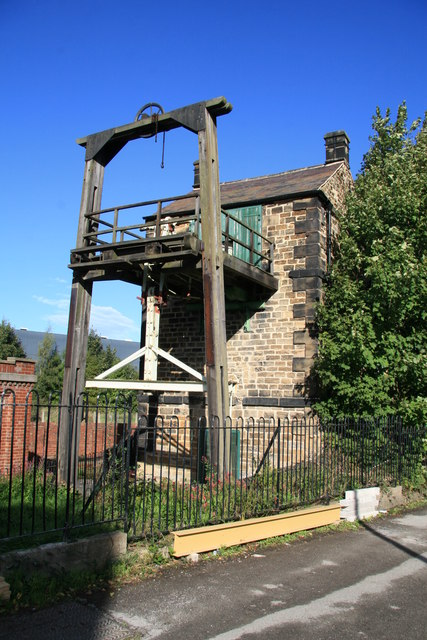
The Elsecar New Colliery Engine House

It is of the type invented by Thomas Newcomen in 1712. Newcomen invented the world's first practical steam engine, creating mechanical power using steam for the first time. Newcomen's genius was to use the force of atmospheric pressure acting on a piston at the top of a steam-filled cylinder, into which water had been injected to create a vacuum, to move the piston and a beam attached to it.

James Watt made the steam engine far more efficient half a century later, but by that time Newcomen engines were widely established and powering industry across the UK and further afield.

Now a Scheduled Ancient Monument, the Elsecar Newcomen is understood to be the oldest steam engine in the world still in situ where it was originally built.

The engine pumped water from the colliery workings from 1795 to 1923. In 1928, Henry Ford visited Elsecar and tried to purchase the engine to take it back to his new museum in America. His request was refused by Earl Fitzwilliam.

In 2014, a major project was completed to rescue and conserve the engine, supported by Barnsley Council, the National Lottery Heritage Fund and Historic England. It now runs on hydraulics with regular open days from Easter to October each year when visitors can also look down the New Colliery mineshafts.

=== The Elsecar & Milton Ironworks ===
John and William Darwin & Co. of Sheffield opened the first furnace at Elsecar Ironworks (at the bottom of Forge Lane) in 1795. In 1799 another ironworks was founded at Milton, by the Walker Brothers of Rotherham, less than a mile to the west of Elsecar, on a hilltop in full view of the village of Wentworth just across the valley.

The Earls maintained a close involvement in the village's two ironworks. Although leased to a series of major ironmasters from their establishment in the 1790s to closure in the 1880s. the ironworks were at times managed direct as part of the Wentworth Woodhouse estate. In the second half of the 19th century, both ironworks were leased and operated together by famous ironmakers the Dawes Brothers, originally from West Bromwich.

In 1838 a horse-drawn tramroad was constructed to link the Dearne and Dove Canal with the Milton Ironworks, Tankersley Park ironstone mines, Lidgett Colliery and the Thorncliffe Ironworks at Chapeltown. Stationary engines were used for the incline sections, and remained in operation until about 1880.

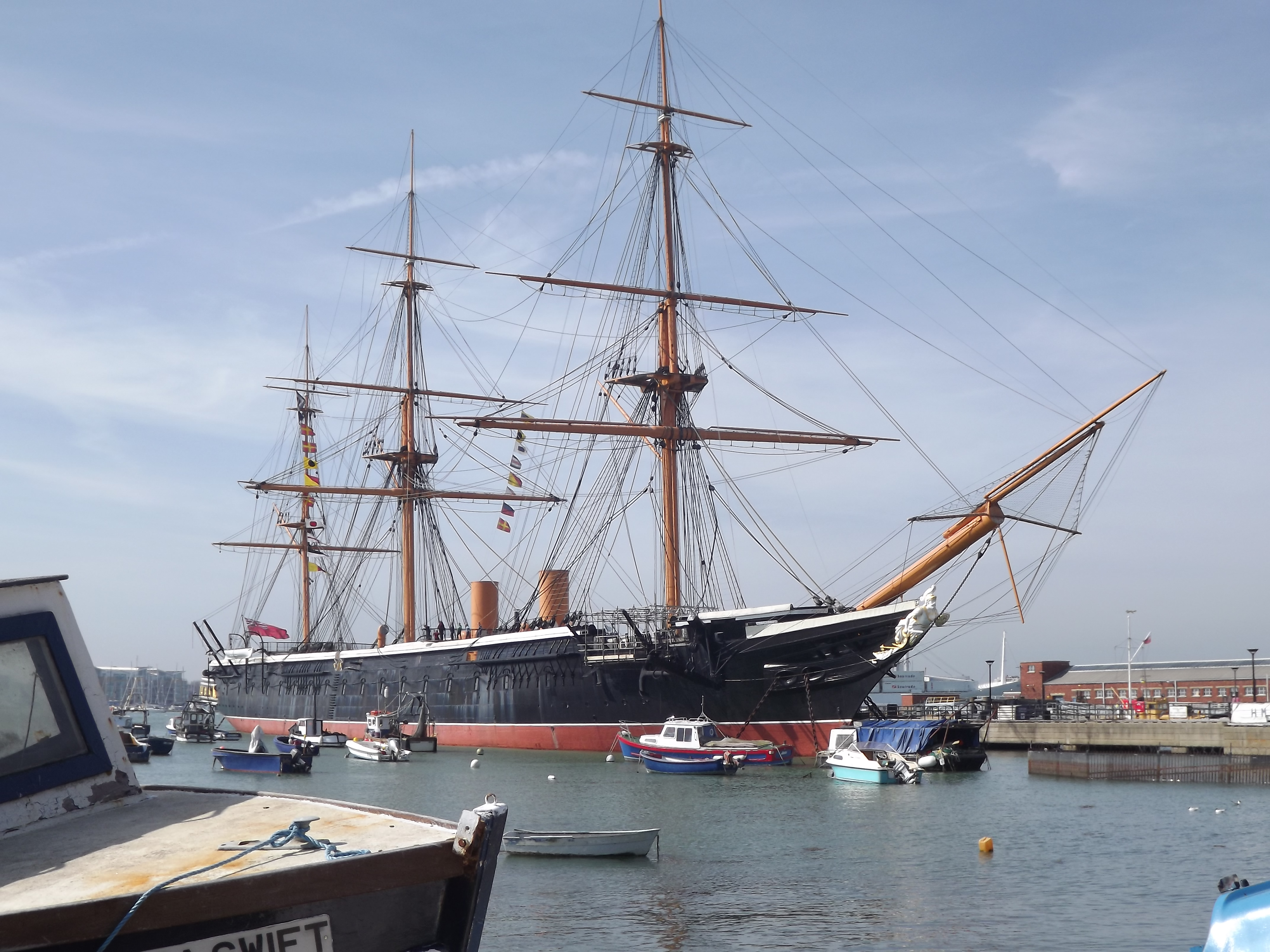
HMS Warrior

The two Elsecar Ironworks are credited with a variety of major achievements, including making iron for John Rennie's bridge over the Thames at Southwark which opened in 1819, bridges designed for the Isle de Bourbon (now Reunion) by Marc Isambard Brunel, the steam engine at Leawood on the Cromford Canal, iron with which armour plate was rolled for HMS Warrior and replacement bridges for Sheffield when the city's bridges were destroyed in the Great Sheffield Flood of 1864.

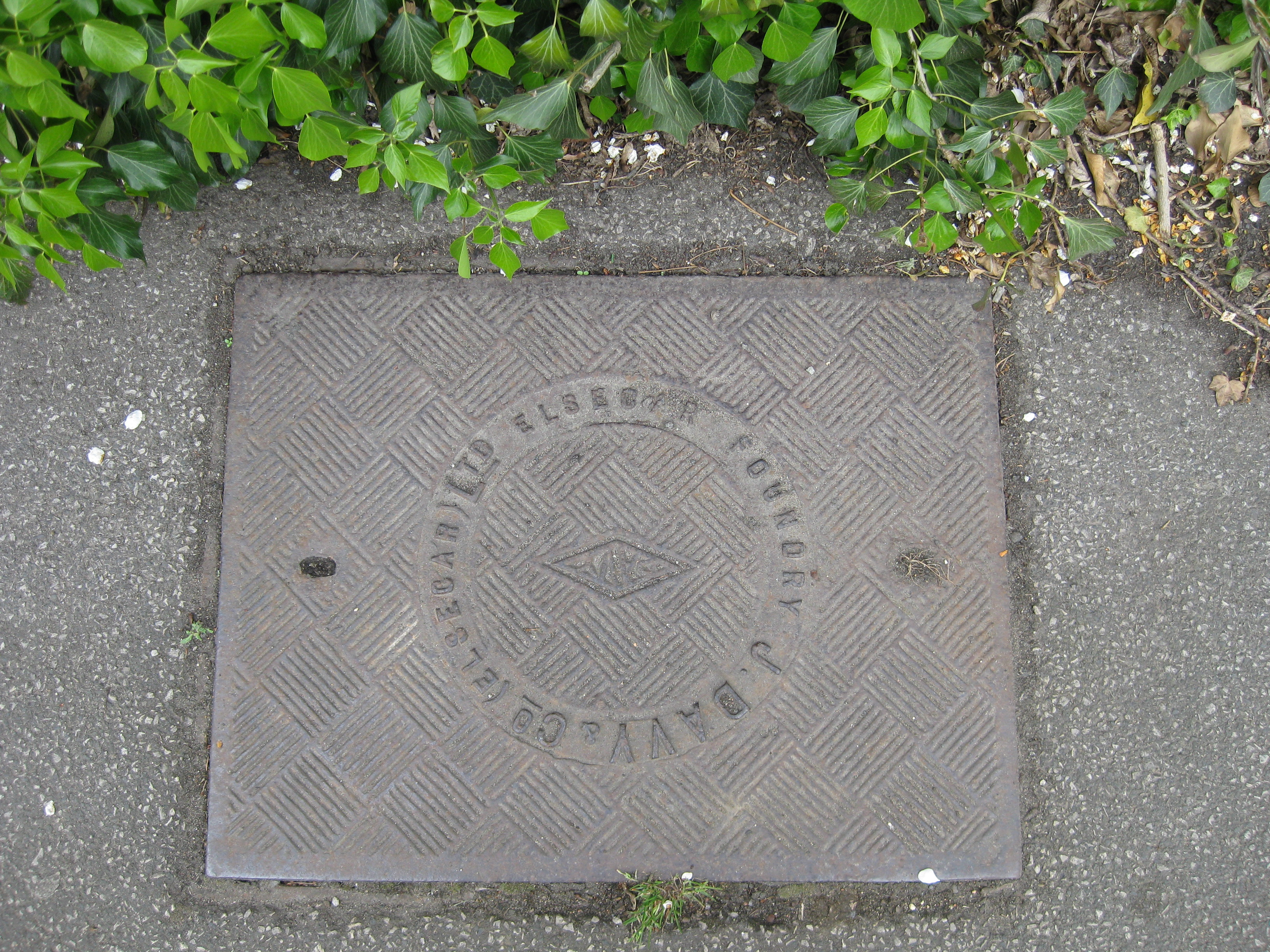
Manhole cover from an Elsecar foundry

Two smaller family-run forges were also established in the mid 19th century and survived well into the 20th century, including the Davey Brothers foundry, whose drain and manhole covers can still be seen across the village.

The two main Elsecar ironworks were closed in the 1880s.

The Milton Ironworks was on the site of what is now the Forge Playing Field. Remains include what's left of the blast wall, a bank running across the field, and furnace ponds by The Furnace pub.

The Elsecar ironworks is once of the best surviving industrial complexes from the mid-19th century. After the ironworks was closed in the 1880s, its buildings were integrated into the colliery workshops and the ironworks largely forgotten until very recently.

A Scheduled Ancient Monument as of 2018, the casting shed, rolling mill, workshop, entrance arch and offices have survived intact. The impressive blast wall, blowing engine house, waggon ways, ironworks reservoir and charging plateau have survived in ruinous form and plans are being made for their future conservation.

=== The Elsecar Valley ===
The landscape around the village has extensive archaeological remains and historic sites, which can be explored on organised guided tours.

They include ironworks ruins and ponds, furnace charging plateau, collieries, bell pits, footrills, mineshafts, waggon ways, the industrial canal and reservoir, canal basins, early-Victorian railway, clinker-reinforced trackways, lime kiln sites, coking furnaces and much else.

Built heritage that survives in the village is similarly extensive, including miners and ironworkers housing, historic pubs, cricket club, parsonage, vicarage, toll house, miners lodging house, the Milton Hall exhibition hall, the church, steam mill, two schools, and the extensive buildings of the New Yard workshops and Elsecar Ironworks.

=== Elsecar-by-the-Sea ===
In 1910 a local amateur photographer, Herbert Parkin, took photographs of families paddling in the local reservoir and sent them into the Sheffield Star with the caption Elsecar-by-the-Sea.

The name caught on and with the help of a good transport link from Sheffield via the local railway station, a thriving tourism business was established.

Between the wars, Hoyland Nether Urban District Council created a public park to take advantage of the influx of visitors, on land granted by Earl Fitzwilliam, adding a boating jetty to the reservoir, a pavilion cafe and bandstands. The village flourished as the seaside resort at the heart of the Yorkshire coalfield.

Since 2008, the name Elsecar-by-the-Sea has been used for the village gala, which takes place in the park each September.

=== The Elsecar Heritage Action Zone ===
In March 2017 Elsecar was designated as one of ten Heritage Action Zones (HAZ) by Historic England with the benefit that the area would receive a share of £6 million.

As part of the HAZ project, in 2019 a Historic Area Assessment was developed, "intended to illustrate the varied character and significance of the village and its setting in order to inform interpretation, conservation and development under the direction of revised planning guidance".

To inform this, there was an extensive programme of historical research, archaeology, architectural investigation and community involvement.

Of particular note, two major community digs, planned and carried out involving dozens of volunteers, took place on the Milton Ironworks and the New Colliery boiler house. In 2017 Caesium magnetometer, Ground Penetrating Radar (GPR) and Earth Resistance Tomography (ERT) surveys were conducted at Elsecar to attempt to determine the location of a number of former industrial buildings.

A major legacy of the Elsecar Heritage Action Zone was the creation of two new Scheduled Ancient Monuments at Hemingfield Colliery and the Elsecar Ironworks, the extension of the village conservation areas and extensive listings, creating many new Grade II* listed buildings.

== Attractions ==
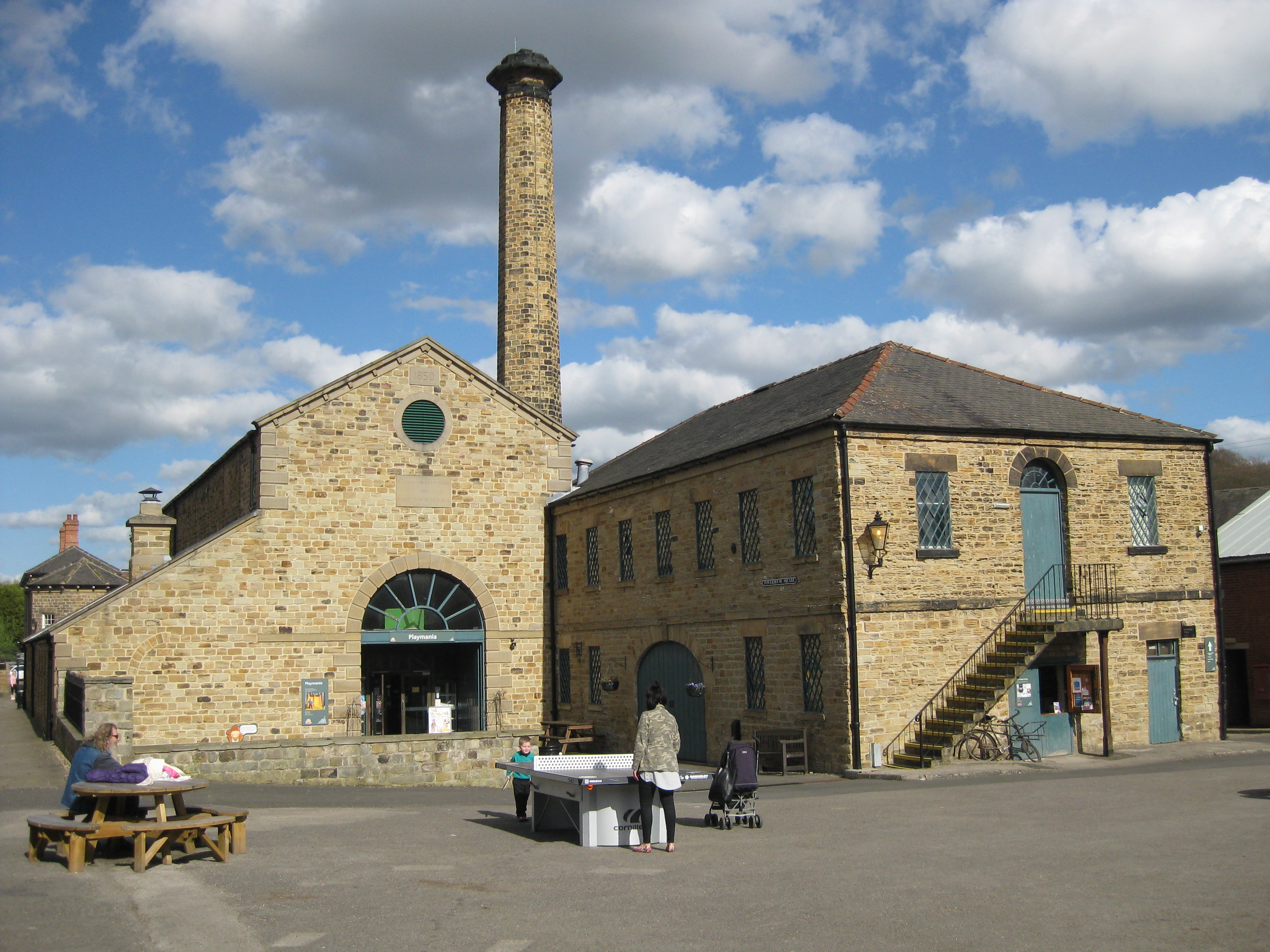
Elsecar Heritage Centre

Elsecar Heritage Centre is a visitor attraction based in the former New Yard colliery workshops. Operated by Barnsley Museums, it has independent shops, studios, galleries, cafes and a large antiques centre.

A visitor centre and regular tours share the history of the village. It also includes a highly detailed digital reconstruction of the village and valley as it was in the 1880.

The former rolling mill of the Elsecar Ironworks is now a major event space, with standing capacity of up to 1000 people.

Elsecar Park has a bandstand, children's playground, a cafe, and a pitch and putt golf course. The reservoir, now a local nature reserve, is adjacent to the upper park.

The landscape and valley have extensive archaeological remains, but many are on private land or in dangerous locations. It is recommended that all visitors keep to public rights of way or take organised tours.

== Transport ==
Elsecar has its own railway station on the Hallam and Penistone lines so it is possible to make direct journeys to Barnsley, Sheffield, Leeds, Huddersfield, and Wakefield. Buses run to and from Barnsley, Rotherham and Sheffield.

Elsecar Junction was located on the Woodhead Line, some distance from Elsecar, close to the Wath marshalling yard. The line including the marshalling yard closed in 1988.

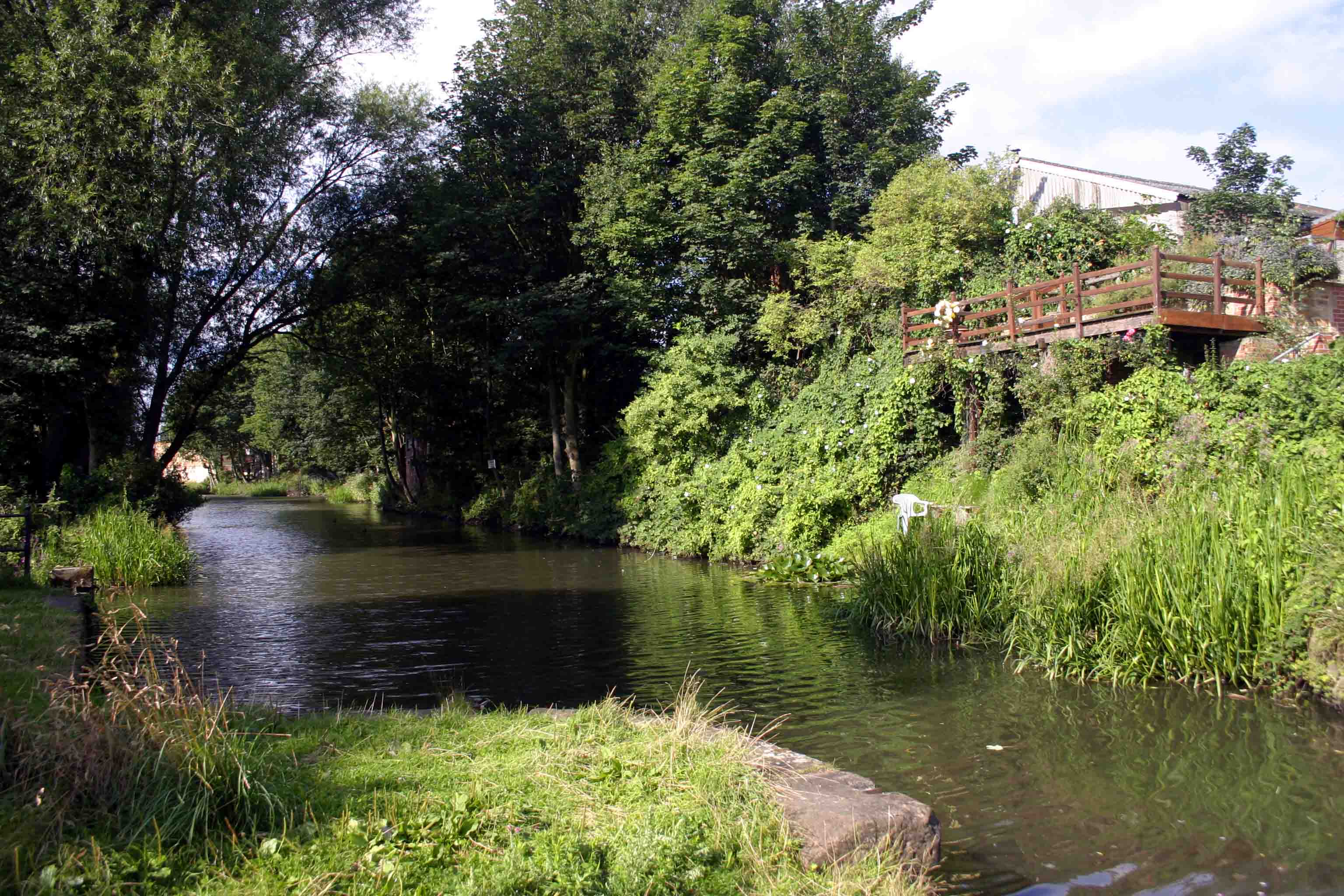
Elsecar Branch of the Dove & Dearne Canal

Elsecar Heritage Railway was based next to the heritage centre. It ran a pleasure service between Rockingham Station, a replica station built in the 1990s in the centre of the Elsecar Ironworks, and Hemingfield Canal Basin, although passengers could not alight at Hemingfield Basin.

The charitable trust which operated the railway ceased operating the line at the start of the COVID pandemic and in July 2020 handed their lease back to the local Council. The Council has released statements that it hopes to create a sustainable future for a new heritage railway attraction in the village.

In 1793 An Act of Parliament authorised the making of the Dearne and Dove Canal between Swinton and Barnsley, with two branches, one to Worsbrough and another to Elsecar at a location then known as Cobcar Ing.

The canal was later extended into the centre of village, next to the New Colliery and Elsecar Ironworks, and was fully opened in 1798. The upper stretch of the canal was restored in the 1990s. Its towpath is now part of the Trans Pennine Trail and has recently been restored and widened with funding from the South Yorkshire Mayoral Combined Authority.

== Sport ==
The village has its own cricket club, established in 1854, which plays in the South Yorkshire Cricket League. It also has several junior teams that play in the Barnsley & District Junior Cricket Association.

It was represented in the FA Cup by Elsecar Main F.C. in the 1900s.

== Notable people ==
- George Utley, football player, was born in Reform Row in Elsecar.
- Bobby Knutt, comedian and entertainer, lived in Elsecar for several years.
- Laban Solomon (d. 1903), hymn composer and a favourite of Queen Victoria, lived on Church Street and is buried in Elsecar churchyard beneath a kneeling angel.

== Photos ==
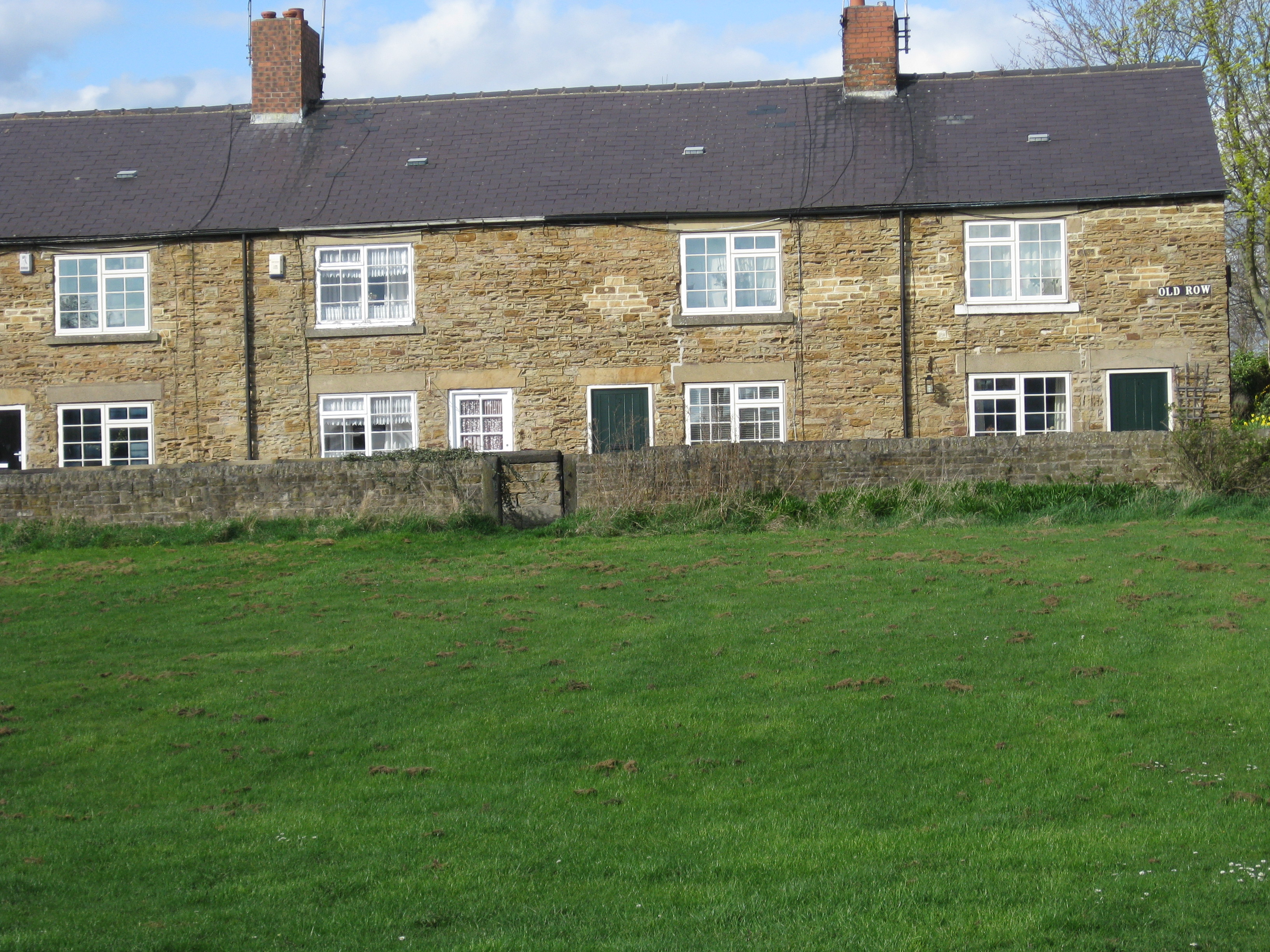
Former miners' and steelworkers' cottages by the village green

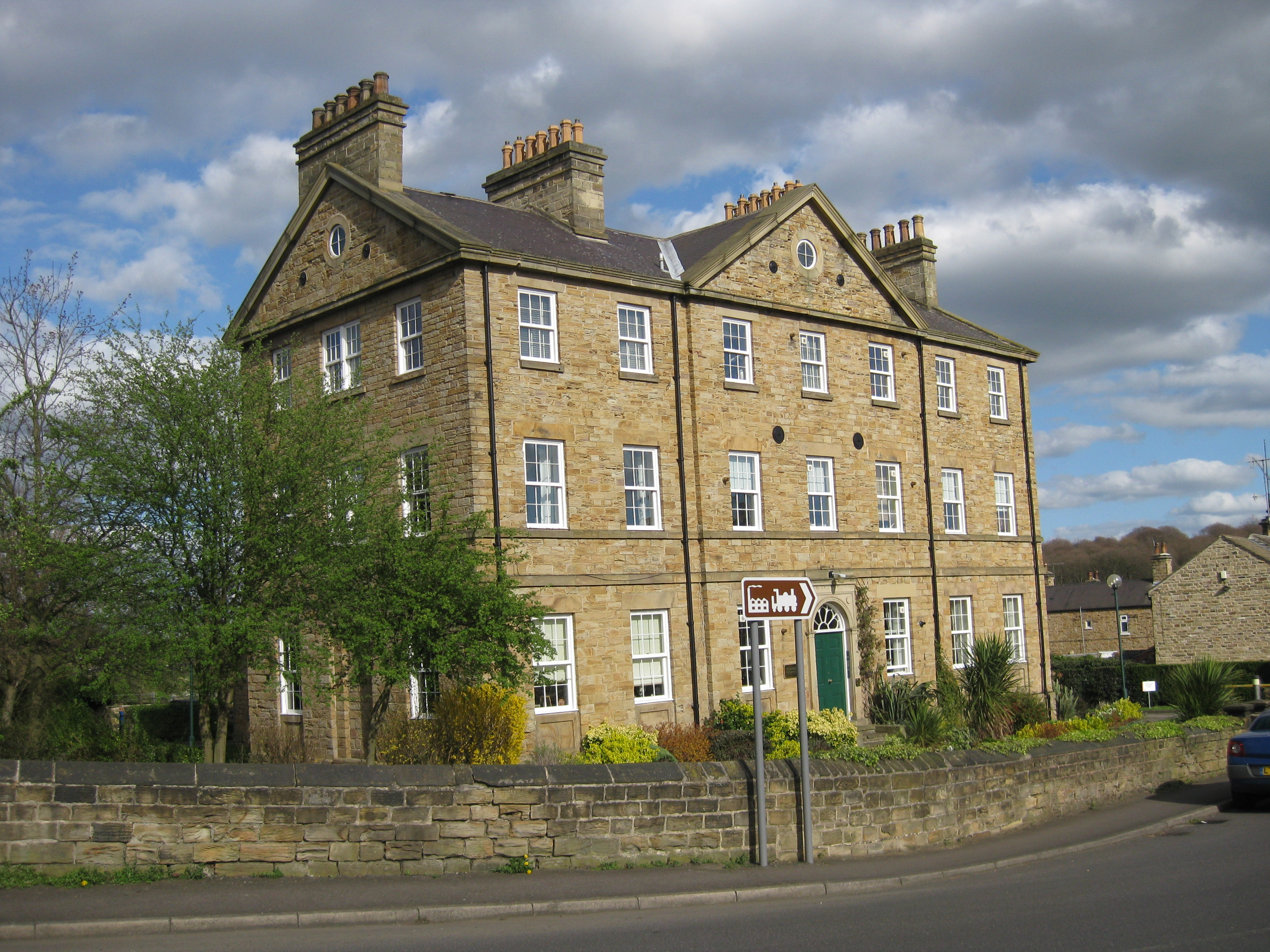
Former lodging house for miners (1853)

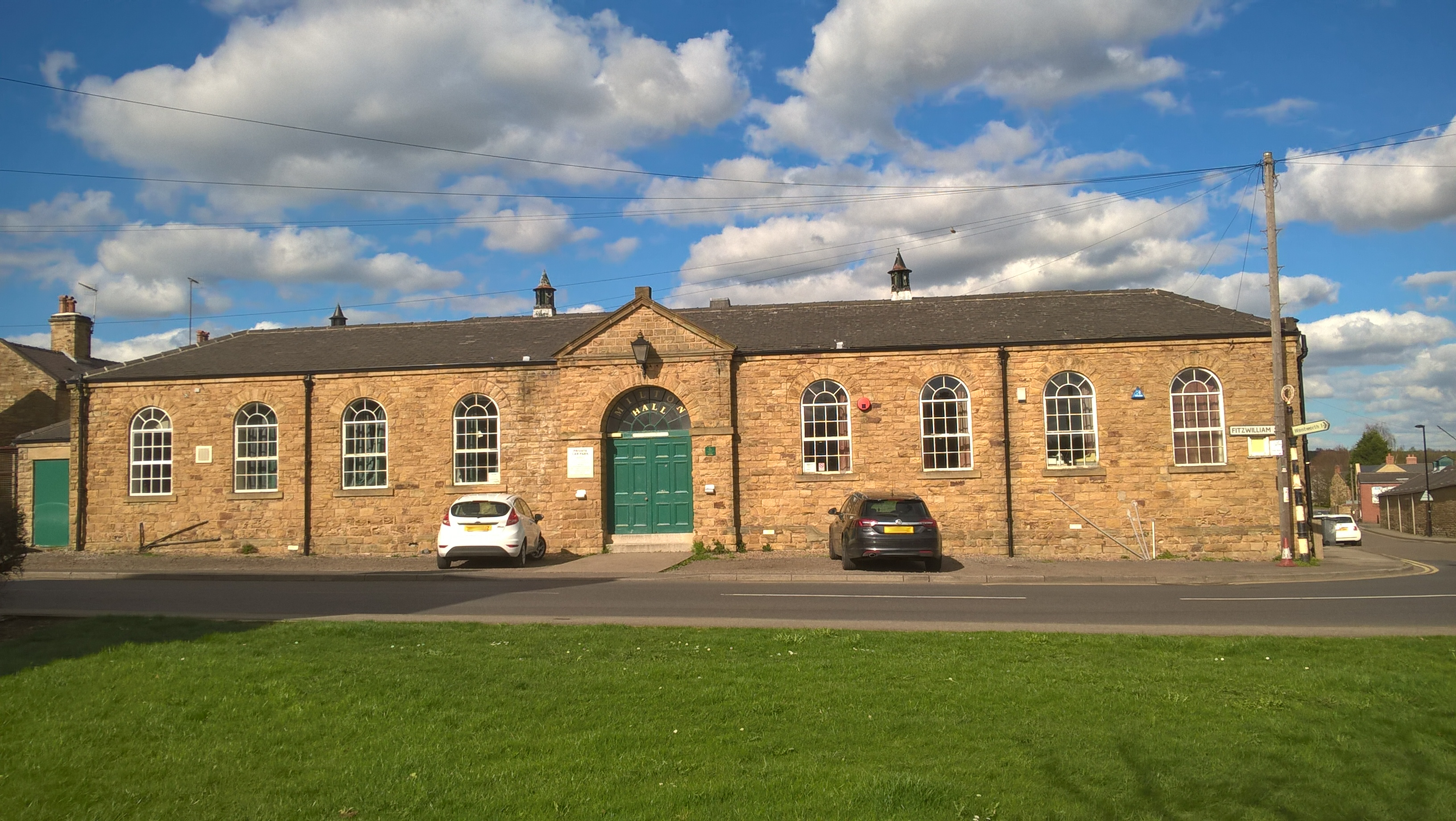
Milton Hall Community Centre (1870)

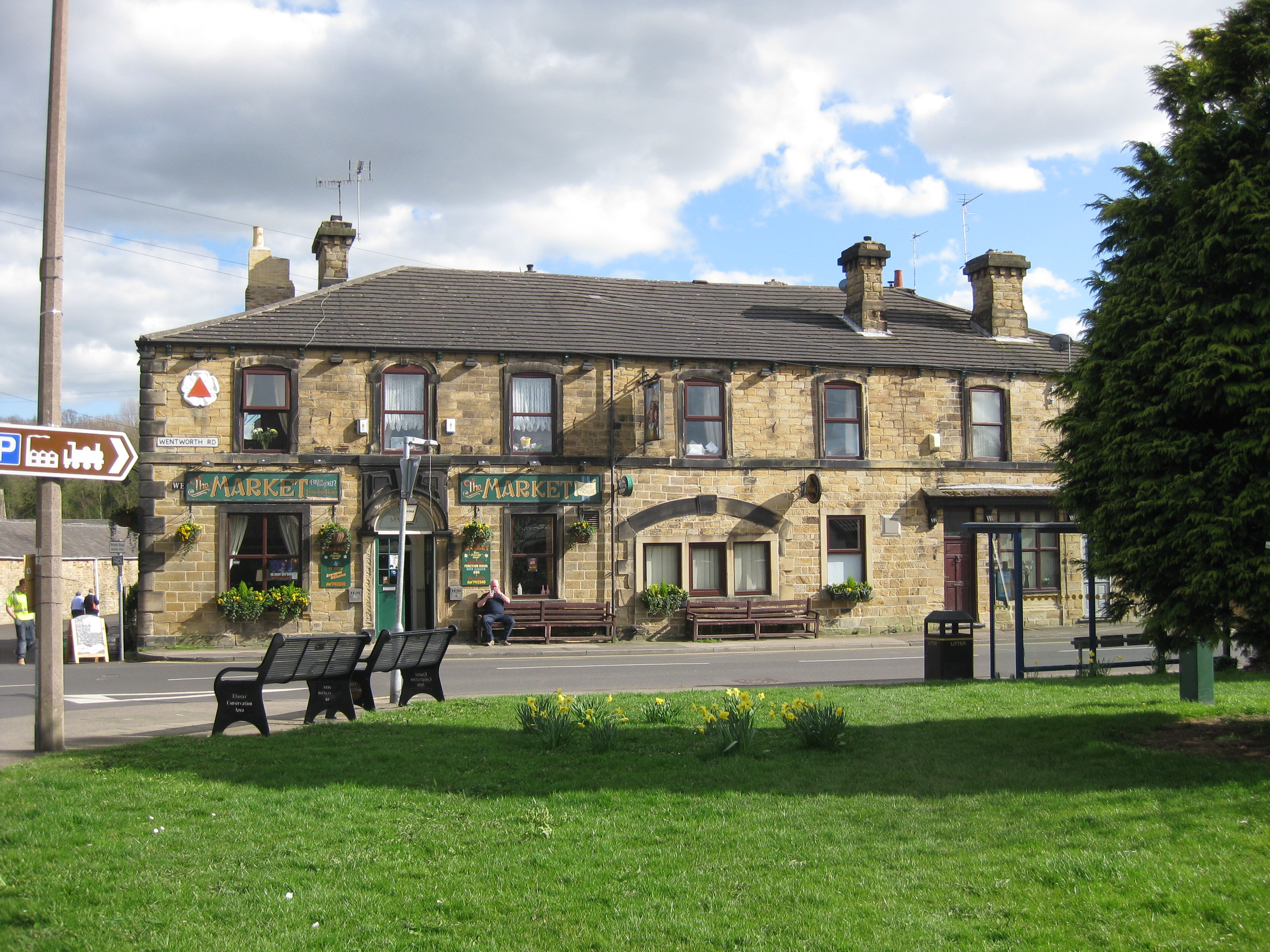
The Market Inn

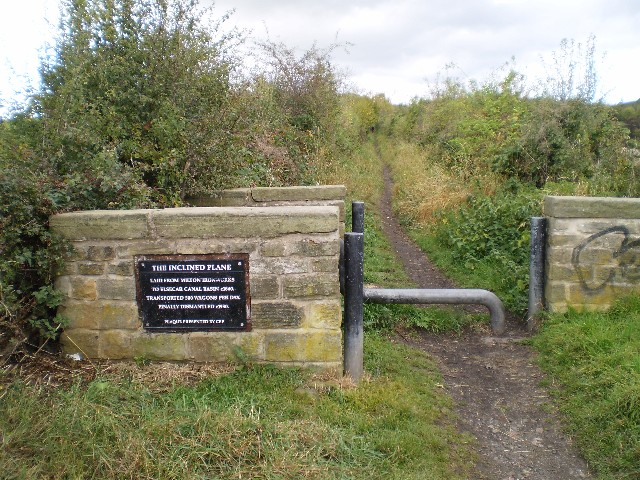
Inclined Plane on the former tramway

== See also ==
- Listed buildings in Hoyland Milton
- Dearne and Dove Canal
- Elsecar Heritage Centre
- Elsecar railway station
- Elsecar Heritage Railway
- Elsecar Collieries
