= List of collieries in Yorkshire (1984–2015) =

In 1984, the Yorkshire area had a total of 56 collieries. The last deep coal mine was Kellingley Colliery which closed on Friday 18 December 2015 signalling the end of deep coal mining not only in Yorkshire but in Britain as a whole.

In 1984, 15 of the collieries were in the Wakefield district, 11 in the Rotherham district, 10 in the Barnsley district, 9 in the Doncaster district, 6 in the Selby district, 3 in the Leeds district and 2 in the Kirklees district. The Yorkshire Area of the Coal Board also included Manton and Shireoaks collieries, which were geographically in Nottinghamshire; they closed in 1994 and 1990 respectively.

Colliery Name	District	Year of closure	Notes
Ackton Hall	Wakefield	1985	at Featherstone
Allerton Bywater	Leeds	1992	
Askern	Doncaster	1991	
Barnburgh	Doncaster	1989	
Barnsley Main	Barnsley	1991	Originally closed in 1966. Reopened to transfer workers from the Barrow pit, which closed in 1985 owing to geological problems. Pit head still stands.
Bentley	Doncaster	1993	
Brodsworth	Doncaster	1990	
Brookhouse	Rotherham	1985	
Bullcliffe Wood	Wakefield	1985	merged with Denby Grange; at Netherton village
Cadeby & Denaby	Doncaster	1986	
Caphouse	Wakefield	1985	merged with Denby Grange. Isolated pit, closest to Overton village. Still "open" as the National Coal Mining Museum for England
Cortonwood	Rotherham	1985	
Darfield	Barnsley	1989	merged with Houghton Main
Dearne Valley	Barnsley	1989	
Denby Grange	Wakefield	1991	at Netherton village
Dinnington	Rotherham	1991	
Dodworth	Barnsley	1987	between 1985-7, only Redbrook shaft operated - known as 'Redbrook Colliery'
Emley, West Yorkshire	Kirklees	1985	
Ferrymoor/Riddings	Wakefield	1985	merged with South Kirkby; located at South Kirkby
Frickley/South Elmsall	Wakefield	1993	
Fryston	Wakefield	1985	
Gascoigne Wood	Selby	2004	part of Selby Coalfield complex, drift mine, exit point for all coal mined in Selby coalfield complex
Glasshoughton	Wakefield	1986	
Goldthorpe	Barnsley	1994	
Grimethorpe	Barnsley	1993	famed for Grimethorpe Colliery Band and setting for film Brassed Off
Hatfield	Doncaster	2015	previously closed in 1993, 2001 and 2004
Hickleton Main	Barnsley	1986	at Thurnscoe village. Merged with Goldthorpe
Highgate Colliery	Barnsley	1985	Merged with Goldthorpe in 1968
Houghton Main	Barnsley	1993	see Little Houghton and Great Houghton
Kellingley	Selby/Wakefield	2015	Last deep mine in the UK. Last colliery in Yorkshire, nearby Hatfield closed mid 2015.
Kilnhurst	Rotherham	1989	
Kinsley	Wakefield	1986	
Kiveton Park	Rotherham	1994	
Ledston Luck	Leeds	1986	
Maltby	Rotherham	2013	
Manvers Main	Rotherham	1988	
Markham Main	Doncaster	1996	originally closed 1992, reopened 1994. There was also a colliery just called 'Markham', which is in Derbyshire
North Gawber	Barnsley	1985	merged with Woolley
North Selby	Selby	1997	part of Selby Coalfield complex
Nostell	Wakefield	1987	
Park Mill	Kirklees	1989	at Clayton West village
Prince of Wales	Wakefield	2002	at Pontefract
Riccall	Selby	2004	part of Selby Coalfield complex
Rossington	Doncaster	2007	
Royston	Barnsley	1989	
Savile	Leeds	1985	at Methley. Often confused with the Savile & Shawcross colliery, which had closed in 1968
Sharlston	Wakefield	1993	
Silverwood	Rotherham	1994	merged with Maltby
South Kirkby	Wakefield	1988	
Stillingfleet	Selby	2004	part of Selby Coalfield complex
Thurcroft	Rotherham	1991	
Treeton	Rotherham	1991	
Wath	Rotherham	1986	merged with Manvers
Wheldale	Wakefield	1987	
Whitemoor	Selby	1996	part of Selby Coalfield complex
Wistow	Selby	2004	part of Selby Coalfield complex
Woolley	Wakefield	1987	
Yorkshire Main	Doncaster	1985	in Edlington village
