= A6195 road =

Road in South Yorkshire, England

A6195

Route information
- Length: 10 mi (16 km)

Major junctions
- From: Tankersley, South Yorkshire
- M1, J36, (Sheffield, Barnsley A61, Chapeltown, Sheffield A6135)
- To: Shafton

Location
- Country: United Kingdom
- Primary destinations: Grimethorpe, Darfield, Brampton Bierlow, Hoyland

Road network
- Roads in the United Kingdom; Motorways; A and B road zones

The A6195 road runs through the Dearne Valley in South Yorkshire, England.

== History ==
The road is mainly newly constructed, being built to regenerate the former coal-mining areas of Barnsley in the late 1990s. It has many at-grade roundabouts, and no grade-separated junctions. It is not so much a through-route, but for local access. A lot of the road, often at junctions, looks half-finished. Most of it looks like a spine access road on a typical industrial estate.

The area was given Enterprise Zone status in the mid-1990s.

=== Construction ===
The Dearne Towns Link Road (the dual-carriageway section) was officially opened on Monday 12 October 1998 by Richard Caborn, Minister for the Environment. It was built by AMEC Civil Engineering Ltd and VHE. It cost £30m. The route was planned by Barnsley Metropolitan Borough Council.

Work started on the Little Houghton and Grimethorpe section in mid-2002. The A628 Shafton bypass opened on 30 October 2003.

== Route ==
=== Dual-carriageway ===
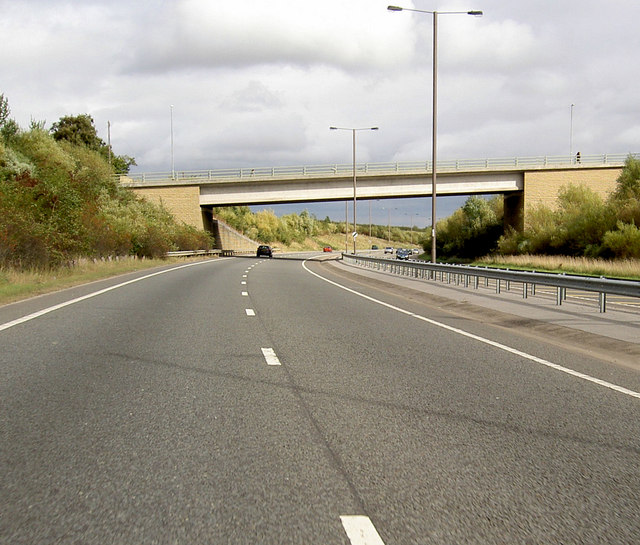
Near Jump and Blacker in September 2007

This section is known as the Dearne Link or the Dearne Towns Link Road. The dual-carriageway section consisted of Stage 1 and Stage 2A/B.

The route starts as a dual-carriageway at junction 36 (Tankersley Interchange) of the M1, next to the Birdwell Roundabout with the A61 (for Sheffield, to the south-west), and A6135 (for Hoyland and Rotherham, to the south-east) in Barnsley Borough. The road is not a trunk road. After around barely 300 metres there is the Rockingham Roundabout near Birdwell, with one newly constructed exit; blossoming industry (economic redevelopment) is hoped to find its way to South Yorkshire one day; there is the KFC Rockingham. Near Upper Hoyland, to the east, there is the Shortwood Roundabout (Shortwood Business Park). At Platts Common, there is the Platts Common Roundabout for the B6096, and Euramax Solutions (uPVC windows). At Roebuck Hill, it crosses the former Hoyland-Wombwell road (B6096) with two closely situated roundabouts; the (second) Roebuck Hill Roundabout gives access to Jump, South Yorkshire. This section to the east bypasses Wombwell, to the south. It crosses the railway, and the Hemingfield Road Roundabout gives access to Wombwell railway station, to the north, and Hemingfield, to the south. Near Brampton (Rotherham), there is the Cortonwood Roundabout for the Cortonwood Retail Park (a Morrisons, in Rotherham borough), where it crosses the Barnsley Boundary Walk next to the Elsecar Canal and runs alongside the Rotherham boundary and the Trans Pennine Trail. It passes under the A6089 and meets the A633 at the Wath Road Roundabout, where the road becomes single-carriageway; nearby is Sematic Group (lift doors) and Cranswick Convenience Foods on the Valley Park Industrial Estate, and the Meadows Brewers Fayre and Barnsley Dearne Valley Premier Inn. The Dearne Valley Parkway, the dual-carriageway from the M1, finishes here.

=== Single-carriageway ===
This section is known as the Wath Link, Dearne Valley Coalfields Link Road or Barnsley Coalfields Link Road.

At Dearne Ings, the Broomhill Roundabout meets the A633 (to the south-east and eventually to the site of the former Manvers Main Colliery, and Dearne Valley College on the A6023), with access to Broomhill to the north. It crosses the Dearne Way and River Dearne at Billingley, meeting the A635 at the Cathill Roundabout. The road follows the former B6273 to the Rotherham Road Roundabout, for Middlecliffe to the north, with the main road taking the exit to the west, at Little Houghton, following the River Dearne to the east. After a mile to the north, the Houghton Main Colliery Roundabout has the large ASOS.com national distribution centre (NDC) built on a former pit, near a wind farm to the north. The Grimethorpe Colliery Roundabout at the southern end of Grimethorpe, at an industrial park where Carlton Brick have their Carlton Main Brickworks to the east and Symphony Group make furniture and kitchens in a large factory to the west. The Leggett & Platt furniture factory is to the east of the Grimethorpe bypass. The Ferry Moor Roundabout, to the north, gives access to Grimethorpe, to the east, and the Sash UK site. In the south of Shafton, it meets the A628 at the Engine Lane Roundabout, with access to Outwood Academy Shafton (former Shafton Advanced Learning Centre) on the Shafton Two Gates Bypass.

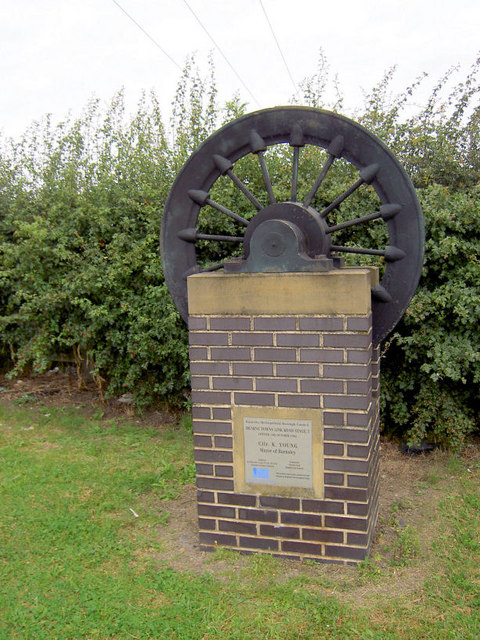
Monument to its opening near the Billingley A635 roundabout)

== See also ==
- Brassed Off
- Earth Centre, Doncaster, built around the same time, off the A6023 on the former Denaby Main pit
- South Yorkshire Coalfield
