= Acton Hall =

Acton Hall can refer to:

- Acton Hall, Wrexham
- Ackton Hall Colliery, Featherstone
