= Grimethorpe =

Village in South Yorkshire, England

Coordinates: 53.57°N 1.38°W

- Village
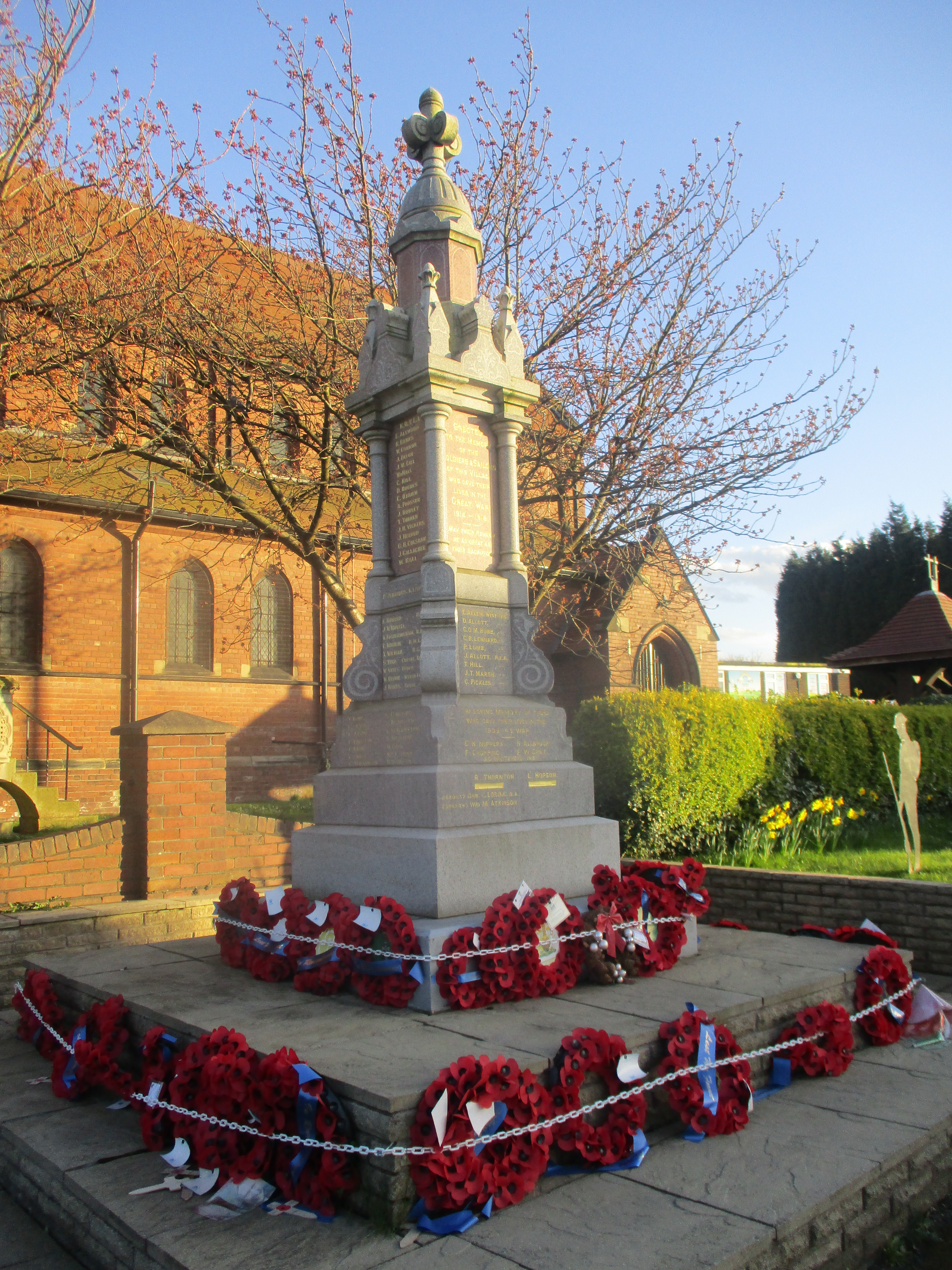
- The War Memorial

- Location within South Yorkshire
- Population: 4,672 (2011 census)
- Metropolitan borough: Barnsley
- Metropolitan county: South Yorkshire
- Region: Yorkshire and the Humber
- Country: England
- Sovereign state: United Kingdom
- Post town: Barnsley
- Postcode district: S72
- Dialling code: 01226
- Police: South Yorkshire
- Fire: South Yorkshire
- Ambulance: Yorkshire
- UK Parliament: Barnsley North

Grimethorpe is a village in the metropolitan borough of Barnsley in South Yorkshire, England. As of the 2011 census it has a population of 4,672. Grimethorpe is located in eastern Barnsley, and until the local government reorganisation of 1974, it was part of the Hemsworth district and constituency. The village is part of the North East ward of Barnsley Metropolitan Borough Council.

For much of the 20th century Grimethorpe's economy was rooted in coal mining. Since the 1984–85 miners' strike, the downscaling of UK coal mining greatly accelerated and international cheap open-pit mining provoked closure of its colliery in May 1993. In 1994 it was regarded as the poorest village in Britain.

There are roads linking the village to some of the country's biggest arteries, and the village is home to approximately 51 businesses, including the online fashion retailer ASOS.

== History ==
The name Grimethorpe originates from "Grim's Torp", a mixture of Anglo-Saxon and Viking names, meaning a torp or hamlet owned by a Viking named Grimey. Grimethorpe is at the foot of the hill upon which is the village of Brierley. In fact, Grimethorpe was named such as a Norse farm built close to Brierley village. Following the Norman Conquest, the Brierley-Grimethorpe area came under the rule of the De Laceys of Pontefract. In 1066, the village's owner was Ernui who was said to have six carucates of land at Brerelia and Hindelia, valued at forty shillings. (A carucate was as much land as could be ploughed in one year by one plough and eight oxen. An acre was as much land as could be ploughed in one day by one plough and a pair of oxen.)

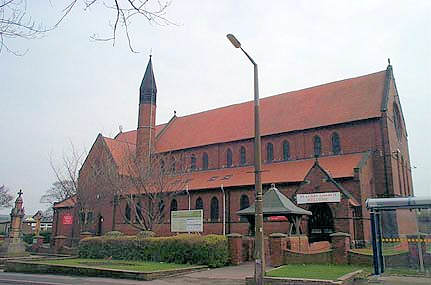
St Luke's Church, the village's local church.

This land was given after the Norman conquest to Airic who was given the whole of Staincross wapentake by Ilbert de Lacey, the Norman of Pontefract. All of Yorkshire was divided into wapentakes, Staincross being the one for the Barnsley area. It was about ten miles from north to south and about twenty miles from east to west, its boundaries being in the northeast the high ridge on which Brierley stands and in the south-west, the watershed of the Pennines. A stone cross called Ladycross was erected near Grimethorpe by the monks of Monk Bretton Priory as a place of sanctuary, there being an old law protecting people on Church lands. The Ladycross figures on many deeds relating to the priory. The Lady referred to in the place names of Ladycross, Ladywell and Ladywood is probably Mary Magdalene to whom Monk Bretton Priory was dedicated.

On a well-hidden site between Brierley and Grimethorpe stood the fortified Manor of Hall Steads (the name means 'hall site'), which belonged to the early Brearley estate. Hall Steads is not mentioned until 1284 in connection with a later Lord of Brierley Manor. Hall Steads was surrounded first by a high, stone wall and then by a moat. The site covered an area of approximately five acres. The building was mainly of local sandstone and many of the stones can still be seen in the soil. Fragments of 14th and 15th-century pottery have been found amongst these stones.

== Mining ==
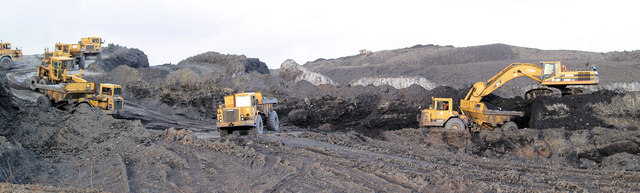
Remediation of a slag heap in 2006; left from Grimethorpe's mining days.

The 1981 census recorded that 44% of all workers in Grimethorpe were miners. The two pits in the village were 'Grimethorpe' and 'Ferrymoor' which merged with 'Riddings' in 1967, which in turn merged with 'South Kirkby' in 1985. Grimethorpe colliery was one of the deepest pits in Britain and, following similar mergers with 'Houghton Main' and 'Dearne Valley', employed 6,000 men at the time of its closure in May 1993. During mid-October of the 1984–85 miners' strike, there was a series of riots in Grimethorpe and local residents complained that the policing was too heavy-handed. Relations between the community and the police remained cold for the next decade.

St Luke's Church was built in 1904 after St Paul's Church, the church of Brierley, was deemed insufficient to accommodate the village's growing population.

== Deprivation ==
After the closure of the mines and other local industries, Grimethorpe entered a period of decline. Unemployment was above 50% for much of the 1990s. Long-term deprivation was identified by local social workers, the public sector, and charities by the 2000s. This sparked a period of regeneration and much of the denser basic housing was demolished and replaced with new housing stock.

Historically Grimethorpe had road links to the major compass points without natural barriers but was distant to major cities and its public transport was represented by long-distance bus routes; comparable ex-mining-centric villages in West Yorkshire such as Fitzwilliam and South Elmsall have rail links to Leeds and a greater population supporting local retail and commerce.

== Regeneration projects ==
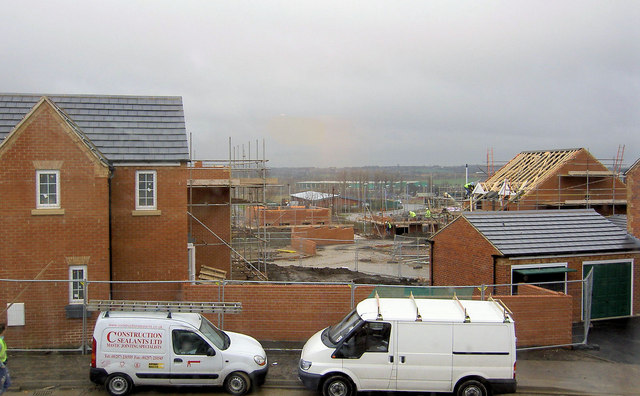
New private housing being built in Grimethorpe as part of its regeneration in 2005.

Several regeneration projects have taken place in the village over the years. The Dearne Valley link roads have been constructed and Park Springs Industrial Estate has been developed. This has brought many jobs to the area especially the construction of a huge unit occupied by South Yorkshire-based furniture company Symphony. The ex-regional NCB Offices have been converted into managed workshops and offices for small businesses and named 'The Acorn Centre', The largest employer on site is Honest Home Care Ltd which employs over 40 people. The village has seen the construction of four private housing estates, a medical centre, a dental surgery, and a village hall. Regeneration was praised by former Deputy prime minister John Prescott on his visit to the village in March 2010.

Since this time regeneration work has continued with the opening of the large ASOS distribution centre, and many other industrial units on the Park Springs Industrial Estate.

== Education ==
The village has two primary schools, Milefield and Ladywood. The village also used to have a secondary school, Willowgarth High School, but it was demolished and replaced with the larger Outwood Academy Shafton, the main secondary school for Grimethorpe, Shafton, Brierley, Cudworth, Monk Bretton, and Lundwood.

The village used to have another school, Springvale Primary School, which burned down in the 1980s. It was replaced with the aforementioned Milefield.

== Band ==
Grimethorpe is known for its past as a mining village, its brass band, the Grimethorpe Colliery Band, and its use as the location for the film Brassed Off – a black comedy which tells the plight of the village and the effect on its band. In 2010 Grimethorpe Colliery band recorded a version of the hymn "Jerusalem" which was played when the English team won a gold medal at the 2010 Commonwealth Games in India.

== Sport ==
Grimethorpe previously had two senior football clubs – Grimethorpe Athletic and Grimethorpe Miners' Welfare.

In 2018 former Barnsley FC player Bruce Dyer opened a branch of his 'love life' football academy in the village.

In the Viz comic strip Billy the Fish, the fictional Grimethorpe City is the arch-rival of Fish's team Fulchester United.

== See also ==
- Listed buildings in Brierley and Grimethorpe
