= Lundwood =

Village in South Yorkshire, England

Coordinates: 53.55°N 1.44°W

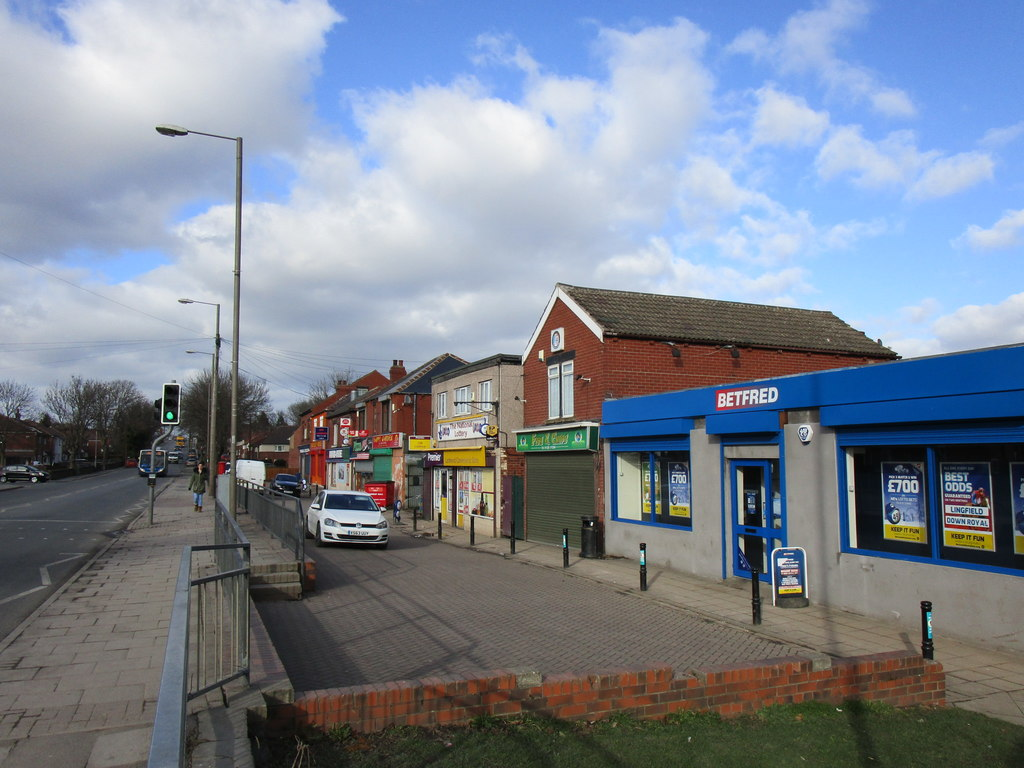
- Pontefract Road

- Location within South Yorkshire
- OS grid reference: SK5198
- Metropolitan borough: Barnsley
- Metropolitan county: South Yorkshire
- Region: Yorkshire and the Humber
- Country: England
- Sovereign state: United Kingdom
- Post town: BARNSLEY
- Postcode district: S71
- Dialling code: 01226
- Police: South Yorkshire
- Fire: South Yorkshire
- Ambulance: Yorkshire
- UK Parliament: Barnsley North

Lundwood is a village in Barnsley in South Yorkshire, England.

== History ==
Lying about three miles east-north-east of Barnsley town centre, Lundwood takes its name from the Lund Wood, the substantially wooded portion of the area of the old manor of Monk Bretton (or Burton). The name Lund is derived from the Old-Norse Lundr, meaning woodland, sometimes of sacred woodland, but usually of economically important woods. The name Lundwood is therefore a tautology (meaning Wood wood), a common feature of place-names where two languages are combined as in this case.

The Lund Wood was entirely within the old manor of Monk Bretton. The wood itself was still significant even in the nineteenth century and covered much of the land bounding Cudworth in the east almost down to the River Dearne near Storrs Wood. The ruins of Monk Bretton Priory which was founded in 1154 as the Priory of St Mary Magdalene of Lund by Adam FitzSwaine lie within modern day Lundwood near Cundy Cross. The road from the Priory ran towards the village of Monk Bretton by way of the hamlet of Littleworth. Littleworth is now subsumed within Lundwood but is remembered in the old road which is named Littleworth Lane, and also in the name of the local primary school.

The development of Lundwood as it is seen today was the result of the building of the turnpike road from Barnsley to Cudworth Bridge in 1825. The Act tells us in its preamble that the turnpike followed the old Barnsley to Pontefract road, inferring that the road was established and merely taken over by the turnpike trust. However, section 31 of the Act refers to "the making of this new piece of road" and authorises the trust to stop up "old roads and footways in the township of Monk Bretton, otherwise Burton" because they had become unnecessary and useless. Maps that were made just a relatively short time before, such as Thomas Jefferys (1771–72, Yorkshire), confirm that the road through Lundwood that we see today did not exist, and neither did the road through Beaver's Hole, so this "new piece" was quite extensive. The old road ran from Barnsley across the Dearne at Old Mill Lane and then turned east on the Burton Road, passing through Monk Bretton and down to Cudworth at Cudworth Bridge. The route of this new road may well have followed existing footways but nothing large enough to have been recorded on a contemporary map, nor large enough to cope with the intended traffic.

== Amenities ==
In its boundaries it features four schools ranging from nursery to comprehensive. Two public houses, the Lundwood WMC and the Lundwood Hotel, known locally as the "club" (still standing) and the "Top Boozer" (Demolished 2011), respectively. It also features several shops selling everything from clothes to takeaway food. In 2009, the local Community Partnership opened Dress 4 Less as an established social enterprise to create funds to assist in community regeneration

== Schools ==
Littleworth Grange Primary Learning Centre is currently the only primary school in Lundwood. It was built to merge Grange Gate Junior School and Littleworth Infants School into a larger primary school. The building is located on the site of the infants school which was demolished in 2005. The only secondary school in Lundwood was Priory School and Sports College. The school was originally built as a junior school but then was transformed into a secondary school after Grange Gate Junior School (Which was being used as Priory School's canteen) was built. It has won many awards in the world of sport including cross country and football. As of September 2011, the school has merged with another school in Barnsley, Willowgarth High School, creating Shafton Advanced Learning Centre (now Outwood Academy Shafton). The building was renamed as Shafton A.L.C. Lundwood site, but has since been demolished following the January 2012 move to Shafton.

== Recent events ==
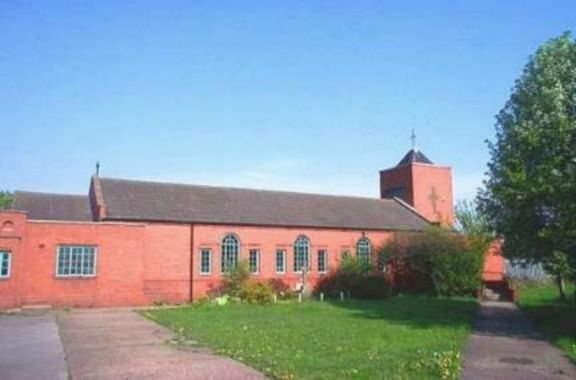
St Mary Magdalene church (2000)

The church at Lundwood, St. Mary Magdalene, featured on the 2005 Channel 4 documentary Priest Idol, which featured an American priest, Father James McCaskill, as he attempted to get the local population back into the rundown church. This was largely a success as his congregation multiplied fourfold. It received a blow when a fire broke out in the church hall as workmen replaced roof felting. The fire destroyed the roof of the hall and gutted the interior. The damage was estimated at £300,000 by insurers. The remnants of the old hall were demolished to allow for a new building. A new church hall was built in 2012. In 2009, Father James McCaskill decided to take a posting in a parish in Washington D.C. which was also on the verge of closing.
