= Tankersley, South Yorkshire =

Village and civil parish in South Yorkshire, England

Coordinates: 53.490°N 1.487°W

Tankersley
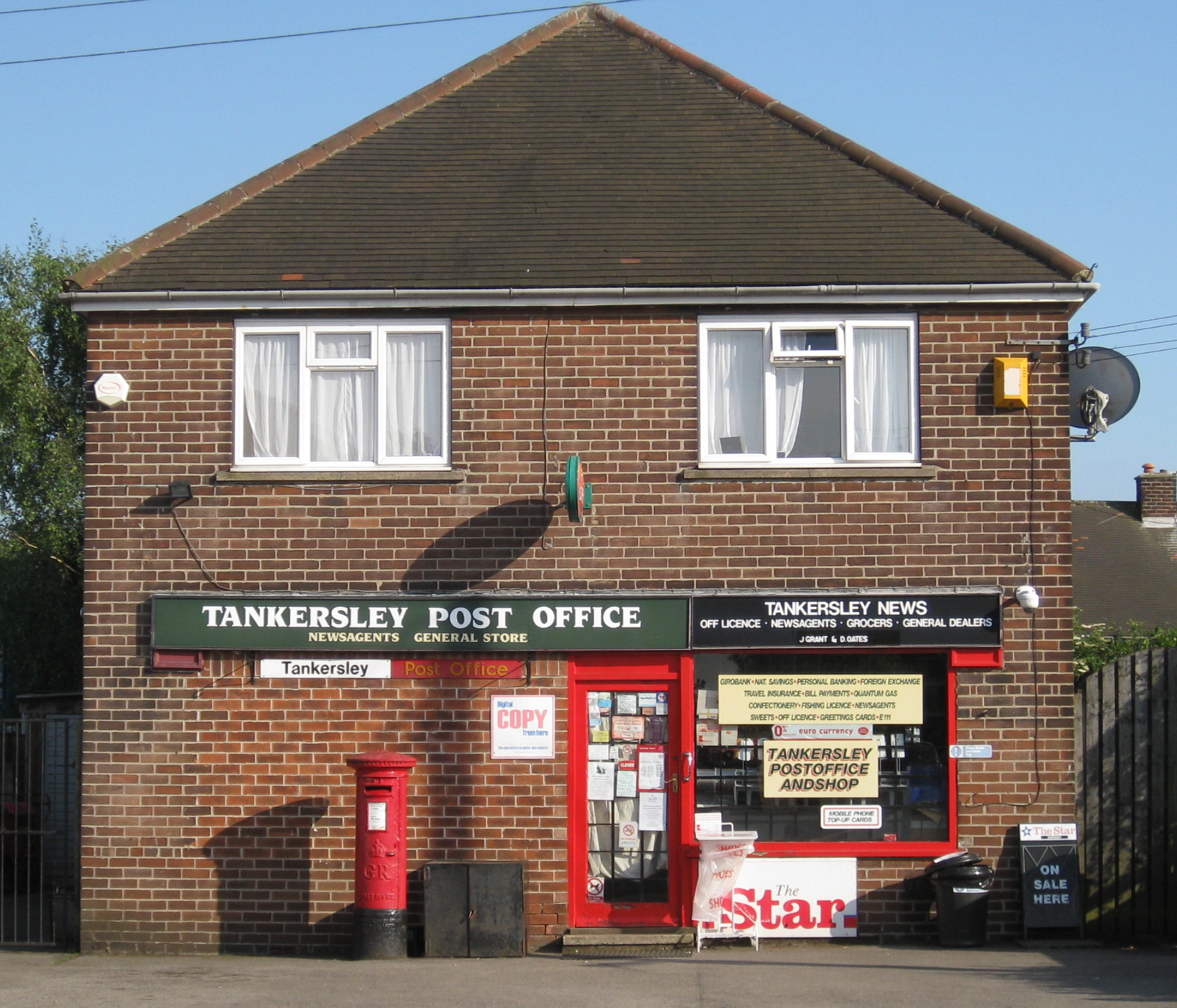
- Tankersley Post Office, Pilley.

- Location within South Yorkshire
- Population: 1,671 (2011)
- Metropolitan borough: Barnsley
- Metropolitan county: South Yorkshire
- Region: Yorkshire and the Humber
- Country: England
- Sovereign state: United Kingdom
- Post town: BARNSLEY
- Postcode district: S75
- Dialling code: 01226
- Police: South Yorkshire
- Fire: South Yorkshire
- Ambulance: Yorkshire
- UK Parliament: Penistone and Stocksbridge

Tankersley is a village and civil parish in the Metropolitan Borough of Barnsley in South Yorkshire, England. At the 2001 census it had a population of 1,414, increasing to 1,671 at the 2011 Census.

The village is to the west of junction 36 of the M1 motorway and north of the A61 road. The parish church of St Peter is to the south of the A61, as is Tankersley Manor, now a hotel. The nave and chancel of the church are 14th century. the tower 16th century, and the interior mainly 19th century. It has a stained glass window designed by Edward Burne-Jones. It was traditional practice for young people to join hands and form a ring around the church in a ceremony called "Embracing the Church".

The parish also includes the village of Pilley to the north and the Wentworth Park Industrial Estate to the west of Tankersley village. Tankersley Post Office is part of a general store in Pilley.

It was the site of a battle in the English Civil War 1643.

Tankersley has been represented in the FA Cup by two football clubs over the years - Tankersley F.C. and Tankersley United F.C.

Etymologically speaking, Tankersley is derived from the Old English words meaning 'Tancred's clearing'.

== Geography ==
The Tankersley Interchange (junction 36) has access to the A61 (south-west and north) and to the Dearne Valley Parkway (A6195 road) to the east. The M1 reached Tankersley on Wednesday 12 June 1968, when a six-mile section from Tinsley was opened.

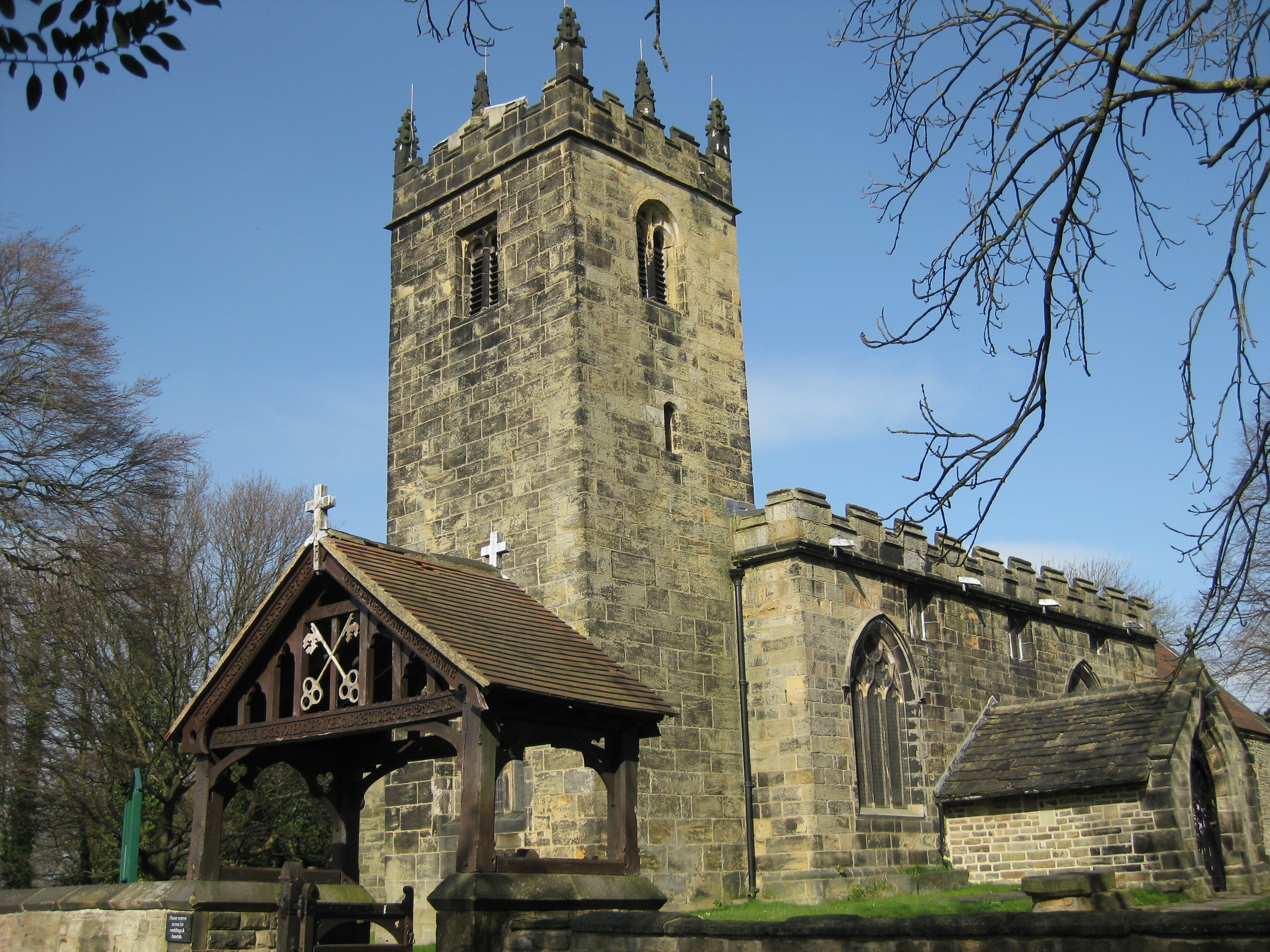
St Peter's Church

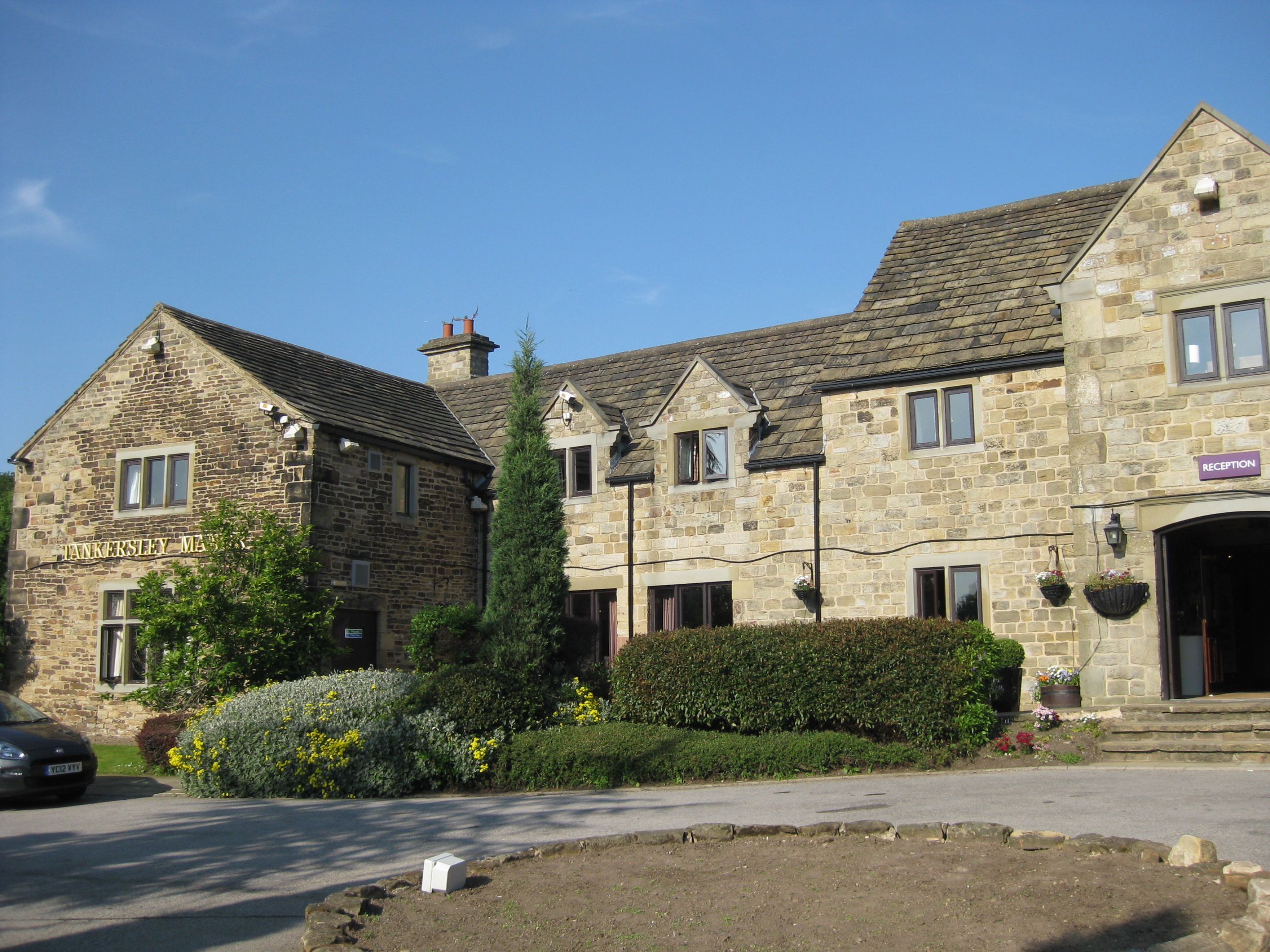
Tankersley Manor Hotel

== See also ==
- Listed buildings in Tankersley, South Yorkshire
