= Frickley Colliery =

Former coal mine in West Yorkshire, England

Coordinates: 53.596°N 1.273°W

Frickley & South Elmsall Colliery was opened by the Carlton Main Colliery Company Ltd in 1903 in South Elmsall, in Yorkshire, England.

== Frickley & South Elmsall Colliery ==
The first sod was cut on 23 April 1903 of shafts No.1 and No.2 and the Barnsley Bed was hit on 23 May 1905 at a depth of 606 m. Sumps were established at a depth of 624 m in the Dunsil seam. Both shafts were 7 m in diameter and brick lined throughout. South Elmsall Colliery, situated in the same curtilage as Frickley, was sunk during 1920–23 reaching the Shafton seam at a depth of 218 m. This No.3 shaft was 4.26 m in diameter and brick lined throughout.

Despite being located in South Elmsall, the colliery was sunk within the land of Frickley Hall, part of the small Hamlet of Frickley, hence the Frickley name.

The Carlton Main Colliery Company was a model employer with strong views on the welfare of its workers. It built the Warde-Aldam Hospital in 1911 and it's welfare schemes also included a maternity home, medical service, recreation ground, swimming baths and other sports facilities including the formation of Frickley Colliery F.C. later Frickley Athletic F.C. and Frickley Cricket Club, as part of the Frickley Athletic Club.

The Barnsley seam was worked until 1934 by hand-got tub stalls when mechanical conveying was introduced at the coal face. During the next three years the installation of face conveyors was completed almost throughout the whole pit.

The total output was obtained from the Barnsley seam until 1942 when the Dunsil seam was entered in a small area to the south of the shaft piller. Since 1942 further access to the Dunsil has been obtained by means of drifts from the Barnsley level and two further areas to the West and East have been entered to work the Dunsil seam. Coal winding remains at the original Barnsley level.

In 1951 the first prop free, front face with an armoured conveyor installation started up on 101's unit in the East Dunsil area.

In February 1955 it became necessary to start off a face in the East Dunsil on the end cleat of coal and it was considered that such conditions would lend themselves to the use of an Anderton Disc Shearer machine working in conjunction with an armoured conveyor, friction type props and link bar supports.

== Central Power Station ==
The Frickley & South Elmsall Collieries were powered by electricity and the company built in 1925 the "Central Power Station" at Frickley. The 22,500 kilowatt output power station fed a 22,000 volt ring main connected to Grimethorpe, Frickley, Brierley, Ferrymoor and South Elmsall collieries.

== Timeline of Frickley Colliery ==
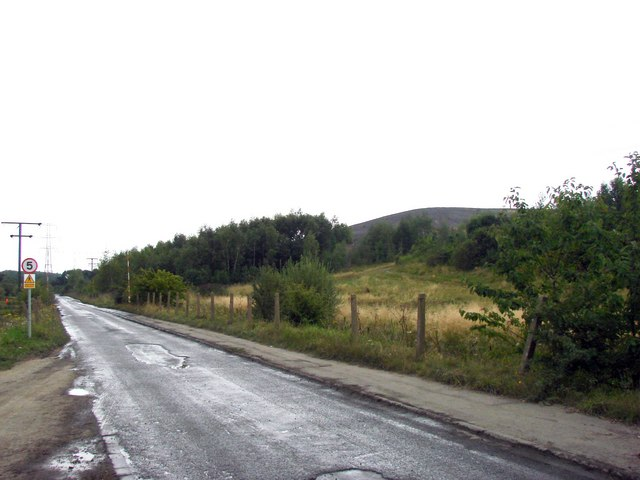
Spoil heaps of Frickley Colliery

- 1905 First Coal Drawn from Barnsley Bed
- 1908 a contract was let by the Swinton and Knottingley Joint Railway to widen the railway between Moorthorpe railway station and the colliery to two running lines.
- 1910 The official date of formation of Frickley Colliery F.C, although research in 2014 proved that the football club existed as early as 1908. The football club was formed as just part of the wider sports offered by Frickley Athletic Club, including Frickley Colliery Cricket Club and the Harriers athletics team.
- 1914 Baum Washery Completed
- 1923 Production commenced in Shafton Seam
- 1925 the Central Power Station was built at Frickley to provide power to both Frickley and nearby collieries.
- 1925 Production ceased in Shafton Seam
- 1927 the output from the Frickley colliery was reported as 23,000 tons of coal a week, and the South Elmsall Colliery 10,000 tons a week. In a share prospectus the company said the life of Frickley was estimated to be over 100 years and South Emsall over 45 years.
- 28 December 1931 – Five colliery deputies died at Frickley after they walked into a pocket of gas. They were part of a party of seven deputies and an overman sent down the pit to carry out a safety inspection following the Christmas shutdown. At the time the colliery would employ between 3,000 and 3,500 men and boys but the pit had not re-opened and only 20 men were underground at the time.
- 24 June 1933 – Following a heavy fall of coal and stone, one man was killed and another injured at Frickley Colliery.
- November 1934 – Following the dismissal of 300 men from Frickley Colliery eight thousand miners employed by the company in Yorkshire threatened to go on strike unless the company extended the work-sharing scheme.
- 1934 Longwall System replaced hand-got tub stalls.
- 23 January 1935 – A lightning strike at Frickley Colliery was called after the company employed a non-local man, although the London Times report that discontent "had been developing since conveyor machinery was installed 18 months ago".
- 12 February 1936 – 2,500 miners walk out on strike over a dispute after a section of conveyors in the east side of the pit were changed, that would reduce the men required to work. A settlement was reached within a few days when the company agreed to the men's demands to re-instate the original system.
- October 1936 – The company encouraged non-union men and boys to join the Yorkshire Mineworkers' Association.
- 15 October 1936 – Three men are buried by a fall of coal on a conveyor unit in the east district.
- 1937 Face conveyors installed in pit
- 28 December 1937 – An underground fitter killed in a fire and six other men treated for fumes, exactly six years to the day that five men were fatally gassed.
- 19 March 1938 Pit Baths Opened
- 1942 Drives made into Dunsil Seam
- 1942 Production recommenced in Shafton Seam
- 14 March 1944 – Due to a number of wage grievances, 3,000 men strike at Frickley Colliery, it is described as one of the biggest pits in Yorkshire.
- 5 August 1946 – Colliery is closed due a strike by pit deputies over sick pay.
- 1 January 1947 Colliery became part of NCB Yorkshire No.5 area.
- 27 August 1947 – Colliery is closed due to the workers going on a sympathy strike in support of action at Grimethorpe colliery four miles away. The sympathy strike also spread to other pits in the area.
- 5 February 1951 – The 3,300 men strike after objecting to a new "price list" for working the Shafton Seam and the transfer of men to other parts of the mine.
- July 1951 – The company tells the four hundred men working the Shafton Seam that they are at risk if production does not improve, it had dropped from an average of 71 cwt for each coal-face worker to 54 cwt since 1949.
- October 1961 – 2,000 workers are laid off for a week after a fire 2,000 feet underground has to be sealed off.
- December 1962 – A man working on a cooling tower at Frickley is killed after falling 40 ft.
- 2 April 1963 – Seven men are injured when two diesel trains collide underground at Frickley Colliery, a runaway coal train hit another carrying 80 miners to the coalface.
- 1965 Colliery became part of Doncaster area.
- 8 June 1966 – An underground explosion in the 2,000 ft Barnsley Seam five miles from shaft caused the evacuation of 500 workers from the pit. Three men suffer burns. Rather than the traditional sealing of the area the National Coal Board successfully tried a new method of fire control by pumping three million gallons of water into the area.
- 1968 Rapid loading bunker for merry go round trains installed-one of the first in country.
- 1968 New main fan installed
- 1968 Frickley and South Elmsall Collieries merge under one manager.
- 1970 Cudworth Seam replaced Shafton Seam.
- 1977 New Baum Washery completed.
- 1984 Top Haigh Moor seam replaced Barnsley Seam.
- 1984–1985 Miners Strike – Frickley becomes known by the motto "second to none" due to so few workers breaking the year-long strike. Following the strike the NCB announced they were reducing the workforce by 400 men from the 1700 employed before the strike.
- 1985 Colliery became part of British Coal South Yorks Area.
- 1986 Dunsil Seam ceased productions.
- 1987 Unofficial strike over the suspension of three mineworkers
- 1990 Colliery became part of North Yorkshire Group
- 1992 Production commenced in Newhill seam.
- 1992 Colliery earmarked for closure, given a temporary reprieve
- 1993 Colliery became part of Northern Group
- 1993 Colliery closed

== Closure ==
In October 1992 Frickley/South Elmsall was one of the 31 collieries intended to be closed by the government. Given a temporary reprieve of just 13 months whilst studies showed the pit was one of the most profitable in British Coal, the miners were forced to vote on closure of the pit in a " No Win" situation in November 1993.

Despite having plentiful and easily accessible reserves, the pit closed on 26 November 1993, leaving massive social and economic problems in the local area.

In its heyday in the 1930s the colliery employed 4000 men and boys and at is closure on 26 November 1993 735 men.

To this day Frickley lives on in many peoples hearts and minds, Frickley Athletic F.C. continue to represent the name nationally at a high level of football, with the Westfield Lane stadium backing onto the former colliery.

== Regeneration ==
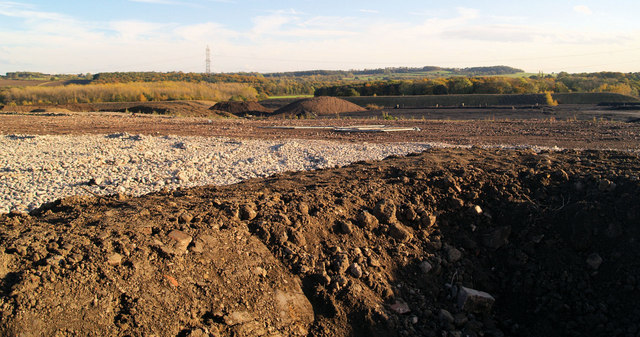
Remediation work at Frickley colliery

In 2005 it was announced the majority of the former colliery will be reclaimed to provide a high quality country park. As part of the scheme, provision will be made to allow the creation of new sport pitches and allotments if required.

On the site of the former pithead up to 160 homes will be built, which will include affordable housing and overall will achieve some of the highest standards for sustainability in the country.

== See also ==
- List of Yorkshire Pits
