= Listed buildings in Tankersley, South Yorkshire =

Tankersley is a civil parish in the metropolitan borough of Barnsley, South Yorkshire, England. The parish contains twelve listed buildings that are recorded in the National Heritage List for England. Of these, one is listed at Grade II*, the middle of the three grades, and the others are at Grade II, the lowest grade. The parish contains the villages of Tankersley and Pilley, and the surrounding area. The listed buildings consist of a church, a sundial and a mounting block in the churchyard, houses, farmhouses and farm buildings, a milepost, and a former coal mines rescue station.

== Key ==
Grade	Criteria
II*	Particularly important buildings of more than special interest
II	Buildings of national importance and special interest

== Buildings ==
Name and location	Photograph	Date	Notes	Grade
St Peter's Church; 53.49182°N 1.47470°W		14th century	The church was later extended, and the north aisle wall was rebuilt in 1881. The church is built in sandstone, and the chancel has a tiled roof. It consists of a nave, a north aisle, a south porch, a chancel with a north organ chamber and vestry, and a west tower. The tower has a northeast stair turret, a three-light west window with a hood mould, round-headed slit windows beneath the bell openings, and an embattled parapet with crocketed pinnacles. The gabled porch has an entrance with an ogee head, medieval stones in the side walls, a doorway with a moulded surround, a sundial dated 1789 in the southwest corner, and iron gates from 1901 designed by Edwin Lutyens.	II*
Tankersley Old Hall; 53.48550°N 1.46413°W		Late 16th century	A ruined mansion, it is in sandstone and without a roof. The major part of what remains is a rectangular tower over two storeys high, with sides of two and three bays. There is a chamfered plinth, a string course, and windows that are mullioned or transomed.	II
Farm building east of Tankersley Farmhouse; 53.48945°N 1.48573°W	—	16th or early 17th century	The farm building is timber framed, it was later encased in stone, and has quoins, and an asbestos sheet roof. There is a single storey and four bays, and the middle two bays are open-fronted with a brick pier.	II
Tankersley Farmhouse, Cottage and farm buildings 53.48956°N 1.48705°W		Late 17th century	The building contains earlier material, and has been converted for other uses. There is some internal timber framing, the exterior is in sandstone and the roof is in stone slate and Welsh slate. It has two storeys, it forms a long range, and at the rear is a double wing. The former house on the left has a chamfered plinth, quoins, three bays, and a doorway with a moulded surround and a keystone. The farm building to the right contains stable doors, and there are casement windows in both parts.	II
Stone Bar Farmhouse, stable and barn 53.49856°N 1.47640°W	—	Early 18th century (probable)	The oldest part is the barn, with the other parts dating from about 1800, and they are in sandstone with stone slate roofs. The house has two storeys and two bays, with the stable under the same roof to the left, and a rear wing. In the house are horizontally-sliding sash windows with lintels grooved as voussoirs, and in the stable are two stable doors, casement windows, and a hatch. The barn is set across at the left end, it is taller, with two storeys, and has quoins, and barn doors with wooden lintels.	II
The Old Manor House; 53.50120°N 1.49775°W	—	Early 18th century	A farmhouse that was extended at both ends, it is in sandstone, with quoins, and a stone slate roof with gable copings on shaped kneelers to the left. There are two storeys, a T-shaped plan, two bays, an extension to the right, and a single-storey addition on the left. Above the doorway is a ledge on brackets, over which is a shaped slab in a recessed square panel. The windows are mullioned. In the right extension are external steps to a doorway, and casement windows.	II
Old Hall Farmhouse and The Cottage; 53.48545°N 1.46447°W	—	c. 1730 (probable)	A combined farmhouse and barn, later two dwellings, the building is in sandstone, with quoins, and a stone slate roof with gable copings on shaped kneelers. There are two storeys, five bays, and a rear wing flanked by lean-tos. In the centre is a segmental-arched wagon entry, now infilled, and on the front are a blocked doorway with a chamfered surround, windows and loading doors. At the rear is a plinth, a sill band, a round-arched wagon entry with an impost band, and a gable with a lunette.	II
Dovecote, Glebe Farm; 53.49381°N 1.47557°W		1735	The dovecote is in sandstone, with quoins, a continuous ledge below the eaves, and a stone slate roof with gable copings on shaped kneelers. There are three storeys, a square plan, and a single bay. On the farmyard front is a segmental arch with a moulded and quoined surround, and a casement window above. At the rear is a doorway and a two-light mullioned window, and in the left return, external steps lead to a doorway with a keystone and a datestone above.	II
Sundial; 53.49162°N 1.47475°W		1745	The sundial is in the churchyard of St Peter's Church. It is in sandstone, and consists of a Tuscan column on a single step on a square platform. There is a square cap and a dated dial.	II
Mounting block 53.49167°N 1.47472°W		Late 18th century (probable)	The mounting block is in the churchyard of St Peter's Church. It is in sandstone, and its plan is that of a keyhole. It consists of five steps leading up to a circular platform with a chamfered edge, overhanging a plinth.	II
Milepost; 53.47604°N 1.45255°W		Early 19th century	The milepost is on the northwest side of the A6135 road, and is in cast iron. It has angled sides, and the top is broken off. On the sides are the distances to Barnsley and Sheffield.	II
Former Coal Mines Rescue Station; 53.50051°N 1.47867°W		1902	The building, later used for other purposes, is in red brick, partly rendered, with a hipped slate roof. There are two storeys, in the left part is a doorway with a fanlight, and a gable with applied half-timbering above, and the windows are casements.	II
