= South Elmsall =

Town and civil parish in West Yorkshire, England

Coordinates: 53.595900°N 1.272603°W

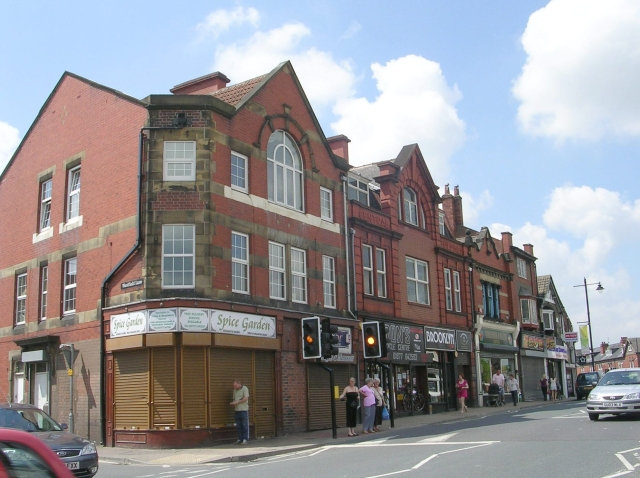
- South Elmsall High street

- Location within West Yorkshire
- Population: 6,519 (2011 census)
- OS grid reference: SE475114
- Civil parish: South Elmsall
- Metropolitan borough: City of Wakefield
- Metropolitan county: West Yorkshire
- Region: Yorkshire and the Humber
- Country: England
- Sovereign state: United Kingdom
- Post town: PONTEFRACT
- Postcode district: WF9
- Dialling code: 01977
- Police: West Yorkshire
- Fire: West Yorkshire
- Ambulance: Yorkshire
- UK Parliament: Normanton and Hemsworth

South Elmsall (/ˈɛmsəl/ EM-səl) is a town and civil parish in the City of Wakefield in West Yorkshire, England. South Elmsall lies to the east of Hemsworth. The town had a population in 2001 of 6,107, increasing to 6,519 at the 2011 Census.

== History ==
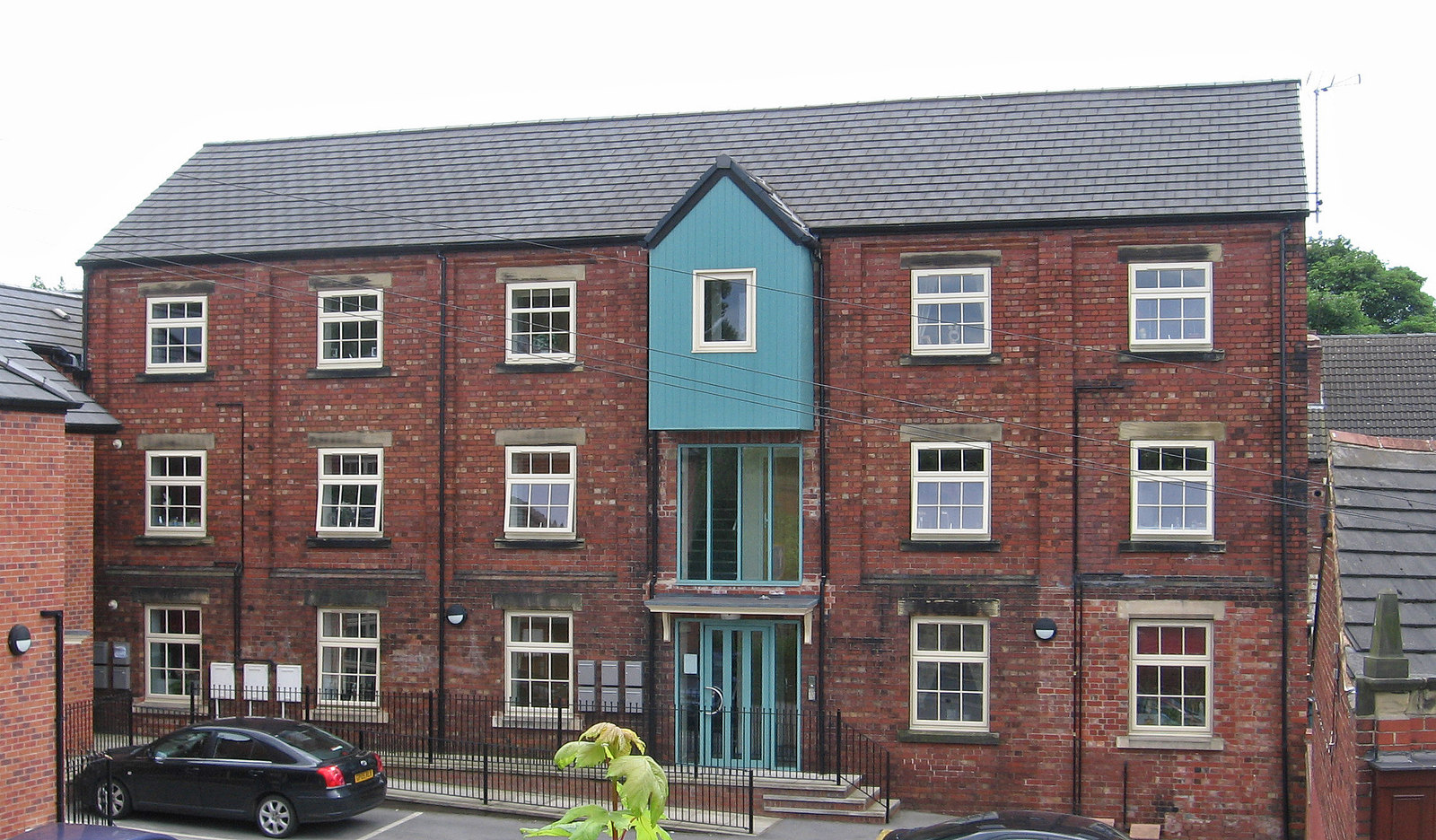
The former mill, now modern housing

The name Elmsall is derived from the Old English elmshalh meaning 'elm nook of land'.

The town was largely a small farming settlement until the industrial revolution and the sinking of collieries caused a boom in population and a need for modern housing for the workforce. This has left a town with a mixture of stone and brick buildings. The town and its neighbours were mentioned in the Domesday Book. Other industries such as quarrying for stone, agriculture and brick manufacture were also known at different periods of the town's history, with many of the former buildings and sites associated with them still existing.

== Former quarry site ==
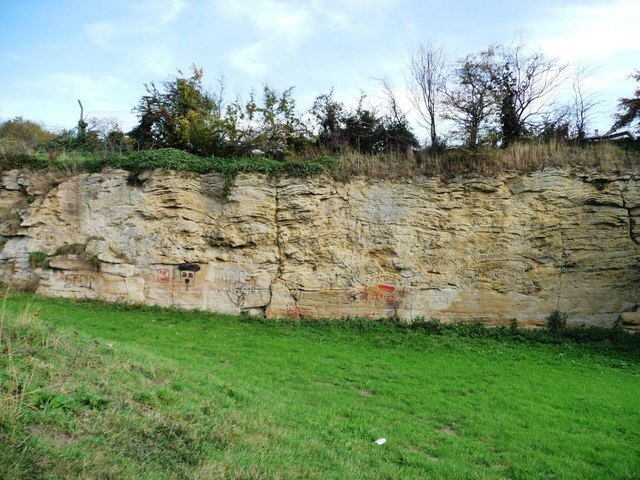
The former quarry, a nationally important site

The former South Elmsall quarry was deemed a site of national importance, by Defra, due to the visible section of an unusually complete patch coral reef.

== Coal mining ==
The town is most famous for its coal-mining past; it was the site of Frickley Colliery, which was one of the largest deep coal mines in the United Kingdom. The colliery invested in several improvements that were of benefit to the area, including the building of the Warde Aldam Hospital, as well as swimming baths and sports facilities.

The colliery became a key source of union radicalism. During the UK miners' strike of 1984–1985, there were numerous disturbances in the area. It was one of the last pits to return to work after the strike, seeing as it was picketed by a group of hardliners from Kent who continued to picket Frickley after the NUM had called off the strike. The Frickley miners refused to cross the hardliners' picket.

The colliery was closed on 26 November 1993 following closures of nearby pits like Ferrymoor-Riddings (1985), Kinsley (1986), South Kirkby (1988) and Grimethorpe (1992). In 1998 the UK Governments "Social Exclusion Unit" published a series of "Policy Action Team" reports looking at issues of social exclusion. The Skills report used South Elmsall and surrounding towns as a case study and stated "The local communities still suffer from serious environmental, social and economic problems - and a crisis of morale - as a result of the loss of jobs in the mining industry".

== Warde-Aldam Hospital ==
The Warde-Aldam Hospital was a hospital situated in South Elmsall, Yorkshire, England. It was built in 1911 by Carlton Main Colliery Ltd and was used as a general, voluntary hospital until 1948. It was then taken over by the NHS and provided acute hospital care until 1978.

== Music ==
The town is home to Carlton Main Frickley Colliery Band, a successful brass band who have been British and European champions.

== Frickley Country Park ==
Frickley Country Park officially opened in September 2009, after a long period of land reclamation, environmental cleaning and landscaping of the former Frickley Colliery site was finished. The site offers walks and play areas as well as space for new housing development as part of the wider regeneration scheme.

== Local economy ==
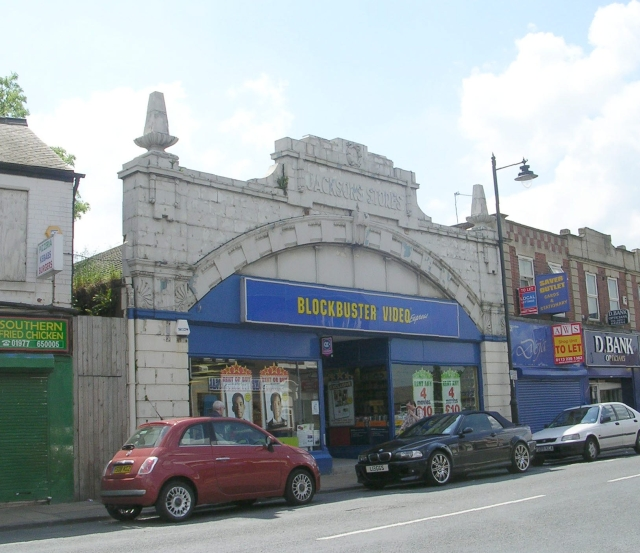
Jackson Stores, Barnsley Road

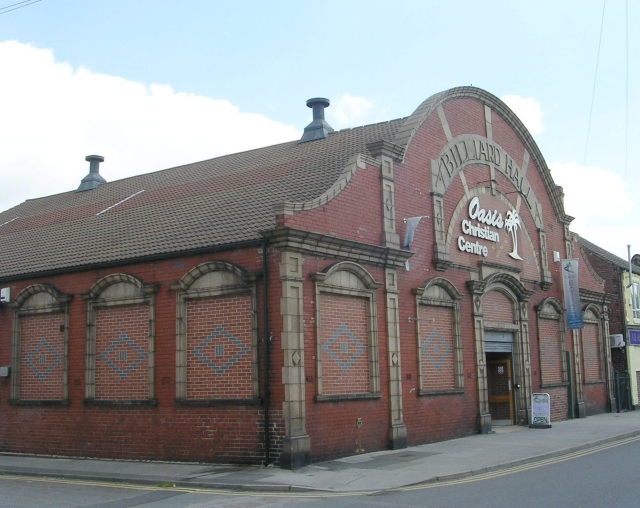
Billiard Hall, Barnsley Road

The large, traditional market is a central feature of the shopping area of the town, with approximately 105 trading stalls. On the main high street there are shops featuring many household names such as The Post Office, Hallmark Cards, Specsavers, Boots Group and Greggs alongside many other independent shops offering a range of goods and services such as travel, boutique fashion, wedding dress hire, sportswear, a flooring and furniture store and much more.

On the outskirts of the town is the Dale Lane Industrial Estate which is home to a number of large, internationally recognised companies. For example, there are a number of Next Distribution warehouses. The estate itself reflects the change in industry of the area, being one of the key expansion areas since the closure of the local collieries.

== Education ==
Carlton, Moorthorpe, Northfield and Ash Grove Academy are the primary education schools in South Elmsall. The main source of secondary and further education in the town is Minsthorpe Community College, which also provides places to residents of South Kirkby and Upton. In 2008 Minsthorpe Community College gained its best ever results at all levels – KS3/GCSE/A-Level, the college GCSE results are higher than the local and national averages.

The school also hosts a number of other facilities such as a sports and fitness suite, all weather floodlit sports pitches, a gym and an upcoming public swimming pool. The school and its science and sporting facilities were upgraded as one of the host training facilities for the London 2012 Olympic Games.

Among a number of well known people who have an association with Minsthorpe include playwright John Godber, actors Adrian Hood and Chris Walker and footballers Jamie and John McCombe.

== Media ==
Local news and television programmes are provided by BBC Yorkshire and ITV Yorkshire. Television signals are received from the Emley Moor TV transmitter.

Local radio stations are BBC Radio Leeds, Heart Yorkshire, Capital Yorkshire, Hits Radio West Yorkshire, Greatest Hits Radio Yorkshire, and 5 Towns FM, a community online radio station that broadcasts from Castleford.

The town is served by local newspaper, Wakefield Express.

In March 2025, filming for the Netflix show Adolescence took place in this town, and neighbouring areas.

== Transport ==
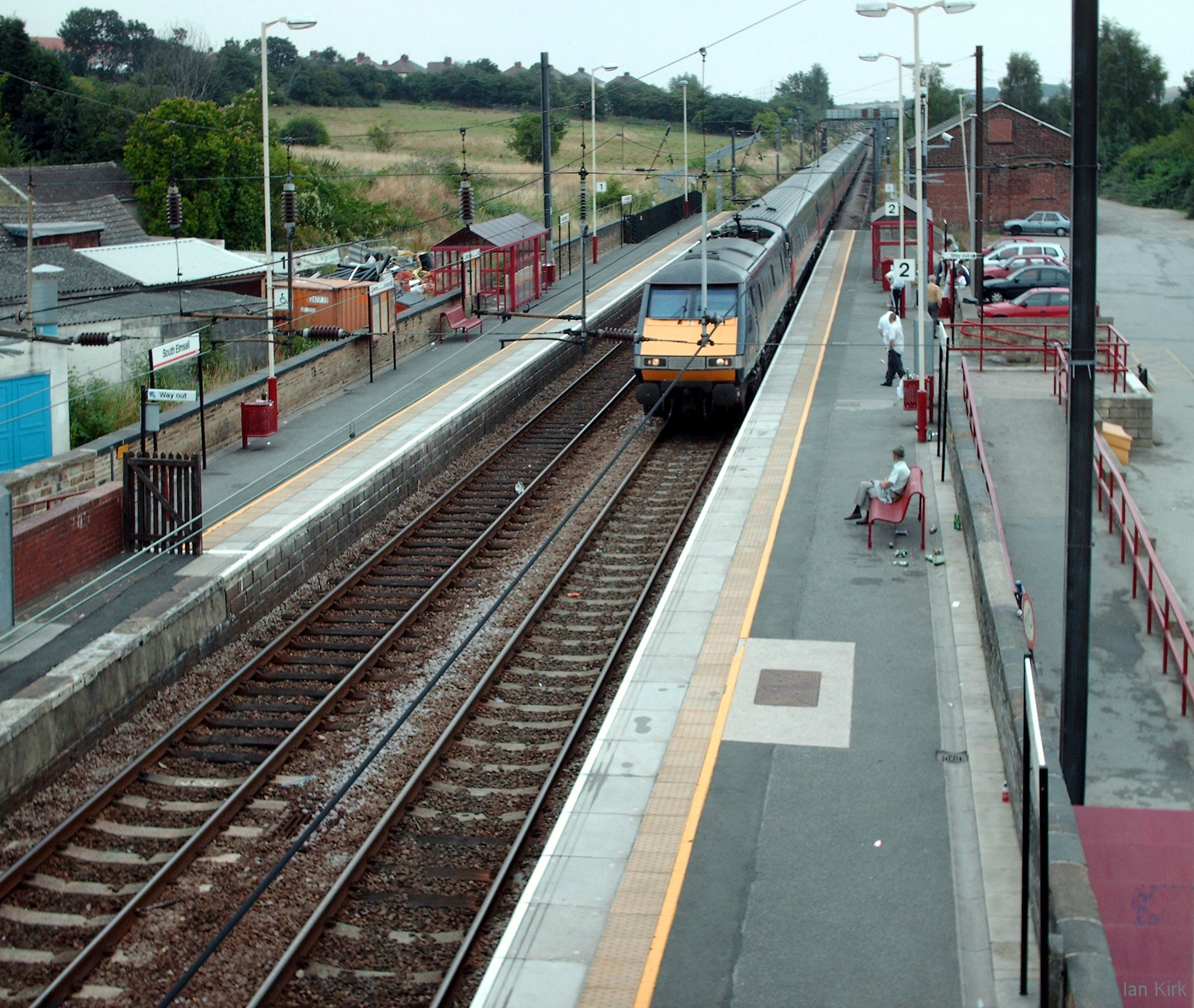
South Elmsall railway station

South Elmsall is served by rail, the nearest station being South Elmsall railway station. The main bus station is also situated beside the railway station.

== Churches ==
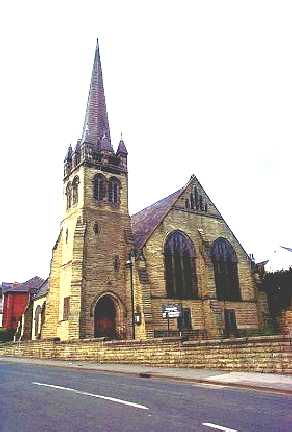
Trinity Methodist Church

The principal places of Christian worship include:

- The Oasis Church (Charismatic)
- St Luke's Church (Evangelical) (formerly Barnsley Road Methodist Church, Aire and Calder Circuit/Leeds District)
- Trinity Methodist Church^{*} (Aire and Calder Circuit/Leeds District),
- St Joseph's Roman Catholic Church^{*} (Diocese of Leeds)
- South Elmsall Parish Church of St Mary-the-Virgin^{*} (Church of England) (Diocese of Leeds),
- New Jerusalem Christian fellowship (Independent Christian Fellowship).
- ^{*}Member of SESKUB Churches Together (SESKUB = South Elmsall, South Kirkby, Upton and Badsworth)

Non-Christian places of religious/spiritual interest:

- South Elmsall Spiritualist Church

== Sports ==
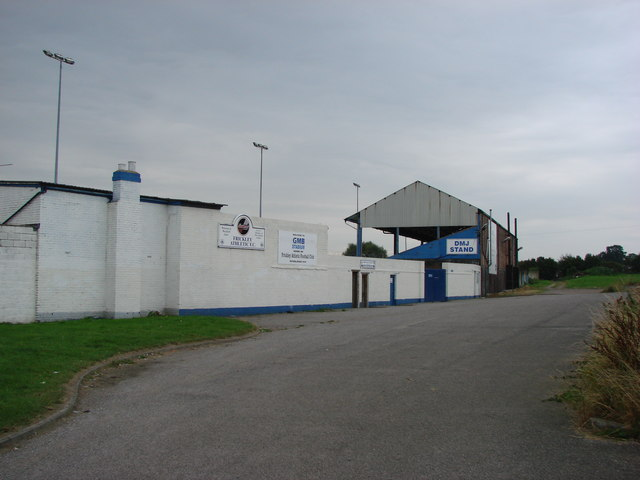
Westfield Lane Stadium

Frickley Athletic are based in South Elmsall. Frickley play their home games at Westfield Lane Stadium.

Other sports clubs include The South Elmsall Social Cycling Club, which was officially founded in 1934.The club was relaunched in 2015 as Elmsall road club and has 90 members.

Minsthorpe Marlins were based at South Elmsall, but were left homeless when the public swimming baths were closed. A new facility has now opened.

== Notable residents ==
- Actor Chris Walker was born in South Elmsall; he is best known for his role as Rob Hollins in the Birmingham-based soap opera Doctors. He won an award at the British Soap Awards in 2010 for his role, with on-screen wife, actress Jan Pearson.
- Boxer Thomas (a.k.a. Tom) Nicholls was born at South Elmsall and lived there before his family moved to Wellington, Shropshire. He competed in the Olympics in 1952 and 1956, winning silver medal in the latter.
- Footballer Peter Swan, winner of 19 England caps, was born in South Elmsall.
- Footballer George Gibson played for South Elmsall-based Frickley Athletic before becoming one of the early English footballers to play abroad.
- Footballer Ronnie Radford, scorer of the famous long-range goal for non-League Hereford United against First-Division Newcastle United in 1972, in one of the F.A.Cup's greatest giant-killing acts, was born in South Elmsall.
- Environmental activist Gail Bradbrook, a co-founder of the environmental social movement Extinction Rebellion, was born here, the daughter of a coal miner from Frickley Colliery.
- English professional pool, snooker and English billiards player Kelly Fisher was born in South Elmsall.

== Twinning ==
South Elmsall is twinned with Wetter (Ruhr), Germany.

== See also ==
- Listed buildings in South Elmsall
