= Pilley, South Yorkshire =

Village in South Yorkshire, England

Coordinates: 53.50007°N 1.48137°W

Pilley
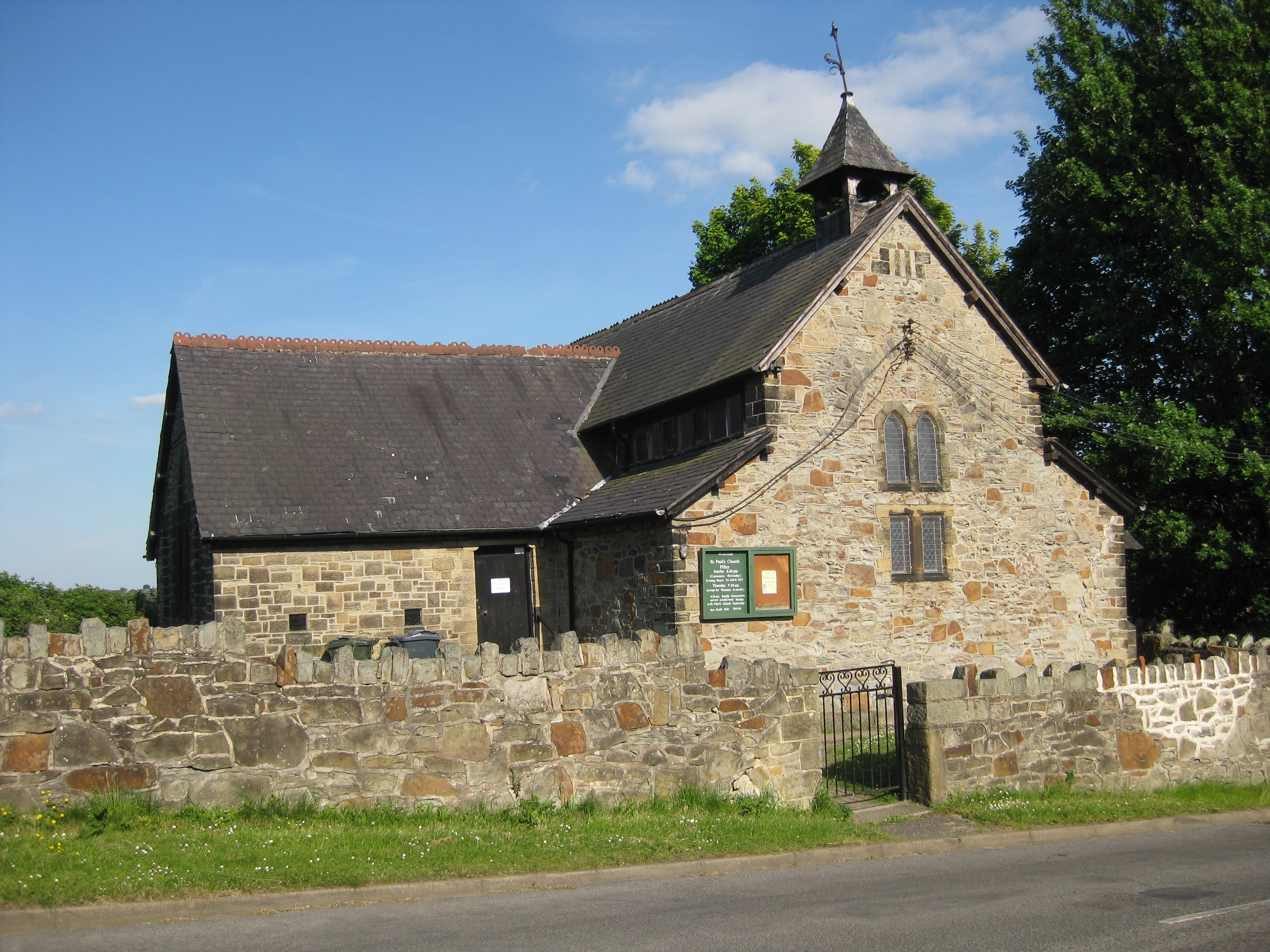
- Church of St Paul, Pilley

- Location within South Yorkshire
- OS grid reference: SE345005
- Civil parish: Tankersley
- Metropolitan borough: Barnsley
- Metropolitan county: South Yorkshire
- Region: Yorkshire and the Humber
- Country: England
- Sovereign state: United Kingdom
- Post town: BARNSLEY
- Postcode district: S75
- Dialling code: 01226
- Police: South Yorkshire
- Fire: South Yorkshire
- Ambulance: Yorkshire
- UK Parliament: Penistone and Stocksbridge

Pilley is a village in the metropolitan borough of Barnsley in South Yorkshire, England.

Pilley is situated to the south of Barnsley and to the west of Junction 36 of the M1 motorway. It is part of the civil parish of Tankersley, and lies close to that village. The general store in Pilley also serves as Tankersley Post Office.

It has a small Church of England church of St Paul and a Wesleyan Methodist chapel dating from 1886.

== See also ==
- Listed buildings in Tankersley, South Yorkshire
