= Oaks Viaduct =

Former railway viaduct in South Yorkshire, England

Coordinates: 53.555°N 1.448°W

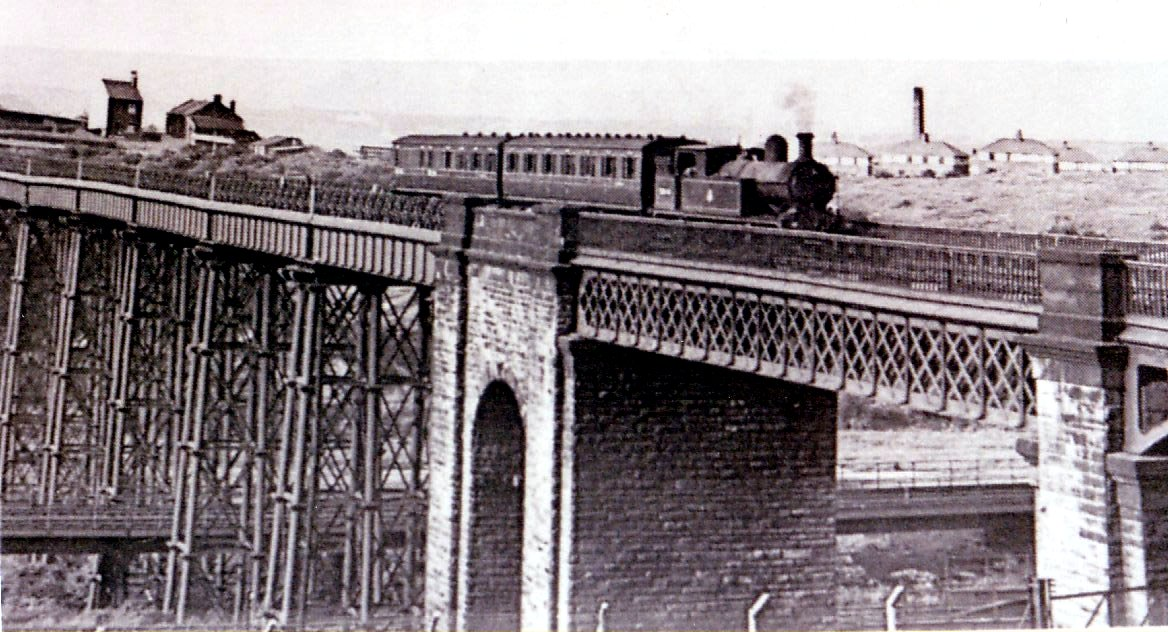
The Barnsley/Cudworth "Pull and Push" crossing the Dearne Valley via the Oaks Viaduct

Oaks Viaduct spanned the Dearne Valley, in South Yorkshire, England. The viaduct was 1,087 feet (331 m) long and crossed Pontefract Road at Hoyle Mill, and spanned the Dearne Valley including the Dearne and Dove Canal and the Barnsley Coal Railway. It carried the Midland Railway's Cudworth-Barnsley branch. It opened to goods traffic in 1869 and to passenger traffic in 1870. On the Barnsley side the line gave access to Barnsley Main Colliery. The line also served Monk Bretton Colliery and a stub at the Cudworth end is still used to deliver sand to Redfearn's Glass Works at Monk Bretton.

The "Cudworth Flyer" local train from Barnsley, connecting with Midland line trains at Cudworth, passed over the viaduct. The service was withdrawn on 6 June 1958, although a goods train from Carlton Yard continued to run until the closure of Court House Goods station.

In 1965, the bridge was deemed unsafe, leading to the withdrawal of all train services and its eventual demolition.

== See also ==
- Barnsley Court House railway station
