= Wath Main Colliery =

Former coal mine in South Yorkshire, England

Coordinates: 53.513°N 1.341°W

Wath Main Colliery was a coal mine situated in the Dearne Valley, close by the township of Wath-upon-Dearne, South Yorkshire, England. The colliery was operated by the Wath Main Coal Company Limited.

Sinking of the first of its two shafts began in 1873, the workings reaching the highly prized Barnsley seam three years later. To gain access to lower reserves the shafts were deepened, first in 1912 to reach the Parkgate seam and then, in 1923, to the Silkstone seam.

The colliery became part of the National Coal Board on nationalization in 1947 and it was amalgamated, along with other local collieries, with the adjacent Manvers Main Colliery on 1 January 1986. Closure came on 25 March 1988.

The site has been reclaimed and now contains Wath Country Park, which in May 2007 was sold off to developers to form a new housing development. The park lasted just 10 years.
