= Priory School and Sports College =

Location
- Littleworth Lane; Lundwood; Barnsley, South Yorkshire, S71 5RG; England
- Coordinates: 53.558790°N 1.442400°W

Information
- Motto: Going Forward Together
- Local authority: Barnsley
- Specialist: Sport
- Headteacher: Bernadette O'Brien
- Gender: Mixed
- Age: 11 to 16
- Enrolment: 900 approx.
- Capacity: 934
- Colours: Black and White

Priory School and Sports College was a comprehensive secondary school in Barnsley, South Yorkshire, England. In September 2011 it merged with Willowgarth High School to form Shafton Advanced Learning Centre (now Outwood Academy Shafton). It served the area including Lundwood, Monk Bretton, Cudworth and Cundy Cross.

The school had a mixed intake of both girls and boys, ages 11–16. It was a state community school, administered by Barnsley Metropolitan Borough Council. At the time of its closure in 2011, Bernadette O'Brien was headteacher.

The school's student body was divided into up to eight form groups in each year, dependent on the number of students in the year group, resembling the name of the school: P, R, I, O, V, Y, S and C.

== School logo ==
The school logo featured a blue forward arrow, on a yellow circular background. It was used frequently and recognised well, featuring on the school uniform.

== The school ==
Priory School and Sports College as of the late 2000s/early 2010s inhabited one central main building and several outer blocks. The school had also recently expanded into the neighbouring former Grange Gate Junior School building, where the canteen was based.

It was proposed for a complete re-build of the school as part of the government's Building Schools for the Future programme, merging with the current Willowgarth High School. The construction of the new merged school is complete, with the merge into the new Shafton ALC premises achieved for January 2012. During September to December 2011, both halves of the new Shafton ALC were operating on their former school sites.

Sports facilities on site included a sports hall, gymnasium, fitness suite, boxing ring, climbing walls, outdoor tennis courts, Astroturf and various sports fields. The school has library and over 50 classrooms, with specialist laboratories and workshops, as well as areas for pupils to go after school.

== Notable former pupils ==
- Darren Gough - Former Cricketer
- Drew Talbot - Footballer
