= Listed buildings in South Elmsall =

South Elmsall is a civil parish in the metropolitan borough of the City of Wakefield, West Yorkshire, England. The parish contains five listed buildings that are recorded in the National Heritage List for England. All the listed buildings are designated at Grade II, the lowest of the three grades, which is applied to "buildings of national importance and special interest". The parish contains the village of South Elmsall and the surrounding area, and the listed buildings consist of three farmhouses, a barn, and a war memorial.

== Buildings ==
Name and location	Photograph	Date	Notes
Hill House and Rock House Farmhouse; 53.59774°N 1.28047°W	—	16th century (probable)	The farmhouse has been extended, altered, and divided into two. It is in sandstone, incorporating earlier timber framing, and has a hipped slate roof. There are three storeys and an L-shaped plan, with a three-bay range, the gable end facing the road, and a single-bay wing to the west. Most of the windows are casements, and there is one two-light mullioned window.
Broad Lane Farm East Farmhouse; 53.58270°N 1.31203°W		Late 17th century	The farmhouse, later a private house, is in sandstone, and has a tile roof with coped gables and kneelers. There are three storeys and an L-shaped plan, with a main range of five bays, and a rear wing at the east end. The main doorway has a moulded surround, a Tudor arch, and a deep lintel. Most of the windows are mullioned, with some mullions missing, most have hood moulds, and there is a stair window at the rear. In the angle with the wing are external steps to a doorway.
Barn west of Broad Lane Farm East Farmhouse; 53.58268°N 1.31241°W	—	Late 17th century (probable)	The barn is in sandstone, with a roof partly of stone slate and partly of pantiles. There are six bays and a rectangular plan. On the south front is a large segmental-arched wagon entry with a chamfered surround, two doorways with chamfered surrounds, a three-light mullioned window, slit vents, an inserted window, and a square loading door, and there are similar openings elsewhere.
Cherry Tree Farmhouse; 53.60109°N 1.26017°W		Late 17th century	The farmhouse, later extended and a private house, is whitewashed and painted, and has a pantile roof. There are two low storeys and two bays. On the front is one casement window, the other windows are sliding sashes, and there is a porch and doorway to the left.
South Elmsall and Moorthorpe War Memorial; 53.59431°N 1.29422°W		1923	Designed by architect Wilfred Bond, of Grantham. The war memorial is by a road junction, and is in the form of a market cross in limestone, on a sandstone base of four hexagonal steps. The shaft of the cross is hexagonal and tapering, embattled at the top, and is surmounted by a floriated cross. On the front is a gableted niche containing a statue of Saint George. The shaft stands on a hexagonal plinth containing plaques in polished black granite engraved with the names of those lost in the two World Wars, and the plaque at the front has an inscription.
