= Barnburgh Main Colliery =

Former coal mine in South Yorkshire, England

Coordinates: 53.535°N 1.282°W

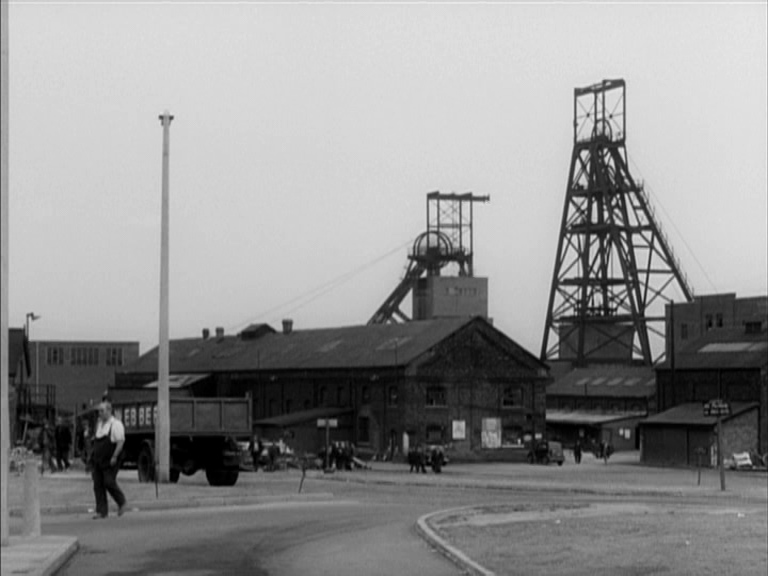
Barnburgh Main Colliery around 1967

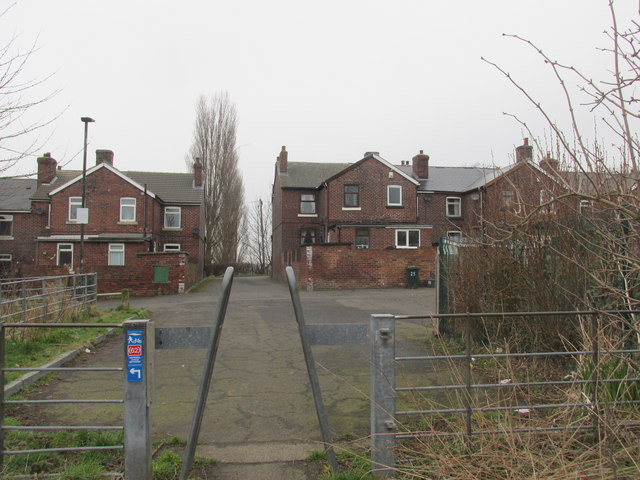
Former miners' cottages of Barnburgh Main Colliery

Barnburgh Main Colliery was a coal mine situated on the outskirts of the village of Barnburgh, about two miles north of Mexborough in the Dearne Valley, South Yorkshire, England. The sinking of the colliery was commenced in 1911 by the Manvers Main Colliery Company of Wath-upon-Dearne.

The sinking reached the Barnsley seam in 1914 and later the Parkgate seam was reached. The colliery was adjacent to the Dearne Valley Railway to which it was connected but in 1924 a private line was constructed between Barnburgh and the Manvers complex.

On 24 April 1942, the mine suffered a collapse in the Park Gate coal seam. Miners reported that the floor rose up towards the ceiling. Geologists put forward the theory that the downward pressure caused the floor to be forced upwards. 18 miners were sealed in and despite frantic rescue efforts, four men died. The last two bodies were located and removed from the pit on 30 April 1942 some six days after the disaster.

In 1947 Barnburgh was, as with other mines, nationalized, becoming part of the National Coal Board.

On 26 June 1957 an explosion at the colliery caused the death of 6 underground workers and severe burning to 14 others. The explosion was caused by firedamp ignited by a 'flash' from a damaged cable. On 4 December 1981, Reginald Canham was killed in an accident aged 57 leaving a wife and two children, one of the last fatalities before its closure.

The colliery was closed on 16 June 1989.
