= Manvers Main Colliery =

Former coal mine in South Yorkshire, England

Coordinates: 53.505°N 1.325°W

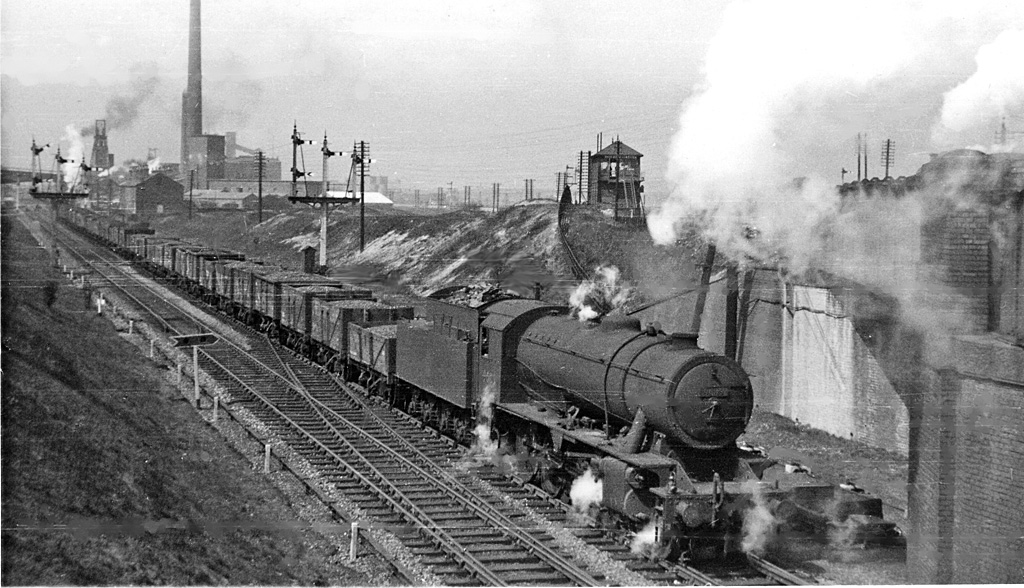
Manvers Main Colliery (left) on the old Great Central railway line (1950)

Manvers Main Colliery was a coal mine, sunk on land belonging to the Earl Manvers on the northern edge of Wath-upon-Dearne, in the borough of Rotherham. Sited within the Dearne Valley, in the West Riding of Yorkshire, England. The regional headquarters and laboratories of British Coal were situated in the complex.

Manvers was a complex comprising the original sinkings known as "Old Manvers", later sinkings known as "New Manvers" and a coke and by-products plant. The first shaft was sunk in the late-19th century followed by the second shaft, sunk between 1900 and 1901, and later a third shaft was sunk.

The Manvers Main Colliery Company was responsible, in 1911, for sinking two shafts at Barnburgh, a village about two miles north east. The collieries were connected by a private railway.

Between 1920 and 1934, the manager of the coke-oven, washery and brickworks departments at Manvers Main was Cornelius Finn, who during this period (1923–24) was also president of the Coke Oven Managers Association.

On 4 March 1945, an accident caused the death of five underground workers. The cause was an explosion of firedamp ignited by sparks from a damaged trailing cable.

Immediately before nationalisation, Manvers was owned by Manvers Main Collieries Ltd. The coke ovens and coal by-products plant were closed in 1981. With rationalisation in the South Yorkshire coalfield, from 1950 to 1956, Manvers became the centre of coal output from the collieries known as the South Manvers complex that were linked below ground. They were Wath Main, Barnburgh Colliery and Kilnhurst. Each colliery retained its individual identity but the coal was wound to the surface at Manvers; this was done to protect the loyalties and friendships of the local pitworkers at each mine. The colliery complex was closed on 25 March 1988.

== Regeneration ==
The site remained derelict until the mid-1990s, when Rotherham Council started a regeneration programme with funding from the European Regional Development Fund and Derelict Land Grants. Manvers, Wath Main Colliery and the Wath railway marshalling yard were demolished, cleared of contamination and landscaped. A nature reserve managed by the RSPB Old Moor Wetland Centre RSPB reserve containing the 45 acre Manvers Lake was created and the rest of the site was developed for light industry and commerce with call centres for companies such as Ventura (bought out by CAPITA in 2011; CAPITA fully took over on 1 January 2012), TSC, T-Mobile and others occupying purpose-built units. The site contains the area's largest area of private employment. It was the location of the nursing campus of the University of Sheffield and is now home to the Dearne Valley College [DVC]. A 9-hole golf course and driving range, hotel, restaurants and residential home were built after plans for a multiplex cinema was objected to by Barnsley Council.

In 2008 the British Canoe Union took a 250-year lease on Manvers Lake. A boat house complex with a cafe, slipway and parking was completed in 2010. With Sport England assistance an annex was added in 2015. The multi-sport club, Manvers Waterfront Boat Club, established in the boat house has 800 members who take part in canoeing, kayaking, triathlon, running, cycling, angling, dragon boating and model boating. In 2016 management of the boathouse, lake and public areas were vested in The Manvers Lake and Dearne Valley Trurt, a registered charity.

Several distribution and warehousing centres dominate the area. Maplin Electronics and Next are two of the companies located here, Maplin after moving from Wombwell, two miles away. In 2015 an incinerator complex was completed on the eastern edge of the site.

Construction of housing developments around the lake at Manvers begun in 2009 were completed in 2015 comprising than 300 homes consisting of apartments and houses. Retail outlets, a health centre and restaurants were completed in 2016 to add to the Blue Bell public house already on the site.

== Sources ==
- Reports of RiDO, Rotherham Investment and Development Office.
