= Willowgarth High School =

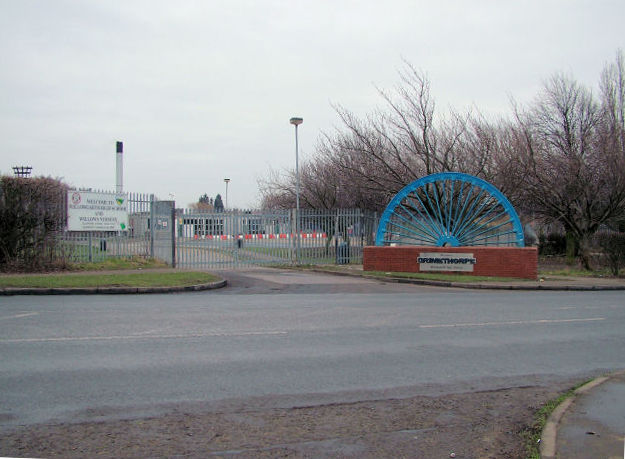
- Entrance to the school (2006)

Location
- Brierley Road; Grimethorpe; Barnsley, South Yorkshire, S72 7AJ; England; 53.58699°N 1.37833°W

Information
- Type: Community
- Established: 1956
- Closed: 2011
- Local authority: Barnsley
- Gender: Mixed
- Age: 11 to 16
- Colours: black, white and red
- Website: http://www.willowgarth.ik.org/

Willowgarth High School was a state school in Barnsley, South Yorkshire, England. The school merged with Priory School and Sports College in 2011 to form Shafton Advanced Learning Centre (now Outwood Academy Shafton) The new school was initially based on both former school sites, but relocated to a new campus in 2012. The old school was subsequently demolished.

== Notable pupils ==
- England international footballer David Hirst

== Notable staff ==
- Mick Wadsworth taught PE at the school
