= Outwood Academy Shafton =

Academy in South Yorkshire, England

Coordinates: 53.5870°N 1.4040°W

Location
- Engine Lane; Shafton; South Yorkshire, S72 8RE; England

Information
- Type: Academy
- Motto: "Students first"
- Established: 2011
- Local authority: Barnsley
- Trust: Outwood Grange
- Department for Education URN: 139211 Tables
- Ofsted: Reports
- Principal: Alison McQueen
- Gender: Mixed
- Age: 11 to 16
- Enrolment: 1,321 as of January 2020
- Capacity: 1,500
- Website: shafton.outwood.com

Outwood Academy Shafton (formerly Shafton Advanced Learning Centre) is a comprehensive secondary school with academy status, located in Shafton, near Barnsley, South Yorkshire, England. It is a mixed school for both girls and boys, ages 11–16, with over 1,000 pupils on roll.

The school is operated by Outwood Grange Academies Trust, and the current principal is Alison Bumford (Mcqueen).

== History ==
Shafton Advanced Learning Centre was established in 2011 following the merger of Priory School and Sports College and Willowgarth High School. It was a community school administered by Barnsley Metropolitan Borough Council. Initially based over both former school sites, the school relocated to a new campus in 2012.

In March 2015, Shafton Advanced Learning Centre converted to academy status and was renamed Outwood Academy Shafton. The school is now sponsored by Outwood Grange Academies Trust, but continues to coordinate with Barnsley Metropolitan Borough Council for admissions.
