= Dearne Valley =

Area of South Yorkshire, England

Coordinates: 53°30′N 1°13′W

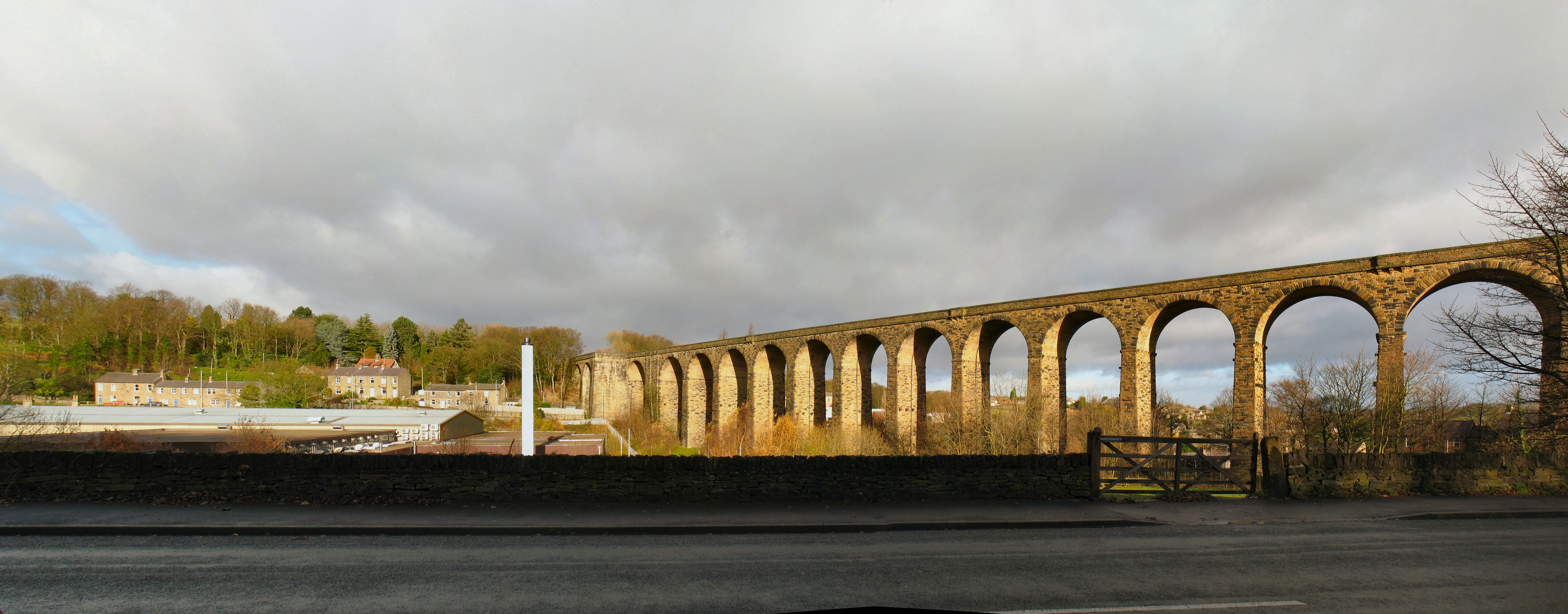
Denby Dale Viaduct on the Penistone Line

The Dearne Valley (DURN) is an area of South Yorkshire, England, along the River Dearne. It encompasses the towns of Wombwell, Wath-upon-Dearne, Swinton, Conisbrough and Mexborough, the large villages of Ardsley, Bolton on Dearne, Goldthorpe, Thurnscoe, Darfield, Stairfoot and Brampton Bierlow, and many other smaller villages and hamlets.

In 1995, the area became a regeneration area, as it had suffered much from the sudden decline of the deep coal mining industry in the 1980s. In the 2011 census, the ONS-identified Barnsley/Dearne Valley built-up area had a population of 223,281; however, this region includes Barnsley and certain other smaller towns and villages that might not historically have considered themselves a part of the Dearne Valley.

== History ==
Many high-grade coal seams, including the prolific Barnsley seam, lie close to the surface in this area. This meant that by far the most prevalent industry in the area was deep coal mining, indeed much of the economic activity of the region was either directly related to, or reliant on this industry. It was home to the Oaks Viaduct, the largest man-made rail bridge in Britain until its demolition in 1965.

In the latter half of the 20th century, the industry was declining and becoming deeply unprofitable, but was kept alive by government subsidy. As early as the 1960s, local politicians voiced concerns about the high level of reliance of the economy of the area on one single industry. In the 1980s, there was a marked change of government economic policy: unprofitable heavy industry was to no longer be subsidised. This caused the collapse of the mining industry, with a knock-on effect in many other local industries, leading to much local hardship.

== The valley today ==
Settlements in the area are becoming more dormitory in nature, as those who remained have found the need to commute further afield to the larger towns and cities in the region to work.

Outside the settlements, primary land use is agricultural: a byproduct of the end of the mining industry is that the area looks more rural and green than it once did. Business parks in the area have been created on brown-field land once used by the mining industry, the most notable and largest is at Manvers.

Much of the infrastructure related to the mining industry was demolished in the 1980s and early 1990s and the land changed to other uses and today few remnants of the coal mining heritage remain: the large spoil heaps have been levelled and grassed, and no coal mining remains at all in the area. Wath marshalling yard which served the railway coal traffic closed in 1988 is now the site of Old Moor Wetland Centre RSPB reserve. Other nature reserves in the valley include Gypsy Marsh, Wombwell Ings and Adwick Washlands.

The road and rail links to the villages of the area also were implemented mostly to ferry coal out of collieries and although the rails have been removed, the embankments, cuttings and bridges remain. Several of these former railways are now part of the Trans Pennine Trail between Southport and Hornsea. The Dearne Valley is at the centre of the trail with the main West/East and North/South routes crossing over in the area.

The historic region has a wide range of buildings and areas which are of major archeological interest and include 14 conservation areas, 15 scheduled ancient monuments, more than 249 listed buildings and above 50 landscapes which are considered to have special value. Some of the prominent buildings include Conisbrough Castle, Church of St. John and St. Mary Magdalene, Hickleton Hall, Glassby Arch, etc.

== See also ==
- List of Yorkshire Pits
