= Grand Pic de Belledonne =

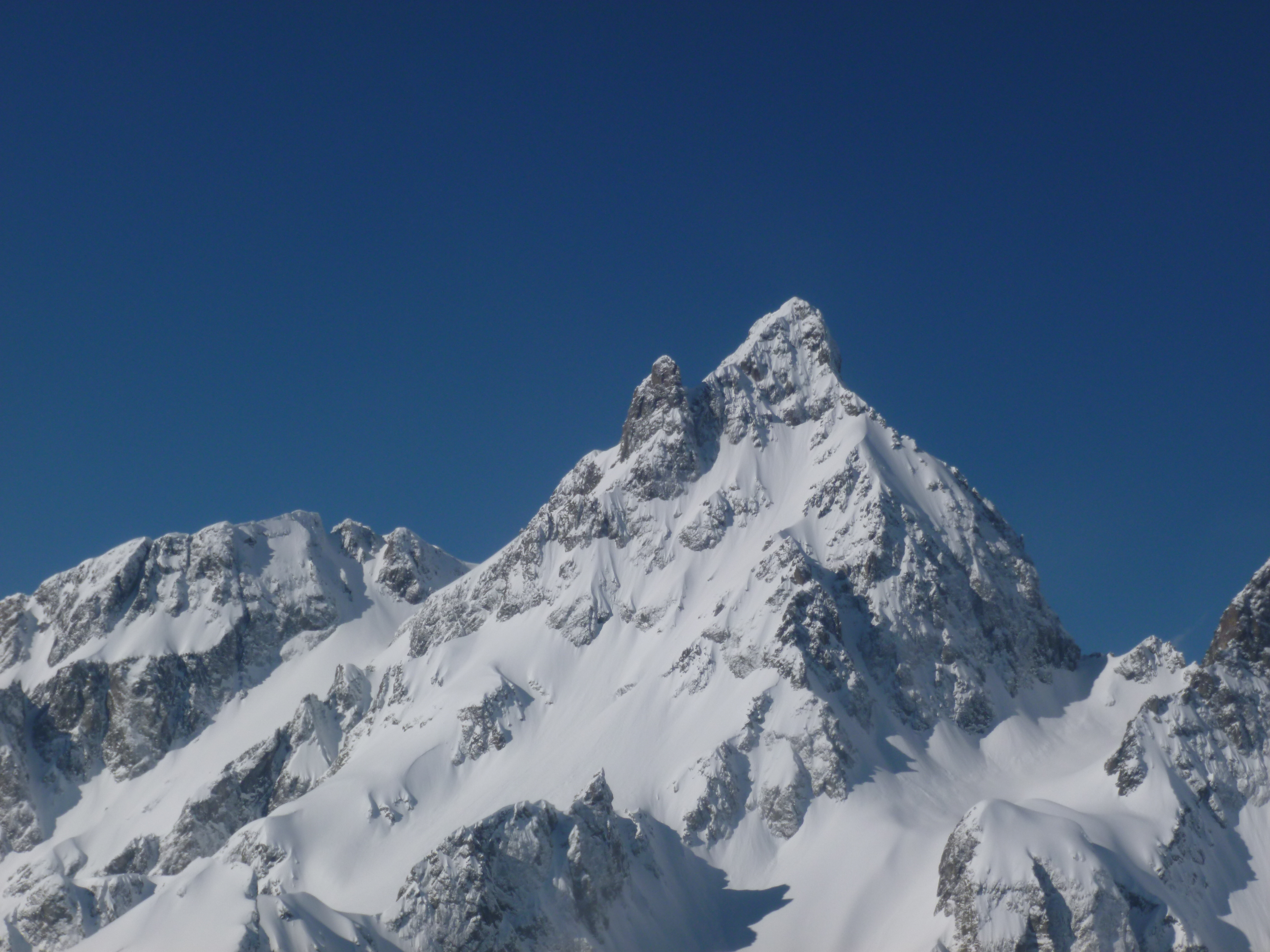
- The Grand Pic de Belledonne

Highest point
- Elevation: 2,977 m (9,767 ft)
- Prominence: 1,053 m (3,455 ft)
- Coordinates: 45°10′16″N 5°59′30″E

Geography
- Location within France
- Location: Isère, Rhône-Alpes
- Parent range: Dauphiné Alps

Climbing
- First ascent: 16 August 1859 by Étienne Favier, Stéphane Chapuis, Alphonse Michel and Frédéric Perrin
- Easiest route: Via refuge Jean Collet and the Lac Blanc

The Grand Pic de Belledonne is the highest mountain in the Belledonne massif in the Dauphiné Alps at 2,977 metres (9,767 ft).

== Geography ==
Situated in the French department of Isère, the Grand Pic of Belledonne dominates the valley of Grésivaudan and partners the Pic Central of Belledonne and the Croix de Belledonne. These three summits dominate the Freydane glacier.

== History ==
Étienne Favier performed the first ascent dates on 16 August 1859, via the valley of Eau d'Olle and the Lac De Belledonne. He repeated that ascent on 17 August 1873 with his son, Émile Viallet and Auguste Michel.

In 1875, the Société des Touristes du Dauphiné constructed the refuge of Belledonne (now in ruins) above the "lac de Belledonne".

The corridor separating the Grand Peak from the Central peak is named after the alpinist Auguste Reynier who, in 1891, made the first climb via the Freydane glacier.

In 1944, Gaston Rébuffat was the first to climb the mountain from the north, accompanied by Michel Chevalier.

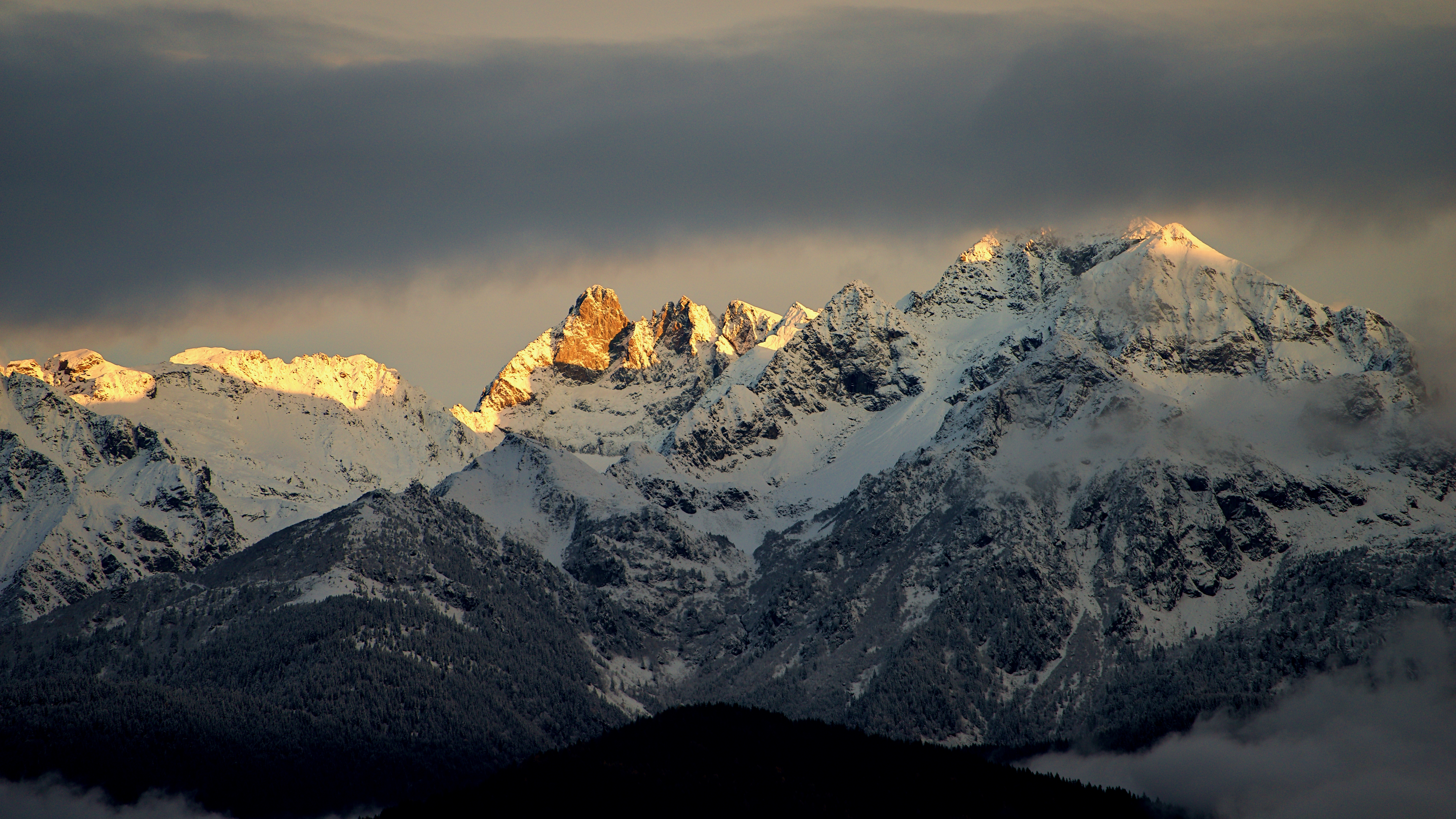
Sunset on Grand Pic de Belledonne

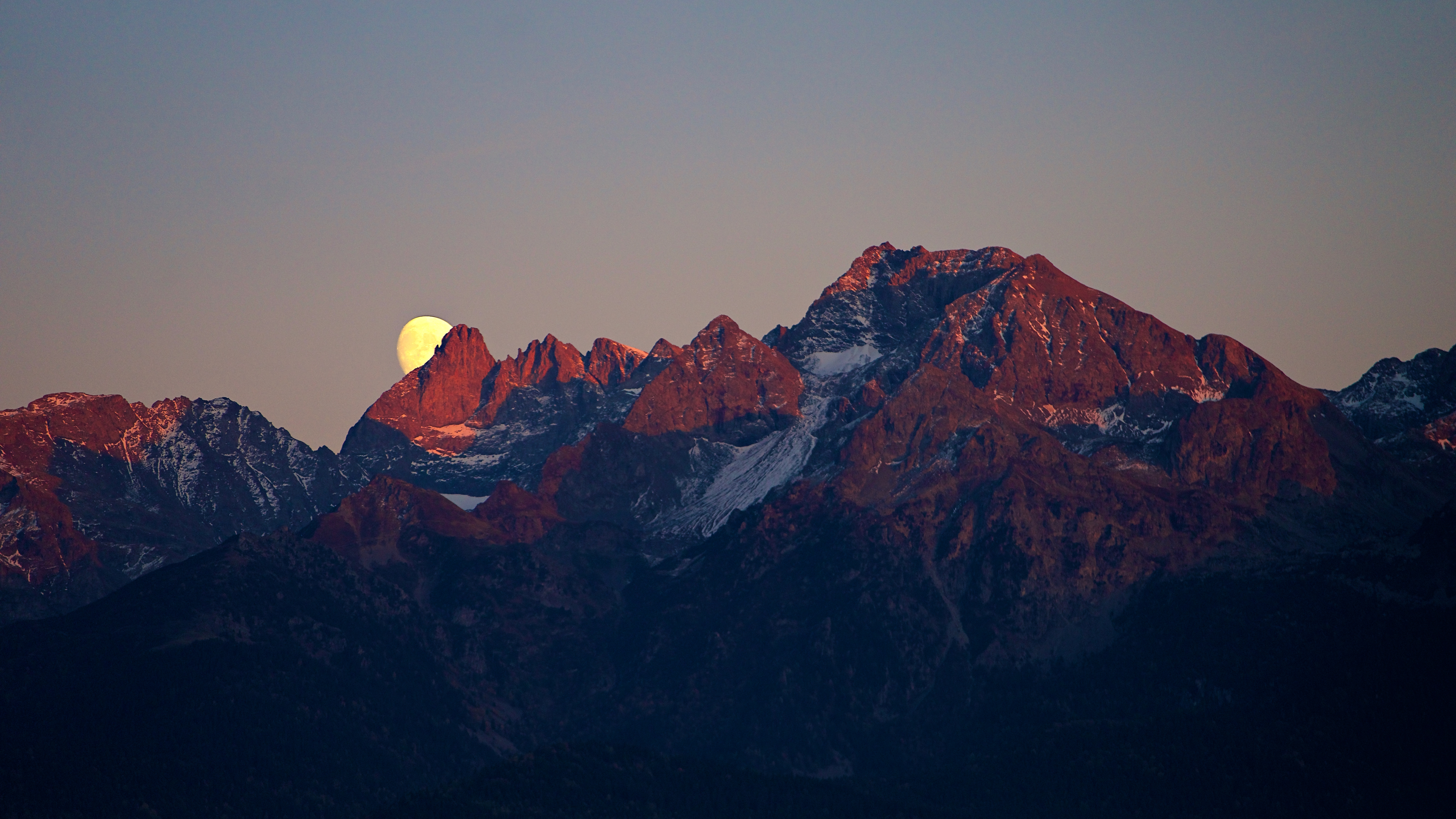
Moonrise on Grand Pic de Belledonne

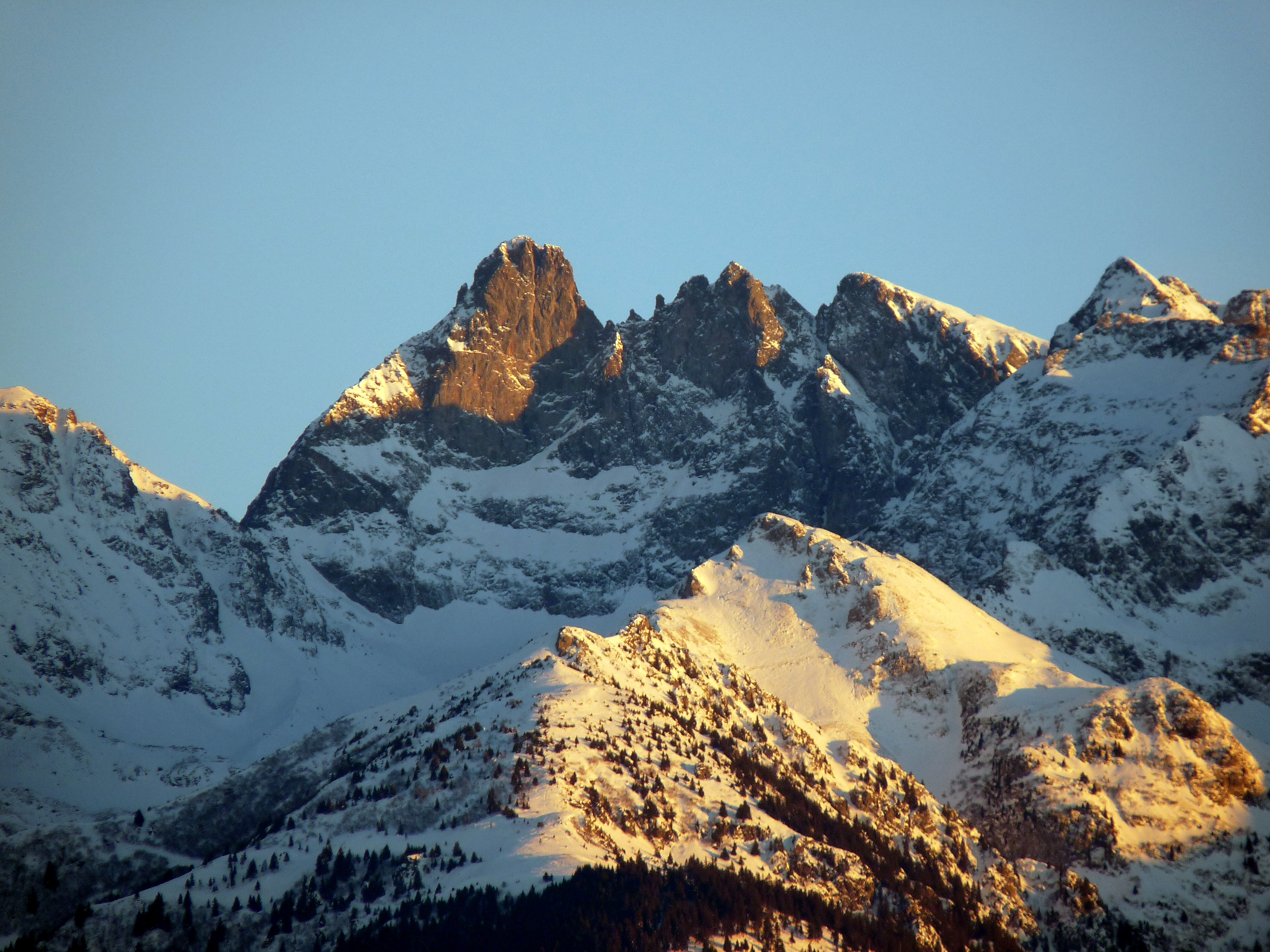
Grand Pic de Belledonne seen from the West
