= Mary Paillon =

French mountain climber and writer

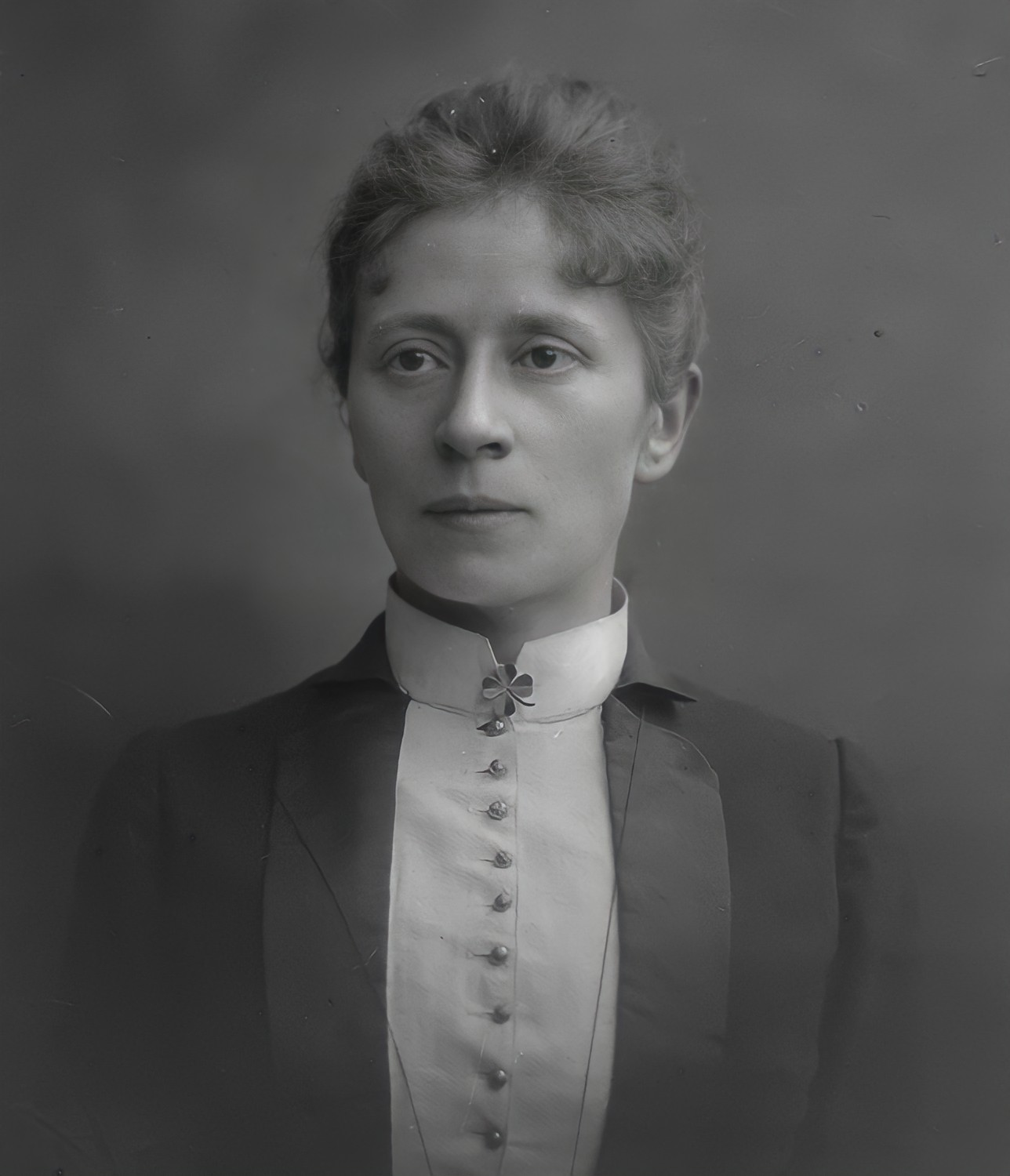
Mary Paillon.jpg

Mary Paillon (1848–1946) was a French mountain climber and writer. She is known for her climbs with Katharine Richardson, and for her contribution to the Alpine Journal and the Ladies' Alpine Club.

== Biography ==
=== Early life ===
Mary Paillon was born in Oullins, Rhône, into a family with a background in medicine and mountaineering. Her mother, Jane Paillon, was an experienced mountain climber with successful ascents of Mont Blanc, the Matterhorn, and Belledonne to her name.

=== Career ===
Paillon began climbing in the Alps under the guidance of her mother and her brother, Maurice Paillon. She met Katharine Richardson, an English climber, in 1888 when Richardson was climbing the Meije. They agreed to climb together the next year, and eventually became close friends and frequent climbing partners. In the winter of 1890, together they traversed the Belledonne range in the Dauphiné Alps, and in 1891 they made the first female ascent of the Méridionale d'Arves. They climbed the Meije Orientale with Émile Rey in 1893, marking the third ascent of the peak by women, and Mont Pelvoux in 1897. Following their expedition to Pelvoux, Paillon's eyesight began to deteriorate and she and Richardson retired from serious climbing, since Richardson refused to climb when Paillon could not. The two women subsequently settled together in the Paillon family estate in Oullins.

Paillon became a distinguished writer after retiring from climbing. In the period of 1895–1905 she was one of three female contributors to the Alpine Journal (edited at the time by her brother) and was responsible for fourteen of the seventeen pieces written by women. She largely wrote biographies of other women climbers; alongside Henriette d'Angeville, she wrote accounts of Richardson, Meta Brevoort, and Isabella Charlet-Straton. In 1910, Paillon was elected vice president of the Ladies' Alpine Club.

=== Late years and death ===
After Richardson's death in 1927, Paillon wrote in an obituary that Richardson had been "almost a sister to me". Paillon died in 1946 at the age of 98, having outlived Richardson by 25 years and never married.
