= Edlington =

Town and civil parish in South Yorkshire, England

Coordinates: 53.481°N 1.182°W

- Town
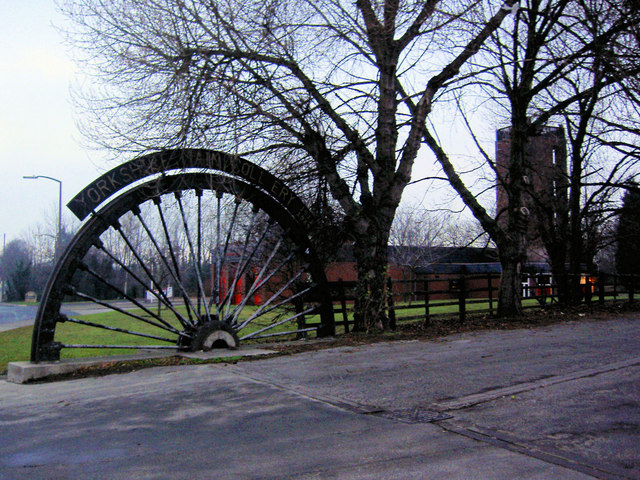
- Winding wheel from Yorkshire Main Colliery

- Location within South Yorkshire
- Population: 8,276 (2001)
- OS grid reference: SK5397
- Civil parish: Edlington
- Metropolitan borough: City of Doncaster
- Metropolitan county: South Yorkshire
- Region: Yorkshire and the Humber
- Country: England
- Sovereign state: United Kingdom
- Post town: DONCASTER
- Postcode district: DN12
- Dialling code: 01709
- Police: South Yorkshire
- Fire: South Yorkshire
- Ambulance: Yorkshire
- UK Parliament: Rawmarsh and Conisbrough

Edlington is a town and civil parish in the City of Doncaster, South Yorkshire, England, lying to the south west of Doncaster and Warmsworth. It has a population of 8,276. The original parish town of Edlington is now known as Old Edlington; adjacent, and to the north, is New Edlington. It is often referred to by locals as 'Edlo'. Since 1974 Edlington has been part of the Metropolitan Borough of Doncaster in the metropolitan county of South Yorkshire. It had, since 1894, formed part of Doncaster Rural District in the West Riding of Yorkshire.

== Upper Palaeolithic and Mesolithic period ==
During the final stages of the last Ice Age, a period known as the Upper Palaeolithic and Mesolithic Periods, Edlington was a place of settlement for the Palaeolithic groups of early nomadic humans. The groups had followed the improving climate northwards as the ice sheets covering Europe retreated. In 2003 the South Yorkshire Archaeological Survey found compelling evidence that these early groups of humans had been using caves and natural outcrops in Edlington wood as shelters and bases for hunting. Quantities of flint tools from the period were unearthed near to a rock shelter in the wood. During the period in which the tools can be dated, the landscape of the area was a vast, treeless tundra, with forestation occurring only as late into the period as 7500 BC.

Edlington, along with the areas known locally as Rossington, Bawtry and Hatfield are the only areas within Doncaster that show these early signs of human occupation.

== Saxon meaning ==
The name Edlington which pre-dates the Norman conquest is evidence of some former consequence: /Kpniinj tun, the town of the Atheling. The Atheling being an Old English term (æþeling) used in Anglo-Saxon England to designate Princes of the Royal Dynasty who were eligible for the Kingship. Variations such as Ætheling, Atheling or Etheling appear in many English place names, attributing land ownership to the Atheling. Local Legend holds Athlane, the Dane to be the landowner of the ancient residence in the town.

== Great Domesday Book ==
Edlington is recorded in the Domesday Book of 1086, which is a highly detailed survey and valuation of all the land held by the King William I and his chief tenants, along with all the resources that went with the land in late 11th-century England. Edlington appears in the Domesday Book as Eilintone and Ellintone.

Among the persons named in the entry for Old Edlington were among others Aubrey de Coucy, Earl of Northumbria, Ilbert de Lacy, Roger de Busli, Walter D'Aincourt, William 1st Baron Percy and William de Warenne, 1st Earl of Surrey.

== Churches ==
=== St Peter's Parish Church ===
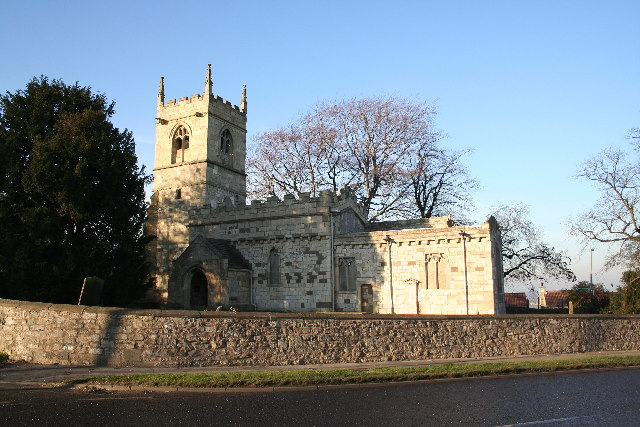
St Peter's Church

St Peter's Church dates from the late 12th century, when the Norman style was becoming transitional, and it is considered a masterpiece of curious Norman carvings, and has a chancel arch decorated with several rows of chevrons. The upper stage of the tower and the north chapel are Perpendicular. A Norman corbel table runs along the south exterior wall, with a variety of carved figures depicting grotesque beasts and human heads. There is a similar corbel table with carved figures inside the church, between the aisle and nave. The interior has 17th-century brasses, and pillars with "basket and leaf" decoration. There is a 15th-century screen, examples of Jacobean woodwork, and a font dated 1599.

This church was declared redundant in 1962 when its parish was united with that of New Edlington, creating the new title of Old Edlington Church. After suffering years of uncertainty and vandalism, this building was the first church to be vested in the Churches Conservation Trust, then known as the Redundant Churches Fund, in 1971. In that year, the church was virtually in ruins and was extensively restored.

=== St. John the Baptist Church ===
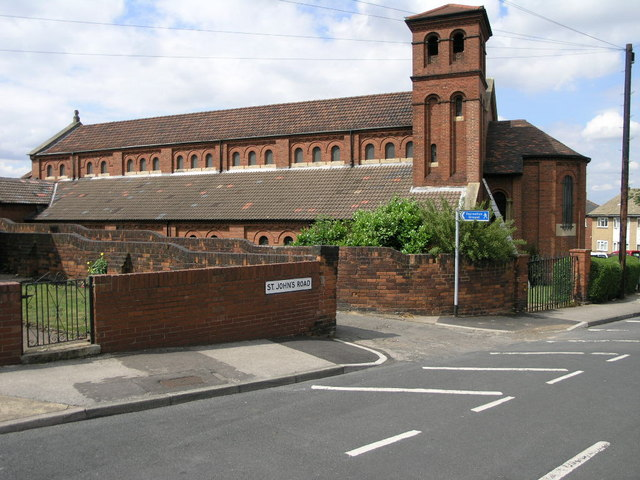
St John's Church

St. John the Baptist, Parish Church in Edlington is an Anglican Church, in the Diocese of Sheffield which forms part of the Church of England. The church is located at the junction of Main Avenue and St John's Road.

The church is currently working on a restoration project to restore the church to its former glory, from when it was originally opened shortly after the opening of Yorkshire Main Colliery in the 1920s.

=== Edlington Methodist Church ===
Edlington Methodist Church is located on Main Avenue.

=== St. Mary's Roman Catholic Church ===
St Mary's Catholic Church in Edlington is located within the grounds of St Mary's Catholic Primary School on Bungalow Road.

=== Antiochian Orthodox Church of St. Columba and St. Kentigern ===
The Antiochian Orthodox parish of St. Columba and St. Kentigern in Edlington is located at the top of Staveley Street.

=== Warmsworth and New Edlington National Spiritualist Church ===
Warmsworth and New Edlington National Spiritualist Church in Edlington is located on Edlington Lane, off Warmsworth Halt.

== The Edlington (Yorkshire) Land and Development Company Limited ==
The Edlington (Yorkshire) Land and Development Company Limited, and the partnership which preceded it, was responsible for building a substantial part of the colliery village of New Edlington between 1909 and about 1922. The village was built to house the workers who moved into the area on the sinking of the Yorkshire Main Colliery.

The colliery was created by the Staveley Coal and Iron Company, which bought land in Edlington and leased the right to exploit the coal reserves under this and adjoining land from the Battie-Wrightson of Cusworth estate in several transactions in 1909 and 1910. William Wrightson of Cusworth had acquired the Edlington estate in 1803 from the Molesworth family, which had owned it since the late 17th century.

The Land and Development Company (and its satellite, the Edlington Co-operative Tenants Ltd.), built the streets on the north-west of Edlington Lane, bounded by Victoria Road to the north, Gordon Road to the south, and St John's Road and Church Road to the west. (It also purchased Staveley Street, to the north of Victoria Road from the original developer). Altogether, the estate as defined by deeds deposited at the National Archives comprised 557 houses and sixteen shops when completed.

The area to the south of Main Avenue was developed by an organisation called the Edlington Co-operative Tenants Ltd. This purchased the 10.837 acres (43,860 m^{2}) of land, which eventually supported 200 houses, from the Land and Development Company in October 1914. However, it appears that this organisation was essentially the Land and Development Company in another guise, as the membership of its board was identical with that of the Land and Development Company. This may have been done to make it easier to obtain the mortgage funds necessary to build the houses.

== Edlington Halt ==
Edlington Halt was a small railway station on the eastern terminus of the Dearne Valley Railway. The halt's first title was originally "Edlington for Balby Doncaster" (with the words 'for' and 'Doncaster' in lettering at half size compared to the others). It was built to serve the mining village of Edlington where the local mine, Yorkshire Main Colliery had been sunk and the surrounding Doncaster suburbs including that of Balby.

Like many other railway stations across the Dearne Valley region, it consisted of beds of sleepers all set at track level. The large station sign was removed in the late 1920s and replaced by a simple "Edlington" sign instead. The railway station was opened for passengers on 3 June 1912 and ceased on 10 September 1951.

== Sites of Special Scientific Interest ==
Edlington Wood is a 99.7-hectare (246-acre) site located at Grid Ref: SK 549980 an altitude of 45–80 metres some 4 km to the south west of Doncaster; this is the largest single unit of predominantly deciduous woodland on the magnesian limestone in South Yorkshire. It includes large areas of ancient woodland dating from Romano-British times and supports extremely rich plant and animal communities which reflect the site's antiquity, history of forest management, diversity of soil types and moisture conditions. Edlington Wood was designated as a Site of Special Scientific Interest (SSSIS) in 1979.

New Edlington Brickpit is a 0.2-hectare (0.49-acre) site located at Grid Ref: SK 531988 that consists of one face of a disused brickpit. The face is composed of clays and mudstones formed some 255 million years ago, in the Permian period. Above these, is a deposit known as dolomite, a rock similar to limestone, but rich in magnesium that is over 8 metres thick at the brickpit. The rocks exposed in the brickpit represent the best available exposure of their type and the site is of special research interest because it enables geologists to understand the conditions of the period. In addition, the site is recognised and used by geologists throughout Britain as the standard reference locality for these rocks. The site was designated as a Site of Special Scientific Interest (SSSIS) in 1989.

== Scheduled ancient monuments ==
Edlington Wood contains the site of an ancient Roman settlement, which is scheduled as an ancient monument and considered to be a 'nationally important' archaeological site. The settlement remains are designated and afforded protection under the Ancient Monuments and Archaeological Areas Act 1979. English Heritage also listed the site under the "Heritage at Risk Register 2009". The condition of the site is generally satisfactory, but it is considered at risk of further degradation due to significant localised problems. The site is expected to further decline in the future.

== People ==
=== Viscount Molesworth 1st ===
Robert Molesworth, 1st Viscount Molesworth, and his wife Lady Letitia Molesworth both lived in the property now known as Blow Hall Manor in the grounds of Edlington Wood in the late 17th century until the mid 18th century. Viscount Molesworth was also a Member of Parliament for the West Riding of Yorkshire constituency now known as Don Valley and an Irish Peer in the House of Lords.

=== Joe Harvey ===
Joe Harvey was born in Edlington on 11 June 1918 and was a two-time FA Cup winning English football player and later manager. He spent much of his career at Newcastle United; he was the club's longest serving captain, manager, and, as of the 2021–22 season, the last to win a major trophy when he managed Newcastle to the 1968–69 Inter-Cities Fairs Cup, a forerunner of the Europa League.

=== Ron Flowers ===
Ronald Flowers was born in Edlington on 28 July 1934 was an English football player, most known for his time at Wolverhampton Wanderers. He was a member of England's victorious 1966 World Cup squad.

=== Graham Kirkham, Baron Kirkham ===
Graham Kirkham CVO was born 14 December 1944 in Edlington, and is an English businessman famous for founding sofa retailer DFS.

Currently Executive Chairman of DFS Furniture Company Ltd, Kirkham is a strong political and financial supporter of the Conservative Party, and is one of South Yorkshire's richest men, with a personal fortune estimated at £315 million.

Adopted at the age of three weeks, he is the only son of Edlington miner Tom Kirkham and his wife Elsie. He once said of his adopted parents, "My whole life has been the luck of going to a good family."

After passing the Eleven plus exam, he attended Maltby Grammar School (since 1967 called Maltby Comprehensive School) and hoped to join the Royal Air Force as a pilot. Failing to get the required five O levels, Kirkham got a job in a local furniture store.

=== Katharine Richardson ===
Katharine Richardson (24 April 1854 – 20 August 1927) was an outstanding British female mountain climber. She was born in Edlington and made many first ascents in the Alps after 1879. She was well known for the first ascent of the ridge from the Aiguille de Bionnassay to the Dome de Gouter, in the Mont Blanc massif; a route that had defeated many experienced male climbers. She was so fit she went faster than her guide for whom she had to wait for 45 minutes while he recovered. Amongst her notable achievements was the prized first female ascent of the Meije in 1888. After this ascent she met Mary Paillon (1848–1946), and they climbed together and lived in the Paillon home at Oullins, Rhône, France, where Richardson died in 1927.

== Yorkshire Main Colliery ==
Yorkshire Main Colliery was a coal mine situated within the village of Edlington. The colliery closed in 1985.

== See also ==
- Grade I listed buildings in South Yorkshire
- List of churches preserved by the Churches Conservation Trust in Northern England
- Listed buildings in Edlington
- Edlington attacks
