= Katharine Richardson =

British mountain climber

Sarah Katharine "Katy" Richardson (24 April 1854 – 20 August 1927), also referred to as Kathleen Richardson, was a British mountain climber. She made numerous first ascents in the Alps and climbed frequently with her close friend Mary Paillon.

== Biography ==
=== Early life ===
Richardson was born at Edlington, Yorkshire, to Rev. George Richardson and Isabel Nussey. She is the second of five daughters. She was first exposed to mountaineering when she visited the Alps at the age of sixteen. She began climbing at seventeen, starting with the mountains Piz Languard and Piz Corvatsch.

=== Career ===
Richardson began climbing in 1871. She became well-known at 1879, when she became the first person to traverse Piz Palü in the Bernina Range. In 1882, in a span of eight days she climbed the Zinalrothorn, the Weisshorn, the Matterhorn and Monte Rosa. Accompanied by Pierre Gaspard and J. B. Bich, in 1888 she became the first woman to climb La Meije, which the editor of the Alpine Journal at the time thought to be "the most noteworthy" event of the climbing season. The same year, she made the first ascent of the Aiguille de Bionnassay, the first traverse from the Bionnassay to the Dôme du Goûter, and the first ascent of the Aiguilles des Charmoz. In 1889 she made the first traverse from the Petit Dru to the Grand Dru.

While climbing the Meije, Richardson met Mary Paillon, who became her close friend and frequent climbing partner. In 1890, they traversed the Belledonne range in winter, and the following year made the first female ascent of the Méridionale d'Arves. Richardson and Paillon made their final major ascent in 1897, of Mont Pelvoux—one of whose peaks was later named Pointe Richardson in Katharine's honour.

Richardson was known for her speed and athleticism; she set numerous records for speed and endurance, which Ronald Clark notes "discomfited many male climbers". One of her guides commented, "She does not sleep, she doesn't eat and she walks like the devil." She was also known for wearing a skirt on all of her expeditions, even when her partner Paillon wore breeches.

=== Retirement and death ===
Richardson and Paillon retired from serious climbing after 1897 as Paillon's eyesight began to fail and Richardson refused to climb without her. By the end of her career, Richardson had completed 176 ascents over eleven climbing seasons, 116 of which were considered major climbs. Six of these were first ascents, and an additional fourteen were the first ascents made by a woman. She was a member of the Club alpin français and the Ladies' Alpine Club (LAC). She declined the presidency of the LAC twice, in 1912 and 1919, dedicating her time to watercolour painting instead.

Richardson died in 1927, aged 73 and unmarried, at the Paillon home in Oullins, Rhône. In an obituary, Paillon described Richardson as having been "almost a sister to me".
