= Brian Keith (judge) =

English judge (born 1944)

- 祁彥輝

High Court Judge (England and Wales)
- In office 2001 – April 2014

Justice of Appeal
- In office 1999–2001

Judge in charge of the Constitutional and Administrative Law List
- In office 1996–1999

Sir Brian Richard Keith (Chinese: 祁彥輝) (born 14 April 1944) is a British judge who served on the High Court of England and Wales from 2001 to 2014 and as a judge of the High Court of Hong Kong from 1991 to 2001. Since 2014, he has sat as a part-time deputy High Court judge in the Court of First Instance of Hong Kong.

== Education and early career ==
Keith is the son of Alan Keith, the broadcaster best known for devising and presenting the long-running programme Your Hundred Best Tunes on BBC's Radio 2, who was of Russian-Jewish descent. His sister Linda Keith was a socialite of the Swinging Sixties.

He was educated at University College School, Hampstead, and read law at Lincoln College, Oxford. From 1966-67, he was a John F. Kennedy Fellow at Harvard Law School. He was called to the bar at Inner Temple in 1968 and elected a bencher in 1996. He was appointed an Assistant Recorder in 1988 and appointed a Queen's Counsel in 1989. He practised in employment and administrative law from the chambers of Lord Irvine of Lairg QC, where a fellow member was Tony Blair.

== Judicial career in Hong Kong ==
In 1991, Keith became a judge of the High Court of Hong Kong (which was renamed the Court of First Instance when Hong Kong's Supreme Court was renamed the High Court in 1997) and was given a Chinese name "祁彥輝" by the Hong Kong Judiciary. He was appointed a Recorder in 1993. In 1996 he became the first judge in charge of the High Court's new Constitutional and Administrative Law List in preparation for the resumption of sovereignty over Hong Kong by China in 1997. He was promoted to the Hong Kong Court of Appeal in 1999, serving until 2001.

In 2014 - 2018, 2020 and 2023 - 2026, Keith is sitting as a part-time Deputy Judge of the High Court of Hong Kong SAR. Keith presided over several high profile trials, such as the 2012 Lamma Island Ferry Collision, the re-trial of the yoga ball murder case against Professor Khaw Kim-sun, and the murder trial of Abby Choi in 2026.

== Judicial career in England and Wales ==
On 1 October 2001, Keith was appointed a judge of the High Court of England and Wales, receiving the customary knighthood, and assigned to the Queen's Bench Division. From 2004 to 2006, he was the chairman of the public inquiry into the racist murder of Zahid Mubarek, an Asian teenager, in his cell at Feltham Young Offenders Institution. He also presided over the litigation involving the MMR vaccine, in which the parents of children allegedly damaged by the vaccine sued a number of pharmaceutical companies for product liability and negligence.

Among the notable criminal trials he presided over were the case of Anthony Hardy, who became known as the Camden Ripper who strangled prostitutes and disposed of their body parts in dustbins in Camden Town. Keith subsequently ruled that he should never be released from prison.

Keith was also the trial judge in the case of Maninder Kohli, the first Indian national to have been extradited to the UK from India, and who was convicted of the kidnapping, rape and murder of Hannah Foster but Keith sentenced Kohli only to life with a minimum of 24 years, leaving Kohli eligible for parole in 2030.

Keith also presided over the trials of the two boys who had tortured two other youngsters and left them for dead ("the Edlington Two"), and of Kweku Adoboli, the Ghana-born trader at UBS who was convicted of two counts of fraud and sentenced to seven years imprisonment in a $2,000,000,000 (billion) fraud case.
