= Listed buildings in Edlington =

Edlington is a civil parish in the metropolitan borough of Doncaster, South Yorkshire, England. The parish contains five listed buildings that are recorded in the National Heritage List for England. Of these, one is listed at Grade I, the highest of the three grades, and the others are at Grade II, the lowest grade. The parish contains the town of Edlington and the surrounding area. The listed buildings consist of a church, a dovecote, a monument to the memory of a dog, a farmhouse, and a war memorial.

== Key ==
| Grade | Criteria |
|---|---|
| I | Particularly important buildings of more than special interest |
| II | Buildings of national importance and special interest |

== Buildings ==
| Name and location | Photograph | Date | Notes | Grade |
|---|---|---|---|---|
| St Peter's Church; 53.46941°N 1.19930°W | | Late 12th century | The church, which has been altered and extended through the centuries, is now redundant. It is built in magnesian limestone with a lead roof, and consists of a nave with a south porch, a north aisle, a chancel and chapel, and a west tower. The base of the tower dates from the 12th century, and the upper parts are in Perpendicular style. The tower has diagonal west buttresses, a two-light west window, string courses, gargoyles on the north and south sides, and an embattled parapet with corner crocketed pinnacles. The porch is gabled, it has a moulded arch, and contains stone benches, and the doorway has zig-zag and beak-head ornament. | I |
| Dovecote; 53.46930°N 1.19843°W | | 17th century | The dovecote is in magnesian limestone, with stone slate eaves courses, and a pantile roof with crow-stepped gables. There are two storeys and a single bay. On the north side is a door with a chamfered surround, a continuous ledge runs round the building, and in the returns are ledges under blocked openings. | II |
| Monument east of Wood Hall; 53.48647°N 1.17597°W | — | 1714 | The monument is to the memory of a dog, and is in magnesian limestone or marble. It consists of a large urn on a square pedestal with a moulded plinth, panels and an inscription. The urn has an octagonal base and gadrooning decoration. | II |
| Manor Farm House; 53.46969°N 1.19878°W | | c. 1800 | The farmhouse is rendered, and has a slate roof with coped gables and shaped kneelers. There are two blocks, the left with two storeys and two bays, and the right with three storeys and two bays. In the right part is a doorway with a cornice on consoles, the left part contains a canted bay window, and in both parts the other windows are sashes. | II |
| War memorial 53.48640°N 1.18738°W | — | Early 1920s | The war memorial is in a garden, and was originally to the memory of the men from Yorkshire Main Colliery lost in the First World War. It is in limestone, and consists of an urn on a pedestal, on a two-stepped plinth on a square podium. On the pedestal are inscriptions, the names of the men from the colliery lost in the First World War, and the names of those lost in the Second World War. | II |
