= Croix de Belledonne =

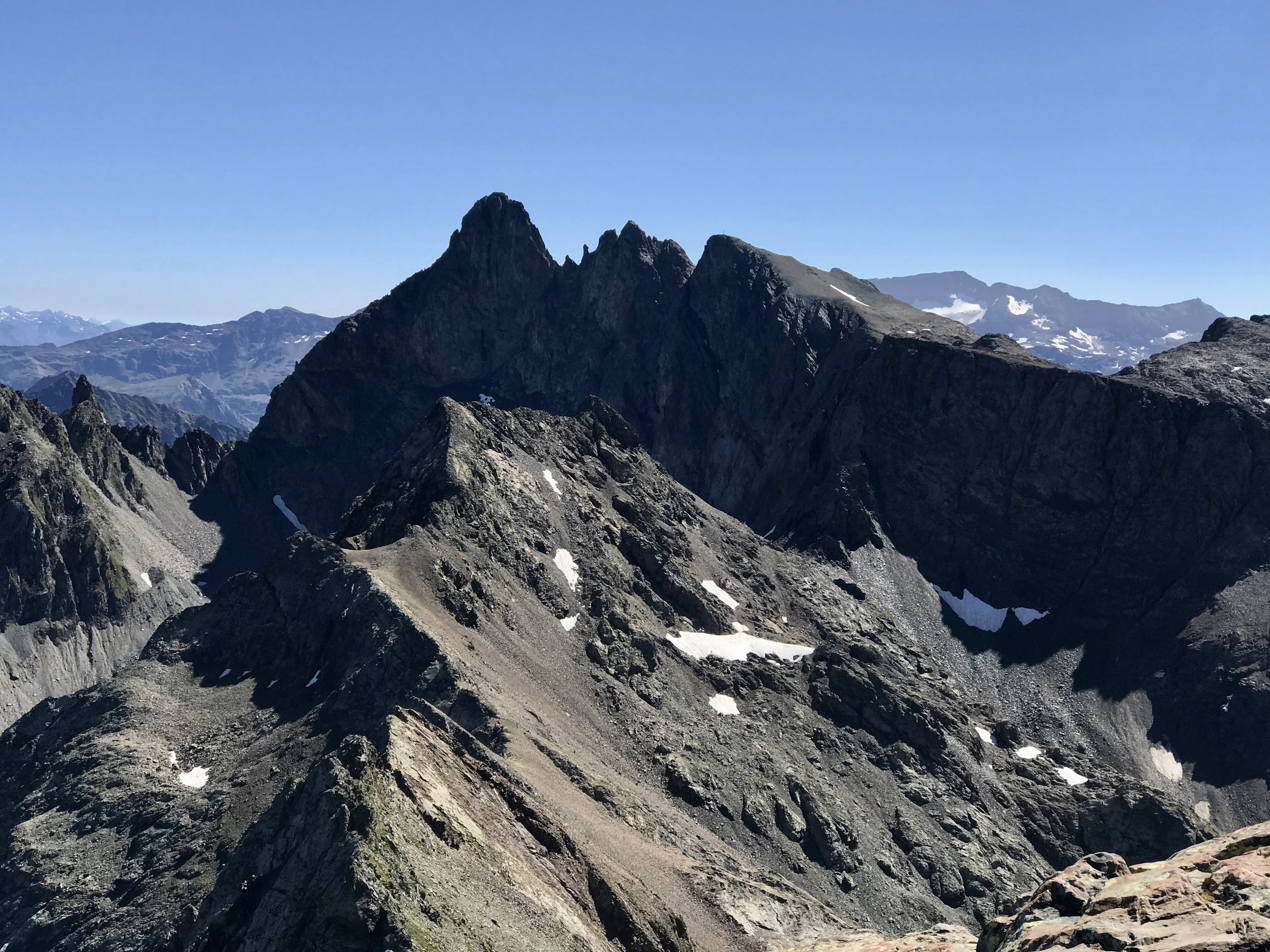
- Left to right: Grand Pic, Pic Central and Croix de Belledonne (the cross is visible in high resolution)

Highest point
- Elevation: 2,926 m (9,600 ft)
- Listing: Belledonne, Alps
- Coordinates: 45°10′07″N 5°59′18″E

Geography
- Location within France
- Location: Isère, Rhône-Alpes
- Parent range: Belledonne, French Alps

Climbing
- First ascent: estimated 1850; First winter ascent on 23 February 1890 by Maurice Allotte de la Fuye.
- Easiest route: Via the Lacs du Doménon

Croix de Belledonne, at 2,926 metres (9,600 ft), is one of the highest points in the Belledonne range in the French Alps, close to the highest summit in the range, Grand Pic de Belledonne at 2,977 metres (9,767 ft). The name derives from the cross erected on the summit (croix means cross in French).

== Geography ==
Located in the department of Isère, Croix of Belledonne is one of the highest summits in the Belledonne range.

== History ==
The first ascension is estimated to have taken place around 1850.

The gap separating the Croix de Belledonne from the Central Peak is named after the alpinist Henry Duhamel

== See also ==
=== External links ===
- Géologie des Trois Pics de Belledonne
