= Alan Keith =

British actor and DJ (1908–2003)

Alan Keith OBE
- Born: Alexander Kossoff; 19 October 1908; Hackney, London, England
- Died: 17 March 2003 (aged 94); London, England
- Occupations: Actor, disc jockey, radio presenter
- Spouse: Pearl Rebuck (m. 1941)
- Children: Brian Keith; Linda Keith
- Relatives: David Kossoff (brother); Paul Kossoff (nephew)

Alan Keith, OBE (born Alexander Kossoff; 19 October 1908 – 17 March 2003) was a British actor, disc jockey and radio presenter, noted for being the longest-serving and eldest presenter on British radio by the time of his death aged 94.

== Background ==
Alexander "Alec" Kossoff was born in Hackney, London, the eldest of three children of Russian-Jewish parents. Keith's younger brother David Kossoff also became an actor.

He was educated at Dame Alice Owen's School in Islington, and in 1926 he won a scholarship to the Royal Academy of Dramatic Art, where he anglicised his name to Alan Keith. He graduated in 1928 with the silver medal, and spent the next eight years on the West End and Broadway stage.

== Career ==
By 1935, Alan Keith was already an established voice on BBC radio, appearing in dozens of radio plays as a member of the drama stock company and spending three years as an interviewer for In Town Tonight. He also acted in films, appearing in Dangerous Moonlight (1941), The World Owes Me a Living (1945), The Long Knife (1958) and Yesterday's Enemy (1959). In pre-war television broadcasts, he discovered he had a facility with American accents, and he continued to play American characters on television and radio through the 1940s and 1950s.

=== Your Hundred Best Tunes ===
Beginning in the early 1950s, he devoted time to devising and presenting music programmes for the BBC. In 1959, he devised Your Hundred Best Tunes, a programme of famous classical music, operetta and ballads. Keith chose the original 100 pieces himself. Many works were suggested by listeners and played in the programme. Thus a good many more than 100 works were played and the list evolved. Therefore, in subsequent years, a 100 Best were periodically voted for by listeners. Keith was awarded an OBE in 1991 for services to broadcasting. In early March 2003, at the age of 94, he recorded an announcement that he intended to retire from the programme after 44 years. However, he fell ill almost immediately afterward, and before long died; his final programme was broadcast 12 days after his death.

== Family ==
Keith married Pearl Rebuck in 1941. Their son Sir Brian Keith was for some years from 2001 a judge in the High Court of England and Wales; their daughter Linda Keith was formerly a bohemian socialite, and is known for her associations with the Rolling Stones and Jimi Hendrix.

Keith's nephew Paul Kossoff was a guitarist with the rock band Free.

== Partial filmography ==
- The Avenging Hand (1936) - Receptionist (uncredited)
- Dangerous Moonlight (1941) - (uncredited)
- Give Us the Moon (1944) - Raphael
- The World Owes Me a Living (1945) - Flying circus manager (uncredited)
- The Long Knife (1958) - Dr. Ian Probus
- Yesterday's Enemy (1959) - Bendish (uncredited)
- 80,000 Suspects (1963) - Health Inspector Sanders (uncredited)
