= Emmeline Lewis Lloyd =

Land owner and mountaineer

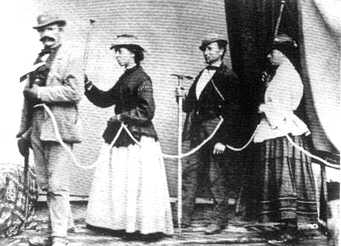
- (l to r) Head guide, Emmeline Lewis-Lloyd, Jean Charlet and Bessie Lewis-Lloyd – alpine climbers
- Born: 18 November 1827; Nantgwyllt, Wales
- Died: 22 September 1913 (aged 85); London, England

Emmeline Lewis-Lloyd (18 November 1827 – 22 September 1913) was an early Welsh alpine mountaineer. She was in the first party to climb Aiguille du Moine in 1871 with Jean Charlet.

== Life ==
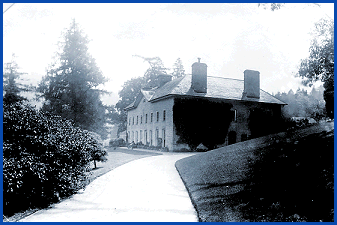
Nantgwyllt manor house home of the Lewis Lloyds in Powys

Lloyd was born in 1827 in Wales. She was the fourth child. Her father and mother owned the Nantgwyllt manor house in the, now flooded, Elan valley. Her father, Thomas Lewis-Lloyd, was a Justice of the Peace and High Sheriff of Cardiganshire in 1822. Lewis Lloyd was one of several daughters, her brother was Robert Lewis-Lloyd, she was an independent child and she ran a farm at Llandyfaelog Fach that bred mountain ponies. Her hobbies included walking, fishing and otter hunting. She would tell stories of her exploits climbing the alps with her friend and second cousin Isabella Straton. One of her guides had been Jean Charlet, a French mountain guide from Chamonix, who had been a groom in Nantgwyllt for a year. Lewis Lloyd and Straton had been two of the very rare women who climbed the Alps and Pyrenees in the 1860s and 70s. In 1869 just four years after it was first climbed they made an unsuccessful attempt on the Matterhorn. In 1870 they became the first women to climb Monte Viso and the following year they made the first ascent of Aiguille du Moine guided by Joseph Simond. The summit is at an altitude of 3,412 m and it requires climbers to abseil on the descent. Lewis Lloyd retired from climbing in 1873, but Straton continued to climb with Jean Charlet and she eventually married him.

Lloyd died at Hampstead Hill Gardens in London. She is buried at Llansanffraid Cwmteuddwr and the church there has a memorial. The plaque notes that she was the eighth woman to climb Mont Blanc.
