= Linda Keith =

British model

Linda Keith (born 1946) is a former British fashion model, best known for her work for Vogue magazine during the 1960s as well as her involvement in the rock music scene during the Swinging Sixties.

== Early life ==
Keith was born in West Hampstead, London, England, to Pearl Rebuck and Alan Keith, a British actor and radio presenter. Her brother Brian Keith is a judge.

== Career ==
Keith began modeling in the 60s, which her father objected to. While working for Vogue, Linda dated Keith Richards and later Brian Jones and spent time living in New York City where she frequented the clubs in Greenwich Village. She helped discover Jimi Hendrix by introducing him to Chas Chandler. She was also the first cousin of Free guitarist Paul Kossoff.

In the mid-1960s, Keith became well connected culturally in the early days of the "Swinging Sixties". She was photographed by David Bailey and, together with Sheila Klein, partner of the Rolling Stones' manager Andrew Loog Oldham, was at the heart of a bohemian community in London's West Hampstead. She formed relationships with Richards of the Stones and, later in New York City, Jimi Hendrix, but drifted into drug dependency. Richards appears to have been instrumental in Alan Keith's going out to America to find his daughter. On their return she was made a ward of court. She later brought up her own family and, in 2010, was living in New Orleans. According to Richards, Linda Keith was the subject of the Rolling Stones song "Ruby Tuesday". The song includes the lyrics "Who could hang a name on you? / when you change with every new day / Still I'm gonna miss you".

In the film Jimi: All Is by My Side it is suggested Jimi Hendrix wrote the song "Red House" about Keith.

== Personal life ==
Keith is married to musician and record producer John Porter.
