= Edlington attacks =

2009 child attacks in Edlington, England

- Location: Edlington, South Yorkshire, England
- Date: 9 April 2009
- Attack type: Child abduction
- Injuries: 2
- Charges: Attempted murder, robbery
- Verdict: Guilty

On 4 April 2009, an abduction and torture of two young boys by two young brothers occurred in Edlington, South Yorkshire, England. An 11-year-old boy was found with critical head injuries at a ravine in a rural area of Edlington, while his nine-year-old nephew was found wandering nearby covered in blood.

On Tuesday, 7 April, two brothers, aged 10 and 11, who had been arrested on Sunday, 5 April, were each initially charged with the attempted murder and robbery of both of the injured boys. They appeared at Sheffield Crown Court, where a hearing revealed the extent of their actions. They had led the two boys to an isolated wasteland where one was forced to strip naked and perform a sex act. A metal ring was used to strangle the other. The brothers collected stones and bricks which were thrown at the boys' heads. When alerted by the sound of passers-by, the suspects covered the two boys with a sheet, which they then set alight, inflicting burns on the victims. One brother had filmed part of the attack on his mobile phone, which was used as evidence in court.

The two suspects pleaded guilty to causing grievous bodily harm with intent, to robbing one of the boys of a mobile phone and the other of cash, to two counts of intentionally causing a child to engage in sexual activity, and to one additional charge of actual bodily harm relating to a previous incident involving another 11-year-old boy. A child protection expert, Eileen Vizard, who had been involved in the James Bulger case, told the sentencing judge that the younger brother was a "very high risk" to the community and was at risk of becoming "a seriously disturbed psychopathic offender" unless he was properly treated.

The brothers were given indeterminate sentences on 23 January 2010. The judge in the case, Mr Justice Keith, ordered that under Section 39 of the Children and Young Persons Act 1933 their identities should not be disclosed. A request to appeal against the sentence was refused by the Criminal Division of the Court of Appeal on 5 May 2010.

In December 2016, the perpetrators were granted legal lifelong anonymity on the grounds that they would be "at serious risk of attack" if their identities became known.

In August 2017, shortly after release, the younger of the brothers was returned to prison indefinitely after breaching the terms of his parole; he was found in possession of a machete.
