= Pic du Frêne =

Mountain in Savoie, France

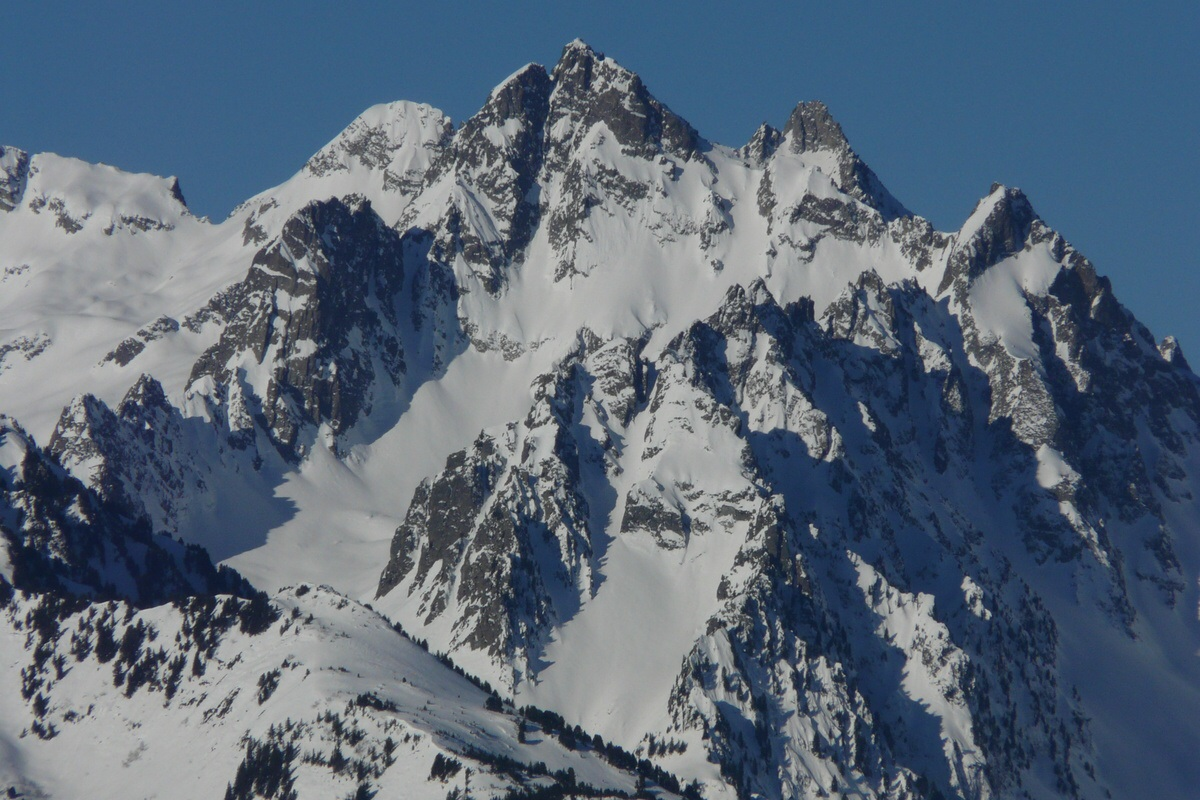

Highest point
- Elevation: 2,807 m (9,209 ft)
- Prominence: 520 m (1,710 ft)
- Coordinates: 45°21′09″N 06°11′53″E

Geography
- Location within France
- Location: Savoie, France
- Parent range: Belledonne Massif

Pic du Frêne (2,807 m) is a mountain in the Belledonne Massif in Savoie, France.
