= The Long Knife =

1958 British film by Montgomery Tully

- Australian daybill poster
- Directed by: Montgomery Tully
- Written by: Ian Stuart Black
- Based on: novel by Leslie Truss
- Produced by: Jack Greenwood
- Starring: Joan Rice; Sheldon Lawrence
- Edited by: Geoffrey Muller
- Color process: Black and white
- Production company: Merton Park Studios
- Distributed by: Anglo Amalgamated Film Distributors
- Release date: August 1958 (UK)
- Running time: 57 minutes
- Country: United Kingdom
- Language: English

The Long Knife is a 1958 British second feature ('B') crime film directed by Montgomery Tully and starring Joan Rice, Sheldon Lawrence and Victor Brooks. It was written by Ian Stuart Black based on the 1956 novel of the same title by Leslie Truss.

== Plot ==
Young nurse Jill Holden gets involved with an extortion gang targeting Mrs Cheam, one of her patients. Jill is implicated in a murder, and is helped by Mrs. Cheam's American lawyer Ross Waters. When Mrs. Cheam is murdered Jill becomes a suspect but is able clear herself with Ross's help. The real murderer is revealed to be a woman disguised as a man.

== Cast ==
- Joan Rice as Jill Holden
- Sheldon Lawrence as Ross Waters
- Dorothy Brewster as Angela
- Ellen Pollock as Mrs Cheam
- Victor Brooks as Superintendent Leigh
- Alan Keith as Doctor Ian Probus
- Arthur Gomez as Sergeant Bowles

== Critical reception ==
The Monthly Film Bulletin wrote: "Well turned-out crime thriller which suffers from an unlikely nurse as a heroine and a denouement which connoisseurs of the detective story might well consider obsolete."

Picture Show wrote: "Joan Rice and Sheldon Lawrence are convincing in the leading roles."

In British Sound Films: The Studio Years 1928–1959 David Quinlan rated the film as "average", writing: "Competent, lively thriller holds the interest, isn't too long."
