= Joan Rice =

English actress (1930–1997)

- Born: 3 February 1930; Derby, Derbyshire, England
- Died: 1 January 1997 (aged 66); Maidenhead, Berkshire, England
- Occupation: Actress

Joan Rice (3 February 1930 – 1 January 1997) was an English film actress.

Rice is best known for her role as Dalabo in the film His Majesty O'Keefe (1954) which co-starred Burt Lancaster. Apart from that she played Maid Marian in The Story of Robin Hood and His Merrie Men (1952), played the graverobber's wife in The Horror of Frankenstein and appeared in Operation Bullshine. For several years in the early and mid-1950s, Rice was considered one of 'Rank's top stars', then signed to Adelphi Films to make The Crowded Day.

Rice was reputedly discovered working as a waitress in a Lyons Corner House in London, where she was crowned "Miss Lyons, 1949"; and thereafter trained at the Rank Organisation's "charm school".

== Filmography ==
| Year | Title | Role | Notes |
|---|---|---|---|
| 1951 | Blackmailed | Alma | |
| 1951 | One Wild Oat | Annie (Maid) | |
| 1952 | The Story of Robin Hood and His Merrie Men | Maid Marian | |
| 1952 | Curtain Up | Avis | |
| 1952 | Gift Horse | June Mallory, WREN Cypher Clerk | |
| 1953 | The Steel Key | Doreen Wilson | |
| 1953 | A Day to Remember | Vera Mitchell | |
| 1954 | His Majesty O'Keefe | Dalabo aki Dali | |
| 1954 | The Crowded Day | Peggy | |
| 1955 | One Good Turn | Iris | |
| 1955 | Police Dog | Pat Lewis | |
| 1956 | Women Without Men | Cleo Thompson | U.S. title: Blonde Bait |
| 1958 | The Long Knife | Jill Holden | |
| 1959 | Operation Bullshine | Pvt. Finch | |
| 1961 | Payroll | Madge Moore | |
| 1970 | The Horror of Frankenstein | Graverobber's wife | (final film role) |
