= Belledonne =

Mountain range in the French Alps

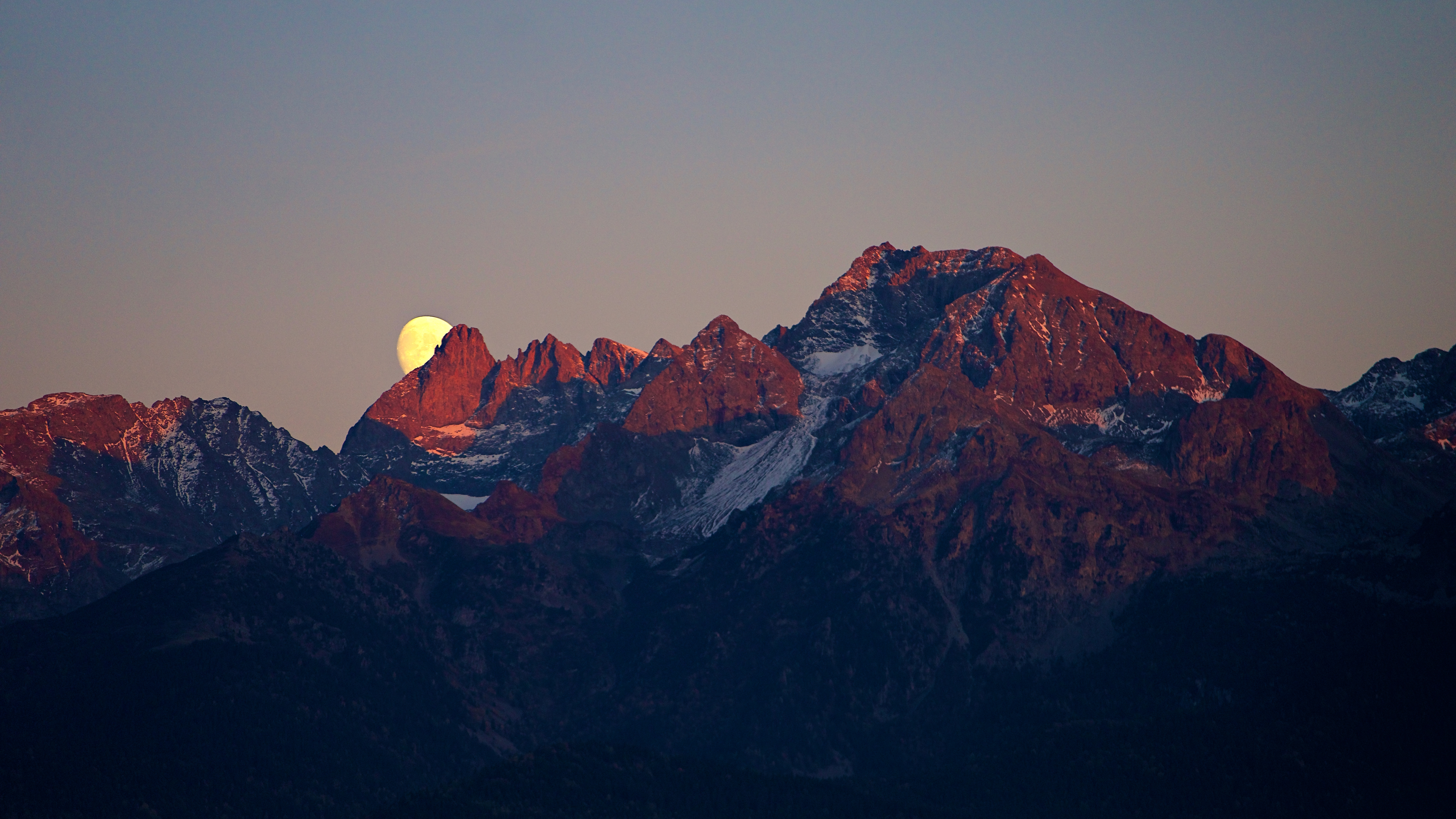
- The moon rises behind Belledonne's Grand Pic, to the left of Grande Lance de Domène

Highest point
- Peak: Grand Pic de Belledonne
- Elevation: 2,977 m (9,767 ft)
- Coordinates: 45°03′N 5°48′E

Dimensions
- Length: 60 km (37 mi)
- Width: 10 km (6.2 mi)

Geography
- Country: France
- Parent range: Dauphiné Alps

Belledonne (French: chaîne de Belledonne [ʃɛːn də bɛldɔn]) is a mountain range (French: massif) in the Dauphiné Alps (part of the French Alps) in southeast France. The southern end of the range forms the eastern wall of the mountains that surround the city of Grenoble.

The range is noted for the spectacular scenery it provides the inhabitants of Grenoble, numerous ski areas, interesting geology, and a diverse range of alpine land types and uses.

== Geography ==
The Belledonne range is approximately 60 km (37 mi) long by between 10 km (6.2 mi) wide and runs from roughly 45°03′N 5°48′E, 16 km (9.9 mi) south-south-east of the city of Grenoble, in a north-easterly direction (actually 35 degrees) for 65 km (40 mi) to roughly 45°33′N 6°17′E, near the town of Aiguebelle. The highest point is the Grand Pic de Belledonne, 2,977 m (9,767 ft).

The range is delineated by several valleys which lie at relatively low altitude, including the Grésivaudan Valley (which carries the Isère) on the west, the river Arc to the north and the Romanche to the south. The range counts dozens of peaks over 2,500 m (8,200 ft), more than 10 glaciers, and many alpine lakes, the highest of which is over 2,400 m (7,900 ft) above sea level.

Geologically, Belledonne is a concatenation of ranges which are not physically separated; from north to south, these are: the Grand Arc, the Lauzière, the Sept-Laux, Belledonne proper, and the Taillefer.

Belledonne is a crystalline range. It initiated as a Paleozoic peneplain which was covered by Mesozoic sediments, then raised and tilted during the Tertiary uplift of the Alps and subjected to glacial erosion during the Quaternary. As a result of its geologic history, Belledonne alternates jagged peaks with gentle slopes.

Belledonne overlooks the fairly flat Isère Valley (French: Grésivaudan) which lies only 220 m (720 ft) above sea level near Grenoble. Hence, all alpine vegetation zones are represented:

- Hill zone: coppices of Downy oak on South facing slopes (French: adret), hornbeam, common maple.
- Montane zone: beech, birch, aspen, English oak, sycamore maple, goat willow, then fir and spruce.
- Subalpine zone: moors and sparse stands of spruce, mugho pine, stone pine, and silver birch.
- Alpine zone: grassland, scree and rock.

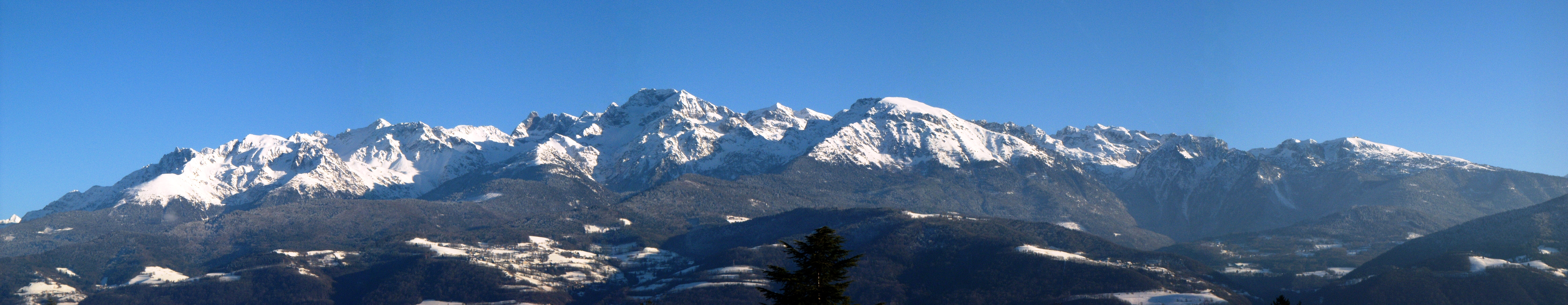
Panoramic view of Belledonne and of its "balcony".

A significant feature is the Belledonne Balcony (French: Le Balcon de Belledonne), a terrace or plateau some 30 km long on the western side of the range that provides a relatively level area intersected by narrow ravines eroded by rivers taking runoff from the snow levels higher up. The Balcony has supported diverse livestock-raising and other agricultural activity for a considerable period of time, and its Southern part is now effectively an upscale suburb of Grenoble.

=== Main summits ===
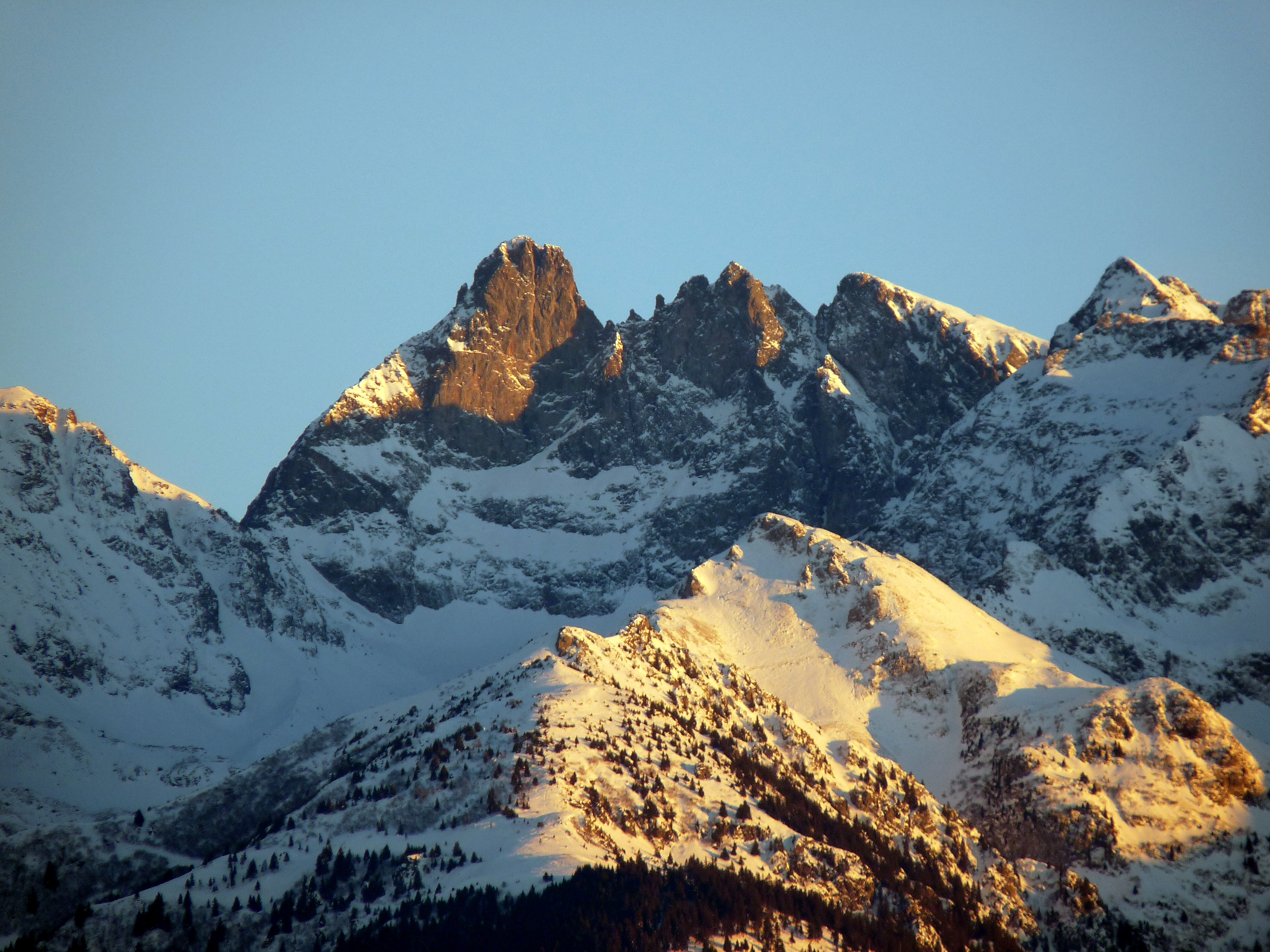
Grand Pic de Belledonne, seen from Biviers.

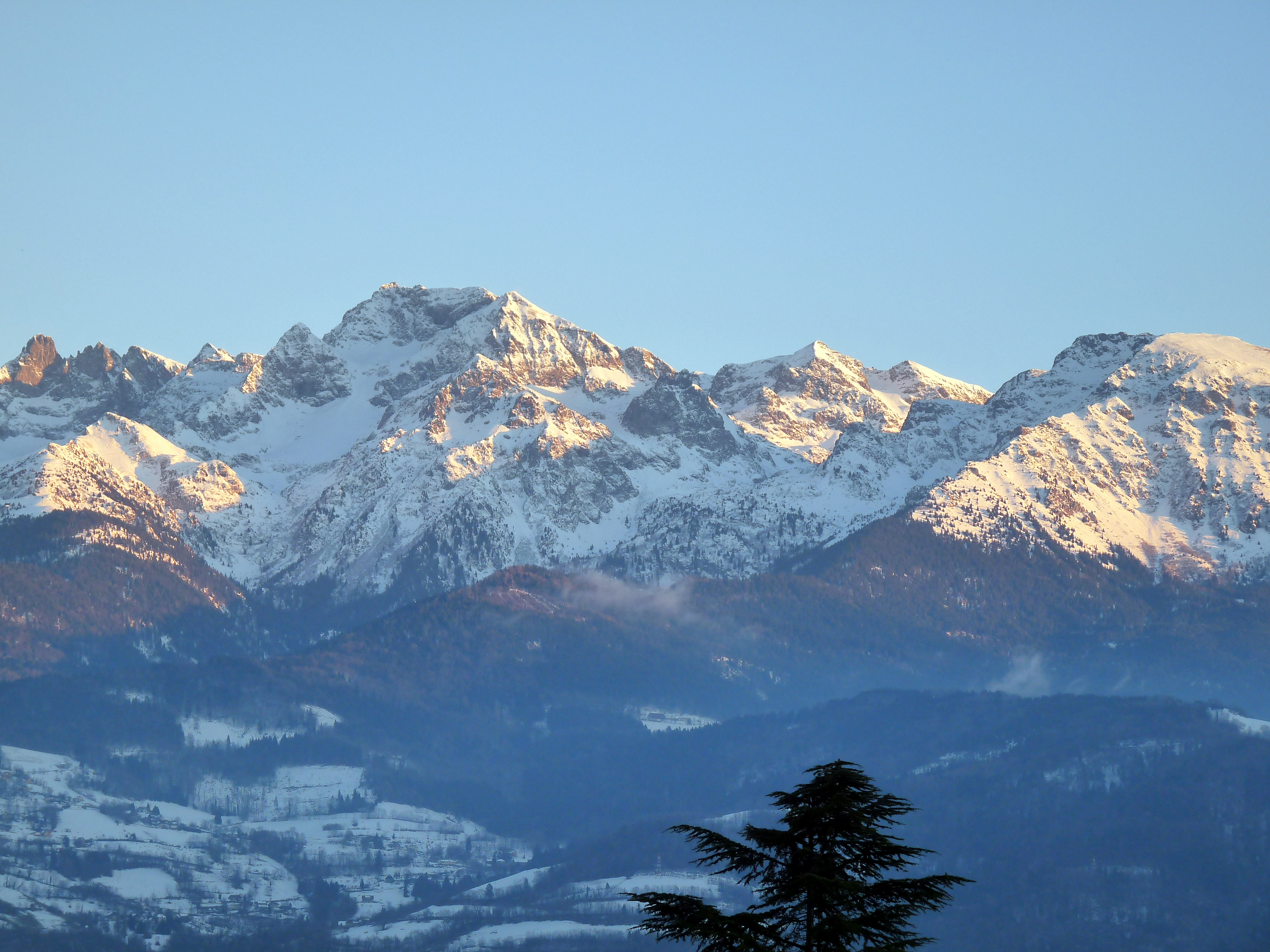
Grande Lance de Domène, seen from Biviers.

Name	Elevation
Grand Pic de Belledonne (Le)	2,977 m (9,767 ft)
Croix de Belledonne (La)	2,929 m (9,610 ft)
Rocher Blanc (Le)	2,927 m (9,603 ft)
Aiguilles de l'Argentière (Les)	2,915 m (9,564 ft)
Rocher Badon (Le)	2,912 m (9,554 ft)
Pyramide (La)	2,912 m (9,554 ft)
Puy Gris (Le)	2,908 m (9,541 ft)
Bec d'Arguille (Le)	2,891 m (9,485 ft)
Aiguille d'Olle (L')	2,885 m (9,465 ft)
Rocher d'Arguille (Le)	2,885 m (9,465 ft)
Pointe de Comberousse (La)	2,866 m (9,403 ft)
Grande Lance d'Allemond (La)	2,842 m (9,324 ft)
Charmet de l'Aiguille (Le)	2,826 m (9,272 ft)
Pointe de la Porte d'Eglise (La)	2,812 m (9,226 ft)
Pic du Frêne (Le)	2,807 m (9,209 ft)
Pic du Grand Doménon (Le)	2,802 m (9,193 ft)
Grand Morétan (Le)	2,800 m (9,200 ft)
Grande Lance de Domène (La)	2,790 m (9,150 ft)
Grand Charnier d'Allemont (Le)	2,777 m (9,111 ft)
Pic Couttet (Le)	2,764 m (9,068 ft)
Grand Crozet (Le)	2,762 m (9,062 ft)
Pic de la Grande Valloire (Le)	2,758 m (9,049 ft)
Selle du Puy Gris (La)	2,758 m (9,049 ft)
Rocher de l'Homme (Le)	2,755 m (9,039 ft)
Roche Rousse	2,753 m (9,032 ft)
Pic Lamartine (Le)	2,752 m (9,029 ft)
Grande Lauzière (La)	2,741 m (8,993 ft)

=== Main glaciers ===
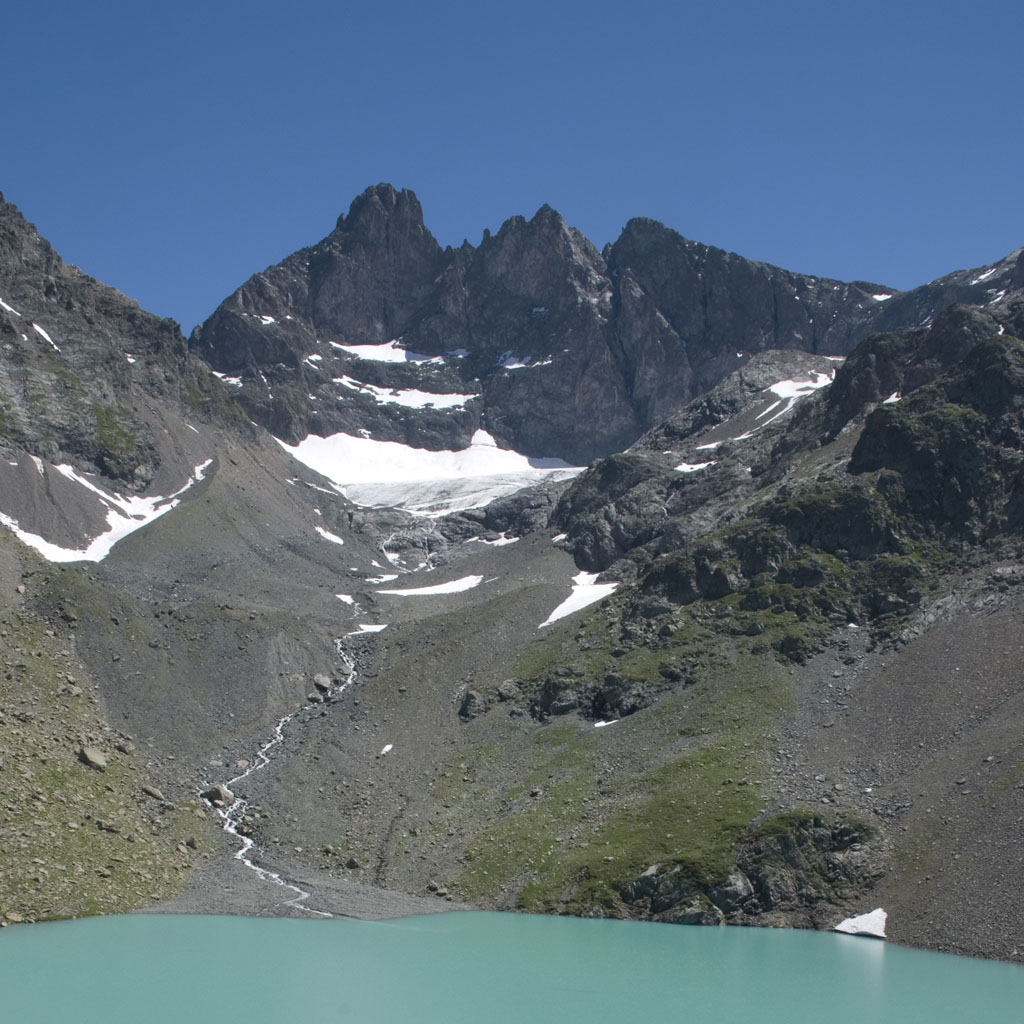
Glacier de Freydane, below the 3 peaks of Belledonne, July 2007.

The most spectacular glacier in Belledonne is the French: Glacier de Freydane, which is noted for its crevasses.

- Glacier de la Sitre
- Glacier de Freydane
- Glacier de l'Amiante
- Glacier du Rocher Blanc
- Glacier de la Combe Madame
- Glacier de l'Argentière
- Glacier d'Arguille
- Glacier du Puy Gris
- Glacier du Gleyzin
- Glacier de Claran

=== Main passes ===
No road cuts across Belledonne. The Pas de la Coche pass, between Belledonne proper and the 7 Laux range, is the only natural break point in the range, and is the only point below 2,000 m (6,600 ft) on the Belledonne ridge (the main water divide between the Isère and the Romanche). Most other passes are not much lower in elevation than their neighboring peaks. At the turn of the 20th century, Joseph Paganon, a minister in several French governments, pushed for linking Laval to the Rivier-d'Allemond by road through the Pas de la Coche. That roadwork started but eventually stopped after Paganon's death at an elevation of 1,336 m (4,383 ft) on the Gresivaudan side, while work never started on the steeper other side (Eau d'Olle). Before the automobile era, locals frequently used this pass to go from Gresivaudan to the Eau d'Olle valley, or to continue to the Maurienne valley via the Glandon pass. Hannibal may have passed the Pas de la Coche when he crossed the Alps with his army.

Name	Elevation
Pra (Col de la )	2,171 m (7,123 ft)
Belledonne (Col de)	2,785 m (9,137 ft)
Freydanne (Col de)	2,645 m (8,678 ft)
Mine de Fer (Col de la)	2,400 m (7,900 ft)
Roche Fendue (Brèche de)	2,482 m (8,143 ft)
Coche (Pas de la)	1,989 m (6,526 ft)
Sept Laux (Col des)	2,184 m (7,165 ft)
Croix (Col de la)	2,529 m (8,297 ft)
Tepey (Col du)	2,716 m (8,911 ft)
Valloire (Col de la)	2,751 m (9,026 ft)
Merlet (Col du)	2,286 m (7,500 ft)
Bourbière (Col de la)	2,352 m (7,717 ft)
Frèche (Col de la)	2,183 m (7,162 ft)
Perrière (Col de la)	2,003 m (6,572 ft)
Perche (Col de la)	1,984 m (6,509 ft)
Roche Noire (Col de)	2,629 m (8,625 ft)
Balmette (Col de la)	2,667 m (8,750 ft)

=== Main lakes ===
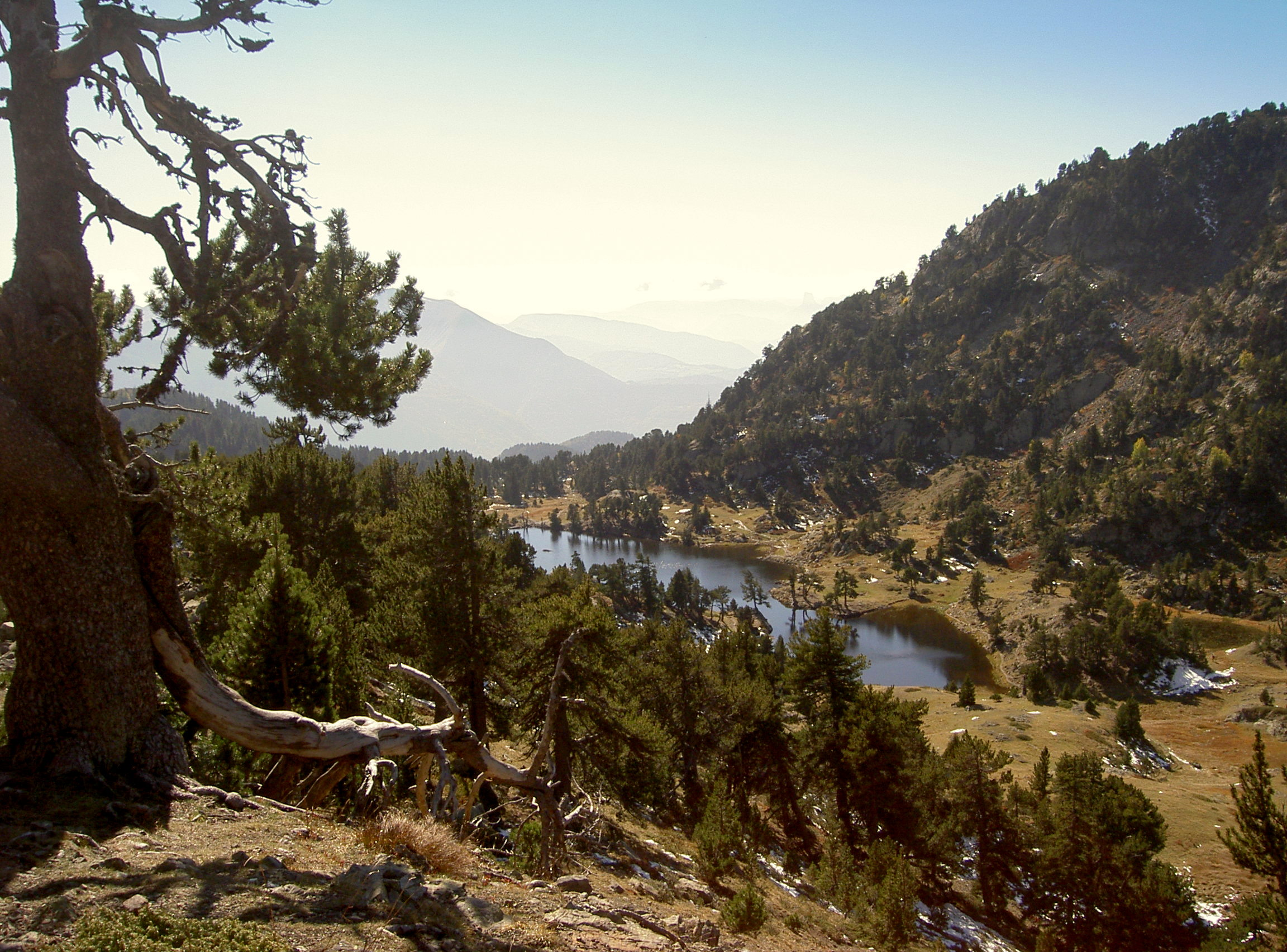
Lake Achard in October 2005.

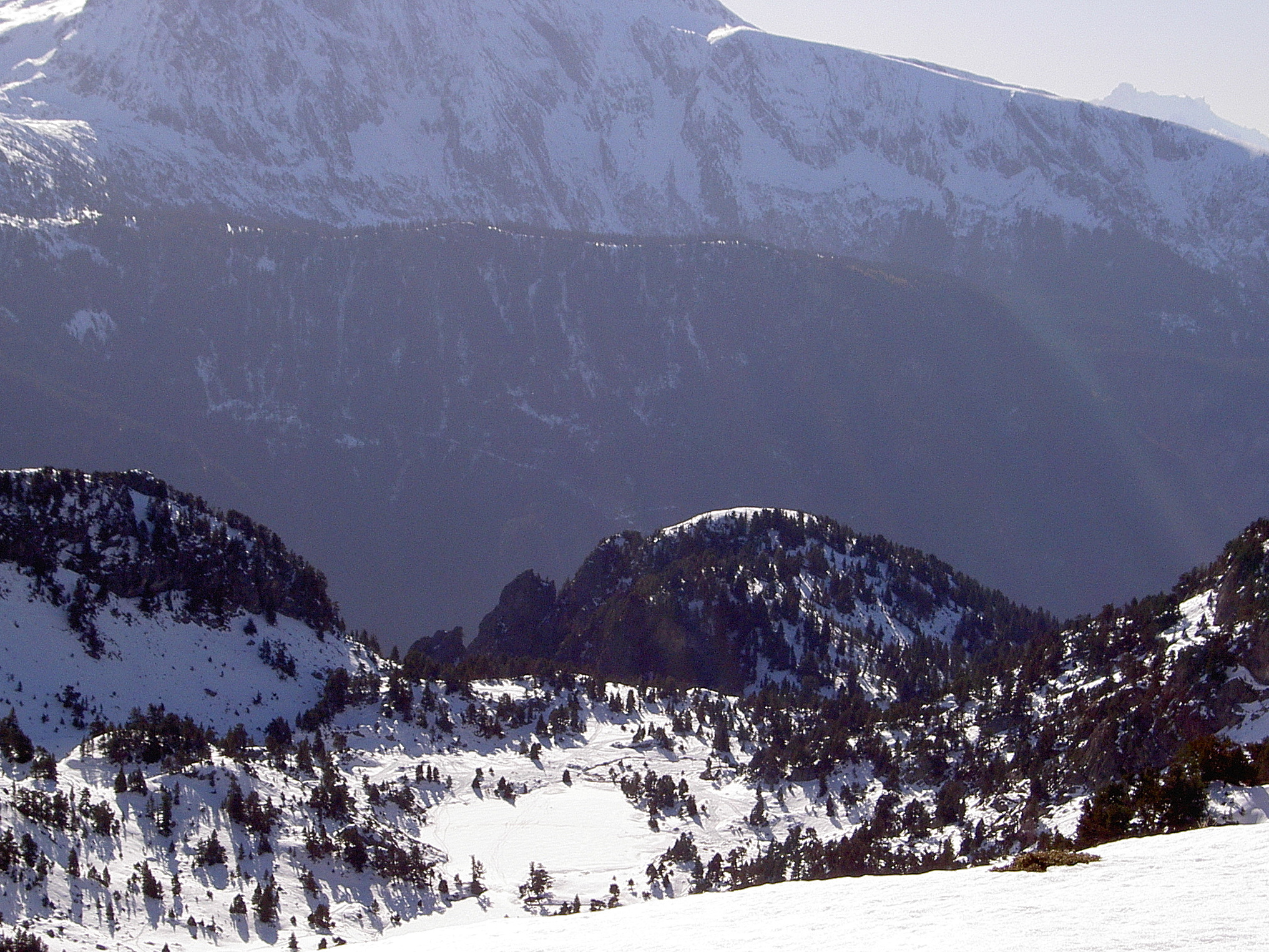
Lake Achard in October 2003.

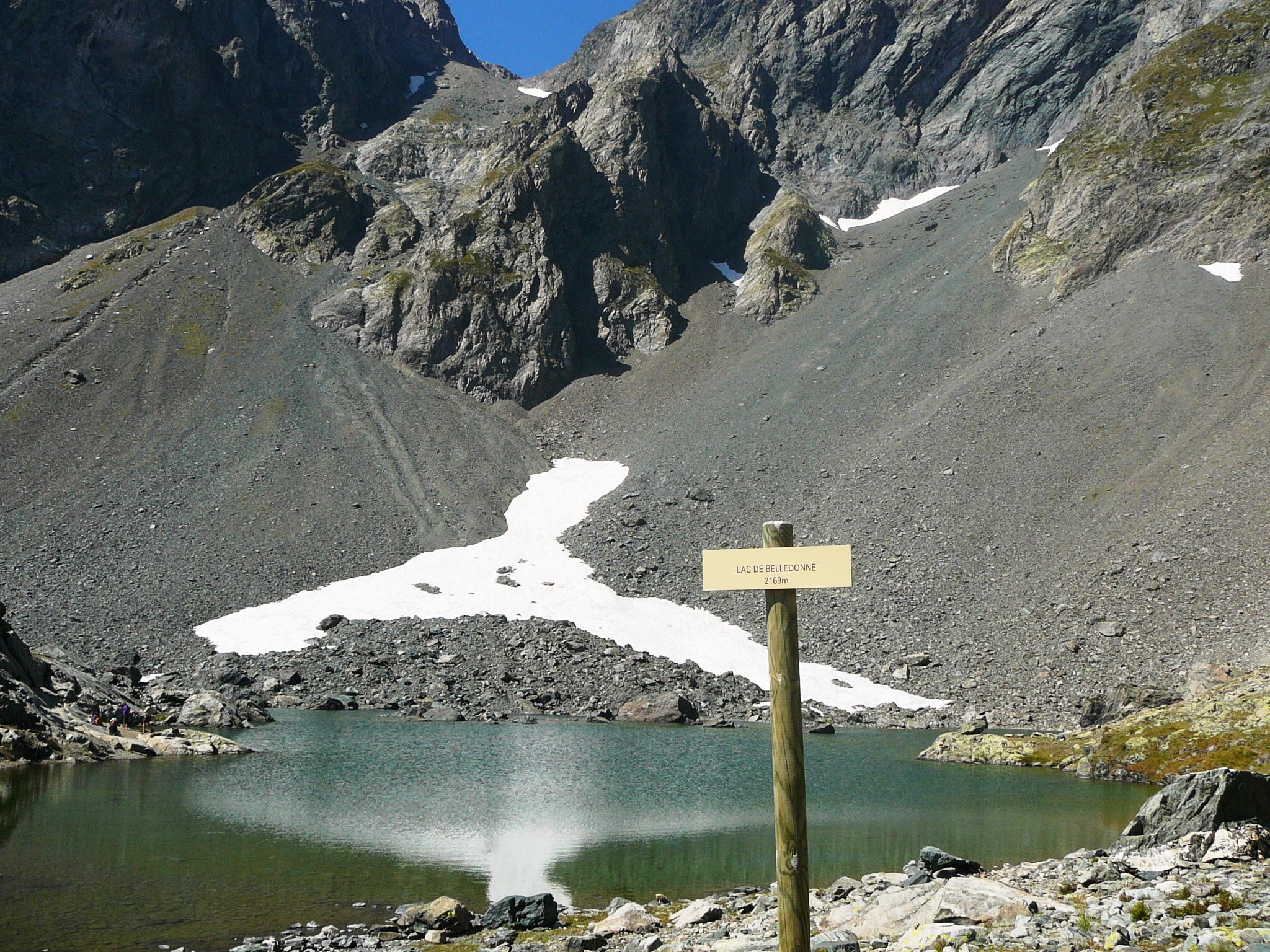
Lake Belledonne in September 2007.

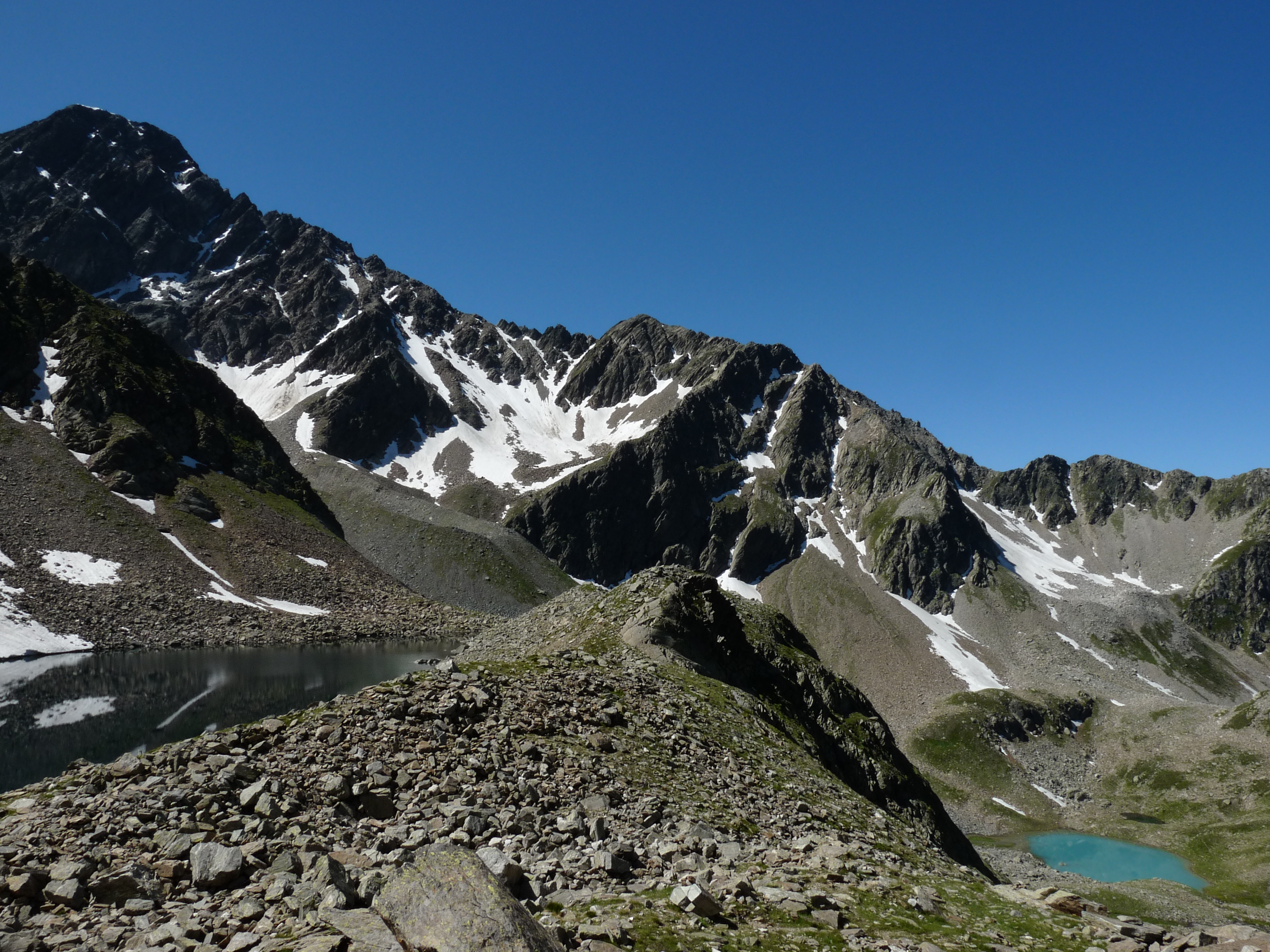
Lake Noir (2268m) and Blanc (2124m) below Rocher d'Arguille (2885m).

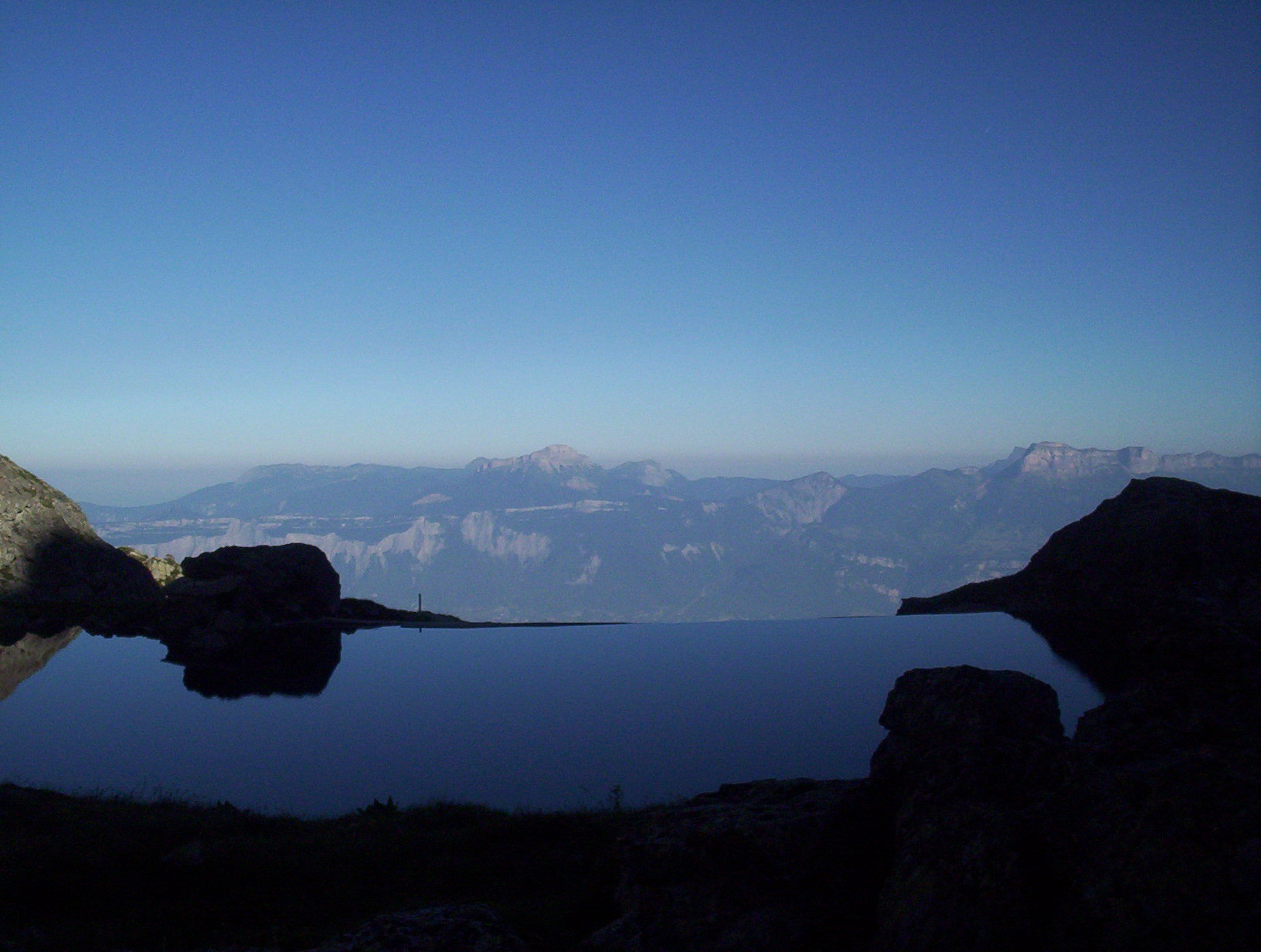
Lake Crozet in 2003.

Belledonne and its lakes have played a major role in industrializing hydroelectricity production as early as 1869 thanks to pioneer Aristide Bergès and his paper mills which tapped water from lake Crozet.

Name	Elevation	Group
Achard (Lac)	1,917 m (6,289 ft)	
Robert (Lac)	1,998 m (6,555 ft)	
Longet (Lac)	2,027 m (6,650 ft)	
Merlat (Lac)	2,044 m (6,706 ft)	
Crozet (Lac du)	1,974 m (6,476 ft)	
Petit Doménon (Lac du)	2,380 m (7,810 ft)	
Grand Doménon (Lac du)	2,385 m (7,825 ft)	
Sitre (Lac de la)	1,952 m (6,404 ft)	
Belledonne (Lac de)	2,163 m (7,096 ft)	
Blanc (Lac)	2,161 m (7,090 ft)	
Crop (Lac de)	1,906 m (6,253 ft)	
Agnelin (Lac de l')	2,327 m (7,635 ft)	
Jeplan (Lac)	2,144 m (7,034 ft)	
Sagne (Lac de la)	2,065 m (6,775 ft)	
Croix (Lac de la)	2,415 m (7,923 ft)	
Folle (Lac de la)	2,142 m (7,028 ft)	
Blanc (Lac)	2,124 m (6,969 ft)	
Noir (Lac)	2,268 m (7,441 ft)	
Balmettes (Lac des)	2,196 m (7,205 ft)	
Corne (Lac de la)	2,083 m (6,834 ft)	7 Laux
Cos (Lac du)	2,182 m (7,159 ft)	7 Laux
Blanc (Lac)	2,248 m (7,375 ft)	7 Laux
Cottepens (Lac)	2,128 m (6,982 ft)	7 Laux
Carré (Lac)	2,128 m (6,982 ft)	7 Laux
Motte (Lac de la)	2,128 m (6,982 ft)	7 Laux
Noir (Lac)	2,091 m (6,860 ft)	7 Laux

== Ski resorts ==
There are 4 main ski resorts in Belledonne, from South to North:

- Chamrousse
- Le Collet d'Allevard
- Les Sept Laux
- L'Espace Nordique du Barioz

== Origin of the name ==
The origin of the name is not clear. The phrase belle donne means beautiful women in Italian. It does not appear to mean that in Arpitan, and since Arpitan is the ancient regional language, would have been a more likely source of ancient names than Italian. Nevertheless, from one angle the highest peak, the Grand Pic du Belledonne allegedly looks like a woman holding a baby. Other suggested derivations are from the Celtic donne meaning valley, hence beautiful valleys, or indo-European bal, meaning elevated rock, which evolved into bel, then belle. It is difficult without evidence to determine the validity of these derivations.

== Fauna ==
The mountains are home to marmots, chamois, ibex mountain goats and grouse. Reportedly, wolves have returned since 1998, coming from Italy and the press regularly echoes complaints from shepherds about wolves attacking their sheep.

The ibex had completely disappeared from Belledonne. Early 1983, 13 females and 7 males were brought in from Switzerland and by spring 2002, their population had risen to 900 heads.

== Gallery ==
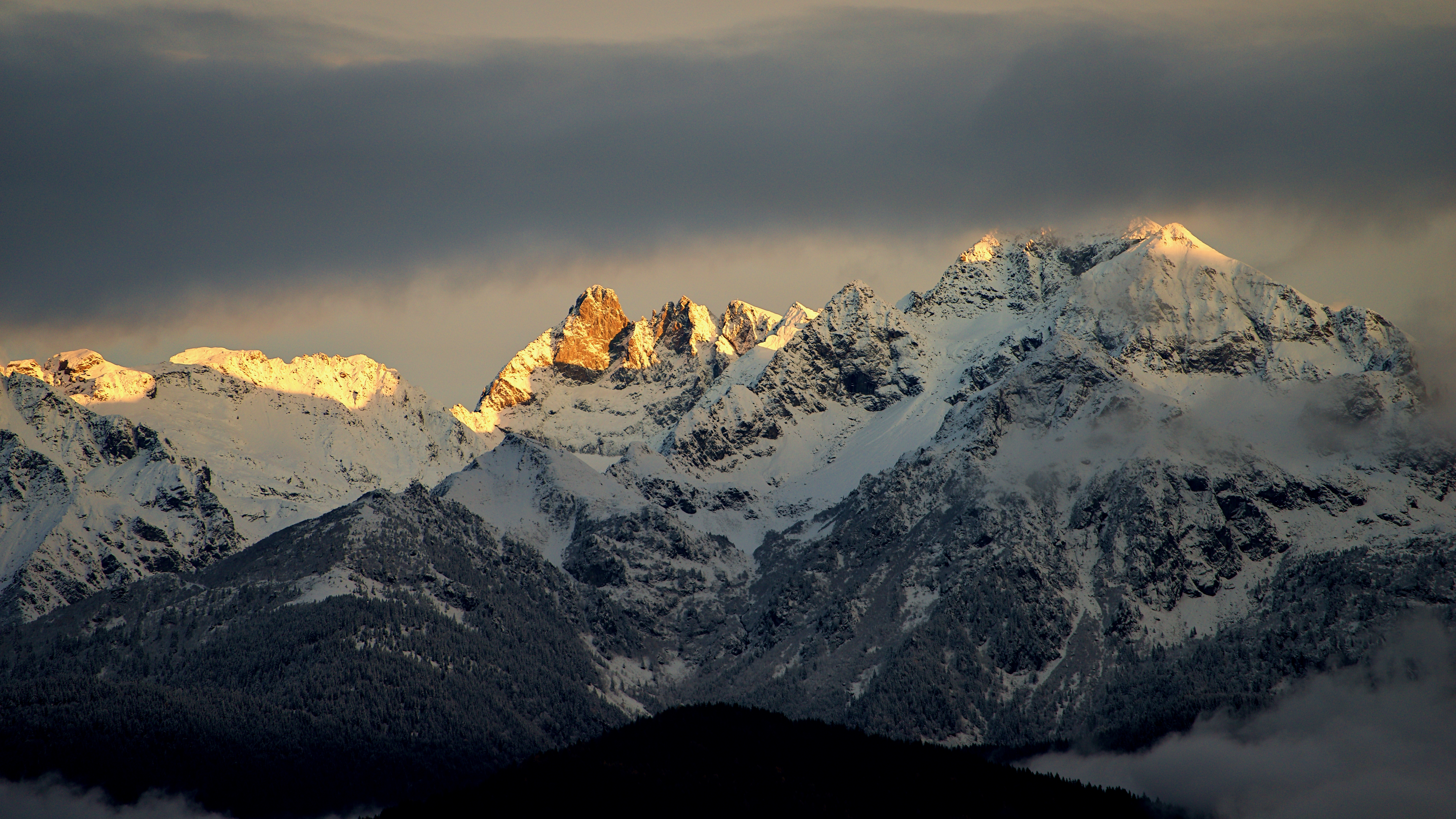
Sunset on Grand Pic de Belledonne

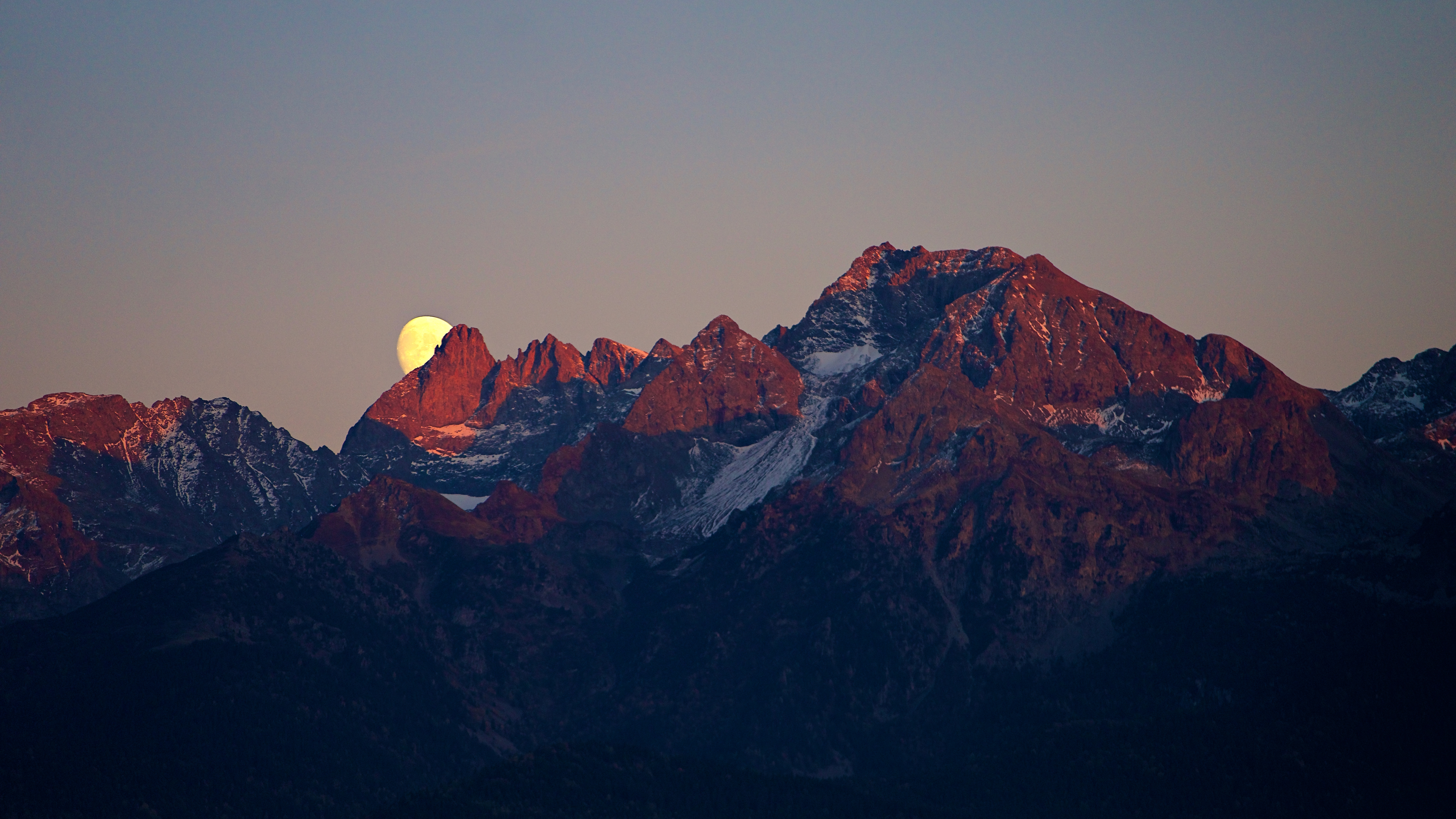
Moonrise on Grand Pic de Belledonne

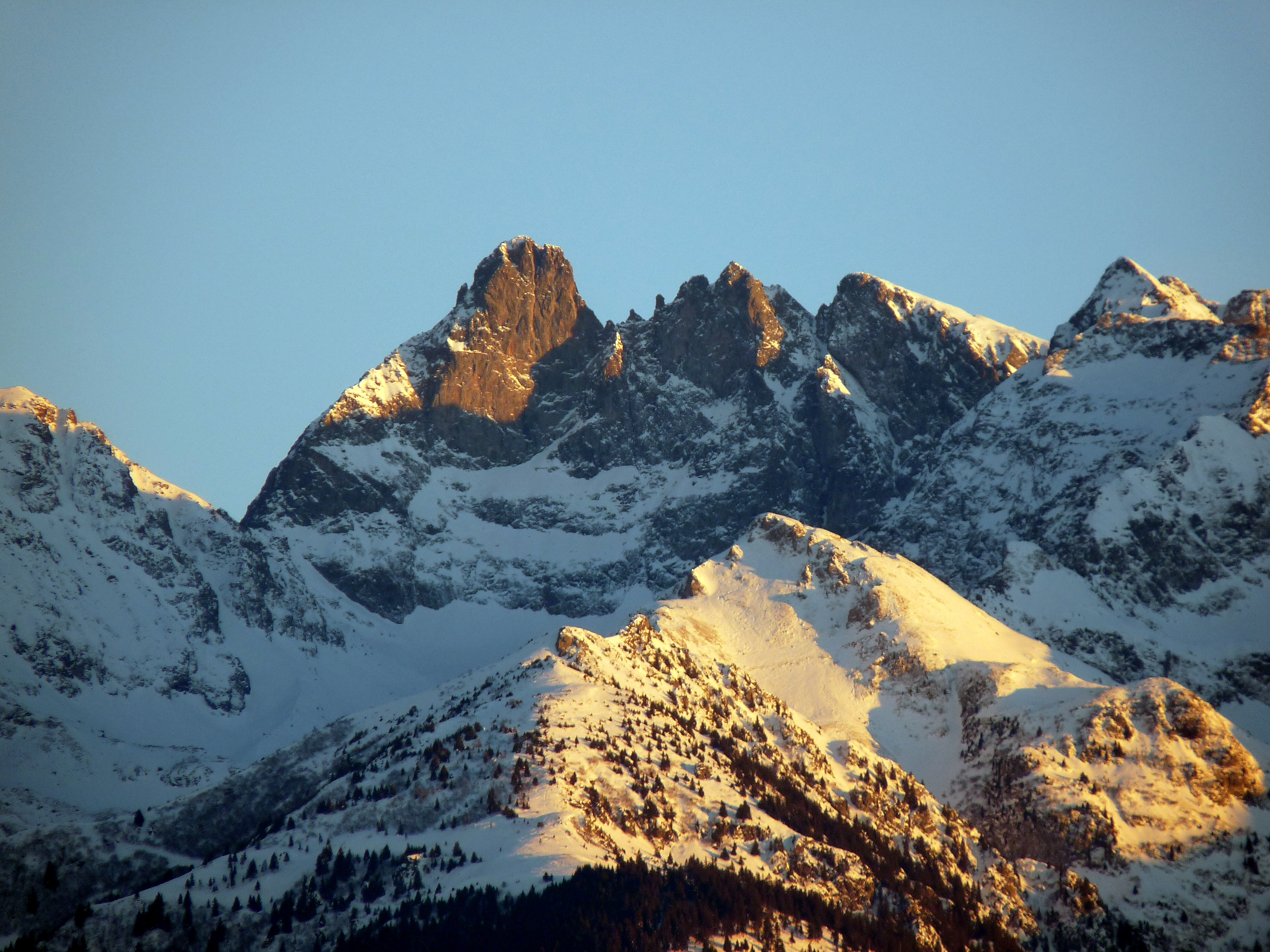
Grand Pic de Belledonne seen from the West

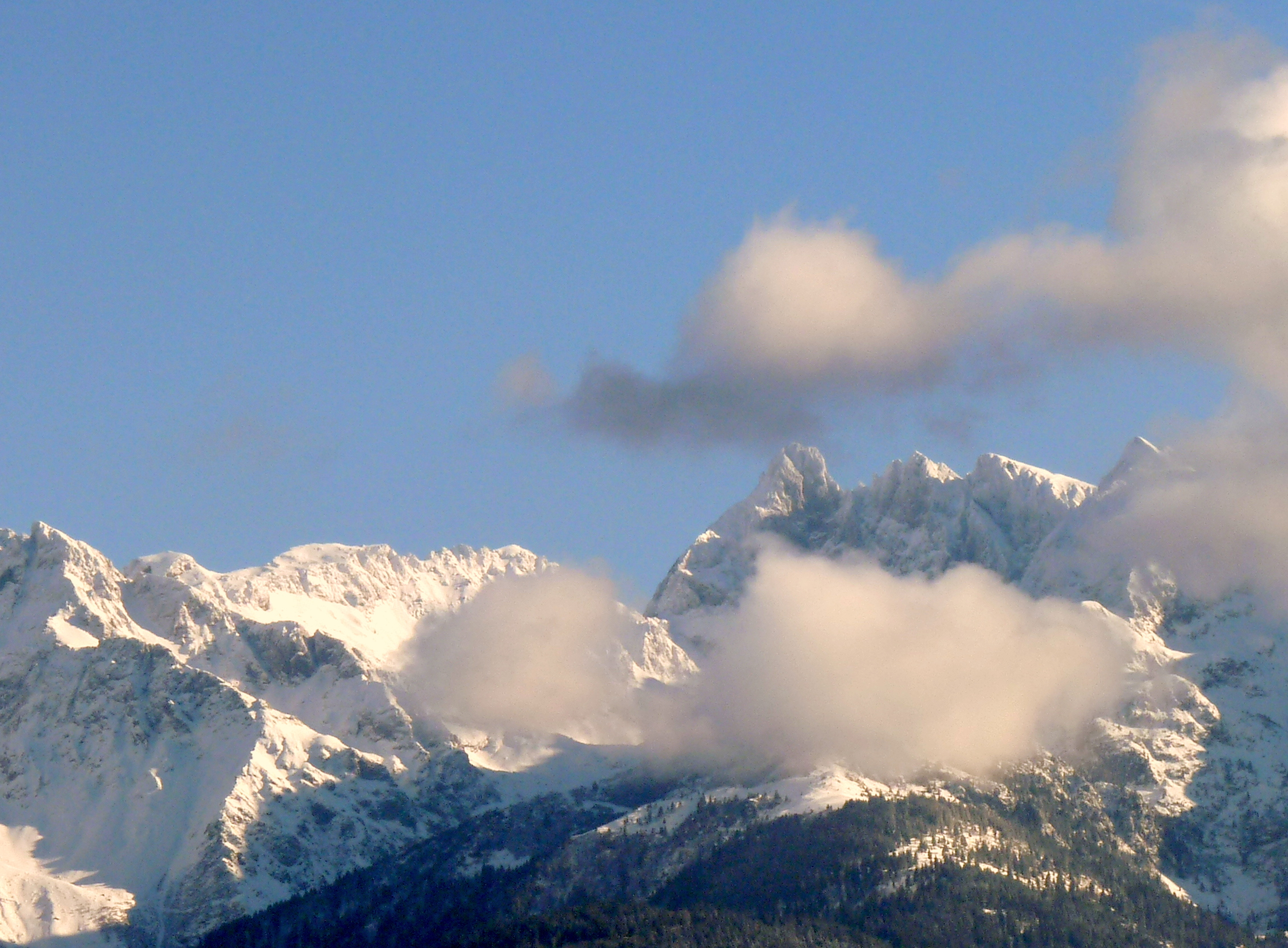
Clouds clear up and reveal Grand Pic de Belledonne
