= Yorkshire Main Colliery =

Former coal mine in South Yorkshire, England

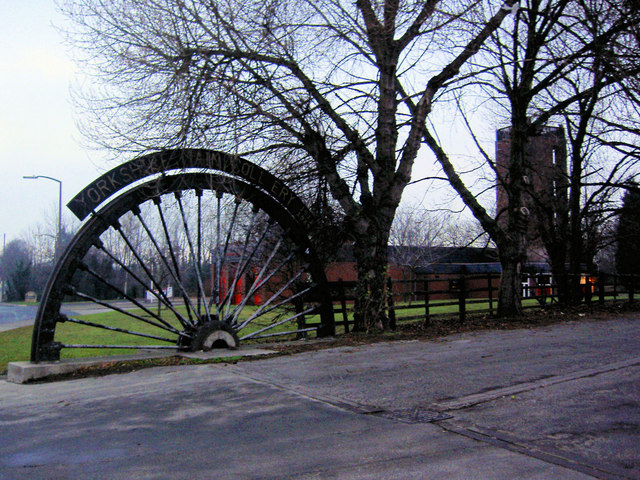
- Winding wheel installed as a monument in Edlington

- Location within South Yorkshire
- Location: Edlington, Doncaster, South Yorkshire, England; 53.4862°N 1.1815°W
- Products: Coal
- Production: 908,000 tonnes (1,001,000 tons)
- Financial year: 1951
- Opened: 1909
- Closed: 11 October 1985

Yorkshire Main Colliery was a coal mine situated within the village of Edlington, south west of Doncaster, South Yorkshire, England.

== History ==
The colliery was created by the Staveley Coal and Iron Company, which bought land in Edlington and leased the right to exploit the coal reserves under this and adjoining land from the Battie-Wrightson of Cusworth estate in several transactions in 1909 and 1910. William Wrightson of Cusworth had acquired the Edlington estate in 1803 from the Molesworth family, which had owned it since the late seventeenth century.

Two shafts were sunk in 1909 and 1910. The new colliery, originally known as "Edlington Main" had a name change in September 1911 and became "Yorkshire Main". It reached the Barnsley seam at a depth of 905 yards in July 1911, however this was on a fault. The main seam was relocated in October 1912. The Colliery first produced a million tons of coal in 1923 and in 1939 it achieved a record output of 1,138,512 tons. In 1937, the pit became part of the Doncaster Amalgamated Collieries Ltd company, and was nationalised into the National Coal Board in 1947.

Extraction of the Dunsil seam, about 18 yards lower, began in the 1950s. In the 1970s work started on a new seam, the Swallow Wood Seam, with and area of about 1.5 by 3 miles (2.4 by 4.8 km). Plans had also been made to open up the Parkgate seam, but these were later abandoned. In 1984, the mine was recorded as making a profit of £4.5 million, however, the mine was closed in 1985. In 1987, the 200-foot (61 m) headstock winding tower, which cost £6 million, was demolished.

The colliery had a war memorial sited at the main entrance to commemorate those who worked at Yorkshire Main who died in the First World War. The memorial was moved into the village of Edlington in the 1970s. In 2018, part of the surface of the old colliery was granted approval for the building of 375 homes.

Arthur Wharton, the first black professional player in the Football League, worked as a collier there after his retirement from playing in 1902.

== See also ==
- Neighbouring pits: Rossington Colliery to the east, Maltby Main Colliery (south); Silverwood Colliery (south-west); and Cadeby Colliery (west).
- List of collieries in Yorkshire 1984-present with dates of closure
- Yorkshire Main F.C.
