= Isabella Charlet-Straton =

British mountain climber

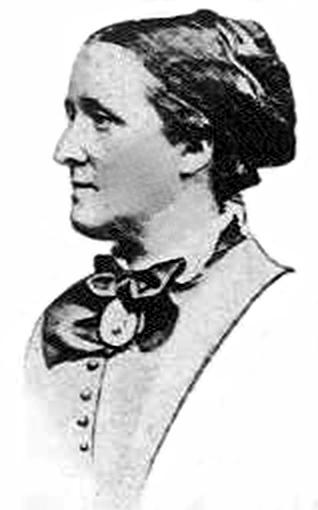

Personal information
- Nationality: British
- Born: 28 August 1838 Willsbridge, England
- Died: 12 April 1918 (aged 79) La Roche-sur-Foron, France

Climbing career
- Type of climber: Mountaineer
- First ascents: Aiguille du Moine
- Named routes: Pointe Isabella, Pointe de la Persévérance
- Known for: first winter ascent of Mont Blanc

Mary Isabella Charlet-Straton (née Straton; 28 August 1838 – 12 April 1918) was a British female mountain climber. She made several first ascents in the Alps with her 2nd cousin Emmeline Lewis Lloyd as well as the first winter ascent of Mont Blanc with her future husband Jean Charlet in January 1876. The peak Pointe Isabella was named in her honour after she had taken part in its first ascent.

== Biography ==
=== Early years ===
Straton was born in Willsbridge, England in 1838. When she was eight years old she moved to Kingston upon Hull and relocated again at the age of seventeen to London in pursuit of a better education. Following the deaths of her parents and sisters, she inherited the Straton family fortune in her twenties, becoming financially independent with an income of roughly £4,000 per year.

=== Career ===
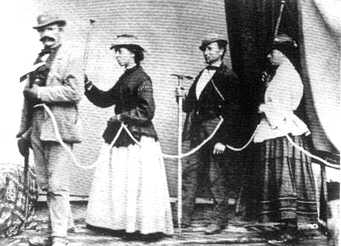
(l to r) unknown, Emmeline Lewis Lloyd, Charlet and Isabella Straton - alpine climbers

Straton was introduced to climbing through her friend Emmeline Lewis Lloyd, with whom she travelled throughout the Alps and Pyrenees on hiking and climbing expeditions in the 1860s–70s. One of their first climbs was an attempt on the Matterhorn in 1869. In 1870 they became one of the first women to climb Monte Viso and the following year did make the first ascent of Aiguille du Moine. When Lewis-Lloyd retired from climbing in 1873, Straton climbed with Jean Charlet, a French mountain guide from Chamonix who had accompanied her and Lewis-Lloyd on their previous expeditions.

Straton and Charlet climbed together for twenty years and eventually married. Some of the ascents they made together included the Aiguille du Midi, the Aiguille de Blaitière, the Dents du Midi, and the Dom. In 1875 they made the first ascent of a peak on the Aiguille de Triolet, which Charlet named Pointe Isabella. This peak actually has two summits joined by a small ridge. The northern peak in 3,761 metres (12,339 ft) high and is the usual one that is climbed. They climbed a new peak in the Aiguilles Rouges in 1881, which they named Pointe de la Persévérance in honour of "the perseverance that they had shown before they had dared to confess their affection for one another".

Straton climbed Mont Blanc four times. This included the first winter ascent in January 1876, accompanied by Charlet and Sylvain Couttet. This feat was published in local and foreign newspapers which turned Straton into a climbing celebrity.

=== Personal life ===
Straton and Charlet married in November 1876, both adopting the surname Charlet-Straton, and settled in Argentière, Chamonix. They had two sons whom they encouraged to take up climbing; one climbed Mont Blanc at the age of thirteen and the other at eleven. One of their sons, Robert, was killed in World War I in 1915. Straton died in 1918 in La Roche-sur-Foron, Haute Savoie, and was buried in Argentière. When Straton and Charlet's grandchildren opened a hotel in Chamonix, they named it Pointe Isabelle in memory of Straton.
