= Murder of Zahid Mubarek =

2000 murder in England

Zahid Mubarek was a British Pakistani teenager who was murdered by his cellmate, Robert Stewart, on Tuesday 21 March 2000 at the Feltham Young Offenders' Institution in West London. He was already inside Feltham when his murderer was transferred to his cell.

== Victim ==
Zahid Mubarek's family trace their roots to Pakistan. His grandfather, who served in the Pakistan Army Corps of Engineers migrated with his family to East London in 1960. Zahid was born in 1980 and was the eldest of three children; his father worked as a manager in a factory for 28 years. The family came from a Muslim background and had no previous confrontations or records with the police before Zahid's case.

=== Prison ===
Mubarek was a first-time prisoner and was five hours from the end of a 90-day sentence at the time of the murder.

According to HM Inspectorate of Prisons: "His brushes with the law occurred to fund a growing dependence on drugs. Over a period of less than 10 months, he committed 11 offences, mostly for breaking into cars and stealing from them. He was given a number of opportunities to co-operate in the search for a suitable community sentence, but he failed to keep many appointments which had been made for him to meet members of the community drugs team and other agencies, and on two occasions he did not turn up at court. Eventually, on 17 January 2000, he was sentenced to 90 days’ detention in a young offender institution for a total of five offences, and a few weeks later he received a similar term to be served concurrently for four further offences. He served the whole of his sentence at Feltham."

== Perpetrator ==
Robert Stewart was born in 1980 in Greater Manchester. At the time of the murder he had 17 criminal convictions, out of 80 offences, and was awaiting trial on charges of harassment. He was thought to have played a part in the murder of another inmate by one of his friends, but was never charged. Guards at various prisons reported Stewart had clear mental health issues and mental nurse Chris Kinealy diagnosed him as a psychopath in November 1999.

== Murder ==
On 8 February 2000, Stewart was moved into Swallow Unit and placed in the only available bed, in Mubarek's cell. Reportedly the guard responsible had no idea who Stewart was or that he was a known racist, having not been given access to his security files. Mubarek, who was trying to sleep ahead of his release the following morning, complained the light in the cell was too bright; Stewart responded to this by throwing a pair of underpants over the cell lamp. At 3.35am on the morning of 21 March, Stewart took a table leg that he had already broken off the table two weeks earlier and battered his sleeping cellmate over the head. Mubarek was hit between seven and eleven times before Stewart pressed the alarm and waited for the prison officers to arrive. Once they did, he claimed his cellmate had an accident and was immediately moved to a nearby cell where he washed his blood-stained hands and clothes before a forensic team could isolate any evidence. Mubarek was taken to Charing Cross Hospital in west London, arriving four hours later, where he died.

Despite Stewart's attempt to destroy evidence, he was charged with Mubarek's murder. Prison guards reported that when they arrived at Mubarek's cell Stewart had been standing over him covered in blood and holding a large table leg. He had also written a message on the wall of the cell he was moved to reading "Just killed me padmate", signed off with a swastika. Stewart was convicted of murder in November 2000 and sentenced to life imprisonment.

== Inquiry ==
The unprecedented decision by the Law Lords to order Home Secretary David Blunkett to hold a public inquiry into the murder was heralded a huge victory for the dead teenager's family. Despite the family's four-year wait for the inquiry, some evidence is already in the public domain after the Commission for Racial Equality conducted its own investigation.

Evidence presented at the later murder trial revealed Stewart to be a seriously disturbed individual. The inquiry stated that Zahid Mubarek died because of a combination of his cellmate's racism and failures of the Prison Service.

== See also ==
- Murder of Stephen Lawrence
- Murder of Ross Parker
