= Grésivaudan =

Valley in France

Coordinates: 45.3167°N 5.95°E

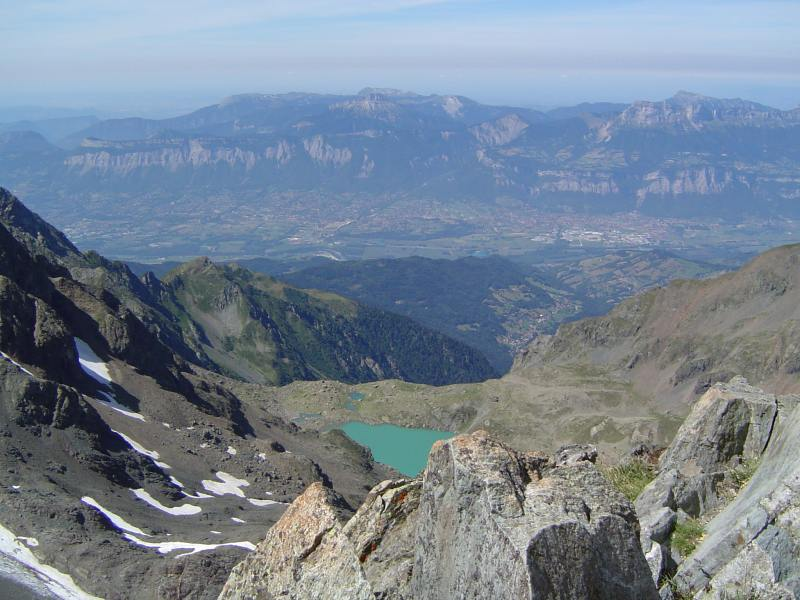
Valley of Grésivaudan

The Grésivaudan (French pronunciation: [ɡʁezivodɑ̃]; sometimes Graisivaudan) is a valley of the French Alps, situated mostly in the Isère. Etymologically, Graisivaudan comes from roots meaning "Grenoble" (Gratianopolis) and "valley". It comprises the alluvial plain of the river Isère from Grenoble to the confluence of the Arc; or, more recently, the entire valley of the Isère from Tullins to Albertville. The stretch from Tullins to Grenoble is now the Bas-Grésivaudan (Lower Grésivaudan) and that between Grenoble and Albertville is the Haut-Grésivaudan (Upper Grésivaudan).

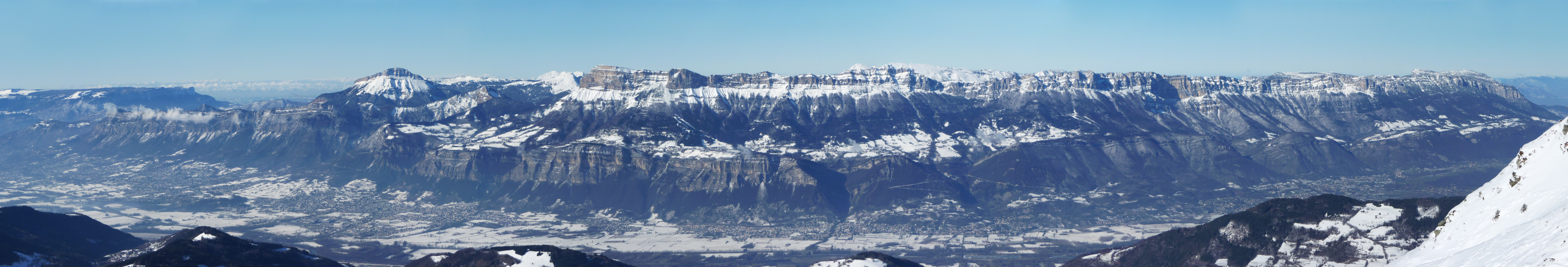
Valley of Grésivaudan seen from the 7 Laux ski resort

== Climate ==
Under the Köppen system, the Grésivaudan valley is on the boundary between the humid continental and the oceanic climates. Winters are cold and moderately snowy, while summers are hot and slightly drier.

Climate data for Crolles, Isère, France, Alt. : 239 m, (1982-2012)
Month	Jan	Feb	Mar	Apr	May	Jun	Jul	Aug	Sep	Oct	Nov	Dec	Year
Mean daily maximum °C (°F)	5.6 (42.1)	8.1 (46.6)	13.4 (56.1)	16.5 (61.7)	20.5 (68.9)	24.0 (75.2)	26.7 (80.1)	25.8 (78.4)	22.4 (72.3)	16.6 (61.9)	10.6 (51.1)	5.9 (42.6)	16.3 (61.4)
Daily mean °C (°F)	1.6 (34.9)	3.4 (38.1)	7.8 (46.0)	10.9 (51.6)	14.7 (58.5)	18.1 (64.6)	20.3 (68.5)	19.6 (67.3)	16.8 (62.2)	11.7 (53.1)	6.6 (43.9)	2.4 (36.3)	11.2 (52.2)
Mean daily minimum °C (°F)	−2.4 (27.7)	−1.2 (29.8)	2.2 (36.0)	5.4 (41.7)	9.0 (48.2)	12.3 (54.1)	14.0 (57.2)	13.5 (56.3)	11.3 (52.3)	6.9 (44.4)	2.7 (36.9)	−1.0 (30.2)	6.1 (42.9)
Average precipitation mm (inches)	59 (2.3)	66 (2.6)	72 (2.8)	66 (2.6)	78 (3.1)	75 (3.0)	53 (2.1)	72 (2.8)	78 (3.1)	78 (3.1)	85 (3.3)	67 (2.6)	849 (33.4)
Source: http://en.climate-data.org/
