= Barnsley Interchange =

Railway and bus station in South Yorkshire, England

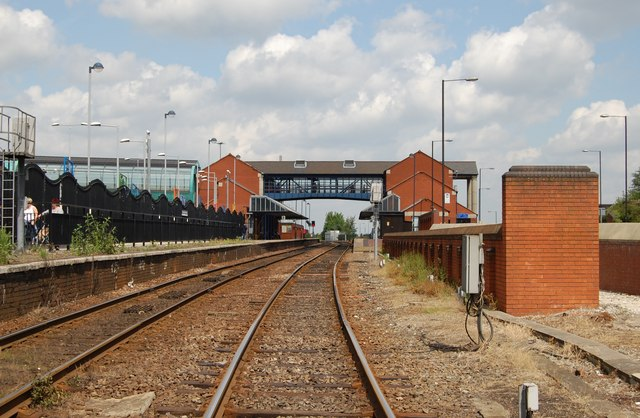

General information
- Location: Barnsley, Metropolitan Borough of Barnsley, England
- Coordinates: 53.554080°N 1.477590°W
- Grid reference: SE347065
- Manager: Northern Trains
- Transit authority: Travel South Yorkshire
- Platforms: 2

Other information
- Station code: BNY
- Fare zone: Barnsley
- Classification: DfT category C2

History
- Opened: 1850; 176 years ago
- Original company: Sheffield, Rotherham, Barnsley, Wakefield, Huddersfield & Goole Railway
- Pre-grouping: Lancashire and Yorkshire Railway
- Post-grouping: London, Midland and Scottish Railway

Key dates
- 1 January 1850: Opened as Barnsley
- 2 June 1924: Renamed Barnsley Low Town
- 1 August 1924: Renamed Barnsley Exchange
- 13 June 1960: Renamed Barnsley
- 20 May 2007: Renamed Barnsley Interchange

Passengers
- 2020/21: ▼0.314 million
- Interchange: ▼4,562
- 2021/22: ▲1.033 million
- Interchange: ▲19,202
- 2022/23: ▲1.213 million
- Interchange: ▲22,708
- 2023/24: ▲1.398 million
- Interchange: ▲26,961
- 2024/25: ▲1.520 million
- Interchange: ▲30,321
Location
Notes
- Passenger statistics from the Office of Rail and Road

Barnsley Interchange is a combined railway and bus station in the centre of Barnsley, in South Yorkshire, England. It was first opened in 1850 as Barnsley Exchange station and is 16 miles (26 km) north of Sheffield. It lies on both the Hallam and Penistone Lines, operated by Northern Trains. On 20 May 2007, the newly-named Barnsley Interchange was opened officially by the Secretary of State for Transport, Douglas Alexander MP.

== History ==
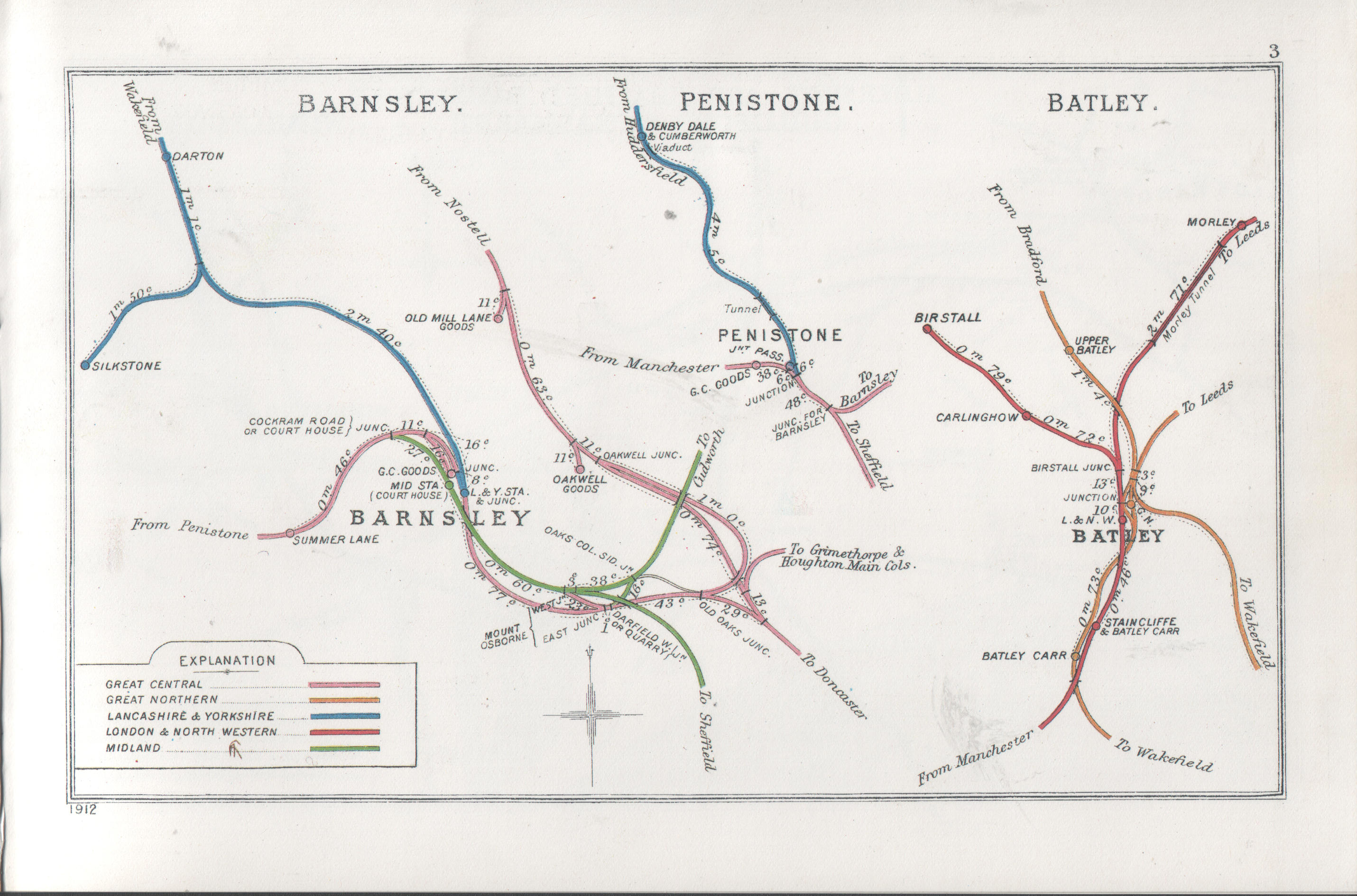
A 1912 Railway Clearing House junction diagram showing (left) railways in the vicinity of Barnsley; the present station is shown here as L.&Y. Sta. on the blue line

The Sheffield, Rotherham, Barnsley, Wakefield, Huddersfield & Goole Railway was formed in 1846 with the aim of providing access to South Yorkshire's coalfields. It was to link the Manchester and Leeds Railway (M&LR) near Horbury, with the Sheffield and Rotherham Railway near Brightside, by way of Barnsley. Whilst the railway was still at the planning stage, it was split in two at Barnsley: the northern portion being leased to the M&LR and the southern to the South Yorkshire, Doncaster & Goole Railway (SYD&G). The northern section opened first and Barnsley station was opened with the line on 1 January 1850. The route of the southern section was changed and is connected instead to the SYD&G line near Mexborough. This section opened on 1 July 1851 and Barnsley then became a through station, although the two sections of line were operated by different railways.

On 1 July 1854, the Manchester, Sheffield and Lincolnshire Railway (MS&LR) opened a line from Penistone to Barnsley.

Each of these railway companies went through various takeovers and amalgamations. By the early 20th century, Barnsley station was co-owned by the Lancashire and Yorkshire Railway (LYR, successor to the M&LR) and the Great Central Railway (GCR, successor to the MS&LR and SYD&G). At the 1923 grouping, the GCR became part of the London and North Eastern Railway (LNER), whilst the LYR formed part of the new London, Midland and Scottish Railway (LMS), as did the Midland Railway (MR). The LYR and MR each contributed one station in Barnsley to the LMS and, since the ex-MR station was already distinguished as Barnsley Court House, the LMS renamed the former LYR station to Barnsley Low Town on 2 June 1924. Just two months later, on 1 August 1924, it was again renamed, this time to Barnsley Exchange.

Barnsley Court House station closed on 19 April 1960, following the commissioning of a new chord line south of the town near Quarry Junction that linked the former SYR route down the Blackburn Valley with the ex-MR line from Sheffield Midland, allowing services on the latter route to serve the station (and continue northwards to Wakefield and Leeds). Subsequently, on 13 June 1960, Barnsley Exchange was renamed Barnsley.. At this time, a second platform (no. 2) was added.

The station was rebuilt and extended in 1992; then, in 2007, South Yorkshire Passenger Transport Executive integrated the railway station with the bus station, hence the name change to Interchange. The redesign won a Civic Building award.

In May 1999, Midland Mainline commenced a daily weekday service to London St Pancras. The service was withdrawn by East Midlands Trains on 5 September 2008.

== Facilities ==
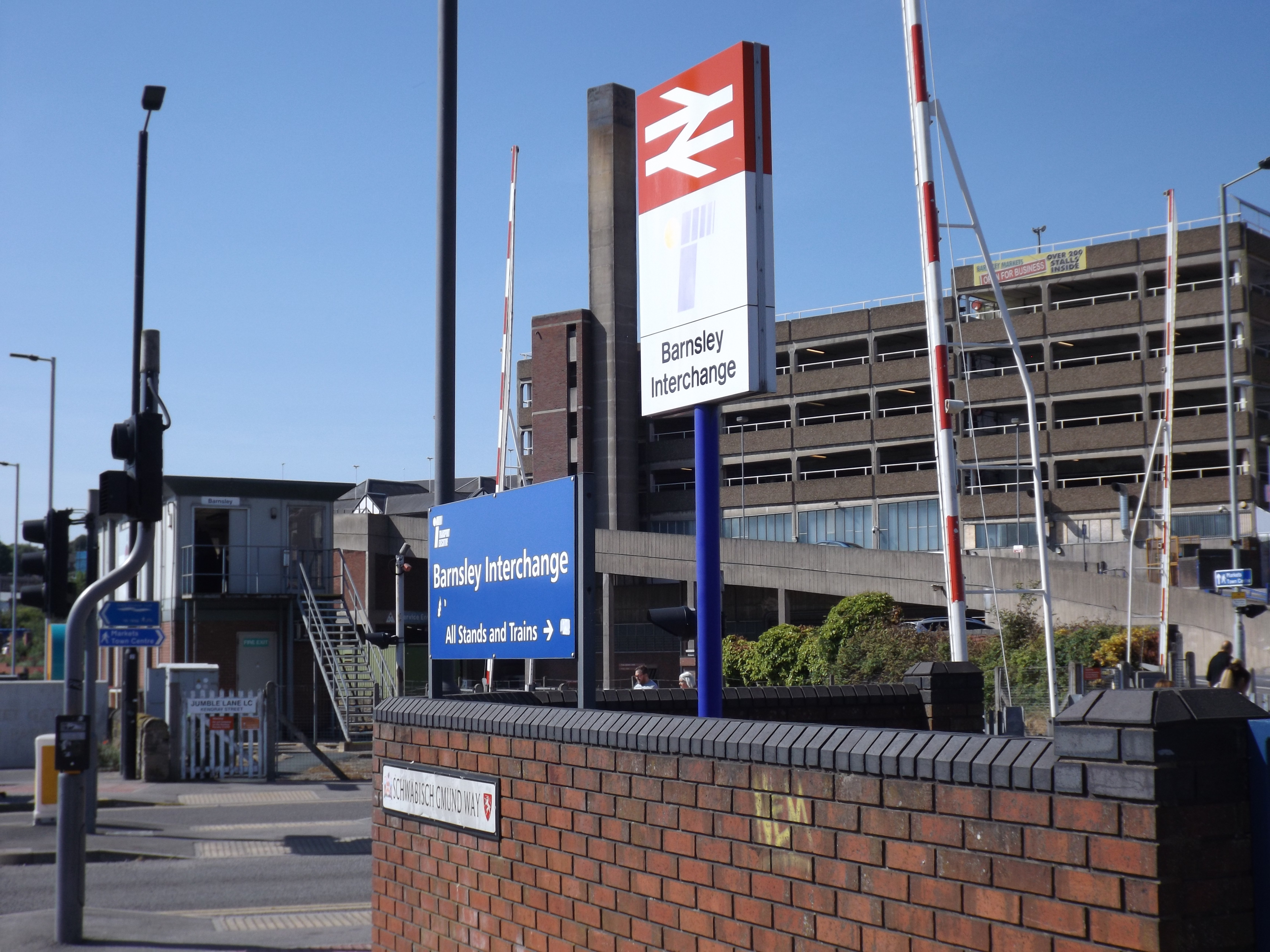
Station sign

The station is fully staffed throughout the day, with the booking office open from 06:00 to 19:30 Mondays to Saturdays, and from 08:45 to 19:00 on Sundays. There are several self-service ticket machines provided, located on the platform 2 footbridge and outside the ticket office.

In the main building on platform 1, there is a waiting room and toilets. A separate waiting room (with vending machines) is located on platform 2, with a fully accessible footbridge (equipped with lifts) linking them; there is step-free access from the entrance and bus station to all platforms. Train running information is provided by automated announcements, digital display screens and timetable posters.

== Services ==
=== Railway ===
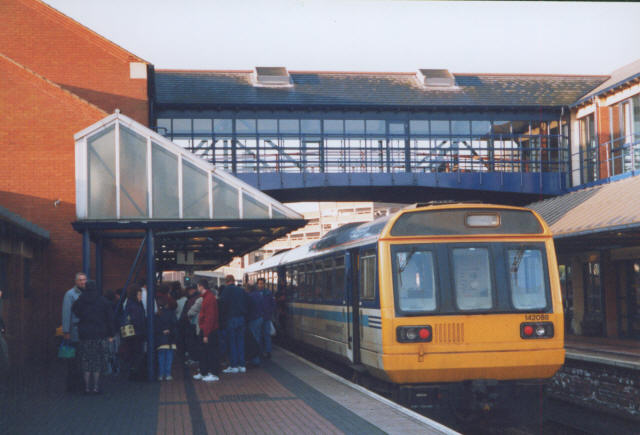
The station platforms in 1998

Northern Trains operates the following off-peak services, in trains per hour (tph):

Hallam line:

- 3 tph to Leeds; of which:
  - 2 tph are express services, calling only at Wakefield Kirkgate
  - 1 tph is an all-stations service, via Castleford
- 3 tph to Sheffield; of which:
  - 1 tph continues to Nottingham
  - 1 tph continues to Lincoln.

Penistone line:

- 1 tph to Huddersfield
- 1 tph to Sheffield.

Preceding station	National Rail	Following station
Wombwell	Northern Trains Hallam Line	Darton
Wombwell	Northern Trains Penistone Line	Dodworth
Meadowhall	Northern Trains Leeds-Nottingham	Wakefield Kirkgate
Meadowhall	Northern Trains Leeds-Lincoln	Wakefield Kirkgate
	Future Services	
Meadowhall	Northern Connect; Leeds - Lincoln	Wakefield Kirkgate

=== Buses ===
Barnsley Interchange
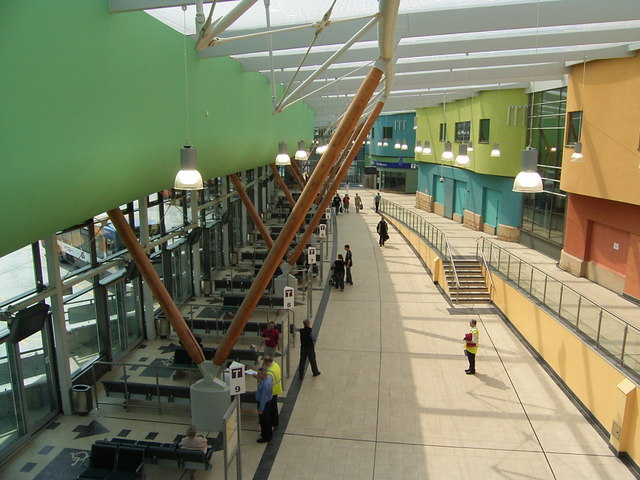

General information
- Location: Eldon Street North, Barnsley; Metropolitan Borough of Barnsley; United Kingdom
- Owner: South Yorkshire Passenger Transport Executive
- Operator: South Yorkshire Passenger Transport Executive
- Bus stands: 24
- Bus operators: Globe Coaches, National Express, Powell's Bus, Stagecoach Yorkshire, TM Travel and Waterson Coaches

Construction
- Parking: No
- Cycle facilities: Yes
- Accessible: Yes

History
- Opened: 20 May 2007
Location

The bus station features the latest in technology, such as the South Yorkshire Passenger Transport Executive scheme of Your Next Bus, tracking buses with GPS to check what time they are due to arrive and depart. Several shops occupy retail units within the interchange, including Lloyd's Pharmacy, GT News, Cowpuccino Espresso Bar, Cooplands and a Subway.

Work has since been completed on the link road, Schwäbisch Gmünd Way (formerly Interchange Way), which was renamed in honour of Barnsley's twin town in Germany. This initially enabled buses to enter or leave the Interchange quickly, without having to use the busy level crossing at Jumble Lane; the crossing closed in 2019.

As of April 2026, the stand allocation is:

Stand	Route	Destination
A1	2	Sheffield, Moor Market via Worsbrough, Birdwell, Hoyland, Chapeltown, Ecclesfield, Lane Top, the Northern General Hospital, Fir Vale and Sheffield Interchange (Stagecoach)
A1	X17	Matlock via Meadowhall, Sheffield Interchange, Woodseats, Whittington Moor, Chesterfield, Walton, Holymoorside, Stone Edge and Kelstedge (Stagecoach Gold)
A2	66	Elsecar via Birdwell, Hoyland Common, Hoyland and Jump (Stagecoach)
A3	7	Hoyland via Worsbrough Bridge, Blacker Hill and Platts Common (Stagecoach)
A3	67, 67a, 67b, 67c	Wombwell via Worsbrough Common, Worsbrough, Birdwell, Tankersley, Hoyland, Jump and Cortonwood (Stagecoach)
A3	94, 94a	Denby Dale via Gawber, Barnsley Hospital, Higham and Cawthorne (Globe & Stagecoach)
A4	23a	Deepcar via Gilroyd, Thurgoland, Wortley and Stocksbridge (Stagecoach)
A4	24, 24a	Ingbirchworth via Gilroyd, Thurgoland and Penistone (Stagecoach & TM Travel)
A4	96	Wakefield via Gawber, Barnsley Hospital, Kexbrough and West Bretton (Globe)
A5	20	Penistone via Silkstone, Hoylandswaine and Cubley (Stagecoach)
A5	21, 21a	Crow Edge via Gilroyd, Silkstone, Silkstone Common, Oxspring, Cubley, Penistone and Millhouse Green (Stagecoach)
A5	22	Gilroyd via Pogmoor and Dodworth (Stagecoach)
A6	93	Woolley Colliery via Gawber, Barnsley Hospital, Barugh Green, Darton and Mapplewell (Stagecoach)
A6	95, 95a	Kexbrough via Gawber, Barnsley Hospital, Wilthorpe, Barugh Green and Darton (Stagecoach)
A7	43, 44	Pogmoor via Worsbrough Common, Barnsley Hospital and Kingstone (Stagecoach)
A8	12	Athersley South via Honeywell and Smithies (Stagecoach)
A9	11	Athersley North via Smithies and New Lodge (Stagecoach)
A10	1	Staincross via Smithies, New Lodge and Mapplewell (Stagecoach)
A11	–	no services allocated
A12	–	no services allocated
A13	57	Royston via Monk Bretton and Carlton (Stagecoach)
A13	59, 59a	Wakefield via Monk Bretton, Carlton, Royston, Notton, Newmillerdam and Sandal & Agbrigg (Stagecoach)
A14	27, 27a, 27b	Wombwell via Shafton, Brierley, Grimethorpe and Darfield (Stagecoach)
A14	28, 28c	Pontefract via Cudworth, Shafton, Grimethorpe, Brierley and Hemsworth (Stagecoach)
A15	36	South Elmsall via Monk Bretton, Cudworth, Shafton, Brierley, Hemsworth and South Kirkby (Watersons)
A15	38	Grimethorpe via Cundy Cross, Lundwood, Cudworth and Shafton (Watersons)
A16	32	Cudworth via Hoyle Mill, Cundy Cross and Lundwood (Stagecoach)
A17	6	Worsbrough Dale via Kendray (Stagecoach)
A18	22X	Rotherham via Wombwell, Wath-upon-Dearne, Manvers, Rawmarsh and Parkgate (Stagecoach)
A18	222	Cortonwood via Stairfoot and Wombwell (Stagecoach)
A18	226	Thurnscoe via Stairfoot, Wombwell, Wath-upon-Dearne, Bolton-upon-Dearne and Goldthorpe (Stagecoach)
A19	X19	Doncaster via Darfield and Goldthorpe (Stagecoach)
A19	X20	Doncaster via Wombwell, Old Moor, Manvers, Mexborough, Conisbrough and Warmsworth (Powell's Bus)
A20	218, 218a	Rotherham via Darfield, Goldthorpe, Bolton-upon-Dearne, Manvers, Mexborough, Swinton, Kilnhurst and Rawmarsh (Stagecoach)
A20	219, 219a	Doncaster via Ardsley, Darfield, Great Houghton, Thurnscoe, Goldthorpe, Barnburgh, Harlington and Sprotbrough (Stagecoach)
A21	X10	Leeds via New Lodge, Mapplewell, Darton and Kexbrough (Stagecoach)
A22	–	no services allocated
A23	–	National Express intercity coach services and rail replacement bus services
A24	–	National Express intercity coach services and rail replacement bus services

== In popular culture ==
In 2013, the interchange was used as a filming location in Channel 4's cult drama series Utopia.
