= List of schools in Barnsley =

This is a list of schools in the Metropolitan Borough of Barnsley in the English county of South Yorkshire.

== State-funded schools ==
=== Primary schools ===
- All Saints Academy, Darfield
- Athersley North Primary School, Athersley
- Athersley South Primary School, Athersley
- Barugh Green Primary School, Barugh Green
- Birdwell Primary School, Birdwell
- Birkwood Primary School, Cudworth
- Brierley CE Primary School, Brierley
- Burton Road Primary School, Old Town
- Carlton Primary Academy, Carlton
- Carrfield Primary Academy, Bolton upon Dearne
- Cawthorne CE Primary School, Cawthorne
- Cherry Dale Primary School, Cudworth
- Churchfield Primary School, Cudworth
- Darton Primary School, Darton
- Dodworth St John the Baptist CE Primary Academy, Dodworth
- The Ellis CE Primary School, Hemingfield
- Elsecar Holy Trinity CE Primary Academy, Elsecar
- The Forest Academy, Kendray
- Gawber Primary School, Gawber
- Goldthorpe Primary Academy, Goldthorpe
- Gooseacre Primary Academy, Thurnscoe
- Greenfield Primary School, Hoyland
- Heather Garth Primary Academy, Bolton upon Dearne
- High View Primary Learning Centre, Wombwell
- Highgate Primary Academy, Goldthorpe
- The Hill Primary Academy, Thurnscoe
- Holy Rood RC Primary School, Shaw Lands
- Holy Trinity RC and CE School, Athersley
- Hoyland Common Primary School, Hoyland Common
- Hoyland Springwood Primary School, Hoyland
- Hoylandswaine Primary School, Hoylandswaine
- Hunningley Primary School, Kendray
- Joseph Locke Primary School, Shaw Lands
- Jump Primary School, Jump
- Keresforth Primary School, Dodworth
- Kexborough Primary School, Darton
- Kings Oak Primary Learning Centre, Wombwell
- Lacewood Primary School, Bolton upon Dearne
- Ladywood Primary School, Grimethorpe
- Laithes Primary School, Smithies
- Mapplewell Primary School, Mapplewell
- Meadstead Primary Academy, Royston
- Milefield Primary School, Grimethorpe
- The Mill Academy, Worsbrough
- Millhouse Primary School, Millhouse Green
- Oakhill Primary Academy, Ardsley
- Oakwell Rise Primary Academy, Measborough Dike
- Outwood Primary Academy Darfield, Darfield
- Outwood Primary Academy Littleworth Grange, Lundwood
- Oxspring Primary School, Oxspring
- Parkside Primary Academy, Royston
- Penistone St John's Primary School, Penistone
- Queens Road Academy, Hoyle Mill
- Royston St John Baptist CE Primary School, Royston
- Sacred Heart RC Primary School, Goldthorpe
- St Helen's RC Primary School, Hoyland
- St Helen's Primary Academy, Monk Bretton
- St Mary's CE Primary School, Pogmoor
- St Michael and All Angels RC Primary School, Wombwell
- Sandhill Primary School, Great Houghton
- Shafton Primary Academy, Shafton
- Shawlands Primary School, Shaw Lands
- Silkstone Common Junior and Infant School, Silkstone Common
- Silkstone Primary School, Silkstone
- Springvale Primary School, Penistone
- Summer Lane Primary School, Pogmoor
- Summerfields Primary Academy, Royston
- Tankersley St Peter's CE Primary School, Tankersley
- Thurgoland CE Primary School, Thurgoland
- Thurlstone Primary School, Thurlstone
- Upperwood Academy, Darfield
- Ward Green Primary School, Worsbrough
- Wellgate Primary School, Mapplewell
- West Meadows Primary School, Hoyland
- Wilthorpe Primary School, Wilthorpe
- Wombwell Park Street Primary School, Wombwell
- Worsbrough Bank End Primary School, Worsbrough
- Worsbrough Common Primary School, Worsbrough

=== Secondary schools ===
- Astrea Academy Dearne, Goldthorpe
- Barnsley Academy, Kendray
- Darton Academy, Darton
- Holy Trinity Catholic and Church of England School, Athersley
- Horizon Community College, Shaw Lands
- Kirk Balk Academy, Hoyland
- Netherwood Academy, Wombwell
- Outwood Academy Carlton, Carlton
- Outwood Academy Shafton, Shafton
- Penistone Grammar School, Penistone
- Trinity Academy St Edwards, Barnsley Town Centre

=== Special and alternative schools ===
- Greenacre School, Kingstone
- Springwell Alternative Academy, Athersley
- Springwell Special Academy, Athersley

=== Further education ===
- Barnsley College
- Northern College for Residential and Community Adult Education

== Independent schools ==
=== Special and alternative schools ===
- Dove School, Staincross
- Park House School, Tankersley
- The Robert Ogden School, Thurnscoe
- Waterton Newstead Academy, Athersley
