= Listed buildings in Great Houghton, South Yorkshire =

Great Houghton is a civil parish in the metropolitan borough of Barnsley, South Yorkshire, England. The parish contains two listed buildings that are recorded in the National Heritage List for England. Of these, one is listed at Grade II*, the middle of the three grades, and the other is at Grade II, the lowest grade. The listed buildings consist of a church and a large house.

== Key ==
| Grade | Criteria |
|---|---|
| II* | Particularly important buildings of more than special interest |
| II | Buildings of national importance and special interest |

== Buildings ==
| Name and location | Photograph | Date | Notes | Grade |
|---|---|---|---|---|
| St Michael and All Angels Church and wall 53.55369°N 1.35195°W | | c. 1650 | Originally a private chapel, later a parish church, it is in sandstone with a tile roof. The church consists of a nave and a chancel in one unit, and a west porch. It has a plinth, quoins, and a continuous hood mould, above which is a moulded course, and an embattled parapet with round-headed merlons. On the west gable is a bellcote with a shaped head. The windows have chamfered surrounds, and contain three round-headed lights with transoms. To the west of the churchyard is a perimeter wall with triangular coping. | II* |
| Burntwood Hall; 53.57809°N 1.35416°W | | Late 18th or early 19th century | A large house that was later extended and used for other purposes. It is in sandstone on a plinth, with a wooden eaves cornice, and a hipped stone slate roof with stone copings. There are two storeys and an irregular plan, with a symmetrical front of seven bays, and a later wing on the right. In the centre of the front is a porch with Doric columns, imposts, a plain frieze, and a pediment. The outer bays contain two-storey canted bay windows containing sashes. The right return has four bays and contains similar bay windows, and in the wing is a similar bay window surmounted by a balustrade, and a loggia with four Doric columns and a modillion cornice. | II |
