= Darton railway station =

Railway station in South Yorkshire, England

Darton
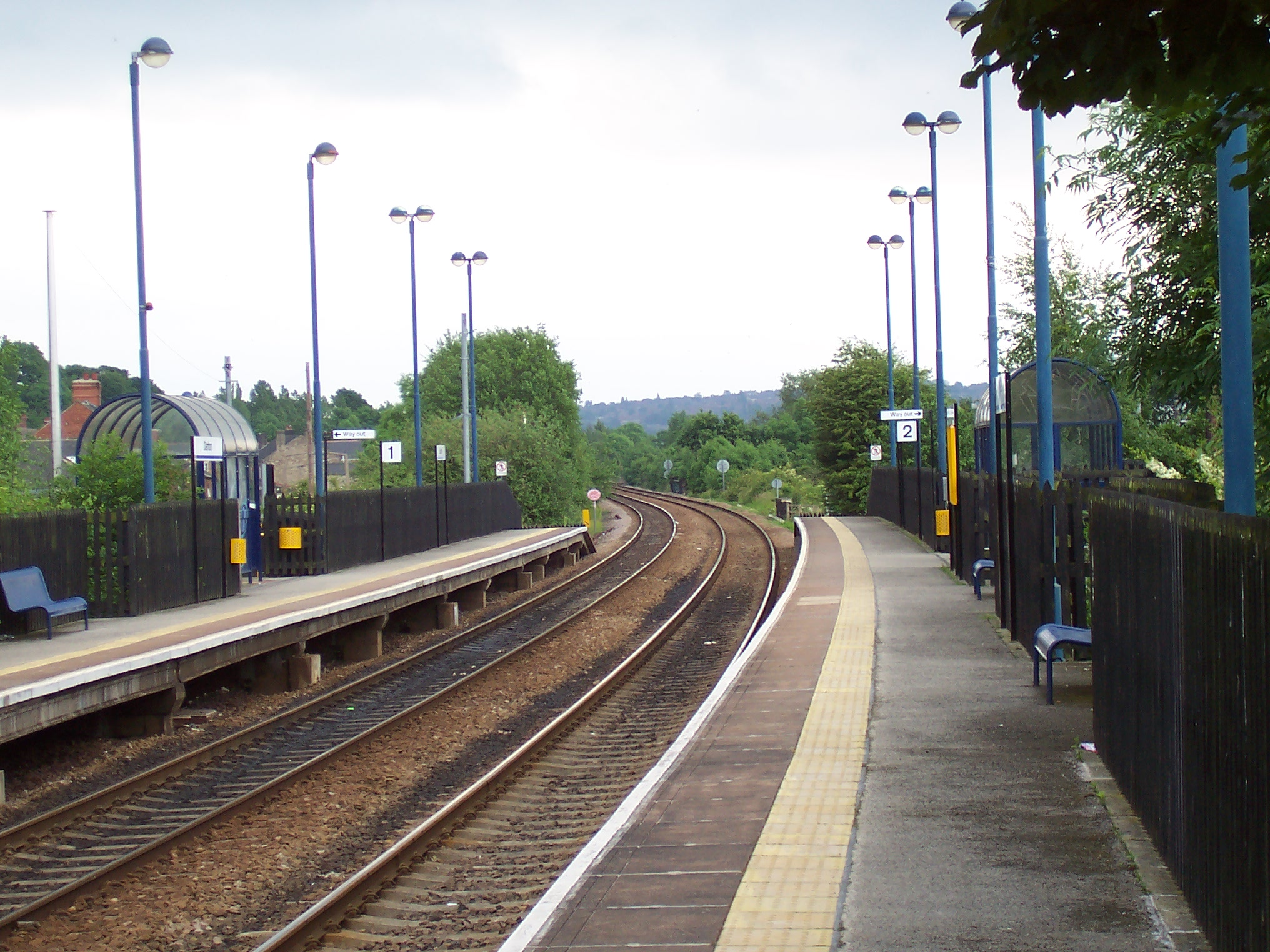
- View of the station taken from platform 2

General information
- Location: Darton, Barnsley; England
- Coordinates: 53.5880°N 1.5309°W
- Grid reference: SE311102
- Manager: Northern Trains
- Transit authority: South Yorkshire
- Platforms: 2

Other information
- Station code: DRT
- Fare zone: Barnsley (SYPTE); 5 (WYPTE)
- Classification: DfT category F1

History
- Original company: Manchester and Leeds Railway
- Pre-grouping: Lancashire and Yorkshire Railway
- Post-grouping: London, Midland and Scottish Railway

Key dates
- 1 January 1850: Station opened

Passengers
- 2020/21: ▼50,352
- 2021/22: ▲0.104 million
- 2022/23: ▼0.102 million
- 2023/24: ▲0.110 million
- 2024/25: ▲0.121 million
Location
Notes
- Passenger statistics from the Office of Rail and Road

Darton railway station is a railway station in a large village of Darton, in the Metropolitan Borough of Barnsley, South Yorkshire, England. Train services are provided by Northern Trains.

The station was opened by the Manchester and Leeds Railway on 1 January 1850.

The railway station is in South Yorkshire but West Yorkshire Metro tickets are also valid to and from this station. The reason for this is that the West-South Yorkshire boundary historically ran between the village and its main source of employment, Woolley Colliery.

The car park at the station was recently reported by the local police force as having the highest incidence of vehicle break-ins in the Barnsley area, but the installation of CCTV is hoped to address this problem.

== Facilities ==
The station is unstaffed and no longer has any permanent buildings aside from standard waiting shelters on each side (the old buildings were demolished after the station lost its staffing in 1970). Timetable posters and digital display screens provide train running information and there is step-free access to both platforms.

== Services ==
There is an hourly service to Leeds via Wakefield Kirkgate and Castleford northbound and to Sheffield via Barnsley southbound (though the last northbound train each day terminates at Wakefield Kirkgate). The service is two-hourly in each direction on Sundays.

Preceding station	National Rail	Following station
Barnsley	Northern Trains Hallam Line	Wakefield Kirkgate
