= Wombwell railway station =

Railway station in South Yorkshire, England

Wombwell
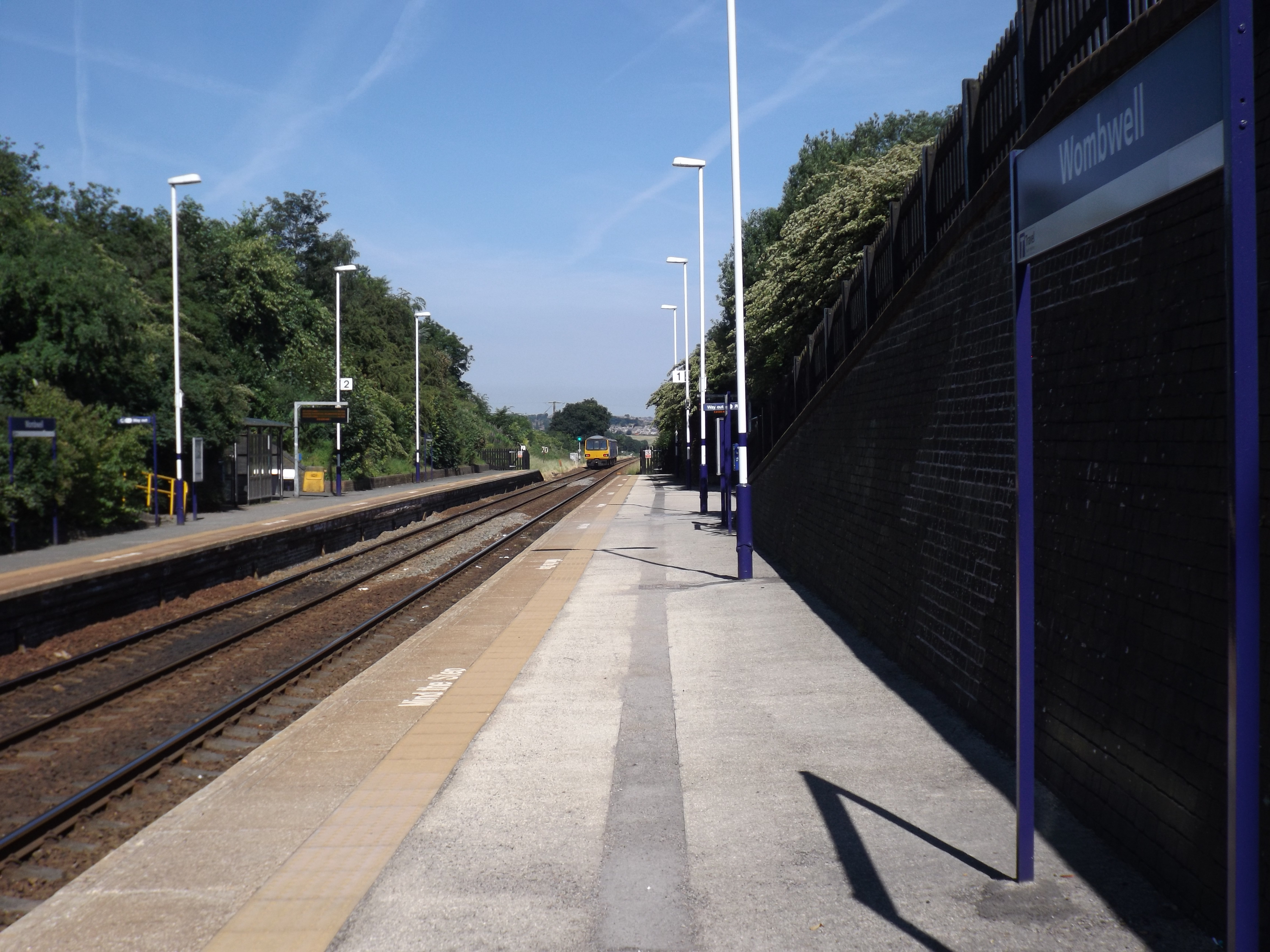

General information
- Location: Wombwell, Barnsley; England
- Coordinates: 53.5175°N 1.4164°W
- Grid reference: SE387024
- Manager: Northern Trains
- Transit authority: Travel South Yorkshire
- Platforms: 2

Other information
- Station code: WOM
- Fare zone: Barnsley
- Classification: DfT category F1

History
- Opened: 1 July 1897; 129 years ago
- Original company: Midland Railway
- Pre-grouping: Midland Railway
- Post-grouping: London, Midland and Scottish Railway

Key dates
- 1 July 1897: Opened as Wombwell
- 25 September 1950: Renamed Wombwell West
- 20 February 1969: Renamed Wombwell

Passengers
- 2020/21: ▼43,634
- 2021/22: ▲0.160 million
- 2022/23: ▲0.171 million
- 2023/24: ▲0.199 million
- 2024/25: ▲0.224 million
Location
Notes
- Passenger statistics from the Office of Rail and Road

Wombwell railway station is a railway station serving the town of Wombwell in South Yorkshire, England. The station is 12 miles (19 km) north of Sheffield on the Hallam and Penistone Lines. The station was opened by the Midland Railway on 1 July 1897, and between 25 September 1950 and 20 February 1969 was known as Wombwell West to distinguish it from Wombwell's other railway station, Wombwell Central, which closed in 1959.

CCTV was recently installed for the purposes of crime prevention. Other recent improvements to the station include new signage, lighting, and, for the first time, installation of passenger information display screens to provide real-time service information.

The station car park was extended in 2009 to give a total of 74 spaces for rail users.

== Facilities ==
The only permanent buildings remaining at the station (which is unstaffed) are standard waiting shelters on each platform. Tickets can be bought in advance or at the self-service ticket machine. The aforementioned CIS displays provide train running information, along with timetable poster boards. There is step-free access to both platforms via ramps from the road above.

== Services ==
Services currently run twice per hour Monday to Saturdays to Sheffield (hourly Sundays) and hourly to Huddersfield on the Penistone Line and Leeds via Wakefield Kirkgate and Castleford on the Hallam Line respectively (two-hourly Sundays). One early morning northbound departure terminates at Barnsley and the last of the day at Wakefield Kirkgate.

== Notes ==
Preceding station	National Rail	Following station
Elsecar	Northern Trains Hallam Line	Barnsley
Elsecar	Northern Trains Penistone Line	Barnsley
