= Higham, South Yorkshire =

Village in South Yorkshire, England

Coordinates: 53.5583°N 1.5294°W

Higham
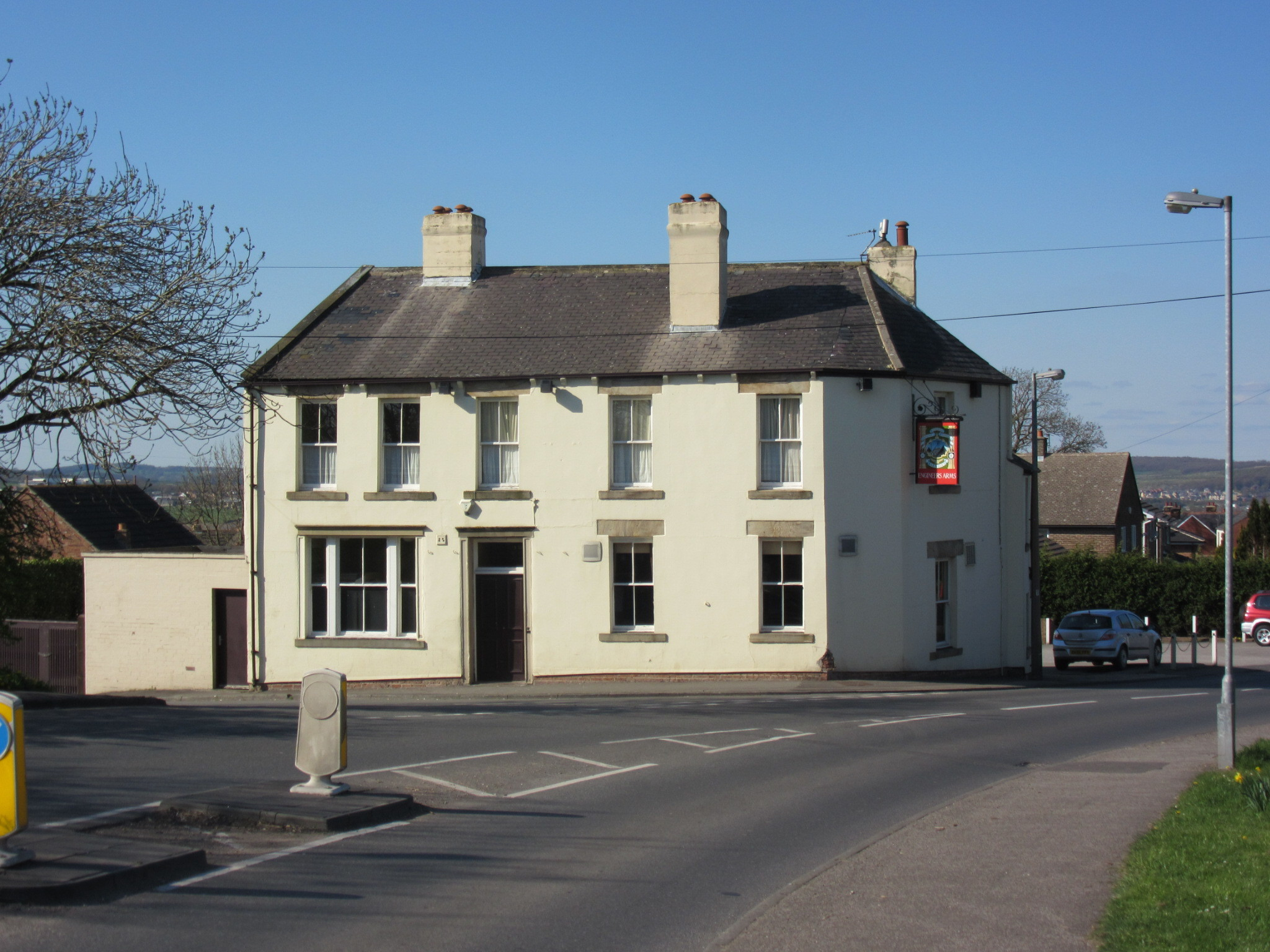
- The Engineers Arms in Higham, Barnsley

- Location within South Yorkshire
- OS grid reference: SE311071
- Metropolitan borough: Barnsley
- Metropolitan county: South Yorkshire
- Region: Yorkshire and the Humber
- Country: England
- Sovereign state: United Kingdom
- Post town: BARNSLEY
- Postcode district: S75
- Dialling code: 01226
- Police: South Yorkshire
- Fire: South Yorkshire
- Ambulance: Yorkshire
- UK Parliament: Penistone and Stocksbridge

Higham /ˈhɪkəm/ is a village in the metropolitan borough of Barnsley in South Yorkshire, England. The village falls within the Dodworth ward of the Barnsley MBC.

== The village ==
The village of Higham is also known locally as 'Hickam', as the saying goes: 'Higham where they fry'em, Hickam where they stick'em.' Most of the population lived on 3 main rows of houses: Old Row, New Row and Concrete Row, although only the New Row now survives. Most of those houses were built to house the Coal Miners who used to work at the nearby collieries. There used to be 3 pubs in the village: The Hermit Inn, The Miners Inn and The Engineers Arms. The Miners Inn has been demolished, The Hermit Inn is now a curry shop leaving only The Engineers Arms. During the last few decades the village has changed greatly with a lot of new, modern houses that greatly contrast with the older houses of the New Row. People have moved into the village seeking peace and quiet but with easy access to the M1 Motorway.

== Location ==
Higham is surrounded by the villages of Gawber, Barugh Green, Dodworth, Redbrook and Pogmoor. Other places of note nearby are the villages of Silkstone, Cawthorne and Darton. Nearby places include Captain and Hugset Woods, and Higham Reservoir. Higham used to have a small drift mine known as the Higham Pumping Station. The drift was used for coal to come from Redbrook Colliery and then up the belt track to Dodworth colliery to the screens and washers. There was an even older shaft that could still be seen in the 1970s.

== Place of worship ==
The village has a Methodist Chapel that also now houses the local Post Office. The chapel is open on Sundays for morning worship and evensong.

== Sports ==
Higham currently has a cricket club that plays in the South Yorkshire Senior Cricket League and at one time had a football team that used to play in the Sunday league. Here coal miners played the game of Nipsy (not Knur and Spell) on the field at the back of the Miners Inn (Pigoyle).

== Notable persons ==
Higham has had a number of sporting personalities: Keith Burkinshaw was famous in the sport of football and Ron Darlow was Nipsy world champion before his death.

== Popular walks ==
Popular walking routes from the village are: Hermit Lane, from Higham to Gawber passing the church of "St Thomas". An alternate route takes you over the field to Pogmoor. Pogwell lane, starting at the Engineers Inn and leading down into the Hugset wood or taking the route up towards Silkstone golf links. Higham Lane, leading from Higham Common towards Dodworth or, after crossing the motorway bridge, bearing right, down into the Captain Wood and follow the old belt track. Royd Lane, passing down the side of the cricket field, this lane will take you down towards Cawthorne Basin and over to the Furnace pit.
