= Arthur Kay =

Arthur Kay or Kaye may refer to:

- Arthur Kay (rugby league), New Zealand rugby player
- Arthur Kaye (1933–2003), English footballer
- Sir Arthur Kaye, 3rd Baronet (c. 1670–1726), English politician
- Arthur Kay (musician) (1882–1969), American composer for films

== See also ==
- Arthur Kaye Legge (1766–1835), British Royal Navy officer
- Kay Arthur (1933-2025), Bible teacher and author
