= New Lodge =

New Lodge may refer to:

- New Lodge, Winkfield near Windsor, Berkshire, England
- New Lodge, South Yorkshire, England
- New Lodge, Belfast, an area of North Belfast, Northern Ireland
- New Lodge, Billericay, association football ground in Billericay, Essex, home of Billericay Town F.C.
