= Millhouses, Barnsley =

Area of Barnsley, South Yorkshire, England

Coordinates: 53.53453°N 1.35874°W

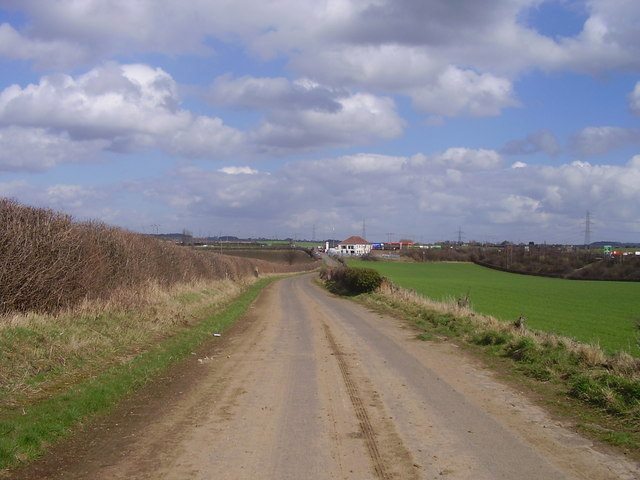
Cathill Road

Millhouses is a district of Barnsley in the English county of South Yorkshire.

Millhouses adjoins the town of Darfield near the A635 road to the east of Barnsley itself. The district falls within the Darfield Ward of the MBC.
