= Brierley =

Village in South Yorkshire, England

Coordinates: 53.5947°N 1.38201°W

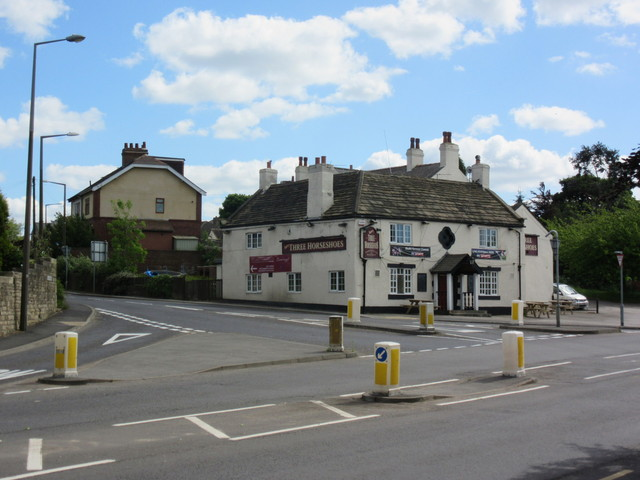
- The Three Horseshoes Pub in Brierley

- Location within South Yorkshire
- Population: 7,267 (2011 census)
- OS grid reference: SE410110
  - London: 150 mi (240 km) SSE
- Metropolitan borough: Barnsley
- Metropolitan county: South Yorkshire
- Region: Yorkshire and the Humber
- Country: England
- Sovereign state: United Kingdom
- Post town: Barnsley
- Postcode district: S72
- Dialling code: 01226
- Police: South Yorkshire
- Fire: South Yorkshire
- Ambulance: Yorkshire
- UK Parliament: Barnsley North

Brierley (/ˈbraɪ.ərli/) is a village in the Metropolitan Borough of Barnsley in South Yorkshire, England. The settlement is tightly clustered and green buffered on a modest escarpment close to the border with West Yorkshire, it is almost wholly in population south of the A628 road, and is less than 2 miles (3 km) to the south west of Hemsworth.

Its late nineteenth century founded civil parish contained the pit village of Grimethorpe, and at the 2001 census had a population of 5,973, increasing to 7,267 in the 2011 Census. Brierley is at its core approximately 330 feet (100 m) above sea level on gently undulating slopes.

== History ==
Brierley was an early Saxon settlement. The fort at Brierley Gap, mistakenly called Saxon, is from a much earlier period, probably the Iron Age. The village grew first around the hilltop on the Barnsley to Pontefract road where a small hollow and the sites of several wells provided a good building area.

Along Ket Hill Lane, coal seams come to the surface and form part of the soil so coal must have been known to these early farmers. Sandstone and coal in alternate layers are the underlying rocks of the area. In the Domesday Book, Brierley is referred to as 'Brerelia' in the wapentake of Staincross. The actual Domesday Book spelling is 'Breselia' but all ensuing documents use 'Brerelia' as the correct form.

Later, this name became 'Brereley', then Brearley from which we get one of our modern pronunciations. It was first spelt as 'Brierley' in some documents relating to the leasing of Brierley Manor by descendants of the Harryngton family, from Queen Elizabeth I in 1572.

This spelling of the name was not commonly used until it appeared in a Manor Court Roll for 1665. The early field boundaries can be recognised on the Ordnance Survey Map by the irregular way in which they ring the village and by the winding outline of their hedges due to the ploughing methods of the time.

On a well-hidden site between Brierley and Grimethorpe, stood the fortified Manor of Hall Steads (the name means 'hall site'), which belonged to the early Brereley estate. Its manor house was surrounded by a high, stone wall and a moat in a dwindled demesne in latter years of 5 acres (2.0 ha).

The building was mainly of local sandstone and many of the stones remain in the soil among which fragments of 14th and 15th century pottery have been found. St Paul's Church in Brierley was built in 1869 as a daughter church to the Parish of St Peter, Felkirk, it was deemed insufficient for the expanding population of the south of the area which formed Grimethorpe which equally became an ecclesiastical parish albeit later, in 1901, and the first vicar, set about raising funds to build its respective church.

Major donations were received from Mr F.J. Savile-Foljambe who donated the lands for the church and the vicarage and the Carlton Main Colliery, and the church was completed in 1904. St. Paul's Church in Brierley was built in 1869 for George Savile Foljambe, Lord of the Manor of Brierley, to the designs of John Wade in the Gothic Revival style.

Foljambe provided half the cost of the church, and the rest was donated by other local principal people, the land for the church and former Brierley church school was given by Rev John Hoyland, vicar of Felkirk. The first curate was Rev Godfrey Pigott Cordeux.

== Civil parish ==
Brierley was formerly a township in the parish of Felkirk, from 1866 Brierley was a civil parish in its own right, on 1 April 2016 the parish was abolished.

== Notable people ==
- Winifred Foley (1914–2009), writer who wrote about her childhood in the Forest of Dean, was born in Brierley.

== See also ==
- Listed buildings in Brierley and Grimethorpe
