= Arthur Kaye =

English footballer

Personal information
- Full name: Arthur Kaye
- Date of birth: 9 May 1933
- Place of birth: Higham, Barnsley, England
- Date of death: 12 October 2003 (aged 70)
- Place of death: Higham, Barnsley, England
- Position: Winger

Youth career
- Barnsley

Senior career*
Years	Team	Apps	(Gls)
1950–1959	Barnsley	265	(54)
1959–1960	Blackpool	48	(9)
1960–1965	Middlesbrough	164	(38)
1965–1967	Colchester United	49	(2)
- * Club domestic league appearances and goals

Arthur Kaye (9 May 1933 – 12 October 2003) was an English footballer who played in The Football League as a winger.

== Career ==
Born in Higham, Barnsley, in the West Riding of Yorkshire, he played for local club Barnsley, followed by Blackpool, Middlesbrough and Colchester United before retiring. Kaye also played for the England under-23 team. He died at his home in Higham, near Barnsley, following a short illness on 12 October 2003.

== Honours ==
=== Club ===
Barnsley

- Football League Third Division North Winner (1): 1954–55
- Football League Third Division North Runner-up (1): 1953–54
