= Wilthorpe =

Area of Barnsley in South Yorkshire, England

Coordinates: 53.559°N 1.501°W

Wilthorpe is an area of Barnsley in South Yorkshire, England.

Bisected by the A635 Huddersfield Road, Wilthorpe has several small shops and an infant school, as well as an ATS garage and a dentist.

Wilthorpe sits in the S75 area of Barnsley, along with the neighbouring districts of Pogmoor, Gawber, and Mapplewell. The village is popular among young professionals who commute to the cities of Leeds, Sheffield and Manchester.

== Amenities ==
The local pub, The Wilthorpe Hotel, closed in early 2012 and re-opened later that year as a Tesco Express.

The main attraction in Wilthorpe is the park, with stunning rose gardens, a reclaimed wildlife area, and a playground. Tinkers Pond is situated at the bottom of Woodstock Road. This fishing spot was a former reservoir according to the 1850 Ordnance Survey Map of Barnsley. The lower pond is also used for fishing and was formerly the primary water source for the Greenfoot Bleaching Works. This was originally built by Joseph Beckett to bleach locally woven linen, some time before the Barnsley Canal opened here in 1802. Today there still exists evidence of Victorian-era drainage from the old reservoir to the lower pond.

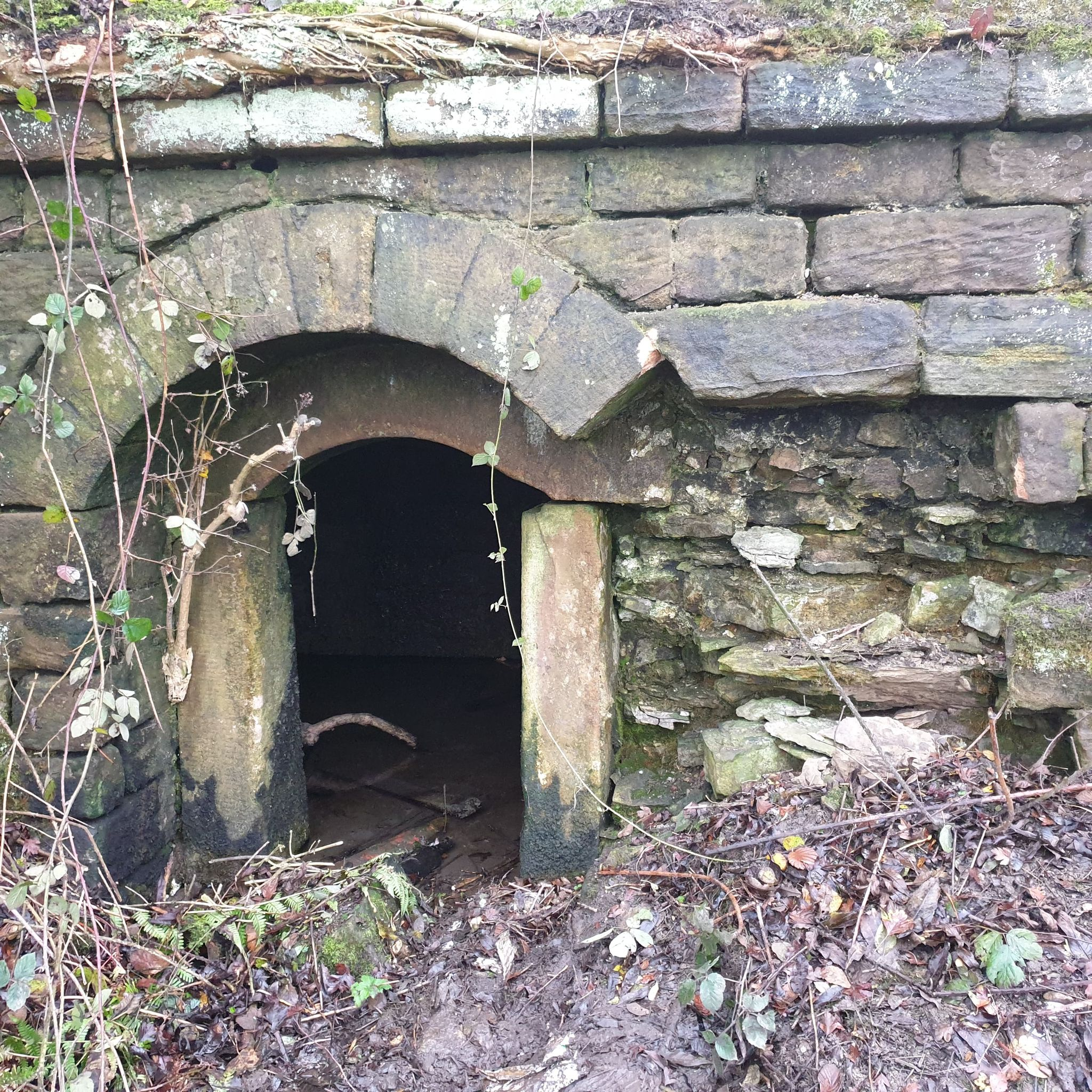
Greenfoot Bleaching Works drainage outlet (lower pond)

The Emmanuel Church, which was built in the late 1990s, serves the area. It also functions as a village hall with several events and clubs held there every week.

== Barnsley Business Innovation Centre ==
Wilthorpe is home to the Barnsley Business and Innovation Centre (BBIC). This was established in 1987 as a private company (limited by guarantee), with a mission to assist in the economic regeneration of the Barnsley Borough.

== See also ==
- Listed buildings in Darton
