= Woolley Colliery =

Coal mine in South Yorkshire, England

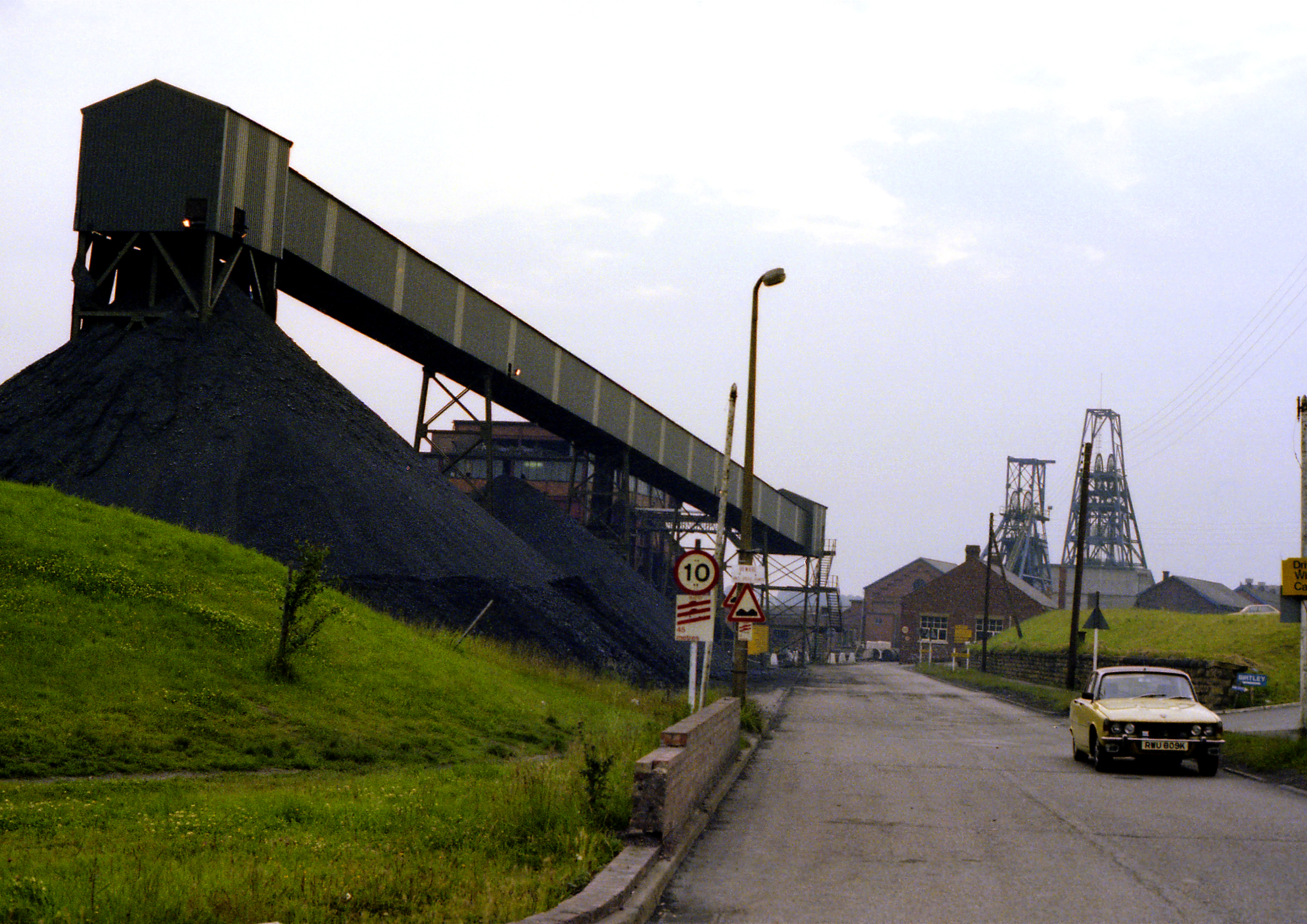
- Woolley Colliery, pictured in 1979

- Location in West Yorkshire
- Location: Darton,, England; 53°35′42″N 1°31′57″W
- Products: Coal
- Opened: 1869
- Closed: 1987
- Company: National Coal Board
- Acquired: 1994

Woolley Colliery was a coal mine sunk near Darton in the West Riding of Yorkshire. Coal mines in the area were worked as early as 1850, and in the 1860s two rows of terrace cottages were built to accommodate miners. The pit village, also named Woolley Colliery, is now in the Darton East ward of Barnsley Borough Council in South Yorkshire. The adjacent colliery site was reclaimed and is now occupied by a residential housing development named Woolley Grange which is in the City of Wakefield in West Yorkshire.

== Colliery ==
Several coal seams outcrop on Woolley Edge where coal had probably been mined for many years, but only on a small scale until railway transport began. The colliery began when two tunnels or drifts were dug into the Barnsley bed seam in the hillside. Later vertical shafts were sunk to reach the deeper seams. Woolley Colliery was established in 1869. It had three shafts, three seams (named Fenton, Lidgett and Thorncliffe), and five coal faces.

Woolley Colliery was nationalised in 1947 and most of its coal went to the production of electricity and coke. In the 1960s there were three shafts in the pit yard and a fourth, for ventilation, about a mile to the east. The pit grew to become one of the largest in Yorkshire. In 1980 it employed 1514 men underground and 428 on the surface. At that time around 17,000 tons of high-quality coal were produced each week. The pit was closed in 1987 and the buildings were demolished in 1993.

=== Miner's strike 1984–1985 ===
Arthur Scargill who became the leader of the NUM, started work at the colliery in 1953, when he was 15. The pit was among the most conservative in Yorkshire, and Scargill was often in dispute with the branch leadership. He organised a strike in 1960 over the day on which union meetings were held, as he argued that these were deliberately being held at times when the sections of the workforce that were inclined to militancy were unable to attend.

During the UK miners' strike of 1984–1985 roughly 70 per cent of the workforce at the colliery went on strike for a year, but the NUM branch leadership remained conservative about the use of flying pickets and union funds to help strikers. There were arguments with the lodge at North Gawber Colliery on contributions to a kitchen, as it was claimed that Woolley, which was a much larger pit, was making a minimal contribution to feeding strikers. After the strike the men from North Gawber were transferred to Woolley.

== Pit village ==
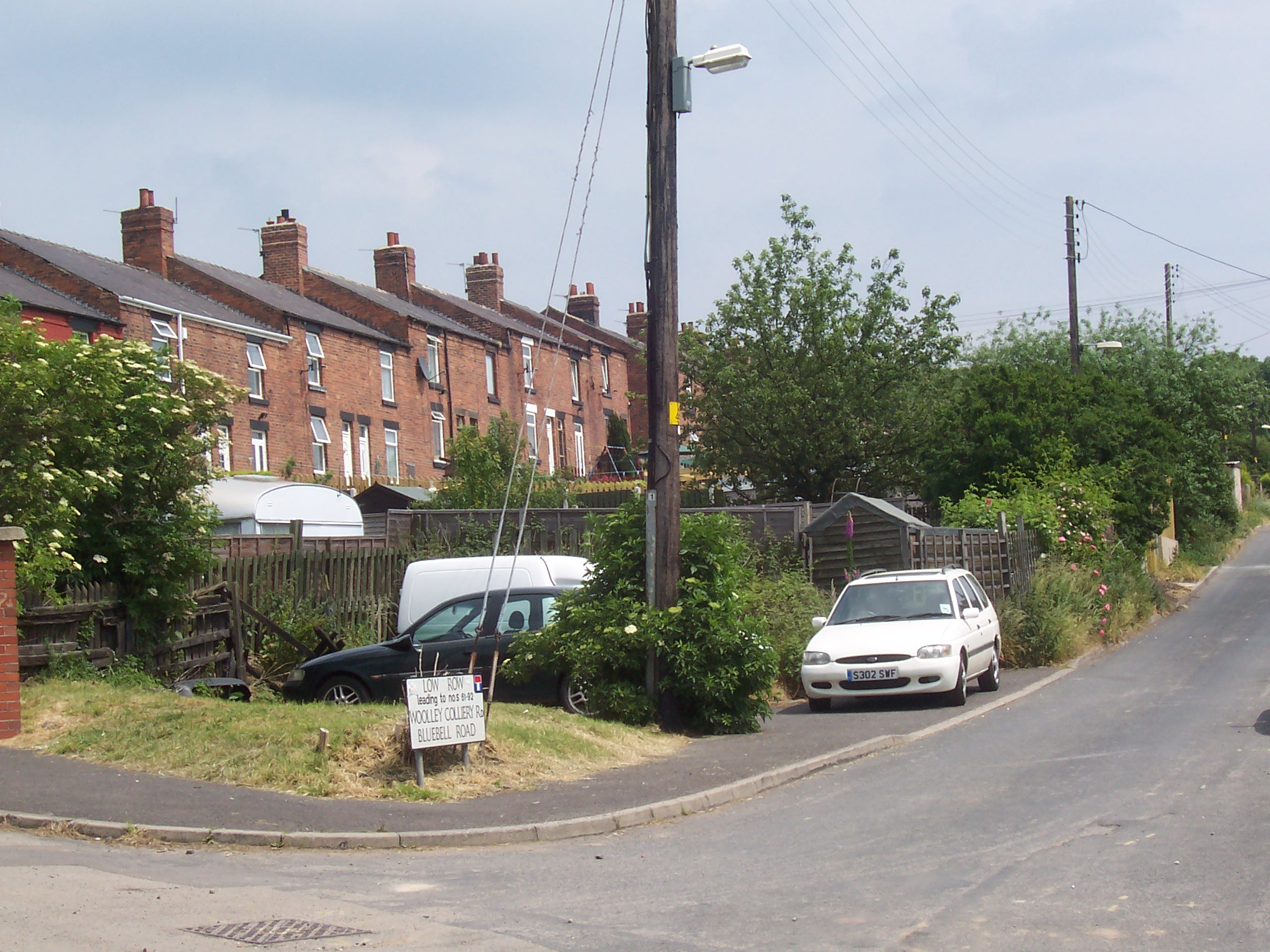
Woolley Colliery Village

Two long terraces of stone houses were built to the south of the colliery in the 1860s. This was the start of the colliery village which eventually had a village shop and the Miners Institute. Some of the terraced housing was demolished before the colliery closed. Houses in the colliery village are in the Metropolitan Borough of Barnsley in South Yorkshire. The area was in the historic parish of Darton, in the ancient Staincross Wapentake in the West Riding of Yorkshire. The village was known locally as Mucky Woolley, a reminder of its coalmining heritage and distinguished it from the village of Woolley two miles away.

== Woolley Grange ==
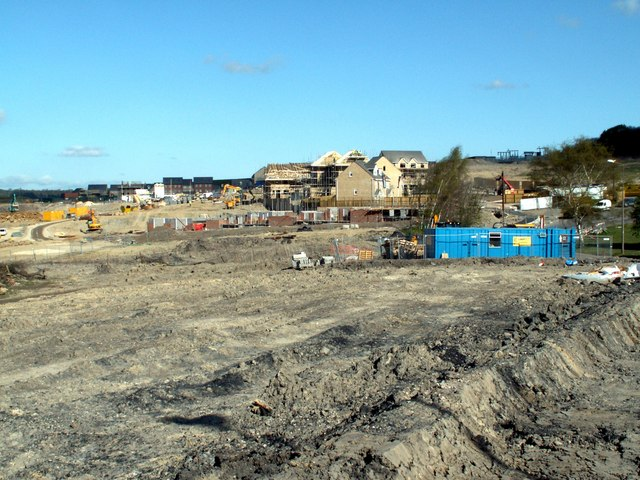
Construction of the new housing estate at the site of the former colliery

After the colliery site was cleared and a housing development called Woolley Grange was built. It is adjacent to Woolley Colliery village. All local schools and amenities are in nearby Darton and Staincross. The nearest bus stop is in Woolley Colliery village.

In 2023 further housing development plans on the site of the former colliery were opposed by residents and ecologists on the grounds that the scheme would erode local identity and have an adverse effect on local wildlife. The proposed construction site covered a natural habitat housing a colony of small blue butterflies, with the development plans leaving only the SUDS undeveloped. Plans to integrate the Woolley Grange into the Metropolitan Borough of Barnsley are currently underway by SYMCA.
