= Little Houghton, South Yorkshire =

Hamlet in South Yorkshire, England

Coordinates: 53°33′N 1°22′W

Little Houghton
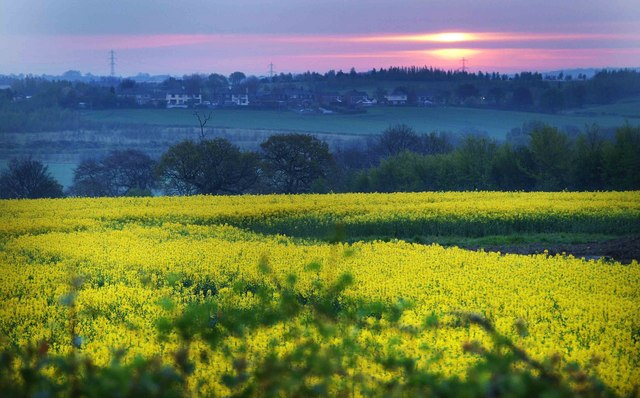
- Dearne Valley Sunrise Sun rising over Little Houghton and the golf course.

- Location within South Yorkshire
- Population: 659 (2011)
- Metropolitan borough: Barnsley
- Metropolitan county: South Yorkshire
- Region: Yorkshire and the Humber
- Country: England
- Sovereign state: United Kingdom
- Post town: Barnsley
- Postcode district: S72
- Dialling code: 01226
- Police: South Yorkshire
- Fire: South Yorkshire
- Ambulance: Yorkshire
- UK Parliament: Barnsley South

Little Houghton is a hamlet and civil parish in the Metropolitan Borough of Barnsley, South Yorkshire, England. At the 2001 census it had a population of 618, increasing to 659 at the 2011 Census.

Access to the hamlet of Little Houghton is gained by travelling along Middlecliff Lane through the village of Middlecliffe. The larger village is made up of mainly council and ex-council houses.

The name Houghton derives from the Old English hōhtūn meaning 'settlement on a hill spur'.

Little Houghton was previously the site of two large coal mines. Houghton Main was a deep shaft mine and Dearne Valley a drift mine. Both mines are now closed and their sites have been landscaped, which has been partly funded by money from the European Union. Before the coal mines, the village was involved in agriculture and there were a number of farms in the village with associated cottages. Only two of the old farm buildings remain, but some have recently been converted into housing.

The two settlements come under Little Houghton Parish Council.

== Sports ==
In September 2006, Houghton Main, the local village cricket team won the Village Cup Final, held at Lord's Cricket Ground.
