= Penny Pie Park =

Park in Barnsley, South Yorkshire, England

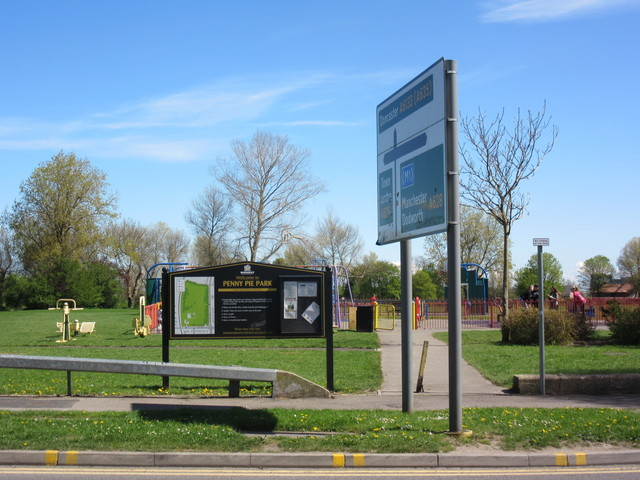
- Penny Pie Park in Pogmoor, Barnsley. Since the development of the gyratory the area is now known as Houghton's Folly.
- Interactive map of Penny Pie Park
- Type: Municipal
- Location: Barnsley, South Yorkshire
- Coordinates: 53.552398°N 1.509128°W
- Open: All year

Originally used as landfill site for domestic waste, the land that is now known as Penny Pie Park is a large recreational playing field and urban park, open to the public. After recent roadbuilding it is now encircled by the A628 gyratory. It is located in Pogmoor, Barnsley and is owned by the local council.

The park is approximately 350 metres by 250 metres in size and is bordered by various vegetation, including sycamore, willow and horsechestnut trees. A railway separates its northern edge from another council field which is situated opposite.

It contains multipurpose sports facilities and personal training fitness stations, as well as a vast area of green space, popular with runners and dog walkers. It is often used as a site for pigeon fanciers to race pigeons, and as a landing site for hot air balloons and air ambulances.

The field also hosts the annual Barnsley Mini Olympics, where locals compete in Olympic style events during the summer.
