= South Hiendley =

Village and civil parish in West Yorkshire, England

Coordinates: 53.608°N 1.401°W

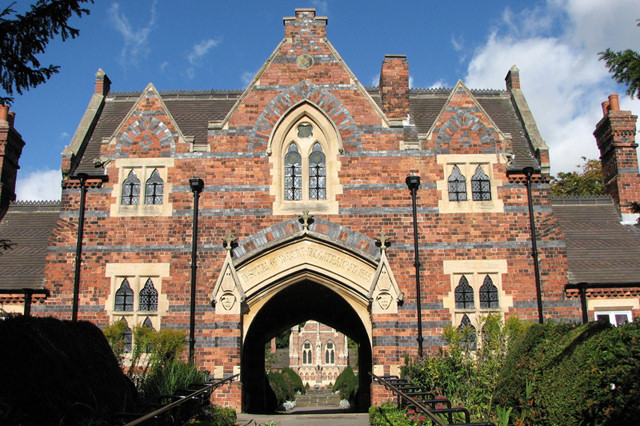
- South Hiendley Almshouses

- Location within West Yorkshire
- Population: 1,817 (2011)
- Metropolitan borough: City of Wakefield
- Metropolitan county: West Yorkshire
- Region: Yorkshire and the Humber
- Country: England
- Sovereign state: United Kingdom
- Post town: BARNSLEY
- Postcode district: S72
- Dialling code: 01226
- Police: West Yorkshire
- Fire: West Yorkshire
- Ambulance: Yorkshire
- UK Parliament: Hemsworth

South Hiendley is a village and civil parish near Barnsley but in the City of Wakefield council area in West Yorkshire, England. It has a population of 1,667, increasing to 1,817 at the 2011 Census. Until 1974 it was part of Hemsworth Rural District.

The village is on the edge of the county of West Yorkshire in the Wakefield area 8 miles (13 km) from the city centre. However it is marginally closer to the town of Barnsley 6 miles (10 km) just across the border in South Yorkshire. It has a Barnsley postcode (S72) and telephone code (01226), as well as being under the Postal Town of Barnsley and by default South Yorkshire.

The village has one public house, The Sun Inn, (the Fox Inn was demolished in 2013), a primary school (South Hiendley Junior Infant and Early Years School) and a Doctor's surgery.

Historically, South Hiendley is part of the West Riding of Yorkshire in the Wapentake of Staincross. The Wapentake almost corresponds with the current Barnsley Metropolitan Area, although a few settlements and townships within the Staincross Wapentake (such as South Hiendley) were put outside the Metropolitan Borough of Barnsley and, since April 1974, lie within the current West Yorkshire Metropolitan Area.

The name Hiendley derives from the Old English hindlēah meaning 'hind's (female deer) wood/clearing'.

== See also ==
- Listed buildings in South Hiendley
