= Crow Edge =

Hamlet in South Yorkshire, England

Coordinates: 53.538828°N 1.722364°W

Crow Edge, Barnsley
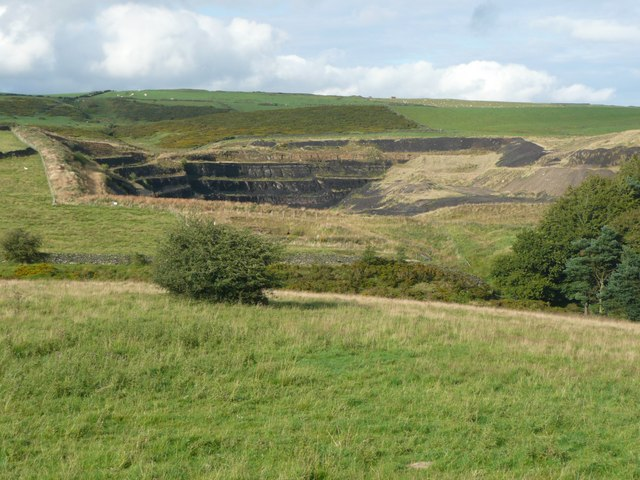
- Clay pit, off the A616

- Location within South Yorkshire
- Metropolitan borough: Barnsley
- Metropolitan county: South Yorkshire
- Region: Yorkshire and the Humber
- Country: England
- Sovereign state: United Kingdom
- Post town: Sheffield
- Postcode district: S36
- Dialling code: 01226
- Police: South Yorkshire
- Fire: South Yorkshire
- Ambulance: Yorkshire
- UK Parliament: Penistone and Stocksbridge

Crow Edge is a hamlet in Dunford civil parish, situated on the A616, in the metropolitan borough of Barnsley, South Yorkshire, England.

== Industry ==
Since about 1857 Crow Edge has been home to the Hepworth Iron Company's coal mines, fire clay pits and clay products works, later Hepworth Building Products Ltd.'s pipe works. From 2005 this has been part of the Dutch Wavin Group. In 2013, 50 acres of their site was sold to the British company R. Plevin and Sons Ltd. Thereby making the site, the largest waste wood recycling facility in the United Kingdom.

== Rail ==
From 1846 to 1950 Hazlehead Bridge railway station, on the Sheffield, Ashton-under-Lyne and Manchester Railway's Woodhead Line, provided a rail link for passenger traffic by bus service to Huddersfield, via Crow Edge and Honley. From 1857 to 1960 there was goods traffic on the mineral line from Hazlehead Bridge to Crow Edge, where the Hepworth Iron Company had an ironworks, collieries, coke ovens and a fireclay quarry.
