= Cubley, South Yorkshire =

Village in South Yorkshire, England

Coordinates: 53.51625°N 1.63482°W

Cubley
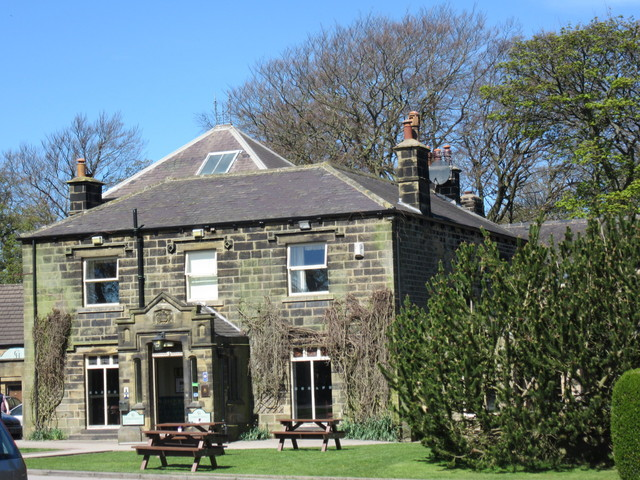
- Cubley Hall

- Location within South Yorkshire
- OS grid reference: SE243022
- Metropolitan borough: Barnsley
- Metropolitan county: South Yorkshire
- Region: Yorkshire and the Humber
- Country: England
- Sovereign state: United Kingdom
- Post town: SHEFFIELD
- Postcode district: S36
- Dialling code: 01226
- Police: South Yorkshire
- Fire: South Yorkshire
- Ambulance: Yorkshire
- UK Parliament: Penistone and Stocksbridge

Cubley is a village in the metropolitan borough of Barnsley in South Yorkshire, England. It is about a mile to the south of Penistone town centre and essentially is now a part of Penistone. The village falls within the Penistone West ward of Barnsley MBC.

Originally Cubley consisted of the few houses now on the south edge of the village and the associated nearby farms and Cubley Hall (initially a farm and country residence, then a children's home and now a pub, restaurant and hotel). Now, due to extensive building in the 20th and early 21st centuries, these old cottages are now connected right up to Penistone town itself.

Cubley currently has no shops or other services (other than Cubley Hall), and no schools: most children go to St John the Baptist Infant and Junior Schools in Penistone and then on to Penistone Grammar School.

== History ==
Before the 20th century Cubley was little more than a collection of cottages, a few farms and Cubley Hall. The cottages that made up Cubley are now referred to as 'Old Cubley' and lie at the southern edge of Cubley, furthest from Penistone. During the first 30 years of the 20th century, a number of houses were built along the main road from Penistone. Sporadically this house building continued throughout the 20th century.

The vinegar brewery used to sit at Cubley Brook at the bottom of the big dip in the road from Penistone. This closed in the 1960s or 1970s. The land was mostly converted into houses during the 1980s.

Before the 1960s there was a shop, which was part of a large house on Mortimer Road, adjacent to where Hackings Avenue forked away from Mortimer Road. This was run by a Miss Credland. From the 1960s a bungalow on Mortimer Road (just before Cubley Hall on the road from Penistone) had its garage converted into a shop. This was the only shop in Cubley. Some point before the early 1990s this shop closed and left Cubley totally reliant on the shops in Penistone.

During the 1990s an attempt was made to build on the land between Cubley and old Cubley. This failed when the company funding the project went bankrupt. This left two half built buildings.

Around the turn of the Millennium or possibly a few years either side the last large building project in Cubley happened - the construction of a new housing estate to the south of the houses in Cubley. This finally joined up the cottages of old Cubley with a continuous line of development right into Penistone town.

== See also ==
- Listed buildings in Penistone
