= Gilroyd =

Village in South Yorkshire, England

Coordinates: 53.53705°N 1.51110°W

Gilroyd is a village in the Metropolitan Borough of Barnsley in South Yorkshire, England. The village falls within the Dodworth ward of Barnsley MBC.
