= Metropolitan Borough of Barnsley =

Borough of Barnsley
- Metropolitan borough
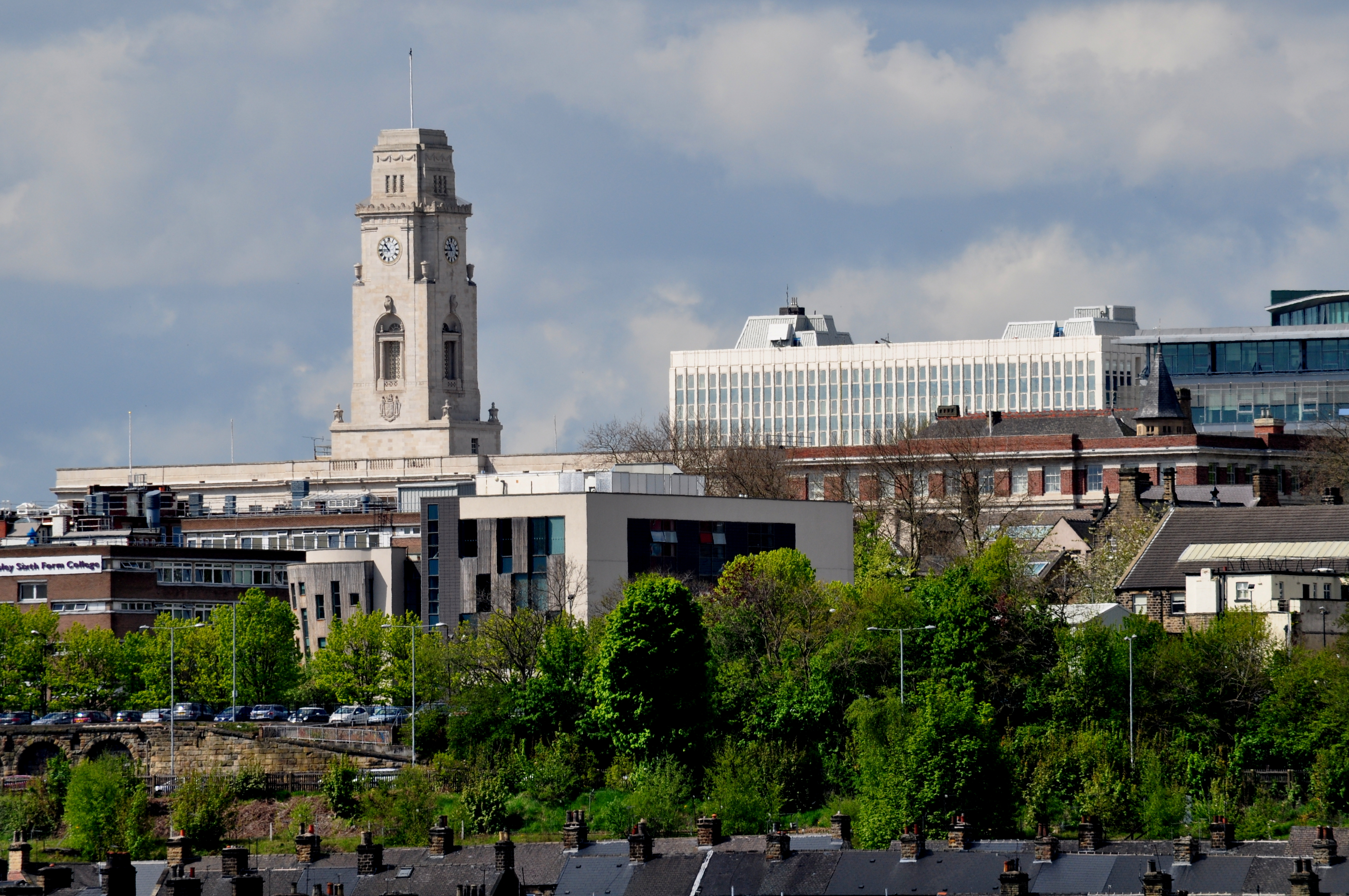
- Barnsley, the largest settlement and administrative centre of the borough.

- Arms of Barnsley Metropolitan Borough Council

- Barnsley Metropolitan Borough shown within South Yorkshire
- Coordinates: 53°33′N 1°28′W
- Sovereign state: United Kingdom
- Constituent country: England
- Region: Yorkshire and the Humber
- Ceremonial county: South Yorkshire
- Admin. HQ: Barnsley

Government
  - Type: Barnsley Metropolitan Borough Council
  - Leadership: Leader & Cabinet
  - Executive: Reform UK
  - MPs: John Healey (Lab.), Dan Jarvis (Lab.), Stephanie Peacock (Lab.), Marie Tidball (Lab.)

Area
  - Total: 127 sq mi (329 km^{2})
  - Rank: 114th

Population (2024)
  - Total: 251,770
  - Rank: Ranked 75th
  - Density: 1,980/sq mi (765/km^{2})

Ethnicity (2021)
  - Ethnic groups: List: 96.9% White; 0.9% Asian; 0.9% Mixed; 0.7% Black; 0.5% other

Religion (2021)
  - Religion: List: 51.3% Christianity; 42.1% no religion; 5.2% not stated; 0.6% Islam; 0.4% other; 0.2% % Buddhism; 0.2% Hinduism; 0.1% Sikhism; 0.1% Judaism
- Time zone: UTC+0 (Greenwich Mean Time)
  - Summer (DST): UTC+1 (British Summer Time)
- ISO 3166-2: GB-BNS
- ONS code: 00CC (ONS); E08000016 (GSS)
- Website: barnsley.gov.uk

The Metropolitan Borough of Barnsley is a metropolitan borough in South Yorkshire, England; the town is Barnsley and other notable towns include Hoyland, Penistone and Wombwell. Additionally some notable villages in the borough include Birdwell, Bolton upon Dearne, Cudworth, Dodworth, Goldthorpe, Royston and Thurnscoe.

The borough is bisected by the M1 motorway; it is rural to the west, and largely urban/industrial to the east. It is estimated that around 16% of the borough is classed as urban overall, with this area being home to the vast majority of its residents. Additionally, 68% of Barnsley's 32,863 hectares is green belt and 9% is national park land, the majority of which is west of the M1. In 2007, it was estimated that Barnsley had 224,600 residents, measured at the 2011 census as 231,221.

The neighbouring districts are Doncaster, Rotherham, Sheffield, High Peak, Kirklees and Wakefield.

== History ==
The borough was created on 1 April 1974 under the Local Government Act 1972. It covered the whole area of 12 former districts and parts of another two, which were all abolished at the same time:

- Barnsley County Borough
- Cudworth Urban District
- Darfield Urban District
- Darton Urban District
- Dearne Urban District
- Dodworth Urban District
- Hemsworth Rural District (part, being the parishes of Billingley, Brierley, Great Houghton, Little Houghton and Shafton)
- Hoyland Nether Urban District
- Penistone Rural District
- Penistone Urban District
- Royston Urban District
- Wombwell Urban District
- Worsbrough Urban District
- Wortley Rural District (part, being the parishes of Tankersley and Wortley)

The county borough of Barnsley had been self-governing, whereas the other 13 districts were all lower-tier authorities where county-level services were provided by West Riding County Council.

From its creation in 1974 until 1986, the Metropolitan Borough of Barnsley was a district-level authority, with county-level services provided by South Yorkshire County Council. The county council was abolished in 1986, since when Barnsley has been responsible for all local government services.

The borough forms part of the South Yorkshire Mayoral Combined Authority.

Much of the modern Metropolitan Borough of Barnsley made up the historic Wapentake of Staincross, areas such as Denby Dale, Clayton West, South Hiendley, Hemsworth, Woolley, Notton, Old Royston, West Bretton, Scissett, Ryhill, Havercroft etc., were part of the Wapentake area but now fall outside the Borough within neighbouring West Yorkshire. Other villages and suburbs outside the Barnsley Metropolitan Borough but with strong historical connections to the Barnsley area are Brampton Bierlow, Wentworth and areas of the Dearne Valley.

== Governance ==
Elections to the council were formerly held in three out of every four years, with one third of the 63 councillors elected at each election. Following boundary changes, all 63 seats were contested in the 2026 election, in which Reform UK took control of the council, ending Labour control dating back to the council’s creation in 1974.

The borough council appoints one councillor to be the mayor every year. On the day of the mayor's appointment, a parade takes place in front of the town hall in honour of the new mayor.

Since the 2023 Boundary review and the 2024 General election, Barnsley borough is represented by three MPs: Dan Jarvis for Barnsley North (Labour), Marie Tidball for Penistone & Stocksbridge (Labour), and Stephanie Peacock for Barnsley South (Labour).

== Towns, wards and villages ==
- Ardsley, Athersley
- Barnsley, Barugh, Barugh Green, Billingley, Birdwell, Blacker Hill, Bolton upon Dearne, Brierley
- Cortonwood, Carlecotes, Carlton, Cawthorne, Crow Edge, Cubley, Cudworth, Crane Moor
- Darfield, Darton, Dodworth, Dunford Bridge
- Elsecar
- Gawber, Gilroyd, Goldthorpe, Great Houghton, Green Moor, Grimethorpe, Gunthwaite
- Haigh, Hemingfield, High Hoyland, Higham, Honeywell, Hood Green, High Hoyland, Hoyland, Hoyland Common, Hoylandswaine, Hunshelf
- Ingbirchworth
- Jump
- Kendray, Kexbrough, Kingstone
- Langsett, Little Houghton, Lundwood
- Mapplewell, Millhouses, Millhouse Green, Monk Bretton
- New Lodge
- Old Town, Oxspring
- Platts Common, Penistone, Pilley, Pogmoor
- Royston, Redbrook, Rockley
- Shafton, Silkstone, Silkstone Common, Smithies, Spring Vale, Stainborough, Staincross, Stairfoot
- Tankersley, Thurgoland, Thurlstone, Thurnscoe
- Ward Green, Wilthorpe, Woolley Colliery, Wombwell, Wortley, Worsbrough Bridge, Worsbrough Dale, Worsbro Common, Worsbrough Village

There are several settlements with Hoyland in their name in the Barnsley Area – in the south of the Borough there is the market town of Hoyland in the Hoyland Nether district (Nether being Old Norse for "Lower"), Hoyland Nether also includes Hoyland Common, Upper Hoyland, et cetera. Hoylandswaine is located on the opposite side of the wide valley, to the west of Barnsley and at almost 1000 feet above sea level. Also further North is High Hoyland. The word Hoyland is derived from Norse, the first element meaning "high" or "tall". The last element is land which means "land" or "district". The name is also seen in Norway: Høyland Municipality, Høyland Church, Høylandet Municipality.

== Education ==
There are over 100 schools and colleges in the borough. State education is managed by Barnsley Local Education Authority. There are 14 state-run secondary schools and around 80 primary schools. There was an independent school, Hope House School. Post-16 education is provided at Barnsley College and the sixth form of Penistone Grammar School. An adult education college, Northern College, is located at Wentworth Castle in Stainborough.

== Media ==
In terms of television, the area is served by BBC Yorkshire and ITV Yorkshire broadcasting from the Emley Moor transmitter.

Radio stations for the area are:

BBC Local Radio

- BBC Radio Sheffield

Independent Local Radio

- Heart Yorkshire
- Capital Yorkshire
- Hits Radio South Yorkshire
- Greatest Hits Radio South Yorkshire (formerly Dearne FM)

Community Radio

- Penistone FM (serving Penistone and Stocksbridge)

The local newspaper for the area is the Barnsley Chronicle.

== Places of interest ==
- Barnsley Town Hall
- Bretton Country Park
- Cannon Hall
- Cannon Hall Farm
- Cooper Art Gallery
- Elsecar Heritage Centre
- Lowe Stand
- Monk Bretton Priory
- Wentworth Castle
- Worsbrough Mill Museum & Country Park

== See also ==
- List of mayors of Barnsley
