= Old Town, Barnsley =

Area of Barnsley, South Yorkshire, England

Coordinates: 53.563°N 1.483°W

Old Town is an area of Barnsley in South Yorkshire, England. It is also the name of a ward of Barnsley Metropolitan Borough Council.
