= Jump, South Yorkshire =

Village in South Yorkshire, England

Coordinates: 53.506300°N 1.427000°W

Jump
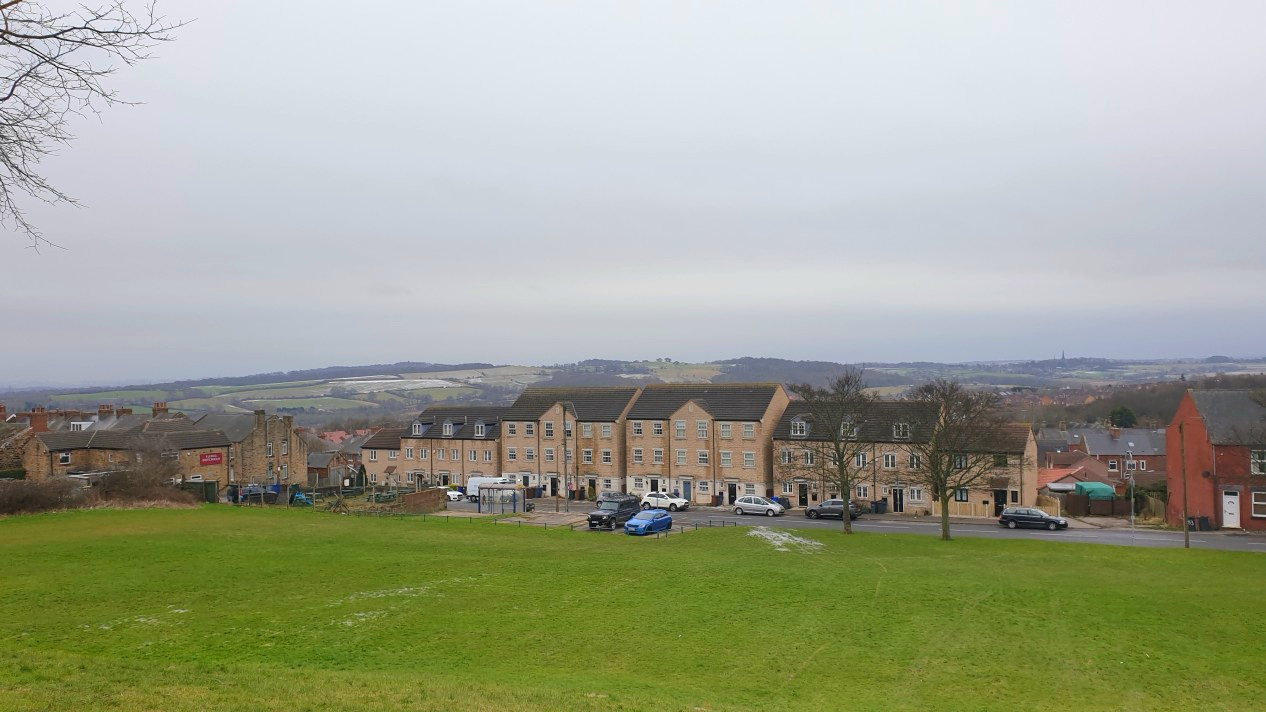
- Jump, as seen from the north

- Location within South Yorkshire
- OS grid reference: SE381012
- Metropolitan borough: Barnsley
- Metropolitan county: South Yorkshire
- Region: Yorkshire and the Humber
- Country: England
- Sovereign state: United Kingdom
- Post town: BARNSLEY
- Postcode district: S74
- Dialling code: 01226
- Police: South Yorkshire
- Fire: South Yorkshire
- Ambulance: Yorkshire

Jump is a village in the metropolitan borough of Barnsley in South Yorkshire, England. It is north-east of Hoyland, separated from it by the Jump Valley, through which a stream runs.

Until 1974, Jump was part of the Wombwell Urban District, in the West Riding of Yorkshire. Jump came under the Hoyland STD dialling code area 022 674 until around 1980.

== History ==
Flints from the late Mesolithic have been found in the Roebuck Hill area, along with Neolithic and Bronze Age material. No evidence of permanent settlement has been found from these periods. Pre-Roman Iron Age settlement of the area is known of because of post-holes, indicating the presence of a late-Iron Age roundhouse. A locally made beehive quern is one of many artefacts found at the site. Later Post-Medieval use of the site shows the construction of a kiln, possibly used to produce iron.

== Amenities ==
The parish church is St George's, in the Diocese of Sheffield.

Jump has a Working Mens Club and a small selection of pubs:

- The Flying Dutchman
- The Coach And Horses
- The Wellington Inn

Also, the village hosts a traditional Fish and Chip shop, and world famous Percy Turners' Butcher's Shop, a hairdresser salon, a convenience store and a Post Office. Recently opening in the village is a Sure Start nursery school, which is in the centre of the village. The village also has a local school for young children, Jump Primary School.

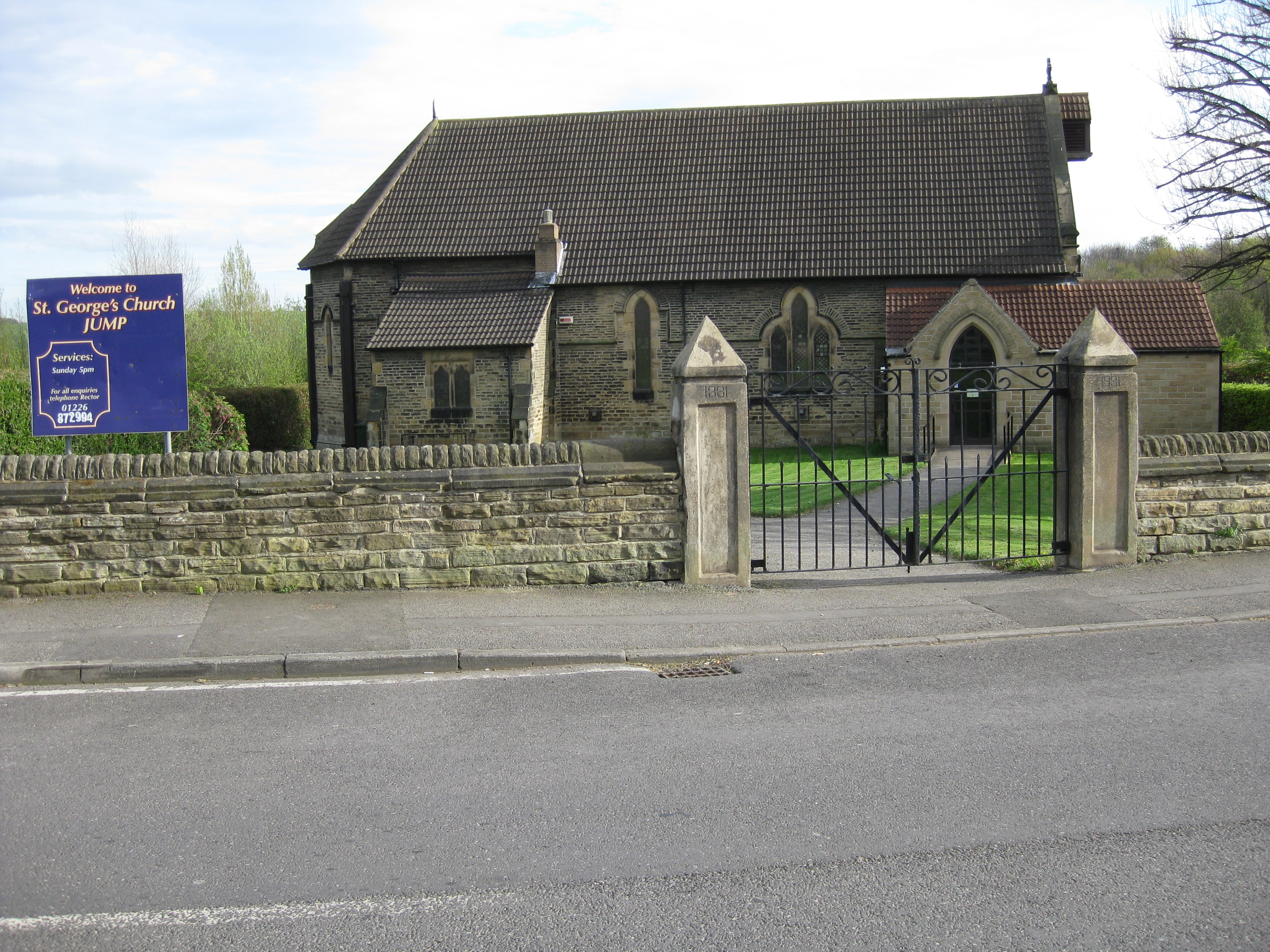
St George's Church

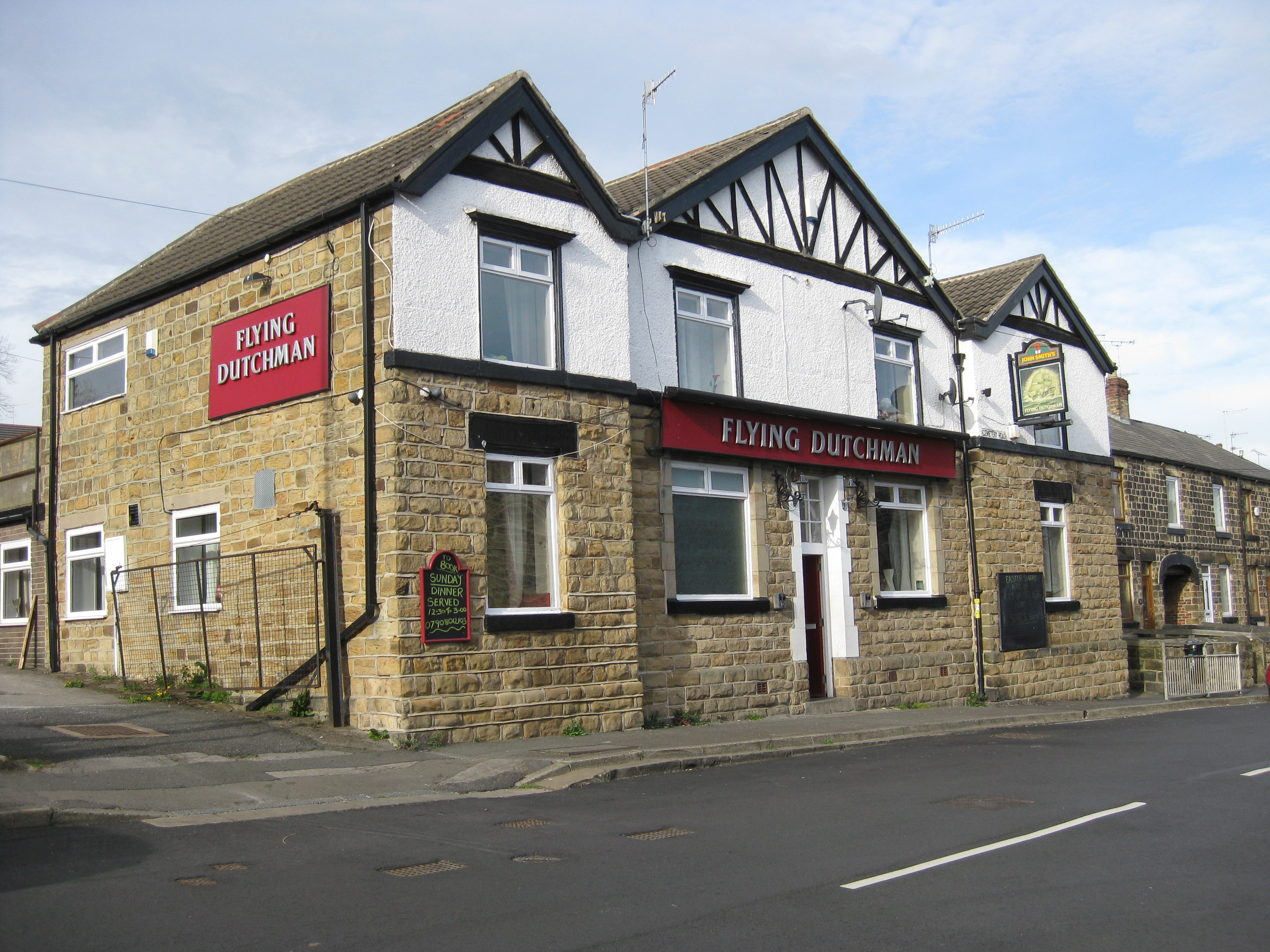
The Flying Dutchman

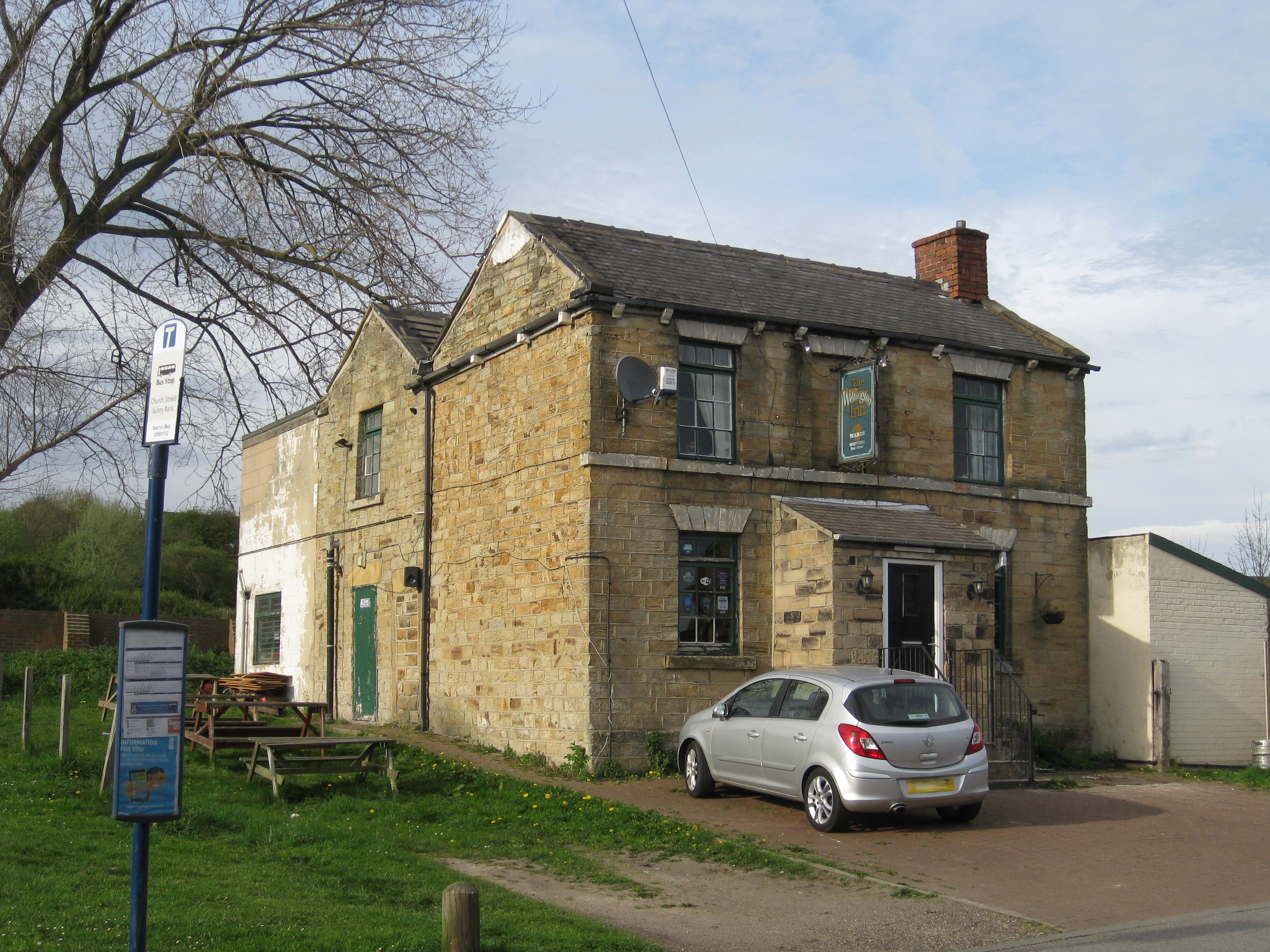
The Wellington

== Sport ==
Two football teams from the village have competed in the FA Cup: Jump Working Mens Club F.C. (season 1920–21) and Jump Home Guard F.C. (during 1949–51).

== Transport ==
The village is accessible by public transport via two bus routes, the 66 (one way), which runs approximately every ten minutes and the Jump Circular 67, which runs in both directions every hour. The nearest railway station is just a short walk up the hill in Elsecar.
