= Hoylandswaine =

Village in South Yorkshire, England

Coordinates: 53.539°N 1.603°W

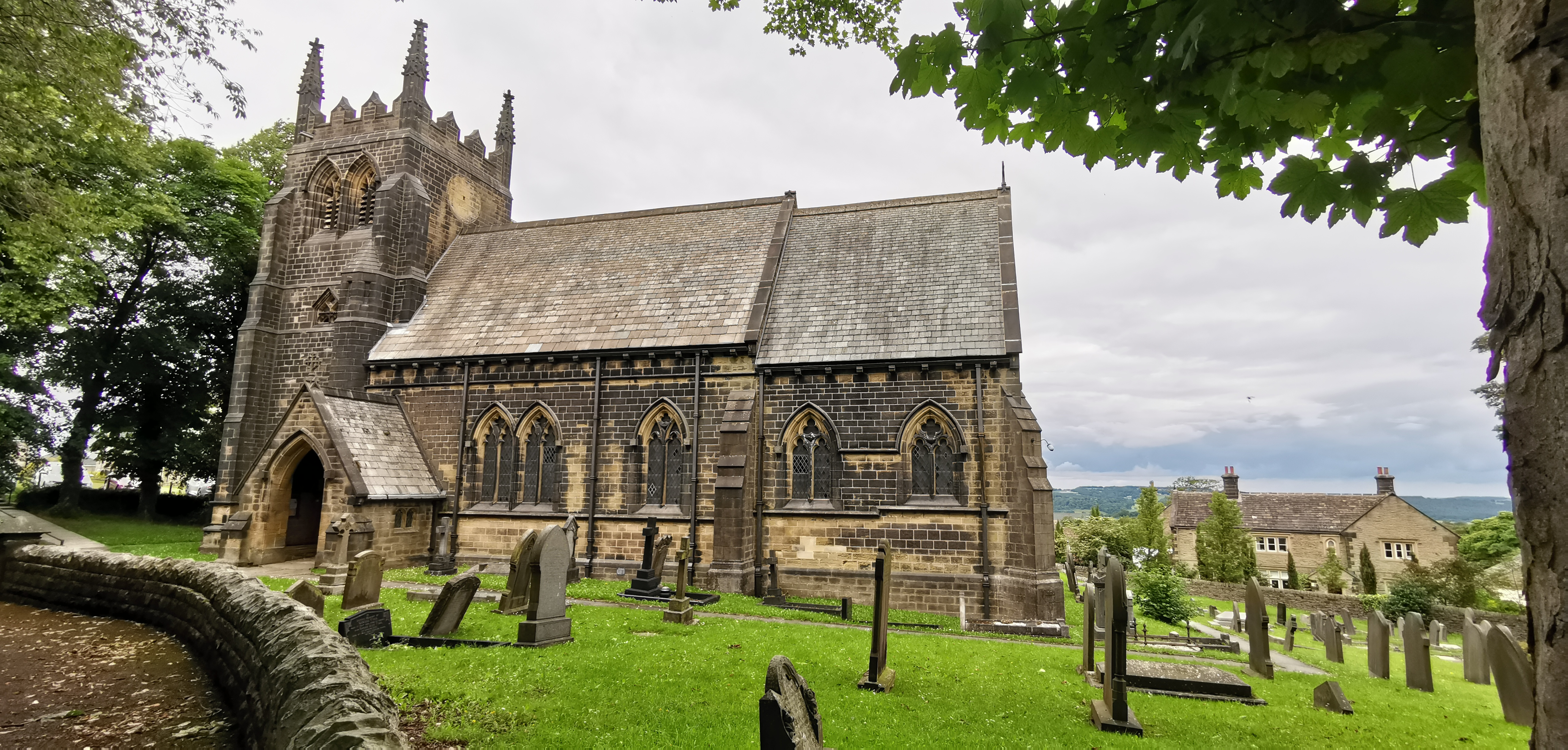
- Saint John the Evangelist Church, Hoylandswaine

- Location within South Yorkshire
- Area: 0.3847 km^{2} (0.1485 sq mi)
- Population: 1,038 (2021 census)
  - Density: 2,698/km^{2} (6,990/sq mi)
- OS grid reference: SE 263 048
- Civil parish: Penistone
- Metropolitan borough: Barnsley
- Metropolitan county: South Yorkshire
- Region: Yorkshire and the Humber
- Country: England
- Sovereign state: United Kingdom
- Post town: SHEFFIELD
- Postcode district: S36
- Dialling code: 01226
- Police: South Yorkshire
- Fire: South Yorkshire
- Ambulance: Yorkshire

Hoylandswaine is a village in the civil parish of Penistone, in the Barnsley district, in the county of South Yorkshire, England. In 2021 it had a population of 1038. Until 1974 it was in the West Riding of Yorkshire.

Located between Silkstone and Penistone and west of the M1 along the A628 it enjoys easy access to more significant locales such as Barnsley, Manchester, Huddersfield, Sheffield and Leeds.

Located on a historic salt track and once a nail-making and agricultural village, today, Hoylandswaine is part of the affluent commuter village belt to the west of Barnsley.

== Local events ==
Annually, there is a "Scarecrow Festival". The festival consists of villagers creating their own scarecrows, often with locally sourced hay, and placing them around the village. Children can then go and, for a small cost, pick up a sheet with activities relating to the scarecrows.

== History ==
The name Hoyland derives from the Old English hōhland meaning 'land on a hill spur'. The origin of Swaine is uncertain but is thought to derive from either two possible medieval tenants, Swein (died 1129) or Swane de Hoiland, who witnessed a deed here in 1189-1200.

Hoyland Swaine was recorded in the Domesday Book as Holan(de)/Holant. Hoylandswaine was formerly a township in the parish of Silkstone, in 1866 Hoyland Swaine became a separate civil parish, in 1894 Hoyland Swaine became an urban district, on 1 April 1938 the parish was abolished and merged with Penistone and the district was abolished and merged with Penistone Urban District. In 1931 the parish had a population of 792.

Historically, Hoylandswaine produced nails. The nail forge ceased operations shortly after the Second World War, and is currently a Grade II listed building. The forge is normally open to the public in September.

== Education ==
The local school primary school is Hoylandswaine Primary School, located within the village. The majority of secondary students go to Penistone Grammar School.

== See also ==
- Listed buildings in Penistone
