= Gawber =

Area of Barnsley in South Yorkshire, England

Coordinates: 53.5606°N 1.5132°W

- Location within South Yorkshire
- OS grid reference: SE323072
- Metropolitan borough: Barnsley
- Metropolitan county: South Yorkshire
- Region: Yorkshire and the Humber
- Country: England
- Sovereign state: United Kingdom
- Post town: BARNSLEY
- Postcode district: S75
- Dialling code: 01226
- Police: South Yorkshire
- Fire: South Yorkshire
- Ambulance: Yorkshire
- UK Parliament: Barnsley North

Gawber is an area of Barnsley in South Yorkshire, England. The area falls within the Darton West ward of the Barnsley MBC. There is a primary school, Gawber Primary School, a preschool, Gawber Pre-School, and a church, St Thomas.

The origin of the place-name is from the Old English words galga and beorg meaning gallows hill and appears as Galgbergh in 1304.

In A Topographical Dictionary of England (1848) Gawber is noted for its collieries. The North Gawber Colliery which closed in 1988 was located to the north in Mapplewell and the East Gawber Hall Colliery, of which the buried remains of the colliery fanhouse are a scheduled monument, was to the north-east of Gawber.
