= Barugh Green =

Village in South Yorkshire, England

Coordinates: 53.568°N 1.532°W

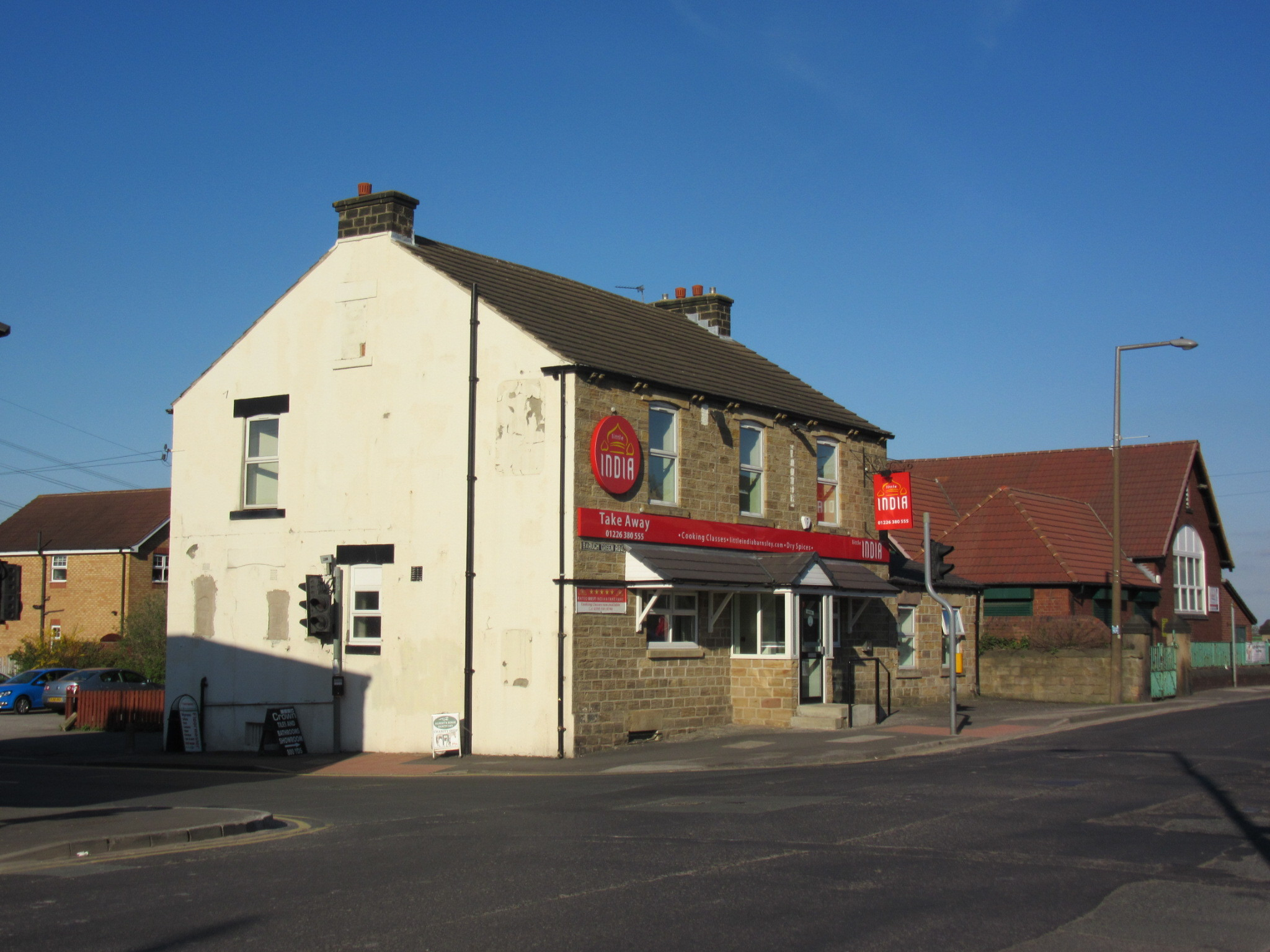
- Indian Restaurant in Barugh Green

- Location within South Yorkshire
- OS grid reference: SE310080
- Metropolitan borough: Barnsley
- Metropolitan county: South Yorkshire
- Region: Yorkshire and the Humber
- Country: England
- Sovereign state: United Kingdom
- Post town: BARNSLEY
- Postcode district: S75
- Dialling code: 01226
- Police: South Yorkshire
- Fire: South Yorkshire
- Ambulance: Yorkshire
- UK Parliament: Barnsley North

Barugh Green (locally pronounced as Bark Green or occasionally mis-pronounced as Bart Green) is a semi-rural commuter village in the metropolitan borough of Barnsley in South Yorkshire, England. The village falls within the Barnsley Metropolitan Council Ward of Darton West.

Like many other villages, Barugh Green has lost some of its heritage and cultural identity in the past 30 years. The once central Phoenix Inn public house closed in 1999 and the Spencers Arms closed in 2010 (now Little India, a takeaway which has a unique cooking school), leaving only Barugh Green Working Men's Club and the newly renovated Crown and Anchor.
