= Mapplewell =

Village in South Yorkshire, England

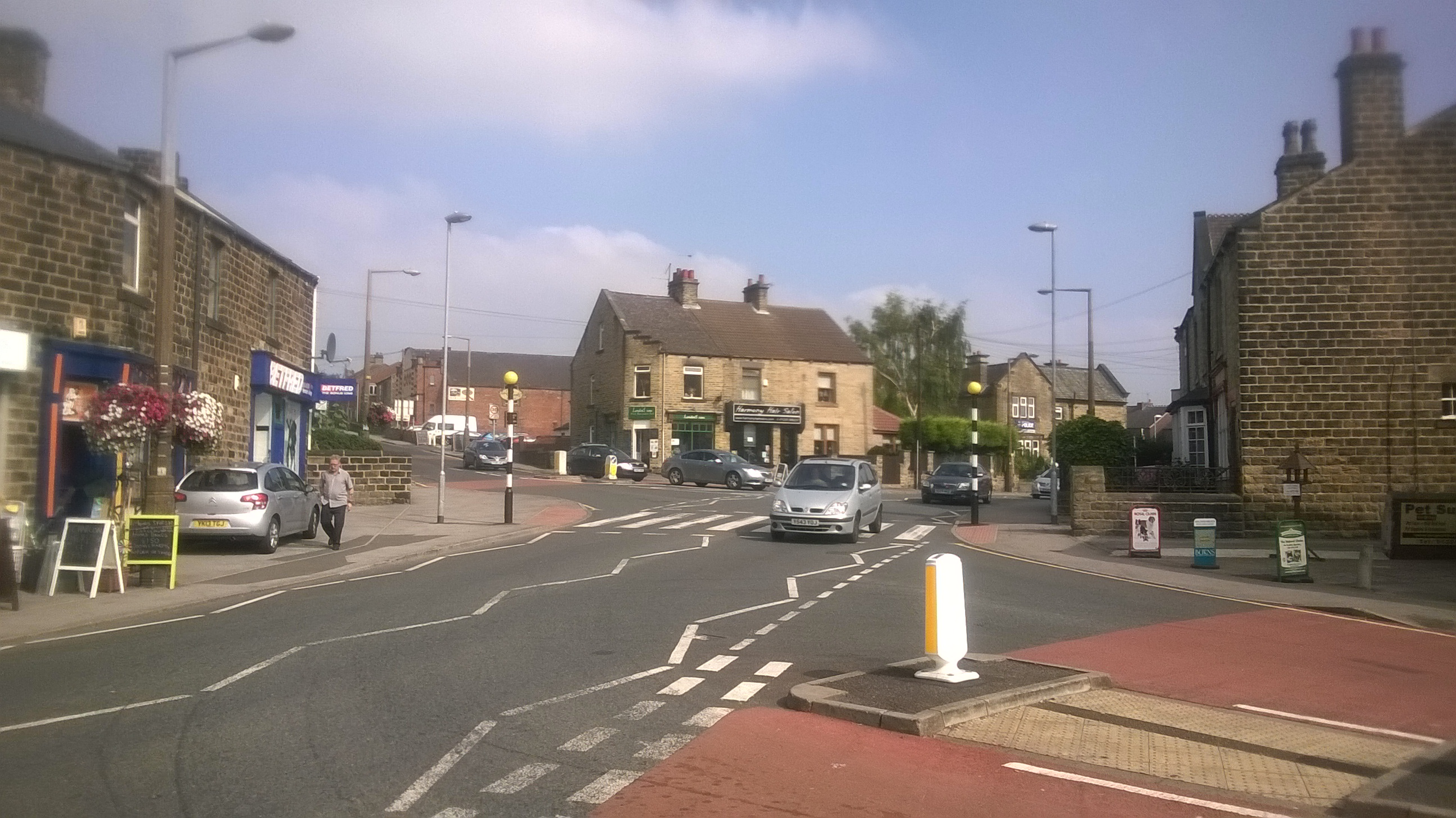
- Main junction at Mapplewell village

- Location within South Yorkshire
- Population: 4,000 (2001)
- Metropolitan borough: Barnsley
- Metropolitan county: South Yorkshire
- Region: Yorkshire and the Humber
- Country: England
- Sovereign state: United Kingdom
- Post town: BARNSLEY
- Postcode district: S75
- Dialling code: 01226
- Police: South Yorkshire
- Fire: South Yorkshire
- Ambulance: Yorkshire
- UK Parliament: Barnsley North

Mapplewell is a village within the Metropolitan Borough of Barnsley, in South Yorkshire, England. The village currently falls within the Barnsley MBC ward of Darton East.

== History ==
Mapplewell began life as a hamlet within the Staincross Wapentake. As it grew in size it began to merge with neighbouring hamlet, Staincross and ever since the histories of the villages have been linked together. As in Staincross, nail making was an important industry in Mapplewell in the 17th century. However, by the late 19th century mining was the predominant source of employment, after the sinking of a deep mine in North Gawber. In 1761, John Wesley preached in Mapplewell, at a time when villagers had to go west to worship at the church in neighbouring Darton. After Wesley's visit, many chapels were built in the village, of which only a few remain.

== Geography ==
Mapplewell lies around three miles north of Barnsley, and eight miles south of Wakefield situated at approximately 53°35′11″N 1°30′9″W and at an elevation of around 328 feet (100 m) above sea level.

== Education ==
Mapplewell Primary School is in the village and was rated "Outstanding" by Ofsted in 2012.

== Sport ==
The village was represented in the FA Cup by Mapplewell and Staincross Athletic F.C.
