= New Lodge, South Yorkshire =

Area of Barnsley, South Yorkshire, England

Coordinates: 53.579°N 1.480°W

New Lodge is a housing estate in Barnsley in South Yorkshire, England.

The 'New Lodge' estate is located to the north of Barnsley on the A61 near Athersley.

The earliest reference to New Lodge dates from 1377, when the area was referred to as 'Newe Laythes', becoming New Laithes in 1541. New Laithes was originally one of the granges (farms) belonging to Monk Bretton Priory. Following the dissolution of the priory in 1539, the land was bought by the Blythman family, who would live at New Laithes for more than two hundred years. The land was eventually sold by descendants of the Blythmans to John Carr in 1769.

Maps from 1850 show 8 or 9 farm outbuildings at New Lodge, together with the large stone built manor house with its long carriageway and the 'Roundhouse' lodge on the Wakefield Turnpike (now the A61). The manor house was built in the late 18th century by the York architect John Carr for his nephew John Clarke. The land for the house was purchased in 1769. The 'Roundhouse', an unusual eight-sided building, was demolished in the mid-20th century, and its site is now occupied by the Roundhouse Medical Centre. The manor house remained in private hands until the 1940s; it subsequently became a private club until it was purchased by Barnsley Borough Council in 1947 and converted into a home for elderly ladies in 1950. The home was closed down in 1990 and the historic building was badly vandalised, but restored and extended as a private residential home in 1992.

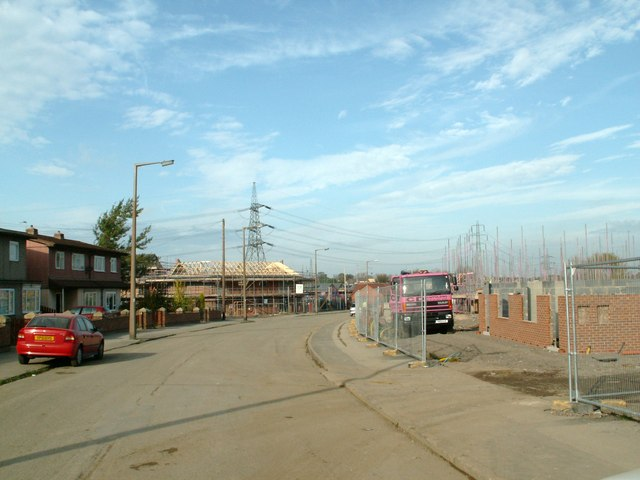
New Lodge Crescent with Tarran houses (left) and new homes being constructed (2009)

Today New Lodge is a predominantly council housing estate. Prior to the Second World War, the area was mostly farmland, but was purchased by Barnsley Council in 1946 for the express purpose of creating a new housing estate. A document of conveyance dated 16 November 1946, recording the purchase of the land from the Barn-Murdoch family by Barnsley Council for a sum of £7,750, can be found in the Athersley Archives. Factory built houses, or prefabs, comprise most of the estate. These are of the concrete section Tarran type, and the BISF houses, known as the 'tin houses'. By the late 1940s there was a thriving community of predominantly mining families and the estate was completed in the early 1950s with conventional brick houses.

Regent Crescent and Park Avenue were called New Lodge before the council estate was built. The estate is currently undergoing a renovation, with the replacement of some of the Tarran houses and major upgrades to the remaining stock.
