= Great Houghton, South Yorkshire =

Village and civil parish in South Yorkshire, England

Coordinates: 53.55°N 1.35°W

Great Houghton
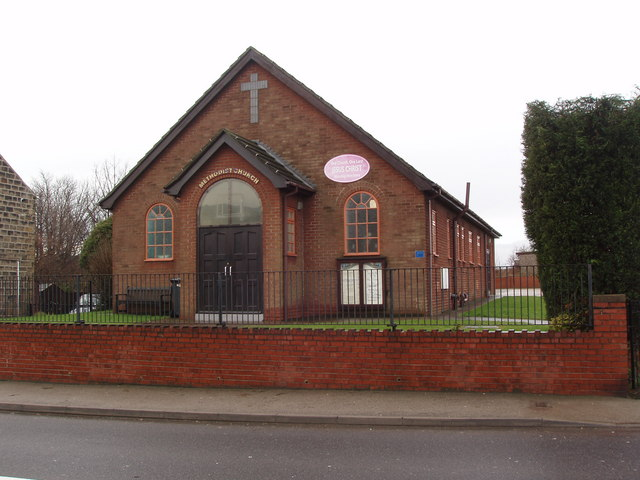
- Great Houghton Methodist Church

- Location within South Yorkshire
- Population: 2,475 (2011)
- OS grid reference: SE432065
- Civil parish: Great Houghton
- Metropolitan borough: Barnsley
- Metropolitan county: South Yorkshire
- Region: Yorkshire and the Humber
- Country: England
- Sovereign state: United Kingdom
- Post town: BARNSLEY
- Postcode district: S72
- Dialling code: 01226
- Police: South Yorkshire
- Fire: South Yorkshire
- Ambulance: Yorkshire
- UK Parliament: Barnsley North

Great Houghton is a village and civil parish in the Metropolitan Borough of Barnsley in South Yorkshire, England), on the border with West Yorkshire. It lies to the west of Thurnscoe, on the B6411 road. At the 2001 census it had a population of 2,261, increasing to 2,475 at the 2011 census.

The name Houghton derives from the Old English hōhtūn meaning 'settlement on a hill spur'.

Great Houghton is a former mining village and its mines were served by the railway, which has since gone, but remains are still visible. The village has a Miners Welfare Hall which was built and completed in 1923 and handed over to Great Houghton Parish Council soon after. In 2024 Barnsley MBC funded The Miners Welfare Hall's full renovation under its Local Centre's Renovation works. Further works are planned in 2025 under the same funding initiative.

The village had a primary school called Sandhill. The old school building that stood on the main street was demolished in 2007 and was replaced with a new Private Finance Initiative primary school.

The village has a church, St Michael's All Angels.

Some parts of Great Houghton were affected by the 2007 summer flooding, which caused extensive damage in neighbouring villages.
