= Staincross Wapentake =

Former division of the West Riding of Yorkshire, England

Coordinates: 53.5742°N 1.5031°W

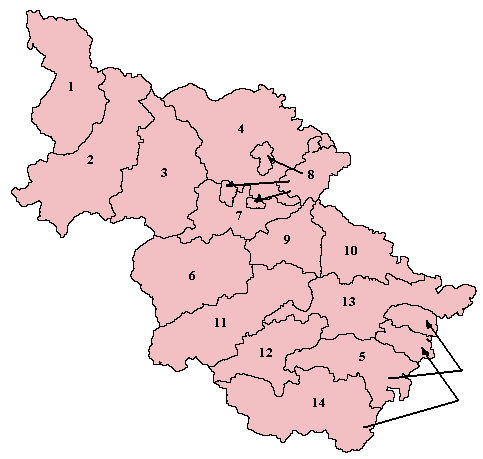
Wapentakes of the West Riding. Staincross is labelled 12 on the map.

Staincross was a wapentake, an administrative division (or ancient district), in the historic county of the West Riding of Yorkshire. It consisted of seven parishes, and included the towns of Barnsley, Penistone, Worsbrough and Hemsworth. The area almost corresponds with the modern day Metropolitan Borough of Barnsley.

== History ==
The wapentake was named after the village of Staincross and included the parishes of Cawthorne, Darton, Felkirk, Hemsworth, High Hoyland, Penistone, Royston, (Note: Sometimes spelt as Roystone) Silkstone (including Barnsley) and Tankersley and parts of Darfield. Of the nine wapentakes in the West Riding of Yorkshire, Staincross had the lowest population density, which was recorded in 1867 as 27,089.

The original meeting place of the wapentake is believed to have been in, or near, to the village of Staincross, similar to the wapentakes at Ewcross and Osgoldcross. The name derives from the Old Norse of stein-kross, literally, stone cross.

Originally located in the West Riding of Yorkshire, most of area in Staincross Wapentake is now within the metropolitan county of South Yorkshire, and the rest is in West Yorkshire. The original boundaries were with the wapentakes of Agbrigg to the north, Osgoldcross to the east and Strafforth to the south and south east. On the western edge, the wapentake bordered the Hamestan Hundred of Cheshire. It was estimated to have covered an area of 130 square miles (340 km^{2}). According to Domesday records, a smaller portion, geographically removed from the rest of the wapentake, was located at the village of Adlingfleet where the rivers Ouse and Trent converge.

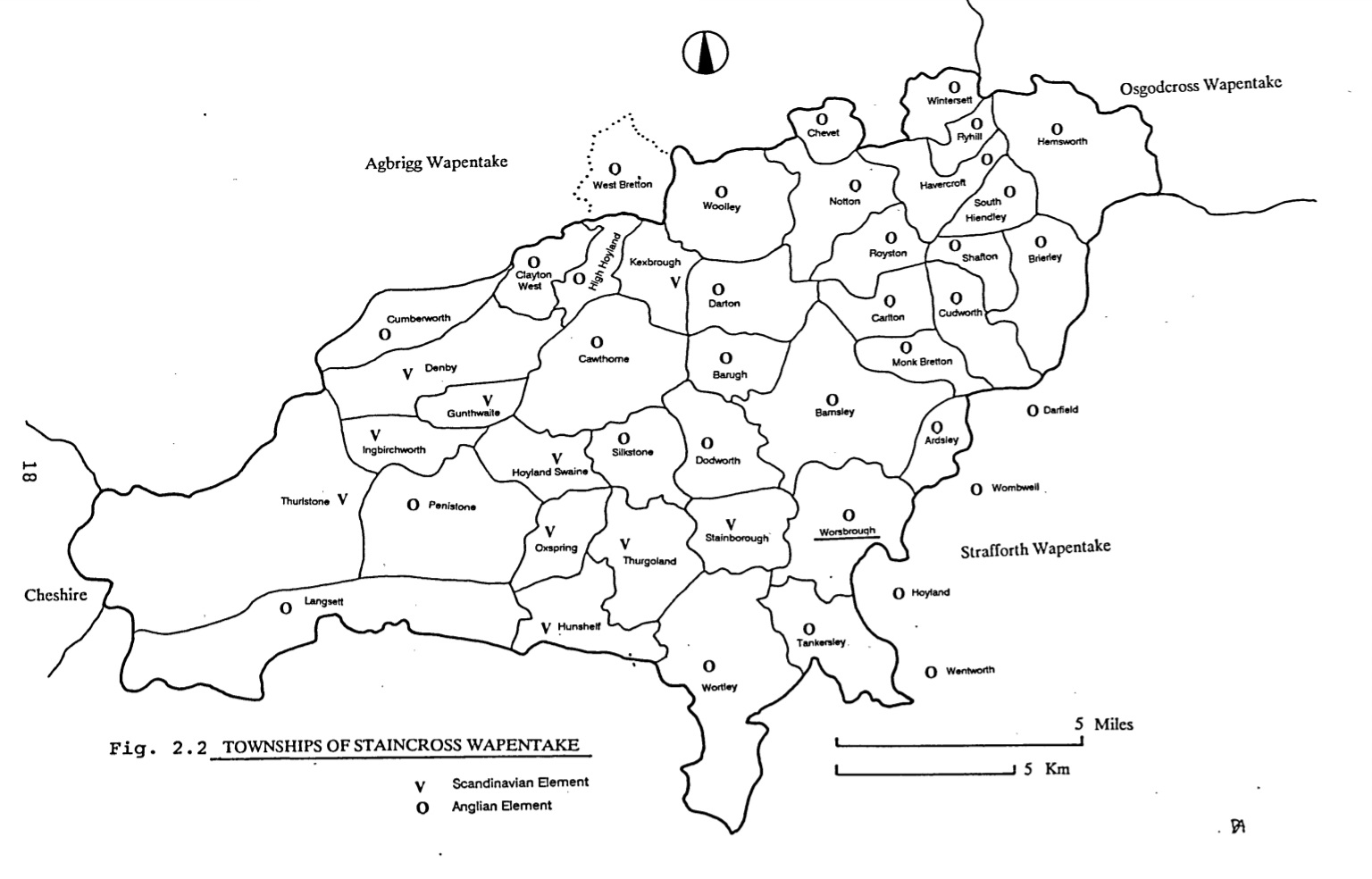
Staincross Wapentake & districts

Much of the wapentake corresponds with the current Metropolitan Borough of Barnsley including towns and villages outside the Staincross wapentake, in the Dearne Valley such as Wombwell, Hoyland Nether, Goldthorpe, Thurnscoe and Bolton upon Dearne. Some villages and townships from the Staincross Wapentake are now in the post-1974 county of West Yorkshire namely Denby Dale, Scissett, Clayton West, West Bretton, Woolley, Notton, South Hiendley, Old Royston, Ryhill, Havercroft, and Hemsworth .

The River Dearne ran from the north west to the south east of the wapentake.

Although some distance from the village of Staincross, the Church of All Saints, Silkstone, was sometimes known as the "Mother Church" of the wapentake.
