= Kendray =

Area of Barnsley, South Yorkshire, England

Coordinates: 53.545°N 1.459°W

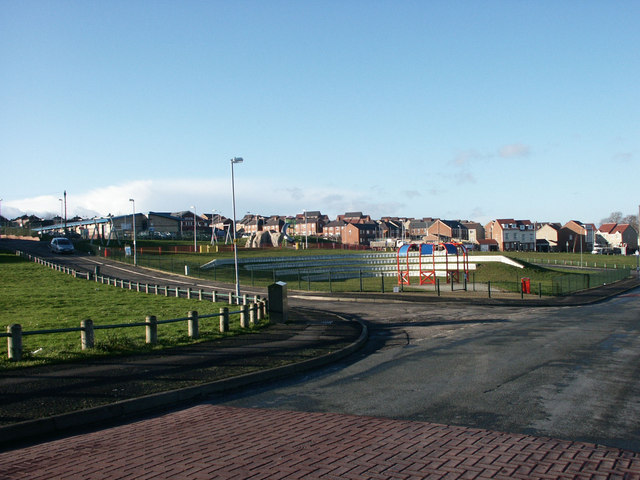
Centre of the Kendray estate with playground and amphitheatre

Kendray is an area in the S70 postal district of Barnsley, South Yorkshire, England that lies between Sheffield Road and Doncaster Road, both of which lead to and from Barnsley town centre. The area takes its name from Kendray Hospital which was named after the linen manufacturer, Francis Kendray. After the First World War building of council houses commenced and the Kendray estate was first established.

From 1983 to 1986 Kendray was one of four areas in South Yorkshire where the Probation Service ran a victim/offender mediation project (one of the first of its kind in the country).

Just under half of the old housing in Kendray has been demolished and replaced with fields, large recreational areas and modern housing. An amphitheatre and playground were built on one of the old sites, and new housing is being constructed on the other remaining sites. There are also plans to build a leisure centre nearby.

Recent regeneration has seen new housing replacing old and unusable housing, turning it into a more modern estate. Continued building is ongoing, as of 2008. Current amenities and services available include a play area in the centre, local shopping, a post office, medical centre, schooling for juniors and a football ground with numerous artificial pitches available.

Barnsley Academy is a secondary school in Kendray taking up to 900 pupils. The Forest Academy, previously called "Kendray Primary" up until 2013, is also located in Kendray.

Within two miles of Barnsley town centre and easy access to the Trans Pennine Trail and the M1 motorway, Kendray is becoming a popular location for the average family.

== Kendray Initiative ==
This was established to manage the neighbourhood by local residents, the Council and others in 1999.
