= Staincross =

Village in South Yorkshire, England

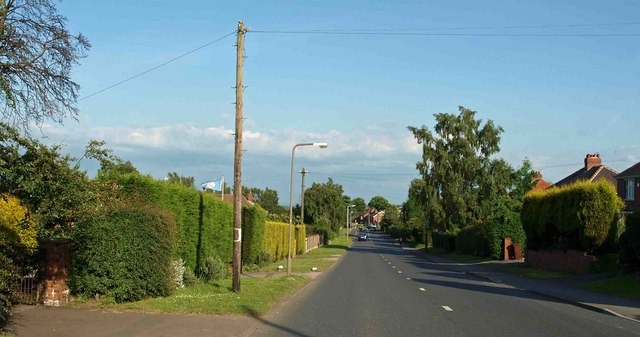
- Staincross Common

- Location within South Yorkshire
- Metropolitan borough: Barnsley
- Metropolitan county: South Yorkshire
- Region: Yorkshire and the Humber
- Country: England
- Sovereign state: United Kingdom
- Post town: BARNSLEY
- Postcode district: S75
- Dialling code: 01226
- Police: South Yorkshire
- Fire: South Yorkshire
- Ambulance: Yorkshire
- UK Parliament: Barnsley North

Staincross is a village in South Yorkshire, England, on the border with West Yorkshire. Historically part of the West Riding of Yorkshire, the population now falls within the Darton East ward of the Metropolitan Borough of Barnsley. The village also gave its name to the Staincross wapentake in the West Riding of Yorkshire. It is situated about 3 miles (4.8 km) from Barnsley, and 8 miles (13 km) from Wakefield.

== Geography ==
Staincross lies off the A61 road, about three miles north-west of Barnsley. It is located at approximately 53°35′27″N 1°30′0″W, and at an elevation of around 410 feet (125 m) above sea level. The section of the A61 between Staincross and Newmillerdam is rated in the top three most dangerous roads in Britain according to a survey conducted by The AA Motoring Trust.

== History ==
The name is believed to be derived from a Saxon stone cross ('stane cross') that until the 18th century occupied a position on the junction of Staincross Common - which in itself is an ancient trackway - and Greenside. The stone, now lost, may have been the remains of a rural shrine. Alternatively, those remains may have been from a typical wapentake meeting cross, now partially reconstructed in Cawthorne parish church grounds a short distance from Ailric's local power base.

== Postal recognition ==
After a prolonged campaign (backed by former Test cricket umpire, Dickie Bird, a resident of Staincross), a ballot was held in January 2003 to determine whether the residents of Staincross wanted their mail to include the name of the village. Before the ballot, Staincross mail bore the name of a neighbouring village, either Mapplewell or Darton. Indeed, it is unclear where the boundaries between the three villages lie. Villagers voted overwhelmingly in favour of the proposal by 966 to 199 and Royal Mail implemented changes to officially recognise the village.
