= Pogmoor =

Area of Barnsley in South Yorkshire, England

Coordinates: 53.55357°N 1.51448°W

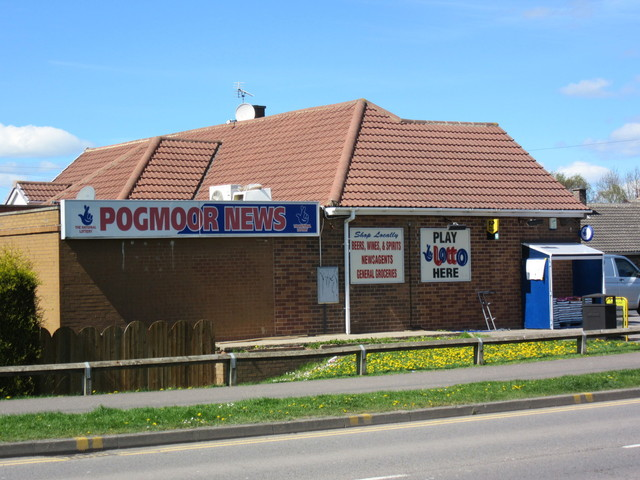

- Location within South Yorkshire
- OS grid reference: SE322064
- Metropolitan borough: Barnsley
- Metropolitan county: South Yorkshire
- Region: Yorkshire and the Humber
- Country: England
- Sovereign state: United Kingdom
- Post town: BARNSLEY
- Postcode district: S75
- Dialling code: 01226
- Police: South Yorkshire
- Fire: South Yorkshire
- Ambulance: Yorkshire
- UK Parliament: Penistone and Stocksbridge

Pogmoor is a residential suburb of Barnsley in South Yorkshire, England. It is located west of the town centre, just north of junction 37 of the M1 motorway.

As a centrally located suburb, situated close to the town centre, it is considered to be an affluent residential neighbourhood of Barnsley.

== Pogmoor Area Residents' Association ==
Pogmoor Area Residents' Association was formed on 14 June 2011, after a group of residents was successful in a campaign to stop a proposed planning application relating to land on West Road, Pogmoor.

They run occasional coffee mornings that are usually well-attended with around 20 to 50 people present. Every September, the Association holds an event to contribute to Macmillan's world's largest coffee morning, in which it raises hundreds of pounds for charity each time.

The Association undertakes environmental projects locally. The largest of these is the transformation of the field behind Cresswell Street into a park. Phase 1 of this was completed in 2012, when 34 mature trees were planted along the West Road boundary along with a wild flower meadow covering the mound that prevented vehicular access to the site. A bid is being submitted in November 2013 to fund phase 2, which will provide an avenue of 60 mature trees along the Royston Lead boundary plus a community orchard between the avenue and the allotments.

== Local parks ==
- Blackburn Lane - Located next to the junction of Pogmoor Road and Gawber Road, next to the top of Blackburn Lane. This park has a children's play area suitable for ages up to 11 years old.
- Penny Pie Park - Located next to the junction of Pogmoor Road and Dodworth Road (A628).
- Pogmoor Recreation Ground - Located off Pogmoor Road, and can be accessed via Glendale Close which leads to its car park and also by foot via St Owens Drive. This park has a free small car park and the park contains a football pitch, which is the home of local football team AFC Pogmoor.
- Sugdens Recreation Ground - Located off Stocks Lane and Winter Road. It has a car park which can be accessed via Stocks Lane, and can be also accessed by foot through Winter Road, Cresswell Street, and West Road. This park contains a car park, a multi-use games area (football, basketball, cricket), a bowling green, and a children's play area suitable for ages up to 11 years old.
