= 115th Brigade (United Kingdom) =

Military Unit

115th Brigade 115th Infantry Brigade
- World War II insignia
- Active: 10 December 1914–June 1919; September 1939–1945
- Country: United Kingdom
- Branch: British Army
- Type: Infantry
- Size: Brigade
- Part of: 38th (Welsh) Infantry Division
- Engagements: First World War; Second World War

Commanders
- Notable commanders: Brig-Gen Ivor Philipps, MP; John Minshull-Ford

The 115th Brigade was an infantry brigade of the British Army raised for 38th (Welsh) Division during both the First and Second World Wars.

== First World War ==
=== Original 115th Brigade ===
Alfred Leete's recruitment poster for Kitchener's Army.

On 6 August 1914, less than 48 hours after Britain's declaration of war, Parliament sanctioned an increase of 500,000 men for the Regular British Army. The newly appointed Secretary of State for War, Earl Kitchener of Khartoum, issued his famous call to arms: 'Your King and Country Need You', urging the first 100,000 volunteers to come forward. This group of six divisions with supporting arms became known as Kitchener's First New Army, or 'K1'. The K2, K3 and K4 battalions, brigades and divisions followed soon afterwards. The flood of volunteers overwhelmed the ability of the army to absorb and organise them, and by the time the Fifth New Army (K5) was authorised on 10 December 1914, many of the units were being formed by groups of men from particular localities or backgrounds who wished to serve together. Starting from London and Liverpool, the phenomenon of 'Pals battalions' quickly spread across the country, as local recruiting committees offered complete units to the War Office (WO). Thus 115th Brigade of 38th Division, formed on 10 December 1914, consisted of battalions raised in Northern England:

- 'Grimsby Chums', later 10th (Service) Battalion, Lincolnshire Regiment (Grimsby) – raised by the Mayor and Town of Grimsby on 9 September 1914
- 'Sheffield City Battalion', later 12th (Service) Battalion, York and Lancaster Regiment (Sheffield) – raised by the Lord Mayor and City of Sheffield on 5 September 1914
- '1st Barnsley Pals', later 13th (Service) Battalion, York and Lancaster Regiment (1st Barnsley) – raised by the Mayor and Town of Barnsley on 17 September 1914
- '2nd Barnsley Pals', later 14th (Service) Battalion, York and Lancaster Regiment (2nd Barnsley) – raised by the Mayor and Town of Barnsley on 30 November 1914

The battalions underwent their initial training close to their homes. Training for active service was held up for all the K5 units by the lack of equipment and instructors. On 10 April 1915 the WO decided to convert the K4 battalions into reserve units, to provide drafts for the K1–K3 battalions after they went overseas. The K4 divisions were broken up and the first six K5 divisions (37–42) and their constituent brigades were given the numbers of the disbanded K4 formations on 27 April 1915. 115th Brigade became 94th Brigade in 31st Division. The later K5 formations then took up the vacant numbers.

=== New 115th Brigade ===
One of the organisations recruiting for Kitchener's Army was the 'Welsh National Executive Committee' (WNEC). On 28 September 1914 David Lloyd George addressed a meeting of representatives from all over Wales, at which the committee was formed to seek permission to form a complete Welsh Army Corps of two divisions. The WO accepted the WNEC's proposal on 10 October and enrolment began. The 3rd Welsh Brigade, soon numbered the 130th, assembled at Colwyn Bay in North Wales on 10 December 1914 as part of the 1st Division, Welsh Army Corps (later 43rd (Welsh) Division) with the following battalions recruited from South Wales:

- 1st Gwent Battalion, later 10th (Service) Battalion, South Wales Borderers (1st Gwent), began recruiting on 12 November at Ebbw Vale and Cwm from among Monmouthshire coal miners and iron workers; joined 130th Bde at Colwyn Bay 30 December.
- 2nd Gwent Battalion, later 11th (Service) Battalion, South Wales Borderers (2nd Gwent) formed at the regimental depot of the South Wales Borderers at Brecon on 5 December, recruited from across Monmouthshire and Brecknockshire; joined 130th Bde at Colwyn Bay 9 January 1915.
- 3rd Gwent Battalion, later 12th (Service) Battalion, South Wales Borderers (3rd Gwent); a Bantam battalion formed at Newport, Wales in March 1915, it never joined the brigade and formally left in July to join the Welsh Bantam Brigade
- Cardiff City Battalion, later 16th (Service) Battalion, Welsh Regiment (Cardiff City), recruited by Cardiff City Council in November, and formed at Porthcawl, moving to join 130th Bde at Colwyn Bay on 31 December.

A political associate of Lloyd George, Ivor Philipps, MP for Southampton, was promoted to Brigadier-General to command the new brigade on 20 November. He was a retired Indian Army officer, and had been commanding officer of the Pembroke Yeomanry. On 19 January 1915 he was promoted again to Major-General to command the division. He was replaced by Colonel H.J. Evans, officer commanding No 4 District, Western Command, at Shrewsbury.

Following the conversion of the K4 divisions into reserve units, 43rd Division was redesignated 38th (Welsh) Division and 130th Bde as 115th Brigade on 29 April 1915. On 14 July 115th Bde was completed to its establishment of four battalions when 17th (Service) Battalion, Royal Welsh Fusiliers (2nd North Wales) joined from 113th Bde in place of the 12th SWB. This battalion had been formed at Llandudno on 2 February 1915 with its recruiting depot at Blaenau Ffestiniog in North Wales.

With units and brigades scattered across North Wales there was no opportunity for divisional training. However, in the summer the division began to concentrate around Winchester. It trained for open warfare on the Hampshire downland, leaving trench warfare to be learned when the troops reached the Western Front. It was not until November that enough rifles arrived for all the men to undertake their musketry course. 38th (W) Division was now warned for service on the Western Front. Advance parties began crossing o 21 November, and the division began leaving Winchester on 1 December and had crossed to Le Havre and travelled by train to Aire, where it concentrated on 6 December as part of XI Corps.

=== Service ===
At the end of the year the battalions sent parties up to the front line for instruction under experienced units of the Guards and 19th (Western) Divisions. In January 1916 38th (W) Division took over the Neuve-Chappelle sector of the line from 19th (W) Division, and from then until the beginning of June it was continually in the line, holding each sector of XI Corps' front in turn. The battalions were active in Trench raiding and took a steady trickle of casualties, especially in the dangerous Givenchy sector where mining and counter-mining was constant.

At this time 115th Bde was joined by its auxiliary units:

- 115th Brigade Machine Gun (MG) Company, Machine Gun Corps – disembarked at Le Havre 17 May 1916 and joined 19 May
- 115th Trench Mortar Battery (TMB) – formed within the brigade as 38/5 and 38/6 TMBs on 26 December 1915, redesignated as 115/A and 115/B on 24 January 1916 and as 115/1 and 115/2 on 16 March; combined into a single battery on 17 June; personnel seconded from the infantry battalions; equipped with 3-inch Stokes mortars

On 10 June 38th (W) Division was ordered south to the Somme sector, where that summer's 'Big Push' (the Battle of the Somme) was being prepared. It first went to a training area around Tincques and Villers-Brûlin, then at the end of the month it marched south and on 3 July it arrived at Buire-sur-l'Ancre in XVII Corps' reserve.

==== Mametz Wood ====
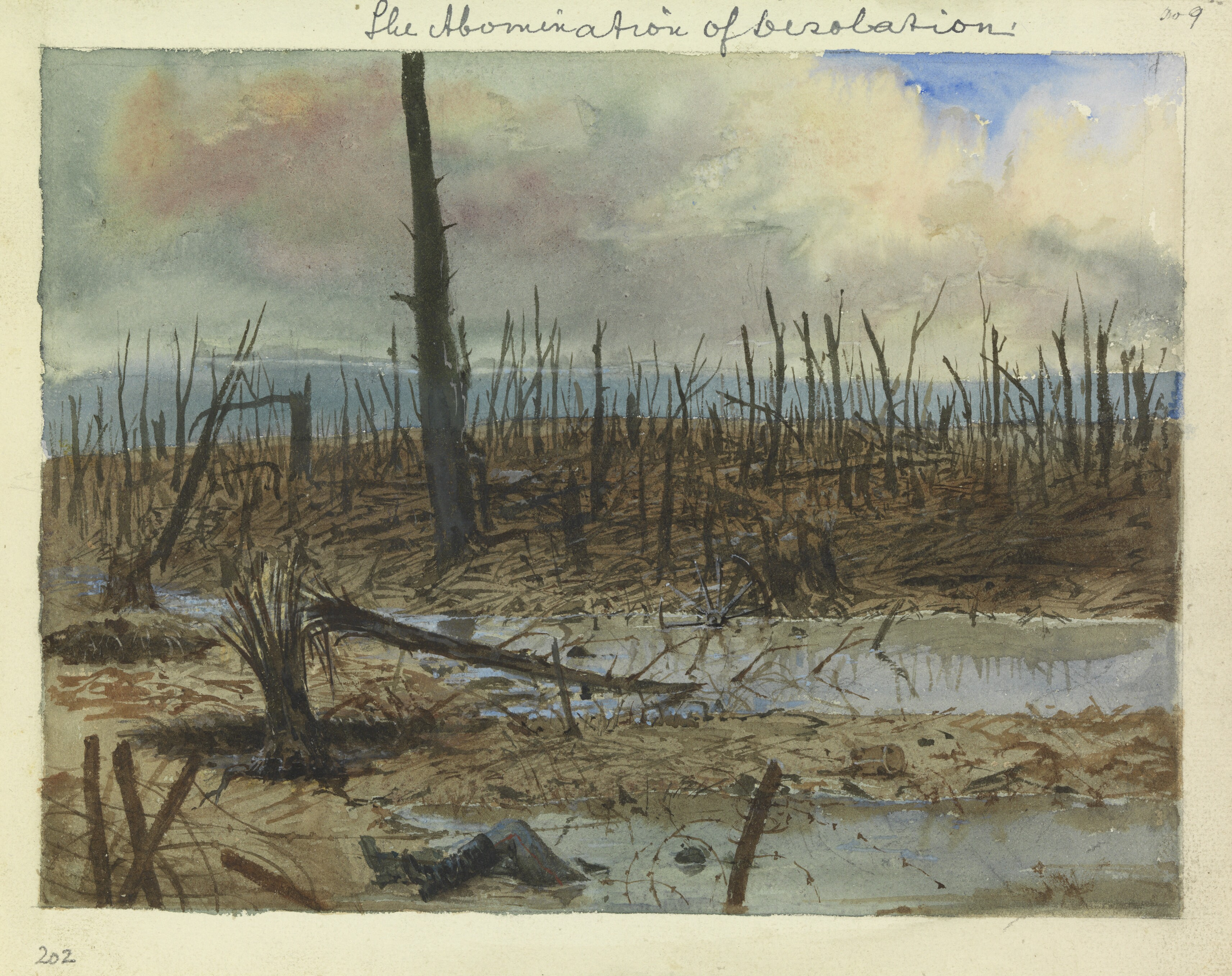
The Abomination of Desolation, sketch by J.B. Morrall of Mametz Wood after the 1916 fighting.

The Somme Offensive had begun on 1 July with a disastrous attack across a wide front. 38th (W) Division had been warned to accompany the cavalry in exploiting a breakthrough towards Bapaume. There was no breakthrough: instead the division was switched to the Mametz sector under XV Corps, where there had been some success. On 5 July it took over the front line and prepared to capture Mametz Wood. The initial attack on the south-east corner, the 'Hammerhead', was assigned to 115th Bde. Brigadier-Gen Evans reconnoitred the position and decided to avoid the ridge overlooking the ground, instead attacking on a front of one battalion up the more sheltered valley alongside Caterpillar Wood, with a second battalion following, another in support in Caterpillar Wood, and the fourth in reserve. However, he was overruled, and had to attack on a two-battalion front; the revised orders only went out at 02.00 on 7 July, for an attack that morning. The new dispositions had 11th SWB on the left starting from Caterpillar Wood and Marlborough Copse and 16th Welsh on the right from the ridge above the valley. A French artillery groupe bombarded Mametz Wood with gas shell at 05.30, followed by the main British artillery bombardment at 08.00. The infantry advanced at 08.30. It was too windy to fire a smokescreen, but the brigade machine guns and trench mortars supported the movement. However, the troops ran into machine gun fire not only from the Hammerhead in front, but also in enfilade from two small woods, Flatiron Copse and Sabot Copse, further up the valley to the right, which should have been screened by smoke. At 08.45 Evans sent forward a staff officer to report on the situation, and by 10.10 had received reports that the whole attack was held up 200–400 yards (180–370 m) short of the objectives. Evans called for artillery support for a renewed attack while machine guns were pushed up into Caterpillar Wood in an effort to counteract the enemy rifles and machine guns. XV Corps organised a bombardment of the eastern edge of Mametz Wood by heavy artillery from 10.45 to 11.15, but some of these shells fell short on 115th Bde's forward positions. Evans defied instructions from Corps HQ and added two companies from 10th SWB to strengthen his two leading battalions. However the renewed attack at 11.15 made slow progress in heavy rain and made no additional gains. Divisional HQ ordered Evans to make a further attack at 17.00 after a half-hour bombardment, and Evans accompanied by his staff officer Captain Wyn Griffith went down to Caterpillar Wood to reorganise his troops, MGs and TMB. However, this was only partially completed by 17.15 and Evans used an artillery observer's telephone to contact HQ for a postponement; this was finally granted at 18.45. Evans was disgusted with the pressure from Corps HQ, commenting to Griffith, 'You mark my words, they'll send me home for this: they want butchers not brigadiers'. 115th Brigade was eventually ordered to withdraw to bivouacs, the three attacking battalions having suffered over 400 casualties, while two companies of 17th RWF held the line during the night.

Early on 10 July Mametz Wood was attacked with the full weight of 38th (W) Division, 113th and 114th Bdes leading, with 115th Bde in reserve. The attack made progress into the wood from the south, but bogged down in the Hammerhead, where the Germans counter-attacked. 10th SWB and 17th RWF from 115th Bde were then committed to the fighting, and by the end of the day the southern half of Mametz Wood was in the division's hands, with 10th SWB holding most of the Hammerhead. During the night 115th Bde took over control of the fighting and two companies of 11th SWB were brought into the line between 17th RWF and 10th SWB (the other two remaining to hold Caterpillar Wood and Marlborough Copse). Evans made a personal reconnaissance of the wood, accompanied by Lt-Col Gaussen and a party of bayonet men from 11th SWB. They got lost and were at the northern end of the wood close to the Germans when the British artillery opened up, wounding Evans and his Brigade major, Capt C.L. Veal, and killing 8 of 11 bayonet men. Evans called up Capt Griffith to take over as brigade major and continued his reconnaissance, reporting to Divisional HQ that the position was still unstable. He set about strengthening and consolidating the front line. At 11.40 next morning he was ordered to make a new attack to take the rest of the wood. Deciding that he could not organise a formal attack with artillery support, he decided to launch a surprise attack at 15.00 with the bayonet. Just 15 minutes before the attack, an unexpected British artillery barrage on the north of the wood caused numerous casualties and disorganisation among the troops waiting to attack, and was followed by a German counter-barrage. The attack was finally made at 15.30 after the artillery stopped. Two companies of 11th SWB went forward, leaving the other two in the Hammerhead, but progress through the fallen trees and undergrowth was very slow. Brigadier-Gen Evans was wounded again and on his own initiative, Lt-Col Gaussen collected detachments of 10th SWB (who had lost their CO) to reinforce his battalion. Eventually 11th SWB fought its way through to the north edge of Mametz Wood and began to dig in about 75 yards (69 m) from the German trench. However, 17th RWF and 16th Welsh further left could not quite reach the edge of the wood, leaving 11th SWB's flank exposed, and under constant bombardment the exhausted battalion withdrew into the interior of the wood. 38th (W) Division was relieved that night.

Two days after being relieved, 115th Bde was back in the line in the Somme sector, albeit at Hébuterne where the fighting had died down after 1 July. At the end of July 38th (W) Division moved to the Ypres Salient, where it held trenches facing Pilckem Ridge, spending the time improving the trenches and carrying out raids. Despite his wounds, Evans remained in command of 115th Bde; however, as he had predicted he was removed in August, apparently on the grounds of age and his 'challenging nature'. He was replaced on 30 August by Brig-Gen Carlos Joseph Hickie, promoted from commanding 14th (Service) Bn, Hampshire Regiment in 39th Division. In March 1917 Hickie was succeeded by Brig-Gen John Minshull-Ford, a Royal Welsh Fusilier, who was wounded on 3 June; there was then a succession of temporary brigade commanders until Brig-Gen G. Gwyn-Thomas took over on 20 July. Gwyn-Thomas was a former officer of the 2nd Lancers (Gardner's Horse) of the Indian Army, and had been commanding the 26th Royal Fusiliers in 41st Division.

==== Pilckem Ridge ====
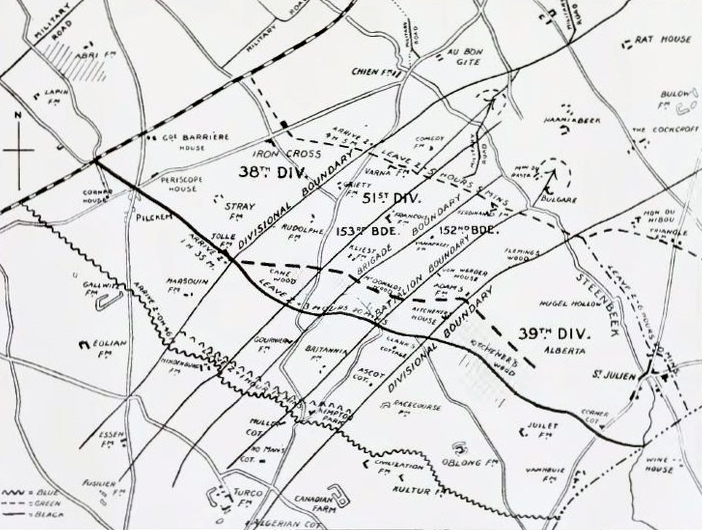
38th (W) Division's attack at Pilckem Ridge, 31 July 1917.

In May 1917 38th (W) Division was warned that the British would launch an offensive on the division 's front during the summer, and it began preparations, including digging assembly trenches and even a new front line trench 300 yards (270 m) closer to the enemy. The Germans seem to have regarded this as a feint, and took little notice. That month the division was given its role in the forthcoming operation, and towards the end of June was taken out of the line and went to the St Hilaire area to train for the attack over replica trenches and strongpoints. On 16 July the return march to the front began, and by 20 July 38th (W) Division was back in the line. The battalions were constantly called on for working parties to complete preparations for the much-delayed Ypres Offensive, and German artillery was active over both the front and rear areas attempting to disrupt the preparations with high explosive and the new Mustard gas.

The opening of the offensive was finally fixed for 31 July. For 38th (W) Division the plan was for 113th and 114th Bdes to advance up the ridge and capture the first three objectives (the Blue, Black and Green Lines), including the fortified Pilckem village and the pillbox at 'Iron Cross' crossroads. Then two battalions of 115th Bde (11th SWB and 17th RWF) were to pass through and descend from Iron Cross Ridge to capture the line of the Steenbeek stream (the 'Green Dotted Line'). As the attack progressed, 11th SWB and 17th RWF slowly worked their way up to Iron Cross Ridge and then launched their own attack, which was successful despite the numbers of concrete machine gun posts hidden in the houses. They reached the Steenbeek and parties passed over to hold the crossings. Casualties had been heavy, however, and Brig-Gen Gwyn-Thomas ordered up a company of 10th SWB to reinforce 11th SWB and one of 16th Welsh to reinforce 17th RWF. About 14.00 the Germans were seen massing for a counter-attack, which developed at 15.10, driving a company of 11th SWB out of 'Au Bon Gîte' and forcing it to retire to the west bank of the Steenbeek. The rest of the line held firm, assisted by an artillery and machine gun barrage, rifle fire wiping out those Germans who made it through the barrage. During the afternoon steady rain began to fall, rendering the ground muddy and slippery, which hindered movement. Next day 11th SWB was ordered to recapture the bridgehead over the Steenbeek at Au Bon Gîte, but the acting CO was killed carrying out the reconnaissance and the brigade major (Capt M.H. King) who accompanied him decided that 11th SWB was too weak to make the attempt and cancelled the orders. The rest of 10th SWB was therefore sent forward with additional ammunition to strengthen the line, but although the Germans shelled the battalions heavily, their attempted counter-attack failed in the mud and barrage. The men of 115th Bde withdrew 200 yards (180 m) to shelter from the bombardment in shellholes, but reoccupied the line along the Steenbeek afterwards. 115th Brigade was relieved by 113th Bde from the front line on the night of 1/2 August, though it took until 4 August to gather the scattered survivors of 11th SWB along the Steenbeek. The whole division went back to Proven on 6 August, where it got two weeks rest.

38th (W) Division returned to the line later in August after the Battle of Langemarck. 115th Brigade was in reserve, between Pilckem and the Yser Canal, working on defences and road repair under harassing shellfire and bombing. 16th Welsh attempted to capture 'Eagle Trench' on 27 August, but in the mud they were unable to keep up with the barrage and were hit by enfilade fire from the 'White House' strongpoint. Nevertheless, a platoon of 11th SWB, sent up to maintain contact, managed to capture White House. 11th SWB came under heavy shellfire and had to be reinforced by 10th SWB, but together they held on to White House, the only success of the day. 10th SWB maintained its position until it was relieved and went into reserve. 38th (W) Division conducted no further operations and after it was relieved on 11 September it left the Ypres Salient and moved south to the Armentières sector.

==== Winter 1917–18 ====
Although Armentières and the Lys Valley was considered a quiet sector, the division had a wide front to hold with weak battalions (companies were reduced to two platoons each). Much of the time was spent trying to drain and improve the chain of defensive positions in the low-lying and waterlogged country, which were mainly breastworks rather than trenches. The Germans in this sector were energetic raiders. On 19 September, soon after it had taken over the sector, one of 10th SWB's detached posts was raided by a large number of Germans, but the raiders were held off and then caught by the British counter-barrage. 10th SWB launched its own big raid against 'Incandescent Trench' on the night of 7/8 November. During the winter 38th (W) Division helped to train troops of the 1st Portuguese Division. Then in mid-January 1918 38th (W) Division was withdrawn for an extended rest.

By early 1918 the BEF was suffering a manpower crisis. Brigades had to be reduced from four to three battalions, and the surplus war-formed battalions were broken up to provide reinforcements for others. On 6–7 February 115th Bde lost both 11th SWB and 16th Welsh, which were drafted (10th SWB received 150 men from 11th SWB) and the remainder sent to 1st Entrenching Battalion. The brigade gained 2nd RWF from 33rd Division to bring it up to the new three-battalion establishment. On 2 March the brigades lost their MG companies, which were combined into a divisional MG battalion. For the rest of the war, 115th Bde had the following order of battle:

- 2nd RWF
- 17th RWF
- 10th SWB
- 115th TMB

==== German Spring Offensive ====
The long-anticipated German spring offensive opened on 21 March 1918 against Third and Fifth Armies. 38th (W) Division had returned to the line in the Wez Macquart sector south of Armentières in mid-February, but this sector under First Army was not affected, though enemy shelling grew heavier. On 29 March the division was rushed south to the Albert area to reinforce Third Army, arriving on 2 April (on which date Brig-Gen Gwyn-Thomas was evacuated, sick). Next day it moved up to support two divisions that had been badly hit in the fighting and were now holding an extemporised line along the River Ancre. 115th Brigade went to Hédauville in close support, but also to work on fresh defences. The line in front of Albert held firm, and 115th Bde was not engaged during the Battle of the Ancre on 5 April. The German offensive now ended on this front. The division took over the line on the night of 11/12 April, occupying a jumble of hastily dug trenches. 113th Brigade carried out an operation on 22 April to improve the position around Aveluy Wood, and 115th Bde took over the captured trenches on the high ground on 25/26 April. It remained in this position during May. On 9 May the enemy made a determined attack to recover the high ground, pushing the neighbouring Australians back for a while. The division was relieved on 20 May.

While out of the line the division underwent intensive training, particularly in shooting, but battalions had to take turns to work on defences. It then returned to the Aveluy Wood sector until 19 July, carrying out active patrolling and raids to ensure complete control of No man's land. 318th US Infantry Regiment was attached to the division at this time for their introduction to trench warfare. The division spent another period out of the line, returning to Aveluy on 5 August.

==== Albert & Bapaume ====
115th Brigade arrived at Aveluy having practised for a planned attack, but the attack was called off after Fourth Army launched the Allied Hundred Days Offensive with the Battle of Amiens on 8 August, causing the Germans to retire along the Ancre on Third Army's front. Third Army immediately began planning its own offensive. This began with the Battle of Albert on 21 August. V Corps gave 38th (W) Division the task of crossing the flooded Ancre: 113th Brigade at Albert, 114th Bde at Hamel, a few miles north, and then they were to converge towards Pozières. 115th Brigade was to support the 113th Bde and later deal with the triangle of ground between the other two brigades. 113th and 114th Brigades slipped troops across the river on the nights of 21/22 and 22/23 August and launched their preliminary attack at 04.45 on 23 August. That morning 115th Bde got parties across the river at Aveluy, where a bridge was built by 151st Field Company, Royal Engineers. The attack was then launched at 01.00 next morning. 17th RWF led 115th Bde, with 10th SWB following to 'mop up' behind them, securing large numbers of prisoners. A trench in front of Ovillers held 17th SWB up and 10th SWB was sent left to deal with it, but was itself stopped by fire from a northern continuation of the same trench. The division had achieved all its targets except Ovillers, and at 16.00 it was ordered to resume its advance, with 115th Bde skirting past Ovillers along the nigher ground to the north. This began at 17.30 and progress was slow, but the turning movement caused the enemy to abandon Ovillers; by 22.00 the ruins were clear of them. The pursuit began at 02.30 next morning, the troops moving by compass bearing over the broken countryside in the dark. 115th Bde met little opposition in quickly occupying its objectives between Mametz Wood and Bazentin-le-Petit. In the late evening of 25 August the enemy made an unsuccessful counter-attack on 10th SWB in Bazentin-le-Petit.

The continuation of the operation next day (26 August) formed part of the Second Battle of Bapaume. 115th Brigade pushed along the valley south of High Wood, enveloping the enemy there and capturing 15 machine guns and 40 prisoners who had not retreated in time. At 04.00 next morning 114th Bde passed through 115th's positions and gained some more ground before holding off fierce counter-attacks from the enemy's strong position in Delville Wood. After a day's bombardment of this position, 38th (W) Division attacked on 29 August, 115th Bde passing through 114th and advancing by the north of Delville Wood. In the evening 10th SWB captured Lesbœufs. Heavy fighting continued next day, with the troops of 115th Bde in reserve north of Delville Wood, under continuous shellfire. The enemy positions were bombarded on 31 August and next day the division attacked once more. 114th Brigade was launched to take Morval, and then 115th Bde was to pass through to capture Sailly-Saillisel. 114th Brigade achieved its objective after a desperate fight, and 115th Bde began its advance. However, the enemy held some commanding ground in the gap between 38th and the neighbouring 17th (Northern) Division; enfilade fire from this position caused heavy casualties to 115th Bde and two companies of 10th SWB had to be turned aside to deal with it. They successfully attacked the position, capturing prisoners and machine guns and getting in touch with 17th (N) Division. 113th Brigade completed the capture of Sailly-Saillisel. This success meant that on 2 September 115th Bde could form up in the ground between Morval and Sailly-Saillisel unseen by the enemy. It attacked through 113th Bde, but the latter was so mixed up with the enemy that the Creeping barrage could not be brought down close enough and the attack failed. However, the enemy withdrew during the night and at daybreak on 3 September 113th and 115th Bdes occupied an old German trench system. In two weeks' fighting, V Corps had now cleared much of the old Somme battlefield that had been fought over for months in 1916, and it was now closing up to the Canal du Nord. Although all the bridges had been destroyed, 38th (W) Division had established a small bridgehead over the canal before it was relieved on 5 September.

==== Hindenburg Line ====
38th (W) Division went back into the line on 11 September. 115th Brigade held the front line, which was in a support trench of the British trenches dug in 1917 facing the Hindenburg Line. Although no advance was made for a week, the enemy made repeated attempts to drive the division back, the front trench being subjected to continuous artillery fire. After this, 115th Brigade withdrew into divisional reserve for the attack on 18 September (the Battle of Épehy). This attack was only partially successful; the division was relieved on 20/21 September.

The Allies launched a concerted series of offensives all along the Western Front at the end of September, including Fourth Army's crossing of the St Quentin Canal on 28 September. For this operation 38th (W) Division was brought forward and occupied old trenches at 2 hours' notice to join in the attacks. By 3 October Fourth Army had made such good progress that the division had to change position to remain in supporting distance. This entailed a flank march over open ground, part of which was under enemy observation and under continuous bombardment with high explosive and mustard gas. However, on 4 October 115th Bde reached Bony and that night it carried out a complex relief of 50th (Northumbrian) Division. The Germans had fallen back to the Beaurevoir Line, which was strongly entrenched and wired. The division spent two days bringing up artillery and pushing forward to gain a good 'jumping off line' from which to assault the Beaurevoir Line. The plan for the attack on 8 October (part of the Second Battle of Cambrai) called on 38th (W) Division to make an advance of over 5,000 yards (4,600 m) through very strong positions. It began at 01.00 with 10th SWB and 17th RWF advancing behind a barrage south and north respectively of the village of Villers-Outréaux; 2nd RWF with two tanks would then mop up the village at daybreak. 10th SWB's attack ran into unseen wire and machine gun fire and was held up. The battalion had to regroup before it could make a second attempt. By dawn 10th SWB and 17th RWF were reorganised, and 2nd RWF had arrived with the tanks and an artillery observer. The renewed attack broke into the line and began rolling it up, so that at 11.30 114th Bde could pass through to take up the attack. The enemy broke, and 38th (W) Division reached its objectives. While 113th and 114th Bdes held the new front line and support positions, 115th Bde went into billets in the largely undamaged village of Villers-Outréaux – the first habitable buildings the troops had seen since 4 August.

==== Selle & Sambre ====
Over the next few days 38th (W) Division followed and supported 33rd Division's advance. 115th Brigade relieved 33rd Division on the night of 13/14 October, facing the enemy across the River Selle. Several days were then spent preparing for an assault crossing (the Battle of the Selle). 38th (W) Division made its attack with 113th and 114th Bdes on the night of 19/20 October and 33rd Division took up the pursuit thereafter. On 26 October 38th (W) Division returned to the front line at Englefontaine, facing the Forest of Mormal. On 4 November 115th Bde attacked as part of the larger Battle of the Sambre. The brigade had to advance on a wide frontage (2,000 yards (1,800 m)) through strongly-fenced orchards and then the trees of the forest. At Zero (06.15) there was a dense fog. Strong wire-cutters were supplied to cut through the wired hedges, but tanks broke most of these down, though they did not enter the forest. The attack was made in lines of small columns, each led by an officer with a compass, and these columns were often able to move between the enemy machine gun posts and mop them up from behind. After 115th Bde had penetrated into the forest, the advance was taken up by the other brigades in turn. By next morning the division had advanced 4 miles (6.4 km) further than its neighbours, and had already overrun the first objective for 5 November. That day 38th (W) Division remained on the captured positions while 33rd Division passed through and crossed the River Sambre. 38th (W) Division was ordered to take over the pursuit from 33rd Division on 7 November; the brigades had to struggle over the Sambre by a single bridge and catch the fast-moving 33rd. That night 113th Bde passed through 33rd Division, taking over the lead while the others followed until the morning of 11 November when the Armistice with Germany came into force, ending hostilities.

==== Post-Armistice ====
38th (W) Division concentrated round Aulnoye, where demobilisation began in December, with critical workers (many miners in the case of 38th (W) Division) being released first. The division began withdrawing from the Aulnoye area on 27 December and by 14 January 1919 it had settled into billets to the east of Amiens. Demobilisation continued, and more recently enlisted men were drafted to the Army of Occupation on the Rhine. 38th (W) Division was disbanded in June, with individual units being reduced to reduced to cadre strength in France, later to be disbanded in the UK.

=== Insignia ===
38th (Welsh) Division's red dragon formation sign.

115th Brigade battle patches: left to right, top row: 17th RWF, 10th, 11th SWB and 16th Welsh; bottom row: 115th MG Co and 115th TMB.

38th (Welsh) Division adopted a scheme of coloured cloth geometric shapes worn on the upper arms to distinguish its brigades and units. 115th Brigade used a square or upright rectangle, which in the case of the SWB battalions had a stylised tower embroidered on it:

- 17th RWF: pink square
- 10th SWB: dark green rectangle with red tower
- 11th SWB: dark blue rectangle with light blue tower
- 16th Welsh: dark red square
- 115th MG Co: black square
- 115th TMB: mid-blue square

After 38th (W) Division adopted the Red Dragon of Wales on a black cloth rectangle as a divisional sign during 1917, this was worn on the right arm and the brigade/battalion flash was worn on the left arm only.

=== Commanders ===
The following officers commanded 115th Bde during World War I:

- Brig-Gen Ivor Philipps, MP, 20 November 1914, promoted to command 38th (Welsh) Division 19 January 1915
- Brig-Gen H.J. Evans, 13 February 1915
- Brig-Gen Carlos Joseph Hickie, 30 August 1916, transferred to command 224th Mixed Bde March 1917
- Lt-Col F.W. Smith (16th Welsh), acting 7–9 March and 14–19 July 1917
- Brig-Gen John Minshull-Ford, 9 March 1917, wounded 3 June 1917
- Lt-Col J.H. Hayes, acting 4–9 June and 19–20 July 1917
- Brig-Gen T.G. Cope, 9 June 1917, sick 14 July 1917
- Brig-Gen G. Gwyn-Thomas, 20 July 1917, sick 2 April 1918
- Lt-Col J.B. Cockburn (17th RWF), acting 2–6 and 7–16 April 1918
- Brig-Gen Adrian Carton de Wiart, VC, temporary, 6 April 1918, transferred to command 105th Bde, 35th Division, 7 April 1918
- Brig-Gen W.B. Hulke, 16 April 1918, wounded 30 August 1918
- Lt-Col C.C. Norman (17th RWF), acting 30 August–5 September 1918
- Brig-Gen Hugo de Pree, 5 September 1918

The following served as Brigade major:

- Capt C.L. Veal, December 1915, wounded 11 July 1916
- Capt L.W. Griffith, acting 11 July 1916
- Maj A. Derry, July 1916
- Maj V.C. Bawdon, March 1917
- Capt M.H. King, July 1917
- Capt A.V. Wright, August 1918

== Second World War ==
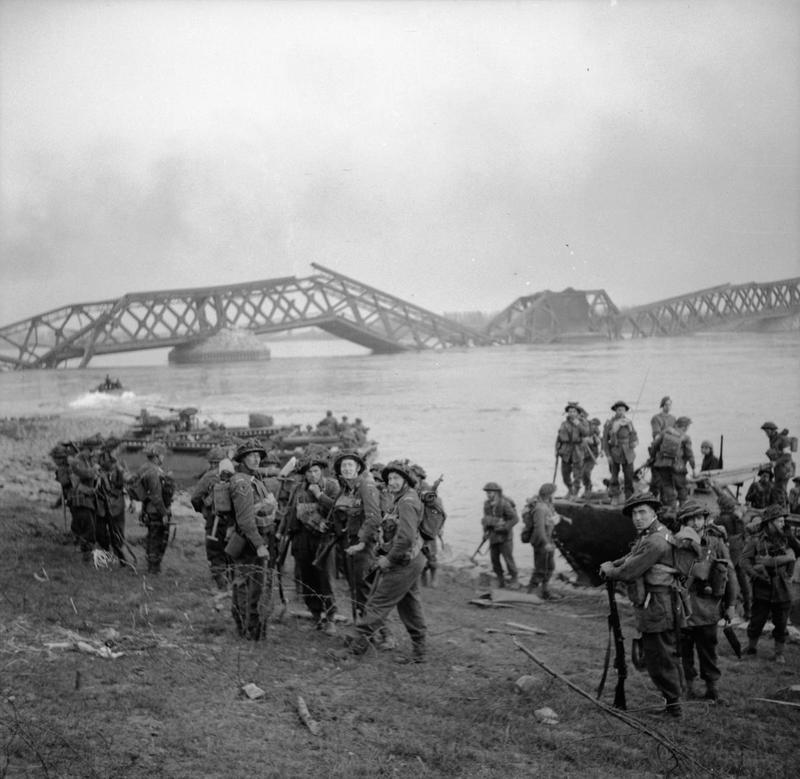
Men of the 1st Battalion, Cheshire Regiment crossing the Rhine in Buffaloes at Wesel, Germany, 24 March 1945.

Disbanded after the war the brigade number was reactivated in the Territorial Army (TA), the British Army's part-time reserve, as the 115th Infantry Brigade shortly before the start of the Second World War, this time composed of three TA battalions of the Royal Welch Fusiliers, the 8th, 9th and 10th. The brigade spent most of the war in the United Kingdom as part of the 38th (Welsh) Infantry Division. From 2 August 1944, it formed Force 135 which was planning the reoccupation of the Channel Islands. In the event, the plan did not go ahead, and the brigade left Force 135 on 30 January 1945. On 12 February, it moved to North West Europe where it remained until the end of the war, serving variously under the direct command of VIII, XII and I Corps.

=== Order of battle ===
The 115th Infantry Brigade was constituted as follows during the war:

- 8th (Denbighshire) Battalion, Royal Welch Fusiliers (to 4 July 1944)
- 9th (Caernarvonshire and Anglesey) Battalion, Royal Welch Fusiliers (to 11 October 1943)
- 10th (Merionethshire and Montgomeryshire) Battalion, Royal Welch Fusiliers (to 25 July 1942, became 6th (Royal Welch) Battalion, Parachute Regiment)
- 115th Infantry Brigade Anti-Tank Company (formed 1 January 1940, disbanded 12 January 1943)
- 13th Battalion, Royal Welch Fusiliers (from 7 November 1942 to 4 July 1944)
- 9th Battalion, Somerset Light Infantry (from 24 October 1943 to 4 July 1944)
- 1st Battalion, Cheshire Regiment (from 28 August 1944 to 3 April 1945)
- 4th Battalion, Northamptonshire Regiment (from 28 August 1944)
- 30th Battalion, Royal Berkshire Regiment (from 27 August 1944 to 15 March 1945)
- 5th (Hackney) Battalion, Royal Berkshire Regiment (from 1 April 1945)
- 3rd Battalion, Monmouthshire Regiment (from 8 April 1945)

== Bibliography ==
- C.T. Atkinson, The History of the South Wales Borderers 1914–1918, London: Medici Society, 1931.
- Maj A.F. Becke, History of the Great War: Order of Battle of Divisions, Part 3a: New Army Divisions (9–26), London: HM Stationery Office, 1938/Uckfield: Naval & Military Press, 2007, ISBN 1-847347-41-X.
- Maj A.F. Becke, History of the Great War: Order of Battle of Divisions, Part 3b: New Army Divisions (30–41) and 63rd (R.N.) Division, London: HM Stationery Office, 1939/Uckfield: Naval & Military Press, 2007, ISBN 1-847347-41-X.
- Brig-Gen Sir James E. Edmonds, History of the Great War: Military Operations, France and Belgium 1916, Vol II, Appendices, London:Macmillan, 1938/Uckfield: Naval & Military Press, 2021, ISBN 978-1-78331-626-7.
- Brig-Gen Sir James E. Edmonds, History of the Great War: Military Operations, France and Belgium 1918, Vol IV, 8th August–26th September: The Franco-British Offensive, London: Macmillan, 1939/Uckfield: Imperial War Museum and Naval & Military, 2009, ISBN 978-1-845747-28-2.
- Brig-Gen Sir James E. Edmonds & Lt-Col R. Maxwell-Hyslop, History of the Great War: Military Operations, France and Belgium 1918, Vol V, 26th September–11th November, The Advance to Victory, London: HM Stationery Office,
- Clive Elderton & Gary Gibbs, World War One British Army Corps and Divisional Signs, Wokingham: Military History Society, 2018.
- Gen Sir Martin Farndale, History of the Royal Regiment of Artillery: Western Front 1914–18, Woolwich: Royal Artillery Institution, 1986, ISBN 1-870114-00-0.
- Mike Hibberd, Infantry Divisions, Identification Schemes 1917, Wokingham: Military History Society, 2016.
- Brig E.A. James, British Regiments 1914–18, London: Samson Books, 1978, ISBN 0-906304-03-2/Uckfield: Naval & Military Press, 2001, ISBN 978-1-84342-197-9.
- Lt-Col H.F. Joslen, Orders of Battle, United Kingdom and Colonial Formations and Units in the Second World War, 1939–1945, London: HM Stationery Office, 1960/London: London Stamp Exchange, 1990, ISBN 0-948130-03-2/Uckfield: Naval & Military Press, 2003, ISBN 1-843424-74-6.
- Capt Wilfred Miles, History of the Great War: Military Operations, France and Belgium 1916, Vol II, 2nd July 1916 to the End of the Battles of the Somme, London: Macmillan, 1938/Imperial War Museum & Battery Press, 1992, ISBN 0-89839-169-5/Uckfield: Naval & Military Press, 2005, ISBN 978-1-84574-721-3.
- Lt-Col J.E. Munby (ed.), A History of the 38th (Welsh) Division, London: Hugh Rees, 1920/Uckfield: Naval & Military Press, 2007, ISBN 978-1-84342-583-0.
- Michael Renshaw, Battleground Somme: Welsh on the Somme: Mametz Wood, 2nd Edn, Barnsley: Pen & Sword, 2015, ISBN 978-1-47383-269-5.
- Instructions Issued by The War Office During August, 1914, London: HM Stationery Office, 1916.
- Instructions Issued by The War Office During April, 1915, London: HM Stationery Office.
- Instructions Issued by The War Office During September, 1915, London: HM Stationery Office.

=== External sources ===
- Chris Baker, The Long, Long Trail
- Imperial War Museum, Lives of the First World War
