= St Mary's Church, Barnsley =

Anglican church in Barnsley, South Yorkshire, England

St Mary's Church
- Parish Church of St Mary the Virgin, Barnsley
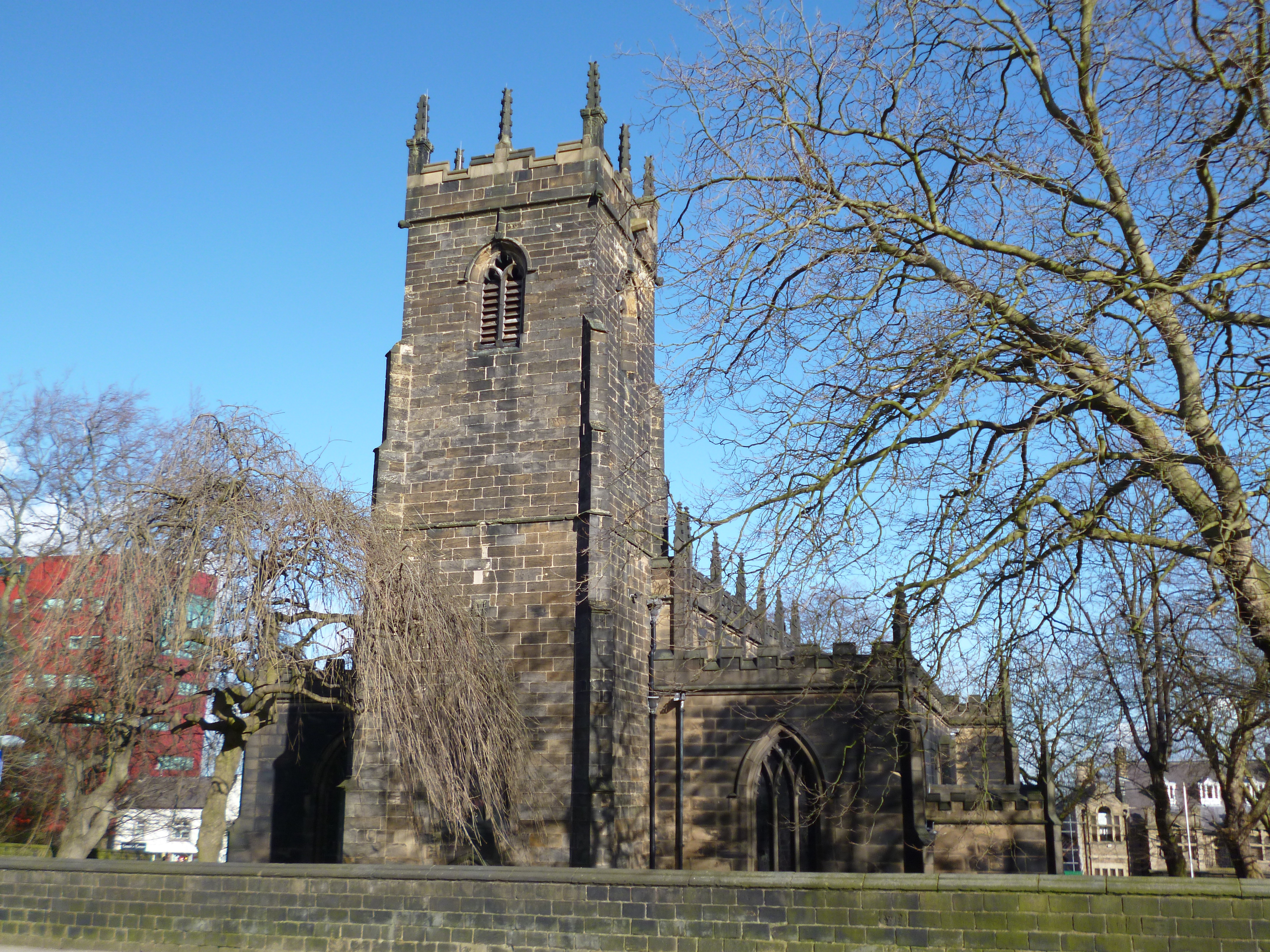
- St Mary's Church
- 53.555383°N 1.483458°W
- OS grid reference: SE 34356 06656
- Location: Barnsley, Barnsley
- Country: England
- Denomination: Anglican
- Website: barnsleyparish.weebly.com

History
- Status: Parish church

Architecture
- Functional status: Active
- Heritage designation: Grade II*
- Style: Gothic revival

Administration
- Province: York
- Diocese: Leeds
- Archdeaconry: Leeds
- Deanery: Leeds
- Parish: Barnsley

St Mary's Church is an active parish church in the town of Barnsley, within the Metropolitan Borough of Barnsley, South Yorkshire, England. Built in the year 1400, the church is located on Church Lane and is directly next to the college and town hall. The church is used for hosting religious services and Barnsley College uses it for music performances and events. It is a Grade II* listed building.
