= Listed buildings in Barnsley (Old Town Ward) =

Old Town ward is a ward in the metropolitan borough of Barnsley, South Yorkshire, England. The ward contains three listed buildings that are recorded in the National Heritage List for England. All the listed buildings are designated at Grade II, the lowest of the three grades, which is applied to "buildings of national importance and special interest". The ward is to the northwest of the centre of the town of Barnsley. The listed buildings all date from the 20th century, and consist of a large house later used for other purposes, a former school, and a church.

== Buildings ==
| Name and location | Photograph | Date | Notes |
|---|---|---|---|
| Moorland Court; 53.55818°N 1.49198°W | — | 1905–06 | A large house later used for other purposes, it is in painted and rendered brick, with sandstone dressings and orange tiled roofs. There are two storeys and an irregular plan. The main entrance has a segmental-arched doorway with three keystones and a segmental hood. Most of the windows are casements, some are mullioned, there are circular windows, bay windows, and hipped dormers. In the garden front is a recess with a terrace under a verandah. |
| Former Barnsley Sixth Form College; 53.56313°N 1.49016°W | | 1909 | The school, which was designed by Buckland and Haywood-Farmer, was converted into flats in 2005–06. It is in red brick with stone dressings, a coped parapet, and a hipped roof of Westmorland slate. There are two storeys and a central block of seven bays linked by three recessed narrow bays to a three-bay block on each side, beyond are two-storey wings. In the middle of the centre block, steps lead up to a portal that has a doorway with a fanlight, pilaster jambs with voluted capitals, and an open segmental pediment. The windows are sashes with architraves and aprons, and in the top floor also with triangular pediments. In the centre of the roof is a wooden lantern with round-arched openings, triangular pediments, and a domed roof. |
| St Paul's Church; 53.56071°N 1.49597°W | | 1936 | The church is in yellow and orange brick, with concrete dressings, flat concrete roofs, and a copper domed roof. It consists of a square nave, a lower rectangular chancel, and a semicircular sanctuary even lower. On the south is an arcaded porch, and around the east end are a chapel, an ambulatory, and a vestry. The windows are narrow, square-headed in the sanctuary, round-headed elsewhere, and on the north and south front of the nave they are stepped. |

== See also ==
- Listed buildings in Barnsley
