= Listed buildings in Barnsley (Central Ward) =

Central ward is a ward in the metropolitan borough of Barnsley, South Yorkshire, England. The ward contains 48 listed buildings that are recorded in the National Heritage List for England. Of these, three are listed at Grade II*, the middle of the three grades, and the others are at Grade II, the lowest grade. The ward is in the central part of the town of Barnsley, a market town until the coming of the Industrial Revolution. Its main industry was wire-drawing, and it later became the centre of English linen weaving. However, later developments in the town has led to the destruction of many of its older buildings.

Most of the listed buildings in the ward are houses and associated structures, shops and offices. The other listed buildings include churches and chapels, public houses and hotels, former industrial buildings, banks, public buildings, cemetery buildings, a war memorial, and two telephone kiosks.

== Key ==
Grade	Criteria
II*	Particularly important buildings of more than special interest
II	Buildings of national importance and special interest

== Buildings ==
Name and location	Photograph	Date	Notes	Grade
St Mary's Church; 53.55543°N 1.48285°W		c. 1400	The oldest part of the church is the tower, the rest of the church was rebuilt in 1819–22 by Woodhead and Hurst, and it was restored in 1869–70 by G. F. Bodley. The tower is in Perpendicular, and the rest is in Early English style. The church consists of a nave with a clerestory, north and south aisles, north and south porches, a chancel with side chapels, a north vestry and a west tower. The tower has two tall stages, diagonal buttresses, a west door, a three-light west window, and an embattled parapet with eight crocketed pinnacles. There are embattled parapets and crocketed pinnacles elsewhere on the church, and the east window has five lights.	II*
41–43 Church Street; 53.55555°N 1.48221°W	—	Late 15th century	A timber framed house that has been much altered and restored. It has brick encasing and a stone slate roof. Initially a hall house, a cross-wing was added a few years later. There have been further extensions, and parts of the house have been demolished. At the west end is a single-storey hall range, at the south is a two-storey two-chamber cross-wing, and under the front chamber is a cellar. On the front is a modern shop front, and the rear is partly rendered with some exposed timber framing.	II
The Old Number 7 Public House; 53.55316°N 1.48185°W		Mid 18th century	The public house is in painted stone, with sill band, a moulded eaves cornice, and a slate roof. There are three storeys and three bays, the left bay recessed and containing a round-arched passage entry. In the rest of the ground floor are pilasters carrying a frieze and a cornice. The upper floors contain windows with moulded architraves.	II
16 Market Hill; 53.55344°N 1.48141°W	—	Mid to late 18th century	A stone shop with quoins, a moulded eaves cornice, and a Welsh slate roof with a coped gable on a square kneeler on the right. There are four storeys and two bays. In the ground floor is a modern shop front, and the upper floors contain sash windows.	II
12 and 14 Market Hill; 53.55351°N 1.48144°W	—	Late 18th century	A pair of stone shops with sill bands, a moulded eaves cornice, and a tile roof with a coped gable on a square kneeler on the right. There are four storeys and three bays. In the ground floor are modern shop fronts, and the upper floors contain sash windows.	II
Former Royal Hotel; 53.55388°N 1.48152°W		Late 18th century	The building is in stone, partly painted, with quoins, bands, moulded gutter brackets, and a Welsh slate roof with coped gables. There are three storeys, seven bays, and a rear wing. The round-arched doorway has a moulded surround and splayed jambs. The windows in the upper floors are sashes, and in the ground floor they are replacements.	II
Former Wesleyan Chapel; 53.55351°N 1.48570°W		1791–92	The chapel was extended in 1811, and since 1859 it has been used for other purposes. It is in stone with a band, a moulded eaves cornice, and a Welsh slate roof. There are two storeys, a three-bay bowed front, slightly recessed side wings, and a later extension on the left. The windows have round-arched heads, moulded imposts, and grooved voussoirs. In each wing are two round-arched doorways, one of which is blocked, and at the rear is a central doorway with a canopy.	II
23 Church Street; 53.55463°N 1.48186°W	—	Late 18th century	A house later used for other purposes, it is rendered, and has a Welsh slate roof with chamfered gable copings on cut kneelers. There are three storeys and three bays, and the windows are replacement casements.	II
Warehouse, George Yard; 53.55368°N 1.48055°W		Late 18th or early 19th century	The warehouse on a corner site, later converted for other uses, is in stone, with three storeys and seven bays, and a rounded corner on the right. The main doorway is round-arched, with a large pointed hood mould containing a beehive motif, and the flanking windows have moulded cornices, the right window with two lights. In the left bay is a square-headed entrance, and most of the windows are sashes.	II
Salem Wesleyan Reformed Church; 53.55100°N 1.48285°W		1825	The church is in stone, with a Welsh slate roof, two storeys, and fronts of three and two bays. On the front is a pedimented gable with an inscribed and dated tablet in the tympanum. The front contains a double door with a fanlight, and the windows on the front and the sides are sashes.	II
13 and 15 Regent Street; 53.55434°N 1.48019°W		Early 19th century	A house on a corner site, later used for other purposes, it is in stone, with moulded gutter brackets, and a Welsh slate roof with coped gables and a parapet. There are three storeys, an attic and a basement, and symmetrical fronts of three bays. On the front is a central doorway with panelled jambs, a frieze, and a cornice, and the windows in both fronts are sashes. On the right return is a central square porch containing a round-arched doorway, and the window above it has a moulded architrave, a frieze, and a cornice. At the top is a pedimented gable.	II
Gate piers and walls, St Mary's Church; 53.55514°N 1.48286°W		Early 19th century (probable)	The walls enclosing the churchyard are in stone with moulded coping, ramped in places. On the south side is a pair of chamfered gate piers with bases, and moulded caps, and between them is an iron overthrow. There is also a smaller gateway, also with an overthrow.	II
17 Huddersfield Road; 53.55807°N 1.48445°W	—	c. 1830	A house, later used for other purposes, it is in stone, the sides are rendered, it has a sill band, a moulded eaves cornice and blocking course, and a hipped Welsh slate roof. There are two storeys, symmetrical fronts of three bays, and a rear addition. In the centre of the entrance front is a Doric portico, and the windows are sashes, those in the ground floor in segmental-arched recesses, and the window above the portico with a cornice on brackets.	II
Former carriage house, 17 Huddersfield Road; 53.55813°N 1.48474°W	—	c. 1830	The carriage house, later used for other purposes, is in stone with a hipped Welsh slate roof. There are two storeys and four bays, the middle two bays projecting under a pediment with a lunette in the tympanum. In the centre is a round-arched carriage entrance with voussoirs, flanked by round-arched blind windows, and sash windows above. The right bay contains two round-arched windows and a sash window above. In the left bay, and in the left return facing the road, are large casement windows in the ground floor and smaller casement windows above.	II
Mounting block and kennel, 17 Huddersfield Road; 53.55799°N 1.48447°W	—	c. 1830	The mounting block is adjacent to the portico of the house. It is in stone, with three steps on one side, and four on the other. At the front is a round-arched opening to a kennel, above which is a hood mould.	II
15 Market Hill; 53.55290°N 1.48166°W	—	Early to mid 19th century	A shop, later a public house, it is in stone with a Welsh slate roof. There are three storeys, a front with one bay, and a pedimented gable containing a lunette. In the ground floor is a modern shop front, the window in the middle floor has been altered, the top floor contains a tripartite window, and in the right return are sash windows.	II
Cass's Warehouse; 53.55498°N 1.48371°W		Early to mid 19th century	A linen warehouse, later used for other purposes, it is in stone on a plinth, with paired moulded gutter brackets, and a hipped pantile roof. There are three storeys, and sides of three and six bays. The doorway has an architrave and a cornice, and the windows are a mix of sashes and casements.	II
Former carriage house, Cass's Warehouse; 53.55478°N 1.48375°W	—	Early to mid 19th century	The former carriage house and stable block is in stone with a floor band, and a hipped pantile roof. There are two storeys and five bays, the middle three bays projecting under a pediment containing a lunette. In the centre is a carriage entrance with an elliptical arch and an oculus on each side, and above are three casement windows. The outer bays contain doorways and windows, each with a pitching hole in the upper floor.	II
Temperance Hall; 53.55186°N 1.48344°W		1836–37	Originally an Oddfellows Hall, later used for other purposes, it is in stone, the front painted, with a tile roof. On the front are three bays, a single storey, a podium of three steps, and two fluted Ionic columns in antis. The entrance is recessed and has an architrave, and in the side bays are doors with fanlights and architraves. Above is a frieze, and a pediment with acroteria.	II
1 Queen Street; 53.55250°N 1.48122°W		c. 1839	A shop on a corner site, in stone, with a modillion pediment, and a Welsh slate roof. There are three storeys, a front of one bay, and four bays on the right return. In the ground floor is a modern shop front. The bay on the front contains a Venetian window in the middle floor, and above it is a tripartite window, each with a moulded cornice. In the right return are sash windows.	II
14 and 16 Regent Street; 53.55457°N 1.48014°W		c. 1840	A pair of mirror-image houses, later used for other purposes, they are in stone, with moulded gutter brackets, and a Welsh slate roof. There are two storeys and each house has three bays. The doorways in the outer bays have Doric doorcases with fluted columns, semicircular fanlights, and open modillioned pediments. The windows are a mix of sashes and casements, and to the left is an added carriage entrance with a sash window above.	II
17, 21 and 23 Regent Street; 53.55435°N 1.47991°W	—	c. 1847	A terrace of four houses, later offices, in stone, with moulded gutter brackets, and a Welsh slate roof. There are two storeys and each house has two bays. In each house there is an entrance to the right with panelled jambs and a triangular pediment, and the windows are sashes.	II
1 and 2 Peel Square; 53.55264°N 1.48164°W	—	1857	A pair of shops with offices in Italianate style. They are in stone, with a ground floor frieze and modillion cornice, a modillion moulded eaves cornice, and a Welsh slate roof. There are three storeys and seven bays. In the ground floor is a square-headed carriage entry with rusticated jambs. To its left are modern shop fronts, and to the right are two blind windows on a moulded plinth band. The windows are sashes, in the middle floor with round arches, archivolts and keystones, and in the top floor with square heads.	II
Yorkshire Bank; 53.55271°N 1.48144°W		1857	The bank, on a corner site, is in stone, and is in Italianate style. It has a rusticated ground floor, rusticated quoins, a modillion first floor cornice, a sill band, a modillion eaves cornice, a parapet, and a hipped Welsh slate roof. There are three storeys and attics, two bays on Peel Street, four bays on Market Hill, and a rounded bay on the corner. The doorway in the corner bay has an architrave, a swagged frieze, and a cornice. In the ground floor the windows have segmental heads, voussoirs, keystones, and aprons. The middle floor windows have round heads, architraves with pilasters, motifs in the spandrels, friezes, and cornices, and in the top floor they have segmental heads, architraves, and keystones. On the corner is a lead lantern with swept sides and elliptical windows, and in the roof are dormers.	II
Arcade between chapels, Barnsley Cemetery; 53.54630°N 1.46821°W		1860–61	The arcade linking the cemetery chapels, which have been largely demolished, is in stone. In the centre is an archway with a pointed arch, buttresses with pinnacles, and a gable with kneelers and a band decorated with trefoils in circles. This is flanked by a Gothic arcade with gables and buttresses.	II
Lodges and gateway, Barnsley Cemetery; 53.54686°N 1.46829°W		1860–61	At the entrance to the cemetery is a pointed archway with buttresses, kneelers, and iron finials. It is linked to the two lodges by low coped stone walls with iron railings. The lodges are in stone with Welsh slate roofs. The left lodge is a mortuary chapel and has a single storey, an octagonal plan, and a pyramidal roof, and it contains spherical triangle windows. The right lodge has two storeys, and four bays, the left part octagonal with a pyramidal roof. It contains a porch with an arched doorway, there is one gabled dormer, and most of the other windows are lancets.	II
Former Court House Building; 53.55469°N 1.47880°W		1861	The former court house building was designed by Charles Reeves in Italianate style, and later used for other purposes. It is on a corner site, in stone with a rusticated ground floor and vermiculated quoins, a ground floor cornice, a deep frieze with attic windows, and paired consoles carrying a modillion eaves cornice, and a hipped Welsh slate roof. There are two storeys and an attic, and fronts of six and five bays. On the front are two doorways, and above the right doorway is the Royal Coat of Arms. The ground floor openings have segmental heads, architraves and vermiculated keystones, and the windows are sashes. In the upper floor the round-headed windows are casements with archivolts, vermiculated keystones, spandrels, aprons, and dentilled sills. The piers between the windows have vermiculated panels.	II
Piers, wall and railings, Former Court House Building; 53.55462°N 1.47879°W	—	1861	The piers, wall and railings in front of the building were designed by Charles Reeves. There are five square stone piers, each with vermiculated panels and moulded caps, and one with an ornamental cast iron lamp standard. The wall is coped, and the railings are in cast iron, with bulbous rails and bars.	II
5 and 7 Regent Street; 53.55428°N 1.48110°W	—	1867	A pair of offices in stone, with a ground floor cornice, sill bands, a moulded eaves cornice, and a Welsh slate roof. There are three storeys, and each office has two bays. The doorways in the right bays have pilaster jambs, a semicircular fanlight, and a keystone, one dated. To the left are paired sash windows with pilaster jambs and round-cornered moulded heads. In the upper floors, the windows in the left bays are paired. The middle floor windows are round-arched with moulded heads, pilaster jambs and cornices, and in the top floor they are square-headed with pilaster jambs.	II
Former County Court; 53.55456°N 1.48065°W		1870–71	The former court house is in stone with a full entablature, a frieze, a panelled and balustraded parapet, and a hipped Welsh slate roof, and is in Italianate style. It is on a corner site, and has two storeys and a basement, and fronts of seven and four bays. The ground floor and outer bays of the upper floor are rusticated, and in the basement are square-headed windows. In the right bay, steps lead up to a Doric portico with a parapet containing a cartouche, and the ground floor windows have square heads, cut voussoirs, and dropped keystones. The upper floor is in the form of an Ionic colonnade with pilasters and engaged columns, and balustrades between them. The windows have round-arched heads, pilasters, architraves, and keystones.	II
Former Queen's Hotel and railings 53.55446°N 1.47869°W		1872	The former hotel is on a corner site, and is in stone, with sill bands, a dentilled cornice, and a panelled and balustraded parapet. There are three storeys and attics, three bays on Eldon Street, seven bays and an additional four bays on Regent Street, and three rounded bays on the corner. The original bays on Regent Street are symmetrical, the middle bay and the corner bays with pilasters and acanthus capitals. The middle bay contains a round-arched portal with a dentilled cornice on consoles, and a keystone with a carved head of Queen Victoria. The windows are sashes, those in the ground floor have round-arched heads with keystones and pointed hood moulds. In the middle floor, the central window has a segmental pediment and a balustrade with urns. The other windows have decorated heads, two with cornices on lions-head brackets. The top floor windows have architraves and decorative keystones, the central window with a round-arched tympanum containing two cornucopia. In front are decorative railings.	II
Premises of the National Union of Miners; 53.55717°N 1.48422°W		1872–74	The building on a corner site is in stone with a Welsh slate roof, two storeys, and attics. There are four bays on Victoria Road, seven on Huddersfield Road, and between them are four rounded bays on the corner. The rounded corner has a conical roof with iron cresting containing four dormers, to its left is a circular tower with a conical roof, and both have parapets with iron cresting. On the Huddersfield Road front, the first bay contains a circular oriel window, and in the third bay is a porch with an arched entrance, engaged colonnettes and a parapet. The fourth bay is taller and has an attic with paired windows and a balcony, corner finials, and a pavilion roof. The end bays on each front are gabled and each contains a canted bay window.	II
Former White Hart public house 53.55264°N 1.48182°W	—	Late 19th century	The public house, later used for other purposes, is in stone, with a rusticated ground floor and quoins, a ground floor cornice, a sill band, a modillion eaves cornice, a parapet, and a Welsh slate roof. The building is in Italianate style, with three storeys and three bays. To the left is a segmental-arched carriage entrance with voussoirs and a keystone. The windows are sashes, in the ground floor with segmental heads, keystones and aprons. The middle floor windows have round arches, architraves with pilasters, carved motifs in the spandrels, friezes and cornices. In the top floor they have segmental heads, architraves and keystones.	II
Civic Hall; 53.55344°N 1.47974°W		1876–77	The Civic Hall is in stone, with a dentilled first floor cornice, a modillion moulded eaves cornice, and a Welsh slate roof. There are three storeys and attics, and a front of seven bays, and the building is in Baroque style. In the centre is a two-storey round-arched portal flanked by panelled pilaster jambs with foliate capitals, a swagged frieze, a dentilled entablature, carved figures in the spandrels, and a keystone carved with a figure head. In the rest of the ground floor are modern shop fronts. The windows in the upper floors are round-headed with balustrades; some are single and others are triple. In the top floor are three balconies with urns. The attic storey contains eight dormers with circular windows and segmental pediments, and between them are ball finials.	II
9 Regent Street; 53.55429°N 1.48088°W	—	c. 1880	Offices on a corner site, in stone, with cornices between the floors, a moulded eaves cornice, a panelled parapet, and a Welsh slate roof. There are three storeys, four bays in Regent Street, five in Royal Street, and a curved bay on the corner. The doorway in the corner bay has pilaster jambs, a semicircular fanlight, and a cornice on shaped brackets, and there is a doorway on Regent Street with a round-arched head, spandrels, and a small cornice. The windows are square-headed sashes with moulded architraves.	II
The Old Post Office; 53.55425°N 1.48128°W	—	1881–82	The building is in stone at the front and brick at the sides, with a rusticated ground floor, sill bands, a moulded floor band, a modillion cornice, and a Welsh slate roof. It is in Italianate style, with three storeys and a symmetrical front of four bays. In each outer bay is a square-headed portal with coved grooved jambs, and a modillion cornice on scrolled brackets, decorated with lions' heads and floral bosses. The windows are square-headed sashes with moulded architraves, those in the middle floor with triangular pediments on scrolled brackets.	II
Co-op Jewellers; 53.55056°N 1.48028°W		1885	The shop, on a corner site, is in stone, with a lettered frieze between the top two floors, a moulded cornice and parapet, and a Welsh slate roof. There are three storeys, four bays on Wellington Street, seven on Market Street, and a bay on the corner. The entrance in the corner bay, and above it is a two-storey circular oriel window surmounted by a conical spire and an iron crest. The windows either have a single light, or are mullioned and transomed. On each front, one bay projects and has a blind pedimented dormer and ball finials. The right bay on Market Street contains a cart entry and, apart from this and the entrance, the ground floor is covered by applied materials.	II
St Peter's Church, wall and gateway 53.54840°N 1.47173°W		1893–1911	The church, designed by Temple Moore, is in brick with stone dressings and a Welsh slate roof, and consists of a nave, a west porch, a chancel with a clerestory, lean-to aisles, and a projecting apsidal chapel. On the southeast corner of the nave is a square bell turret with a pyramidal roof. Attached to the southwest is a short wall with two openings and arched gateway to the entrance area.	II*
8 and 10 Regent Street and 2 Eastgate; 53.55447°N 1.48100°W	—	1895	Offices on a corner site, in stone, with a dentilled eaves cornice, a deep parapet, and a Welsh slate roof. There are three storeys, three bays on Regent Street and five on Eastgate. In the centre of each front is a doorway with a moulded architrave, and open segmental pediment on ornamental brackets, with a decorative tympanum. On both fronts are two-storey oriel windows in the upper floors. The ground floor windows have aprons, those in the middle floor have triangular pediments, and in the top floor they have moulded heads and fleur-de-lys decoration. In the Eastgate front is an elliptical-arched carriage entrance with a moulded surround and voussoirs.	II
Former Theatre Royal; 53.55164°N 1.48194°W		1898	The theatre, later used for other purposes, is in stone on a chamfered plinth, with rusticated quoins, sill bands, a frieze, a moulded eaves cornice, and a blocking course. There are three storeys and five bays. In the ground floor are five round-arched entrances with blocked quoins or voussoirs, and doorways with fanlights and pediments. To the left is an elliptical-arched carriage entrance with a shaped coped gable and ball finials. In the upper floors are sash windows, those in the middle floor with either triangular or segmental pediments.	II
Former Yorkshire Bank; 53.55295°N 1.48117°W		1903	The former bank on a corner site is in stone on a plinth, with a ground floor frieze containing cartouches, shaped parapets, and a Welsh slate roof. There are three storeys, three bays on Market Hill, seven bays in Eldon Street, and a bay in the corner. The entrance in the corner bay has a lintel with a cartouche, and above it is an oriel window with a tile roof, and a dated plaque. At the top is a clock turret with a broken segmental pediment on tapering pilasters. The left bay in Market Hill projects slightly and has a gabled dormer. All the windows have square heads.	II
Holy Rood Church; 53.55064°N 1.48413°W		1905	The church is in stone with a Welsh slate roof. It consists of a nave, a five-sided baptistry, north and south lean-to aisles, north and south transepts, an apsidal chancel with a south chapel, and a northwest tower. The tower is square and rises to become octagonal with a stone spire, gargoyles, and moulded bands. At the west end is a portal with two cusped doorways and a crucifix in the tympanum, and above it is a six-light window.	II
Cooperative Building; 53.55057°N 1.47991°W		1911	A shop on a corner site, it is in stone, clad with glazed tiles, and is in Baroque style. There are three storeys, five bays on each front, and a curved bay on the corner. The ground floor has a modern shop front. Above this, the corner bay is flanked by buttresses and contains rounded windows, above which is a cartouche with an inscription in Art Nouveau lettering surmounted by a lion. On the New Street front is a two-storey canted bay window. On both fronts the windows in the middle floor have elliptical heads, in the top floor they have segmental heads, and all have alternately blocked jambs and voussoirs. In the middle floor are brackets with ball finials, and the top floor contains cartouches with figure heads. At the top is a moulded modillion eaves cornice, and a panelled and balustraded parapet.	II
Barnsley War Memorial; 53.55430°N 1.48215°W		1925	The memorial stands in front of the Town Hall, it was designed by William Thomas Curtis, and the sculptor was John Tweed. It consists of a bronze statue of a soldier in a greatcoat wearing a steel helmet and standing on a large sandstone pylon. The pylon has a large square capstone and recessed angles, a heavy rectangular base, and a moulded plinth on three steps. On the front of the pylon is an inscription, above which is a wreath in relief. There are inscriptions on both sides, and at the rear is a large bronze plaque in Art Nouveau style of a winged Victory.	II*
Barnsley Town Hall and railings 53.55427°N 1.48262°W		1933	The town hall was designed by Thornely and Briggs, and is in Portland stone with brick infill at the rear. There are three storeys, and a basement at the front, fronts of 21 and ten bays, two internal courtyards, and a central tower. At the front, the ground floor is rusticated, the middle five bays project, and in the centre is a portal with a dentilled cornice surmounted by an anthemion acroteria and a cartouche with scrolled support. In the upper two floors is a loggia with Corinthian columns and pilasters, and an iron balustrade, and in the back wall are three round-arched windows. The outer bays each contains a window with a cornice on console brackets, and a panel above. The other windows are square-headed casements, and at the top is a frieze, a cornice, and a parapet that is partly balustraded. The tower has three stages with urns on the base, the lowest stage with a niche containing a window with fluted Doric colonnettes, and an entablature with urns, and below it is a coat of arms. In the second stage are clock faces, and the top stage contains narrow windows, over which is a swagged frieze, and stepped blocking courses. The attached railings have Portland stone panelled piers, a dwarf wall, and cast iron railings.	II
Piers, raillings and steps, Barnsley Town Hall; 53.55412°N 1.48222°W		1933	The piers and railings enclose two gardens at the front of the town hall, and were designed by Thornely and Briggs. The piers are in Portland stone, and between them are dwarf walls and cast iron railings with pineapple finials. On the corner piers are cast iron lamp standards. Between the gardens are wide flights of steps leading up to the town hall.	II
Telephone kiosk outside 13 Church Street; 53.55413°N 1.48164°W		1935	The K6 type telephone kiosk outside 13 Church Street was designed by Giles Gilbert Scott. It is constructed in cast iron with a square plan and a dome, and has three unperforated crowns in the top panels.	II
Telephone kiosk outside 19–21 Church Street; 53.55457°N 1.48185°W	—	1935	The K6 type telephone kiosk outside 19–21 Church Street was designed by Giles Gilbert Scott. It is constructed in cast iron with a square plan and a dome, and has three unperforated crowns in the top panels.	II

== See also ==
- Listed buildings in Barnsley
