= Barnsley Town Hall =

Municipal building in Barnsley, South Yorkshire, England

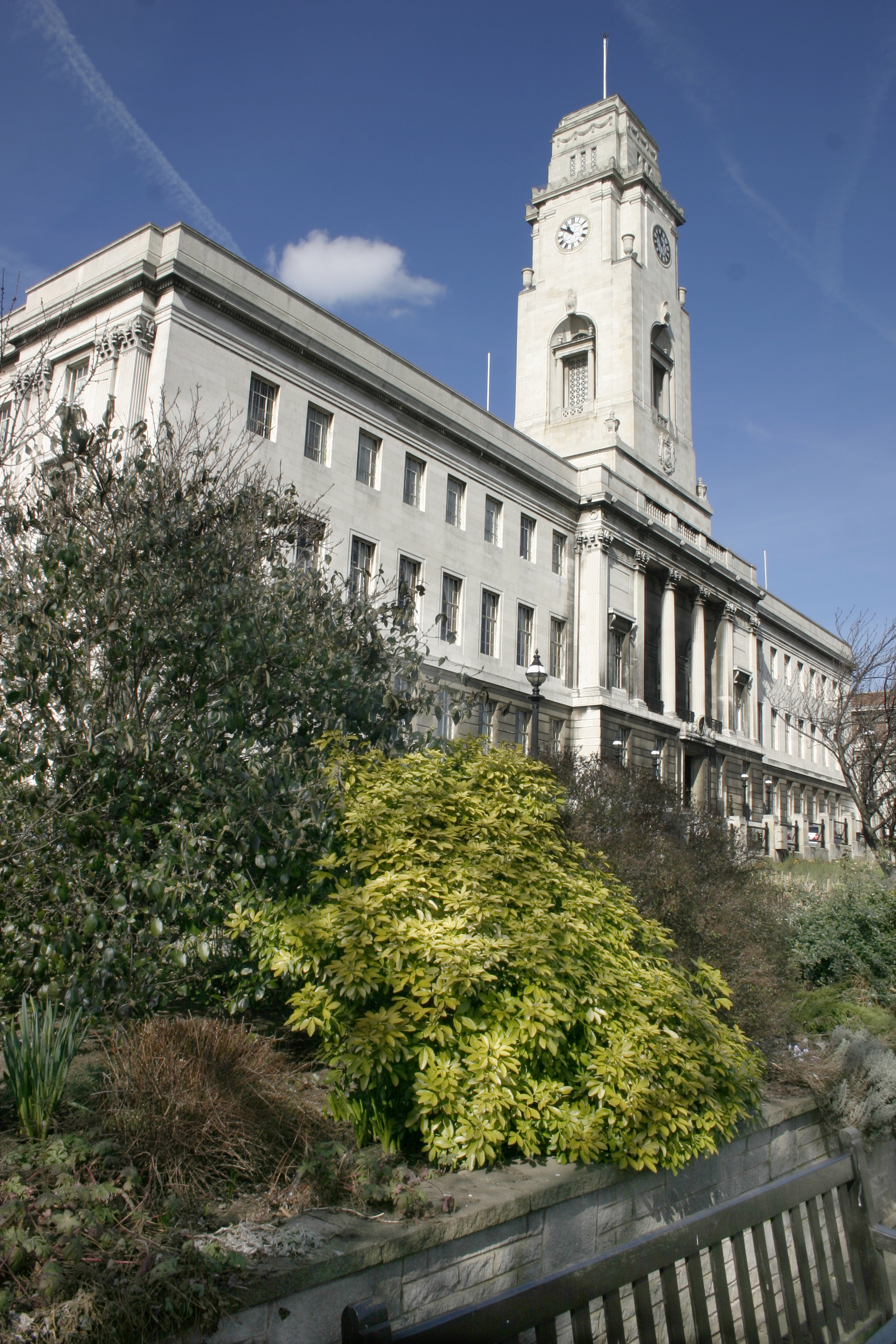
- Barnsley Town Hall

- Shown in South Yorkshire
- 53.5542°N 1.4827°W
- Location: Barnsley

History
- Built: 1933

Site notes
- Architect: Sir Arnold Thornely
- Architectural style: Classical style
- Website: www.barnsley.gov.uk

Listed Building – Grade II
- Designated: 13 January 1986
- Reference no.: 1151143

Barnsley Town Hall is the seat of local government in the Metropolitan Borough of Barnsley, South Yorkshire, England. It is a Grade II listed building.

== Building ==
=== Design and construction ===
The site selected for the new building in Church Street had previously been occupied by a row of domestic properties. The foundation stone for the building was laid by Councillor Robert Plummer, a former mayor, on 21 April 1932. The facility, which was designed by Sir Arnold Thornely in the classical style and built of Portland stone at a cost of was £148,697, was officially opened by the Prince of Wales on 14 December 1933. The design included a large Corinthian distyle with pilasters on the first and second floors of the building as well as a 44 metres (144 ft) high three-stage reducing central tower, incorporating a public clock by Gillett & Johnston.

George Orwell, in his book The Road to Wigan Pier, was highly critical of this expenditure, and said that the council should have spent the money on improving the housing and living conditions of the local miners.

=== Museum ===
In June 2013, Experience Barnsley, a museum dedicated to the history of the town and its people, which had previously been based in the old Central Library, moved into a part of the town hall which had been designated the "Experience Barnsley Museum and Discovery Centre". Exhibits put on display include a 5,000 year old axe head which was found at the Scout Dyke Reservoir near Penistone in the 1920s.

== Adjacent to the building ==
=== War memorial ===
The war memorial in front of the building, which predates the town hall, was sculpted by John Tweed and was unveiled at a ceremony attended by General Sir Charles Harington on 11 October 1925.

=== Barnsley Pals Centenary Square ===
In September 2013 the Earl of Wessex, officially opened the Barnsley Pals Centenary Square on the south side of the town hall, which commemorates the lives of the Barnsley Pals who died in the First World War.

== Visitors ==
Queen Elizabeth II, accompanied by the Duke of Edinburgh, visited the town hall and signed the visitors' book on 27 October 1954; the Royal Standard was flown from the mast on the central tower of the town hall during her visit.

== See also ==
- Listed buildings in Barnsley (Central Ward)
