= Listed buildings in Barnsley =

The listed buildings in Barnsley are arranged by wards as follows:

- Listed buildings in Barnsley (Central Ward)
- Listed buildings in Barnsley (Kingstone Ward)
- Listed buildings in Barnsley (Old Town Ward)
