= John Minshull-Ford =

British Army general (1881–1948)

Major-General John Minshull-Ford CB DSO MC
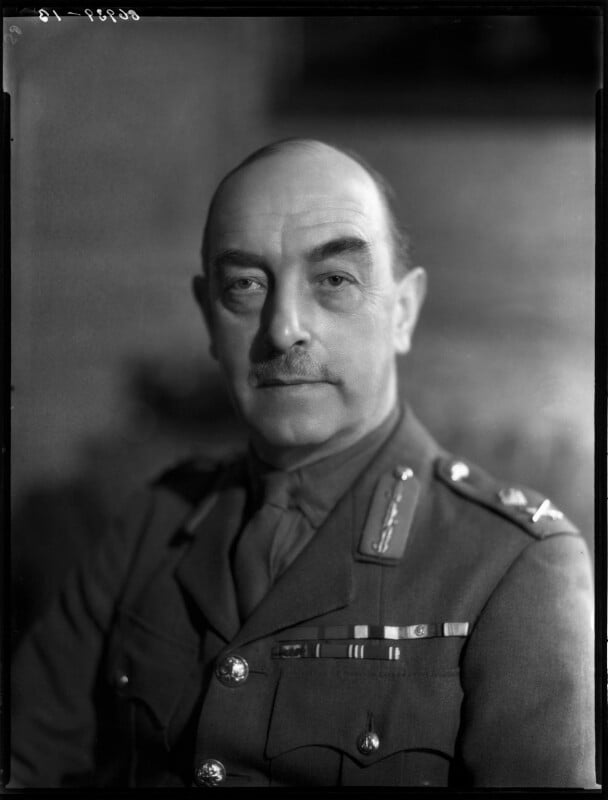
- Minshull-Ford in 1940
- Born: 12 May 1881
- Died: 1 April 1948 (aged 66)
- Military career
- Allegiance: United Kingdom
- Branch: British Army
- Service years: 1900–1940
- Rank: Major-General
- Unit: Royal Welsh Fusiliers
- Commands: 1st Battalion, South Staffordshire Regiment; 5th Infantry Brigade; 44th (Home Counties) Division
- Conflicts: World War I World War II
- Awards: Companion of the Order of the Bath; Distinguished Service Order; Military Cross

Major-General John Randle Minshull-Ford CB DSO MC (12 May 1881 – 1 April 1948) was a senior British Army officer who briefly served as Lieutenant Governor of Guernsey before the German Occupation in 1940.

== Military career ==
Educated at Twyford School, Minshull-Ford was commissioned into the Royal Welch Fusiliers in 1900.

He served in World War I as commander of the 1st Bn of his regiment in the British Expeditionary Force and was wounded at the Battle of Neuve Chapelle in March 1915. He was promoted to major in September and continued his war service as a brigade commander, having been promoted to temporary brigadier general in February 1916, in the Home Forces and then later in France.

After the War he was briefly a brigade commander in the British Army of the Rhine and then served as commanding officer of 1 Bn South Staffordshire Regiment from 1925. He was appointed a personal aide-de-camp to King George V on 15 April 1930, taking over this role from Colonel Llewelyn Price-Davies. He was commander of the 5th Infantry Brigade at Aldershot Command in 1930. He relinquished this assignment on 19 March 1932 and was General Officer Commanding 44th (Home Counties) Division in April 1934 before retiring in April 1938.

He was briefly Lieutenant Governor of Guernsey in 1940 just before the German Occupation.

== Family ==
In 1912 he married Dorothy Harmood-Banner, a daughter of the Liverpool accountant and M.P., Sir John Sutherland Harmood-Banner.

Military offices
Preceded by John Kennedy	GOC 44th (Home Counties) Division; 1935–1938	Succeeded by Edmund Osborne
Government offices
Preceded by Alexander Telfer-Smollett	Lieutenant Governor of Guernsey; 7 June 1940–20 June 1940	Succeeded by German Occupation
