= List of mayors of Barnsley =

Civic Mayor of Barnsley
- Incumbent; Liam Hardcastle since 29 May 2026
- Appointer: Barnsley Metropolitan Borough Council
- Term length: 1 year
- Inaugural holder: Henry Richardson
- Formation: 1869
- Deputy: Deputy Mayor of Barnsley
- Website: Mayor of Barnsley

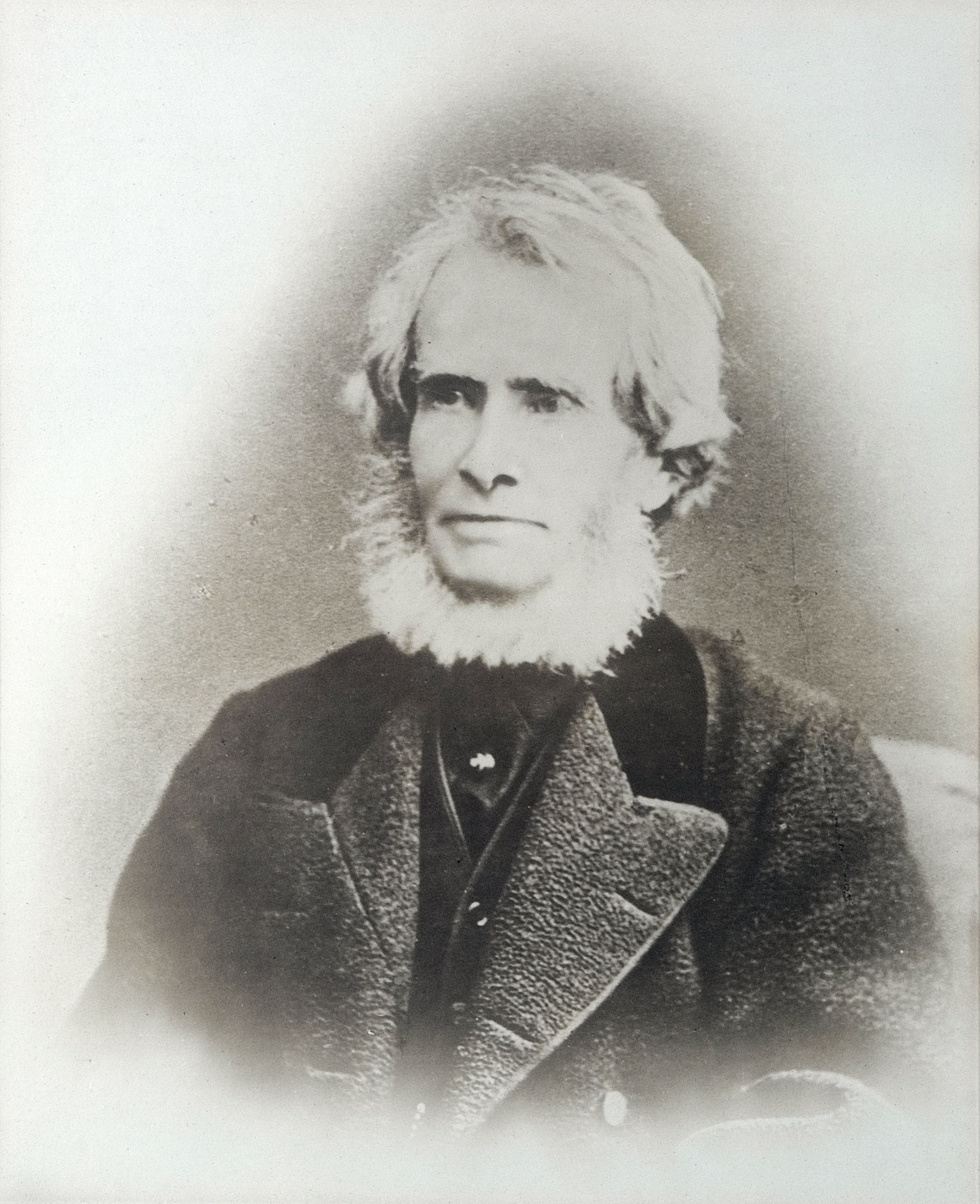
Henry Richardson, first Mayor of Barnsley, 1869

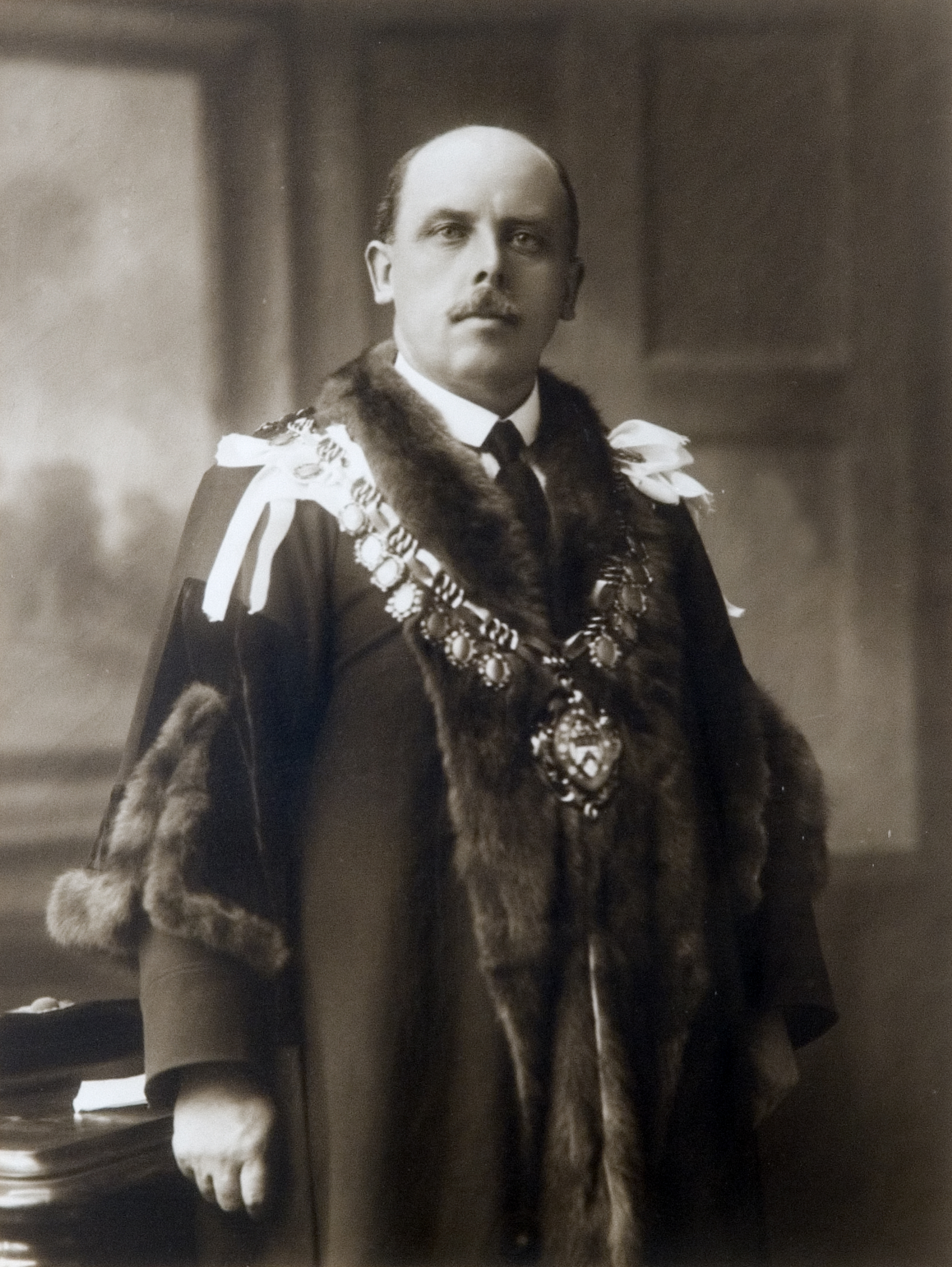
Sam Jones, son of a miner, was Barnsley's first socialist mayor

The Mayor of Barnsley is a ceremonial post held by a member of Barnsley Metropolitan Borough Council, elected annually by the Council. The post was previously given to members of the Municipal Borough of Barnsley from 1869 to 1912, and to members of the County Borough of Barnsley from 1913 to 1974.

== Notable mayors ==
The first mayor of Barnsley was Henry Richardson, in 1869; he had been "instrumental in the founding of the Borough." The first female mayor, elected by a Labour-controlled council, was Mary Brannon in 1956. After her election, she removed seven pictures of the Royal Family from the mayoral parlour, and replaced them with local scenes created by art students. Brannon said, "I got bored stiff with the sameness of the photographs." It was Brannon who on 6 May 1957 opened the Edward Sheerien Secondary Modern School, the first of its kind to be built in the borough since World War II. In 1929 Sheerien had also been mayor, and the school was named after him with respect to his "great services to the borough," including over 25 years' duty on the education committee.

== List of mayors of the Municipal Borough of Barnsley ==
Source.

- 1869 Henry Richardson (1798–1875) was a West Riding magistrate, and head of Richardson, Lee, Rycroft & Co., linen manufacturers of Manchester and Barnsley.
- 1870–1871 John Tyas (1817–1895) was a Conservative councillor for the Barnsley Corporation, and twice Mayor of Barnsley, serving 1870–1872, and 1883–1884. He was a solicitor, being partner in the Barnsley firm Tyas and Harrison from around 1845. He was clerk of the Barnsley Board of Guardians 1850–1893, and president of the English Church Union in Barnsley. He owned Edmunds and Swaithe Maine Collieries. The 1875 explosion at Swaithe mine shocked him, and subsequently he helped to establish the Miner's Permanent Relief Fund. At his death, he was said to have been "highly esteemed".
- 1872–1873 Charles Newman (1829–1886) was a solicitor of the Barnsley firm Newman & Sons, the chief magistrate at Barnsley, and secretary of the South West Riding Liberal Registration Association. He was director of Barnsley Bank and of Barnsley Gas Light Company. He was honorary secretary to Beckett Hospital, and to the trustees of Barnsley Grammar School. He was twice mayor, and an alderman of the Corporation since its inception in 1869. On 26 March 1873, Newman became the first Mayor of Barnsley to wear the town's official mayoral robes. He was a bachelor
- 1874–1875 Richard Carter (1818–1895) improved drainage and water supply to the borough during his tenure as mayor. He was a civil engineer and geologist, but was also a partner in Carter Bros. linen manufacturers at Oak Mills. He was a member of the Corporation from its inception in 1869, and he was a Justice of the Peace, a Conservative and a Freemason. He was a bachelor.
- 1876–1877 Joseph Shirtliffe Parkinson (1816–1878) was a linen manufacturer and Liberal who died in office as mayor. He was chairman of the Finance Committee and a member of the Local Board of Health. His funeral procession was "very large" and he was interred in Barnsley Cemetery. There is a window dedicated to JS Parkinson in the north aisle of St Mary's Church, Barnsley.
- 1878–1880 Benjamin Marshall (1816–1890) was a solicitor who was a "thorn in the side" of the Board of Health and its clerk. He was a member of the Town Council 1872–1884, being "respected and feared" there as a financier and economist, but popular with the public. He subsequently became a Liberal MP for Barnsley. He never married.
- 1881–1882 Charles Brady (1832–1907) was a draper's son who in 1869 became Liberal MP for Barnsley east ward. He was an alderman on West Riding County Council, and chairman of its Finance Committee. He was chairman of the governors of Barnsley Beckett Hospital, and a "strong promoter of temperance."
- 1883 John Tyas
- 1884–1885 Henry Pigott (1828–1912) inherited from his father the linen factory Shaw Mill at Barnsley. He was a Wesleyan, a Liberal Unionist, a Justice of the Peace, and chairman of the Borough Licensing Committee. As mayor he contributed much to the Highways and Waterworks departments. He was a member of the School Board, the Borough Education Committee and the County Council.
- 1886–1888 Thomas Marsden (1831–1893) Was the owner of Dearne Paper Works, and head of Charles Marsden & Sons, paper manufacturers. He was a "popular" mayor, and a magistrate from 1889. He was president of the Barnsley Chamber of Commerce, a director of the Barnsley Banking Company, and a member of the Barnsley Board of Guardians.
- 1889–1890 Eugene Wood (1834–1892) was born in France, because his glassworker father William Baker Wood was working there. Eugene moved to England; in 1854 his father joined him, bought the Barnsley Glassworks, and later renamed it the Wood Brothers Glassworks. By 1891 Eugene was a glass manufacturer himself, employing 130 men and boys. He was a member of Sheffield Road Baptist Chapel and was elected a deacon there. He was also president of the Barnsley Permanent Building Society, chairman of the directors of McLintock & Co., and president of the Barnsley Sunday School Union.
- 1891 Dr John Blackburn (1834–1906) was medical officer for the Barnsley Board of Guardians, and surgeon major (lieutenant colonel from 1889) to the 2nd Voluntary Battalion of the Y and L Regiment. He was councillor for Barnsley south ward 1869–1884, then alderman until 1896. He was instrumental in the establishment of the Corporation swimming baths.
- 1892–1893 Matthew Corri S. Halton (1843–1899) was born in Mullingar, Ireland. His father was the Catholic Cathedral organist there for 50 years. His son Thomas William died in France in 1918. There is an elaborate memorial to the family in Barnsley Cemetery. He was a medical doctor, a Roman Catholic and a Liberal. He was mayor during the 1893 UK Miners' Strike, engaged along with the miners against the police during the riots. But as mayor he had to keep the peace, and that conflict caused the loss of his previous popularity with the people.
- 1894–1895 William Woodcock (1838–1902) was a saddler and harness maker who campaigned against the "sacrifice" of Barnsley by the 1869 Reform Bill. In 1885 he became Liberal MP for the south-west ward of Barnsley. From 1893 he was chairman of Barnsley Corporation Finance Committee, and from 1896 he was a magistrate. He was a prominent Wesleyan at Pitt Street Chapel, Barnsley.
- 1896–1897 Charles Wray (1844–1931) was a butcher from Lincolnshire who built up an "extensive business" in Barnsley. He was Liberal councillor for the west ward of Barnsley from 1889, and retired as alderman in 1924. He was president of the District Butchers' Association. He was a supporter of Blucher Street United Methodist Church and of the Tradesmen's Benevolent Institution. He was made Freeman of the Borough in 1921, before his retirement.
- 1898–1899 Thomas Wilkinson (1842–1908) was a prosperous grain merchant, and property owner of estates on which he farmed, in Lincolnshire and near Doncaster. He also owned property in Barnsley. He served on Barnsley Council from 1882 to 1905 as councillor for the east ward. He donated the public clock on the Ebenezer Methodist Chapel on Sheffield Road (built 1873, closed 1975). He was chairman of the Sanitary Committee and an overseer of the poor. He was magistrate from 1896.
- 1900–1901 John Fletcher Horne (1848–1941) was a surgeon at Barnsley Beckett Hospital, and was on the town council for 33 years. He travelled in Italy, and wrote medical and antiquarian books, including: Trephining in its ancient and modern aspect (1894), The cities of Vesuvius, Herculaneum and Pompeii (1895), The mirage of two buried cities (1900), Hints to mothers on the management of young children (undated)
- 1902 William Emsley Raley (1859–1938) was a solicitor whose firm represented the Mineworkers' Association. He served on Barnsley Council for 50 years from 1887. He was instrumental in street improvement, the building of Barnsley Town Hall (1933), and the building of Midhope reservoir. His policy later permitted Scout Dyke and Royd Moor reservoirs. He was an educationalist on the Burnham committee, and was President of the Association of Education Committees in England and Wales. In World War I he was chairman of the Battalion-Raising Committee and Commanding Officer of the Second Barnsley Battalion.
- 1903–1904 Charles Wray
- 1905–1907 John Shaw Rose (1862–1935) was head of Brown and Rose clothing manufacturers. He served as a Conservative councillor for 35 years on Barnsley council, 1897–1933. He was initially a rugby player, then turned to association football and became chairman of Barnsley Football Club from 1909 to January 1933. He was known as the "Children's Mayor." He was a Justice of the Peace and served on various committees. He was warden of St John's Church, and a freemason. He is buried at Barnsley Cemetery.
- 1908 Edmund John Freeman Rideal (1858–1936) was a solicitor, and served on Barnsley Council for 33 years. He was chairman of the Finance Committee, and an overseer for 30 years. He was chairman of Barnsley Education Committee, and a governor of Barnsley Girls High School and Barnsley Grammar School.
- 1909–1910 Henry Milnes Walker (1868–1945) was a Justice of the Peace, solicitor and Baptist from Kexborough who served on Barnsley Council from 1902. He was president of the local Band of Hope Union, of the Union of Sunday Schools, and of Barnsley YMCA.
- 1911–1912 Joseph Hobson Cotterill (1857–1920) was a provision merchant and a Conservative. While he was mayor, Barnsley became a County Borough. He was mayor when Barnsley FC won the English Cup, and he officially welcomed them home. He was chairmen of the Markets and Fairs Committee and School Management Committee, and a member of the Barnsley Education Committee from its inception. He was a sidesman for St John's Church.

== List of mayors of the County Borough of Barnsley ==
Source.

- 1913–1914 William Goodworth England (1855–1928)
- 1915–1917 Henry Holden (1857–1937)
- 1918–1919 William Emsley Raley (1859–1938)
- 1920–1922 Sam Jones (1869–1935)
- 1923–1924 George Fred Wood (1870–1956)
- 1925–1926 Herbert Foulstone (1871–1955)
- 1927–1928 John Fair Broley (1873–1944)
- 1929 Edward Sheerien (1879–1958)
- 1930 Richard John Soper (1878–1954)
- 1931 Robert Jonas Plummer (1882–1954)
- 1932 Herbert Smith (1862–1938)
- 1933 John Guest
- 1934 Benjamin Francis Canter (1888–1938)
- 1935–1937 Joseph Jones (1891–1948)
- 1937–1938 Andrew Wright
- 1938–1939 Henry Mowbray Cassells (1889–1944)
- 1939–1940 George Mason
- 1940–1941 James Walton
- 1941–1942 David Allott (1868–1947)
- 1942–1943 Sam Trueman (1886–1970)
- 1943–1944 Thomas Willman Richardson (1880–1948)
- 1944–1945 Arthur Jepson
- 1945–1946 Arthur Dunk (1893–1970)
- 1946–1947 Charles Bentley(1887–1970)
- 1947–1949 Harold Burgin
- 1949–1950 Walter Hunt
- 1950–1951 William Leach
- 1951–1952 Richard Newman (1877–1962)
- 1952–1953 Lawrence Briggs (1887–1970)
- 1953–1954 George Burkinshaw (1894–1968)
- 1954–1955 Alfred Edward McVie (1900–1973)
- 1955–1956 James Henry Foster (1891–1971)
- 1956–1957 Mary Brannan
- 1957–1958 Sam Jubb (1885–1973)
- 1958–1959 George Skelly (1902–1969)
- 1959–1960 George Whyke (1900–1986)
- 1960–1961 William Gill
- 1961–1962 Fred Elliott
- 1962–1963 Harry Dancer
- 1963–1964 Thomas Richard Brown
- 1964–1965 Fred Lockwood
- 1965–1966 Arthur Butler
- 1966–1967 William Martin Chambers {1907–1977)
- 1967–1968 James Arthur Halton (1891–1968)
- 1968–1969 Albert Lowery (1894–1973)
- 1969–1970 Theodore Hinchcliffe
- 1970–1971 Frank Batley Crow (1907–1999)
- 1971–1972 Brian Varley
- 1972–1973 Fred Lunn
- 1973–1974 Arthur Williams

== List of mayors of the Metropolitan Borough of Barnsley ==
Source.

- 1974–1975 James Fenwick Oldham
- 1975–1976 Harold Brain
- 1976–1977 Frank Kaye
- 1977–1978 John Charles Stanley
- 1978–1979 Gwen Bright
- 1979–1980 Harry Alexander Fish
- 1980–1981 Edward Galvin
- 1981–1982 John D. Wake
- 1982–1983 Charles Kenneth Rispin
- 1983–1984 Keith M. Borrett
- 1984–1985 Donald Baines
- 1985–1986 Derrick Elias Lloyd
- 1986–1987 John Wood
- 1987–1988 Roy Warden
- 1988–1989 Bernard G. Goddard
- 1989–1990 Arnold M. Storey
- 1990–1991 Ronald Fisher
- 1991–1992 Trevor Naylor
- 1992–1993 Kenneth Young
- 1993–1994 Gerald Hadfield
- 1994–1995 Judith Watts
- 1995–1996 Clive Cawthrow
- 1995–1996 Judith Watts
- 1996–1997 Clarence Wroe
- 1997–1998 Charles C. Wraith
- 1998–1999 Fred Wright
- 1999–2000 Howard Lavender
- 2000–2001 Arthur Whittaker
- 2001–2002 Catherine Evans
- 2002–2003 Peter Doyle
- 2003–2004 William H. Newman
- 2004–2005 Patrick R. Miller
- 2005–2006 Joseph W. Hayward
- 2006–2007 Margaret Morgan
- 2007–2008 Len Picken (1927–2012)
- 2008–2009 Ken Sanderson
- 2009–2010 John Parkinson
- 2010–2011 Margaret Sheard
- 2011–2012 Karen Dyson
- 2012–2013 Leah Dorothy Higginbottom
- 2013–2014 Kenneth Richardson
- 2014–2015 Tim Shepherd
- 2015–2016 Brian H. Mathers (b.1941)
- 2016–2017 Linda Burgess
- 2017–2018 Jeff Ennis (b.1952)
- 2018–2019 Steve Green
- 2019–2020 Pauline Markham
- 2020–2021 Caroline Makinson
- 2021–2022 Caroline Makinson
- 2022–2023 Sarah Tattersall
- 2023–2024 James Michael Stowe
- 2024–2025 John Clarke
- 2025–2026 David James Leech
- 2026–present Liam Hardcastle
