= Barnsley Pals =

Barnsley Pals 13th & 14th (Service) Battalions, York and Lancaster Regiment (Barnsley)
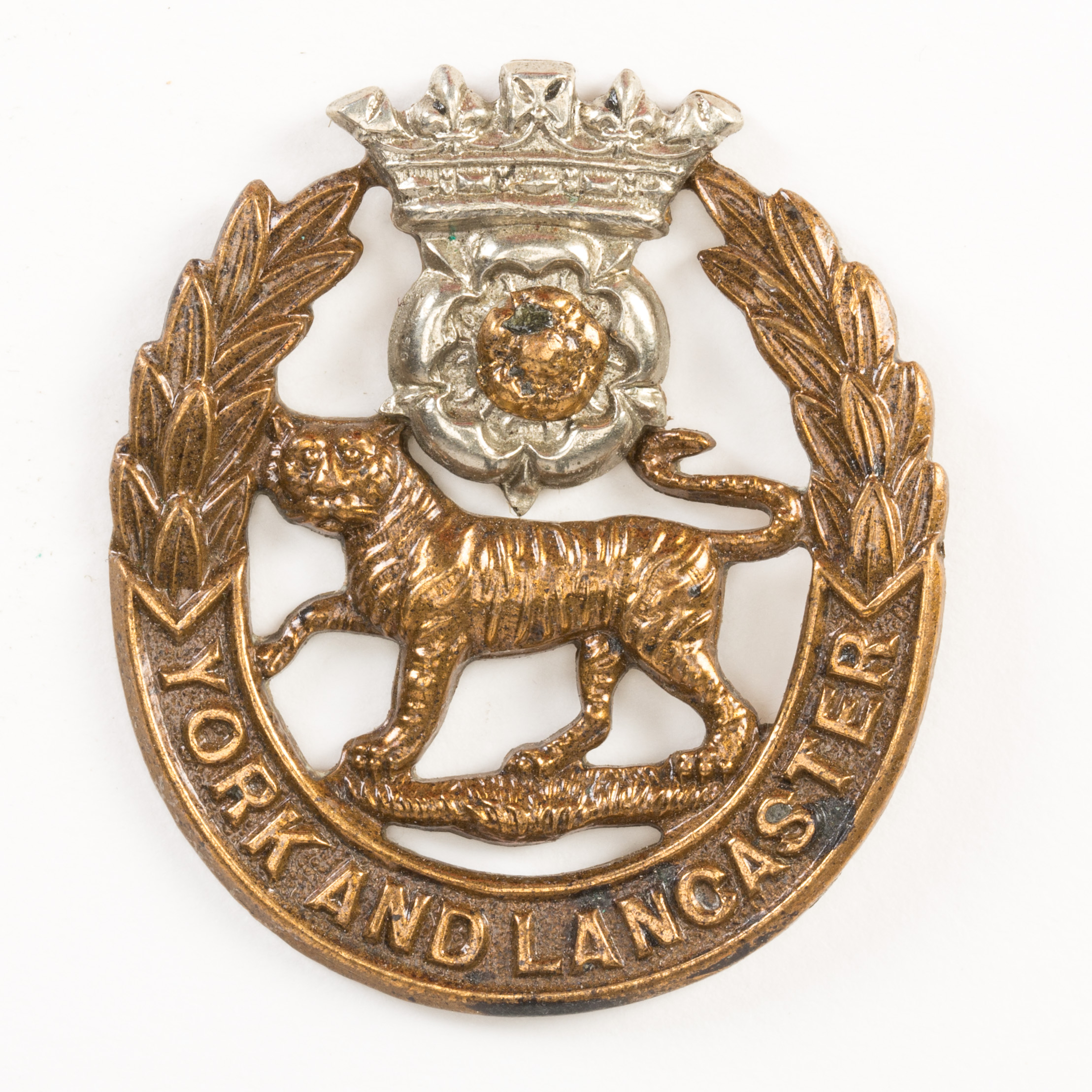
- Cap badge of the York & Lancaster Regiment
- Active: 17 September 1914–29 May 1919
- Allegiance: United Kingdom
- Branch: New Army
- Type: Pals battalions
- Role: Infantry
- Size: Two battalions
- Part of: 31st Division
- Garrison/HQ: Barnsley
- Patron: Mayor and Town of Barnsley
- Engagements: Battle of the Somme; Third Battle of the Scarpe; Capture of Oppy Wood; German spring offensive Battle of the Lys; Hundred Days Offensive

The Barnsley Pals were two 'Pals battalions' formed as part of 'Kitchener's Army' during World War I. Raised by local initiative in the town of Barnsley in the West Riding of Yorkshire and recruited largely from coalminers, they became the 13th and 14th (Service) Battalions of the local York and Lancaster Regiment (13th and 14th Y&L). After almost two years of training, the battalions suffered heavy casualties in a disastrous attack on the village of Serre on the first day of the Battle of the Somme. They continued to serve on the Western Front, including the Battle of Arras (1917). Combined into a single battalion in early in 1918, the Barnsley Pals were reduced to a remnant during the German spring offensive, but the battalion was rebuilt to participate in the final victorious Hundred Days Offensive.

== Recruitment ==
Alfred Leete's recruitment poster for Kitchener's Army.

On 6 August 1914, less than 48 hours after Britain's declaration of war, Parliament sanctioned an increase of 500,000 men for the Regular British Army, and the newly-appointed Secretary of State for War, Earl Kitchener of Khartoum issued his famous call to arms: 'Your King and Country Need You', urging the first 100,000 volunteers to come forward to form the 1st New Army ('K1'). A flood of volunteers poured into the recruiting offices across the country and were formed into 'Service' battalions of the county regiments.

However, these were soon joined by groups of men from particular localities or backgrounds who wished to serve together. Starting from Liverpool, Manchester, and London, the phenomenon of 'Pals battalions' quickly spread across the country, as local recruiting committees offered complete units to the War Office (WO). After a series of public meetings, the Mayor of Barnsley offered to raise a battalion of 1100 men from the town and its surrounding district: this offer was accepted by the WO, and recruitment opened on 17 September 1914. Joseph Hewitt, a local solicitor, made a half-time speech at the football match between Barnsley F.C. and Grimsby Town F.C. at Oakwell football ground on Saturday 19 September, which attracted numerous recruits. Many local miners joined; the men from Houghton Main Colliery arrived from Darfield by motor bus and then marched to the Public Hall to enlist (they formed the bulk of B Company). Hewitt, who had some experience in the Territorial Force, was appointed commanding officer (CO) with the rank of Lieutenant-Colonel. The other officers were nominated by the mayor, including Alderman William Raley as acting Major and second-in command. Battalion Headquarters (HQ) was established at the Harvey Institute.

By 3 October, the Barnsley Battalion had enrolled 1043 men of all ranks, and with recruits still coming in on 27 November, the Borough Council offered to raise a second battalion. This was accepted by the WO on 30 November with the proviso that a reserve company should first be raised for the 1st Barnsley Battalion. After that was completed, the 2nd Barnsley Pals were officially launched on 9 December with Alderman Raley as CO.

== Training ==
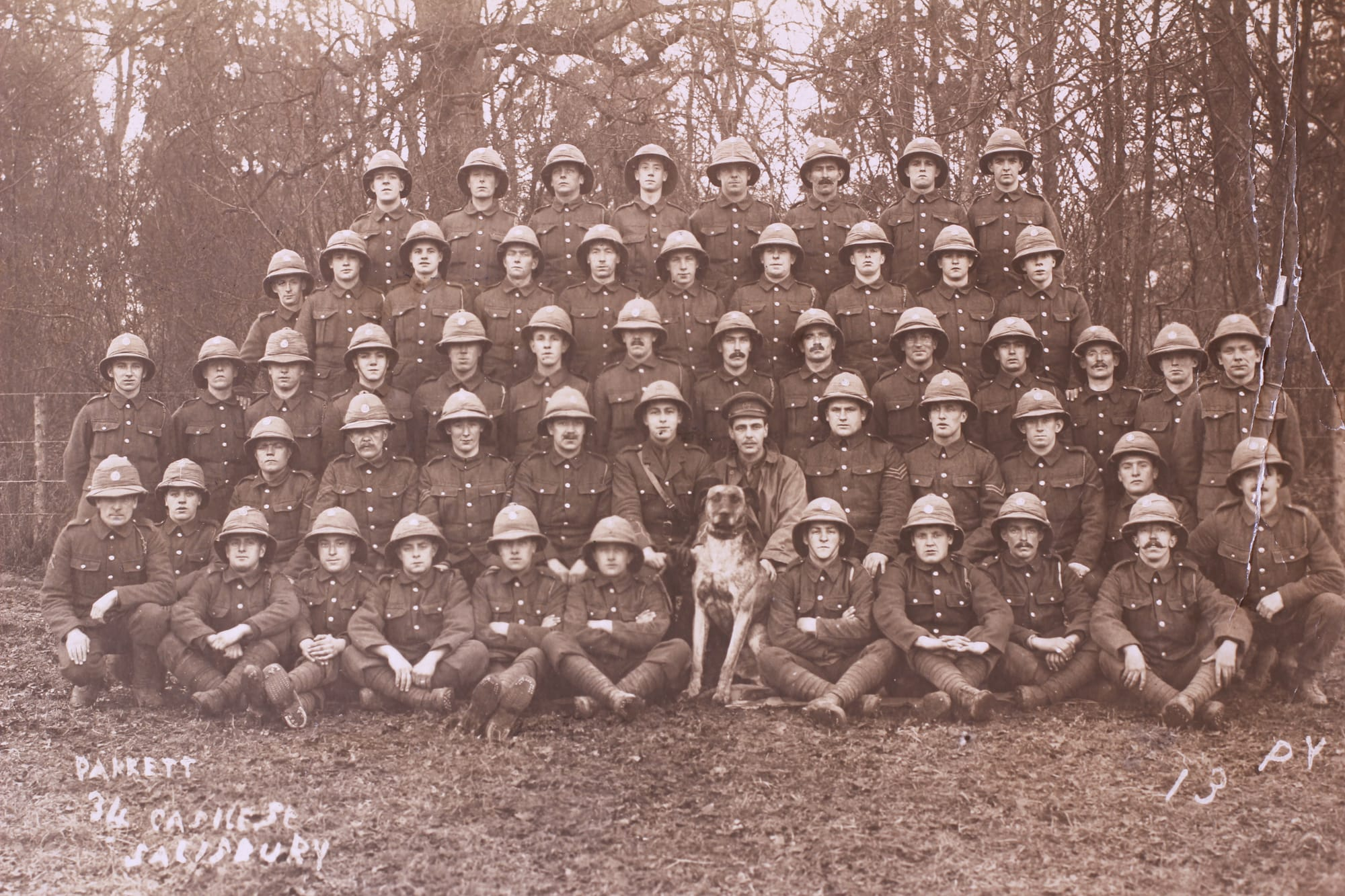
Officers and men of the 14th (Service) Battalion (2nd Barnsley Pals), York and Lancaster Regiment, taken in 1915 whilst at Hurdcott at Salisbury just prior to their departure for Egypt. It can be seen that preparations are underway for their deployment to a hot country as these men are wearing their newly issued Pith helmet.

The rush of Kitchener recruits had overwhelmed the Army's ability to absorb them, so the Pals Battalions (mainly in the Fifth New Army, 'K5') were left for some time in the hands of the recruiting committees. The men of the 1st Barnsleys were billeted at the Public and Arcade Halls and Harvey Institute in town or in their own homes, and food was supplied by the Barnsley British Co-operative Society. Each day, the men paraded in the square in Regent Street, then marched to the Queen's Ground for drill, still in civilian dress until temporary uniforms could be obtained. These were described as a 'blue serge uniform with grass buttons and a little cocked hat', and were worn until khaki uniforms arrived at Easter 1915. A number of retired Regular Army non-commissioned officers (NCOs) were taken on to drill the men. Men from the building and construction trades were sent to work building a hutted camp at New Hall at Silkstone, outside Barnsley. Small batches of obsolete rifles were obtained for training, including Lee–Metfords, Long Lee–Enfields and Canadian Ross rifles. On 10 December the two battalions were designated the 13th (Service) Battalion, York and Lancaster Regiment (1st Barnsley) and 14th (S) Bn Y&L Regiment (2nd Barnsley). The WO assigned them to 115th Brigade of 38th Division, formed of Pals Battalions from across Northern England: the other battalions in the brigade were the Grimsby Chums (10th (S) Battalion, Lincolnshire Regiment) and the Sheffield City Battalion, (12th (S) Bn, Y&L Regiment). On 20 December, the 13th Y&R marched out to Silkstone Camp, where more varied training could begin.

In January 1915, there were concerns that enlistments to the 2nd Barnsleys were slowing down, and a renewed recruitment drive was undertaken. By Easter the 2nd Bn was close to its full establishment, including a 250-strong reserve company, and had outgrown the accommodation at the Public Hall, so D Company was housed in the schoolroom of the Regent Street Congregational Church. In late February 1915, about 50 former coal miners from the 1st Barnsley were seconded to form a nucleus for the new Tunnelling companies of the Royal Engineers (RE), including 171st and 173rd Tunnelling Companies,. These dug the Hill 60 mines near Ypres, fired on 17 April in the first major British mining operation of the war.

In April 1915, the WO converted the Fourth New Army (K4) into reserve units for K1–K3, and the K5 formations took over their numbers: thus 115th Bde became 94th Bde in 31st Division. The new 94th Bde was concentrated in May at Penkridge Bank Camp on Cannock Chase, Staffordshire, where it was joined by the Accrington Pals (11th East Lancashire Regiment) in place of the Grimsby Chums. On 13 May, the 13th Y&L marched into Barnsley from Silkstone and then both battalions entrained for Cannock Chase. Training was stepped up at Penkridge. While there Lt-Col Raley's health broke down, and after a spell under Maj T. Carter Clough of the Sheffield City Battalion, 14th Y&R came under the command of Lt-Col Walter Hulke, a former Regular officer of the Lincolns.

The 31st Division concentrated at South Camp, Ripon, at the end of July 1915, where the Barnsley ex-miners built the rifle range on which the men of the division fired their General Musketry Course. In September, the division moved to Hurdcott Camp, where it carried out final intensive battle training on Salisbury Plain. In November, Lt-Col Hewitt of 13th Y&R resigned, having been graded medically unfit for overseas service. He was replaced by Lt-Col Edmund Wilford, formerly of 30th Lancers (Gordon's Horse) of the Indian Army. Both battalions formed bands before they left Hurdcott, the instruments being supplied by the Raising Committee.

=== 15th (Reserve) Battalion ===
A fifth, reserve or depot company (E Company), was formed in December 1914 to provide reinforcements for the 1st Battalion; this continued to share the crowded Public Hall with the men gathering for the 2nd Bn. The 2nd Bn also formed a depot company, and after the battalions moved to Cannock Chase in April 1915, each formed a second depot company at Silkstone. On 9 June Northern Command ordered the depot companies of the regiments to be concentrated, so E and F Companies of the 12th Y&L (Sheffield) moved into the camp at Silkstone, to join those of the 1st and 2nd Barnsley. In July 1915 the depot companies of all three battalions were formed into 15th (Reserve) Bn, York and Lancaster Regiment. It was part of 21st Reserve Brigade, supporting all the Pals battalions of 31st Division. Its first CO was Lt-Col Raley, formerly of 14th Y&R.

On 1 September 1916, the Local Reserve battalions were transferred to the Training Reserve (TR) and the battalion absorbed 15th (Reserve) Battalion, East Yorkshire Regiment, (reserve to the Hull Pals) to form 91st Training Reserve Battalion, though the training staff retained their regimental badges. This was still in 21st Reserve Bde. It was redesignated 270th (Infantry) Bn, Training Reserve, on 1 July 1917 and joined 219th Bde of 73rd Division at Danbury, Essex, on 9 July. On 1 November 1917, it was transferred to the King's Own Yorkshire Light Infantry (KOYLI) as 52nd (Graduated) Bn. In January 1918 it moved to 208th Bde in 69th Division at Doncaster in West Yorkshire. By May 1918 it was at Welbeck in Nottinghamshire in 207th Bde of 69th Division, and about August 1918 it moved to Clipstone Camp where it remained until the end of the war. After the war it was converted into a service battalion on 8 February 1919 and sent to join the British Army of the Rhine. There it was absorbed into 2/4th Bn, KOYLI, in 1st Midland Infantry Brigade, on 7 April 1919.

== Service ==
=== Egypt ===
On 29 November 1915, 31st Division received warning orders to join the British Expeditionary Force (BEF) in France, and advance parties set out for the embarkation ports of Folkestone and Southampton. At the last minute, the destination was changed to Egypt, the advance parties were recalled, and on 26 December the troops embarked at Devonport, the 13th and 14th Y&L aboard HM Transport Andania, with some men of 14th Y&L working to make up for a shortage of ship's stokers. The Andania reached Port Said on 11 January 1916, where 31st Division had concentrated by 23 January. It then travelled by train to take over No 3 Section of the Suez Canal defences, with the Barnsley battalions at El Ferdan. Here the men underwent training as well as providing working parties for the defences. On 26 February, orders arrived to reverse the process, and the division began re-embarking at Port Said, two companies of 14th Y&L with 12th Y&L aboard HMT Briton on 10 March, the rest of the Barnsley battalions aboard HMT Megantic on 11 March. They unloaded at Marseille on 15–17 March and then joined the division concentrating in the Somme area. They remained on the Western Front for the rest of the war.

31st Division was part of the BEF's concentration of troops in the Somme sector preparing for that summer's 'Big Push', the Battle of the Somme. The ex-miners of the 13th Y&L were employed in assisting the RE tunnelling companies, both in deep mining under the German lines and in digging 'Russian saps' out under No man's land. These were shallow tunnels that could be unroofed to provide ready-made communication trenches forward from the British front line. The battalion provided three shifts of 100 men each day. The rest of the Barnsleys sent parties forwards from their billets at Mailly-Maillet for instruction in Trench warfare by 48th (South Midland) Division and then took responsibility for their own section of line on 3 April. The battalions spent several periods in April–June holding the line in front of Colincamps, suffering their first battle casualties from enemy shellfire and trench raids. Out of the line, they provided working parties to repair damaged trenches and to dig new assembly and communication trenches for the forthcoming offensive. On 5 June, the battalions moved to Gézaincourt for training, including practice assaults by the whole brigade over a mock-up of the German trenches.

=== First day of the Somme ===
Despite all the preparation and high hopes, the First day on the Somme (1 July) was a disaster for 31st Division. Its task was to take the village of Serre and form a defensive flank for the rest of Fourth Army. 94th Brigade moved into its assembly trenches in a line of copses (named 'Matthew', 'Mark', 'Luke' and 'John') in front of Colincamps on 30 June. Positioned on the division's left, 94th Bde was to attack on a two-battalion front with the 12th Y&L (left) and 11th East Lancs (right) leading, followed by a company of the divisional pioneer battalion, the 12th King's Own Yorkshire Light Infantry. The 14th Y&L were to advance behind the left of the 12th Y&L, opening up the Russian saps to establish a trench line up the rising ground to join the captured German trenches with their own jumping-off trenches, thus forming the division's flank. Having been working so much for the REs, the 13th Y&L had had less time for rehearsal and were assigned the role of support behind the 11th East Lancs, A and B Companies to 'mop up' and consolidate the gains, C and D as reserves. Both battalions suffered under the enemy counter-bombardment of the copses and assembly trenches.

The leading waves of 12th Y&L and 11th East Lancs left their trenches at 07.20 when the nearby Hawthorn Ridge mine was exploded, 10 minutes before Zero. They then laid down in No man's land about 100 yards (91 m) in front of the trenches while the final intensive bombardment of the enemy positions was fired. Thus alerted, the enemy put down their own artillery barrage on the British line, and their machine gun teams came out of their dugouts. When the two leading waves set off at 07.30, followed by the third and fourth emerging from the trenches, they were almost annihilated by German fire. The 12th Y&L was hit in its left flank from German trenches that were not being attacked, and which had not been adequately screened by a planned smokescreen: many did not even reach the German barbed wire. A Company of 14th Y&L on the extreme left also suffered heavy casualties trying to get out of their battered assembly trenches into No man's land. When others of the battalion reached the head of their Russian sap they found themselves isolated beyond the German wire that held up the 12th Y&L. On the right some of the leading two waves of the 11th East Lancs, followed by two platoons of 13th Y&L as 'moppers-up', got into the German positions, and some of the Accrington men and perhaps of the 12th Y&L may have reached Serre: if this was the case nothing was ever heard from them again, but later in the war bodies of men from the battalions were recovered from this area. The survivors from the leading waves took what shelter they could in shellholes in No man's land and exchanged fire with the Germans. Shortly after 08.00, B Company of 13th Y&L crossed the front line but were also badly mauled in trying to reach the 11th East Lancs in the German trenches. C and D Companies of 13th Y&L also left their assembly trenches at 09.00 to support the 11th East Lancs, but most of them did not even reach the front British trench.

With heavy shellfire falling on the chaotic jumping-off trenches, the attack was suspended. At about 10.00 Lt-Col Hulke sent forward reinforcements for the 14th Y&L party opening up the Russian saps, but they found nothing – the saps had been destroyed by shellfire and no survivors could be found. By noon the sector was quiet apart from occasional shelling and sniping at the men pinned down in No man's land. Although a fresh attack was ordered for the afternoon, the divisional commander and the commanders of 93rd and 94th Bdes concluded that neither brigade was fit for any further offensive operation. C and D Companies of 14th Y&L took over defence of the front line from the survivors of the 12th Y&L. There were persistent reports that men of 12th Y&L were still holding out in the German front line and during the night the battalion borrowed some men from 14th Y&L to go out on patrol from Mark Copse. They got as far as the German wire, but found no fighting going on ahead, while the wounded and unwounded survivors assured them that anyone still in the German trenches was a casualty. During the night those men in No man's land who were able slipped back to their own line; for a time next day, the Germans allowed stretcher-bearers to remove casualties from No man's land. The Sheffield City Battalion and Accrington Pals in the lead had suffered most severely, but of the 1442 men of the two Barnsley battalions that had gone over the top in their support, 175 officers and men had been killed outright and 392 wounded, of whom 35 later died of their wounds. (The 1st Barnsley Pals suffered 275 casualties on 1 July 1916 while the 2nd Barnsley Pals suffered 270.)

The shattered 31st Division was pulled out and sent to the quiet Neuve-Chapelle sector for rest and refit. Both Barnsley battalions went back into the line on 15 July, but were short of men: the 13th Y&L mustered 15 officers and 469 other ranks (ORs) when it arrived at Neuve-Chappelle, and suffered another 48 casualties during a 12-day spell in the trenches. 94th Brigade organised composite companies from the battalions out of the line to reinforce the one holding the line up to adequate strength. The 11th East Lancs and 12th Y&L combined with a company of the 13th Y&L formed a single battalion for one spell of trench duty, until a reinforcement draft arrived for the East Lancs and the Barnsley company could be withdrawn. The Barnsley battalions were each still about 300 men understrength at the end of August. Nevertheless, they took their turns to carry out trench raids. On 16 September the division moved into the Festubert sector, before being withdrawn for rest and training in early October.

=== Ancre ===
The Somme Offensive was still continuing when 31st Division returned to the sector on 8 October. 13th Y&L was billeted in Sarton, 14th Y&L returned to Gezaincourt. Between 13 and 21 October they received large drafts of 'Derby men – 169 to the 13th, 249 to the 14th. Although these men strengthened the units numerically, they diluted the Barnsley character of the battalions. From 18 October the battalions took their places in the line in front of Colincamps and in John Copse, now thick with mud. For the Battle of the Ancre, which was to be the last big operation of the year, 31st Division made another attempt to capture Serre on 13 November, but 94th Bde was still not fit for active operations and although standing by it was not employed except to rescue the wounded. The battalions continued to hold the trenches in front of Serre during the winter, carrying out occasional raids, and having many men evacuated to hospital suffering from Trench foot. However fresh drafts kept them up to a strength: the 13th Y&L numbered 26 officers and 946 ORs at New Year. The division was rested from 12 January to 7 February 1917, and the troops underwent training.

In late February 1917, the Germans began withdrawing to the Hindenburg Line (Operation Alberich). They disappeared from the Ancre Front on 24 February, and the 31st Division was ordered to send out strong patrols the next day to regain touch with them. These patrols entered Serre, and over following days the division's advanced guards continued forwards, skirmishing with German rearguards and dealing with booby-traps. The Barnsley battalions passed Gommecourt Wood, scene of bitter fighting on 1 July 1916, and worked their way to Puisieux by 9 March, engaging the enemy in patrol actions until 12 March, when 31st Division was squeezed out as British units converged on the shorter Hindenburg Line. It was then held in readiness for an operation but was not called upon, and on 19 March the division began a six-day march to join First Army north of Arras.

Oppy Wood, 1917. Evening, by John Nash.

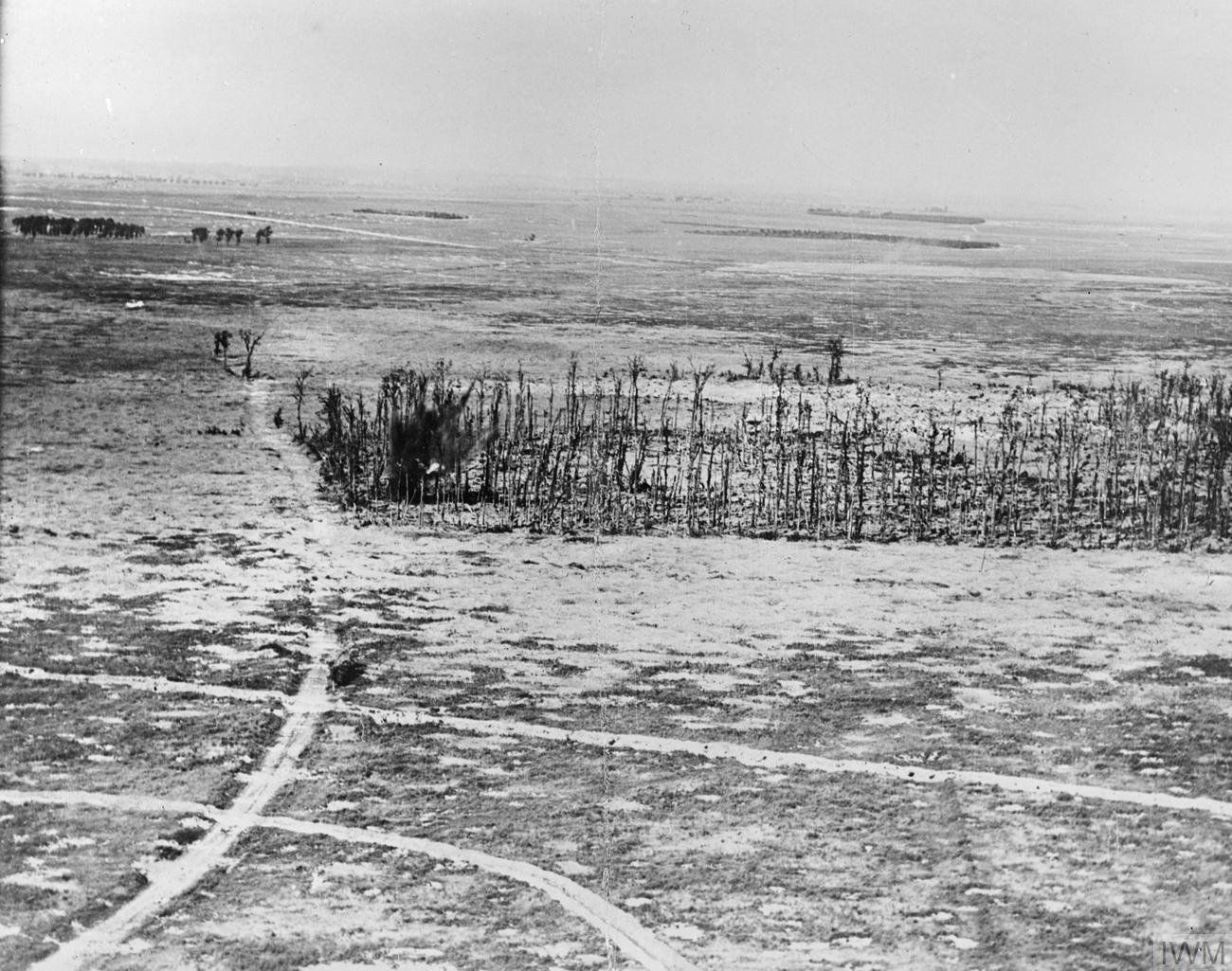
Oppy Wood, from the air.

=== Arras ===
On 9 April First Army captured Vimy Ridge, and next day 31st Division moved up in case it was required for exploitation as the Arras Offensive developed. However it was not brought into the line until 1 May, and next day the 13th Y&L moved into the reserve trenches and provided working parties. On 3 May, 31st Division attacked towards Oppy in the Third Battle of the Scarpe, but of 94th Bde only the 12th Y&L was engaged. On the night of 4/5 May the Barnsley battalions relieved the Bradford Pals (16th and 18th West Yorkshire Regiment) of 93rd Bde in the support trenches near Gavrelle Windmill, and began digging a communication trench up the Windmill Spur to the chain of shellholes that constituted the new front line. Shelling was continuous, and casualties mounted. Lieutenant-Col Wilford of 13th Y&L was wounded when a shell hit the Battalion HQ dugout, and Maj F.J. Courtenay-Hood of 14th Y&L took temporary command. The task of getting supplies, particularly water, to the front line involved a great deal of dangerous work. The battalions were rotated between front, support and reserve trenches until 19 May when they were pulled out for rest, 14th Y&R having lost nearly 150 men. At the beginning of June Lt-Col G.B. Wauhope arrived to take over command of 13th Y&L, while Maj Courtenay-Hood went to command 12th Y&L.

31st Division remained in the area after the Arras offensive ended. Late in June First Army began a series of feint attacks to draw attention away from the Ypres Salient where the BEF was planning a new offensive. First Army gave the impression of preparing for large-scale attacks on Hill 70 and Oppy. In fact the attack on Oppy and Gavrelle, carried out by 94th Bde and 15th Bde of 5th Division on 28 June was in the nature of a carefully-planned large-scale raid, though with the intention of retaining the limited objectives set for it. As a feint, it was important that the enemy should be expecting the attack, and they bombarded the packed jumping-off trenches at 17.30. Despite the 200 casualties they had suffered, the two brigades waited until the British barrage came down suddenly at Zero (19.10) then advanced so quickly across No man's land that the German defensive barrage fell behind them. The British covering artillery was so powerful that the assaulting troops met little resistance, taking Gavrelle Mill and Oppy Wood with very few casualties. The leading waves of 13th Y&L were into the German front line within 5 minutes of going 'over the top'. The troops then dug in. and consolidated through the night, 14th Y&L being well established in 'Cairo Alley' by 01.00. There was no counter-attack: in fact the Germans fell back almost 1 mile (1.6 km), expecting a deeper penetration. For their part in the Capture of Oppy Wood the 12th, 13th and 14th battalions won the Battle honour 'Oppy' for the York and Lancasters.

Afterwards, 31st Division went to rest behind Vimy Ridge. When Canadian Corps moved away, XIII Corps took over defence of the ridge, and 31st Division spent the rest of the year defending this sector, constantly working to improve the defences and losing casualties to German shelling and Mustard gas bombardments, and in raids. In December the division was under orders to move to join the Battle of Cambrai, but the fighting there died down and the order was cancelled.

=== Reorganisation ===
By the beginning of 1918 the BEF was suffering a manpower crisis. Brigades were reduced from four to three battalions each, and the remainder were broken up to provide reinforcements for the others. In fact, in 31st Division 94th Bde was broken up entirely. Between 11 and 17 February the two Barnsley Pals battalions were combined as the 13th Y&L, and also absorbed 15 officers and 300 ORs from the disbanded Sheffield City Battalion. Remaining men from the 14th Y&L went to the 4th Entrenching Battalion or the Hallamshire Battalion (1/5th Y&L). The reconstituted 13th Y&L joined 93rd Bde, alongside the Leeds Pals of 15th/17th West Yorkshire Regiment and the 1st Durham County battalion, the 18th Durham Light Infantry.

=== Spring offensive ===
When the German spring offensive opened on 21 March 1918, 31st Division was in GHQ Reserve and was immediately sent by ex-London buses to assist Third Army. On the night of 22/23 March it reinforced VI Corps and 93rd Bde went up to Boiry-Saint-Martin, south of Arras, where it carried out a partial relief of 34th Division. 34th Division had been forced back to the rear of its Battle Zone, but there was little activity on 23 March. Only two minor attacks were made on the extreme left in the morning and afternoon, and both were repulsed by 13th Y&L. Heavier fighting had been going on further south round Mory, and during the night of 23/24 March 93rd Bde sideslipped about 1,000 yards (910 m) in that direction, taking up position in a 'switch' line north of the River Sensée. Here it was strongly attacked from about 07.00 to 12.00, though the Germans were enfiladed by the Guards Division to the north and were unable to make any progress. Another fierce attack came in at 15.00, but this also broke down, although the rest of 31st Division further south was broken up into groups trying to form a defensive flank. Pressure continued in the south during 25 March, but an attack on 93rd Bde about 13.00 was broken up by artillery and no Germans got near the line. However, the German breakthrough to the south forced VI Corps to wheel 31st Division back to a new switch line that night. At daybreak on 26 March it was discovered that a 1,500 yards (1,400 m) gap had opened up between 31st and Guards Divisions: 13th Y&L and 18th DLI of 93rd Bde, which should have occupied the space, had been ordered to fall further back by the acting Brigade major, who had been disorientated by the effects of a near-miss by a shell. The two missing battalions had gone back 2 miles (3.2 km) to the Purple Line, and Moyenneville was left undefended. While the Guards and 15th/17th West Yorks extended their lines to cover part of the gap, the two battalions were recalled. Preceded by a reconnaissance party they tried to advance into the gap in daylight. However, the Germans had pushed into Moyenneville and occupied the ridge behind, their machine guns forcing the 13th Y&L and 18th DLI to halt and dig in 1,000 yards (910 m) short of the village. Although the 15th/17th West Yorks carried out a successful counter-attack, forcing the enemy off the ridge and out of Moyenneville, the Germans attacked the village again at 12.30 in greater strength and with artillery support. 15th/17th West Yorks fell back to the village edge. The battalion together with 13th Y&L was ordered to launch a counter-attack at 20.30, but the exhausted West Yorks requested a delay. Fresh orders were given for 13th Y&L and 18th DLI to advance under cover of darkness and dig in as close to the village as possible. These orders arrived so late that dawn was breaking as the two battalions approached the village, and they fell back to their position of the previous morning, while 15th/17th West Yorks reinforced by a company of 2nd Irish Guards clung on round the west of Moyenneville. From 11.00 on 27 March the Germans 'dribbled' infantry forward to maintain a continuous attack against 31st Division. Fighting with grenade and bayonet went on for over 5 hours until 92nd Bde withdrew in the evening mist. 93rd Brigade conformed, and though both were under fire for the first 500 yards (460 m)the retirement was made in good order through 4th Guards Bde. The remnant of 15th/17th West Yorks was taken out of action while the 13th Y&L and part of 18th DLI went into the line alongside 4th Gds Bde, which was now well-entrenched. Three final attacks by the Germans next day (28 March) were repelled from these trenches with heavy casualties. The Germans advanced in full marching order with little artillery support and were simply shot down: later they were seen fleeing in all directions. Although fighting continued, the main weight of the German offensive had switched to the Arras sector, and 31st Division could be relieved during the nights of 30/31 March and 31 March/1 April. By then 13th Y&L's casualties amounted to some 400 men.

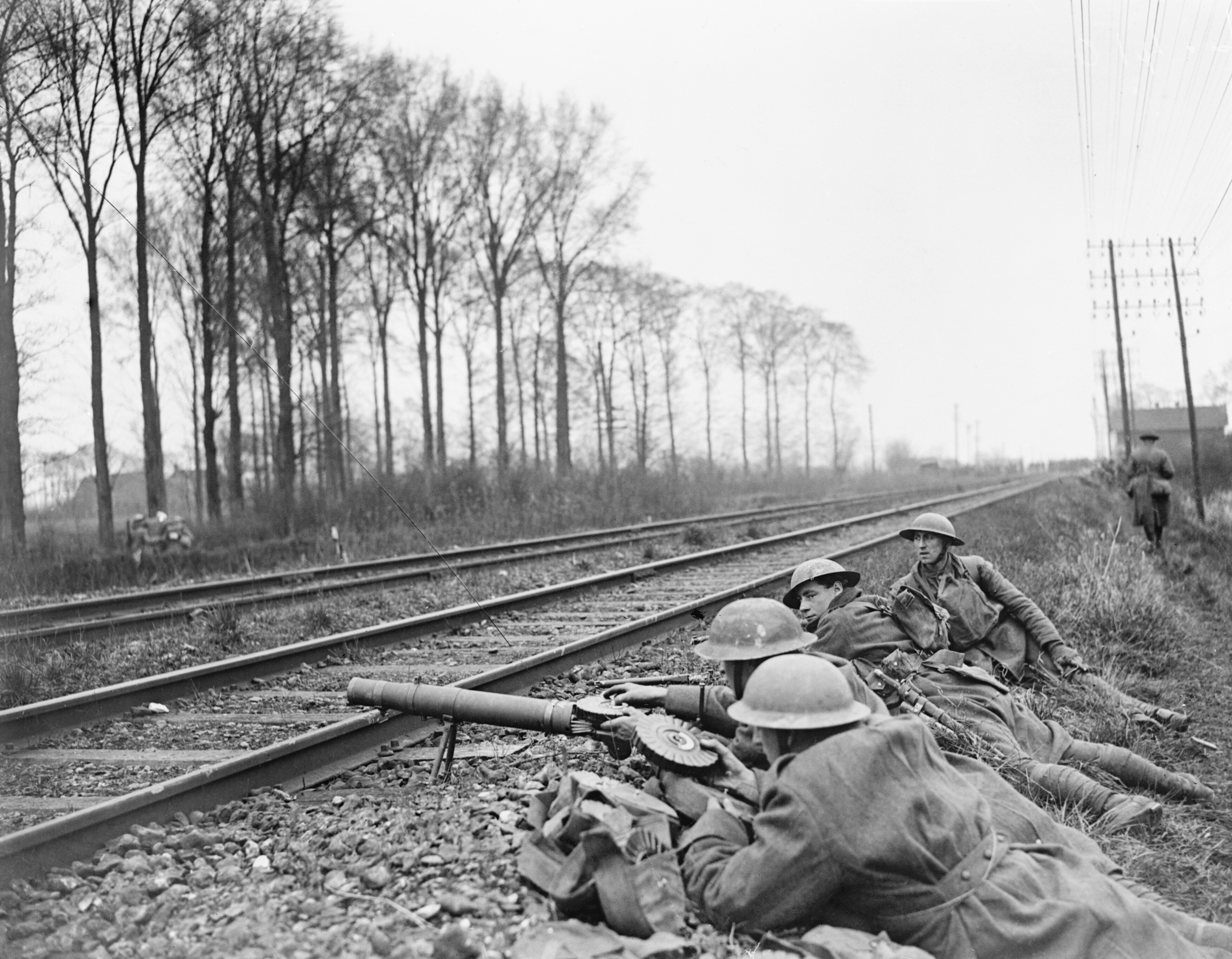
Lewis Gun team of 31st Division near Merris, 12 April 1918.

31st Division was then sent north to the quiet sector behind First Army where it went into reserve. It received large numbers of reinforcements, but these were mainly CategoryA4: under the age of 19 who would not previously have been eligible for active service. However, the rest was brief: the second phase of the he German offensive (the Battles of the Lys) was about to open against First Army. The bombardment opened on 7 April, and on 11 April the division was called forward in buses to form a defensive line near Estaires through which retreating British and Portuguese troops could withdraw. 93rd Brigade was ordered forward from its position at Outtersteene to support 40th Division, but patrols brought back word that the enemy had penetrated 40th Division's thin line and were at La Becque. 93rd Brigade's orders were cancelled, and it was instead ordered to counter-attack La Becque. Although the brigade was supported by one and a half companies of 31st Machine Gun Bn there was virtually no artillery available, so it was decided to dispense with any artillery preparation and deliver a surprise attack. Delivered by 13th Y&L and 18th DLI at dusk (19.00) this was entirely successful, not only recapturing La Becque but regaining 40th Division's line and re-establishing touch with the formations on either flank. Next day the adjacent formations were able to pivot back on the firmly established 31st Division, while the Germans threw in all their reserves to try to take Hazebrouck. However, between 07.00 and 08.00, the Germans penetrated between 92nd and 93rd Bdes and inflicted heavy casualties with enfilade fire. About 12.00 the brigades began a slow withdrawal from one hedge to the next. As they fell back towards Merris a 3 miles (4.8 km) gap opened up on their left flank. Luckily, 33rd Division was able to fill the gap, mainly with machine gunners, pioneers, engineers and cyclists. Next day (13 April) a mixed force covered Hazebrouck, with 93rd Bde in reserve at Méteren. Although weak, these troops covered the detrainment at Hazebrouck of 1st Australian Division, who took over the line and drove back the enemy attacks on 14 April. By now 13th Y&L consisted of just 6 officers and 134 ORs.

=== La Becque ===
By now 31st was one of the weakest divisions in the BEF. On 16 April 92nd and 93rd Bdes were temporarily amalgamated as '92nd Composite Bde' under the command of Brig-Gen O. de L. Williams of 92nd Bde, with the 13th Y&L and 11th East Lancs forming '94th Composite Bn'. However, the brigades and battalions resumed their separate identities on 18 April, before going back into the line alongside the Australians for a while. 31st Division was then scheduled to be reduced to a cadre and its units broken up to provide reinforcements to others, but in the end, this was not done, and it remained in reserve. Over the following weeks it received reinforcements (though many were under 19), and it began to take its turn holding the line, in front of the Forêt de Nieppe, facing La Becque farm.

In May and June the brigades took turns out of the line training for offensive operations. 31st and 5th Divisions took part in Operation Borderland, a limited attack on La Becque and other fortified farms in front of the Forest of Nieppe on 28 June, in what was described as 'a model operation' for artillery cooperation. The forest screened the assembly of troops and material, and the artillery fired practice barrages each morning to mislead the enemy. Two companies of 13th Y&L were taken out of the line on 22 June to practise for the attack, then they used the cover of the forest to seize Ankle Farm on the night of 26/27 June. On 28 June the 13th Y&L and 18th DLI held the line while 15th/17th West Yorks carried out a surprise attack that took the German positions with only light casualties.

=== Hundred Days Offensive ===
Individual units continued to make small advances through aggressive patrolling and seizing strongpoints (so-called 'peaceful penetration') and this accelerated when the Allies launched a coordinated offensive on 8 August (the Hundred Days Offensive). The division captured Vieux-Berquin on 13 August 1918 and pushed forward until running into serious opposition south of Ploegsteert on 21 August, where fighting continued into September.

Second Army carried out a formal attack on the morning of 28 September (the Fifth Battle of Ypres) and 31st Division was ordered to watch for opportunities and take advantage of enemy weakening. 92nd Brigade attacked at 15.00. Although there was no surprise and considerable enemy shelling of the back areas, the operation went well. 93rd Brigade was then ordered to cross the Douve stream accompanied by artillery and engineers. With the onset of darkness and the congestion. of the roads, the advanced guard only reached the starting point at 21.00, and the main body at 10.30. As it came over Hill 63 the brigade came under heavy and accurate shellfire and had to open out. After a halt of about an hour, it resumed its advance and met no opposition for 2 miles (3.2 km). It then met Germans rearguards at Ash Crater and its advance was slowed by machine gun fire, but after a little resistance in some pillboxes the enemy withdrew methodically. In the darkness the leading battalion found itself advancing with German units about 500 yards (460 m) away on both flanks, marching in the same direction. The brigade was halted on the Warneton–Comines road at about 05.00 on 29 September. In the afternoon 31st Division was ordered to move up to the line of the River Lys, but 93rd Bde was judged to be too tired after its night march and the advance was carried out next day as the Germans retired over the Lys near Warneton. This was the Barnsley Pals' last engagement and cost the battalion 12 killed, 49 wounded (including the CO, Lt-Col Wauchope) and 2 missing. Afterwards the battalion went into divisional reserve, where it remained while 31st Division forced a crossing of the Lys on the night of 14/15 October and fought the action of Tieghem on 31 October. The battalion was still in reserve at Renaix when the Armistice with Germany came into effect on 11 November 1918.

== Disbandment ==
The division began to pull back on 13 November and, by the end of the month, was established in camps south of St-Omer and engaged in road repair. Demobilisation (chiefly of coal miners) began on 11 December and proceeded at a steadily increasing rate during early 1919. By May the battalions had been reduced to cadres: 13th Y&L consisted of 4 officers and 36 ORs on 9 May. The division ceased to exist on 20 May and the cadre sailed from Dunkirk aboard the SS Moelieff next day, arriving at Southampton on 22 May. The cadre was sent to Catterick Camp for final demobilisation. On 29 May the cadre travelled to Barnsley to deposit the battalion colour in St Mary's Parish Church. Some 900 former members of the Barnsley Pals, many disabled by wounds, paraded on the Queen's Ground and were inspected by Lt-Col Sir Joseph Hewitt and Col William Raley.

During the war 31st Division's casualties amounted to 30,091 killed, wounded, and missing, of which the Barnsley battalions had suffered the following fatal casualties (other ranks only):

- 13th Y&L: 475
- 14th Y&L: 324

== Commanders ==
The following served as commanding officers of the Barnsley Pals:

13th York & Lancasters (1st Barnsley)

- Lt-Col Joseph Hewitt, September 1914–November 1915
- Lt-Col Edmund Wilford (Indian Army), November 1915, wounded May 1917
- Maj F.J. Courtenay-Hood (14th Y&L), acting May–June 1917
- Lt-Col G.B. Wauhope, June 1917, wounded 30 September 1918

14th York & Lancasters (2nd Barnsley)

- Lt-Col William Raley, December 1914–July 1915
- Lt-Col Walter Hulke (Lincolnshire Regiment), July 1915–disbandment

15th (Reserve) Bn, York & Lancasters

- Lt-Col William Raley, July 1915

== Insignia ==
The first pattern of 31st Division's formation sign.

As well as the Y&L cap badge, with the Bengal tiger (for the original 65th Foot) surmounted by a Tudor rose (for both counties) and ducal coronet (for the Duchy of Lancaster), both battalions would have worn brass or embroidered 'Y.&L.' titles on the shoulder straps. They also wore the 94th Brigade cloth sign of a square divided red-over-white, worn on the back beneath the collar, with a circle underneath (or possibly on each arm), which was yellow for the 13th Bn, mid-blue for the 14th Bn. Some members of 13th Bn also wore these signs painted on their helmets. After 31st Division was reorganised in February 1918, 13th Bn moved to 93rd Bde, whose sign was a square divided diagonally, white upper right, red lower left, worn on the back beneath the collar. In addition, all ranks wore a horizontal rectangle on both arms divided green over yellow over blue, those being the colours of the three Y&L Pals battalions before amalgamation.

The original formation sign of 31st Division was a design with triangles and vertical lines (see picture). This was replaced in 1917 with overlapping York (white) and Lancaster (red) roses on right and left respectively; Yorkshire-based regiments such as the Y&L wore this with the white overlapping the red.

== Memorials ==
Sheffield Memorial Park outside the village of Serre was opened in 1936. It comprises the woodland of the 'Mark', 'Luke' and 'John' copses from which the 94th Bde 'jumped off' on 1 July 1916, and retains outlines of trenches and shellholes. As well as the memorial to the Sheffield City Battalion, others have been added, including one to the Barnsley Pals. It comprises a black stone monument that was unveiled in 1998.

The York & Lancaster Regiment War Memorial is in Weston Park, Sheffield. It consists of a stone obelisk surmounted by a bronze winged figure of Victory and flanked by bronze figures of an officer and a private. It was unveiled on 7 July 1923 by the regimental colonel, Field Marshal Viscount Plumer.

The colours of both battalions are held at St Mary's Church in Barnsley.
