= Obelisk to Lady Mary Wortley Montagu =

Obelisk to Lady Mary Wortley Montagu (Sun Monument)
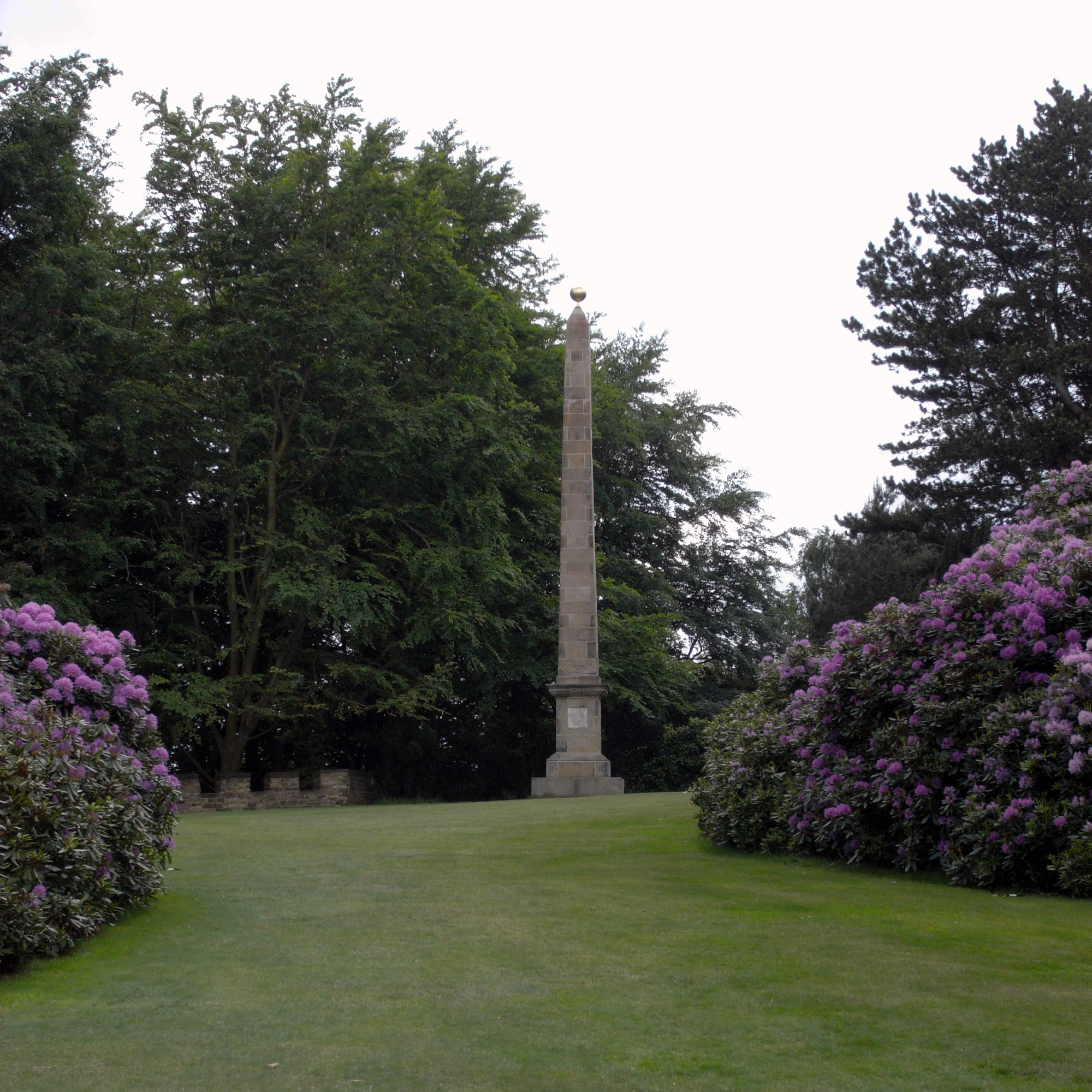

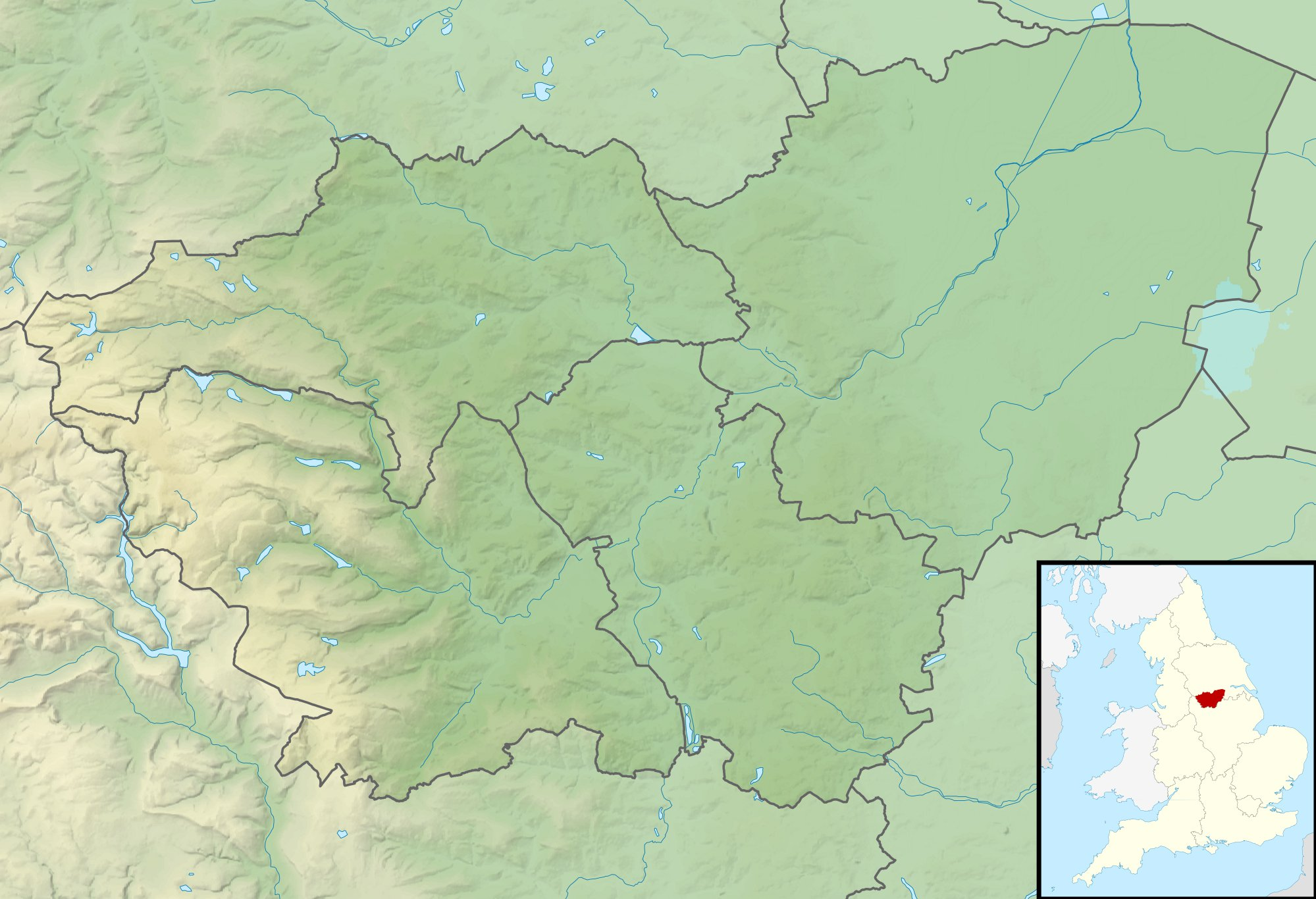
- Location within South Yorkshire
- 53.522°N 1.52346°W
- Type: Memorial
- Location: Wentworth Castle, Stainborough, South Yorkshire

History
- Built: c.1736

Site notes
- Governing body: National Trust

Listed Building – Grade II*
- Official name: Obelisk to Lady Mary Wortley Montagu (Sun Monument)
- Designated: 30 November 2023
- Reference no.: 1151068

The Obelisk to Lady Mary Wortley Montagu (or The Sun Monument) is a memorial, dating from c.1736, to Lady Mary Wortley Montagu. It stands in the grounds of Wentworth Castle, Stainborough, South Yorkshire. It is a Grade II* listed structure. Raised by William Wentworth, 2nd Earl of Strafford, it is the only known garden feature created in 18th century England which celebrates "the intellectual achievements of a woman".

== History ==
TO THE MEMORY OF THE
RT HON LADY MARY
WORTLEY MONTAGU
WHO IN THE YEAR 1720
INTRODUCED INOCULATION
OF THE SMALLPOX
INTO ENGLAND FROM TURKEY

— Memorial inscription

Lady Mary Wortley Montagu (1689-1762) was an English writer. Born the eldest child of Evelyn Pierrepont, 1st Duke of Kingston-upon-Hull, in 1712 she eloped and married Edward Wortley Montagu. On his appointment as ambassador to the Ottoman Empire in 1716, Lady Mary travelled with him to Turkey. She had contracted smallpox the previous year and, having previously lost family and friends to the disease, became greatly interested in the practice of inoculation, then widely undertaken in Turkey but virtually unknown in England, eventually having her five-year old son inoculated. On the Montagus’ return to England in 1719, she continued the practice of inoculating her own children, and encouraged her family and friends to follow suit; the practice became widely adopted and remained England’s primary response to smallpox until Edward Jenner’s successful experiments with cowpox in 1798. Lady Mary died of cancer in 1762.

William Wentworth, 2nd Earl of Strafford was an admirer of Lady Mary, his estate of Wentworth Castle, bordering her husband's at Wortley Hall in South Yorkshire. It is also possible that they met in Italy, where Lady Mary lived for long periods and which Wentworth visited as a young man. Following his father, Strafford devoted considerable time and expense to the embellishment of his house, and the beautifying of his estate and, at some point between 1730 and 1746 the obelisk was raised as a terminating feature at the junction of two avenues within the garden. There is uncertainty as to the exact date, and as to under which earl it was built. Historic England, citing contemporary records and illustrations, gives the date range of 1730 to 1746. The first earl died in 1739, his son succeeding. Ruth Harman, in her 2017 revision of Yorkshire West Riding: Sheffield and the South, in the Pevsner Buildings of England series, suggests that the obelisk was erected "by 1746", and that its original title was the Sun Monument, owing to a representation of the sun and its rays which featured at its top. (Note: There is further uncertainty as to the meaning of the Sun Monument name. This may be a punning reference to the first earl's "son", or to Charles Edward Stuart, "son" of the Old Pretender, the first earl being a staunch Jacobite.)

The dedication to Lady Mary was certainly the inspiration of the second earl. It is the only known such dedication of an 18th-century English garden feature to celebrate "the intellectual achievements of a woman". The monument was given a Grade II listing in 1968. In 2023 this was upgraded to II*, in recognition of the monument's importance and rarity as a memorial to a non-Royal woman which recognised her activities and influence.

== Architecture and description ==
An 18th century record suggests that the model for the obelisk was a Roman original, which stood in the Porta del Popolo in Rome. It is built of sandstone ashlar and tapers to a pyramidal point. This was originally enhanced by a depiction of the sun, but this was lost some time in the 20th century. (Note: Local tradition ascribes the removal to soldiers billeted at Wentworth Castle during World War II.) The present disc is a replacement, installed in 2008. The obelisk carries two inscriptions, [see box]. The original dedicatory plaque bears a cypher, the letter S, a mark used by the second earl but not by the first. The second plaque is a modern substitute, replicating the text of the, now-illegible, first inscription.

== Gallery ==
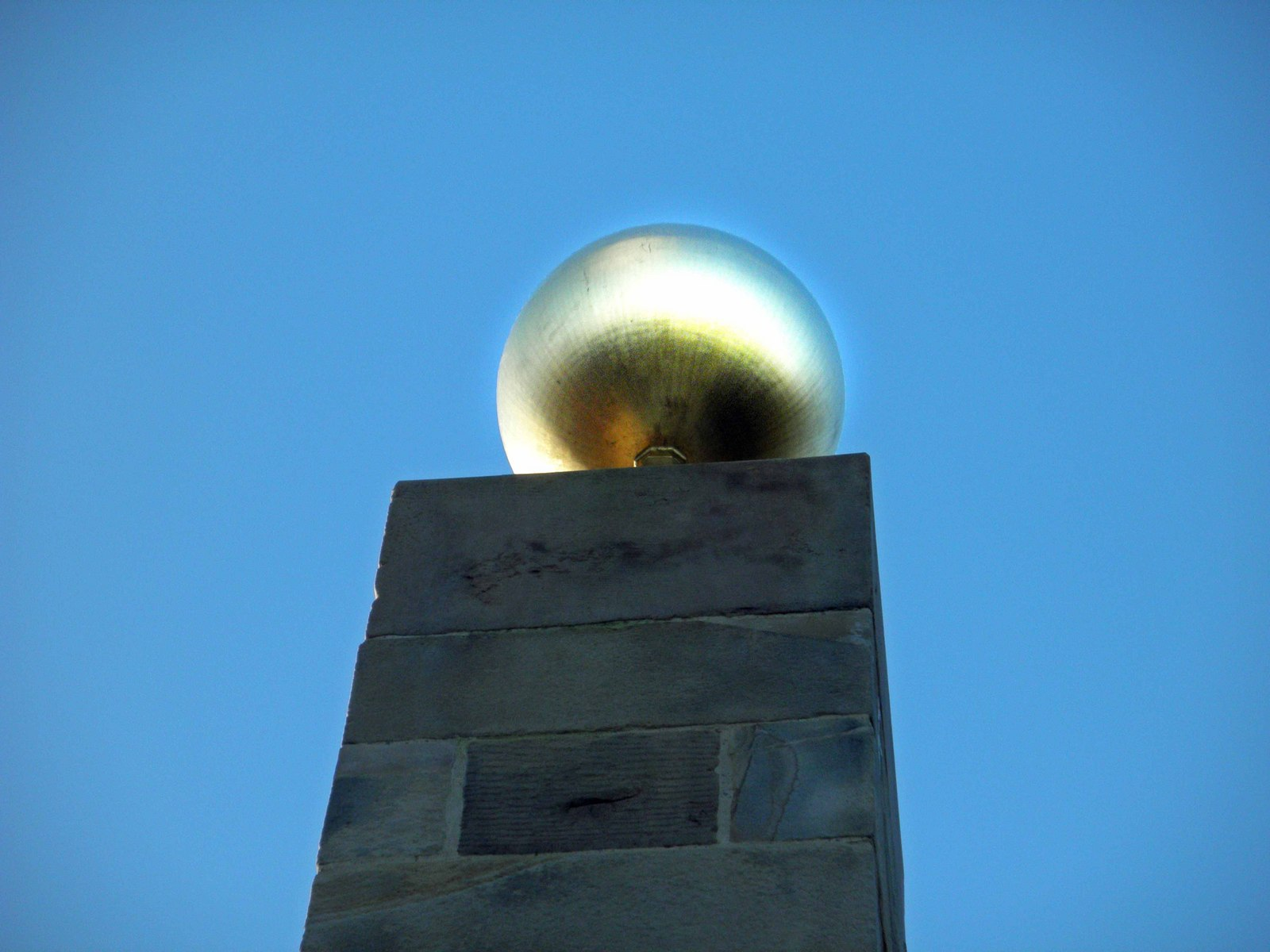
The re-instated and re-designed finial

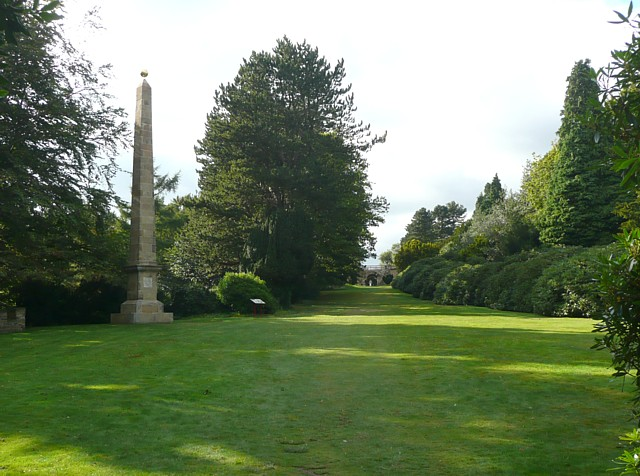
An oblique view

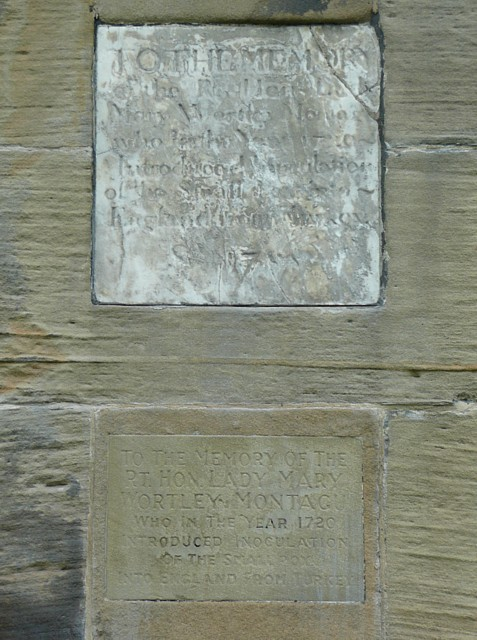
Plaques on the monument

== Sources ==
- Charlesworth, Michael (2002). The Gothic Revival 1720–1870 – Literary Sources and Documents: Blood and Ghosts. Vol. 1. Robertsbridge, East Sussex: Helm Information. ISBN 978-1-873-40367-9. OCLC 491489502.
- Grundy, Isobel (23 September 2004). "Montagu, Lady Mary Wortley [née Lady Mary Pierrepont] (bap. 1689, d. 1762), writer". Oxford Dictionary of National Biography.
- Harman, Ruth; Pevsner, Nikolaus (2017). Yorkshire West Riding: Sheffield and the South. The Buildings of England. New Haven, US and London: Yale University Press. ISBN 978-0-300-22468-9.
