= Silkstone glassworks =

Historic site in South Yorkshire, England

Coordinates: 53.54826°N 1.55978°W

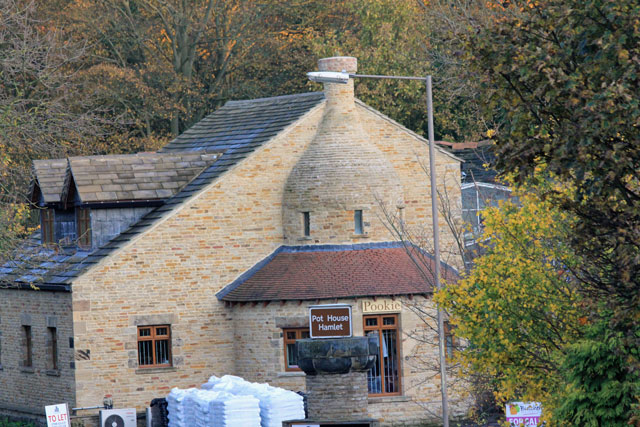
A view of part of the site of the old glassworks

Silkstone glassworks is situated at Pot House Hamlet, a historic former industrial site in Silkstone, South Yorkshire, England. A glass works was established at Silkstone around 1659 by John Pilmey, who had emigrated from France some years earlier. The glassworks had two furnaces, one for green glass and the other for white.

Pilmey married Abigail Scott at Silkstone in 1658. Later she was one of the signatories who successfully petitioned Parliament against the Glass Tax in 1696. Her death is recorded on William Scott's gravestone in the North Aisle of Silkstone Church.

In 1718, John Warburton, when preparing his map of Yorkshire, noted as he passed Silkstone Church "pass a rill at the bottom the glass house on the right."

The remains of the glassworks and pottery were excavated by English Heritage in 2003, and the site was subsequently protected as a scheduled monument.

Pot House Hamlet now consists of a number of independent small businesses.
