= Listed buildings in Stainborough =

Stainborough is a civil parish in the metropolitan borough of Barnsley, South Yorkshire, England. The parish contains 33 listed buildings that are recorded in the National Heritage List for England. Of these, one is listed at Grade I, the highest of the three grades, eight are at Grade II*, the middle grade, and the others are at Grade II, the lowest grade. The parish contains the former country house, Wentworth Castle, which is listed at Grade I, its gardens and grounds, and Stainborough Park, which contain most of the buildings in the list. These include buildings associated with the house, Home Farm and its farm buildings, monuments and a statue, a church, a bridge, and follies. Outside these areas, the listed buildings are farmhouses, farm buildings, a public house, and a schoolroom converted into dwellings.

== Key ==
Grade	Criteria
I	Buildings of exceptional interest, sometimes considered to be internationally important
II*	Particularly important buildings of more than special interest
II	Buildings of national importance and special interest

== Buildings ==
Name and location	Photograph	Date	Notes	Grade
Barn, Falthwaite Grange Farm; 53.52502°N 1.54121°W		16th century (probable)	The barn is timber framed, the lower part later encased in sandstone, and the upper part with brick infill. The roof is in slate, there is a single storey, and five bays. On each front is a central wagon entry, and on the front facing the road are two hatches.	II
Round Green Farmhouse; 53.52546°N 1.49862°W	—	16th century	The farmhouse, that was extended in the 18th and 19th centuries, is in sandstone with a roof of slate and some tile. There is an irregular plan, with a front range of two storeys and an attic, and four bays, an earlier rear wing on the left, and a curving wing on the right. The front range contains a doorway with a fanlight and sash windows. In the right wing is an archway with a quoined surround, a gabled, dated bellcote, and sash windows and half-dormers. On the left wing are external steps.	II
Cowhouse, Falthwaite Grange Farm; 53.52513°N 1.54079°W	—	16th or early 17th century	The cowhouse is timber framed, and was later encased in sandstone, with some brick infill. There is a single storey and three bays. On the front are doorways and casement windows, in the right return external steps lead up to a doorway, and in the gable is a pigeon hole.	II
Wentworth Castle; 53.52430°N 1.51879°W		1670–72	A country house, later an educational college, the east wing was added in 1710–20, and the south front in about 1760. It is built in sandstone, the original block has a stone slate roof, and the later roofs are in lead. The original house has three storeys, attic and basements, and a double-pile, the east wing is in Baroque style, and the extensions to the south and west are Palladian. The east wing has three storeys, 15 bays, and giant Corinthian pilasters. The south front has two storeys and a basement, 13 bays, and a balustraded parapet. In the centre is a pediment containing carving, on six giant Corinthian columns, and the outer bays contain Venetian windows.	I
Barn at Home Farm and wall 53.52529°N 1.51828°W	—	c. 1715 (probable)	The barn is in sandstone, with quoins, stone gutter brackets, and a Welsh slate roof with gable copings and shaped kneelers. There are two storeys and six internal bays, and at the north end is a later boiler house. The barn contains wagon entrances with segmental arches, and chamfered and quoined surrounds, doorways, including an upper floor doorway approached by wooden steps, and windows of various types, including three oculi. The yard is enclosed by a coped wall with gate piers that have bands and pyramidal caps.	II
Former stable block and archway, Home Farm; 53.52516°N 1.51884°W		c. 1715 (probable)	The stable block, which has been converted for residential use, and the archway are in sandstone. The former stable block has quoins, two storeys and eleven bays. There are three doorways with cornices, the middle one also with consoles and a Diocletian window above. Attached on the left is a round archway with projecting piers, an impost band, and square openings in the spandrels, and the wing walls contain round-arched recesses.	II
Pillared barn 53.52694°N 1.52085°W		c. 1715	A Dutch barn in sandstone with a hipped stone slate roof. It has a single storey, and six bays plus triangular end bays. There are 16 tapering pillars, each on a plinth.	II*
Menagerie House; 53.52863°N 1.51002°W	—	c. 1717	A banqueting house, extended to the rear in the 18th century, and later converted into three cottages. It is in sandstone and stuccoed and painted brick, and has a tile roof. The east front is in sandstone on a plinth and has one storey and seven bays. It contains casement windows with architraves, pulvinated friezes, and triangular pediments on consoles. The rear is stuccoed and contains the later wing, which has two storeys, three bays, and a triangular pediment containing an oculus. In the outer bays are single-storey lean-tos.	II
The Strafford Arms; 53.52937°N 1.51063°W		Early 18th century	The public house is in sandstone, with quoins, and a Welsh slate roof with moulded gable copings. There are two storeys, five bays, a lean-to on the right with a crow-stepped half-gable, and a rear wing on the left with an outshut in the angle. The central doorway has a square head, impost blocks, a plain lintel, and a hood mould, and the windows are sashes.	II
Stainborough Castle; 53.52317°N 1.52509°W		1726–30	A Gothic folly in the form of a castle, it is in sandstone. There is a roughly circular embattled curtain wall with four square guard towers, and a gatehouse, originally with four circular turrets, of which two remain. The turrets have buttresses, and round-headed openings, and are embattled. The wall linking them has a rusticated round-arched doorway with an impost band and a keystone. The guard towers have round-arched openings in the ground floor and quatrefoils above and are also embattled.	II*
Former orangery, Home Farm; 53.52660°N 1.51875°W	—	c. 1728	The former orangery is in red brick at the front and sandstone at the rear, on a plinth, with an entablature, and a hipped Welsh slate roof. There is a single storey and five bays, with full-height openings on the front. The middle bay contains a doorway with a fanlight, and the others have casement windows. At the rear are three tall openings with lintels grooved as voussoirs, and a cornice.	II
Gun Room, Wentworth Castle; 53.52475°N 1.51962°W		1732	The building, which probably originated as a banqueting house, is in red brick on a plinth, with sandstone dressings, a sill band, a modillion cornice, and a hipped Welsh slate roof. It is square with a single storey, and in Palladian style. On the main front is a projecting enriched Doric Venetian window, a frieze with triglyphs and bucrania, and an open pediment. In the right return is a doorway with an architrave and a pediment, a sash window, and a hip roofed canopy.	II*
Duke of Argyll's Monument; 53.52224°N 1.52143°W		1742	The statue is in Stainborough Park, it was erected for the 2nd Earl of Strafford to commemorate the 2nd Duke of Argyll, and later became his memorial. It is in sandstone and consists of a fluted Corinthian column on a pedestal with a moulded base, and is surmounted by a statue of Minerva. The monument is 60 feet (18 m) high, and on the base is an inscription.	II*
Statue of the First Earl of Strafford; 53.52470°N 1.51891°W		1744	The statue of the First Earl of Strafford has been moved from its original position in Stainborough Castle to its present site adjacent to Wentworth Castle. It is by John Michael Rysbrack and is in marble. The statue depicts the earl standing and leaning on a truncated column. It is on a plinth with acanthus moulding, sunken panels with inscriptions, and the Strafford coat of arms.	II*
Obelisk to Lady Mary Wortley Montagu; 53.52269°N 1.52346°W		1746	The obelisk, also known as the Sun Monument, is dedicated to Lady Mary Wortley Montagu. It is in sandstone, and consists of an obelisk with a pyramidal cap, surmounted by a bronze bowl finial. It stands on a plinth with a moulded base and cornice, and there is an inscribed marble panel.	II*
Rotunda Temple; 53.52016°N 1.50700°W		1746	An ornamental temple in Stainborough Park, it is in sandstone, and consists of a colonnade of 14 Ionic columns on a raised platform with a moulded plinth and a cornice. It is approached by curved steps. The columns carry an entablature with a carved frieze and cornice, and at the top is a dome. The central drum has a blocked doorway with an architrave, frieze and cornice, and it contains square-headed and round-arched niches.	II*
Kembla; 53.53021°N 1.51032°W	—	Mid 18th century	A schoolroom, later two dwellings, it is in sandstone with a tile roof. There is one storey and an attic, and fronts of five and three bays. On the main front are five round-arched panels divided by piers with impost blocks. In front of the third and fourth bays is a conservatory, and elsewhere are casement windows. The right return contains three similar arched panels, and there is an attic window with a cambered lintel.	II
Steeple Lodge; 53.52729°N 1.52086°W		c. 1752	The lodge at the west entrance to the grounds of Wentworth Castle is in sandstone with a tile roof. It is in the form of a Gothic church, consisting of a tower and an embattled single-storey wing. The tower has three stages, diagonal buttresses, quoins, doorways with ogee heads, quatrefoil windows, two-light windows with Y-tracery in the top stage, hood moulds between the stages, and an embattled parapet with corner pinnacles. There is a crow-stepped link to the wing that contains a casement window with a pointed head.	II
Wall and archway 53.52191°N 1.52193°W		1752	The archway, known as Archer's Hill Gate, is in sandstone on a plinth, with an impost band, and it consists of three round-headed arches in canted rusticated walls with seven ball finials. The wall to the west has an embattled parapet, and to the east is a wall linking to a ha-ha with projecting piers and coping.	II
Serpentine Bridge; 53.52739°N 1.51287°W		1758	The bridge carries a track over the Serpentine River in Stainborough Park. It is in rusticated sandstone, and consists of a single round-arched span. The bridge has voussoirs, a band and a blocking course, and a balustraded parapet.	II
Corinthian Temple, Wentworth Castle; 53.52345°N 1.51882°W		1766	A garden building in the form of a small prostyle Corinthian temple, it is in sandstone with a hipped stone slate roof. On the front are four Corinthian columns on a three-step stylobate and a full entablature. The return walls at the rear each has an arched recess with an impost band, and a rectangular recess above.	II
Entrance gateway and gates, Stainborough Park; 53.52887°N 1.51025°W		1768	The entrance gateway is in sandstone, and consists of an archway with rusticated quoins and voussoirs, an impost band, and a band over the arch. At the top is a moulded and coped pediment and three ball finials. It is flanked by coped wing walls and end piers with ball finials. The gates are in iron.	II
Cart shed, Home Farm; 53.52556°N 1.51849°W	—	Late 18th century	The cart shed is in sandstone, with quoins, and a Welsh slate roof with moulded gable copings. There are two storeys and six bays. In the centre is a four-bay arcade with segmental arches, piers and voussoirs, and the outer bays and upper floor contain casement windows. In the right return is a doorway linked by a walkway to an adjacent barn.	II
Cottage to east of cart shed, Home Farm; 53.52556°N 1.51837°W	—	Late 18th century	A farm cottage in rendered sandstone with a Welsh slate roof and moulded gable copings. Thee are two storeys, three bays on the front, and one on the sides. In the centre of the front is a doorway with a fanlight, and the windows are sashes. The left return contains a blocked doorway with a pulvinated frieze and a cornice. In the upper floor is a sash window with an architrave and a casement window, and above is a pediment with a chamfered slit in the tympanum.	II
Lower Stainborough Fold Farmhouse and The Cottage; 53.51548°N 1.53218°W	—	Late 18th century	A farmhouse divided into two dwellings, it is in sandstone with a stone slate roof. There are three bays, the middle bay projecting under a gable with an open pediment. In the centre of the ground floor is a gabled projection containing a French window, and in the upper floor are two casement windows in a round-arched recess. The outer bays have one storey and each contains a round-arched recess with a casement window.	II
Former cowhouses and calf houses, Home Farm; 53.52562°N 1.51882°W	—	c. 1800	The former cowhouses and calf houses are in plastered sandstone at the front and brick at the rear, with a Welsh slate roof. They consist of a range with a central part of two storeys and two bays, and flanking single-storey wings with four bays, the end bays and middle part projecting slightly. The middle part and the right end bay have a coped pediment, and all parts have doorways and windows.	II
Farm buildings to rear of Round Green Farmhouse; 53.52582°N 1.49864°W	—	c. 1800 (probable)	The farm buildings are in sandstone, with roofs of asbestos sheet or stone slate. They form a U-shaped plan, with a single-storey five-bay barn on the west, an L-shaped two-storey range on the north, and a single-storey range on the east. The openings include arched wagon entries, doorways with quoined surrounds, loft openings, and casement windows. In the east range is an arcade of six arches, blocked with stone and brick.	II
St James' Church; 53.52522°N 1.51855°W		1841–42	The church is in sandstone with a Welsh slate roof, and has embattled parapets throughout. It consists of a nave and a chancel in one unit, a south porch, a north vestry, and a west tower. The tower has clasping buttresses, and crocketed corner pinnacles.	II
Gates, gate piers and walls, St James' Church; 53.52505°N 1.51844°W	—	1841–42	The walls enclosing the churchyard are in sandstone and are coped. In the centre are gate piers, each on a plinth, with sunken panels on the shaft, a band, and a cornice with a blocking course. The double gates are in iron.	II
Wood Nook Farmhouse; 53.51464°N 1.52286°W		Mid 19th century	The farmhouse is in sandstone with a stone slate roof, two storeys, and three bays. On the front are two doorways with chamfered Tudor arched lintels and casement windows. At the rear are two buttresses, a floor band, and sash windows.	II
Dairy house, Home Farm; 53.52550°N 1.51873°W	—	Late 19th century (probable)	The dairy house is in sandstone with a rear brick wall, quoins, and a Welsh slate roof with gable copings and shaped kneelers. There is one storey and five bays. On the front are two doorways and casement windows, at the rear is a doorway with a quoined surround, and on the roof are two wooden louvres.	II
Conservatory and linking bridge, Wentworth Castle; 53.52419°N 1.51962°W		1885	The conservatory to the west of the house is in cast iron with glazing, and has a plinth and a north wall in sandstone. There is a single storey, ten bays at the front and three on the sides, a canted projection on the south, and a lean-to porch on the east. Between the bays are miniature Doric columns with scrolls and rosettes in the spandrels, and in the front and left return are doorways with wooden cornices. At the top is a decorated gutter, a triple-spanned hipped roof with end finials, and a full-length lantern along the centre. On the east is a linking bridge to the house that has wooden dado panels, decorative spandrels, and ridge cresting.	II*
Gates, gate piers, statues, railings and balustrades, Wentworth Castle; 53.52432°N 1.51787°W		1912	Sandstone walls with wrought iron railings and balustrades enclose the area to the east and south of the house. They contain two sets of decorative iron gates that each have a plinth, sunken panels on the shaft, and a band below a cornice; the southern piers are surmounted by lead statues of a lion and a griffin.	II
