= Summer Lane railway station =

Former railway station in Barnsley, England

Summer Lane
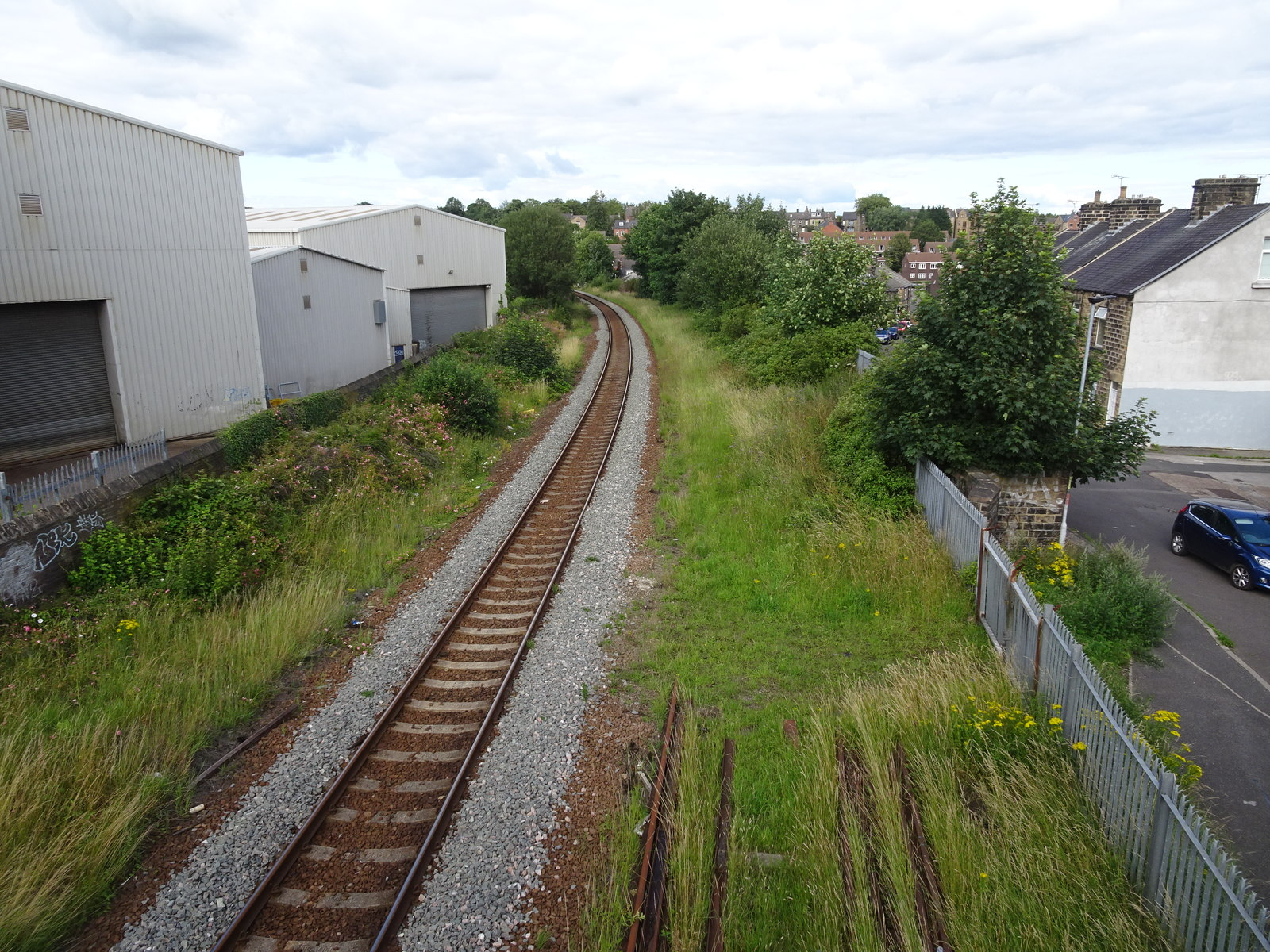
- Station site in July 2020.

General information
- Location: Barnsley, Barnsley; England
- Coordinates: 53.5545°N 1.4924°W
- Grid reference: SE337065
- Platforms: 2

Other information
- Status: Disused

History
- Original company: Manchester, Sheffield and Lincolnshire Railway
- Pre-grouping: Great Central Railway
- Post-grouping: London and North Eastern Railway

Key dates
- 11 Nov. 1855: opened
- 22 June 1959: closed
Location

Summer Lane railway station was a railway station on the Barnsley to Penistone line situated some 1 mile 16 chains (1.9 km) from Barnsley Exchange, South Yorkshire, England. The station was opened in 1855 by the Manchester, Sheffield and Lincolnshire Railway and was closed between February 1857 December 1859 and February 1867 when it was reopened.

It was finally closed by British Railways on 29 June 1959 when the local passenger services were withdrawn from other stations on the lines in the area such as Barnsley Court House, Silkstone and Dodworth.

In 1928 it was connected to a corn mill and jam factory.
