= Listed buildings in Penistone East =

Penistone East is a ward in the metropolitan borough of Barnsley, South Yorkshire, England. The ward contains three listed buildings that are recorded in the National Heritage List for England. Of these, one is listed at Grade II*, the middle of the three grades, and the others are at Grade II, the lowest grade. The ward is to the west of the town of Barnsley, and is entirely rural. The listed buildings consist of a former manor house and associated structures converted for residential use, a memorial obelisk and a lodge in the grounds of Wentworth Castle, and a former canal aqueduct.

== Key ==
Grade	Criteria
II*	Particularly important buildings of more than special interest
II	Buildings of national importance and special interest

== Buildings ==
Name and location	Photograph	Date	Notes	Grade
Queen Anne's Obelisk; 53.52193°N 1.50092°W		1734	The obelisk, a memorial to Queen Anne in the grounds of Wentworth Castle, is in sandstone. It stands on a two-step plinth, and has a pyramidal cap. There are inscriptions on two sides of the obelisk, said to carry coded messages. In a circle around the obelisk are 16 octagonal bollards.	II*
Queen Anne's Lodge and gates 53.52177°N 1.50039°W		c. 1734	The lodge, which was later extended, is in sandstone and has a twin hipped stone slate roof. There is a single storey, and on the side facing the drive is a sash window flanked by casement windows with pointed arched heads. Each return contains a blocked doorway and an ogee-headed window. Attached to the northwest corner are wrought iron gates and stone piers with shaped heads.	II
Former aqueduct over Silkstone Beck; 53.56948°N 1.54286°W	—	c. 1802	The aqueduct carried a canal, now infilled, over Silkstone Beck. It is in stone, and has sloping sides with copings and a band. The beck flows through a tunnel about 3 metres (9.8 ft) in diameter, narrowing to about 1 metre (3 ft 3 in) in the centre, and it is about 10 metres (33 ft) long.	II
