= Hood Green =

Village in South Yorkshire, England

Coordinates: 53.522°N 1.534°W

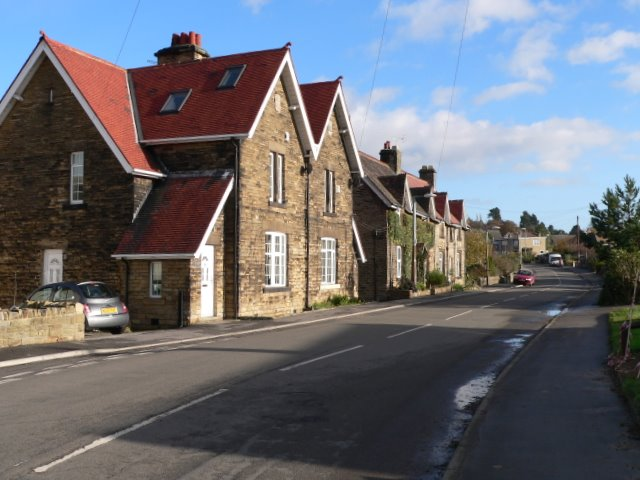
- Village street, Hood Green

- Location within South Yorkshire
- OS grid reference: SE309029
- Civil parish: Stainborough
- Metropolitan borough: Barnsley
- Metropolitan county: South Yorkshire
- Region: Yorkshire and the Humber
- Country: England
- Sovereign state: United Kingdom
- Post town: BARNSLEY
- Postcode district: S75
- Police: South Yorkshire
- Fire: South Yorkshire
- Ambulance: Yorkshire
- UK Parliament: Penistone and Stocksbridge

Hood Green is a small village in the Metropolitan Borough of Barnsley, South Yorkshire, England. It is near the villages of Stainborough, Thurgoland and Silkstone Common and is within the Penistone and Stocksbridge parliamentary constituency.

Hood Green is historically part of the Stainborough C.P.

Wentworth Castle and gardens is a nearby tourist attraction.
