= Northern College (England) =

Location
- Wentworth Castle; Stainborough; Barnsley, South Yorkshire, S75 3ET; England; 53.52513°N 1.52048°W

Information
- Type: Residential and Community Adult Education
- Motto: Begin, Discover, Succeed!
- Established: 1978
- Principal: Emma Beal
- Website: http://www.northern.ac.uk

Northern College is an adult residential college based at Wentworth Castle in Barnsley, South Yorkshire, England.

== History ==
Founded in 1978, the college is for the education and training of men and women who are without formal qualifications and are seeking to return to learning. It also offers training for those who are active in community and voluntary groups as well as in trade unions.

The main building is Grade I listed dating back to the 17th and 18th centuries with 40 acres of formal gardens and 600 acres of parkland. It is set in the only Grade I listed landscape in South Yorkshire, Wentworth Castle Gardens.

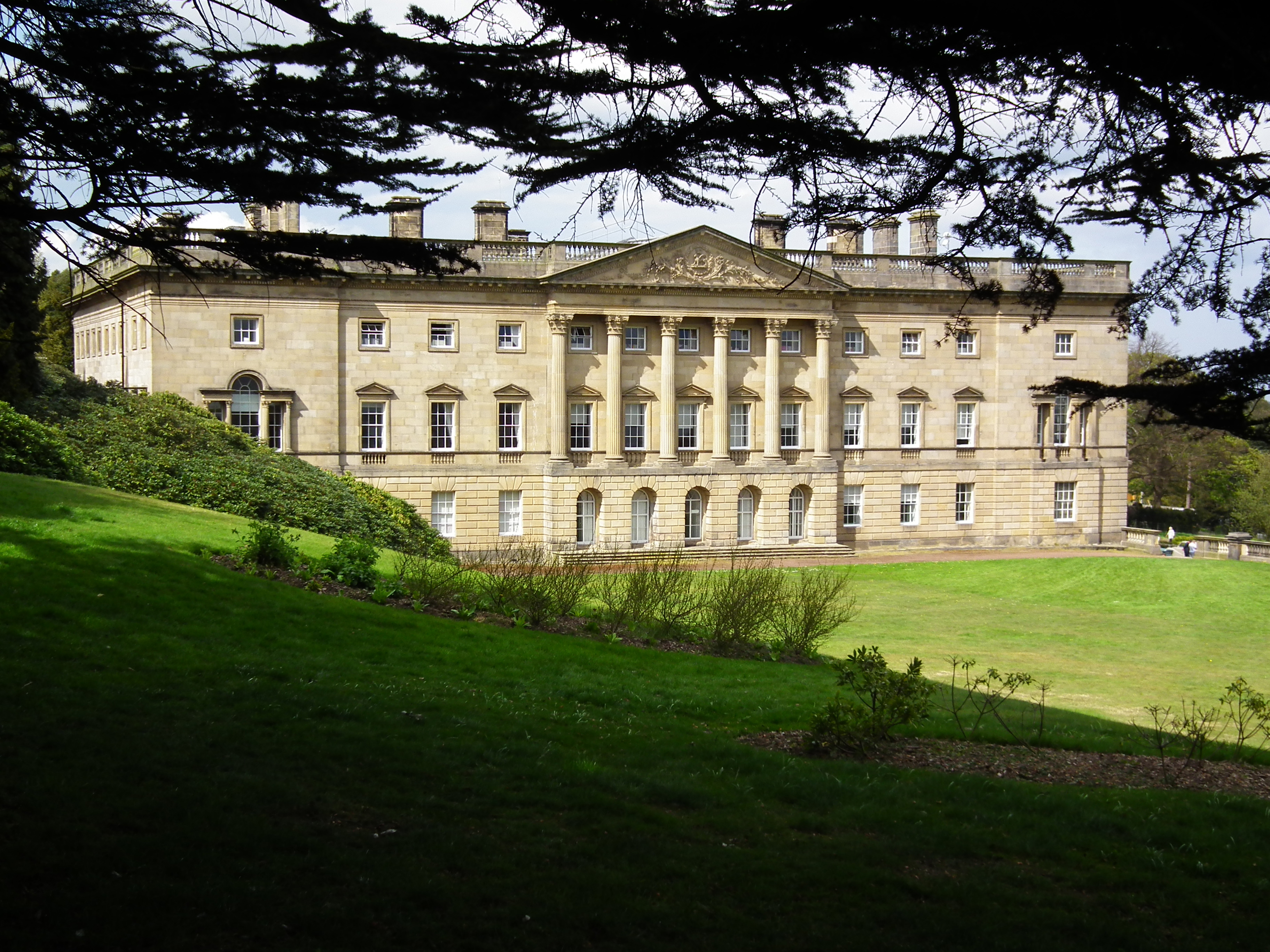
The Northern College

The college is one of the two residential adult education colleges in the United Kingdom. It is also one of the Institutes for Adult Learning. It is a registered charity.

== Partners ==
The college is in partnership with in excess of 100 stakeholders including: The National Trust, Barnsley Museums, Local Authorities, Jobcentre Plus, Work Programme Providers, Community Groups, Children's Centres, Criminal Justice Services, Drug and Alcohol agencies, Mental Health providers, Carer Support Groups, the Voluntary Sector, the trade union movement and universities.

== Courses ==
Most courses are residential and have a focus on education for individual and social transformation. Accredited courses are available from entry level to post graduate level. Degree and post graduate qualifications (in teaching), taught at the college, are awarded by the University of Huddersfield.

In addition, the college runs outreach programmes throughout South and West Yorkshire and a Foundation Programme with short residential courses in a range of subjects including Humanities, Social Studies, English and Maths and ICT. These are both non-accredited and accredited at level 1 and 2.

The Access to Higher Education Diploma is designed for mature students who want to go on to study at a higher level, such as university, but lack the formal qualifications to do so. Two major pathways are available for study: Humanities and Social Science and Computing.

== Conference facilities ==
The Northern College is an academic venue which hires out its facilities for conferences, workshops and residential summer schools.

== Ofsted report ==
The college has been judged outstanding in all areas by Ofsted, which inspected the college between 17 and 20 June 2014. The inspectors said that "no significant improvements" were required.

The college is also a multiple Beacon Award-winning institution.

== College Principals ==
- Michael Barratt Brown (1978–1983)
- Prof. Bob Fryer (1983 – 1998)
- Prof. Tony Jowitt (1999–2007)
- Jill Westerman (2007 – 2018)
- Yultan Mellor (2018–present)
