= John Charles Brooke =

English antiquarian

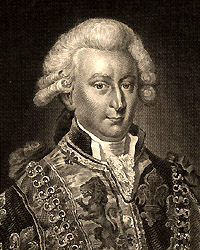
Engraved portrait of John Charles Brooke.

John Charles Brooke FSA (27 August 1748 – 3 February 1794) was an English antiquarian who served as Somerset Herald from 1777 until his death.

== Early life ==
Brooke was born at Fieldhead in the parish of Silkstone, Yorkshire in August 1748, the second son of Dr. William Brooke by his wife Alice Mawhood. He was a descendant of the Rev. John Brooke, Rector of High Hoyland, who had himself – in the previous century – been an antiquarian interested in the history of Yorkshire. John Charles Brooke eventually came into possession of some of the historical material collected by Rev. Brooke, and thus his "taste for historical and genealogical research" was "perhaps inherited."

Brooke was sent by his parents to London to be apprenticed to James Kirkby, a chemist at Holborn. However "after discovering a strong turn to heraldic pursuits" he attracted the attention of Edward Howard, the future 9th Duke of Norfolk (the holder of which title is hereditary Earl Marshal in charge of the College of Arms) he secured a placement in the College of Arms in the City of London.

== Career ==
He became Somerset Herald in 1777.

== Death ==
On 3 February 1794 he attended the Haymarket Theatre in Pall Mall, London with Benjamin Pingo, York Herald. Both men were crushed to death in a crowd of well-wishers eager to see the king, at the side door of the theatre. According to Walter Thornbury, "Mr Brooke had died standing, as he was found as if asleep, and with colour still in his cheeks." King George III had attended the theatre that day and was only told of the deaths of both Officers of Arms after he had departed. John Charles Brooke was buried in the Church of St Benet Paul's Wharf, in the City of London, a church closely associated with the College of Arms.
