= Listed buildings in Dodworth =

Dodworth is a ward in the Dearne Valley in the metropolitan borough of Barnsley, South Yorkshire, England. The ward contains 17 listed buildings that are recorded in the National Heritage List for England. All the listed buildings are designated at Grade II, the lowest of the three grades, which is applied to "buildings of national importance and special interest". The ward contains the village of Dodworth and the surrounding area. Most of the listed buildings are houses and associated structures, farmhouses and farm buildings. The other listed buildings consist of a church, a public house, a milestone, and a war memorial.

== Buildings ==
Name and location	Photograph	Date	Notes
Outbuilding at rear of 13 High Street; 53.54274°N 1.52556°W	—	15th or 16th century	The outbuilding is timber framed, it was encased in stone in the 17th century and was altered later. It has quoins, it is partly rendered with some exposed timber framing, and the roof is in stone slate on the west and asbestos on the east. There are various openings, most have been altered and some have chamfered surrounds.
Field Head Farmhouse; 53.54924°N 1.54372°W	—	16th century (possible)	The farmhouse has a timber framed core, it was encased in stone in the 17th century, and extensively rebuilt and extended in about 1985. The house has quoins, a tile roof, two storeys, and a complex plan. There are two gables on the west side, a projecting wing on the east side with chamfered gable copings, moulded kneelers, and ball finials, and a gabled lower range on the north. Two double-chamfered windows have survived, and the other openings have been altered. Inside, there is exposed timber framing.
Barn, Home Farm; 53.53706°N 1.53581°W	—	16th century (probable)	A timber framed barn, it was encased in stone in the 17th century, and has a stone slate roof. The barn contains a square-headed cart entry, a small entrance with a quoined surround, and later windows.
Cottage north of Field Head Farmhouse; 53.54950°N 1.54378°W	—	16th or 17th century	A cruck framed farm building later encased in stone, and converted into a cottage in about 1985. It has a tile roof, and one storey, and contains two arched entrances and two square windows. Inside there are three cruck trusses.
Easternmost barn, Field Head Farmhouse; 53.54961°N 1.54340°W	—	16th or 17th century	A timber framed barn, it has been encased in stone, and was converted for residential use in 1986. There are four bays, and inside are two cruck trusses.
Barn north of Royd Hill Farmhouse; 53.56218°N 1.53479°W	—	16th or 17th century	A timber framed barn that was later encased in stone, with a stone slate roof. There are 4½ internal bays, and the barn contains a square-headed cart entry and a later doorway. At the rear is an opposing cart entry with a cambered head, and a projecting gabled porch.
Dodworth Old Hall; 53.54279°N 1.52598°W	—	1641	A house, later the end of a row, and used for other purposes. It is rendered, with quoins, a moulded floor band, and a Welsh slate roof, hipped on the left. There are two storeys and two bays. On the front is a doorway with a moulded surround, and an initialled and dated Tudor arched lintel. The windows on the front have been altered, and at the rear are mullioned windows, and a doorway with a moulded surround and a cambered head.
Keresforth Hill Farmhouse; 53.54239°N 1.50415°W	—	17th century	The farmhouse, which was later extended, is in stone with a tile roof. There are two storeys and two bays, a lower later extension to the right, and a gabled rear wing, with a later rendered extension. The central doorway has a moulded surround, and the windows have three lights, a chamfered surround, and mullions.
Saville Hall; 53.53638°N 1.52360°W	—	17th century	A stone farmhouse on a chamfered plinth, with quoins, paired gutter brackets, and a stone slate roof with chamfered gable copings, square kneelers, and ball finials. There are two storeys and an attic, a front of three bays, and a smaller rear wing. The windows are 20th-century casements in raised plain surrounds.
Outbuilding east of Saville Hall; 53.53632°N 1.52328°W	—	17th century	The farm building is in stone with quoins, and a stone slate roof with chamfered copings on moulded kneelers. There are two storeys, and a T-shaped plan, with a main range of about four internal bays and a rear wing. The barn contains various openings, including windows with chamfered surrounds, and in the left return is a Tudor arched doorway with a quoined surround in each floor.
The Grove; 53.54120°N 1.52218°W	—	17th century	A large house that was later altered and extended, it is in stone, partly rendered, with quoins, and a stone slate roof with chamfered gable copings on moulded kneelers with finials. There are two storeys, a double-depth plan, and three bays, the middle bay on the front with a parapet. The windows are mullioned, some with hood moulds. At the rear is a portico with tapering octagonal piers and pilasters. The windows are tripartite with grooved lintels, and there is a round-headed window.
Barn southeast of Saville Hall; 53.53601°N 1.52286°W	—	167(8)?	A stone barn with quoins, and a stone slate roof with chamfered copings on moulded kneelers. There are about four internal bays, and the barn contains a cart entry with a quoined surround and a steel lintel, four blocked Tudor arched entrances, two square pitching holes, and three round-arched vents.
Dodworth Grange; 53.53861°N 1.53297°W	—	1710	A large house that was extended in about 1900. It is in stone, the main part rendered, with stone slate roofs. The main part has quoins, a floor band, a moulded eaves cornice, and chamfered gable copings on square kneelers. There are two storeys, a double-depth plan and four bays. The doorway has a moulded architrave, a swept head, and a cornice on console brackets, and the windows are sashes in architraves. The single-bay extension recessed on the left contains a canted bay window with a sash window above. Projecting to the right is the two-storey extension, and at the rear is some incorporated 17th-century material.
Travellers' Inn; 53.54113°N 1.52768°W		1782	The public house is rendered, with quoins, and a Welsh slate roof. There are three storeys and three bays, and recessed two-storey single-bay wings. The central block has a hipped roof, and an embattled porch in the right bay. In the central bay of the middle floor is a quatrefoil, and above it is a dated plaque. Most of the windows are mullioned, and there are some sashes. At the rear are two tripartite windows in the top floor, and two Venetian windows in the middle floor.
Milestone; 53.55186°N 1.50552°W		Early to mid 19th century	The milestone is built into a wall on the south side of Dodworth Road (A628 road). It is a stone post with a rounded top, inscribed with the distances to Barnsley and Manchester.
St John's Church; 53.54085°N 1.53016°W		1843–46	The church is in stone with a Welsh slate roof, and consists of a nave, a small chancel, and a west tower. The tower has three stages, with a west door, tall bell openings, a moulded cornice, and large conical corner pinnacles. There are similar pinnacles on the corners of the nave and chancel, and all the openings have round-arched heads.
War memorial 53.54267°N 1.52656°W		c. 1918	The war memorial is in a walled enclosure by a crossroads. It is in sandstone, and consists of the life-size figure of an infantryman with a rifle and a bayonet, standing on a square slightly tapering pedestal with a cornice and a moulded base, on a two-step podium. On the front of the pedestal is an inscription, and on the sides are the names of those lost in the conflict.
