= Silkstone Common railway station =

Railway station in South Yorkshire, England

Silkstone Common
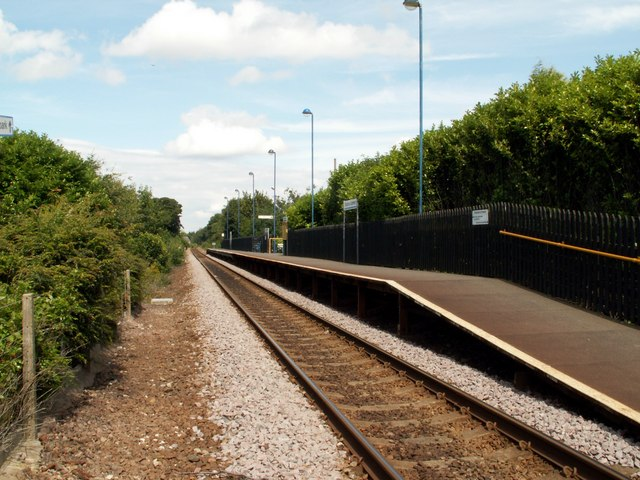

General information
- Location: Silkstone Common, Barnsley; England
- Coordinates: 53.5350°N 1.5635°W
- Grid reference: SE290043
- Manager: Northern Trains
- Transit authority: South Yorkshire Passenger Transport Executive
- Platforms: 1

Other information
- Station code: SLK
- Fare zone: Barnsley
- Classification: DfT category F2

History
- Opened: 1855; 171 years ago

Key dates
- 15 June 1959; 67 years ago: Closed
- 13 May 1983; 43 years ago: Reopened

Passengers
- 2021/22: ▲28,164
- 2022/23: ▲29,096
- 2023/24: ▲31,134
- 2024/25: ▲34,104
- 2025/26: ▲34,350
Location
Notes
- Passenger statistics from the Office of Rail and Road

The present Silkstone Common railway station, which opened by British Rail on 14 May 1983 serves the village of Silkstone Common, near Barnsley in South Yorkshire, England. The station is 3 miles (4.8 km) west of Barnsley on the Penistone Line between Huddersfield and Sheffield.

== History ==
The original station, simply known as "Silkstone", was opened on 1 November 1855 and rebuilt on the same site in the last quarter of the 19th century in the "Double Pavilion" style favoured by the Manchester, Sheffield and Lincolnshire Railway. The former station master's house remains towards the Penistone end of the present platform. This is now a private residence.

The present station is the third to serve the village.

The station is built over the tunnel through which passed the Silkstone Wagonway, an early rail link from the coal pits in Silkstone Common, via a rope-hauled incline and the village of Silkstone to the Barnsley Canal. Little can be seen from the station, but looking at the wall opposite the platform a small rise in the coping stones is detectable which coincides with the arch of the tunnel.

The station closed in June 1959 with the withdrawal of the Penistone–Barnsley–Doncaster stopping services, but was reopened in May 1983, after Sheffield–Huddersfield services had been diverted via the route.

== Facilities ==
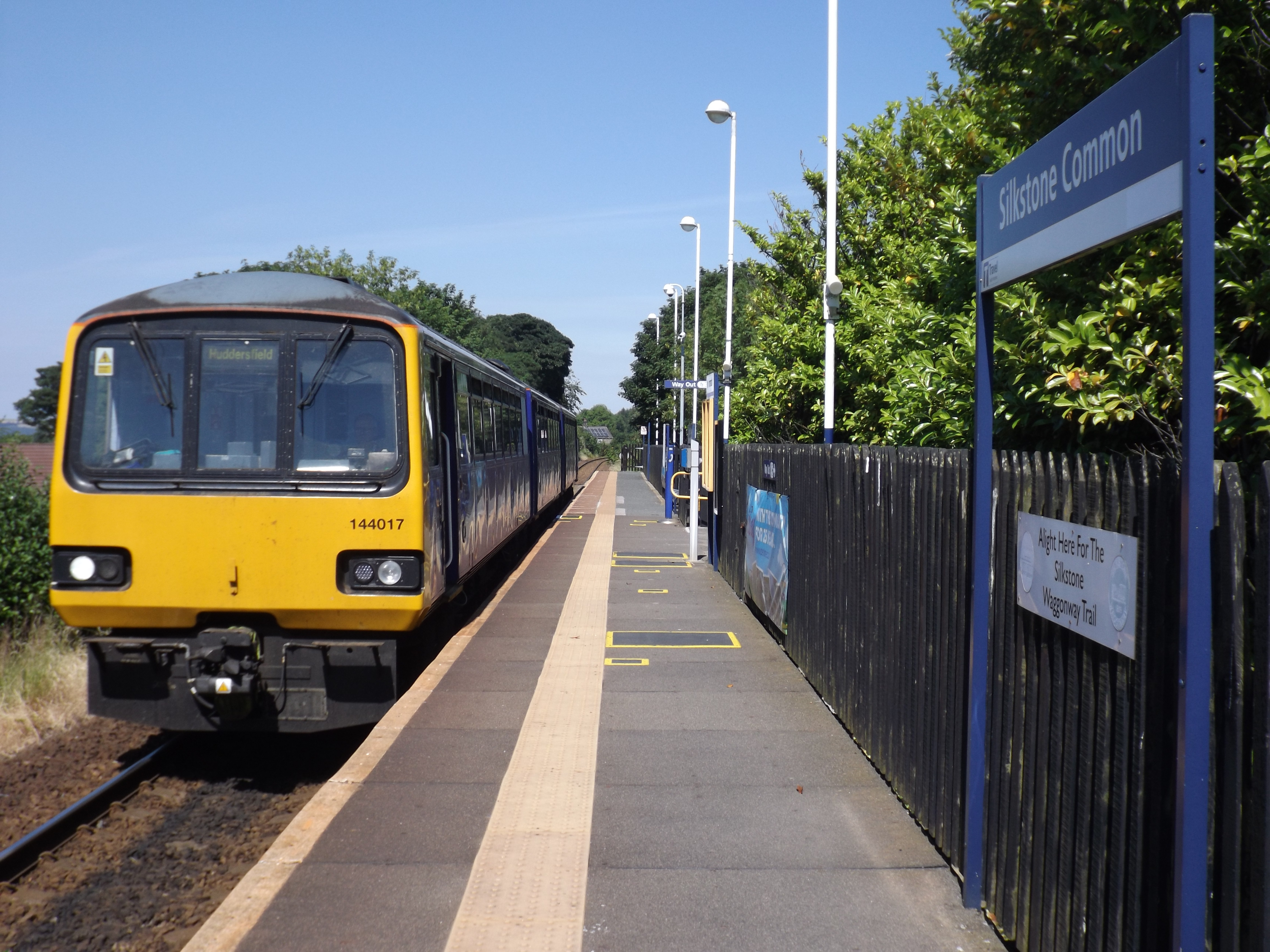
The station in 2018

The station is unstaffed and has only basic amenities, including a waiting shelter, bench seating, timetable poster boards and CCTV cameras. No customer display screens or automated announcements are available. Tickets must be purchased in advance or from the conductor on board the train. No step-free access is available to the platform (pedestrian access is via steps from Knabb Lane or a barrow crossing from the car park on the other side of the line). There is now a visual display showing train times and approximate arrival of trains, and in addition announcements, both visual and by speaker about what time the train will arrive and in addition if there are any delays. There is also wheelchair access from Knabbs Lane at the side of what used to be the station house. More recently an automated ticket machine has been located inside the new shelter, whereby tickets can be purchased via credit, debit and student cards, as well as promise to pay.

== Services ==
On Monday to Saturday, trains operate hourly each way, towards Huddersfield and Barnsley/Sheffield; a two-hourly frequency operates on Sundays.

Preceding station	National Rail	Following station
Dodworth	Northern Trains Penistone Line	Penistone
