= Dodworth railway station =

Railway station in South Yorkshire, England

Dodworth
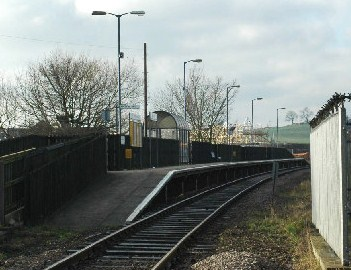
- Dodworth railway station in 2006

General information
- Location: Dodworth, Barnsley; England
- Coordinates: 53.544160°N 1.531950°W
- Grid reference: SE311053
- Manager: Northern Trains
- Transit authority: South Yorkshire Passenger Transport Executive
- Platforms: 1

Other information
- Station code: DOD
- Fare zone: Barnsley
- Classification: DfT category F2

History
- Opened: 1 July 1854; 172 years ago

Key dates
- 15 June 1959; 67 years ago: closed
- 29 May 1989; 37 years ago: reopened

Passengers
- 2021/22: ▲39,128
- 2022/23: ▼38,616
- 2023/24: ▲42,686
- 2024/25: ▲47,920
- 2025/26: ▲50,146
Location
Notes
- Passenger statistics from the Office of Rail and Road

Dodworth railway station serves the village of Dodworth, in the Metropolitan Borough of Barnsley, South Yorkshire, England. The station is 2 miles 71 chains (4.6 km) west of Barnsley on the Penistone Line between Huddersfield and Sheffield.

Originally its immediate next stations were at Silkstone and Summer Lane. Summer Lane was not reopened, and nowadays the next station eastwards is Barnsley.

== History ==
The present Dodworth station was opened on the site of the original, built by South Yorkshire Railway and opened on 1 July 1854, adjacent to the level crossing which took the main Manchester road (the present-day A628 road) through the village. The crossing and the access to the local colliery was controlled from a signal box, of Manchester, Sheffield and Lincolnshire Railway (MS&LR) hipped-roof design, set by the crossing and which was demolished by a derailment on 24 January 1955. The rebuilt box was a brick built, flat roofed affair (this still stands, but is now disused - the crossing is remotely operated from Barnsley Power Signal Box (P.S.B.).

The station was rebuilt by the Manchester, Sheffield and Lincolnshire Railway in the last quarter of the 19th century in their "Double Pavilion" style. This station was closed on 29 June 1959. Coal traffic from the adjacent mine continued to be dispatched by rail right up until its closure in 1985, but the former sidings have since been lifted and the site redeveloped.

== New station ==
Part of the South Yorkshire Passenger Transport Executive's plan for the line was to reopen the stations at Silkstone (actually at Silkstone Common) and Dodworth. Dodworth was reopened as a single platform station, with car parking facilities from the commencement of the new timetable on 15 May 1989.

The station is unstaffed and has only basic facilities (a waiting shelter, timetable information posters and bench seating). There is a display screen in the shelter, occasional automatic announcements and a customer help point at the station entrance. The station is “Green tick” so step-free access is available to the platform for those in wheelchairs.

== Services ==
Monday to Sunday, trains operate hourly towards Huddersfield westbound and to Barnsley and Sheffield eastbound. On a Sunday several services are extended to Lincoln central.

Preceding station	National Rail	Following station
Barnsley	Northern Trains Penistone Line	Silkstone Common

== Gallery ==
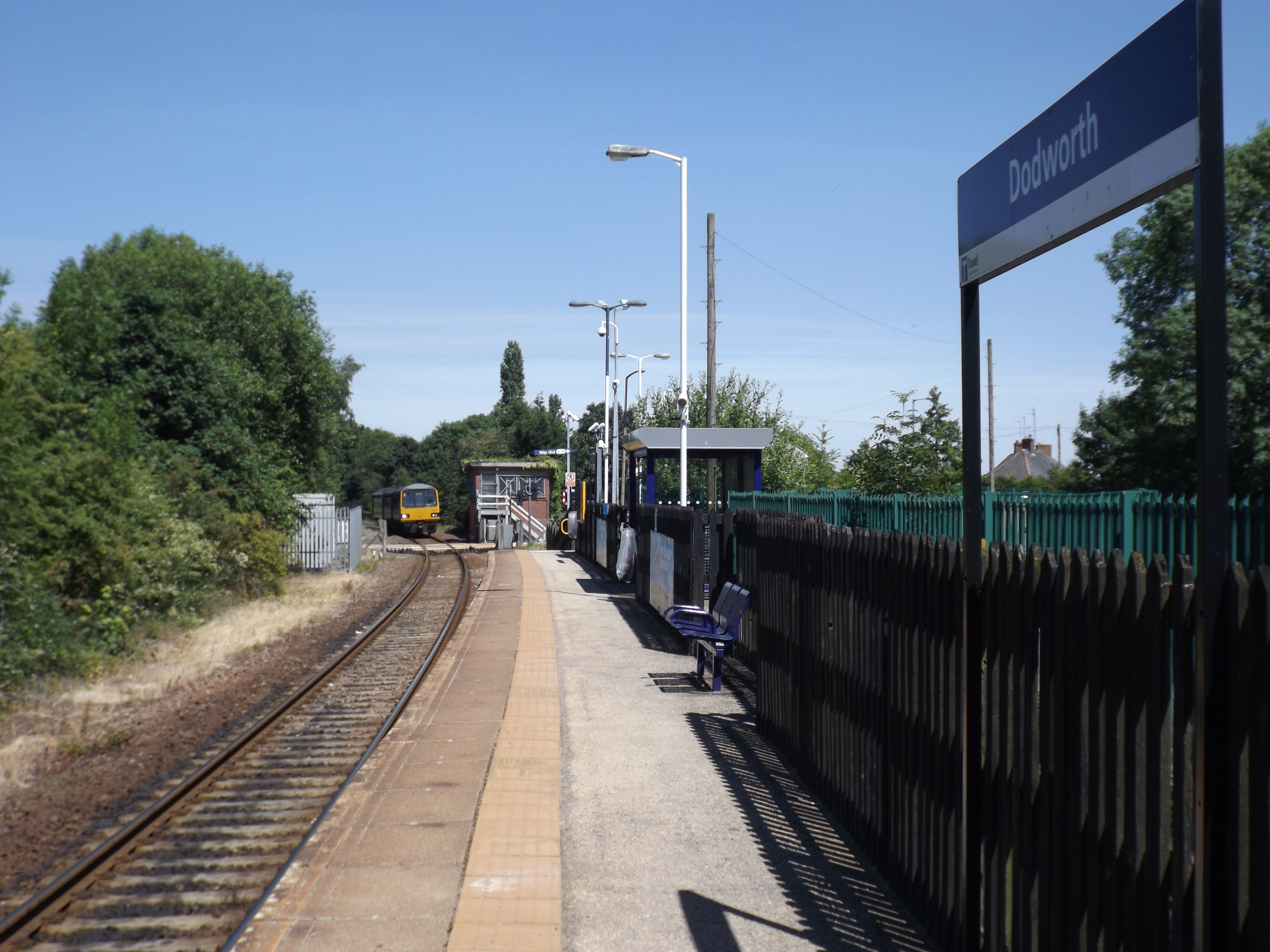
The station in 2018

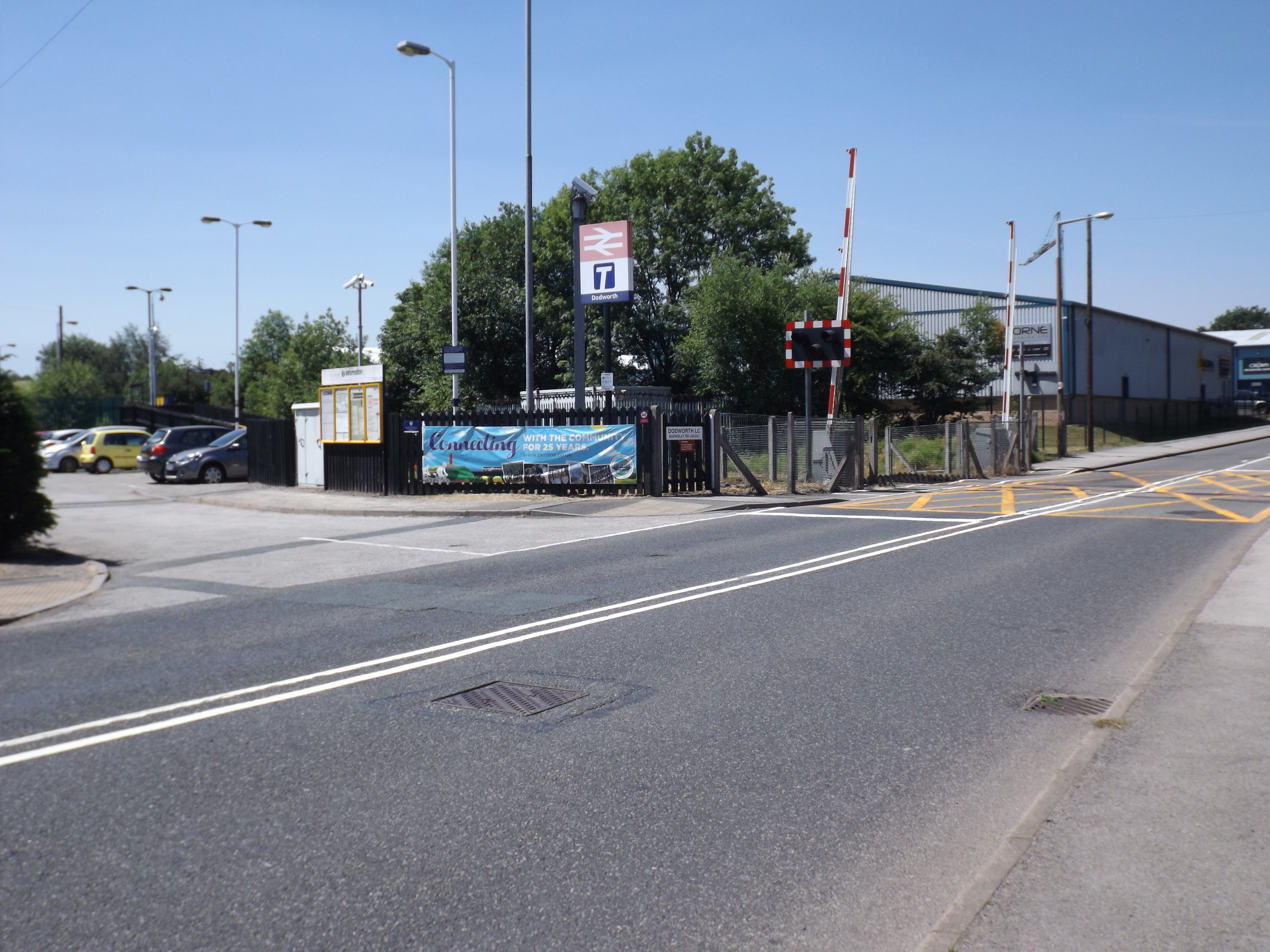
The road rail crossing at the station
