= Listed buildings in Silkstone =

Silkstone is a civil parish in the metropolitan borough of Barnsley, South Yorkshire, England. The parish contains 23 listed buildings that are recorded in the National Heritage List for England. Of these, one is listed at Grade I, the highest of the three grades, one is at Grade II*, the middle grade, and the others are at Grade II, the lowest grade. The parish contains the villages of Silkstone and Silkstone Common, and the surrounding countryside. The most important building in the parish is All Saints Church, which is listed, together with graveslabs, a tomb, and a memorial in the churchyard. The other listed buildings are houses and cottages, farmhouses and farm buildings, a war memorial, and a set of stocks.

== Key ==
Grade	Criteria
I	Buildings of exceptional interest, sometimes considered to be internationally important
II*	Particularly important buildings of more than special interest
II	Buildings of national importance and special interest

== Buildings ==
Name and location	Photograph	Date	Notes	Grade
All Saints Church; 53.54850°N 1.56255°W		12th century	The church was remodelled in the late 15th century, and the chancel was rebuilt in 1857–58 by Anthony Salvin. The church is built in stone, the chancel has a lead floor, and it is in Perpendicular style. It consists of a nave with a clerestory, north and south aisles, a south porch, a chancel with a southeast vestry, and a west tower. The tower has two stages, diagonal buttresses, and a west doorway with a moulded surround, above which is a window and two-light bell openings. At the top is an embattled parapet with gargoyles and pinnacles. The aisles, nave, porch and chapels also have embattled parapets. The aisles have detached low buttresses that rise as square pinnacles, and are connected to the nave by flying buttresses in the form of angels, grotesques and beasts.	I
Range of barns, Bull Haw Farm; 53.54906°N 1.58234°W	—	16th century (probable)	The barn and farm building are timber framed, and were encased in stone in the 17th century. They have quoins, a stone slate roof, and an L-shaped plan with fronts of two and three bays. The main range has a square-headed cart entry with a quoined surround, two animal doors with quoined surrounds and hood moulds, and a symmetrical arrangement of round-arched ventilation slits cut from single blocks of stone. In the other range are similar vents and a cart entry.	II
Barn, Dodworth Moor End Farm; 53.53008°N 1.55172°W	—	16th century, or earlier	A cruck framed barn that was encased in stone, probably in the 17th century, it has quoins and a Welsh slate roof with courses of stone slate. There are five internal bays, and it contains a full-height square-headed cart entrance with a quoined surround, slit vents, and a 20th-century dormer. Inside, there are four cruck trusses.	II
Barn range including Woolley Manor Cottage; 53.54103°N 1.56824°W	—	16th century (probable)	The range is timber framed, it was clad in stone in the 17th century, and was partly converted in the 1980s. The range has quoins, and a stone slate roof with moulded gable copings on decorated moulded kneelers. The cottage is on the left, with two storeys and a front outshut. The barn range has an L-shaped plan, and contains various openings, including a square-headed cart entry with a quoined surround, other entrances with quoined surrounds, including an upper floor doorway with a cambered head and a chamfered surround, windows, and slit vents.	II
Woolley Manor; 53.54149°N 1.56857°W	—	1628	The house is in stone with quoins, a stone slate roof, two storeys and attics. The older part is the right wing, with the hall range and left wing added in the 19th century, giving an H-shaped plan with gabled cross-wings. The reset doorway has a moulded surround, and above it is an arched panel with initials and the date. The windows are mullioned with hood moulds.	II
Hill Top Cottages; 53.53833°N 1.55985°W	—	17th century	A group of three cottages in stone, rendered at the front, with quoins, and a stone slate roof with chamfered gable copings on moulded kneelers. There are two storeys, and a U-shaped plan, with a front range of three bays, and two rear wings. On the front is a 20th-century porch, and a doorway with a cambered head to the right. Some of the windows are mullioned with some mullions removed, the others are later replacements, and there are blocked slit vents in the gable apex.	II
Knabbe's Hall; 53.53028°N 1.56640°W	—	c. 1658–74	A large farmhouse in stone on a plinth, with quoins and a stone slate roof, moulded gable copings and apex finials. There are two storeys and attics, and a front of three gabled bays, the right bay slightly recessed. In the middle bay is a gabled two-storey open porch, and a doorway with a moulded surround, moulded imposts, and a decorative lintel. Above it is an iron plaque with a date and the royal coat of arms, and a sundial in the gable apex. The windows are mullioned, or cross windows, and between the floors is a continuous hood mould.	II*
Barn west of Knabbe's Hall; 53.53035°N 1.56696°W	—	Mid to late 17th century	A stone barn with quoins, and a stone slate roof with chamfered gable copings on moulded kneelers. There are three internal bays, and a two-bay outshut on the right. The barn contains a central square-headed cart entry with a quoined surround, an animal doorway, and two windows.	II
Farm building west of Knabbe's Hall; 53.53039°N 1.56680°W	—	Mid to late 17th century	The farm building is in stone with quoins, and a stone slate roof with chamfered gable copings on moulded kneelers. There are probably two internal bays, and a continuous rear outshut. In the right gable end are three animal doorway with quoined and chamfered surrounds, and a fourth, later doorway. Above are symmetrically arranged round-arched ventilation holes cut from single pieces of stone.	II
Graveslab (Couldwell); 53.54839°N 1.56286°W	—	c. 1711	The graveslab is in the churchyard of All Saints Church, and is to the memory of members of the Couldwell and Hirst families. It is in sandstone, and has incised decoration to the edges and dividing the stone lengthways, each part with arched decoration at the top.	II
Graveslab (Wombersley); 53.54844°N 1.56287°W	—	c. 1718	The graveslab is in the churchyard of All Saints Church, and is to the memory of Mary Wombersley. It is in sandstone, and has a verse, and relief decoration of vines to the edge and in an arch at the top.	II
Raised graveslab (Jub); 53.54851°N 1.56296°W	—	c. 1722	The graveslab is in the churchyard of All Saints Church, and is to the memory of members of the Jub (or Jubb) family. It is in sandstone with simple line decoration.	II
Raised graveslab (Whitwham); 53.54837°N 1.56202°W	—	c. 1750	The graveslab is in the churchyard of All Saints Church, and is to the memory of members of the Whitwham family. It is in sandstone, and has simple moulding to the edge, and it is divided lengthways, each half with arched decoration at the head.	II
Tomb; 53.54841°N 1.56200°W	—	18th century (probable)	The tomb is in the churchyard of All Saints Church, it is in gritstone, and is rectangular. There is a chamfered recessed panel in the west end, and a pitched top on a moulded cornice.	II
Raised graveslab (Downing); 53.54851°N 1.56328°W	—	c. 1753	The graveslab is in the churchyard of All Saints Church, and is to the memory of William Downing. It is in sandstone, with a verse, a moulded edge, and arched decoration at the head.	II
Raised graveslab (Beckit); 53.54832°N 1.56208°W	—	c. 1756	The graveslab is in the churchyard of All Saints Church, and is to the memory of Thomas Beckit and his wife. It is in sandstone, and has a moulded edge, and arched decoration at the top.	II
Raised graveslab (Hawksworth); 53.54863°N 1.56314°W	—	c. 1763	The graveslab is in the churchyard of All Saints Church, and is to the memory of members of the Hawksworth family. It is in sandstone, and has two incised arched panels with a relief carving of vines.	II
Raised graveslab (Beardshall); 53.54846°N 1.56315°W	—	c. 1769	The graveslab is in the churchyard of All Saints Church, and is to the memory of Richard Beardshall and his wife. It is in sandstone, and has simple line decoration on the edges, and dividing the stone lengthways, each part with an arch at the top.	II
Bank House; 53.54457°N 1.56285°W	—	1806	A stone house, at one time a public house, with quoins, a floor band, and a stone slate roof. There are two storeys, a symmetrical front of two bays, and a rear wing. In the centre is a doorway with a Gothic arch, and the window have square heads and cusped lights. In the middle of the upper floor is a dated plaque.	II
Noblethorpe Hall; 53.54321°N 1.57462°W	—	1838	A house that was extended in 1856, and later converted into a hotel. It is in stone, and has a floor band, a moulded eaves cornice, a parapet with vase balusters, and a segmental pediment containing decoration including a shield. There are two storeys and a symmetrical front of five bays. In the centre is a doorway with an Ionic portico and a triangular pediment. The windows are tall and are mullioned and transomed. In the left return are three French windows flanked by projecting wings with triangular pediments linked by a balustrade with vase balusters.	II
Memorial to Huskar Pit Disaster; 53.54872°N 1.56341°W		1841	The memorial is in the churchyard of All Saints Church and is to the memory of the children lost in the Huskar pit disaster. It is in sandstone, and consists of a square block with a moulded cornice on a three-stepped podium. This is surmounted by a tall pyramid with protruding gables on a square, chamfered base. On the front is carved drapery in relief and an inscription, and on the sides are the names of the children who were lost in the disaster. Around the base of the pyramid are biblical proverbs.	II
War memorial 53.54867°N 1.56414°W	—	1922	The war memorial is in limestone, and consists of a slightly tapering Latin cross on a rectangular block and a plinth on two wide steps. On the front is a relief carving of a sword in a laurel wreath. On the blocks are inscriptions, and the plinth contains the names of those lost in the two World Wars. The memorial is flanked by low attached walls at the sides and the rear.	II
Stocks; 53.54551°N 1.56385°W	—	Uncertain	The stocks are adjacent to the Ring o' Bells Public House, and were restored in 1978–79. They consist of two posts in millstone grit, grooved on the inner sides to take wooden rails; the rails were added in the restoration.	II
