= Dodworth =

Village in South Yorkshire, England

Coordinates: 53.5417°N 1.5214°W

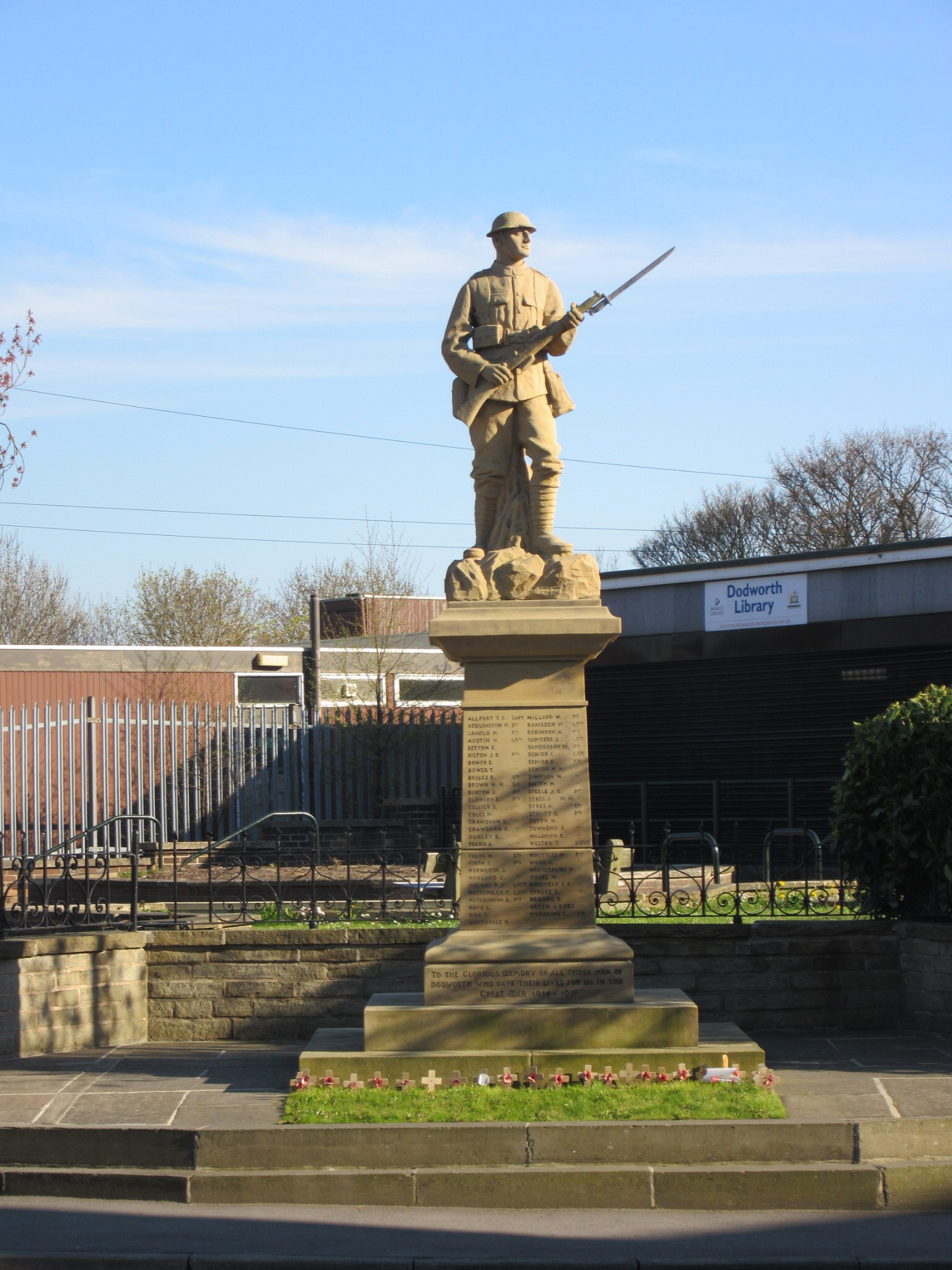
- First World War memorial in Dodworth

- Location within South Yorkshire
- Population: 10,447 (Ward 2021)
- OS grid reference: SE318051
- Metropolitan borough: Barnsley
- Metropolitan county: South Yorkshire
- Region: Yorkshire and the Humber
- Country: England
- Sovereign state: United Kingdom
- Post town: BARNSLEY
- Postcode district: S75
- Dialling code: 01226
- Police: South Yorkshire
- Fire: South Yorkshire
- Ambulance: Yorkshire
- UK Parliament: Penistone and Stocksbridge

Dodworth (/ˈdɒdəθ/ DOD-əth) is a village in the metropolitan borough of Barnsley in South Yorkshire, England. Historically part of the West Riding of Yorkshire, it has a population of 5,976 at the 2021 Census (10,447 for Dodworth Ward).

== History ==
The name Dodworth derives from an Old English personal name, such as Dod or Dodda, and worð meaning 'enclosure'.

Dodworth was historically a township in the ancient parish of Silkstone, in the Wapentake of Staincross, in the West Riding of Yorkshire. It became a separate civil parish in 1866, and an urban district in 1894. The urban district and civil parish were abolished in 1974, when Dodworth was transferred to the Metropolitan Borough of Barnsley in the new county of South Yorkshire. Dodworth is now an unparished area.

Dodworth is a former coal mining village with approximately 5,800 people. The land occupying the former pit is now the Dodworth Business Park. The "muck" stack from the pit is clearly visible throughout the village. The spoil heaps are now covered with grass, scrub and birch trees. Over the past twenty years, trees and wildlife have flourished. Now the whole of the east, south and west side are covered with trees. The north side is occupied by farmland and the former 'muck stack' is completely invisible apart from the rise.

The crossroads between High Street, Station Road and Barnsley Road lead to Barnsley and Manchester. Dodworth's High Street acted as part of a historical trade route for salt brought from Cheshire to Barnsley, proving to be one of the oldest trading routes in the area. Along High Street are a number of old weavers' cottages. Opposite the library is one of the village's oldest buildings. It dates back to 1600, with evidence of this above its High Street front door.

== Current development ==
There are established private housing estates at Baslow Crescent and Strafford Walk. Extensive newer housing is at the eastern side of Dodworth around Water Royd Drive and Rose Hill Drive. The Water Royd Drive area is often referred to as the 'In and Out' estate by locals as many commuters from outside the village see this area as having easy access to the motorway links with house prices being reflective of their desirability. Further development is to the west with new housing at Champany Fields and Green Road, and luxury flats on Barnsley Road. These new homes are popular for commuters working in Barnsley, Sheffield, Manchester, Leeds and many other centres. There is employment locally at the Dodworth Business Park and at Fall Bank Industrial Estate.

In the past few years house prices have risen sharply, reflecting the popularity of living in the village. The soon to be relocated railway station has direct lines to Huddersfield and Barnsley. A new hotel and Toby Carvery has been built on Capitol Park close to the M1 motorway junction.

The Dodworth Bypass, near junction 37 on the M1, was completed in early 2007. The bypass allows commuters to travel from central Barnsley, or the motorway, to Silkstone and surrounding areas without travelling through Dodworth. A new business park called Capitol Park, part funded through the European Objective One scheme, is under construction along the bypass.

Pharmaceutical company Galpharm International operate from a purpose-built distribution and office complex in the village.

A memorial dedicated to the miners killed in the industry has now been erected on the High Street. A charity music festival was held at the Dodworth Miners' Welfare on 3 June 2012 to raise money for the memorial fund.

== Transport ==
=== Road ===
The final section of the M1 was opened here on Friday October 18 1968, making 184 miles in length.

Proximity to the M1 Junction 37 means that Dodworth has a high proportion of commuters to Sheffield and Leeds. It also has easy access to Manchester along the A628 through Woodhead. Many people also work in Barnsley town centre, 3 miles (4.8 km) away.

There are two leading bus companies operating through Dodworth: Stagecoach and Tates. Recently there have been changes to service routes in the village, diverting buses from the main road to less populated areas.

A new road linking the motorway junction to the A628 towards Silkstone and Manchester has bypassed the village's former main thoroughfare, reducing traffic through it.

=== Railway ===
Dodworth railway station, on the Huddersfield to Sheffield line, provides access to Barnsley centre, Sheffield, Leeds and other nearby towns and cities.

== Education ==
Dodworth has two primary schools, Keresforth Primary School and Dodworth St John the Baptist CofE Primary Academy. Dodworth St John (formerly Dodworth Junior School) amalgamated with Dodworth CofE Infant School in 2002.

Local secondary schools are Horizon Community College on Dodworth Road, and Penistone Grammar School in nearby Penistone.

Dodworth Branch Library is situated on High Street next to the war memorial. It functions as a local library, and provides internet access and 'Study Support' for local children.

== Churches ==
There are three churches in Dodworth, Dodworth Methodist Church, St John the Baptist Parish Church of 1844 by Benjamin Broomhead Taylor with three military graves, and Rosehill Wesleyan Reform Church on Keresforth Road adjacent to the school.

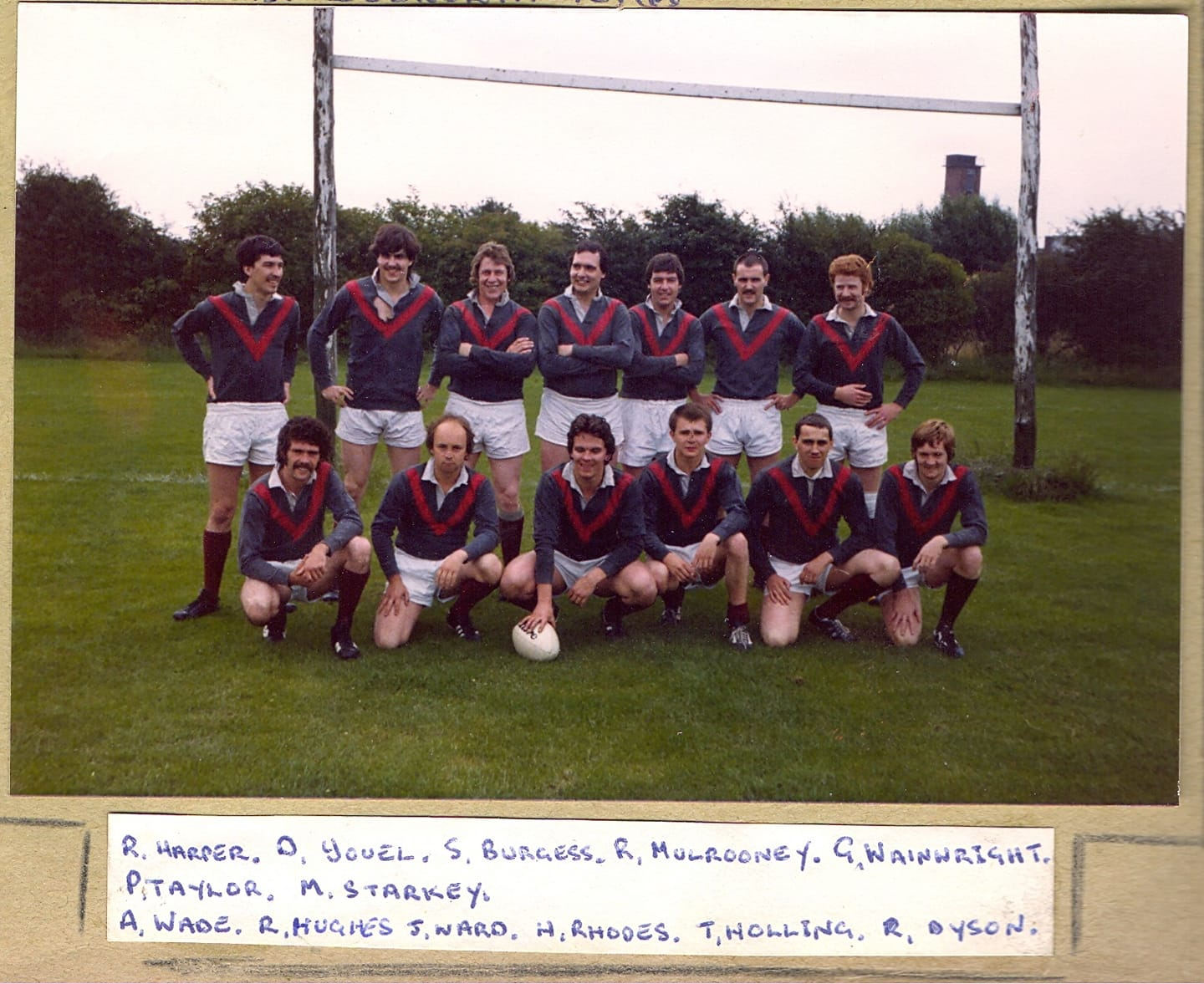
First DARLFC team before first ever game v Goldthorpe, Sep't 1980 (Dodworth win) - 2 x starters not shown, RU players not allowed by Union to play both codes

== Sport ==
Dodworth F.C. represented the village in the FA Cup during the 1920s.

Dodworth MWFC currently play in the Sheffield County Senior premier division.

Dodworth Miners ARLFC was established in 2018 and competes in the Yorkshire Men's Summer League; its predecessor Dodworth ARLFC (1980–2015) initially competed in the West Yorkshire Amateur League and later the National Conference League.

== See also ==
- Listed buildings in Dodworth
- List of Yorkshire Pits
