= Silkstone =

Village and civil parish in South Yorkshire, England

Coordinates: 53.5489°N 1.5634°W

- Village and civil parish
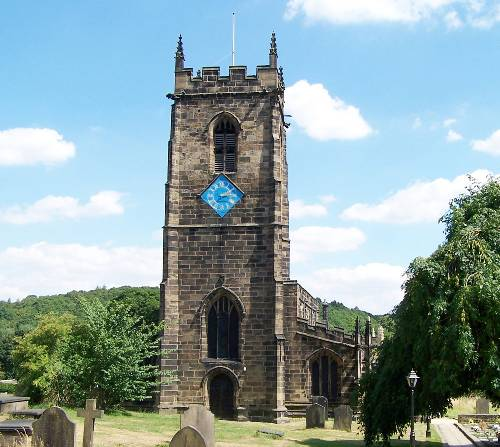
- Church of All Saints, Silkstone

- Location within South Yorkshire
- Population: 3,153 (2011)
- OS grid reference: SE289058
- Civil parish: Silkstone
- Metropolitan borough: Barnsley
- Metropolitan county: South Yorkshire
- Region: Yorkshire and the Humber
- Country: England
- Sovereign state: United Kingdom
- Post town: Barnsley
- Postcode district: S75
- Dialling code: 01226
- Police: South Yorkshire
- Fire: South Yorkshire
- Ambulance: Yorkshire
- UK Parliament: Penistone and Stocksbridge
- Website: http://www.silkstoneparishcouncil.gov.uk/

Silkstone is a village and civil parish in the Metropolitan Borough of Barnsley in South Yorkshire, England. It is situated in the foothills of the Pennines, around 4 miles west of Barnsley. The modern parish includes the neighbouring village of Silkstone Common. At the 2001 census it had a population of 2,954, increasing to 3,153 at the 2011 Census.

Silkstone Parish is twinned with Saint-Florent-des-Bois in France.

== History ==
The name Silkstone is Old English in origin and is thought to derive from the Anglo-Saxon man's name Sylc and the suffix tūn meaning a farmstead, giving "Sylc's farmstead". The earliest known written record of Silkstone is the Domesday Book of 1086, when Silkstone is referred to as a part of the manor of Cawthorne:

In Calthorne (Cawthorne) Ailric had three carucates of land to be taxed and there may be two ploughs there. The same now has it of Ilbert; himself two ploughs there, and four villanes with two ploughs. There is a vicor and a church, wood pasture two miles long and two broad; the whole manor three miles long and two broad. Value in King Edward's time forty shillings, now twenty shillings. To this manor belongs Silchestone, one carucate and a half.

The church mentioned may be a predecessor of the current Church of All Saints, the parish church in Silkstone. Silkstone parish originally included Cawthorne, West Bretton, Barnsley, Dodworth, Stainborough, Thurgoland, Hood Green, Crane Moor, Silkstone Common and Hoylandswaine.

Historically Silkstone is part of the West Riding of Yorkshire in the Wapentake of Staincross.

The Silkstone coal seam is at its shallowest in the Silkstone area, and mining was an important local industry. In 1809 the Silkstone Waggonway was built through the village by the Barnsley Canal Navigation Company. The waggonway was used to transport coal from collieries in the Silkstone valley to Cawthorne. A memorial commemorating the waggonway stands in the village.

== Sport ==
The village has sporting facilities, in the shape of the Pavilion. It is host to both a football and cricket team, with both sports being played at junior and senior levels. Silkstone is frequented by ramblers as many walking routes start from the village.

== Culture and attractions ==
The Church of All Saints was constructed in the 12th century (with alterations/renovations in the 15th and 19th centuries), it is a Grade I listed building. It is locally known as the minster of the moors. The Grade II listed Noblethorpe Hall near the village was built in the early 19th century for the Clarke family (local colliery owners). During the Second World War it was used as an army camp. Pot House Hamlet is located below Silkstone Church and was the site of an 18th-century pottery and 17th century glassworks. English Heritage have deemed this an underground national ancient monument. Pot House Hamlet today houses many independent retail outlets.

One of the village's famous sons was John Charles Brooke, Esq, FSA (1748–1794) who became Somerset Herald in 1777. He was crushed to death in a crowd at the Haymarket Theatre in London on 3 February 1794.

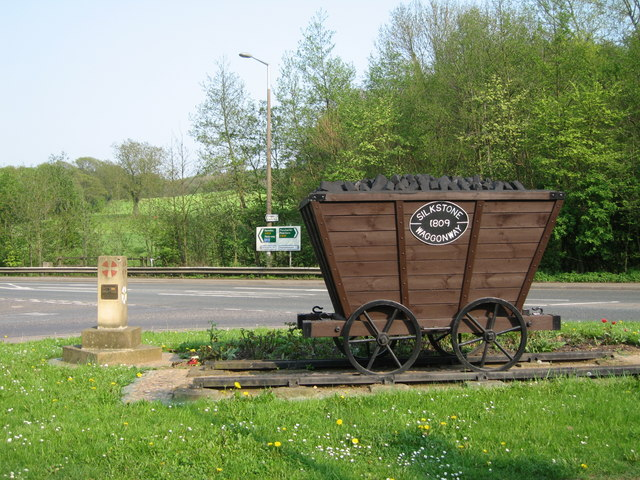
The Silkstone Wagonway Memorial

The Wagonway runs through Silkstone to the neighbouring village Cawthorne, and was used as a route for the transportation of coal from the nearby mines. The sleeper stones were originally laid in the early 19th century when coal mining was booming, and the wagonway was used until the 20th century. The stones can still be seen from the Ring O Bells pub to Pot House Hamlet. Today, the Wagonway is a scenic route ideal for country walks, with story boards, and is preserved as a historic route as part of the village's history.

The village is also home to "Old Silkstone Band" brass band. The band has a long history dating back almost 150 years. In recent times, the band has been very successful, competing for the first time in the championship section, against more famous bands like Grimethorpe and Black Dyke. The band is run without major sponsorship, and is well supported by the villages of Silkstone and Silkstone Common.

== Silkstone Common ==
Silkstone Common has Junior and Infants Schools, a railway station, a single local shop and the Station Inn.

One of the most notable events in the history of the village was the Huskar Pit Disaster, which occurred on 4 July 1838 when a freak storm flooded part of the mine, killing 26 children, the youngest was 7 years, the oldest 17. A historical account of this event has been documented in the book entitled Children of the Dark.

Notable buildings include Knabbe's Hall which was built in the late 17th century for William and Elizabeth Wood of Wortley Forge.

Silkstone Common house prices are high due to the local amenities and close proximity to Penistone Grammar School.

== See also ==
- Listed buildings in Silkstone
