= Church of All Saints, Silkstone =

All Saints' Church, Silkstone
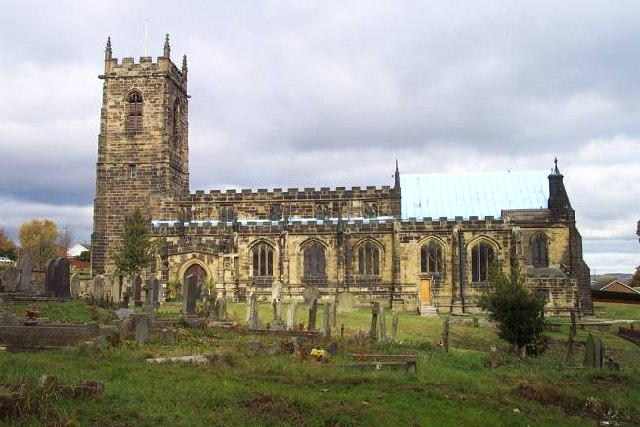
- All Saints' Church, Silkstone
- 53.5484°N 1.5625°W
- OS grid reference: SE 29086 05844
- Location: Silkstone
- Country: England
- Denomination: Church of England
- Churchmanship: Broad Church

Administration
- Province: Province of York
- Diocese: Diocese of Leeds
- Parish: Silkstone

The Church of All Saints is the parish church in the village of Silkstone in South Yorkshire, England. It is a Church of England church in the Diocese of Leeds. The building is Grade I listed and dates back to at least the 12th century.

== History ==
There may have been a church on this site in Saxon times, but the current perpendicular style building was originally constructed in the 12th century. The building was remodelled in 1495, and the chancel was rebuilt in 1852–1858. The church contains a ring of 6 bells.

== See also ==
- Grade I listed buildings in South Yorkshire
- Listed buildings in Silkstone
