= Silkstone Common =

Village in South Yorkshire, England

Coordinates: 53.5355°N 1.5622°W

- Village
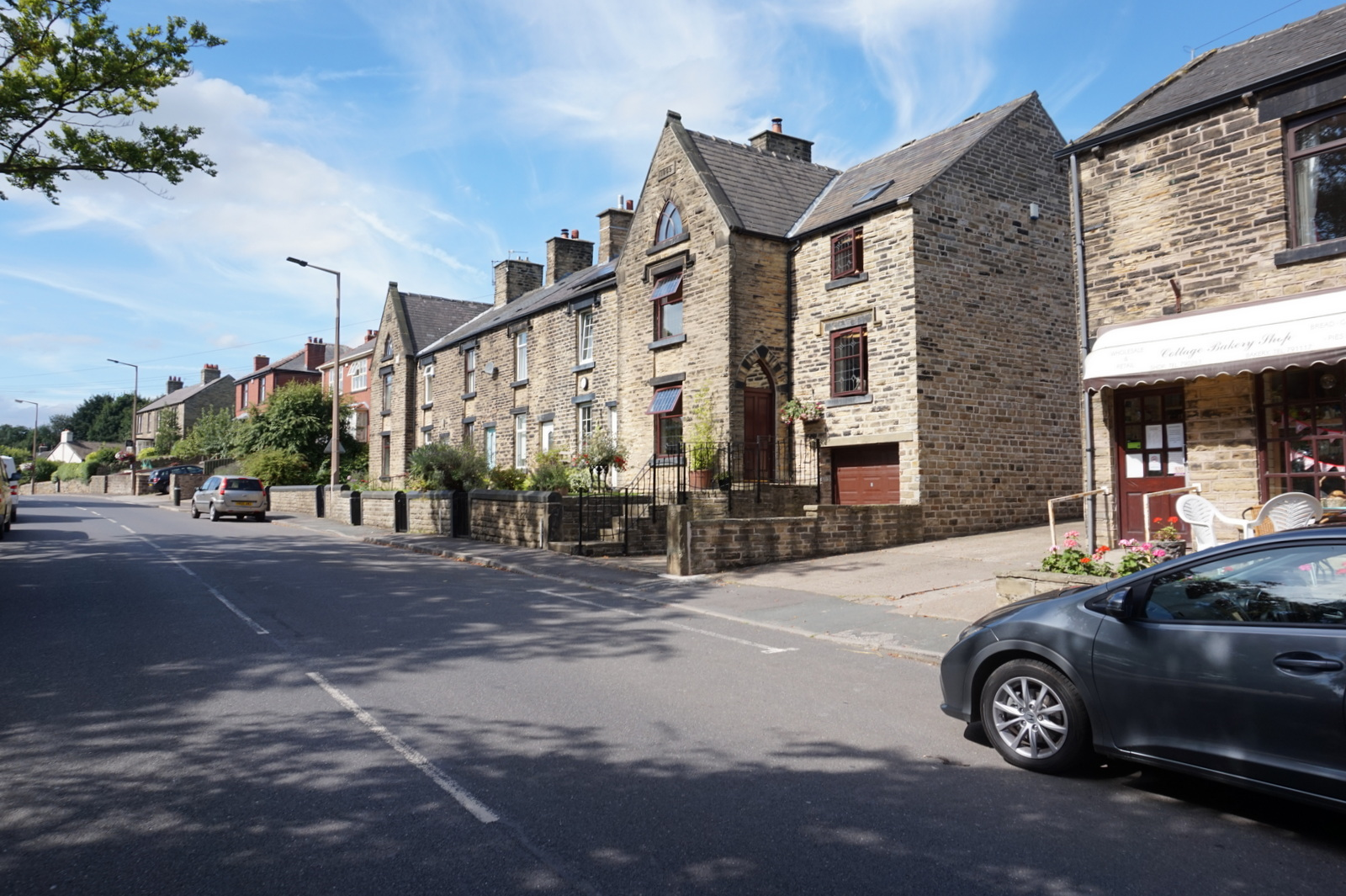
- Ben Bank Road

- Location within South Yorkshire
- Population: 2,954 (2001 Census)
- OS grid reference: SE290044
- Civil parish: Silkstone
- Metropolitan borough: Barnsley
- Metropolitan county: South Yorkshire
- Region: Yorkshire and the Humber
- Country: England
- Sovereign state: United Kingdom
- Police: South Yorkshire
- Fire: South Yorkshire
- Ambulance: Yorkshire
- UK Parliament: Penistone and Stocksbridge
- Website: http://www.silkstoneparishcouncil.gov.uk

Silkstone Common is a village in the metropolitan borough of Barnsley in South Yorkshire, England. It is to the south of Silkstone.

== History ==
One of the most notable events in the history of the village was the Huskar Pit Disaster, which occurred on 4 July 1838 when a freak storm flooded part of the mine, killing 26 children; the youngest was 7 years, the oldest 17. A historical account of this event has been documented in the book entitled Children of the Dark.

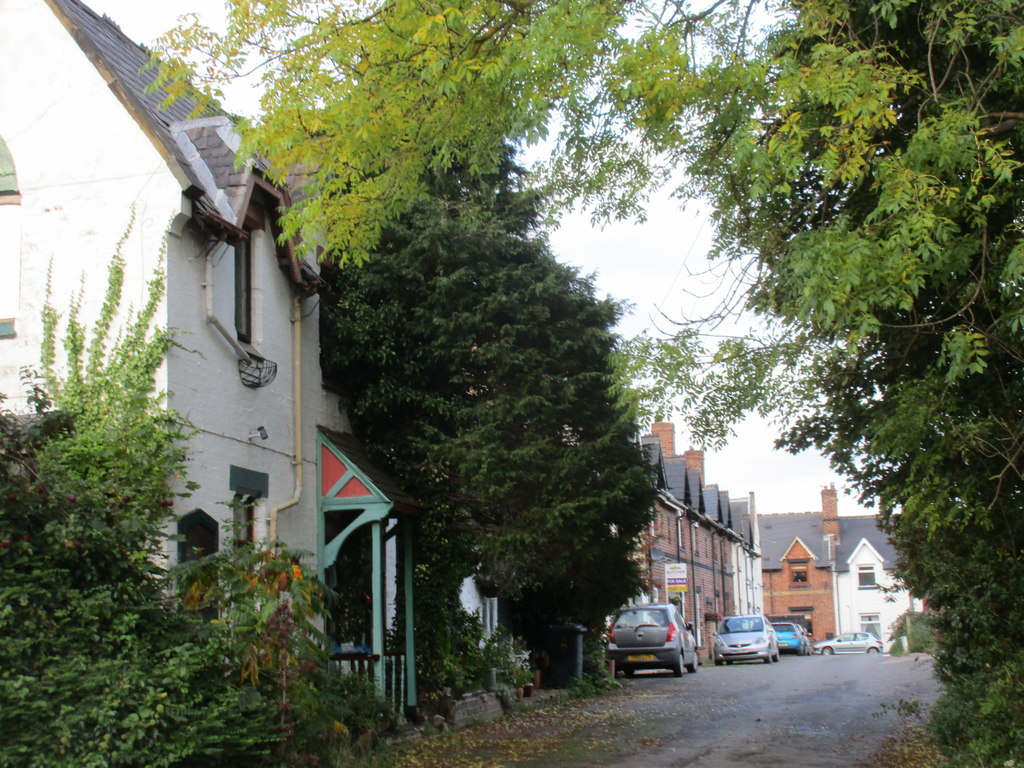
South Yorkshire Buildings

In 1877, the South Yorkshire Coal and Iron Company built a planned housing development in southwest Silkstone Common called the South Yorkshire Buildings. The buildings are "laid out in a regular pattern surrounded by small allotment gardens" as opposed to "the rest of the settlement, which consists of terraces strung out along existing roads".

Historically Silkstone Common is part of the West Riding of Yorkshire in the Wapentake of Staincross, in the ancient parish of Silkstone.

== Transport ==
Silkstone Common is served by the railway station of the same name, which opened in 1852. Silkstone Waggonway extends to Silkstone Common. There is also the Station Inn.

== Education ==
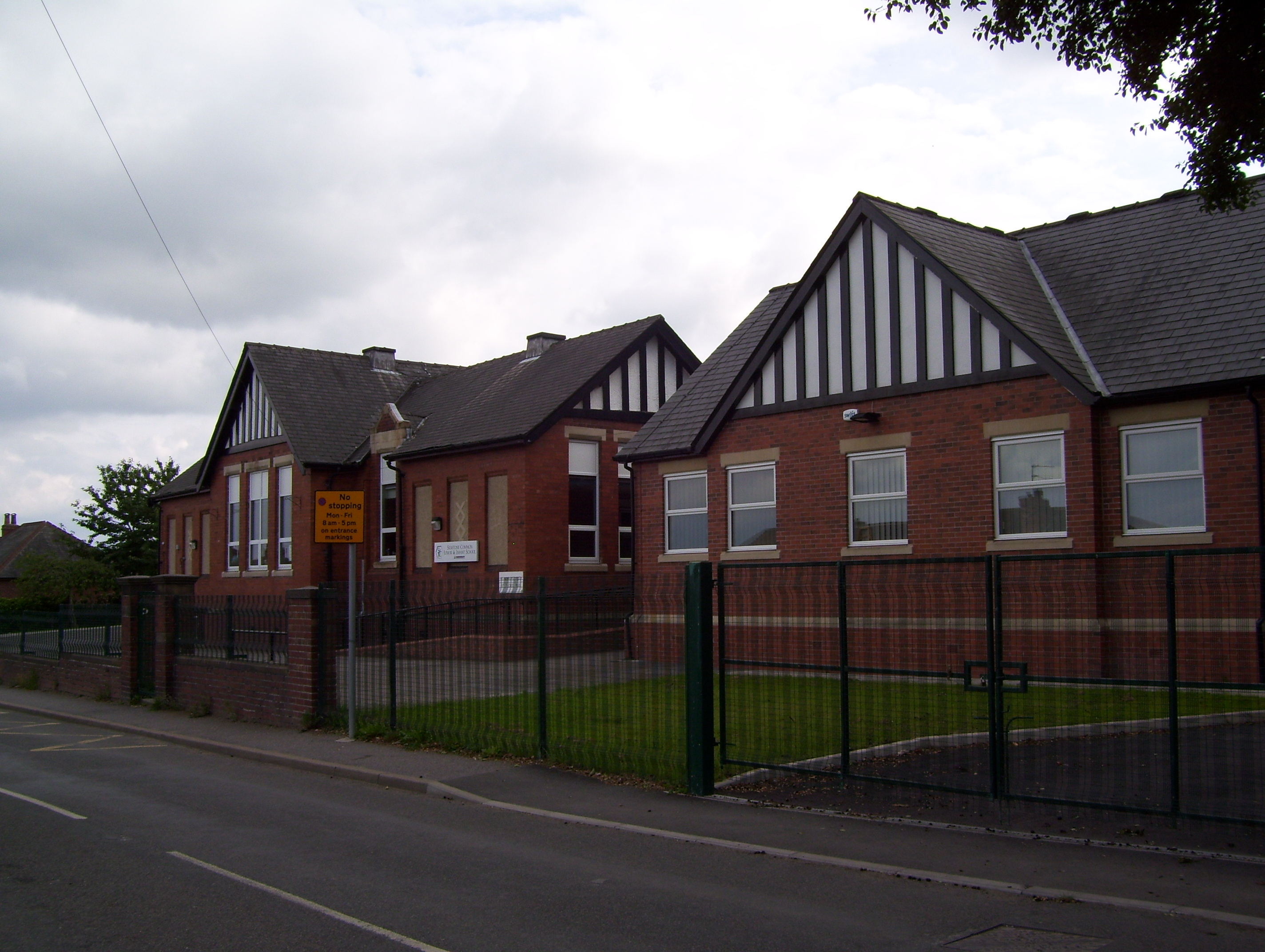
Silkstone Common Junior & Infant School

The village has a Junior and Infants School. It is also in close proximity to Penistone Grammar School.

== Amenities ==
Silkstone Common is home to one pub, The Station and one shop, the Cottage Bakery Shop.

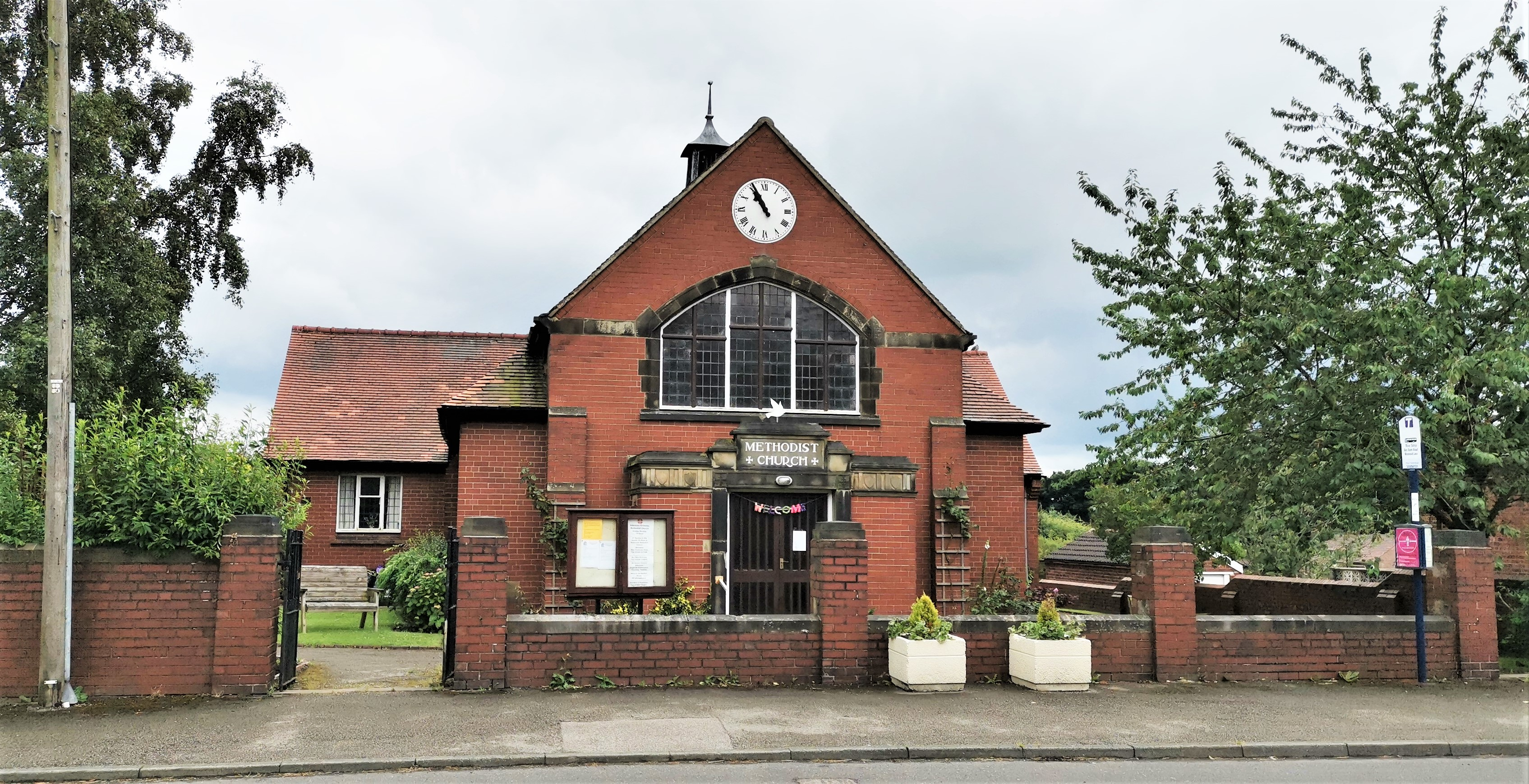
Methodist Church, Silkstone Common

The village has a Methodist Church, now closed. The Parish Council are investigating the purchase of the building for village use.

Notable buildings include Knabb's Hall which was built in late 17th century for William and Elizabeth Wood of Wortley Forge, and the Old Station House, a building located directly beside the railway line which once housed the railway owner but now functions as a residential building.
