= Wentworth Castle =

Country house in Stainborough, South Yorkshire, England

Coordinates: 53.5243°N 1.5188°W

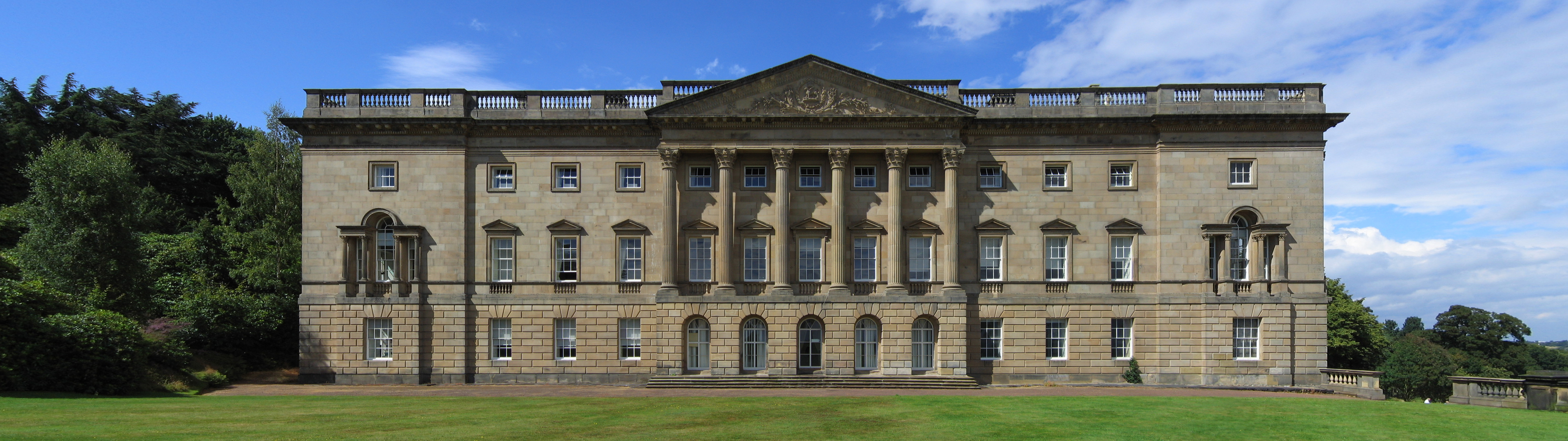
Wentworth Castle: Horace Walpole found the south front (finished 1764) evinced "the most perfect taste in architecture".

Wentworth Castle is a grade-I listed country house, the former seat of the Earls of Strafford, at Stainborough, near Barnsley in South Yorkshire, England. It is now home to the Northern College for Residential and Community Education.

An older house existed on the estate, then called Stainborough, when it was purchased by Thomas Wentworth, Baron Raby (later Earl of Strafford), in 1708. It was still called Stainborough in Jan Kip's engraved bird's-eye view of parterres and avenues, 1714, and in the first edition of Vitruvius Britannicus, 1715. The name was changed in 1731. The original name survives in the form of Stainborough Castle, a sham ruin constructed as a garden folly on the estate.

The estate was in the care of the Wentworth Castle Heritage Trust from 2001 to June 2019 and was open to the public year-round seven days a week. Despite massive restoration, the castle gardens were closed to the public in 2017 amidst a funding crisis. In September 2018 it was announced that the National Trust planned to enter into a new partnership with Northern College and Barnsley Metropolitan Borough Council to reopen the gardens and parkland to the public. The gardens and parkland reopened to the public on 8 June 2019.

== History ==
The original house, known as the Cutler house, was constructed for Sir Gervase Cutler (born 1640) in 1670. Sir Gervase then sold the estate to Thomas Wentworth, later the 1st Earl of Strafford (of the 2nd creation). The house was remodelled in two great campaigns, by two earls, in remarkably different styles, each time under unusual circumstances.

== First building campaign ==
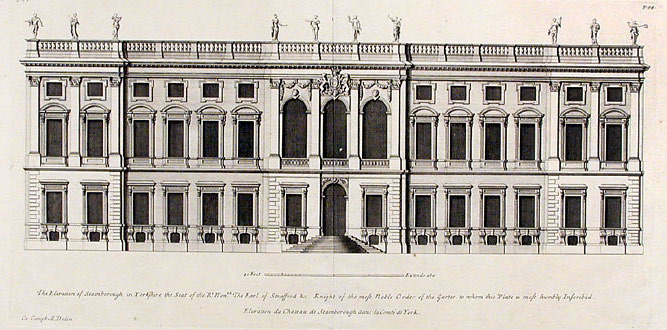
East front of Stainborough (Wentworth Castle) in Vitruvius Britannicus I (1715)

The first building campaign to upgrade the original structure was initiated c. 1711 by Thomas Wentworth, Baron Raby (1672–1739). He was the grandson of Sir William Wentworth, 1st Baronet, father of Thomas Wentworth, the attainted 1st Earl. Raby was himself created 1st Earl of Strafford (second creation) in 1711.

The estate of Wentworth Woodhouse, which he believed was his birthright, was scarcely six miles distant and was a constant bitter sting, for the Strafford fortune had passed from William Wentworth, 2nd Earl of Strafford, the childless son of the great earl, to his wife's nephew, Thomas Watson; only the barony of Raby had gone to a blood-relation. M. J. Charlesworth surmises that it was a feeling that what by right should have been his that motivated Wentworth's purchase of Stainborough Castle nearby and that his efforts to surpass the Watsons at Wentworth Woodhouse in splendour and taste motivated the man whom Jonathan Swift called "proud as Hell".

Wentworth had been a soldier in the service of William III, who made him a colonel of dragoons. He was sent by Queen Anne as ambassador to Prussia in 1705–11 and on his return to Britain, the earldom was revived when he was created Viscount Wentworth and Earl of Strafford in the Peerage of Great Britain. He was then sent as a representative in the negotiations that led to the Treaty of Utrecht, and was brought before a commission of Parliament in the aftermath. With the death of Queen Anne, he and the Tories were permanently out of power. Wentworth, representing a clannish old family of Yorkshire, required a grand house consonant with the revived Wentworth fortunes. He spent his years of retirement completing it and enriching his landscape.

Wentworth had broken his tour of duty at Berlin to conclude the purchase of Stainborough in the summer of 1708, and returned to Berlin, armed with sufficient specifications of the site to engage the services of a military architect who had spent some years recently in England, Johann von Bodt. who provided the designs. Wentworth was in Italy in 1709, buying paintings for the future house: "I have great credit by my pictures," he reported with satisfaction: "They are all designed for Yorkshire, and I hope to have a better collection there than Mr. Watson." To display them a grand gallery would be required, for which James Gibbs must have provided the designs, since a contract for wainscoting "as desined by Mr Gibbs" survives among Wentworth papers in the British Library (Add MS 22329, folio 128). The Gallery was completed in 1724. There are designs, probably by Bodt, for an elevation and a section showing the gallery at Wentworth Castle in the Victoria and Albert Museum (E.307–1937), in an album of mixed drawings which belonged to William Talman's son John. the gallery extends 180 feet, 24 feet wide, and 30 high, screened into three divisions by veined marble Corinthian columns with gilded capitals, and with corresponding pilasters against projecting piers: in the intervening spaces four marble copies of Roman sculptures on block plinths survived until the twentieth century.

Construction was sufficiently advanced by March–April 1714 that surviving correspondence between Strafford and William Thornton concerned the disposition of panes in the window sashes: the options were for windows four panes wide, as done in the best houses Thornton assured the Earl, for which crown glass would do, or for larger panes, three panes across, which might require plate glass: Strafford opted for the latter. The results, directed largely by letter from a distance, are unique in Britain. Sir Nikolaus Pevsner found the east range "of a palatial splendour uncommon in England." The grand suite of parade rooms on the ground floor extended from the room at the north end with a ceiling allegory of Plenty to the south end, with one of a Fame.

Bodt's use of a giant order of pilasters on the front and other features, suggested to John Harris that Bodt, who had been in England in the 1690s, had had access to drawings by William Talman. Talman was the architect of Chatsworth, considered to be England's first truly Baroque house. Indeed, there are similarities of design between Wentworth's east front and Chatsworth. Both have a distinctly Continental Baroque frontage. Wentworth has been described as "a remarkable and almost unique example of Franco-Prussian architecture in Georgian England". The east front was built upon a raised terrace that descended to sweeps of gravelled ramps that flanked a grotto and extended in an axial vista framed by double allées of trees to a formal wrought iron gate, all seen in Jan Kip's view of 1714, which if it is not more plan than reality, includes patterned parterres to the west of the house and an exedra on rising ground behind, all features that appear again in Britannia Illustrata, (1730). An engraving by Thomas Badeslade from about 1750 still shows the formal features centred on Bodt's façade, enclosed in gravel drives wide enough for a coach-and-four. The regular plantations of trees planted bosquet-fashion have matured: their edges are clipped, and straight rides pierce them. All these were swept away by the 2nd Earl after mid-century, in favour of an open, rolling "naturalistic" landscape in the manner of Capability Brown.

== First earl's landscape ==
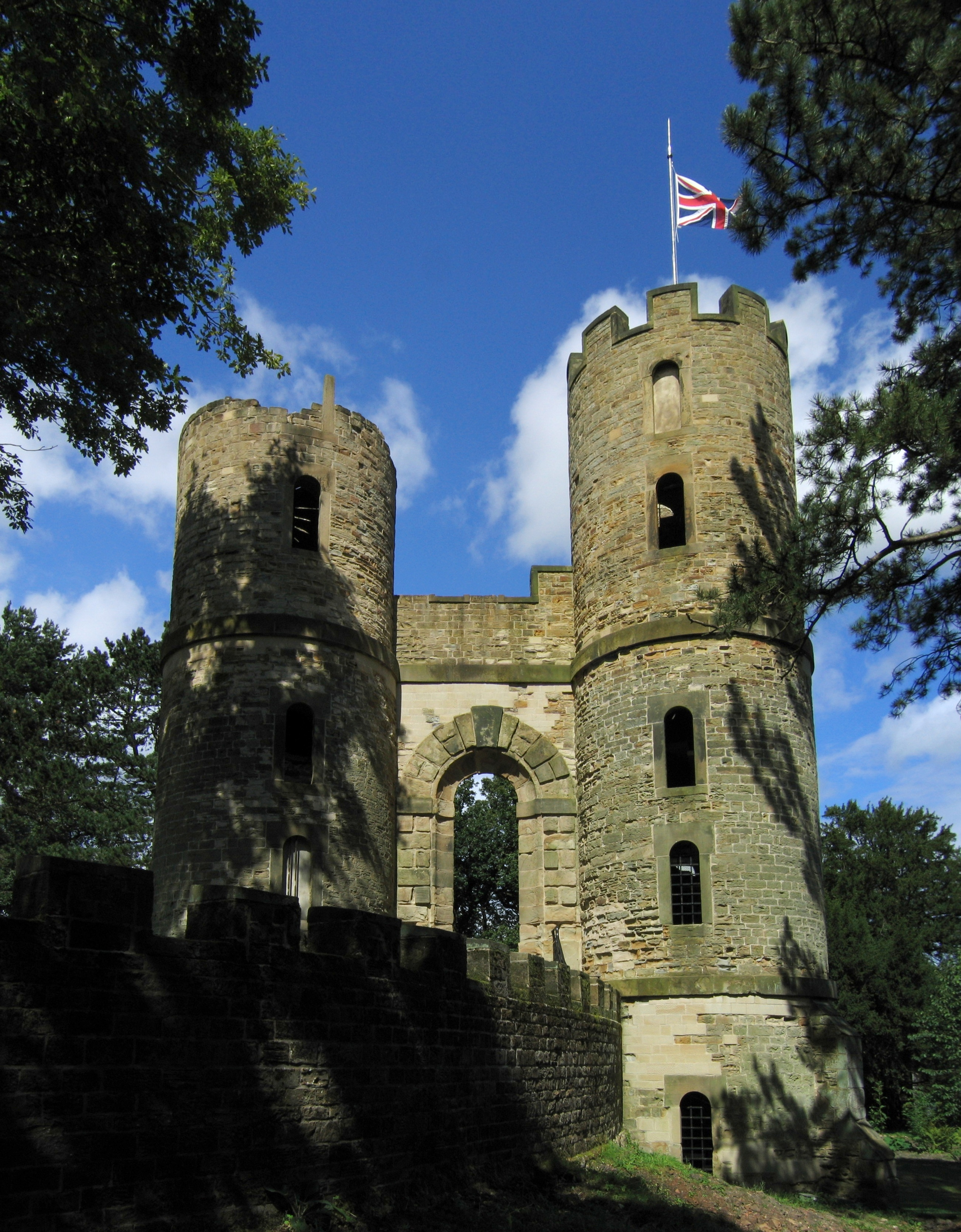
"Stainborough Castle" an early example (finished 1730) of a mock ruin as an eyecatcher in the landscape; two of four towers remain.

Thomas Wentworth, 1st Earl of Strafford planted avenues of trees in great quantity in this open countryside, and the sham castle folly (built from 1726 and inscribed "Rebuilt in 1730", now more ruinous than it was at first) that he placed at the highest site, "like an endorsement from the past" and kept free of trees missed by only a few years being the first sham castle in an English landscape garden. For its central court where the four original towers were named for his four children, the Earl commissioned his portrait statue in 1730 from Michael Rysbrack, whom James Gibbs had been the first to employ when he came to England; the statue has been moved closer to the house.

A staunch Tory, Lord Strafford remained in political obscurity during Walpole's Whig supremacy, for the remainder of his life. An obelisk was erected to the memory of Queen Anne in 1734, and a sitting room in the house was named "Queen Anne's Sitting Room" until modern times. Other landscape features were added, one after the other, with the result that today there are twenty-six listed structures in what remains of the parkland.

== 2nd Earl at Wentworth Castle ==
The 1st Earl died in 1739 and his son succeeded him. William Wentworth, 2nd Earl of Strafford (1722–1791) rates an entry in Howard Colvin's Biographical Dictionary of British Architects as the designer of the fine neo-Palladian range, built in 1759–64 (illustration, upper right). He married a daughter of John Campbell, 2nd Duke of Argyll and spent a year on the Grand Tour to improve his taste; he eschewed political life. At Wentworth Castle he had John Platt (1728–1810) on the site as master mason and Charles Ross ( –1770/75) to draft the final drawings and act as "superintendent"; Ross was a carpenter and joiner of London who had worked under the Palladian architect and practised architectural amanuensis, Matthew Brettingham, at Strafford's London house, 5, St James's Square, in 1748–49. Ross's proven competency in London in London doubtless recommended him to the Earl for the building campaign in Yorkshire. At Wentworth Castle it was generally understood, as James Grimston, 4th Viscount Grimston remarked in 1768, "'Lord Strafford himself is his own architect and contriver in everything." Even in the London house, Horace Walpole tells us, "he chose all the ornaments himself".

Walpole singled out Wentworth Castle as a paragon for the perfect integration of the site, the landscape, even the harmony of the stone:

"If a model is sought of the most perfect taste in architecture, where grace softens dignity, and lightness attempers magnificence... where the position is the most happy, and even the colour of the stone the most harmonious; the virtuoso should be directed to the new front of Wentworth-castle: the result of the same judgement that had before distributed so many beauties over that domain and called from wood, water, hills, prospects, and buildings, a compendium of picturesque nature, improved by the chastity of art."

== Later history ==
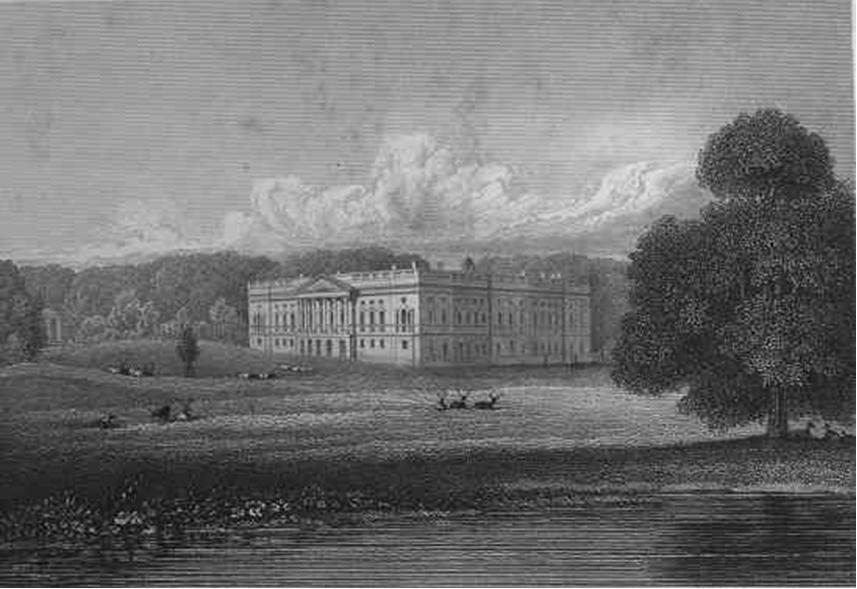
Early 19th century print of the castle showing both the south and east façades

With the extinction of the earldom following the death of Frederick Wentworth, 3rd Earl of Strafford in 1799, the huge family estates were divided into three, one-third going to the descendants of each daughter of the 1st Earl. Wentworth Castle was left in trust for Lady Henrietta Vernon's grandson Frederick Vernon, (of Hilton Hall, Staffordshire) whose trustees were William Fitzwilliam, 4th Earl Fitzwilliam, and Walter Spencer Stanhope. Frederick Vernon added Wentworth to his surname and took charge of the estate in 1816. Between 1820 and 1840, the old chapel of St. James was replaced with the current building and the windows of the Baroque Wing were lowered on either side of the entrance hall. Frederick Vernon Wentworth also amalgamated two ground floor rooms to make what is now the blue room. In July 1838, a freak hailstorm badly damaged the cupola and windows of the house as well as all the greenhouses within the walled gardens, yet this pales into insignificance when compared with the nearby Huskar Colliery disaster where 26 child miners lost their lives due to flooding following the hailstorm.

In May 1853, a freak snowstorm also caused severe damage, particularly to the mature trees within the gardens, some of them rare species from America planted by the 1st and 2nd earls. Frederick Vernon Wentworth was succeeded by his son Thomas in 1885 who added the iron framed Conservatory and electric lighting by March of the following year. The Victorian Wing also dates from this decade and its construction allowed the Vernon-Wentworths to entertain the young Prince Albert Victor, Duke of Clarence and Avondale and his entourage during the winters of 1887 and 1889. The estate was inherited by Thomas' eldest son, Captain Bruce Vernon-Wentworth, MP for Brighton, in 1902. Preferring his Suffolk estates, the Captain put the most valuable of his Wentworth Castle house contents up for sale at auction with Christie's after the First World War. The paintings sold at Christie's on 13 November 1919.

Bruce Vernon-Wentworth, who had no direct heirs, sold the house and its gardens to Barnsley Corporation in 1948, while the rest of his estates, in Yorkshire, Suffolk and Scotland were left to a distant cousin. The remaining contents of Wentworth Castle were emptied at a house sale, and the house became a teacher training college, the Wentworth Castle College of Education, until 1978. It was then used by Northern College. It was featured in the Victoria and Albert Museum's exhibition "The Country House in Danger". The great landscape that Walpole praised in 1780 was described in 1986 as now "disturbed and ruinous" with several listed structures put on English Heritage's at-risk registry. The 2nd Earl's sinuous river excavated in the 1730s was reduced to a series of silty ponds.

Wentworth Castle Gardens, the only Grade I-listed parkland in South Yorkshire, underwent £20m worth of investment from 2002 to 2017. The Wentworth Castle Heritage Trust was formed in 2002 as a charity with the aim "to undertake a phased programme of restoration and development works which will provide benefit to the general public by providing extensive access to the parkland and gardens and the built heritage, conserving these important heritage assets for future generations." The restoration of the Rotunda was completed in 2010 and the parkland has been returned to deer park.

The estate opened fully to visitors in 2007, following the completion of the first phase of restoration, which cost £15.2 million, Further restoration was completed in 2014.

Wentworth Castle was featured on the BBC Television show Restoration in 2003, when a bid was made to restore the Grade II* Listed Victorian conservatory to its former glory, though it did not win in the viewers' response. Subsequently, the Wentworth Castle Heritage Trust took the decision in 2005 to support the fragile structure further with a scaffold in order to prevent its total collapse. The Trust succeeded in raising the £3.7 million needed to restore the conservatory in 2011 and work began in 2012, with grants from English Heritage, the Country Houses Foundation, the Heritage Lottery Fund and the European Regional Development Fund. The Trust completed the restoration of its fragile Victorian glasshouse in October 2013 – 10 years after its first TV appearance the Restoration series. It was opened by the Mayor of Barnsley on 7 November 2013 and opened to the general public the following day.

Despite attracting tens of thousands of visitors a year, Wentworth Castle Gardens was forced to close in the spring of 2017. During the closure years a small team of gardeners and a group of community volunteers carried out essential maintenance of the gardens and curated an archive of material about the site's history.

In September 2018 it was announced that the National Trust planned to enter into a new partnership with Northern College and Barnsley Metropolitan Borough Council to reopen the gardens and parkland to the public in 2019.

On Saturday 8 June 2019 the gardens and parkland were reopened under the care and management of the National Trust. The site is open year-round except for Christmas Day. The Partnership between the National Trust, Northern College and Barnsley Metropolitan Borough Council delivers a programme of cultural and environmental events at Wentworth Castle and other sites managed by Barnsley Museums.

== See also ==
- Grade I listed buildings in South Yorkshire
- Listed buildings in Stainborough
