= Stainborough =

Civil parish in South Yorkshire, England

Coordinates: 53°31′N 1°30′W

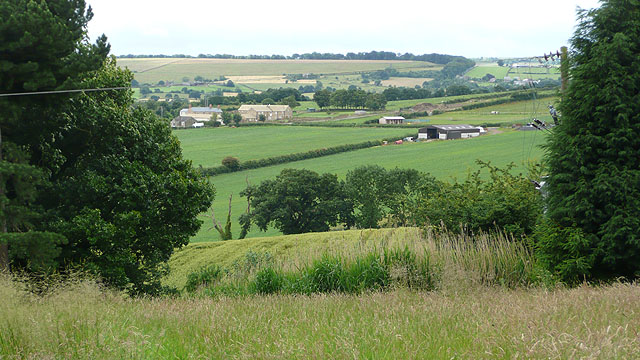
Stainborough Fold viewed from Stainborough Castle

Stainborough is a civil parish in the Metropolitan Borough of Barnsley in South Yorkshire, England. At the 2001 census it had a population of 399, reducing slightly to 390 at the 2011 Census.

The village of Stainborough and Hood Green lie within the Stainborough Civil Parish.

Historically, Stainborough was part of the ancient Parish of Silkstone, in the Wapentake of Staincross, in the historic county of Yorkshire West Riding.

== See also ==
- Listed buildings in Stainborough
