= Pen and Sword Books =

British speciality and history book and magazine publisher

- Pen and Sword Books logo
- Parent company: Barnsley Chronicle
- Status: Active
- Predecessor: Leo Cooper
- Founded: 1990; 36 years ago
- Country of origin: United Kingdom
- Headquarters location: Barnsley, South Yorkshire, England
- Distribution: Self-distributed (UK); Casemate Publishers (US) (Note: Note all titles are distributed in the US; only 2,892 books (as of December 2020) are available from Casemate Publishers.); Peribo (Australia)
- Publication types: Books, magazines
- Nonfiction topics: Military history, naval and maritime history, aviation, local history, family history, collectables and antiques, nostalgia and true crime
- Imprints: Air World; Frontline Books; Green Bean Books; Seaforth Publishing; White Owl
- Official website: www.pen-and-sword.co.uk

Pen and Sword Books, also stylised as Pen & Sword, is a British publisher which specialises in printing and distributing books in both hardback and softback on military history, militaria and other niche subjects, primarily focused on the United Kingdom. Pen and Sword has over 6,000 titles available in print, and also available as ebook download. Releasing 500 new titles each year on a variety of subjects, it is part of the Barnsley Chronicle newspaper group.

== History ==
The first books produced by the company were in response to public demand, following a series of articles first published weekly in the Barnsley Chronicle. Dark Peak Aircraft Wrecks told the story of crash sites in the Dark Peak area of the Peak District National Park, and a further weekly feature on the history of two Kitchener battalions, known as the Barnsley Pals, aroused a public interest. Over the years these books have been reprinted a number of times.

Following on from the success of the Dark Peak and Barnsley Pals books, a number of local history paperbacks were produced, along with a series of battlefield guide books. Battleground Europe proved successful, and as more titles were produced, the company made the decision to launch a book publishing arm of the group.

When the Leo Cooper imprint became available, the Barnsley Chronicle purchased it; and the Pen and Sword publishing house was established in 1990. Leo Cooper (1934–2013), the late husband of novelist Jilly Cooper, had established a reputation for publishing military history titles. Leo Cooper later retired.

Pen and Sword expanded its subject matter, branching out to cover naval and maritime history, aviation, local history, family history, collectables and antiques, nostalgia and true crime. It further expanded to include transport and railways, science, archaeology, exploration, and political memoirs. In 2008, Pen and Sword made two acquisitions: Frontline Books, which focuses on United States–based military history; and Seaforth Publishing, which is a leading maritime history imprint.

== Select series ==
- "Aviation Heritage Trail": stories, history and events behind famous aviation operations;
- "Battleground Europe": over 100 illustrated battleground guide books from periods including 1066, Wars of the Roses, the English Civil War, Napoleonic, Zulu War, The Boer War, World War I to World War II;
- "Classics": books covering military operations and stories from many different periods throughout history;
- "Cold War 1945–1991": a series of 19 books (as of December 2020) documenting individual battles around the world during the period from 1945 to 1991, known as the Cold War;
- "FlightCraft": 18 books (as of December 2020) focussing on significant military aircraft from the United Kingdom, Germany, the United States of America, and Russia; primarily during the early part of the Cold War;
- "History of Terror": a series of 15 books (as of December 2020) documenting significant episodes of terror from the last two millennium; titles include: Emperors of Rome: The Monsters, detailing the 'bad' Roman emperors from AD 14 to 548 (Note: ISBN 9781526728852); Irgun, about fanatical Zionists who wish to convert Palestine and Transjordan into an independent Jewish state from 1931 to 1948 (Note: ISBN 9781526728692); Northern Ireland: The Troubles, an intimate documentation of paramilitary operations on the island of Ireland, and the quest to quash them, in a period known as 'The Troubles' from 1968 to 1998 (Note: ISBN 9781526729170); and Al Qaeda in the Islamic Maghreb, about the al Qaeda insurgencies in Afghanistan, Iraq, Syria, and the Yemen, along with splinter jihadist groups in West Africa and Europe, from 2007 (Note: ISBN 9781526728739);
- "Holt's Guidebooks": overview general information books with maps, memorials, battleground descriptions and tourist-focused summaries covering varied military campaigns from World War I and World War II;
- "Napoleonic Library": a series of 27 books (as of December 2020) dedicated to the people, equipment and battles from the Napoleonic Wars;
- "Pals": narratives documenting the lives of friends, comrades, and pals, who joined together in the same Battalions to serve King and Country during the Great War
- "ShipCraft": a series of 30 books (as of December 2020) documenting military battleships, cruisers, destroyers, frigates, sloops, and aircraft carriers; along with the great passenger liners such as the Titanic and her sisters;
- "TankCraft": 28 books (as of December 2020) documenting in significant detail the tracked warfare vehicles commonly known as tanks; from Britain, Germany, and America;
- "Warships of the Royal Navy": stories behind famous Royal Navy (RN) ships from the Napoleonic Wars to contemporary military conflicts;
- "Images of War": a major series of 243 books (as of December 2020) of rare photographs from wartime archives of every possible global military subject, from animals and aircraft to the Waffen SS and Winston Churchill; including concentration and death camps, individual battles, squadrons, battalions and divisions, the people, and the equipment they flew, sailed and operated, on the ground, in the air, and at sea; in all theatres of war since World War One; all with detailed captions and references;
- Shot in the Tower: The Story of the Spies Executed in the Tower of London During the First World War.
