= Listed buildings in Barnsley (Kingstone Ward) =

Kingstone is a ward in the metropolitan borough of Barnsley, South Yorkshire, England. The ward contains eight listed buildings that are recorded in the National Heritage List for England. Of these, one is listed at Grade II*, the middle of the three grades, and the others are at Grade II, the lowest grade. The ward is to the southwest of the centre of Barnsley, and is residential. It contains Locke Park, with three listed buildings, a statue, a tower and a bandstand. The other listed buildings are a church, a former stable block, a former public swimming baths, a guest house, and the churchyard walls and railings of a demolished church.

== Key ==
Grade	Criteria
II*	Particularly important buildings of more than special interest
II	Buildings of national importance and special interest

== Buildings ==
Name and location	Photograph	Date	Notes	Grade
Stable block to Keresforth Hall; 53.53911°N 1.49704°W	—	1821	The former stable block is rendered, with a floor band, and a hipped Welsh slate roof with ornamental cresting. There are two storeys at the front and one at the rear, and a later gabled wing on the right. The middle three bays project under a pediment containing a blind lunette with alternately blocked voussoirs and a dated keystone. The windows are casements, and some openings have been altered. In the middle of the roof is a louvred ventilator with an ornamental weathervane. At the rear are two cart sheds, two oculi, and a central canopy.	II
Gatepiers, gates, walls and railings, St George's Church; 53.55060°N 1.48563°W	—	c. 1821	The churchyard of the former church is enclosed by a low stone wall with shaped coping, and arcaded cast iron railings with ornamental finials. The gateway is flanked by octagonal piers with plinths, moulded caps, and an iron overthrow. The iron gates are simple, and in the north wall is a small gateway with an overthrow.	II
Statue of Joseph Locke and enclosure 53.54394°N 1.48875°W		1866	The statue in Locke Park was designed by Carlo Marochetti, and commemorates the railway engineer Joseph Locke. It is in bronze, and is an over-life depiction of Locke standing on a square red granite pedestal, with his name engraved on the front. The statue is in a Portland stone enclosure, consisting of a balustrade with square corner piers and ornamental capitals.	II
Former Public Baths; 53.55131°N 1.48634°W		1872	The former public swimming baths, caretaker's house, and pool at the rear, are in stone, and have a Welsh slate roof with coped gables. At the front are two storeys and an attic, and a symmetrical front of five bays, the central three bays projecting, the middle bay furthest. In the second and fourth bays are round-arched portals with pilaster jambs, engaged colonnettes, and pointed hood moulds. Above are single-light windows, the other windows on the front have two lights, and all have pointed hood moulds. The middle bay is gabled with a small attic window. Along the top of the building is a Lombard frieze and a parapet that mainly contains round arches, and has corbelled round corner piers. Behind the central gable is a small pyramidal roof. At the rear is a tall tapering ornamental chimney, square at the base, octagonal at the top, with bands, a moulded cornice, and a cap.	II
Park View Guest House; 53.54163°N 1.49121°W	—	1873	A pair of houses, later combined, in concrete, with a flat concrete roof. There are four storeys, and in the centre of the front and rear are two four-storey canted bay windows. Outside these, on the front, are doorways approached by steps with a balustrade, and a porch with columns carrying round arches and an openwork baluster. The door is round-headed, and all the windows are sashes.	II
Locke Park Tower; 53.54137°N 1.48462°W		1877	The tower, on the highest point in the park, was designed by Richard Phené Spiers, and has four stages. At the base is a circular stone podium on which are 14 stone Ionic columns with terracotta capitals, carrying an entablature with a red stone frieze. Above this is a balcony with terracotta panels between stone piers, behind which the tower has banded rustication and an entablature. The third stage is a drum with four Corinthian pilasters, and an entablature with a decorated frieze. The top stage is a wooden arcaded lantern with a conical copper-clad roof and a finial.	II*
St Edward's Church; 53.54439°N 1.49258°W		1900–02	The church is in stone with a slate roof, and is in Early English style. It consists of a nave with a clerestory, north and south aisles, north and south porches, north and south transepts, a chancel, and a tower at the crossing. The tower has corner buttresses rising to form towers with pyramidal roofs, a clock face on the north side, and an open arcaded parapet, and it is surmounted by a pyramidal roof with a lead cap and a cross finial. The east and west windows have five lights.	II
Bandstand, Locke Park; 53.54214°N 1.48881°W		1908	The bandstand has an octagonal plan, with eight ornamental cast iron columns on a low brick base carrying a felt-covered ogee dome with a lead-covered cap. The columns have foliated capitals, and elaborate openwork brackets that carry an openwork arcaded frieze.	II

== See also ==
- Listed buildings in Barnsley
