= Locke Park =

Park in Barnsley, South Yorkshire, England

Coordinates: 53.54292°N 1.48825°W

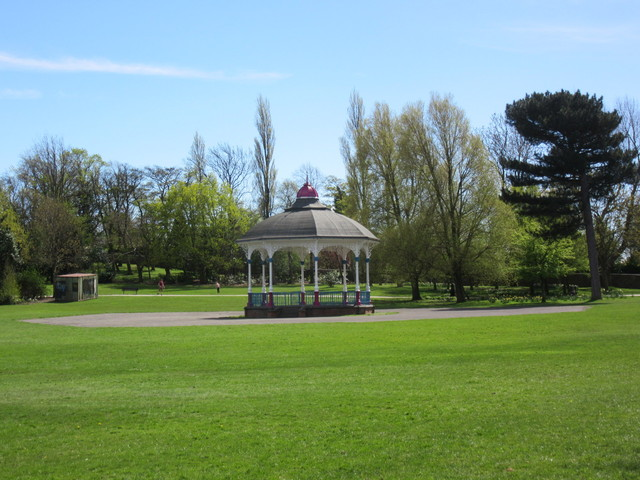
- Locke Park in Barnsley
- Interactive map of Locke Park
- Type: Municipal
- Location: Barnsley, South Yorkshire, England
- Created: 1861
- Open: All year

Locke Park is a 47-acre (19-hectare) public open space and one of the largest outdoor green spaces in the Metropolitan Borough of Barnsley, in South Yorkshire, England.

In 1861, Phoebe Locke, widow of railway pioneer Joseph Locke donated the park for the benefit of the people of Barnsley. Phoebe gave the original 17 acres (6.9 hectares), and the layout was undertaken by Locke's business partner, John Edward Errington. The park was extended in 1874, when Phoebe Locke's sister, Sarah McCreery donated a further 21 acres (8.5 hectares) in memory of her sister, who had died in 1866. There were further donations and additions of land to bring the park up to its current 47 acres (19 hectares).

The park is listed at Grade II on the Register of Historic Parks and Gardens of Special Historic Interest in England, being added in April 2001.

== Listed structures ==
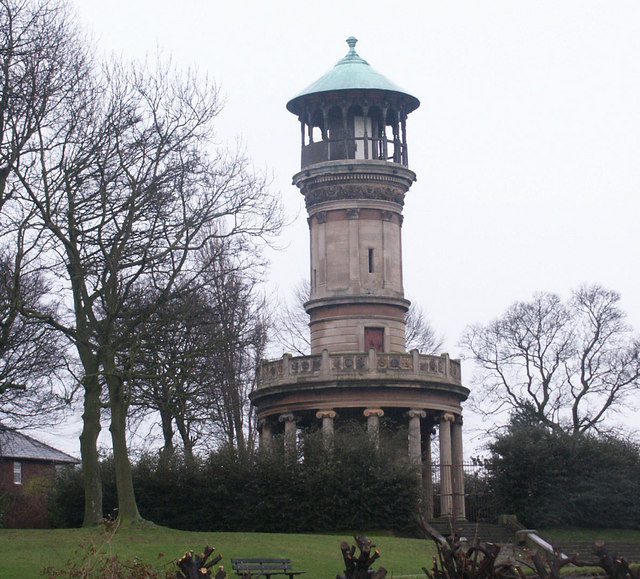
The Locke Park Tower

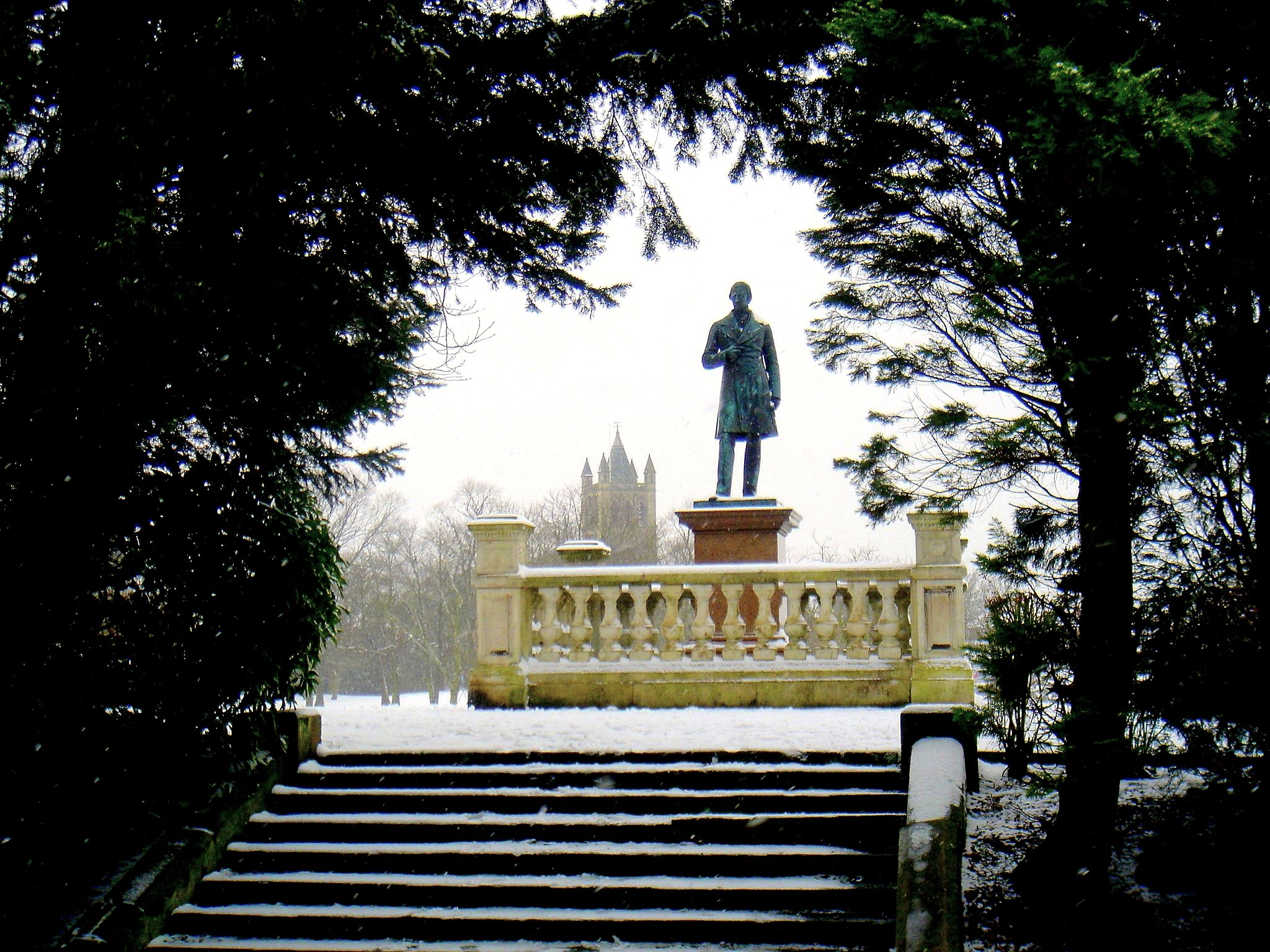
The Joseph Locke statue

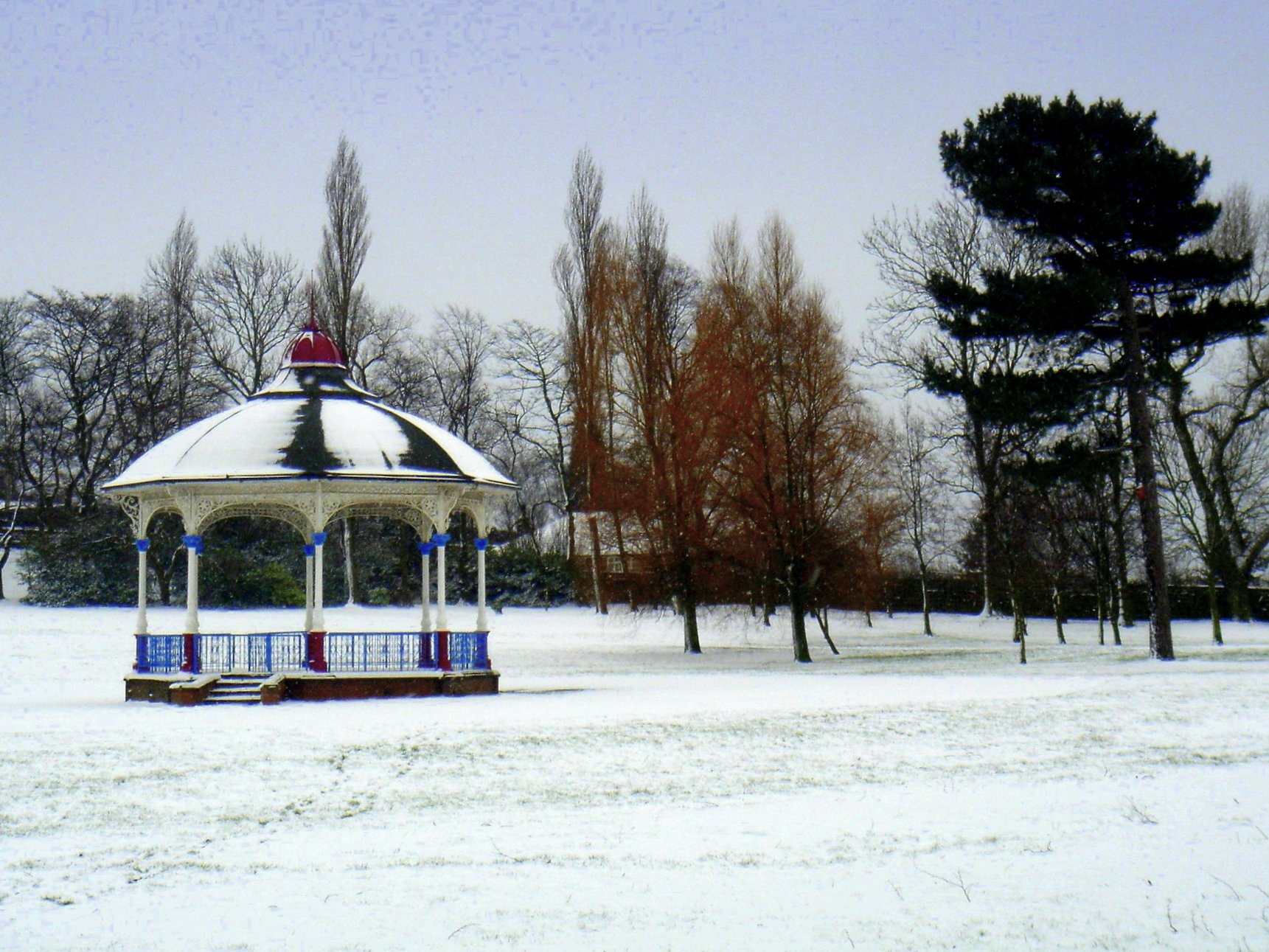
Bandstand

Sarah was also the instigator of Locke Park Tower, a 70 ft high monument built at the highest point of the park and designed by Richard Phené Spiers, a Paris-trained architect and Master of Architecture at the Royal Academy Schools, London. The Tower is a Grade II*listed building.

The park contains a larger than life bronze statue of Locke, which was erected in 1866. The statue by sculptor Carlo Marochetti is Grade II listed.

The final listed building within the park is the bandstand, which dates from 1908. The bandstand is constructed from eight cast-iron columns with a felt and lead roof. The structure is also Grade II listed.

== See also ==
- Listed buildings in Barnsley (Kingstone Ward)
