= Hands Off Gretel =

British alternative rock band (e. 2015)

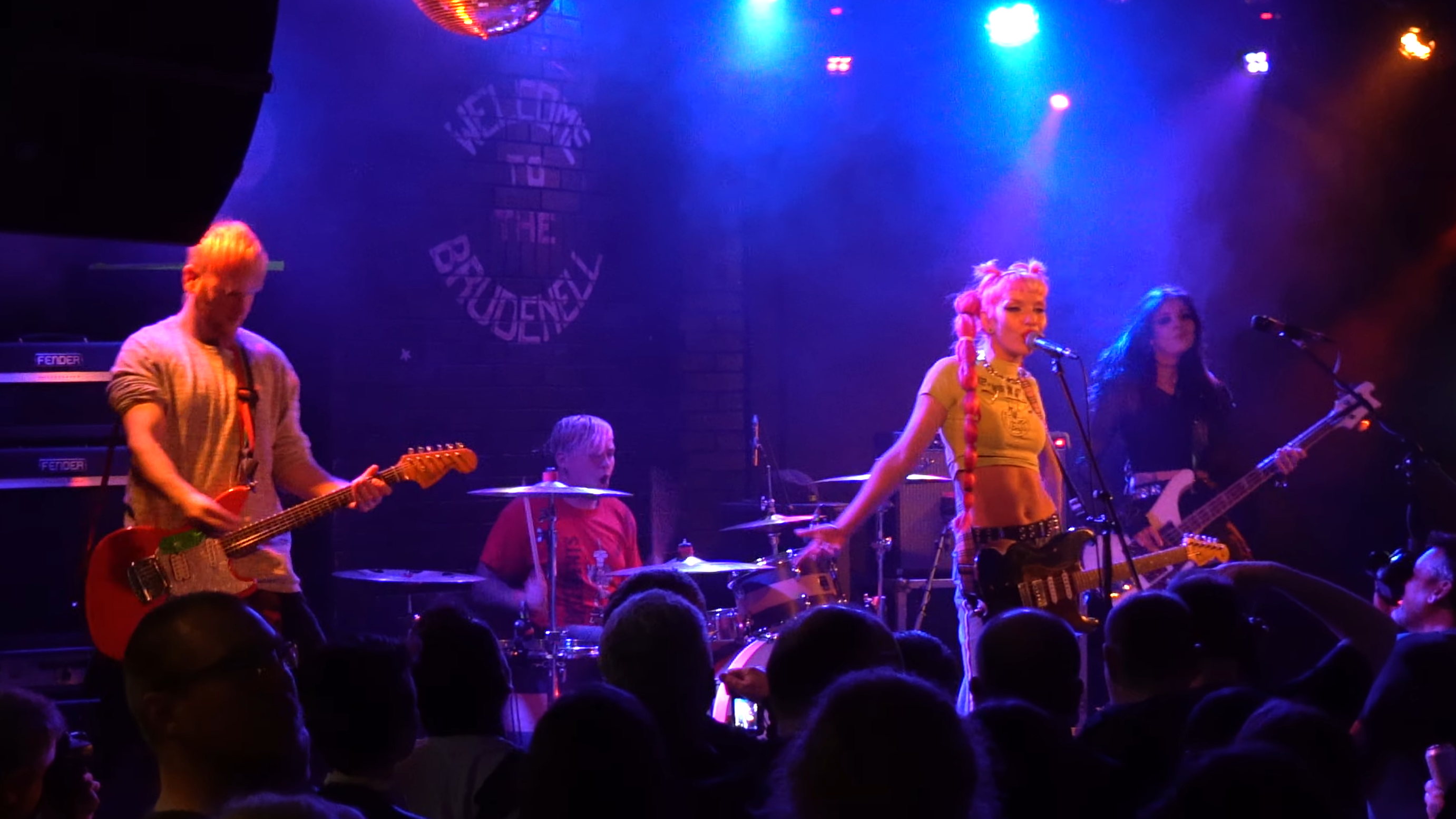
- Hands Off Gretel performing in 2020

Background information
- Origin: Barnsley, England
- Genres: Grunge, alternative rock, post-grunge
- Years active: 2015–2022
- Label: Hands Off Gretel
- Past members: Becky Baldwin; Danny Pollard; Joe Scotcher; Laura Moakes; Lauren Tate; Sam Hobbins; Sean Bon
- Website: www.handsoffgretel.co.uk

Hands Off Gretel were an English rock band, formed 2015 in Barnsley, South Yorkshire.

The last line-up was composed of frontwoman Lauren Tate, guitarist Sean Bon, drummer Sam Hobbins and bassist Becky Baldwin. The band self-released two studio albums, one demos album and several EPs before going on hiatus in 2022.

== History ==
The band was formed in 2015. A preview for a Southampton concert in the Basingstoke Gazette reported "Hands Off Gretel's frontwoman Lauren Tate has made it her mission to ensure that strong young women have a voice in today's music industry." Tate is also credited for the band's videos, album artwork, and designing of the band's merchandise.

In 2016, they released their debut album Burn the Beauty Queen, which received praise from Ged Babey in Louder Than War: "a massive achievement and over-ambitious album which marks the start of a career that could well see them becoming as big as Nirvana, Marilyn Manson or Miley Cyrus over time..... given the breaks, and skillful management."

Their performance at The Great British Alternative Festival at Butlins in Skegness was reviewed by Vive Le Rock. Reviewer Paula Frost commented on how Tate "entered with yet another iconic look, this time dressed in gold with lines drawn across her face [...] She knows how to get the audience snapping away."

A second album I Want the World was released on 29 March 2019. Vive Le Rock's Paula Frost awarded the album 8/10, commenting "It's not often you get a band who can emit intimidation and cuteness all at once." Later that year, Tate released a new solo album, Songs for Sad Girls.

Tate has also performed as a solo artist, both predating and since the band's formation and split and also performs R&B/Hip Hop under the alias Delilah Bon.

== Discography ==
=== Studio albums ===
- Burn the Beauty Queen (Hands Off Gretel, 2016)
- I Want the World (Puke Pop, 2019)

=== Demos Album ===
- "Bedroom Sessions'" (Hands Off Gretel, 2016)

=== Singles/ EPs ===
- "Be Mine" (Hands Off Gretel, 2015)
- "My Size" (Hands Off Gretel, 2016)
- "The Angry EP" (Puke Pop, 2020)

=== Compilations ===
- Devolution Issue 41 - Devolution magazine
