= Delilah Bon =

English singer (born 1997)

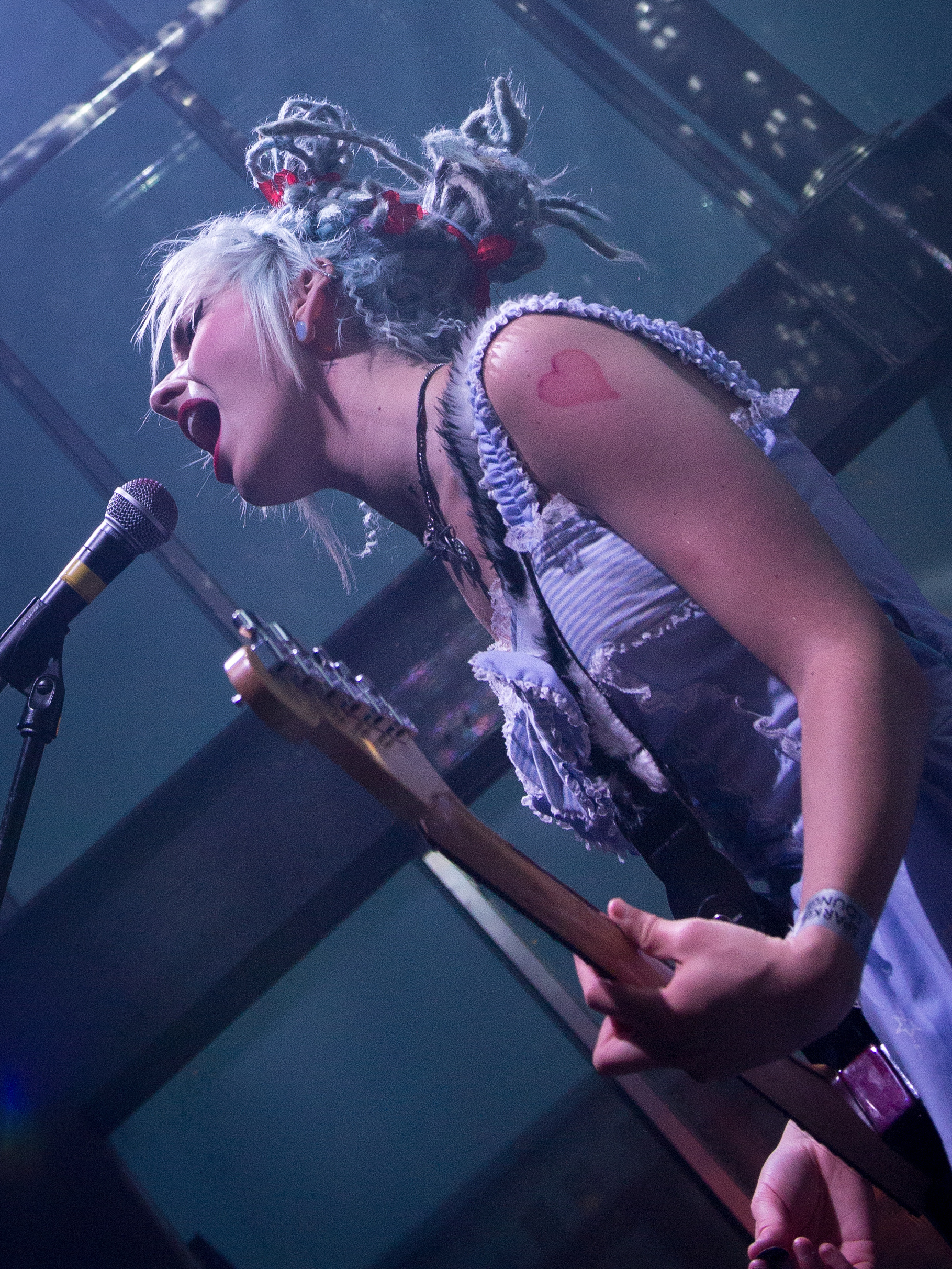
- Tate with Hands Off Gretel in 2015

Background information
- Born: Lauren Tate; 8 March 1997 (age 29); Barnsley, South Yorkshire, England
- Genres: Hip hop; grunge; alternative rock
- Occupations: Singer; songwriter; rapper; producer
- Instruments: Vocals; guitar
- Years active: 2013–present
- Label: Trash Queen Records
- Formerly of: Hands Off Gretel
- Website: www.delilahbon.co.uk

Lauren Tate (born 8 March 1997) is an English vocalist, songwriter and producer, formerly the frontwoman of Hands Off Gretel. She currently releases music under the pseudonym Delilah Bon.

== Career ==
She posted her first single "Devil" in July 2020, followed by several other tracks and later released her debut album Delilah Bon in May 2021. Her debut tour followed in autumn 2022.

Towards the end of 2023 Bon was invited to perform on France's music TV programm Taratata. She performed her song "War on Women", shared the stage with Shaka Ponk and gave an interview, in which she announced working on her second album.

== Musical style and lyrics ==
Bon's music spans over several genres including 2000s style hip-hop, melodic rap and nu-metal. She uses different styles in her performance, often alternating between screaming, rapping and singing.

== Awards and nominations ==
Delilah Bon was nominated for the Heavy Music Awards 2023 in the category Best UK Breakthrough Artist. She competed with Cody Frost, Lake Malice, Kid Bookie, As December Falls, Blackgold and ZAND. As December Falls would win this category.

== Discography ==
For Delilah Bon's discography as a member of Hands Off Gretel, see Hands Off Gretel discography.

=== Studio albums ===
Title	Details
Songs for Sad Girls (as Lauren Tate)	Released: 20 September 2019; Label: Ditto Music; Format: Digital download, streaming
Delilah Bon	Released: 21 May 2021; Label: Trash Queen Records; Format: LP, Digital download, streaming
Evil, Hate Filled Female	Released: 13 September 2024; Label: Trash Queen; Format: Digital download, streaming

=== Extended plays ===
Title	Details
Ready to Kill	Released: 15 October 2021; Label: Trash Queen Records; Format: Digital download, streaming
Princeless Princess	Released: 26 September 2025; Label: Trash Queen Records; Format: Digital download, streaming

=== Singles ===
Title	Year	Album
"Miss American Perfect Body"	2019	Songs for Sad Girls
"What About the Kids"	2019	Songs for Sad Girls
"Devil"	2020	Delilah Bon
"Bad Attitude"	2020	Delilah Bon
"Homework"	2020	Delilah Bon
"Chop Dicks"	2020	Delilah Bon
"Chun-Li"	2020	Non-album single
"Where My Girls At?"	2020	Delilah Bon
"Godzilla"	2020	Non-album single
"School"	2020	Delilah Bon
"I Don't Listen to You"	2021	Non-album singles
"My Family"	2021	Non-album singles
"Dead Men Don't Rape"	2022	Non-album singles
"I Wish a Bitch Would"	2023	Non-album singles
"Brat"	2023	Non-album singles
"Witch" (with Alt Blk Era)	2023	Non-album singles
"Maverick"	2024	Evil, Hate Filled Female
"Finally See Me"	2024	Evil, Hate Filled Female
"Evil, Hate Filled Female"	2024	Evil, Hate Filled Female
"The Internet"	2024	Evil, Hate Filled Female
"Volatile"	2024	Evil, Hate Filled Female
"Not the President"	2024	Non-album single
"Princeless Princess"	2025	Princeless Princess
"Illegal Aliens"	2026	TBA
"Time's Up"	2026	TBA
