= Kingstone, South Yorkshire =

Area of Barnsley in South Yorkshire, England

Coordinates: 53.544°N 1.496°W

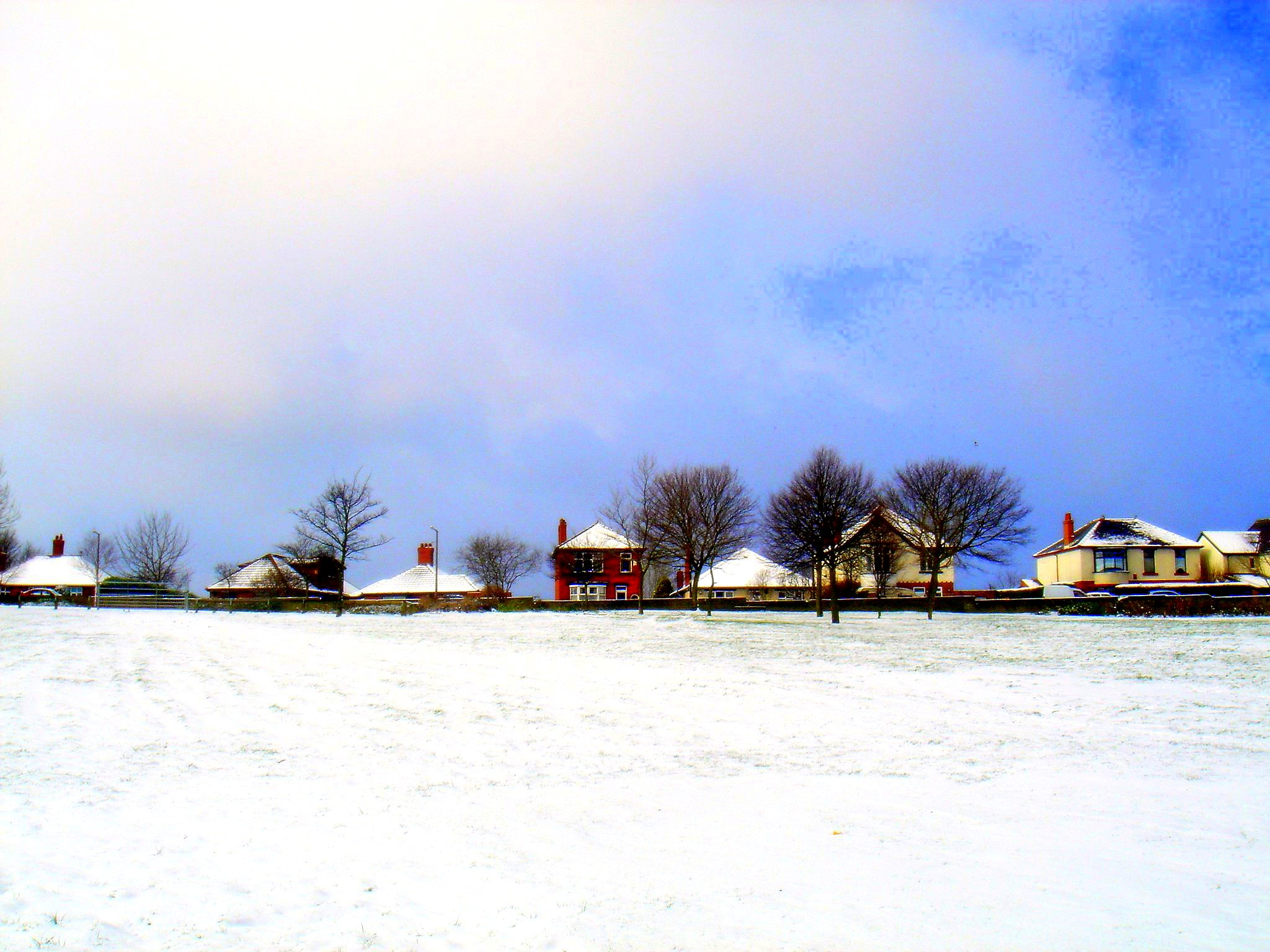
Kingstone in winter

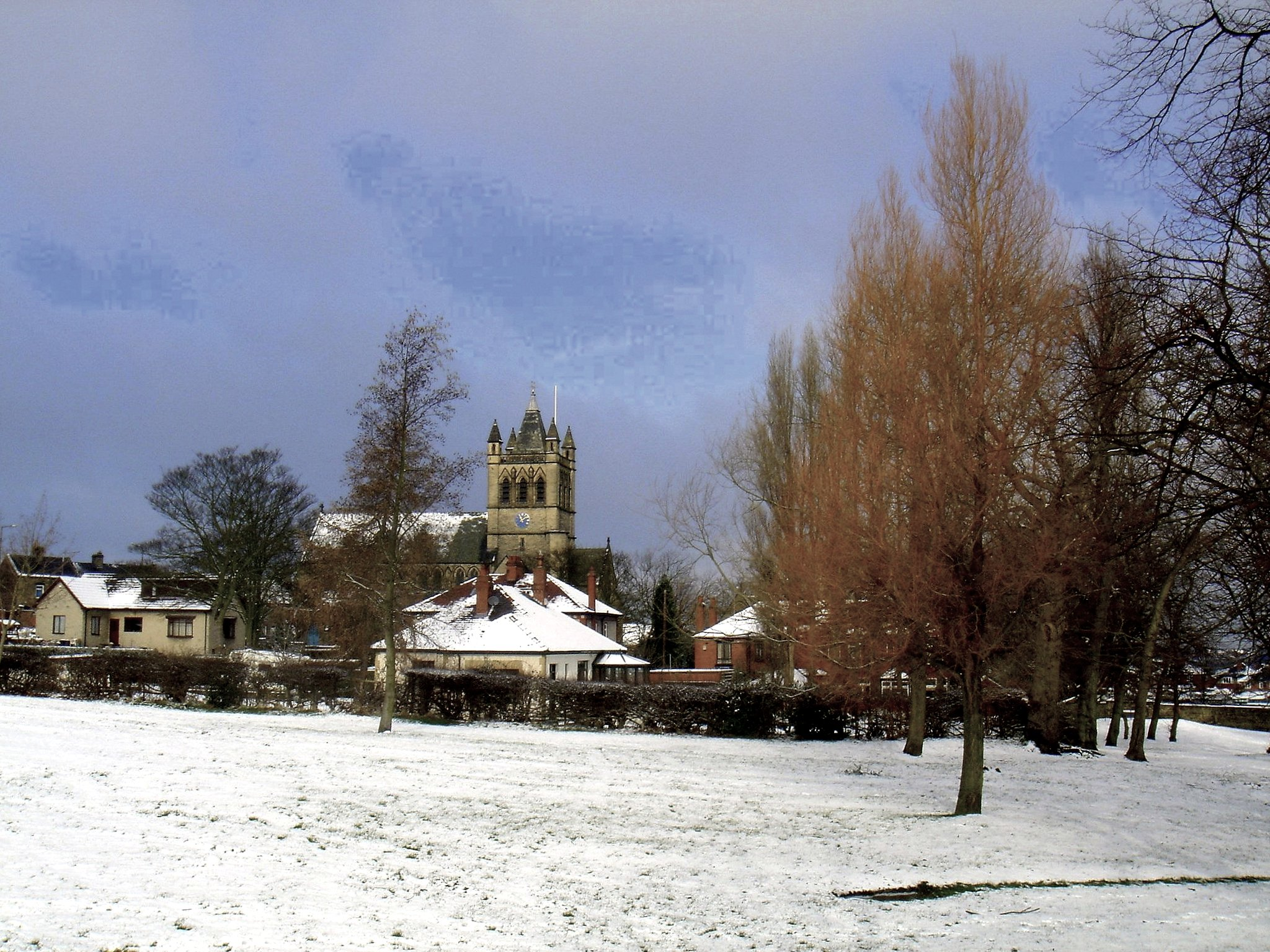
Church of St Edward the Confessor

Kingstone is a small residential neighbourhood in Barnsley, located on the south-western side of Barnsley between Broadway and Park Road. Barnsley Central fire station and the recently demolished The Kingstone School are both located in the Kingstone area. The local St Edward the Confessor's church, built between 1900 and 1902 in the Gothic revival style, is a Grade II listed building.

== See also ==
- Listed buildings in Barnsley (Kingstone Ward)
