= Barnsley Chronicle =

- Founded: 1858
- Language: English
- City: Barnsley
- Country: UK
- Website: www.barnsley-chronicle.co.uk

The Barnsley Chronicle, published in Barnsley, South Yorkshire, is one of the UK's oldest provincial newspapers and one of the few weeklies still in private ownership. It was launched in 1858 and celebrated its 150th anniversary in 2008. It is owned and operated by the Hewitt family and is part of the wider Acredula Group. The paper also covers local news for the Barnsley audience and also publishes "We Are Barnsley" and the "Holme Valley Review".

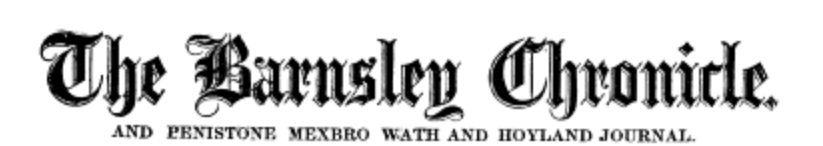
Masthead of the Barnsley Chronicle, 1914, incorporating Penistone, Mexborough (Mexbro), Wath and Hoyland Journal

It incorporates the Penistone, Mexborough, Wath and Hoyland Journal.

== See also ==
- Pen and Sword Books, a subsidiary
