= Barnsley =

Town in South Yorkshire, England

Coordinates: 53°33′10″N 1°28′50″W

- Town
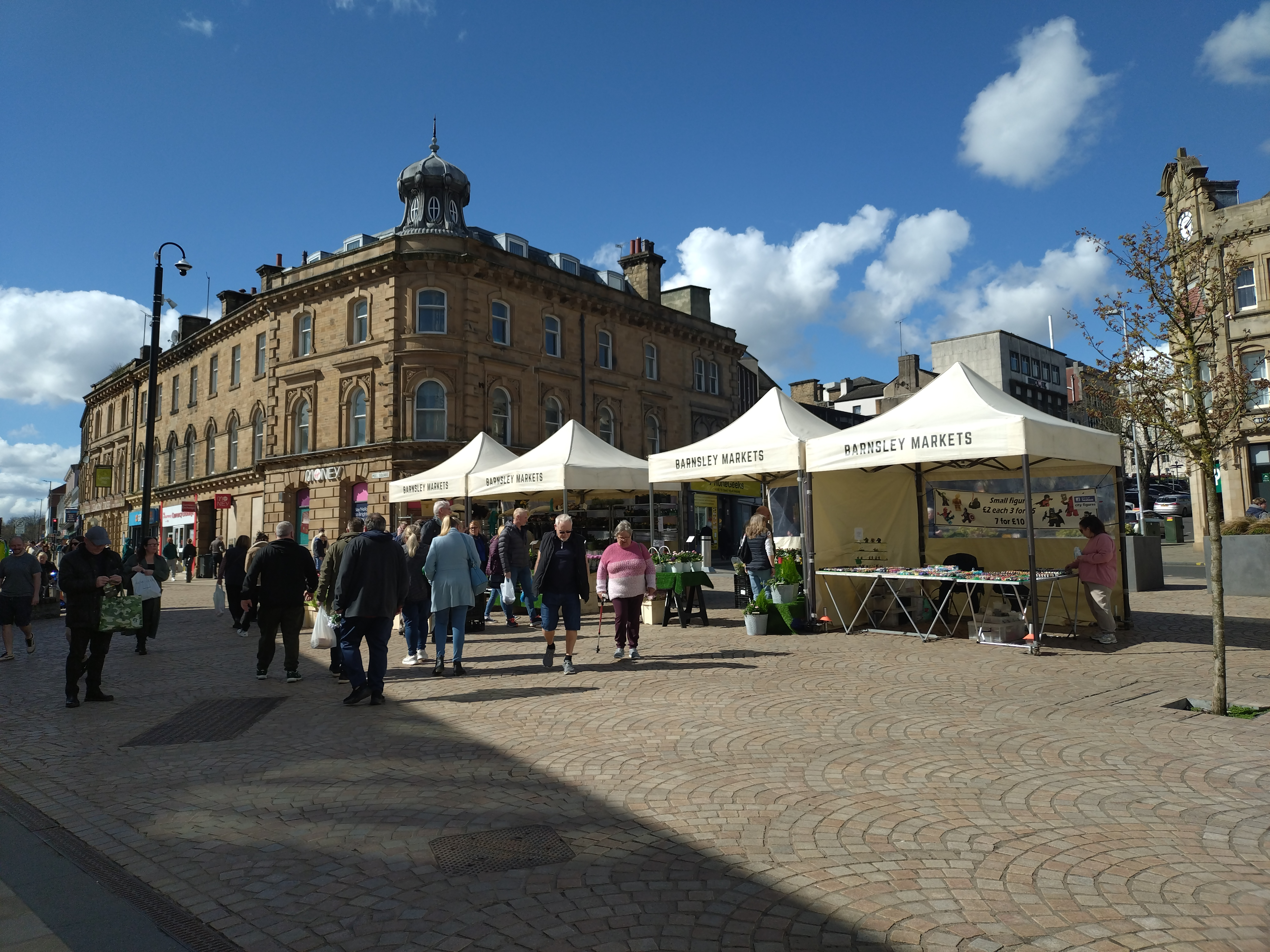
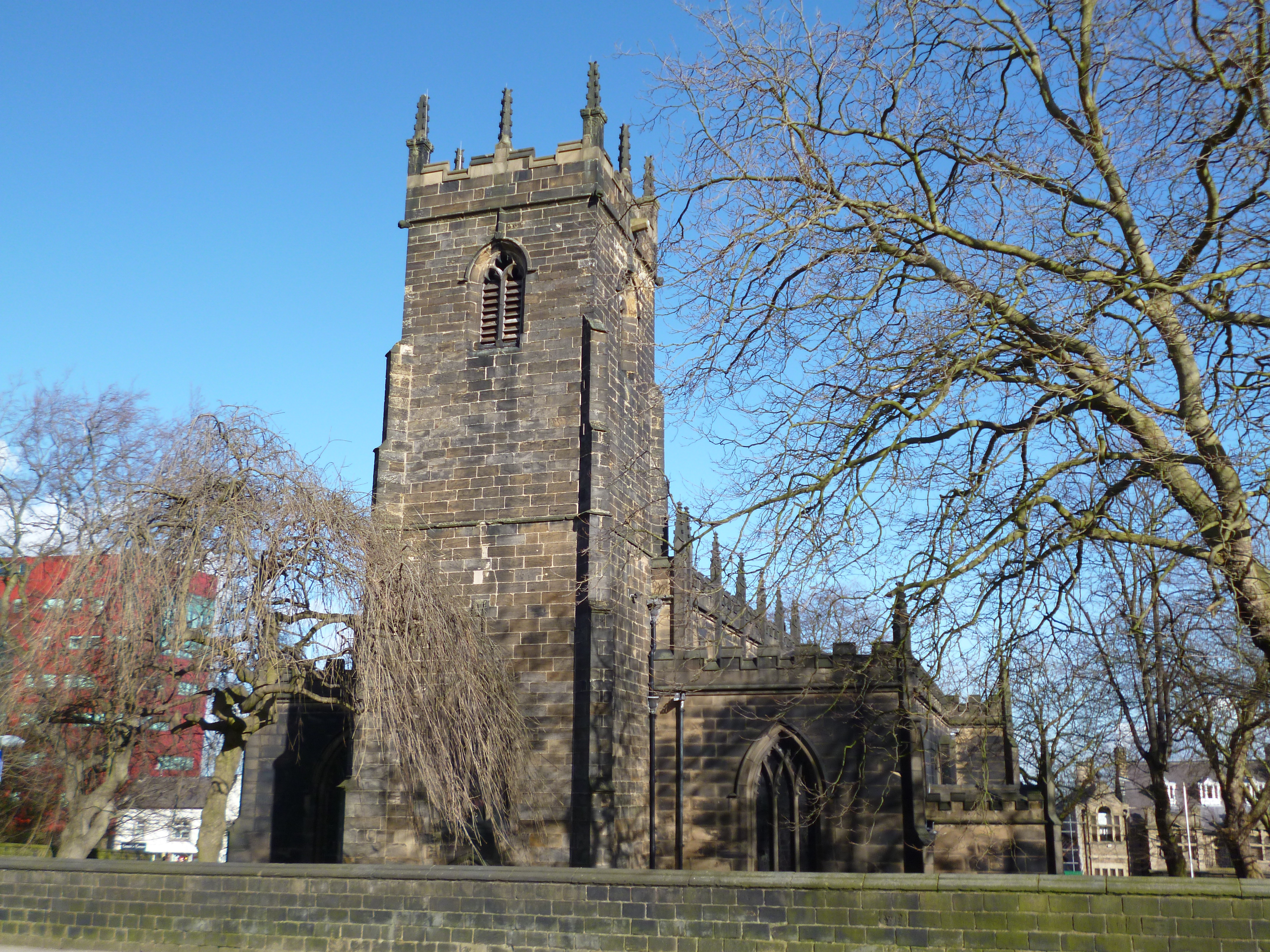
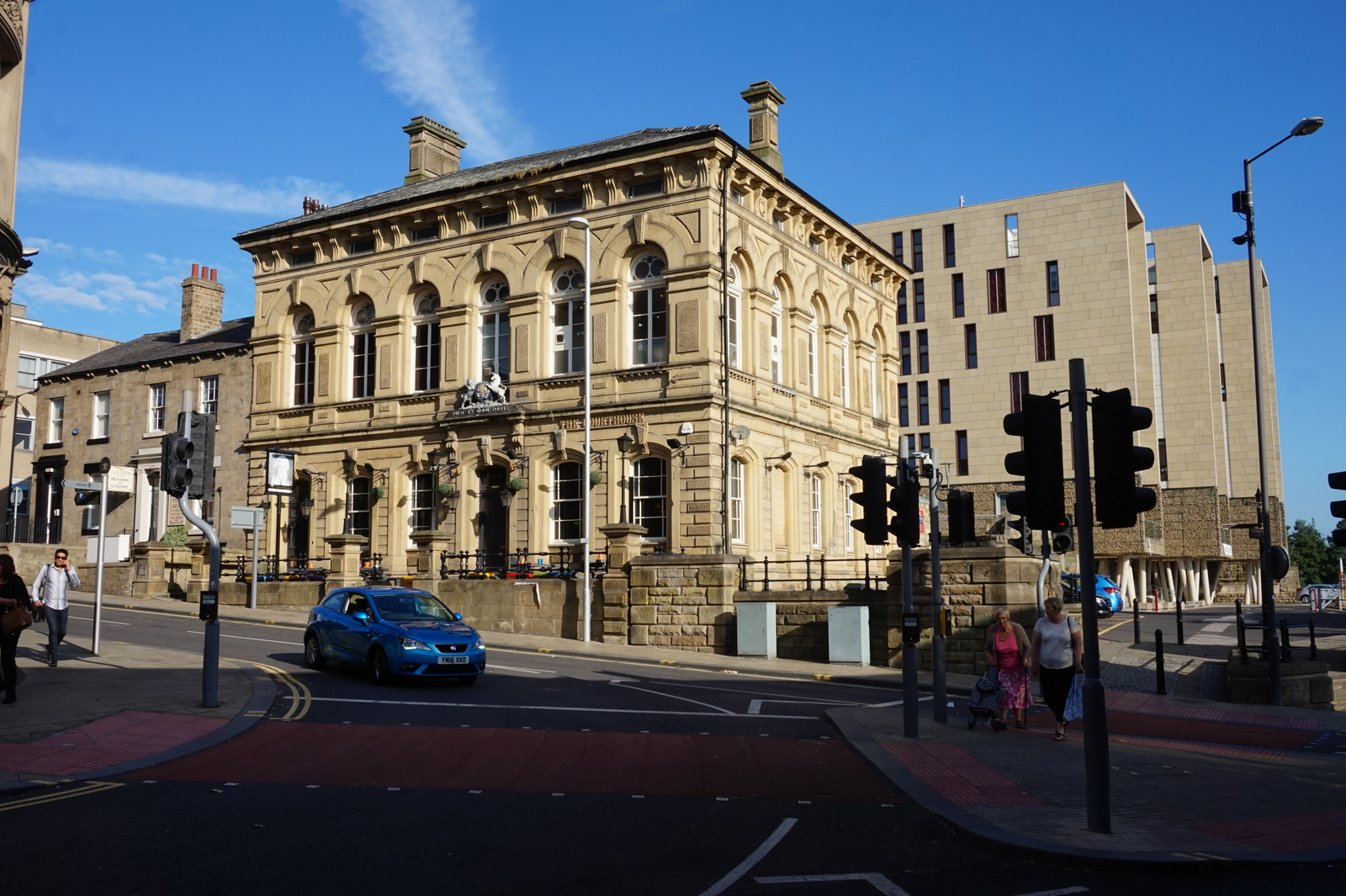
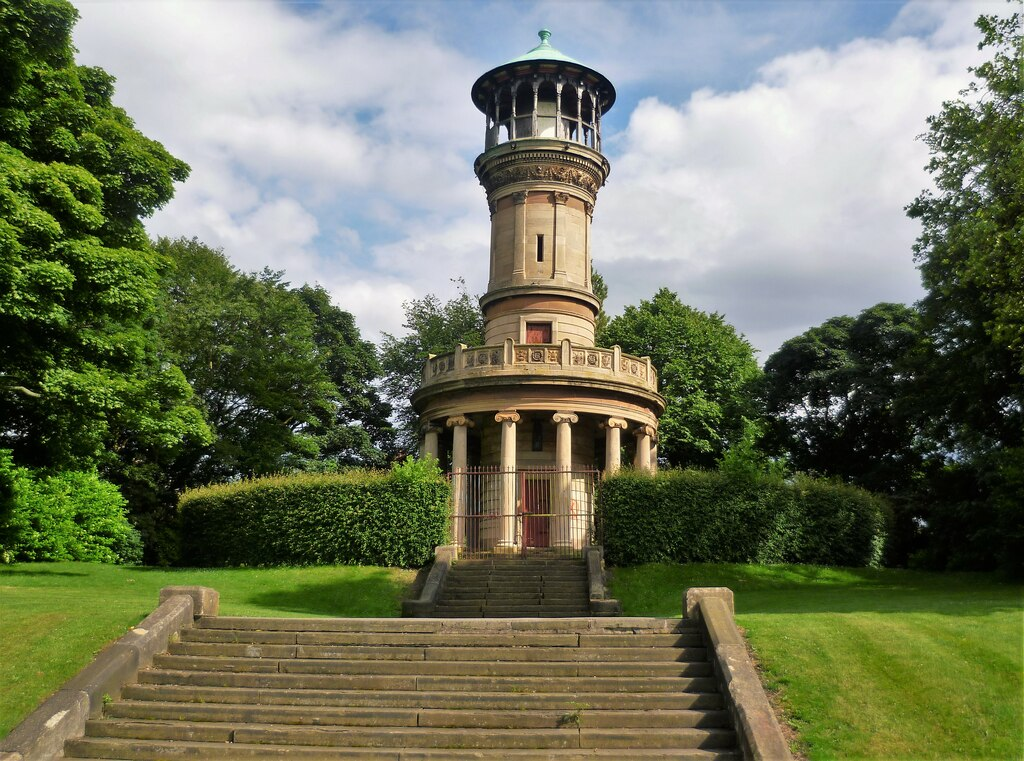
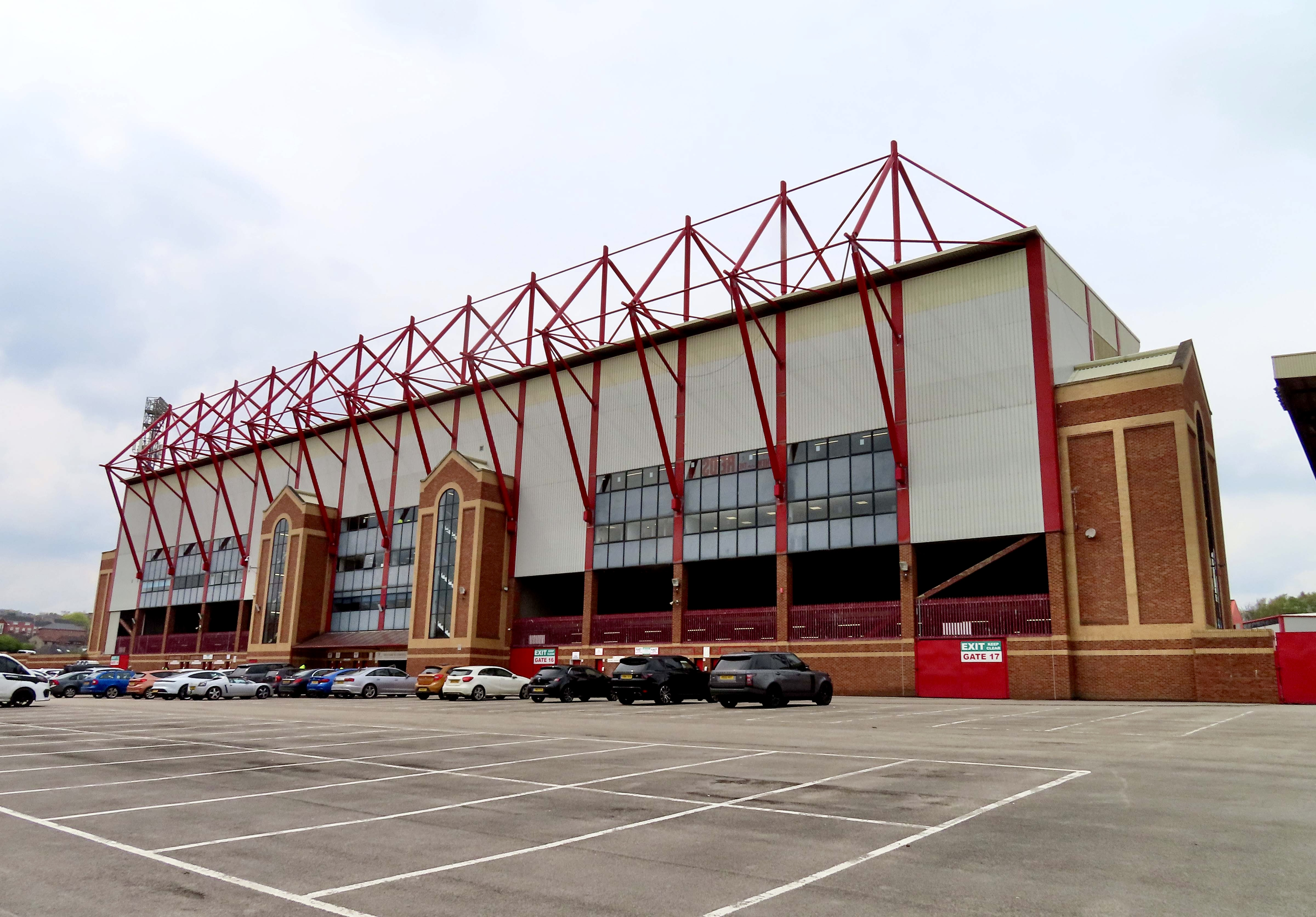
- The town centre St Mary's Church Old Courthouse Lock Park Tower Oakwell

- Location within South Yorkshire
- Population: 71,422 (2021 Census)
- OS grid reference: SE3406
  - London: 175 miles (282 km) SSE
- Metropolitan borough: Metropolitan Borough of Barnsley
- Metropolitan county: South Yorkshire
- Region: Yorkshire and the Humber
- Country: England
- Sovereign state: United Kingdom
- Areas of the town: List: Athersley; Carlton; Kendray; Kingstone; Lundwood; Monk Bretton; Pogmoor; Stairfoot
- Post town: BARNSLEY
- Postcode district: S70, S71, S75
- Dialling code: 01226
- Police: South Yorkshire
- Fire: South Yorkshire
- Ambulance: Yorkshire
- UK Parliament: Barnsley North, Barnsley South, Penistone and Stocksbridge
- Website: https://www.barnsley.gov.uk/

Barnsley (/ˈbɑːrnzli/) is a market town in South Yorkshire, England. It is the main settlement of the Metropolitan Borough of Barnsley and the fourth largest settlement in South Yorkshire. The town's population was recorded as 71,599 at the 2021 census, while the wider borough (as of 2025) has a population of 251,770.

Historically in the West Riding of Yorkshire, Barnsley is located on the M1 corridor between the cities of Leeds and Wakefield to the north and Sheffield to the south. Doncaster lies to the east, Huddersfield to the north-west and Manchester lies west across the Peak District, to which it is connected via the A628 road.

Barnsley's former industries include linen, coal mining, glass making and textiles. Its culture is rooted in its industrial heritage and has a tradition of brass bands, originally created as social clubs by its mining communities.

== History ==
The name Barnsley derives from the Old English Beornslēah meaning 'Beorn's wood or clearing'.

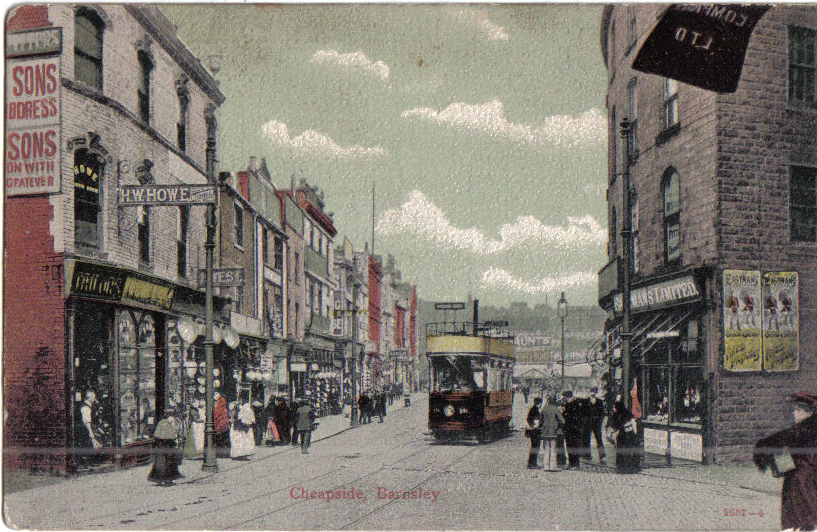
Cheapside, by Hartmann c. 1904

Following the Norman invasion of 1066, many abbeys and priories were built in Yorkshire. Norman landowners increased their revenues and established new towns such as Barnsley, Doncaster, Hull, Leeds, Scarborough and Sheffield. Of towns founded before the conquest, only Bridlington, Pocklington, and York continued at a prominent level.

Although settlements had been established in the Barnsley area for centuries prior, and was a well known centre to trade, the first reference to Barnsley occurs in 1086 in the Domesday Book, in which it is called Berneslai and has a population of around 200.

The town was in the parish of Silkstone and developed little until in the 1150s, when it was given to the Pontefract Priory. The monks built a town where three roads met: the Sheffield to Wakefield, Rotherham to Huddersfield and Cheshire to Doncaster routes. The Domesday village became known as Old Barnsley, and a town grew up on the new site.

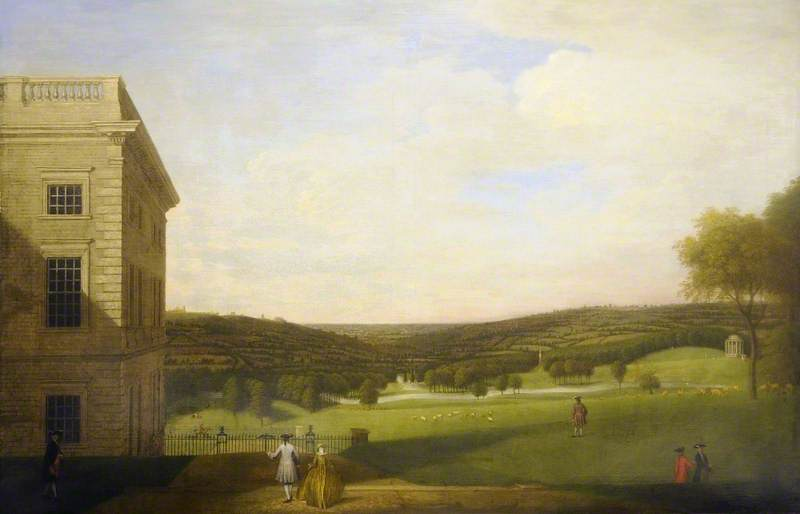
Wentworth Castle by Thomas Bardwell 1751-1752

The monks erected a chapel of ease dedicated to Saint Mary, which survived until 1820, and established a market. In 1249, a Royal charter was granted to Barnsley permitting it to hold a weekly market on Wednesdays and annual four-day fair at Michaelmas. By the 1290s, three annual fairs were held. The town was the centre of the Staincross wapentake but, in the mid-16th century, it had only 600 inhabitants.

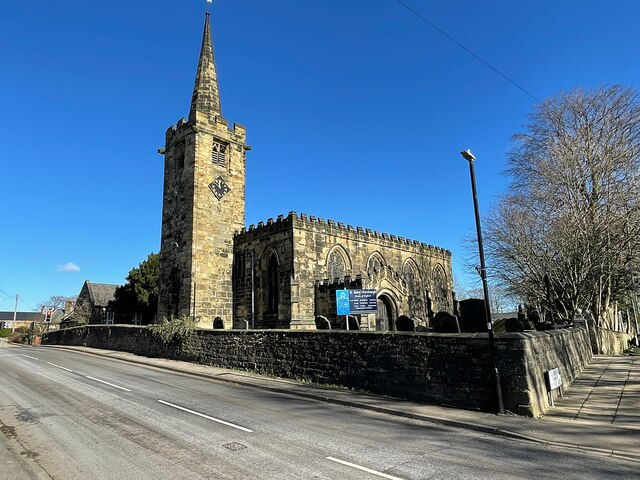
The current St Mary's Church

From the 17th century, Barnsley developed into a stop-off point on the route between Leeds, Wakefield, Sheffield and London. The traffic generated as a result of its location fuelled trade, with hostelries and related services prospering. A principal centre for linen-weaving during the 18th and 19th century, Barnsley grew into an important manufacturing town.

The first passenger station to serve Barnsley was opened by the North Midland Railway in 1840. Barnsley station (later called Cudworth) was located some 2 1/2 miles (4 km) away at Cudworth. On 1 January 1850, the Manchester and Leeds Railway opened Barnsley Exchange station, close to the town centre. On 1 May 1870, the Midland Railway opened Regent Street station, a temporary structure. A new station was opened by the MR on the Regent Street site on 23 August 1873. As it incorporated the old court house in its construction, Regent Street station was renamed Barnsley Court House.

Barnsley became a municipal borough in 1869 and a county borough in 1913. The town's boundaries were extended to absorb Ardsley and Monk Bretton in 1921, and Carlton in 1938.

The town was the site of a human crush that resulted in the deaths of 16 children in 1908 at a public hall, now known as The Civic, when children were rushing to watch a film in the building.

Barnsley has a long tradition of glass-making, however Barnsley is most famous for its coal mines. In 1960, there were 70 collieries within a 15 miles (24 km) radius of Barnsley town centre, but the last of these closed in 1994. The National Union of Mineworkers still has its HQ in Barnsley.

George Orwell mentioned the town in The Road to Wigan Pier. He arrived in the town on 11 March 1936 and spent a number of days living in the houses of the working class miners, while researching for the book. He wrote very critically of the council's expenditure on the construction of Barnsley Town Hall and claimed that the money should have been spent on improving the housing and living conditions of the local miners.

== Governance ==
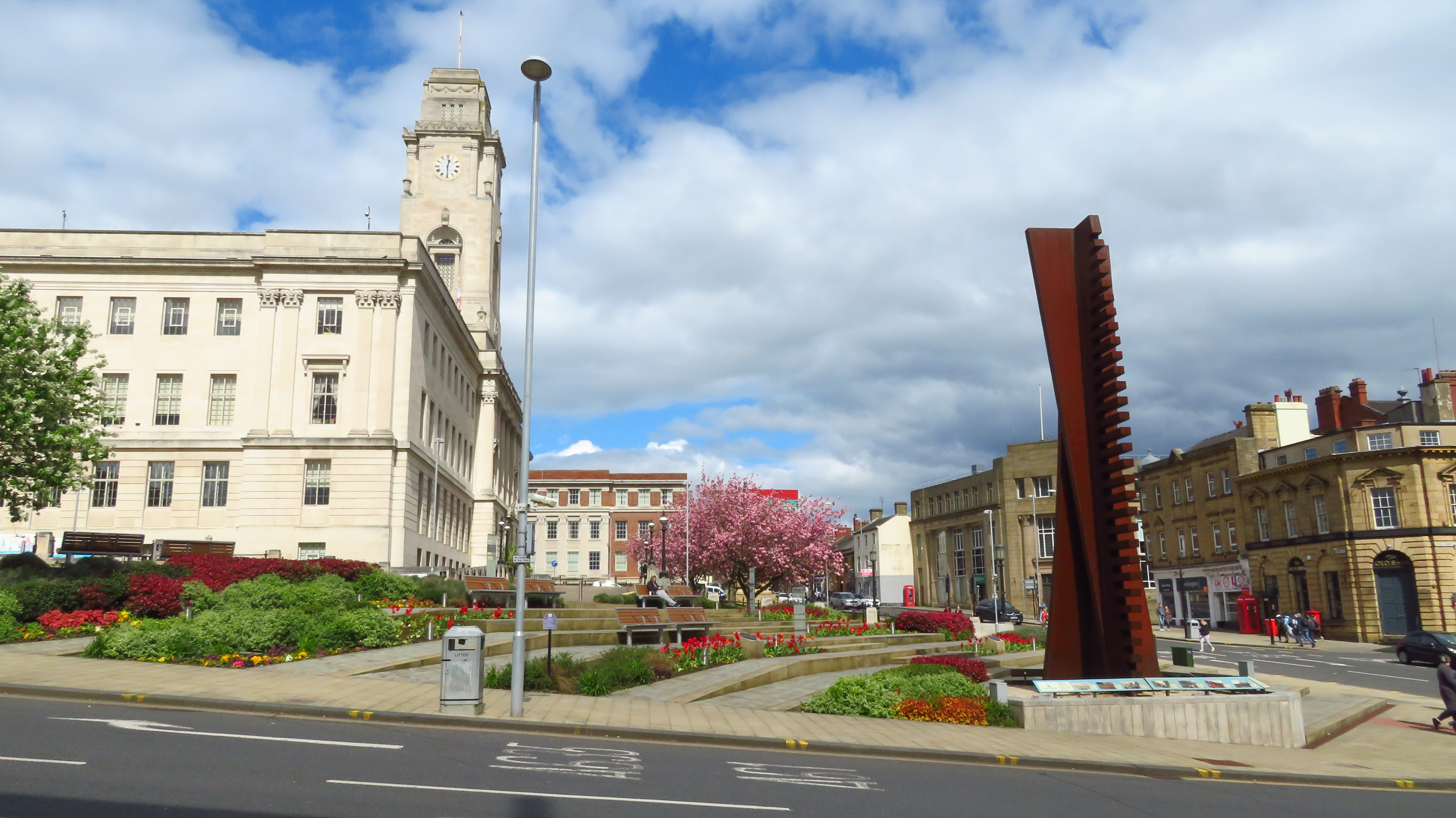
Barnsley Town Hall

The town hall itself is visible behind some gardens; the building is made of white stone and has an impressive clock tower. Opened on 14 December 1933, Barnsley Town Hall is the seat of local government in the Metropolitan Borough of Barnsley. The County Borough of Barnsley was created in 1913, administered independently of the West Riding of Yorkshire. In 1974, following the Local Government Act 1972, the county borough was abolished and Barnsley became part of the Metropolitan Borough of Barnsley in the new county of South Yorkshire, along with nine urban districts and parts of two rural districts of the surrounding area, including many towns and villages including Penistone and Cudworth.

Elections to Barnsley Metropolitan Borough Council have seen the Labour Party retain control of the council at every election until 2026, when Reform UK won a majority of the seats. Following the latest election in 2026 the council has 42 Reform, 11 Labour, and 8 Liberal Democrat, and 2 Independent councillors. The borough council elects the mayor every year. On the day of the election, a parade takes place in front of the town hall in honour of the new mayor.

The metropolitan borough is split into four parliamentary constituencies, all represented by the following Labour Party MPs: Barnsley North by Dan Jarvis, Barnsley South by Stephanie Peacock, Penistone and Stocksbridge by Marie Tidball, and Wentworth and Dearne, by John Healey.

== Geography ==
Barnsley is located in the valley of the River Dearne at the eastern foothills of the Pennines, near the uplands of the Peak District to the west. Geologically, the town is located within the area of the South Yorkshire Coalfield, consisting of the middle coal measures and sandstones laid down in the Carboniferous period. The town lies approximately 12 miles (19 km) north of Sheffield, 17 miles (27 km) south of Leeds, 9 miles (14 km) south of Wakefield and 32 miles (51 km) east of Manchester.

=== Divisions and suburbs ===
Ardsley, Athersley, Barugh Green, Bank End, Birdwell, Darton, Carlton, Cawthorne, Cudworth, Cundy Cross, Darfield, Dodworth, Elsecar, Gawber, Grimethorpe, Higham, Honeywell, Hoyland, High Hoyland, Hoylandswaine, Kendray, Kexbrough, Kingstone, Langsett Lundwood, Mapplewell, Monk Bretton, Tankersley, New Lodge, Oakwell, Old Town, Penistone, Pogmoor, Royston, Shafton, Smithies, Silkstone, Staincross, Stairfoot, Thurnscoe, Wilthorpe, Woolley Colliery, Worsbrough (includes Worsbrough Bridge, Rockley, Worsbrough Dale, Swaithe, Worsbrough Village, and Ward Green), Worsbro Common, Wombwell and Wortley.

=== Green belt ===
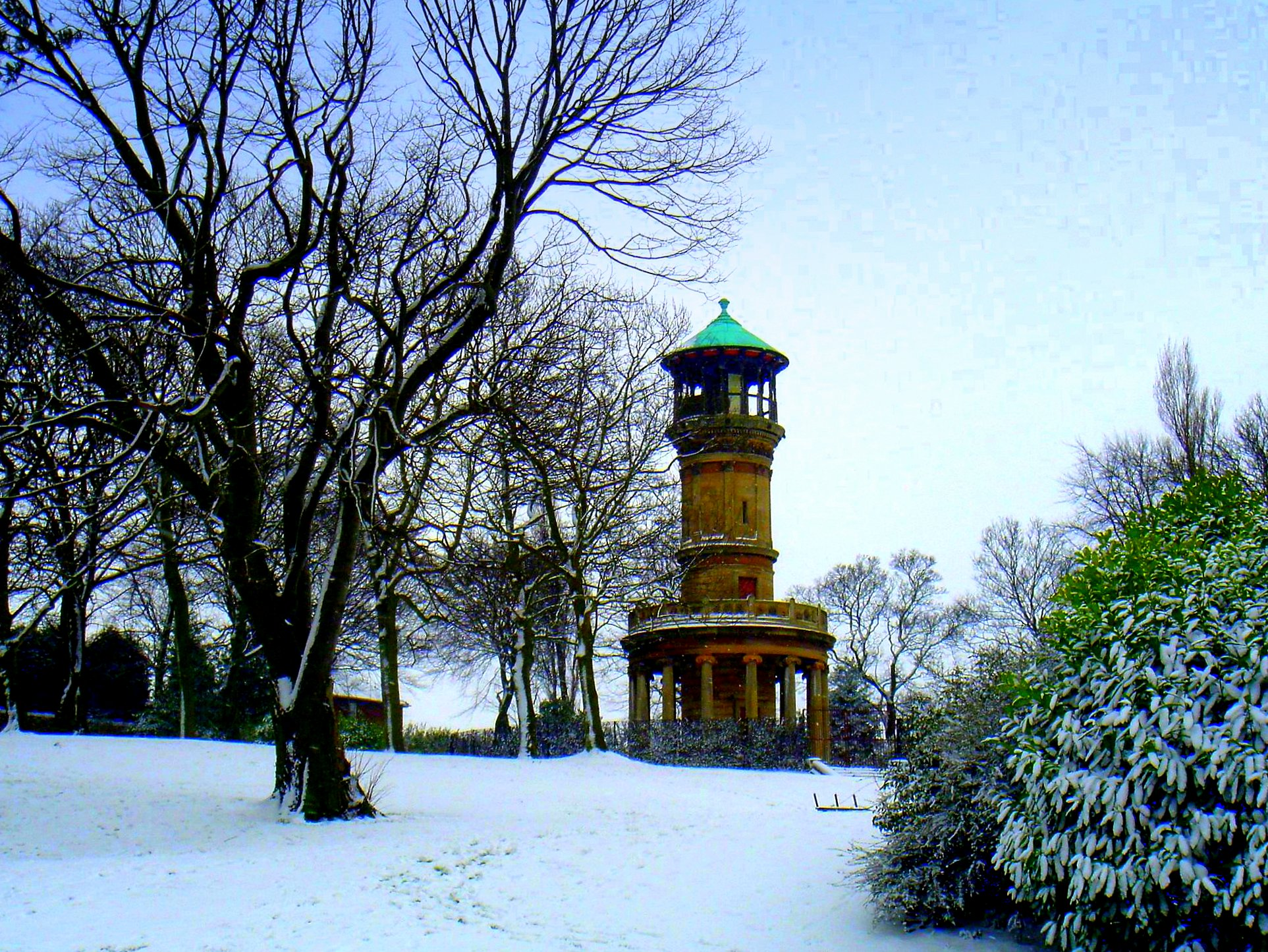
Locke Park

Barnsley is within a green belt region that extends into the borough and wider surrounding counties. It is in place to reduce urban sprawl, prevent the towns in the Barnsley/Dearne Valley conurbation from further convergence, protect the identity of outlying communities, encourage brownfield reuse and preserve nearby countryside. This is achieved by restricting inappropriate development within the designated areas, and imposing stricter conditions on permitted building.

The green belt surrounds the Barnsley built-up area, separating towns and villages throughout the borough. Larger outlying communities such as Cudworth, Dodworth, Kendray, Monk Bretton and Worsbrough are also exempt from the green belt area. However, nearby smaller villages, hamlets and rural areas such as Swaithe, Smithley, Low Laithes and Upper Norcroft are 'washed over' by the designation. Much semi-rural land on the fringes is also included. The green belt was first defined in 1979, and the area in 2017 amounted to some 23,050 hectares (230.5 km^{2}; 89.0 sq mi), 77% of the borough.

A subsidiary aim of the green belt is to encourage recreation and leisure interests, with rural landscape features, greenfield areas and facilities. These include the River Dearne valley, and its tributaries Cawthorne Dyke and Tanyard Beck; Hugset and Dovecliffe Woods; Worsbrough Mill Park and reservoir; Dearne Valley Park; Trans Pennine Trail; Kendray recreation ground; Locke Park; Stainborough Cricket Club and Park; Wentworth Castle and gardens; Barnsley Colliery; Monk Bretton Priory; Laithes Lane playing fields; and Barnsley Golf Club. Beyond Penistone, the green belt also borders the Peak District National Park.

== Demography ==
The town's population was recorded as 71,599 at the 2021 census, while the wider borough (as of 2025) has a population of 251,770.

=== Ethnic groups ===
According to the 2021 census, Barnsley was 95.5% White, 1.4% Asian, 1.1% Mixed, 1.0% Black and 1.0% other. Previously, 2011 census data showed the town was 94.7% White British, 1.1% Asian and 0.8% Black.

== Economy ==
=== Town centre ===
A large part of Barnsley town centre was constructed during the 1960s. The area around Cheapside and May Day Green, the Metropolitan Centre, is home to the market and many national high street chains. Alhambra Shopping Centre, which was opened in 1991, houses several retailers.

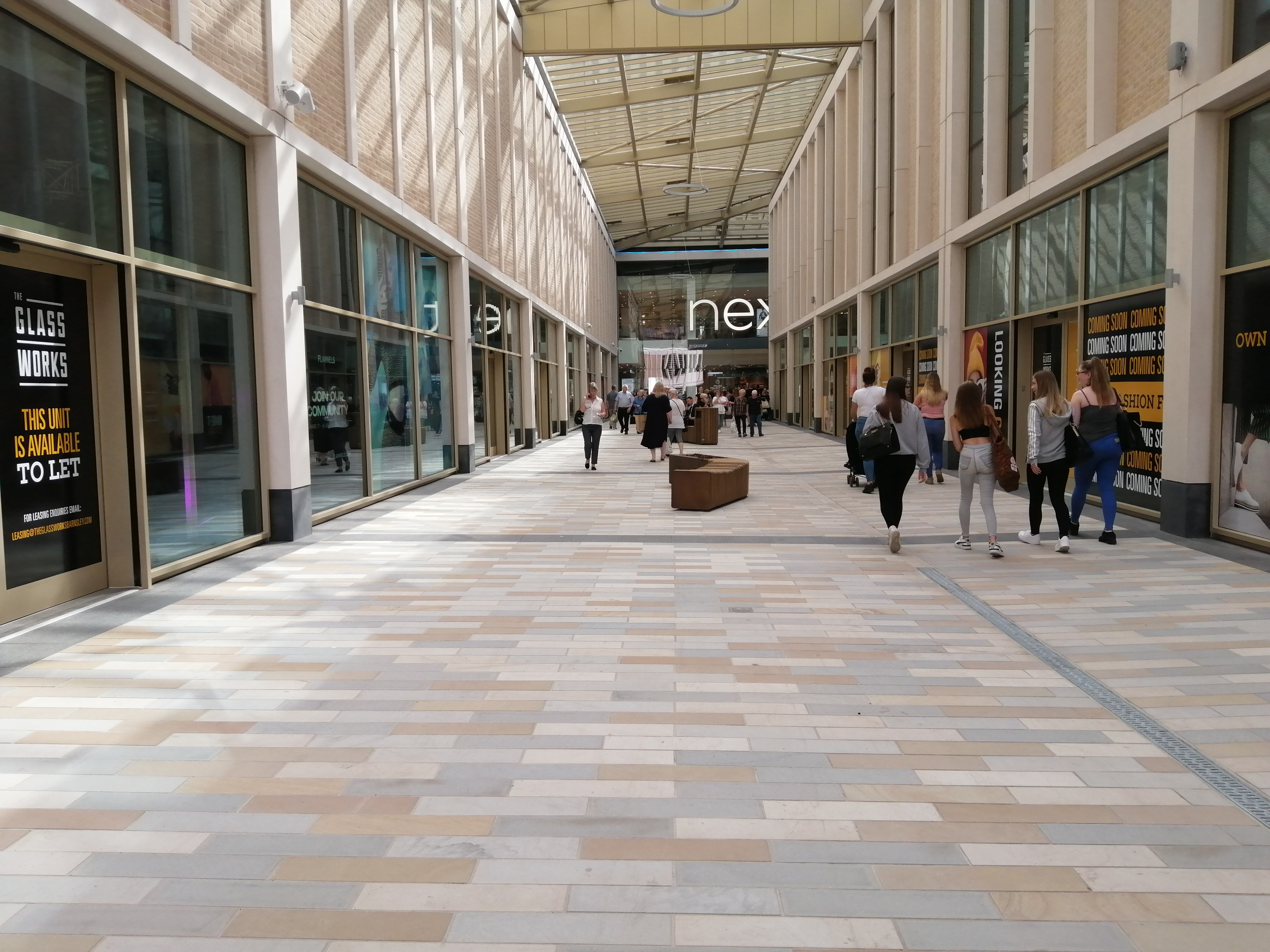
The Glassworks centre interior

Other prominent areas include Queen Street, Market Street, Eldon Street and the Victorian Arcade, which houses the majority of the independent and designer retailers in Barnsley. The town also has a large concentration of pubs and bars in the central district. There is also a twin auditorium cinema called Parkway Cinema Barnsley occupying what once was the Odeon Cinema on Eldon Street.

The development of a new shopping centre was started in the town centre in late 2015.

=== Regeneration ===
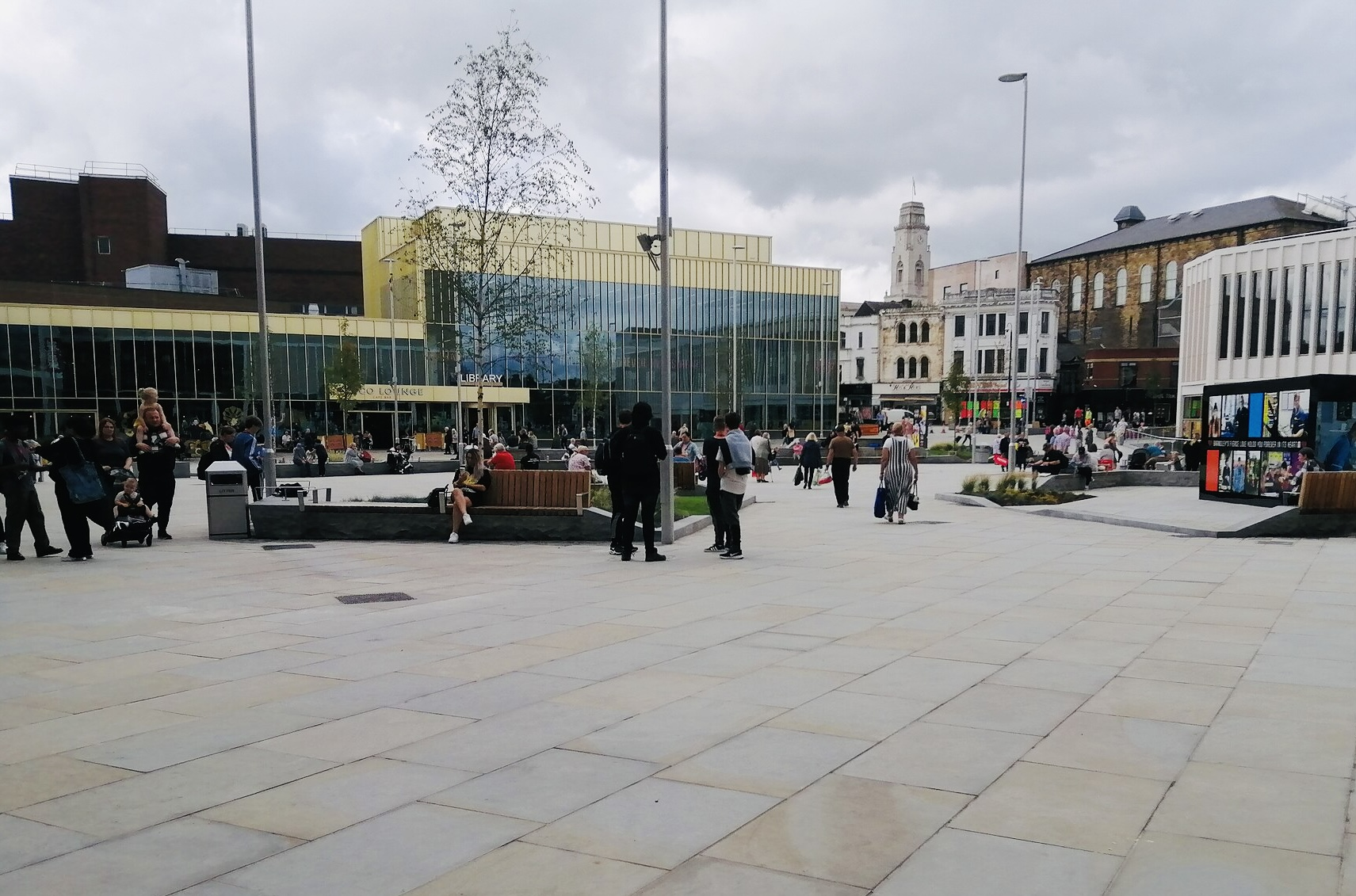
Glassworks Square

Barnsley town centre has been undergoing a period of change; projects include:

- The new Barnsley Interchange (completed in 2007)
- The Digital Media Centre (now completed)
- Gateway Plaza at Town End (now completed)
- Experience Barnsley – The creation of the Barnsley People's Museum and Archives Centre. This project was awarded almost £3m of funding from the Heritage Lottery Fund, which means two floors of Barnsley's town hall were transformed into museum galleries (now completed)
- Barnsley College A Block was completed and opened in September 2011.
- A new area of town opened in 2021, the Glass Works. It re-houses the town's historic market, and adds a food court, a 13-screen Cineworld cinema, bowling alley and high street shops. (now completed)

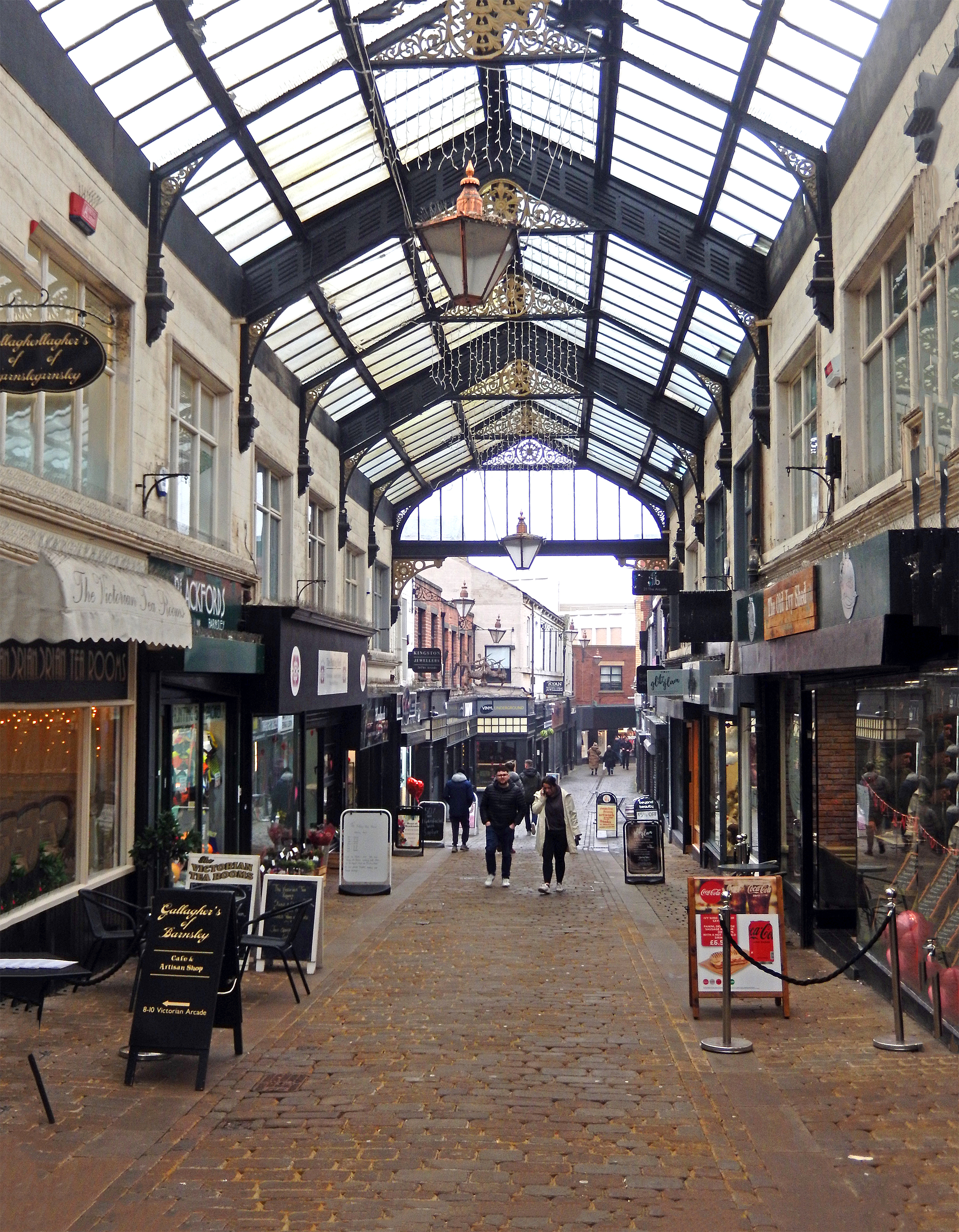
The Victorian Arcade

Major companies in Barnsley include on-line retailer ASOS; the largest cake bakery in Europe, Premier Foods (formerly Lyons Bakery) which makes the Mr Kipling Cake brand; Ardagh Glass, glass bottle makers; Symphony Kitchens; and Premdor. Most of these businesses are based on industrial parks outside the town centre, including many on reclaimed former coal mine sites. The town centre is now moving towards a service economy.

In June 2024, unemployment stood at 3.4% in Barnsley North and 4.1% in Barnsley South, compared to the national level of 3.9%.

The western half of the borough stretches from the M1 to the edge of the Peak District and is rural in character. This western part includes the market town of Penistone and Wentworth Castle and its Grade I listed gardens, Cannon Hall Park and Museum, Cawthorne Jubilee Museum, Wortley Hall and gardens, and Wortley Top Forge (16th century Forge).

In 2002, Barnsley Council and partners launched a consultation, "Rethinking Barnsley". It led to a regeneration programme centred on the town centre which is still underway. Developments included the transport interchange, a cultural centre in the old Civic Hall, a Digital Media Centre (opened August 2007), and new offices and apartments throughout the town centre. At the same time new housing areas were developed. Business parks on the M1 at Junctions 37 and 36, and in the Dearne Valley, have expanded job opportunities. Unemployment is now below the national average. The economic development of Barnsley is led by the Barnsley Development Agency.

=== Economic History ===
The town was known for a thriving linen trade prior to the arrival of the coal industry. From the 1850s onwards, a large number of coal pits were opened, mostly in the villages surrounding the town, especially those to the east. Coal mining was the major industry of the town until the late 1950s, when a long-term decline set in. All the mines in the borough are now closed, the last to shut being Goldthorpe Colliery in 1994. Wire, linen and glass making were also major industries, but only glass making remains, with one company still operating. The coat of arms for the town has both a coal miner and a glass-blower supporting a shield and depicting local families and other industries, above a ribbon bearing the town's motto, Spectemur agendo ("Let us be judged by our acts").

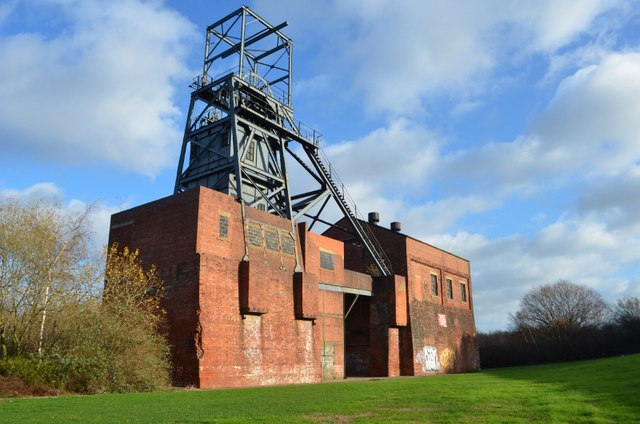
Barnsley Main Colliery

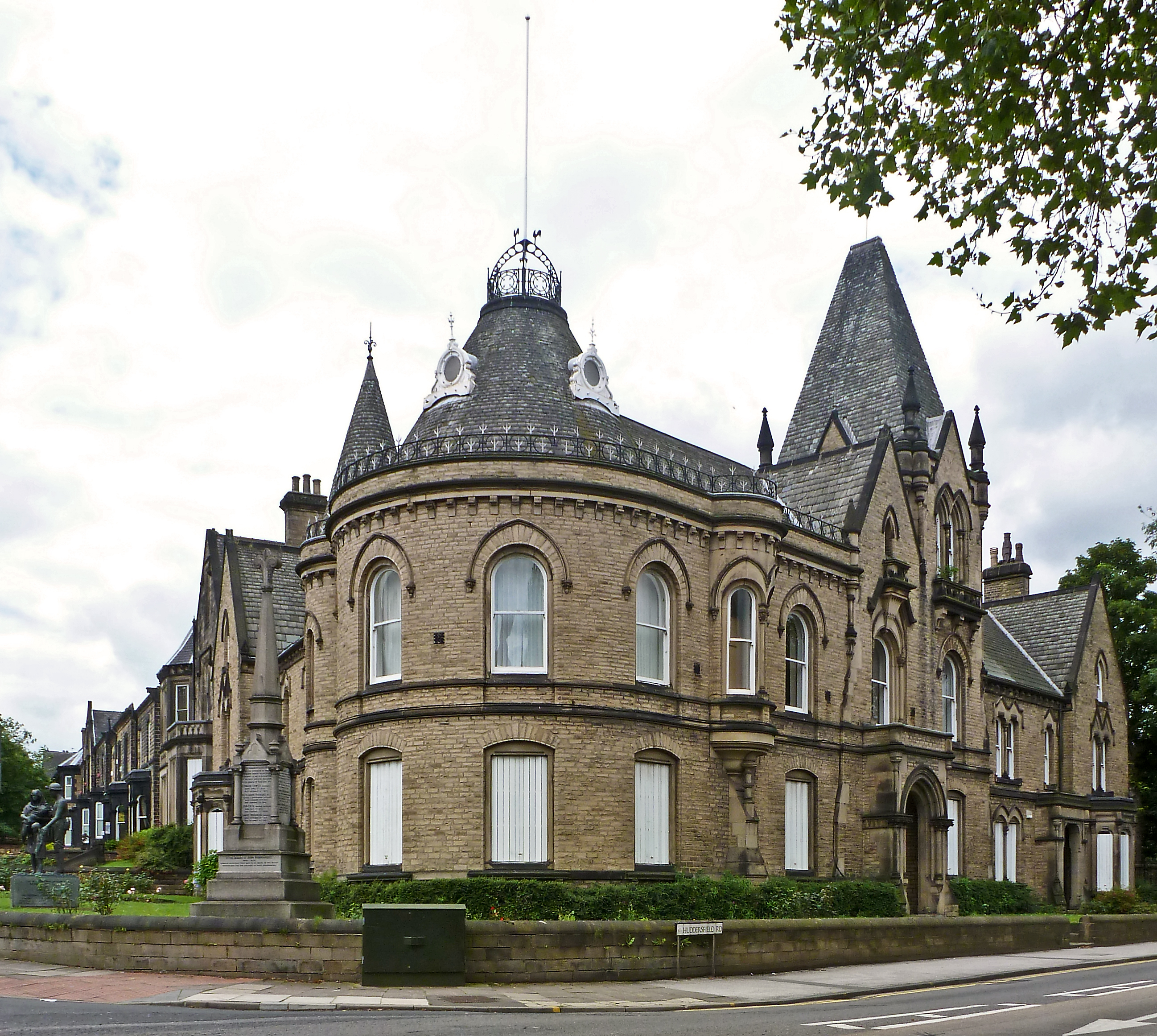
The National Union of Mineworkers' headquarters

== Landmarks ==
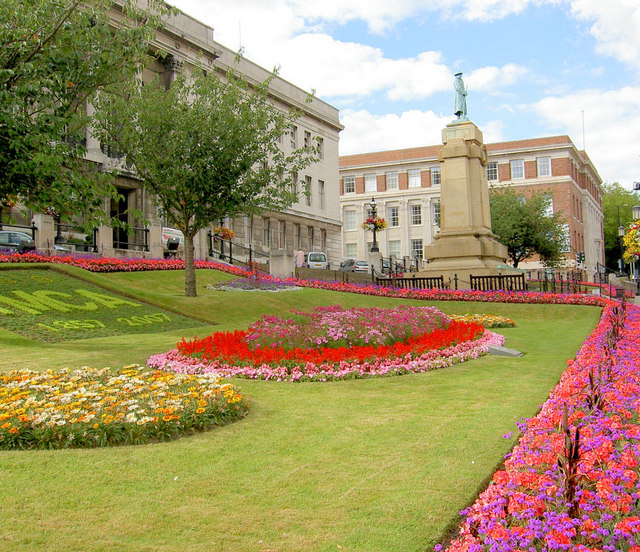
Barnsley Town Hall

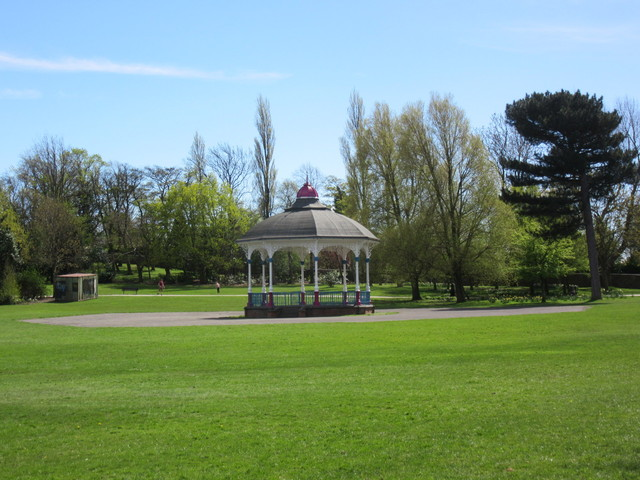
Locke Park

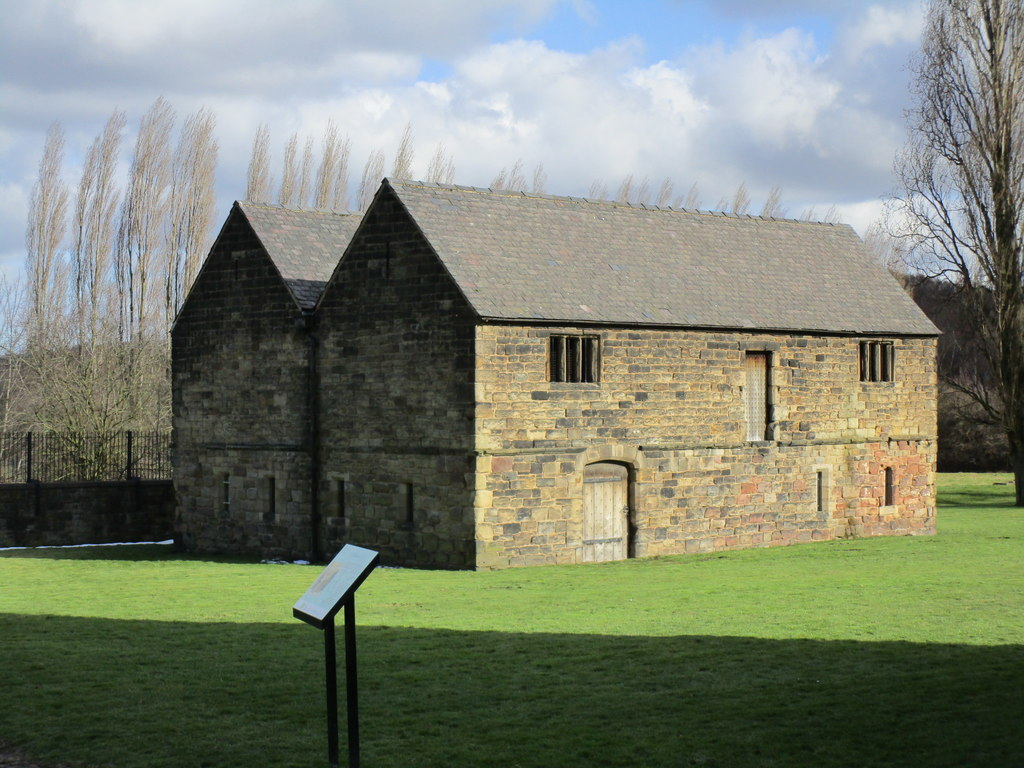
Monk Bretton Priory

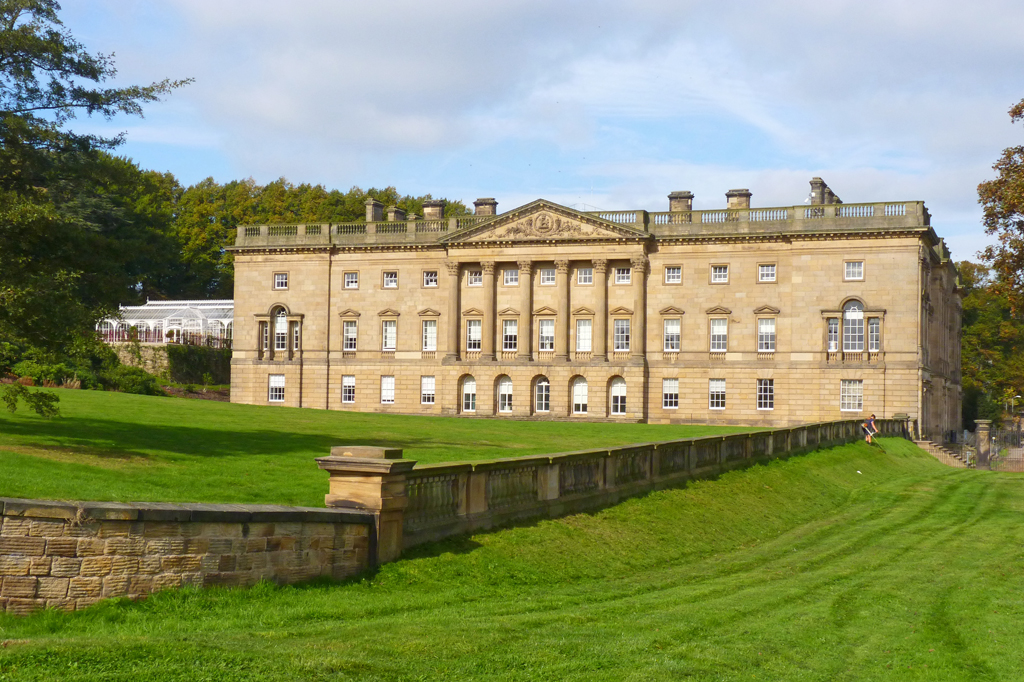
Wentworth Castle

- Barnsley Town Hall, recently turned into Experience Barnsley, a locally focused museum
- Cannon Hall, a Museum, Park & Gardens in Cawthorne
- Cannon Hall Farm, working farm and tourist attraction in Cawthorne
- The Civic, an 1877 listed building now housing a theatre and art gallery
- Houndhill, Worsbrough
- Locke Park
- Monk Bretton Priory, Monk Bretton
- Oakwell Stadium football ground, home of Barnsley Football Club
- Wentworth Castle, country house and gardens in Stainborough
- Barnsley Main, a Grade II listed building and the last remaining pithead in Barnsley, currently under development.

The first bottle bank for glass recycling collection in the United Kingdom was introduced by both Stanley Race CBE, then president of the Glass Manufacturers' Federation and major employer Redfearn's (now Ardagh Glass) and Ron England in Barnsley. The bottle bank opened on 24 August 1977.

== Transport ==
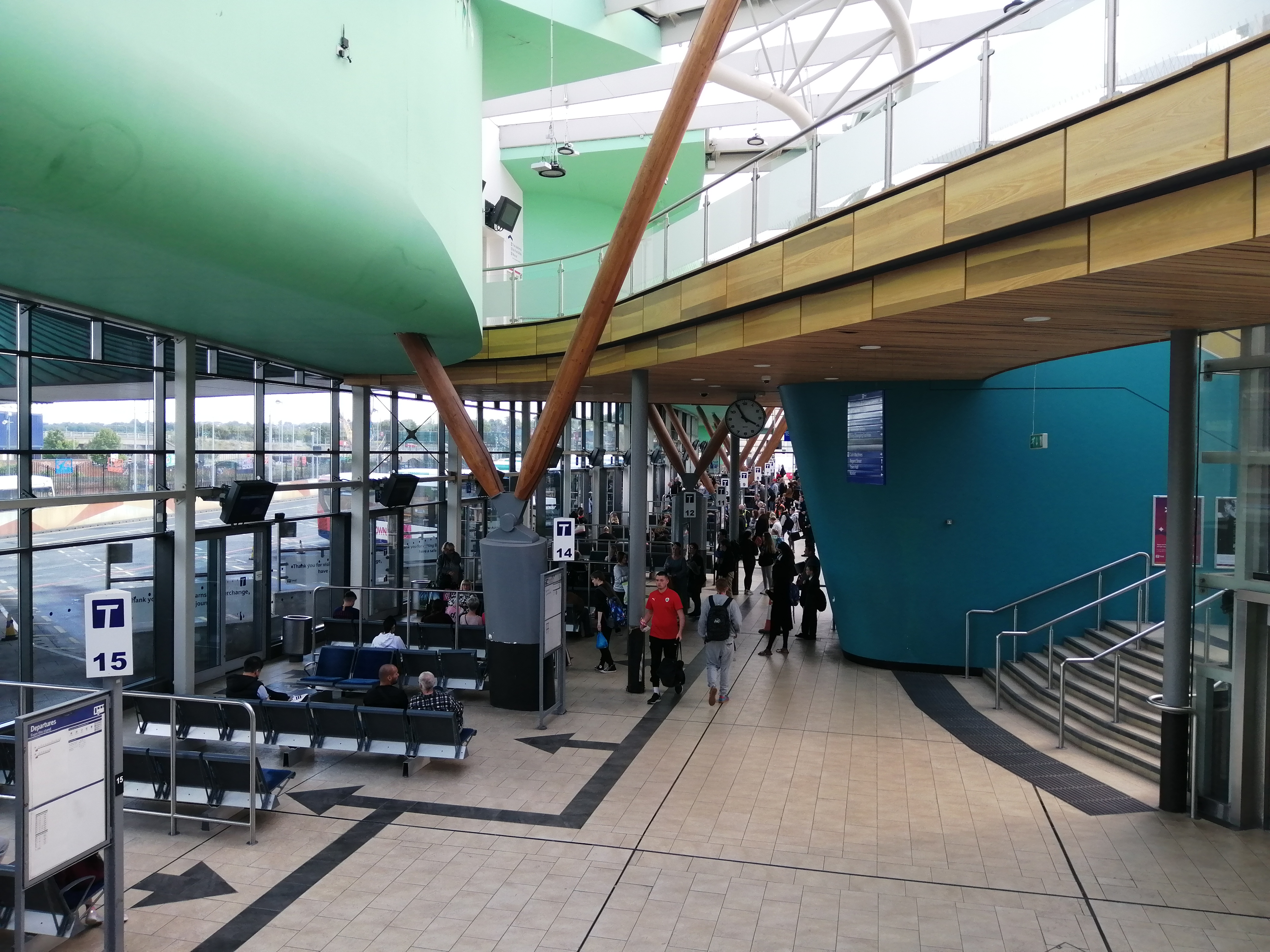
Inside Barnsley Interchange

The main transport hub is Barnsley Interchange, a combined railway and bus station that was opened on 20 May 2007; it was the first project of the Remaking Barnsley scheme.

=== Buses ===
Stagecoach Yorkshire operates most bus services within the borough, operating from the interchange. Routes connect the town with Sheffield, Doncaster, Rotherham and Penistone.

=== Railway ===
Passenger services are provided by Northern Trains on the Hallam and Penistone Lines. Routes connect the town with Leeds, Castleford, Nottingham, Lincoln, Sheffield and Huddersfield.

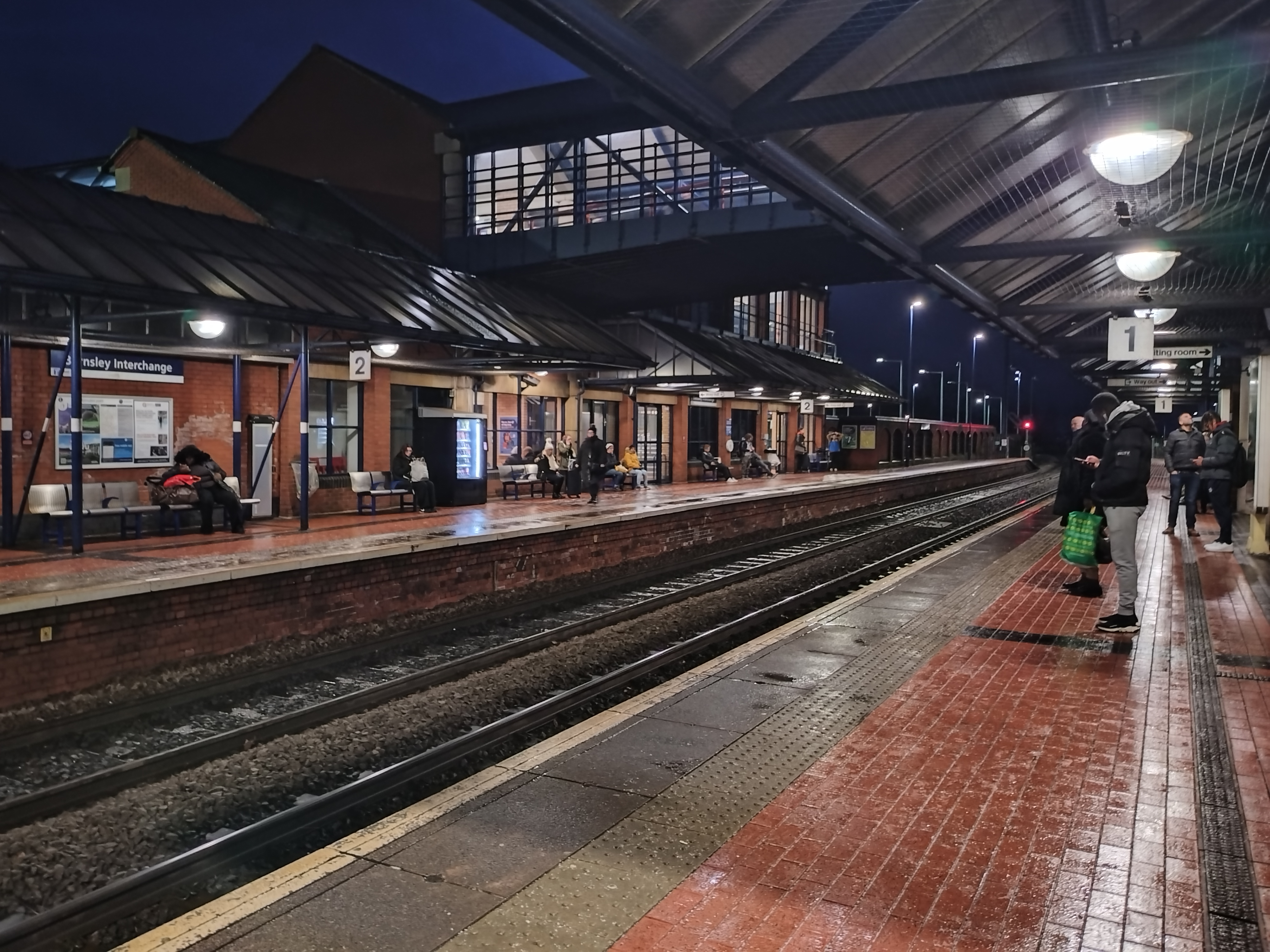
Barnsley interchange railway platform

The borough is also served by:

- Dodworth lies west of the town centre, on the Penistone Line
- Darton is in north Barnsley, on the Hallam Line.

=== Air ===
Since the closure of Robin Hood Airport, the nearest airport is Leeds Bradford, approximately 31 miles (50 km) away.

== Education ==
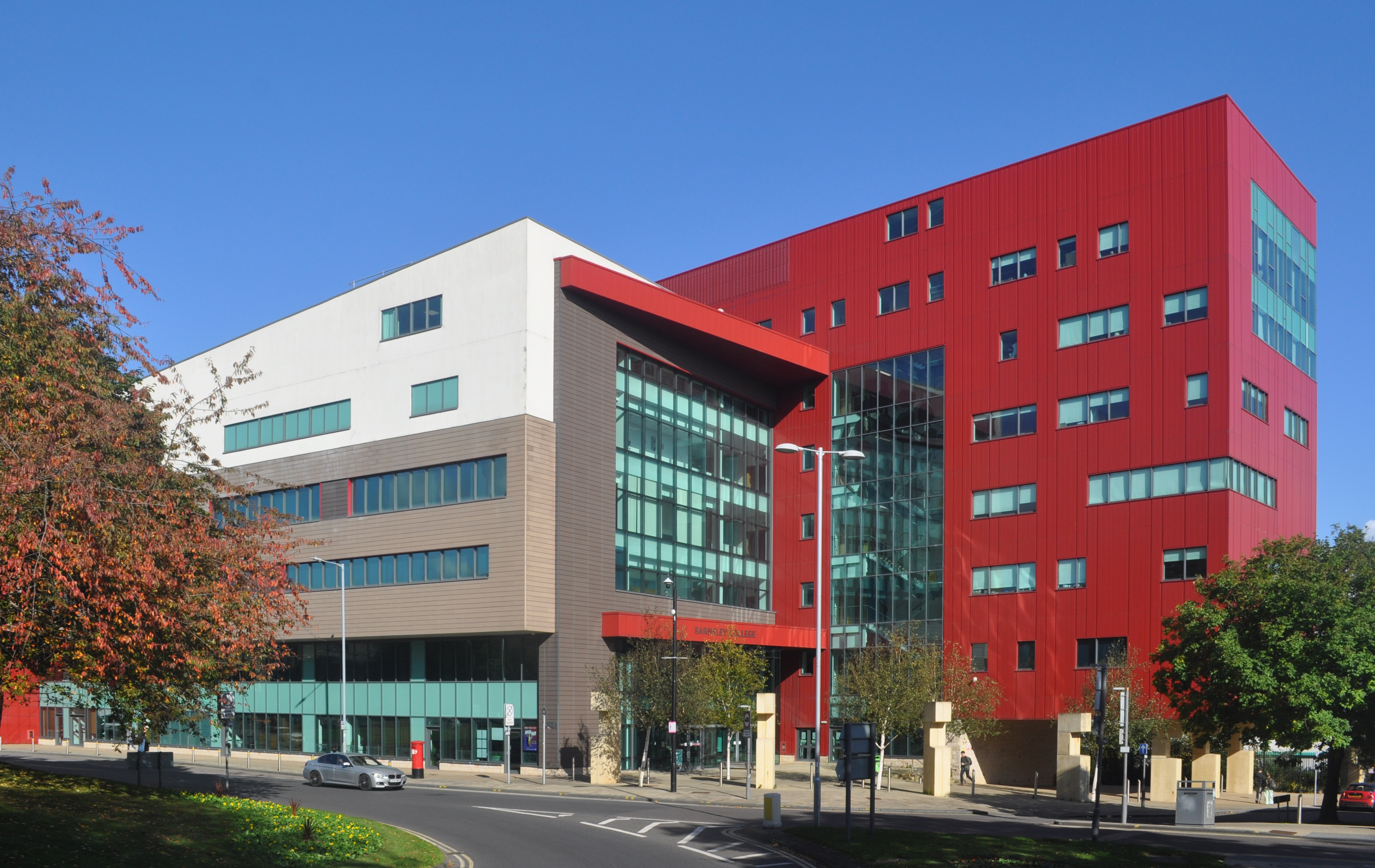
Barnsley College

Barnsley College is situated on a number of sites throughout the town centre, chiefly Old Mill Lane campus, SciTech Centre, Honeywell sports campus, CUBE Construction Centre and STEM Centre. The University of Huddersfield has recently opened a campus in the town on Church Street, beside Barnsley Town Hall; this is known as the University Campus Barnsley.

All 14 secondary schools in Barnsley were demolished and replaced by academy education centres, named SuperSchools. These combined all the previous LEA run comprehensive schools in the area into newly PFI built academies under the Building Schools for the Future programme.

== Culture ==
=== Theatre ===
The Civic, in the town centre, is a multi-purpose performance venue in a grade II listed building. The building was originally the Barnsley Mechanics Institute and Public Hall, built by Henry Harvey in 1877. His brother Charles Harvey, gave the building to the people of the town a few years later, renaming it the Harvey Institute. The Harvey Institute was host to many types of entertainment, including variety shows and cinema. It was also home to the public library and shops; public meetings and celebrations were held in the hall; and education was provided. The School of Art occupied the Public Hall from 1878 to 1948, which was also used as first headquarters and billets for "Barnsley Pals" during World War I. In 1962, the building became Barnsley Civic Theatre, closing in 1998.

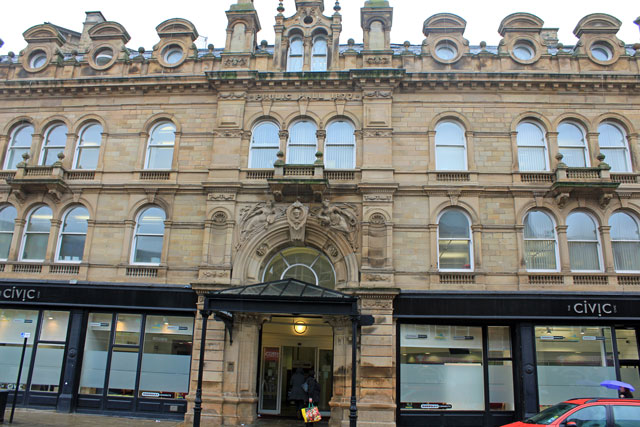
The Civic Hall

The Civic was reopened in March 2009 after a major redevelopment, which included provision for a theatre and public art gallery. The Civic has hosted high-profile acts such as Al Murray and Russell Howard. The Civic houses a contemporary art gallery that hosts touring exhibition from the V&A and the Flow Gallery in London. The Civic also curates its own work for touring.

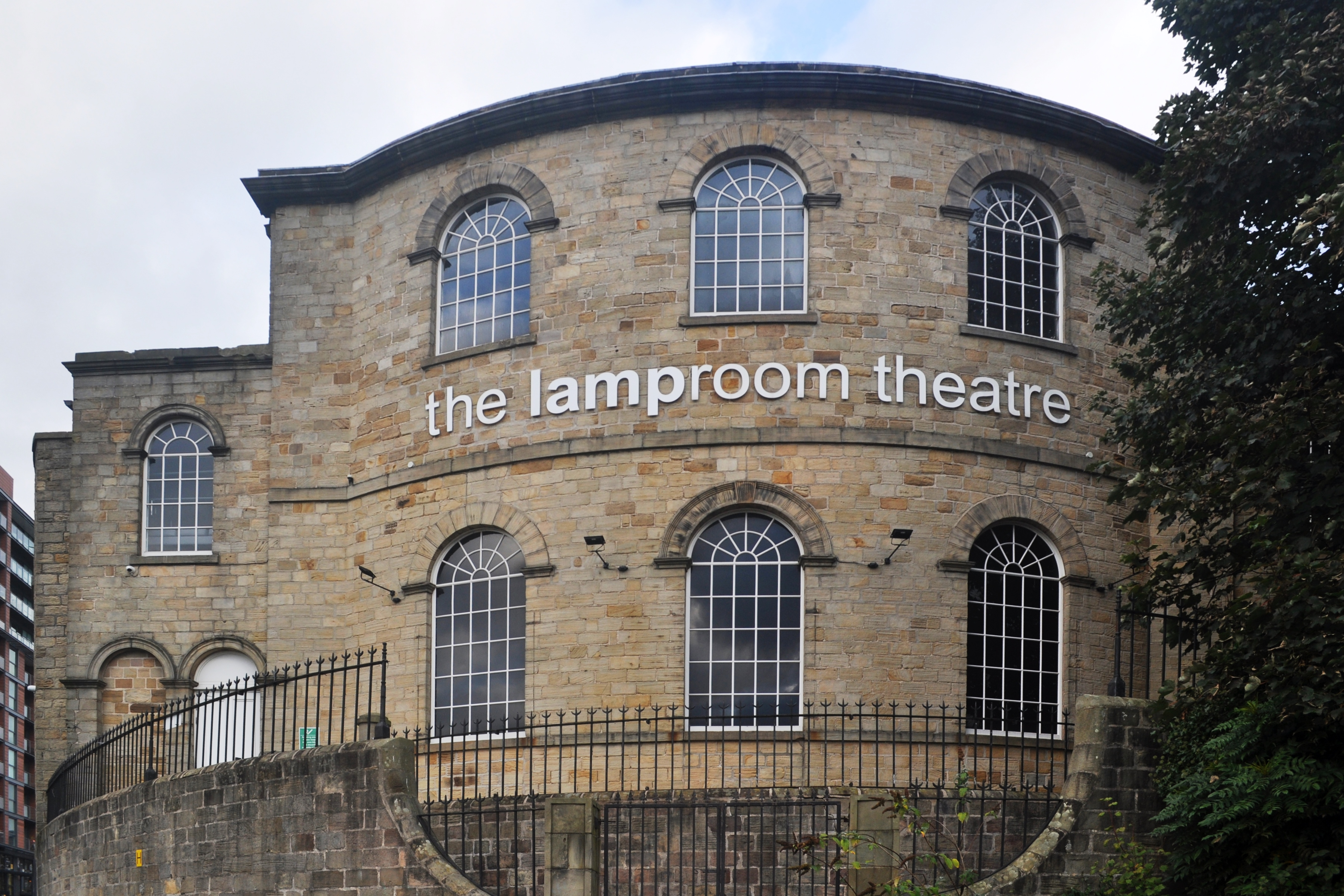
The Lamproom Theatre

The Lamproom Theatre has four theatrical companies, and showcases theatre in the town.

The Academy Theatre is part of the Take 2 Centre, where performances range from comedy to musicals. The Take 2 Centre houses The Take 2 Performing Arts Academy, The Stage Door Restaurant, and The Take 2 Music Centre.

=== Museums and galleries ===
Barnsley Council operates five museums: Elsecar Heritage Centre, Cannon Hall, the Cooper Gallery Worsbrough Mill and Experience Barnsley, which opened in the Town Hall in 2015. Other museums in Barnsley include the volunteer-run Darfield Museum and the Cawthorne Victoria Jubilee Museum. Other heritage sites include Wortley Top Forge, Wortley Hall, Wentworth Castle, Monk Bretton Priory and Pot House Hamlet.

HIVE Gallery is a contemporary art gallery set up in 2007. It is in Elsecar Heritage Centre and puts on eight contemporary art exhibitions per year. The HIVE programme ranges from supporting emerging contemporary artists to exhibiting the work of nationally and internationally known artists.

=== Music ===
Barnsley is home to a tradition of brass bands, which were originally created as social clubs for the mining communities. Grimethorpe Colliery Band, located in Grimethorpe, 5 miles (8 km) to the east of Barnsley, is perhaps the best known brass band in Britain. It rose to fame in the film Brassed Off and is now the 'artist in residence' at the Royal College of Music, London. The band has performed in Hyde Park during the Last Night of the Proms. Other events include Picnic In The Park, being held annually to raise funds for Barnsley Hospice.

There is a live rock and hip hop music scene, which reached its height in the Britpop years, around 1997, due to its close proximity to Sheffield and Manchester. The 1980s saw the rise of Saxon (metal band), Danse Society (Goth) and Party Day (Indie-rock). Both Alex Turner and Matt Helders, of the Arctic Monkeys, studied music at Barnsley College.

Barnsley is the home of several live music venues such as The Underground, The Garrison, The Old No 7 and The Old School House. It formerly hosted the Barnsley Origin Music festival (BOMfest), an outdoor summer music festival which catered for local and national artists. It now hosts Barnsley Live, an annual music festival featuring local acts that takes place in the town centre over a weekend in June, until it was announced to no longer go on by festival organisers in 2025.

In December 2023, a Christmas carol, written by local musician Arthur Godfrey in 1933, was rediscovered in the archives of the Barnsley Chronicle. It was rerecorded to celebrate the 90th birthday of the town hall.

=== Other arts ===
The "Bard of Barnsley" Ian McMillan writes a column in the Barnsley Chronicle. He was nominated for a chair of poetry at Oxford University and appears on BBC Radio 4.

It was reported that Barnsley is the most frequently defined sub-Yorkshire dialect in interviews on attitudes to local dialects, with the fronted [a:] in the first syllable of the town's name often cited. An article in the Transactions of the Yorkshire Dialect Society noted that it is a relatively recent notion that Barnsley is distinctive and that most traditional dialect writing saw Barnsley as much the same as neighbouring areas of the West Riding. It is suggested either that Barnsley has not undergone the dialect levelling that has occurred in other parts of Yorkshire or that Barnsley has become better-known in the media through films set around Barnsley such as Kes and The Price of Coal, both of which were adapted by scripts from local writer Barry Hines by director Ken Loach.

The developers of the 2024 adventure game Thank Goodness You're Here! are from Barnsley and serves as the primary basis for the game's setting of Barnsworth.

== Media ==
Regional television is provided by BBC Yorkshire and ITV Yorkshire. Television signals are received from the Emley Moor TV transmitter.

Local radio stations are BBC Radio Sheffield, Greatest Hits Radio South Yorkshire, Heart Yorkshire, Capital Yorkshire and Hits Radio South Yorkshire.

The town is served by these local newspapers:

- Barnsley Chronicle
- The Star
- We Are Barnsley, an online newspaper.

== Sport ==
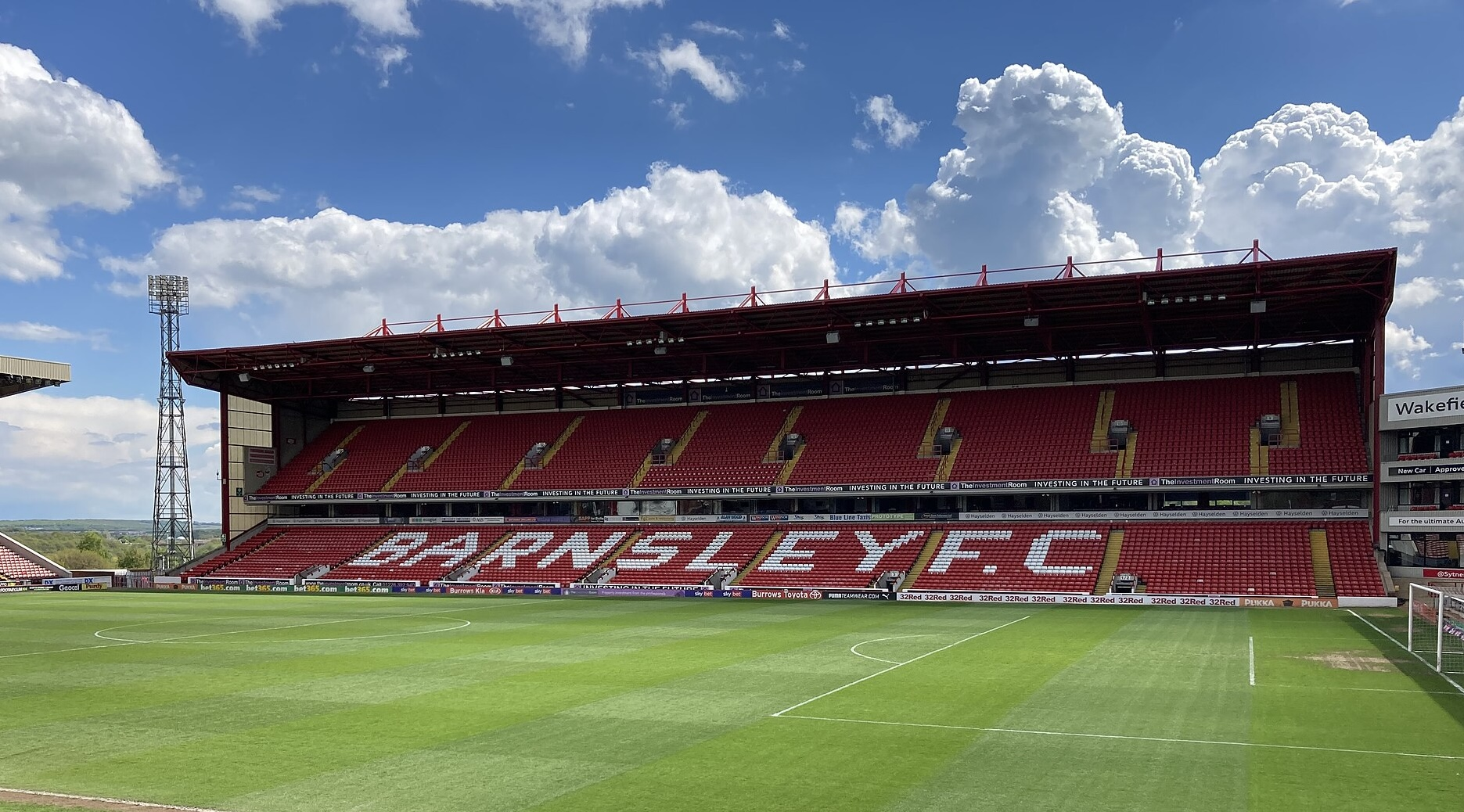
Oakwell Stadium

Barnsley F.C. play in League One, the third tier of English football. Their home ground, Oakwell Stadium is situated in Oakwell, just outside the town centre. The club has had a mixed recent history. In the late 1990s, they had a brief spell in the Premier League, but were relegated after one season. Subsequent seasons saw them relegated to the third tier of English football; they were promoted to the second tier in 2006, beating Swansea in the play off final. They were relegated in the 2013–14 season. After two seasons, Barnsley regained a place in the second tier, following a victory at Wembley in the 2016 Football League One play-off final, and the winners of the 2016 Football League Trophy Final. They were again relegated to the third tier at the end of the 2017–18 season.

Also in Barnsley, there is a women's football team called Barnsley WFC, who currently play in the North East Regional Women's Football League Premier Division.

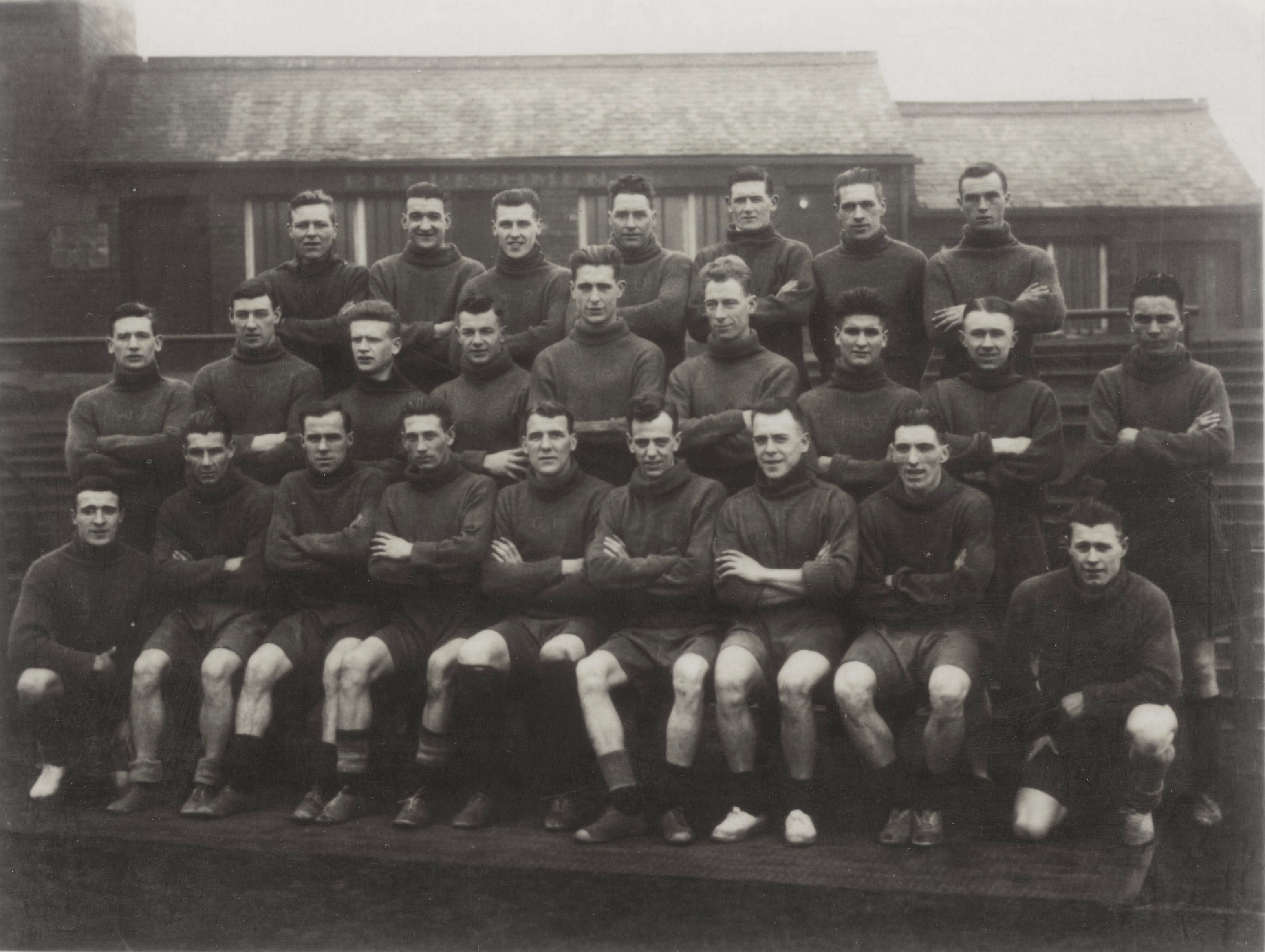
Barnsley team photo 1930–1931

Speedway racing was staged at a track near Barnsley at Lundwood. The track entered a team in the Northern Leagues of 1929 and 1930. Two-time British Under-21 Championship rider Josh Bates hails from the town. Greyhound racing was held at Dillington Park Stadium from 1934 -1990 and at the Dearne Athletic and Sports Stadium in Old Mill Lane, from 1934 to 1935. A third venue at the Queen's Ground was refused three times by the Corporation in 1936.

Rugby league is played in the town, at a number of clubs, past and present:

- Dodworth ARLFC played in the second division of the BARLA-run Pennine League, playing through the winter; it plays at the Miners' Welfare ground in Dodworth until deteriorating player participation forced the club to fold five games into the 2013/14 season
- The same fate befell Hoyland Vikings ARLFC, prompting talk of a merger. This however failed to materialise leaving only one club to represent the town
- The only representation now comes from the Dearne Valley Bulldogs in nearby Bolton on Dearne. Like Dodworth and Hoyland, it participates in the Pennine League
- Barnsley Broncos play in the RFL conference, which is a summer competition and runs from May to September. Also based at the Miners Welfare, Barnsley Broncos were set up to play in the less intense summer season.

Shaw Lane is the home to many sports in town, cricket, rugby union, squash, bowls, football, athletics and archery are all played to a high standard and host many of the towns teams including Barnsley CC and Barnsley RUFC. Peoples Sport in Barnsley is a project writing the history of participation in sport in Barnsley is in progress and is expected to be complete in 2015.

The town is home to Barnsley Harriers, a nationally recognised running club, and a high standard badminton league, with three separate tiers.

Ardsley Golf Club first appeared in the 1930s. The club disappeared at the onset of the Second World War. Golf can still be played at Hillies in Wombwell and there is also a driving range at Staincross.

There are a number of cycling clubs, including Barnsley Road Club itself, the long-established Birdwell Wheelers and Team Cystic Fibrosis (a charity-focused team), together covering many different forms of cycle sport and leisure. There have also been various other initiatives set up to promote cycling in the town and district of Barnsley.

== International relations ==
Barnsley is twinned with:

- Schwäbisch Gmünd, Germany
- Horlivka, Ukraine.

== Notable people ==
- Bethany England (born 1994), professional football player for Crystal Palace and the England national team
- Joann Fletcher (born 1966), Egyptologist, born in Barnsley
- Brian Glover (1934–1997), actor and wrestler who grew up in Barnsley
- Joanne Harris (born 1964), author, born and brought up in Barnsley.
- Stephanie Hirst (born 1975) radio and television presenter, Born in Barnsley.
- Callum Simpson (1996–), British professional boxer. He held the British and Commonwealth super middleweight titles from August 2024 until December 2025.
- John Stones (born 1994), professional football player for Inter Milan and the England national team
- The Bar-Steward Sons of Val Doonican comedy folk band, founded by lead singer, Scott Doonican, in Barnsley in 2006 to present day.
- Oliver Rowland (born 1992), professional racing driver competing in Formula E. He won the 2024–25 Formula E World Championship with Nissan.
- Lauren Tate (born 1997), vocalist, songwriter and producer, formerly the frontwoman of Hands Off Gretel. She currently releases music under the pseudonym Delilah Bon.
- Hudson Taylor (born 1832, died 1905), English missionary to China and founder of the China Inland Mission.

== Freedom of the Town ==
The following people, military units and organisations and groups have received the Freedom of the Town of Barnsley.

=== Individuals ===
- Henry Horsfield (Town Clerk): 1912
- Charles Wray (Alderman and former Mayor 1896–1898 and 1903–1905): 1921
- Lieut-Colonel W. E. Raley (Alderman, 34 years service to Barnsley Corporation): 1921
- David Lloyd George (Prime Minister): 1921
- Harold "Dickie" Bird: 2000.
- Rita Britton: 2000.
- Lord Mason of Barnsley: 2007.
- Dr Joann Fletcher: 7 June 2016.
- Ian McMillan: 7 June 2016.
- David Moody Lord Lieutenant of South Yorkshire: 7 June 2016.
- Kate Rusby: 7 June 2016.
- Graham Ibbeson: 15 April 2022.
- Katherine Brunt: 15 April 2022.
- Patrick Murphy artist and designer
- Katherine Kelly: 15 April 2022.

=== Military units ===
- The Light Dragoons
- The Yorkshire Regiment

=== Organisations and groups ===
- The ICU staff at Barnsley Hospital: 15 April 2022.

== See also ==
- Holy Rood Church, Barnsley
- Listed buildings in Barnsley (Central Ward)
