= Paul Fox (television executive) =

British television executive (1925–2024)

Sir Paul Fox CBE
- Born: Paul Leonard Fox; 27 October 1925; Germany
- Died: 8 April 2024 (aged 98)
- Employer(s): BBC; Yorkshire Television
- Title: Controller of BBC1 (1967–1973)
- Spouse: Betty R. Nathan (m. 1948; death 2009)
- Children: 2

Sir Paul Leonard Fox (27 October 1925 – 8 April 2024) was a British television executive and journalist, who spent much of his broadcasting career working for BBC Television, most prominently as the Controller of BBC1 between 1967 and 1973. Fox was Head of Programmes of the ITV franchise Yorkshire Television (YTV) in 1973 before becoming its managing director from 1977 to 1988. He was chairman of Independent Television News (ITN) and president of the Royal Television Society. Fox returned to the BBC in 1988 and became managing director of BBC Television on a three-year contract that ran until his retirement in 1991. Fox was appointed Commander of the Most Excellent Order of the British Empire (CBE) and was made a Knight Bachelor. He was a recipient of the International Emmy Founders Award and the BAFTA Fellowship.

== Early life ==
Paul Leonard Fox was born on 27 October 1925, in Germany to Jewish parents. After the early death of his father Walter, a doctor, to suicide, and the death of his nurse mother and grandmother in a concentration camp during The Holocaust, he came to Parkeston Quay, Harwich on a kindertransport in 1938. He was adopted by a medical family, and was reluctant to discuss his childhood. Fox was brought up in Bournemouth. He was educated at Bournemouth Grammar School, and did not attend university, thinking he was too old for it. Fox left his foster family when he was 16 to live in a boys hostel in London and seek employment. When he turned 18 and after leaving school, he volunteered to enlist in the Parachute Regiment, 6th Airborne Division and trained as a parachutist. Fox was wounded in the left arm by German fire during the crossing of the Rhine in March 1945, leaving one arm shorter than the other.

== Early career and BBC career ==
After he was demobilised in 1946, Fox enrolled on a journalism course at the American Forces University set up by the United States Military in Biarritz in France for six months that equated to one term. He wrote to 100 newspapers enquiring about jobs, and was employed as a junior reporter for the Kentish Times newspaper in 1946, covering the Dartford and Sidcup districts. Fox went on to work at The People newspaper in Fleet Street in 1947, before going on to work at Pathé News as a scriptwriter in 1947. This work led to him answering an advertisement to apply for summer relief work with the BBC. He began his career at the corporation in 1950, writing scripts for the Television Newsreel programme at Alexandra Palace in North London, British television's first regular newsreel programme.

Fox went on to create and edit the first television sports magazine programme Sportsview, persuading the head of the Outside Broadcasts Department Peter Dimmock to present the show. He edited the show for six years, brought cameras to Roger Bannister's sub four-minute mile, and used technical devices such as the teleprompter, the split screen and televised interviews with players. While editing Sportsview in 1954 he hit upon the idea of creating the prestigious annual BBC Sports Personality of the Year award. In 1958, Fox co-created the Saturday afternoon sports programme Grandstand. He organised the BBC's live coverage of the 1960 Summer Olympics in Rome,

In April 1961, he had been promoted to editor of the current affairs programme Panorama when it was presented by Richard Dimbleby. Fox was the supervisor of the first live broadcast from the Soviet Union when the first man in space Yuri Gagarin returned to Earth and covered the construction of the Berlin Wall as well as the Cuban Missile Crisis. Fox later became Head of Public Affairs at BBC Television and in this role was heavily involved in the news coverage of the assassination of U.S. President John F. Kennedy on 22 November 1963 and the subsequent reaction to the events in the United Kingdom. Fox was appointed head of public affairs programmes in 1963 and then head of the current affairs group in 1965 following the retirement of Grace Wyndham Goldie. He was the producer of such specials as the 1964 United Kingdom general election and the 1966 United Kingdom general election. Fox had a negative view of politicians after Prime Minister Harold Wilson was convinced that Fox was biased against the Labour Party.

Fox established a consortium to bid for the ITV franchise Yorkshire Television (YTV) in 1967 but was unsuccessful. On 19 June 1967, he became the Controller of BBC1, replacing Michael Peacock. Fox was responsible for the channel's budget, decided which programmes should be broadcast and the management of entertainers. He held the post for six years, one of the longest tenures of any BBC Channel Controller. His achievements in the role included the launch of the sitcom Dad's Army that he dismissed at first because he told co-creator David Croft that he did not believe the war should have been a subject of comedy, and oversaw the transition of BBC1 from black-and-white into colour in 1969. He also commissioned The Two Ronnies, Bruce Forsyth and the Generation Game and the Parkinson talk show in 1971. All the Moon landings of the Apollo program occurred during his tenure, and Fox allocated generous time on his network for coverage. He organised sports coverage such as Match of the Day, the 1972 Summer Olympics in Munich and the Wimbledon Championships.

== Later career ==
Fox was expected to become managing director of BBC Television but the job went to Alasdair Milne in June 1973. He came to the conclusion he would not make any more career progression at the BBC, and YTV managing director Ward Thomas brought in Fox as Head of Programmes of YTV in August 1973, as the replacement for Donald Baverstock and joined YTV's board. Fox commissioned such programmes as the comedy show Rising Damp, the First Tuesday monthly current affairs series, the drama series Harry’s Game, Airline and The Sandbaggers, and the documentaries Johnny Go Home and Windscale: The Nuclear Laundry. He got permission from the Independent Broadcasting Authority to launch a breakfast television service for YTV in 1977. Fox went on to become the sole managing director of YTV between May 1976 and 1988 after previously holding the position jointly with Thomas, organising YTV's flotation on the London Stock Exchange in 1986. During this period he was quite vocal in his disapproval of the ultimately unsuccessful poaching in 1985 of the American soap opera Dallas from the BBC by fellow ITV contractor Thames Television. He later became a board member at Thames Television.

Whilst at YTV, Fox was prominent in representing the managerial view in the industrial dispute between members of the Association of Cinematograph, Television and Allied Technicians (ACTT) trade union and the ITV companies, which blacked out the network for three months in 1979. He served as chair of the ITV Network Programme Committee from 1978 to 1980, in which he purchased programmes for broadcast on the ITV network. Fox was chair of the Council of the Independent Television Cos. Assen Ltd from 1982 to 1984. Fox was president of the Royal Television Society (RTS) from 1985 to 1992, was a board member of Channel 4 from 1985 to 1988, and was chairman of Independent Television News (ITN) from April 1986 to 1988, having been a director for nine years from 1977 to 1986. He later accepted an offer from Michael Checkland, the Director-General of the BBC, to return to the corporation as managing director of BBC Television on a three-year contract in March 1988, replacing Bill Cotton. Fox did not employ a director of programmes. That same year, he became chair of BBC Enterprises.

He retired from the BBC at the age of 65 on 26 April 1991, after he did not request an extension to his contract. He was the leader of the ITN consortium bidding to replace the national breakfast channel TV-am, detesting its news programmes, and was unsuccessful in working with Thames Television to keep its weekday licence for London. Fox became chairman of the Racecourse Association from 1993 to 1997, director of the Horserace Betting Levy Board, chairman of DISASTERS EMERC Committee from 1996 to 1999 and a sports columnist for The Daily Telegraph from 1991 to 2003. He was on the Sheehy inquiry into the future of policing but its recommendations were rejected by Michael Howard, the Home Secretary, further denting his opinion of politicians. Fox was a member of the Liberal Jewish Synagogue and the Garrick Club, and was a contributor of articles to The Listener.

== Personal life ==
He married Betty R. Nathan in 1948. She predeceased him in 2009. They had two sons, one of whom, Jeremy, became a television producer. Fox died of complications from a stroke on 8 April 2024, at the age of 98.

== Honours ==
Fox was the recipient of the Cyril Bennett Award at the RTS Programme Awards in 1984 "for an outstanding contribution to television programming". He was appointed Commander of the Most Excellent Order of the British Empire (CBE) in the 1985 New Year Honours. Fox was presented with the International Emmy Founders Award in 1989, and was awarded the BAFTA Fellowship from the British Academy of Film and Television Arts in 1990. He was made a Knight Bachelor in the 1991 New Year Honours "for services to the TV industry". Fox was awarded the honorary degree of Doctor of Laws (LL.D.) by the University of Leeds in 1984, and the honorary degree of Doctor of Letters (D.Litt.) from the University of Bradford in December 1991, and the RTS Gold Medal for Outstanding Services to Television in 1992.

Cultural offices
Preceded by Huw Wheldon	President of the Royal Television Society; 1985–1992	Succeeded by Bill Cotton
Media offices
Preceded by Michael Peacock	Controller of BBC1; 1967–1973	Succeeded by Bryan Cowgill
