= Hotheaded Naked Ice Borer =

Fictional animal

Hotheaded Naked Ice Borer

The Hotheaded Naked Ice Borer is a fictional animal invented by Discover magazine as an April Fool's Day joke.

A short article on the Hotheaded Naked Ice Borer first appeared in the April 1995 issue of Discover magazine. The article was written by Tim Folger, then an editor of the periodical. Folger wrote several other April Fool's stories for the magazine, including a basketball-sized particle named the "bigon", and the discovery of prehistoric musical instruments— rhinoceros bladder bagpipes, a mastodon-tusk tuba, and a bone triangle—supposedly used by Neanderthals.

== Hoax ==
The article carried a purported photo of a Naked mole rat-like creature with a bony growth protruding from its head. According to the article, this animal had recently been discovered in Antarctica. The bony structure was suffused with tiny blood vessels that would heat it to a temperature high enough to melt through the ice. To acquire food, a group of these animals would burrow into the ice underneath suitable prey, and use their heads to melt through. When the animal, usually a penguin, sank helplessly into the water, the group of Borers would devour it. It was even speculated in the article that Antarctic explorer "Philippe Poisson" (poisson d'avril, "April fish," is the French equivalent of "April fool") may have been eaten by a group of these animals when he disappeared in 1837.

A clue that indicated that the Ice Borer story was a hoax can be found in the name of the biologist who discovered the animal, "Aprile Pazzo" ("April Fool" in Italian). Cleber Redondo, a deputy art director, created the image by digitally manipulating a photograph of a naked mole-rat, adding fangs and a "bony growth" (based on a trilobite) with a "red-hot" front edge.

== Influence ==
Discover magazine received more mail about this article than about any other article it had ever published. A number of zoo officials and scientists sent humorous letters to the magazine asking how they could acquire specimens of the creature. Ripley's Believe It or Not! picked up the story and ran it as a real news item. The story was repeated as true in The Unofficial X-Files Companion.

The creature was featured in Godzilla: The Series as an enemy kaiju.

In the game Subnautica: Below Zero, the Ice Worm leviathan is likely based on the Ice Borer, as both creatures possess a "hot bone" in their heads that helps them to melt through ice to hunt for prey.

== See also ==
- Pacific Northwest tree octopus
- Flying penguin hoax
- Spaghetti-tree hoax
- House hippo
- Drop bear
