= Enid (film) =

- Film cover
- Written by: Lindsay Shapero
- Directed by: James Hawes
- Starring: Helena Bonham Carter; Matthew Macfadyen; Denis Lawson
- Music by: Nicholas Hooper
- Country of origin: United Kingdom
- Original language: English

Production
- Producers: Sally Woodward Gentle; Lee Morris; Eleanor Moran; Jamie Laurenson
- Cinematography: Matt Gray
- Editor: Richard Cox
- Running time: 82 minutes
- Production company: Carnival Films

Original release
- Network: BBC Four
- Release: 16 November 2009

Enid is a 2009 British biographical television film first broadcast on 16 November on BBC Four. Directed by James Hawes, it is based on the life of children's writer Enid Blyton, portrayed by Helena Bonham Carter. The film introduced the two main lovers of Blyton's life. Her first husband Hugh Pollock, who was also her publisher, was played by Matthew Macfadyen. Kenneth Darrell Waters, a London surgeon who became Blyton's second husband, was portrayed by Denis Lawson. The film explored how the orderly, reassuringly clear worlds Blyton created within her stories contrasted with the complexity of her own personal life.

== Cast ==
- Helena Bonham Carter as Enid Blyton
- Matthew Macfadyen as Hugh Pollock, Blyton's publisher, first husband, and father of her two daughters Gillian and Imogen.
- Denis Lawson as Kenneth Darrell Waters: A London surgeon who becomes Blyton's second husband following her divorce from Pollock.
- Travis Oliver as Corporal Alexander Morris
- Ramona Marquez as Imogen Pollock
- Sinead Michael as Gillian Pollock
- Claire Rushbrook as Dorothy Richards
- Joseph Millson as Hanly Blyton
- Pooky Quesnel as Theresa Blyton
- Philip Wright as Thomas Blyton
- Lisa Diveney as Enid Blyton (aged 19)
- Alexandra Brain as Enid Blyton (aged 12)
- Samuel Hilton as Hanly Blyton (aged 8)
- James Warner as Carey Blyton (aged 4)
- Eileen O'Higgins as Maid Maggie
- Gabrielle Reidy as Mrs Waters
- Sion Davies as Boy at party
- Isabella Blake-Thomas as Girl at party

== Accolades ==
Award	Category	Recipient	Result
Broadcasting Press Guild	Best Single Drama	Enid	Won
Broadcasting Press Guild	Best Actress	Helena Bonham Carter	Nominated
BAFTA TV Awards	Best Actress	Helena Bonham Carter	Nominated
International Emmy Award	Best Actress	Helena Bonham Carter	Won

== Production ==
The film was filmed in London and Surrey in Britain. The film is a "major one-off" drama for Carnival Film & Television for BBC Four.
