= BAFTA Fellowship =

British film industry award

- Awarded for: In recognition of outstanding achievement in the art forms of the moving image
- Country: United Kingdom
- Presented by: British Academy of Film and Television Arts (BAFTA)
- First award: 1971
- Website: bafta.org

The BAFTA Fellowship, or the Academy Fellowship, is a lifetime achievement award presented by the British Academy of Film and Television Arts (BAFTA) in recognition of "outstanding achievement in the art forms of the moving image". The award is the highest honour the Academy can bestow, and has been awarded annually since 1971.

Fellowship recipients have mainly been film directors, but some have been awarded to actors, film/television producers, cinematographers, film editors, screenwriters, and since 2007, contributors to the video game industry. In 2002, Merchant Ivory Productions became the first organisation to win the award. People from the United Kingdom dominate the list, but it includes over a dozen U.S. citizens and several from other countries in Europe, though none of the latter have been recognised since 1996. In 2010, Shigeru Miyamoto became the first citizen of an Asian country to receive the award.

The inaugural recipient of the award was the filmmaker Alfred Hitchcock. It has been given posthumously to the comedy pair Morecambe and Wise in 1999, and to Stanley Kubrick, who died that year and was made a fellow in 2000. 2012 winner Rolf Harris is the only person to have had the award subsequently annulled.

== Recipients ==
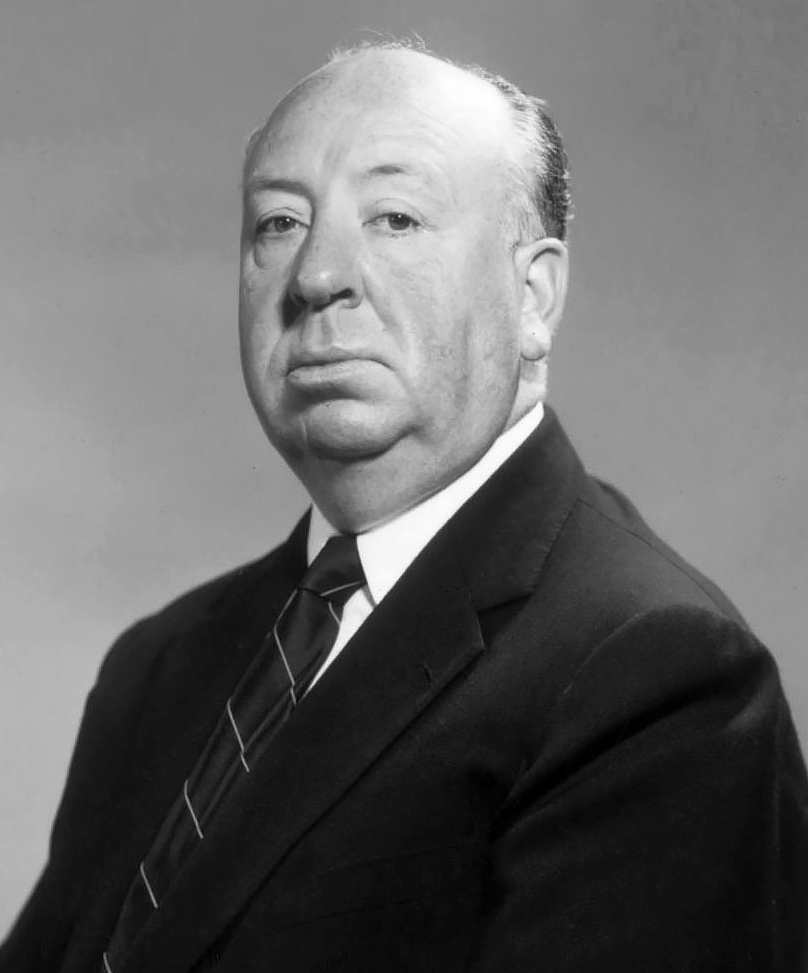
Alfred Hitchcock was the inaugural winner in 1971.

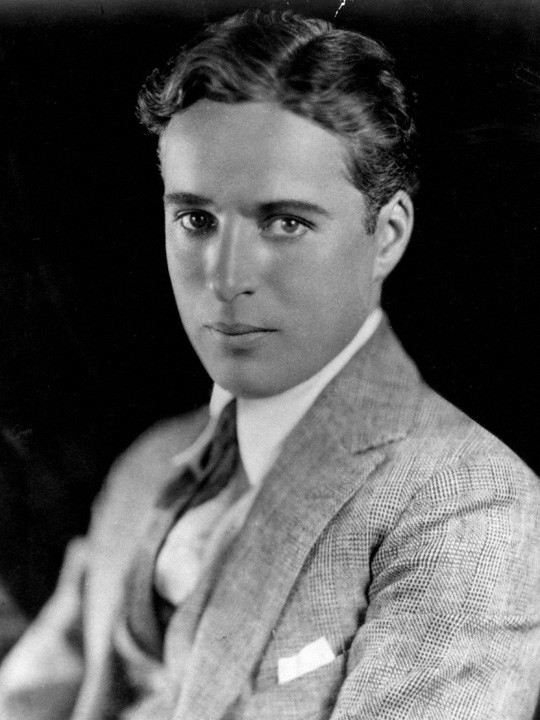
Charlie Chaplin won in 1976.

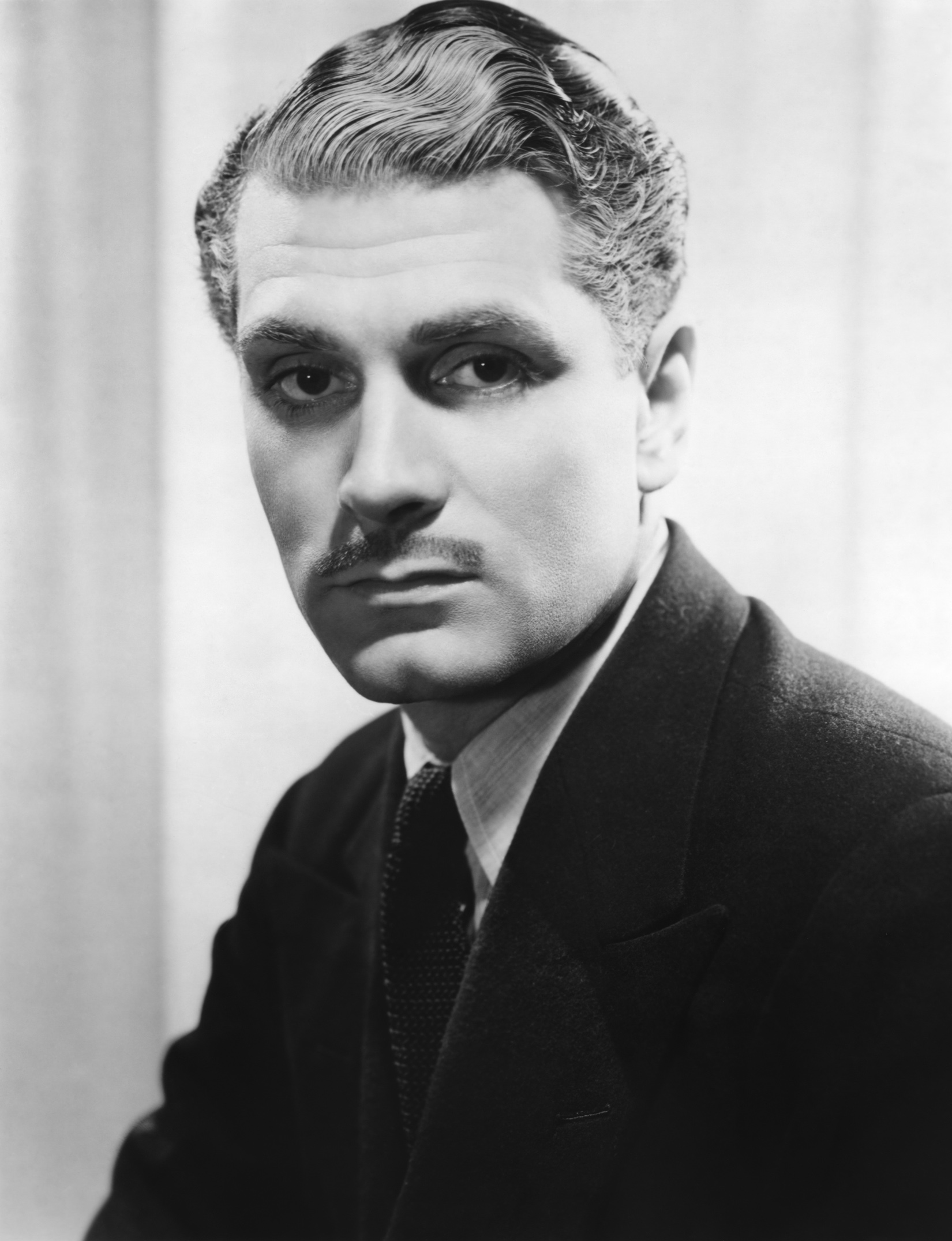
Laurence Olivier won in 1976.

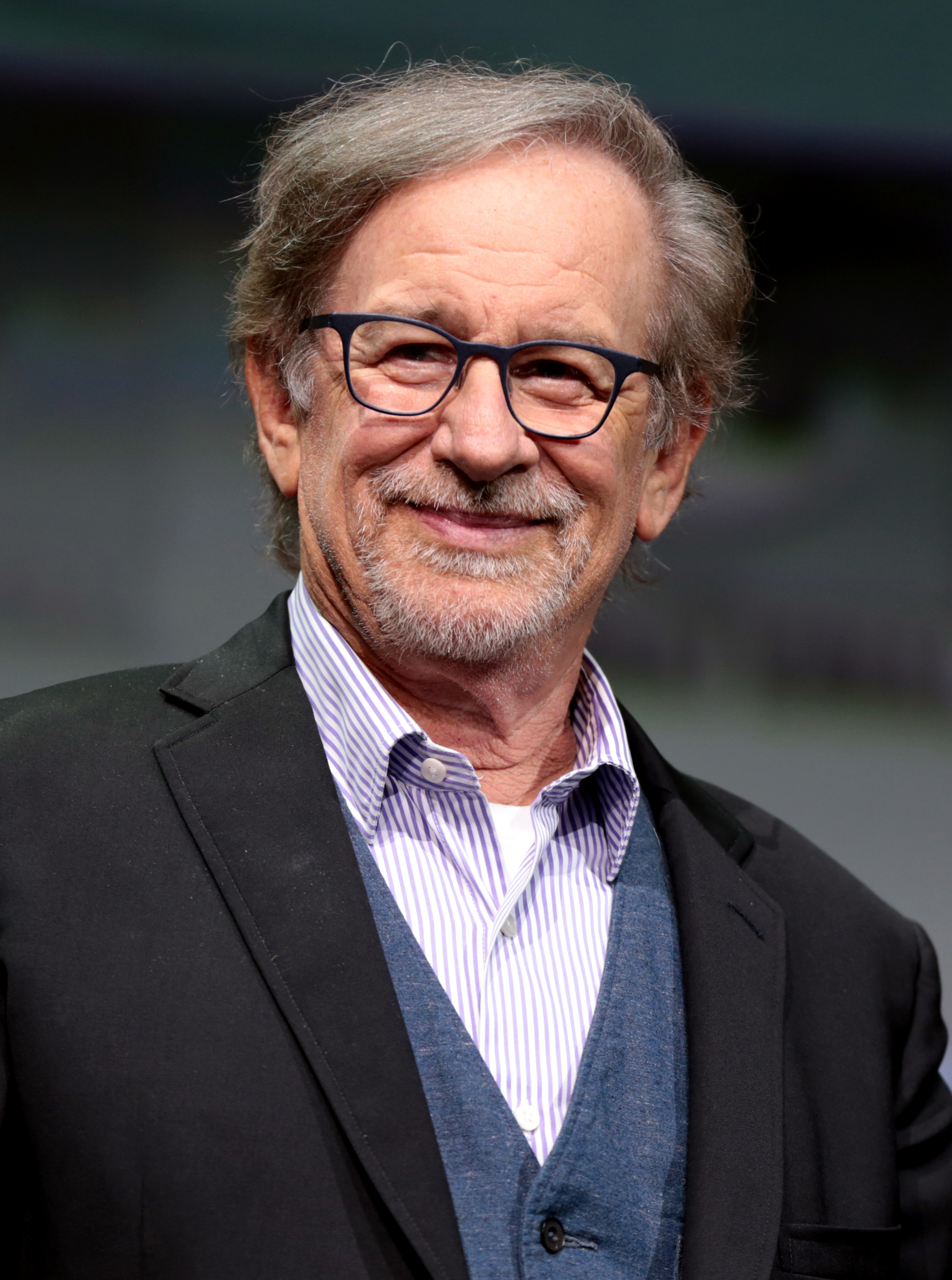
Steven Spielberg in 1986

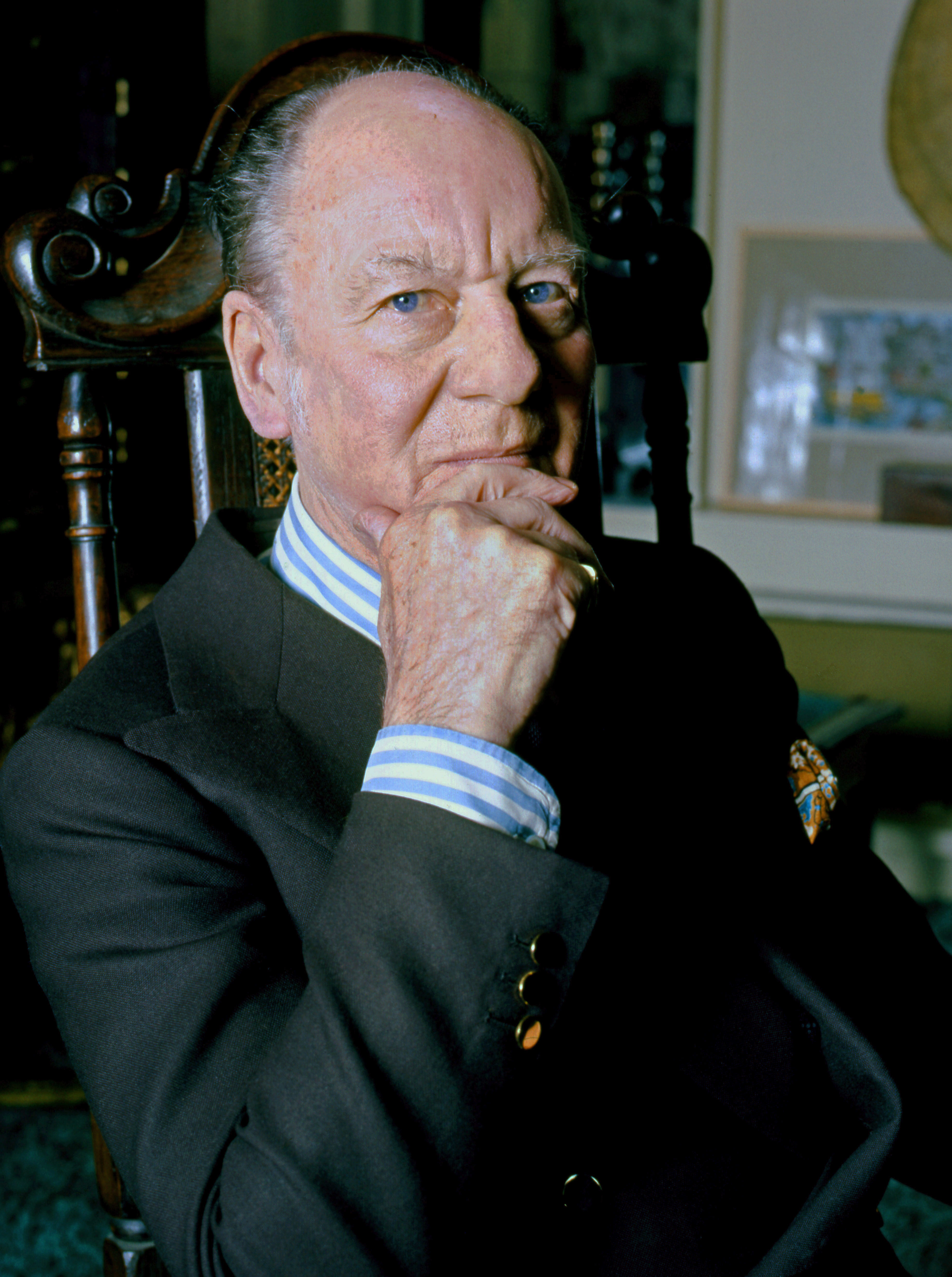
John Gielgud in 1992

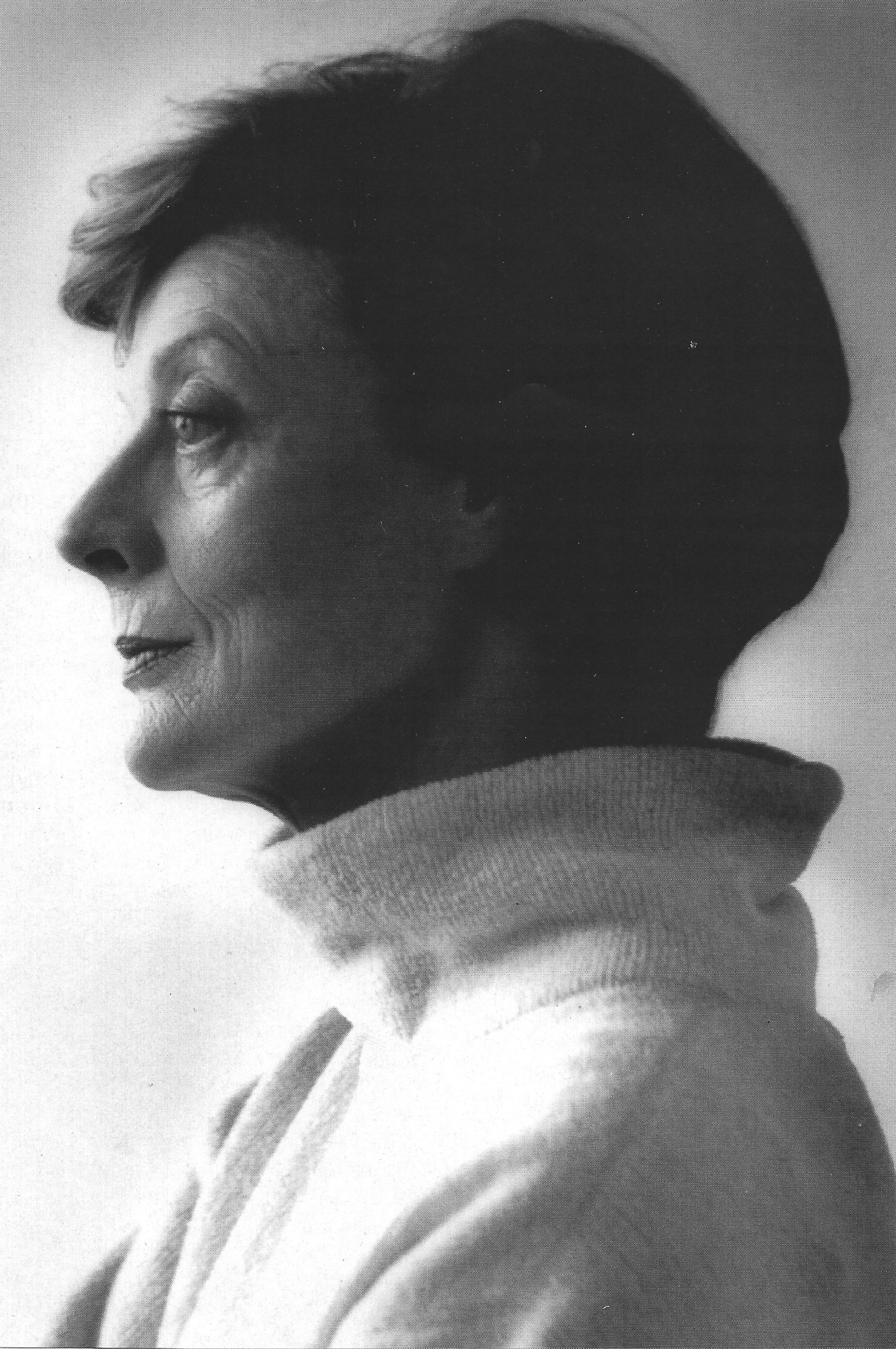
Dame Maggie Smith won in 1996.

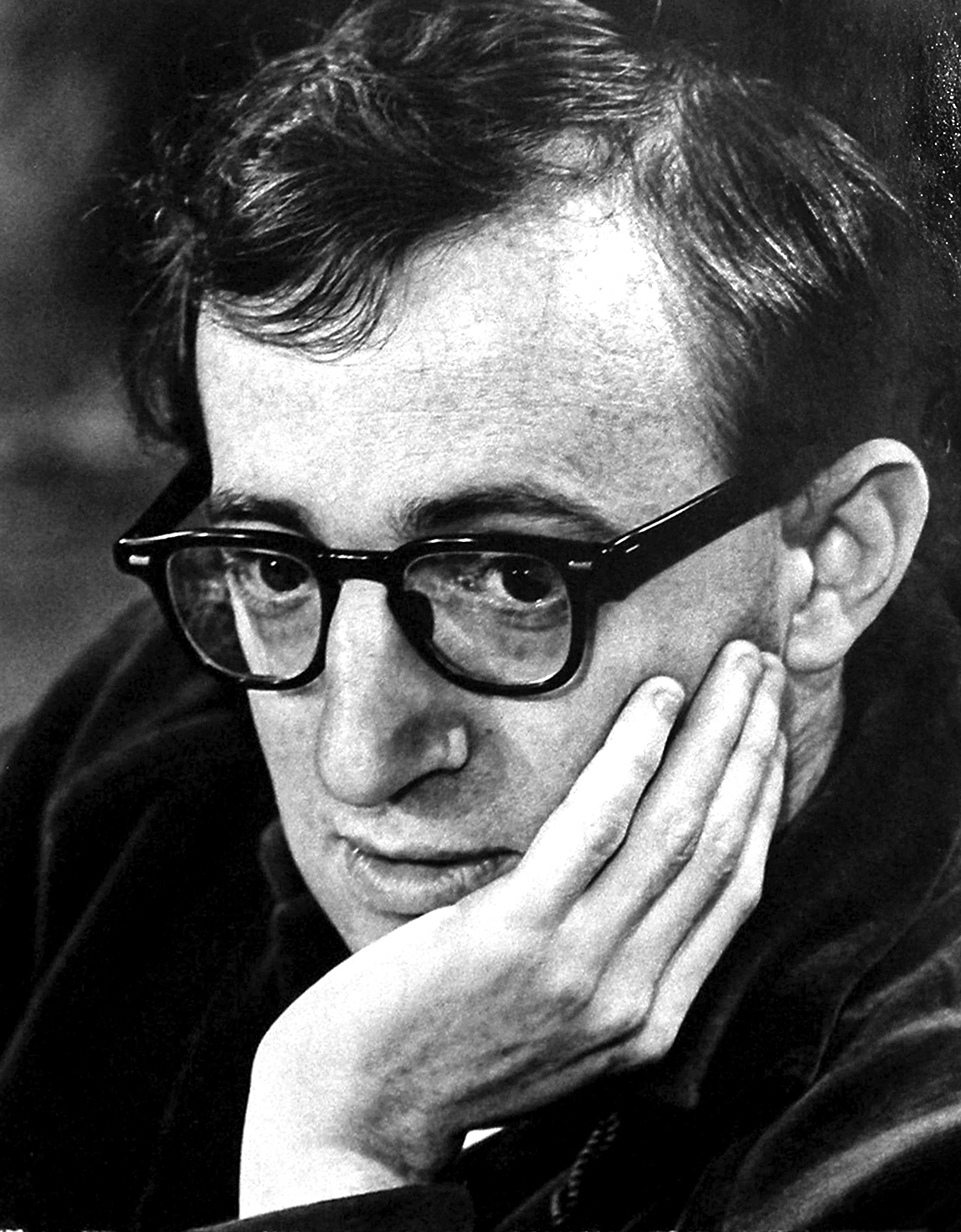
Woody Allen won in 1997.

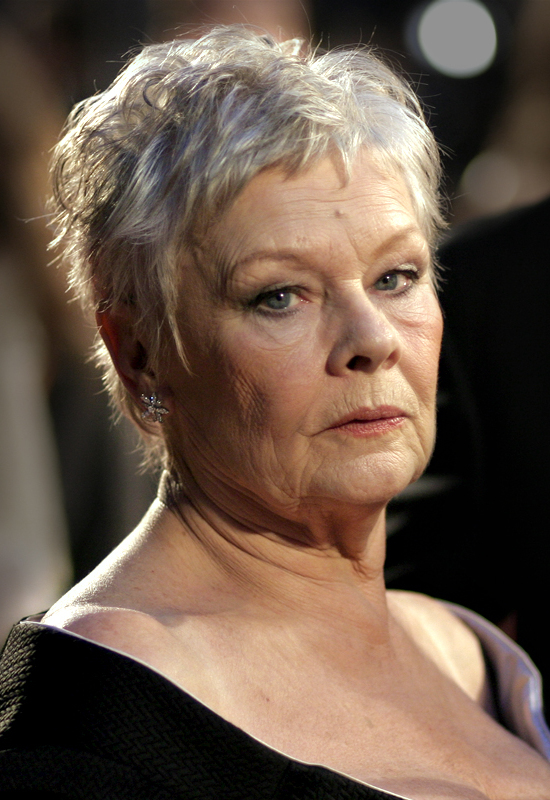
Judi Dench won in 2001.

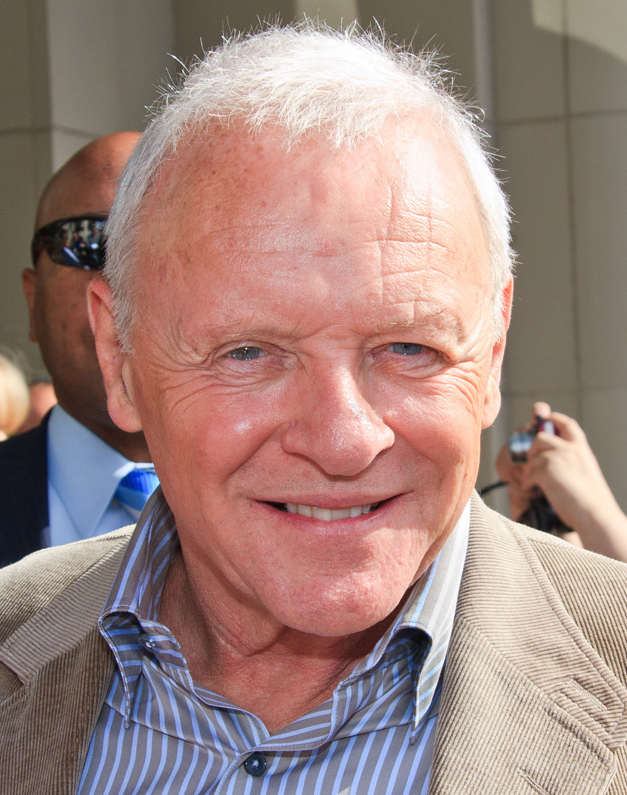
Anthony Hopkins won in 2008.

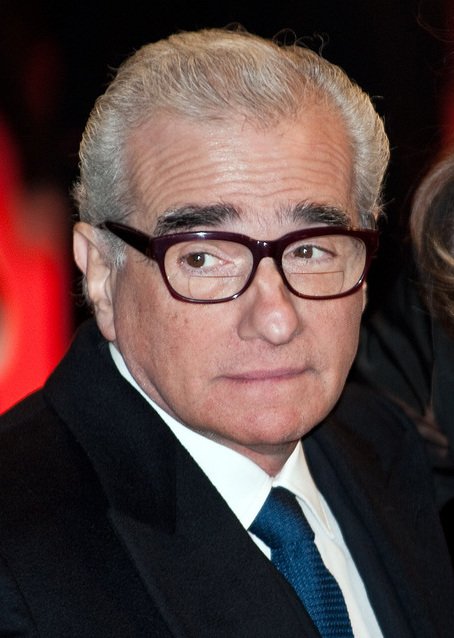
Martin Scorsese won in 2012.

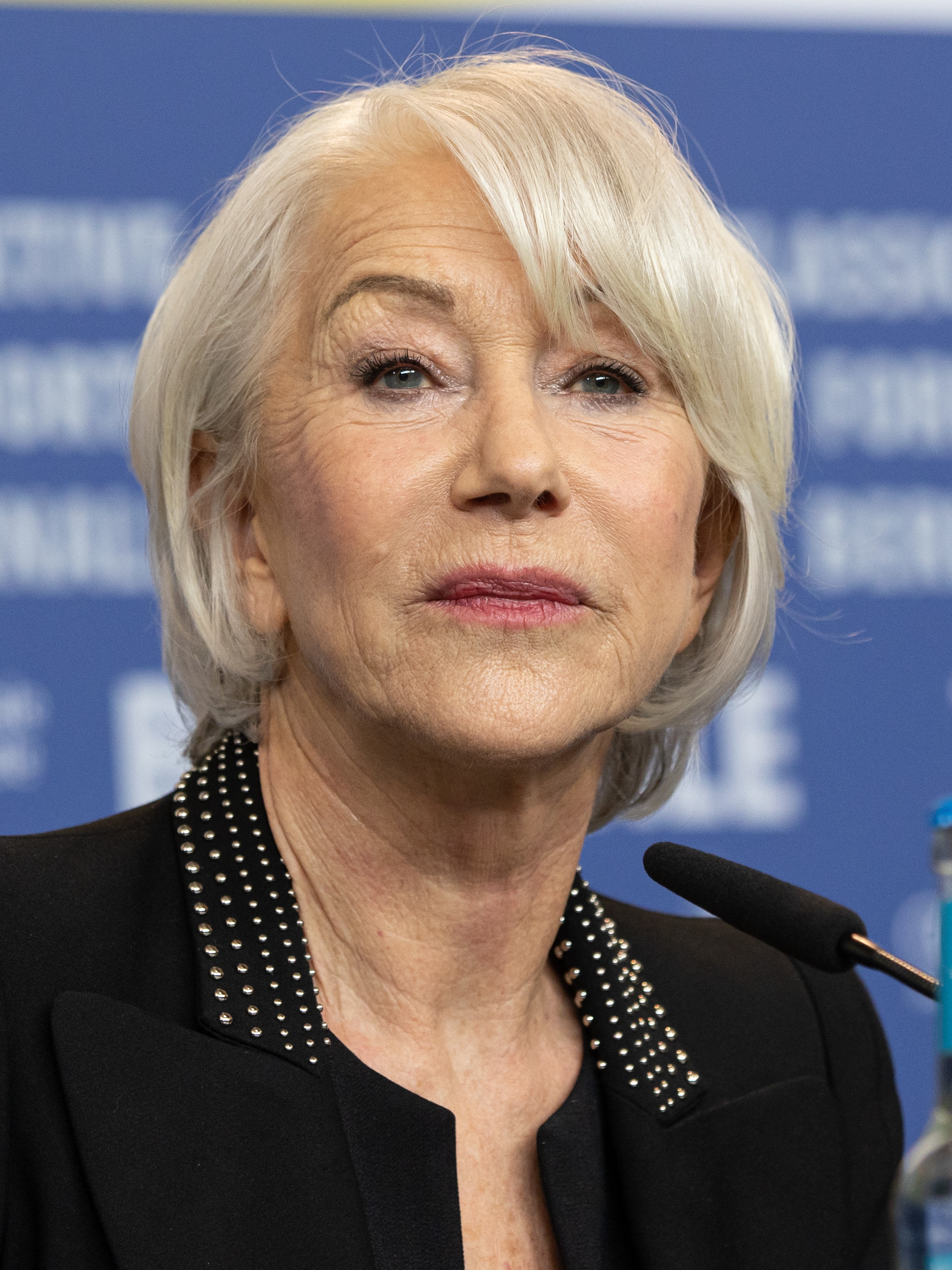
Helen Mirren won in 2014.

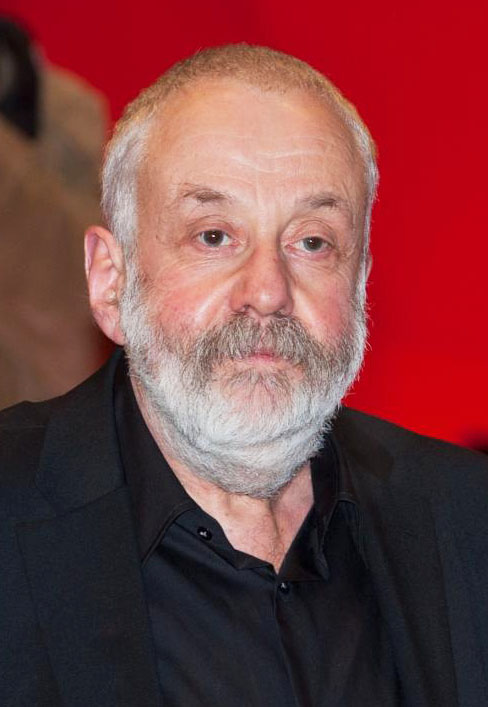
Mike Leigh won in 2015.

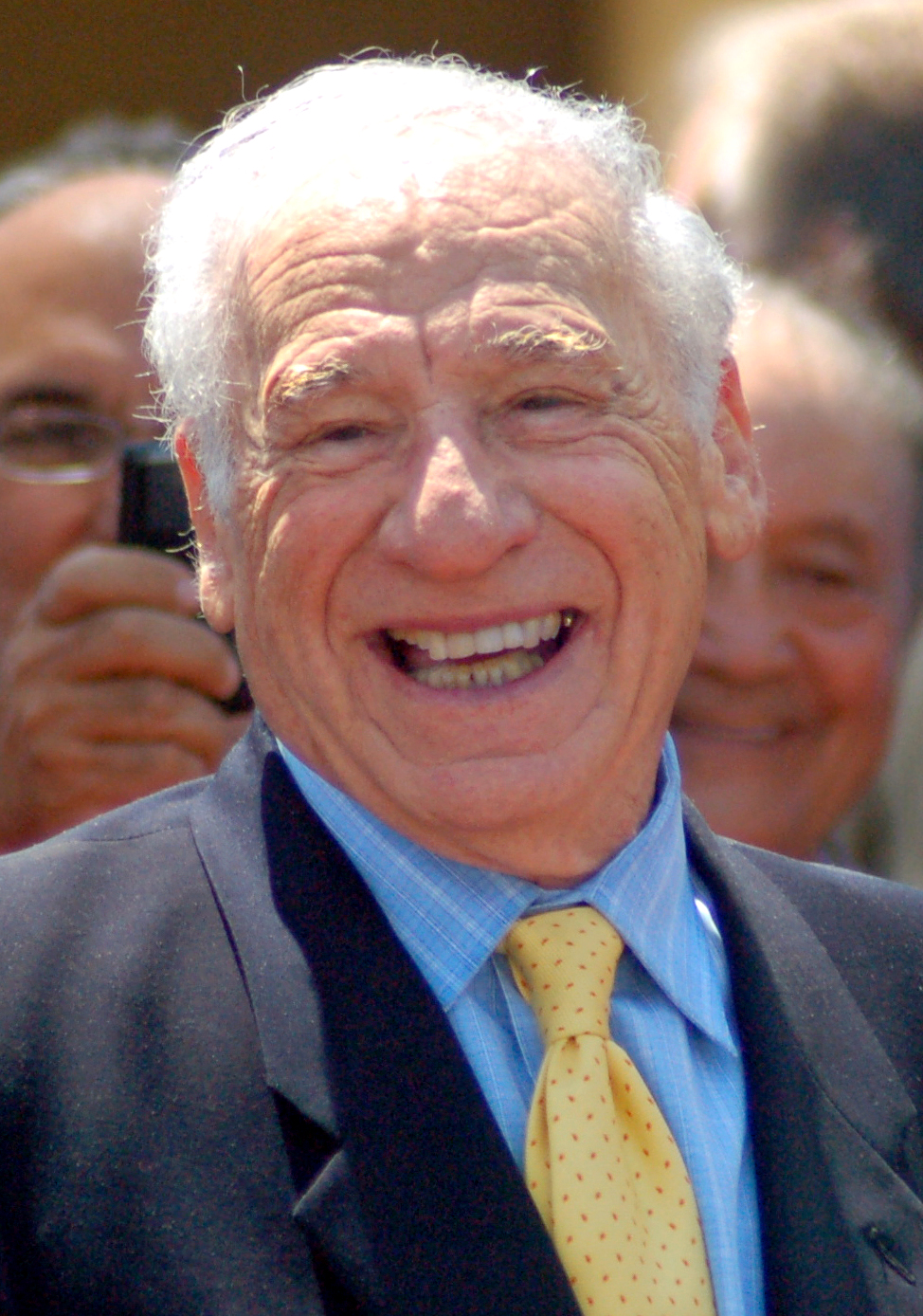
Mel Brooks won in 2017.

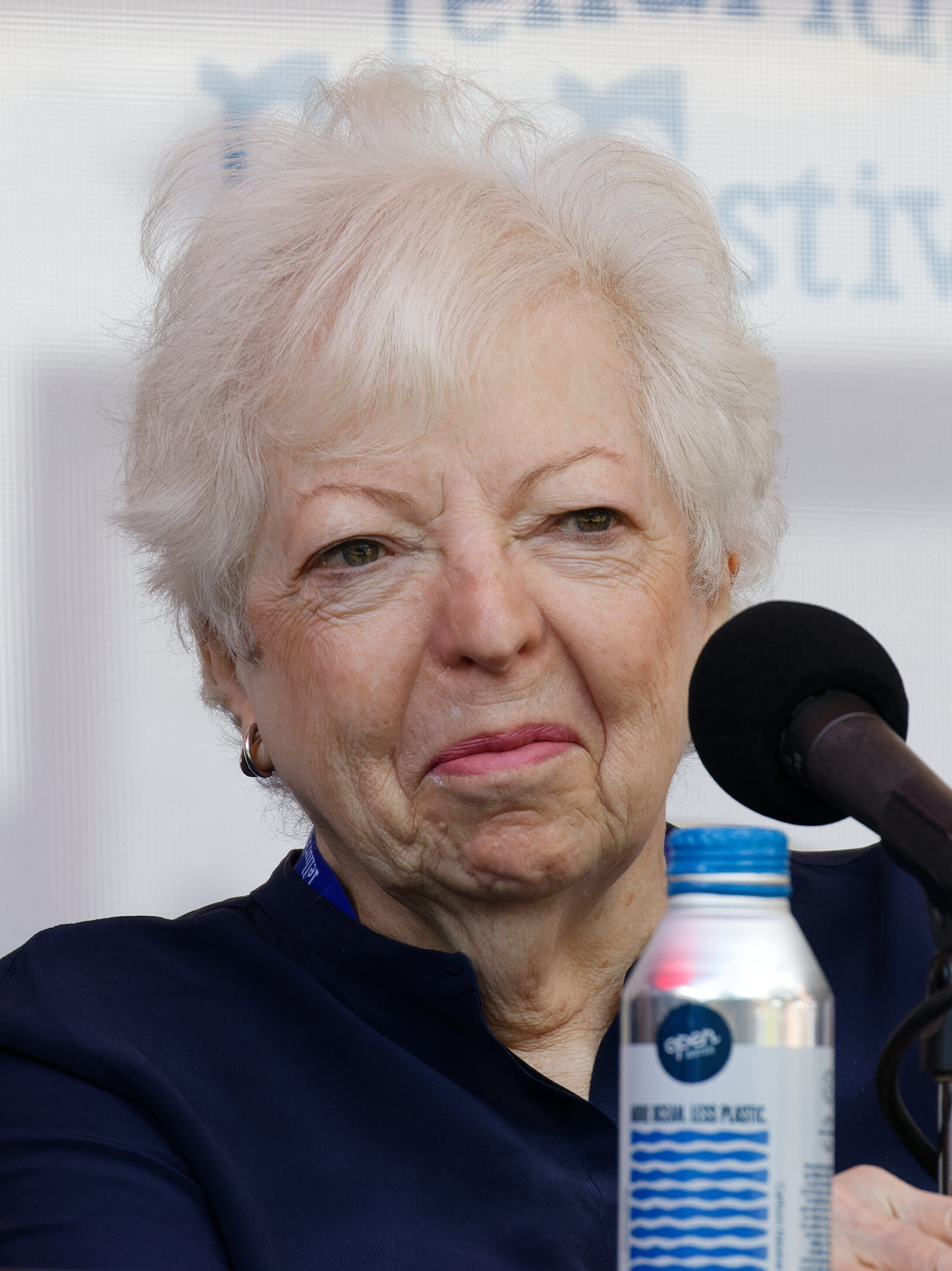
Thelma Schoonmaker won in 2019.

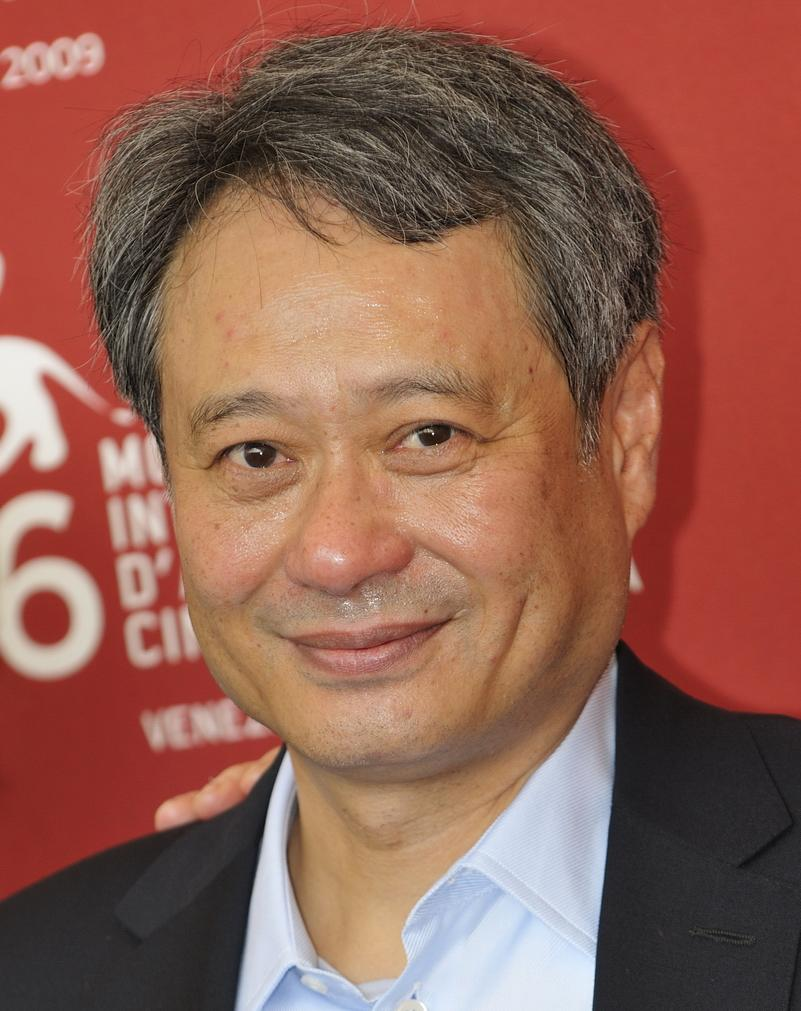
Ang Lee won 2021.

=== 1970s ===
Year	Recipient	Profession	Nationality	Ref.
1971	Alfred Hitchcock	Filmmaker and producer	United Kingdom	
1972	Freddie Young	Cinematographer	United Kingdom	
1973	Grace Wyndham Goldie	Producer	United Kingdom	
1974	David Lean	Filmmaker	United Kingdom	
1975	Jacques Cousteau	Explorer / filmmaker	France	
1976	Charlie Chaplin	Filmmaker / Actor	United Kingdom	
1976	Laurence Olivier	Filmmaker / Actor	United Kingdom	
1977	Denis Forman	Director (Note: then Chair of the British Film Institute and Granada Television)	United Kingdom	
1978	Fred Zinnemann	Filmmaker	United States	
1979	Lew Grade	Media proprietor	United Kingdom	
1979	Huw Wheldon	Broadcaster / executive	United Kingdom	

=== 1980s ===
Year	Recipient	Profession	Nationality	Ref.
1980	David Attenborough	Broadcaster / naturalist	United Kingdom	
1980	John Huston	Filmmaker / Actor	United States	
1981	Abel Gance	Filmmaker / producer	France	
1981	Michael Powell	Filmmaker (Note: member of Powell and Pressburger)	United Kingdom	
1981	Emeric Pressburger	Filmmaker (Note: member of Powell and Pressburger)	United Kingdom; Hungary	
1982	Andrzej Wajda	Filmmaker	Poland	
1983	Richard Attenborough	Filmmaker / Actor	United Kingdom	
1984	Hugh Greene	Journalist / television executive	United Kingdom	
1984	Sam Spiegel	Film producer	Austria	
1985	Jeremy Isaacs	Television producer / executive	United Kingdom	
1986	Steven Spielberg	Filmmaker / producer	United States	
1987	Federico Fellini	Filmmaker	Italy	
1988	Ingmar Bergman	Filmmaker	Sweden	
1989	Alec Guinness	Actor	United Kingdom	

=== 1990s ===
Year	Recipient	Profession	Nationality	Ref.
1990	Paul Fox	Television executive	United Kingdom	
1991	Louis Malle	Director	France	
1992	John Gielgud	Actor	United Kingdom	
1992	David Plowright	Executive / producer	United Kingdom	
1993	Sydney Samuelson	First British Film Commissioner	United Kingdom	
1993	Colin Young	Film educator (Note: First director of the National Film and Television School)	United States	
1994	Michael Grade	Broadcast executive	United Kingdom	
1995	Billy Wilder	Filmmaker	United States	
1996	Jeanne Moreau	Actress / Filmmaker	France	
1996	Ronald Neame	Cinematographer / Filmmaker	United Kingdom	
1996	John Schlesinger	Filmmaker director	United Kingdom	
1996	Maggie Smith	Actress	United Kingdom	
1997	Woody Allen	Filmmaker	United States	
1997	Steven Bochco	Producer / writer	United States	
1997	Julie Christie	Actress	United Kingdom	
1997	Oswald Morris	Cinematographer	United States	
1997	Harold Pinter	Writer	United Kingdom	
1997	David Rose	Songwriter / composer	United States	
1998	Sean Connery	Actor	United Kingdom	
1998	Bill Cotton	Producer / executive	United Kingdom	
1999	Eric Morecambe	Television Comedian (Note: member of Morecambe and Wise)	United Kingdom	
1999	Ernie Wise	Television Comedian (Note: member of Morecambe and Wise)	United Kingdom	
1999	Elizabeth Taylor	Actress	United Kingdom	

=== 2000s ===
Year	Recipient	Profession	Nationality	Ref.
2000	Michael Caine	Actor	United Kingdom	
2000	Stanley Kubrick	Filmmaker	United States	
2000	Peter Bazalgette	Media expert	United Kingdom	
2001	Albert Finney	Actor	United Kingdom	
2001	John Thaw	Actor	United Kingdom	
2001	Judi Dench	Actress	United Kingdom	
2002	Warren Beatty	Filmmaker / Actor	United States	
2002	Merchant Ivory Productions	Film Company (Note: Founded by director James Ivory and producer Ismail Merchant; First organisation to win the award)	—	
2002	Andrew Davies	Author / screenwriter	United Kingdom	
2002	John Mills	Actor	United Kingdom	
2003	Saul Zaentz	Film Producer	United States	
2003	David Jason	Television Actor	United Kingdom	
2004	John Boorman	Filmmaker	United Kingdom	
2004	Roger Graef	Filmmaker	United States	
2005	John Barry	Film Composer	United Kingdom	
2005	David Frost	Television presenter	United Kingdom	
2006	David Puttnam	Film Producer	United Kingdom	
2006	Ken Loach	Film / television director	United Kingdom	
2007	Anne V. Coates	Film editor	United Kingdom	
2007	Richard Curtis	Filmmaker	United Kingdom	
2007	Will Wright	Games Designer (Note: co-founder of Maxis)	United States	
2008	Anthony Hopkins	Actor	United Kingdom	
2008	Bruce Forsyth	Television presenter	United Kingdom	
2009	Dawn French	Television actress / comedian (Note: member of French and Saunders)	United Kingdom	
2009	Jennifer Saunders	Television actress / comedian (Note: member of French and Saunders)	United Kingdom	
2009	Terry Gilliam	Filmmaker / comedian (Note: member of Monty Python)	United Kingdom	
2009	Nolan Bushnell	Games Engineer (Note: founder of Atari, Inc.)	United States	

=== 2010s ===
Year	Recipient	Profession	Nationality	Ref.
2010	Vanessa Redgrave	Actress	United Kingdom	
2010	Shigeru Miyamoto	Games designer at Nintendo (Note: most notable for the Super Mario and The Legend of Zelda series)	Japan	
2010	Melvyn Bragg	Television broadcaster	United Kingdom	
2011	Christopher Lee	Actor	United Kingdom	
2011	Peter Molyneux	Games designer	United Kingdom	
2011	Trevor McDonald	Television presenter	United Kingdom; Trinidad and Tobago	
2012	Martin Scorsese	Filmmaker	United States	
2012	~~Rolf Harris~~ (rescinded) (Note: (Harris's Fellowship was annulled on 30 June 2014 following his criminal conviction))	~~Television presenter~~	Australia	
2013	Alan Parker	Filmmaker	United Kingdom	
2013	Gabe Newell	Games developer (Note: co-founder of Valve)	United States	
2013	Michael Palin	Actor / Comedian (Note: member of Monty Python)	United Kingdom	
2014	Helen Mirren	Actress	United Kingdom	
2014	Rockstar Games	Games developer and publisher (Note: most notable for the Grand Theft Auto series (accepted by Dan Houser, Sam Houser, Leslie Benzies, and Aaron Garbut))	—	
2014	Julie Walters	Actress	United Kingdom	
2015	Mike Leigh	Filmmaker	United Kingdom	
2015	David Braben	Games programmer and designer (Note: founder of Frontier Developments)	United Kingdom	
2015	Jon Snow	Television presenter	United Kingdom	
2016	Sidney Poitier	Actor	United States; Bahamas	
2016	John Carmack	Games programmer / Engineer (Note: co-founder of id Software)	United States	
2016	Ray Galton	Comedy writers	United Kingdom	
2016	Alan Simpson	Comedy writers	United Kingdom	
2017	Mel Brooks	Filmmaker / Actor / Comedian	United States	
2017	Joanna Lumley	Television actress	United Kingdom	
2018	Ridley Scott	Filmmaker	United Kingdom	
2018	Tim Schafer	Games designer (Note: founder of Double Fine)	United States	
2018	Kate Adie	Television journalist	United Kingdom	
2019	Thelma Schoonmaker	Film editor	United States	
2019	Joan Bakewell	Television broadcaster	United Kingdom	

=== 2020s ===
Year	Recipient	Profession	Nationality	Ref.
2020	Kathleen Kennedy	Producer (Note: president of Lucasfilm from 2012 to 2026)	United States	
2020	Hideo Kojima	Games designer (Note: most notable for the Metal Gear series, founder of Kojima Productions)	Japan	
2021	Siobhan Reddy	Games director (Note: Media Molecule since 2009)	United Kingdom	
2021	Ang Lee	Filmmaker	Taiwan	
2022	Billy Connolly	Television actor / comedian	United Kingdom	
2023	Sandy Powell	Costume designer	United Kingdom	
2023	Shuhei Yoshida	Games designer (Note: former president of Sony Interactive Entertainment)	Japan	
2023	Meera Syal	Television Actor / Writer	United Kingdom	
2024	Samantha Morton	Actress	United Kingdom	
2024	Floella Benjamin	Television presenter	United Kingdom	
2025	Warwick Davis	Actor	United Kingdom	
2025	Yoko Shimomura	Games composer	Japan	
2025	Kirsty Wark	Television presenter	United Kingdom	
2026	Donna Langley	Film executive (Note: Chairwoman of Universal Pictures)	United Kingdom	
2026	Ilkka Paananen	Video game executive (Note: CEO and co-founder of Supercell)	Finland	
2026	Mary Berry	Food writer, chef, baker and television presenter	United Kingdom	
2026	Duncan Kenworthy	Film and television producer	United Kingdom	
