= Stuart Hood =

British writer (1915–2011)

- Born: Stuart Clink Hood; 17 December 1915; Edzell, Angus, Scotland
- Died: 31 January 2011 (aged 95); Brighton and Hove, East Sussex, England
- Education: University of Edinburgh
- Title: Controller of BBC Television Service (1961–1963)

Stuart Clink Hood (17 December 1915 – 31 January 2011) was a Scottish novelist, translator and a former British television producer and Controller of BBC Television.

== Life ==
Hood was born in Edzell, Angus, Scotland. His father was an infant school headmaster, firstly in Edzell and then in Montrose. After school Hood attended the University of Edinburgh between 1934 and 1938.

During the Second World War Hood served in the British Army as an intelligence officer. He spent a year in Italy as a prisoner of war before joining the partisans. His memoir of this period, Pebbles from my Skull, was published in 1963; a revised version appeared in 1985. It is an unromantic account of the partisans in Italy and their relationship to the official allied forces.

From 1961 until 1963, Hood was the Controller of the BBC Television Service. As Controller, he played a key role in changing the BBC's reputation from being a producer of stodgy, didactic programming in the tradition of Lord Reith to a more creative broadcaster. His tenure saw the launch of innovative programming such as on the police drama Z-Cars, the satire That Was the Week That Was and the influential science fiction programme Doctor Who, as well as the appearance of the first female newscaster, Nan Winton. He became the overall Controller of BBC Television in 1963 with the preparations for the launch of the minority channel BBC2, with his former assistant Donald Baverstock working under him to Control BBC1 and Michael Peacock doing the same for the new channel. This arrangement was short-lived as he resigned from the BBC in the summer of 1964, although his subsequent period at Rediffusion London as Controller was also brief.

During the 1970s, he was Professor of Film and Television at the Royal College of Art, School of Film and Television.

He was active in the ACTT union and was a member of the Workers Revolutionary Party between 1973 and 1978. In his youth, he had been a member of the Young Communist League and then the Communist Party of Great Britain.

In 1988, he hosted an edition of After Dark called "What Do Women Want" and featuring among others James Dearden, Mary Whitehouse, Joan Wyndham, Naim Attallah and Shere Hite.

== Writings ==
Hood gained a reputation as a translator, beginning with Ernst Jünger's On the Marble Cliffs in 1946. He also translated Erich Fried, Aldo Busi, Dario Fo, Dino Buzzati, Goffredo Parise and Pier Paolo Pasolini.

His first book, The Circle of the Minotaur appeared in 1950. It contained two novels: The Circle of the Minotaur itself and The Fisherman's Daughter. It was followed by another novel, Since the Fall, in 1955.

Pebbles from My Skull, about the time he spent with partisans in war-time Italy, was published in 1963 (Hutchinson) and revised in 1985 (Carcanet).

He wrote several books that analyze and critique the broadcasting industry, including A Survey of Television (1967), The Mass Media (Studies in Contemporary Europe) (1972), Radio and Television (Professions) (1975), Questions of Broadcasting with Garret O'Leary (1990), Behind the Screens: The Structure of British Television (1994), and On Television with Thalia Tabary-Peterssen (1997). He also wrote some more novels, including A Storm From Paradise (1985), The Upper Hand (1987) and A Den of Foxes (1991).

Hood co-authored "Introducing the Holocaust" in the "Introducing..." book series with Haim Bresheeth released in 1997 and also translated the anti-Nazi German novelist Theodor Plievier's novel Moscow, which shows the 1941 Battle of Moscow from both German and Soviet perspectives.

Media offices
Preceded by Kenneth Adam	Controller of BBC Television Service; 1961–1963	Succeeded by Donald Baverstock
