= Skiboy =

1974 British television series

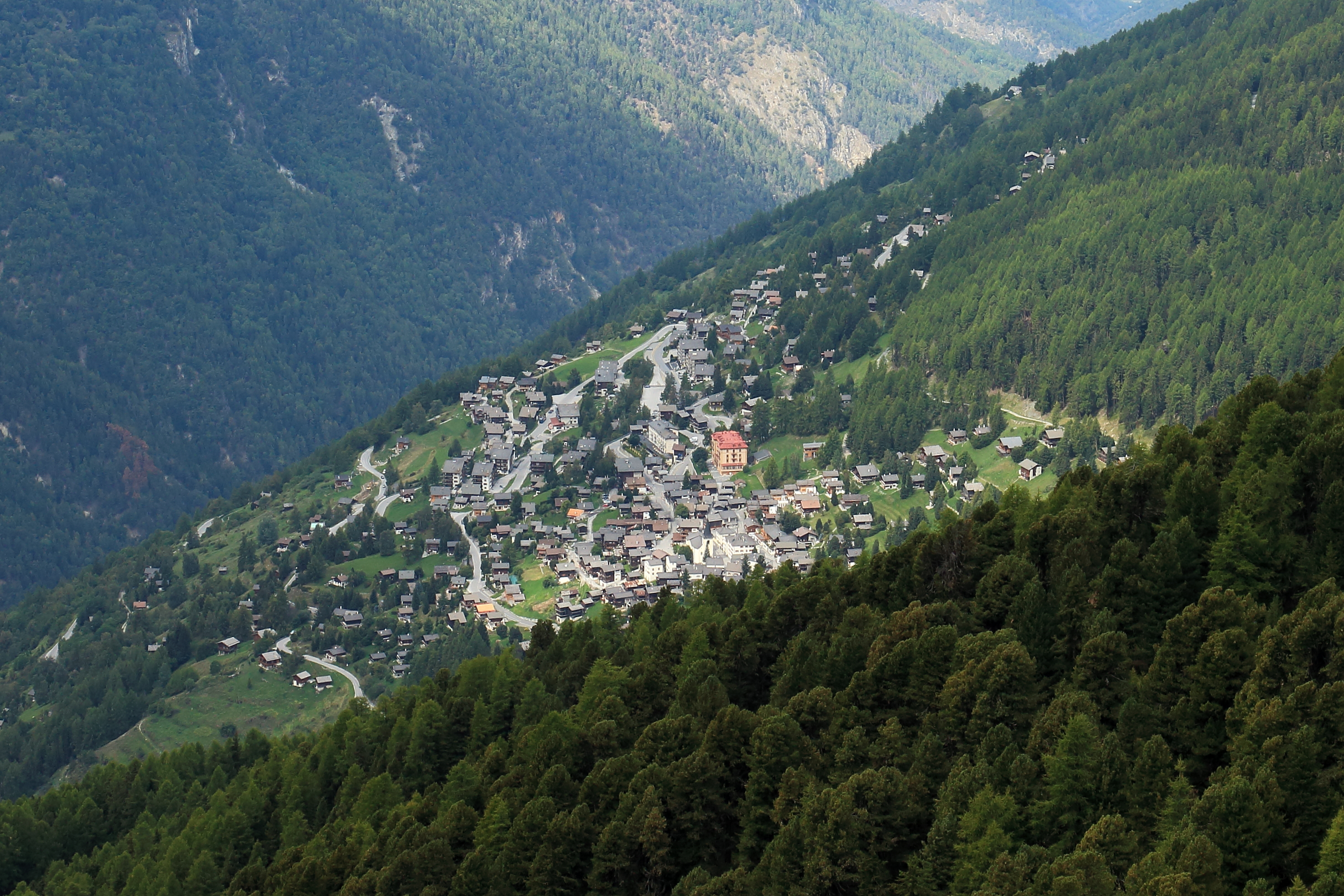
- The village of Saint-Luc, where the whole series was filmed.
- Also known as: Ski-Boy; Ski Boy; Á Skis Redoublés; Genç Kayakçi
- Genre: Action/Drama
- Created by: Derrick Sherwin; Charles de Jaeger
- Directed by: Anthony Squire; Michael Ferguson; Martin Hall
- Starring: Stephen R. Hudis; Margot Alexis; Robert Coleby; Frederick Jaeger; Patricia Haines
- Theme music composer: Anthony Isaac
- Country of origin: United Kingdom
- Original language: English
- No. of series: 1
- No. of episodes: 13

Production
- Executive producers: Derrick Sherwin; Charles de Jaeger
- Producers: Derrick Sherwin; Lew Grade
- Camera setup: Multi-Camera
- Running time: 23 minutes; (except for the pilot episode)
- Production company: ITC Entertainment

Original release
- Network: ITV
- Release: May 13 – August 5, 1974

Skiboy is a British action television series produced and created by Derrick Sherwin and Charles de Jaeger. The series ran for 13 episodes from 13 May 1974 to 5 August 1974 on ITV before being cancelled. The entire series was filmed at the mountainous location of Saint-Luc in Switzerland, where the plots for the episodes mostly center around dramatic events in the mountains.

== Origins ==
During the 1960s and 70s, ITC Entertainment was responsible for producing ITV's numerous television series with plots concerning fantasy, science-fiction, and action. At the beginning of 1973, Derrick Sherwin, with the help of Dennis Spooner, developed an idea based on action and skiing, which was starting to become an extremely popular sport at this time. As for finding a location to film, Charles de Jaeger proposed to Sherwin that the ideal place would be in one of the most traditional villages of the Val d'Anniviers, in Saint-Luc. After having filmed the series successfully in the mountainous region in the winter of 1973–74, the double-length pilot episode, "Mountain Witch" was released on 13 May 1974.

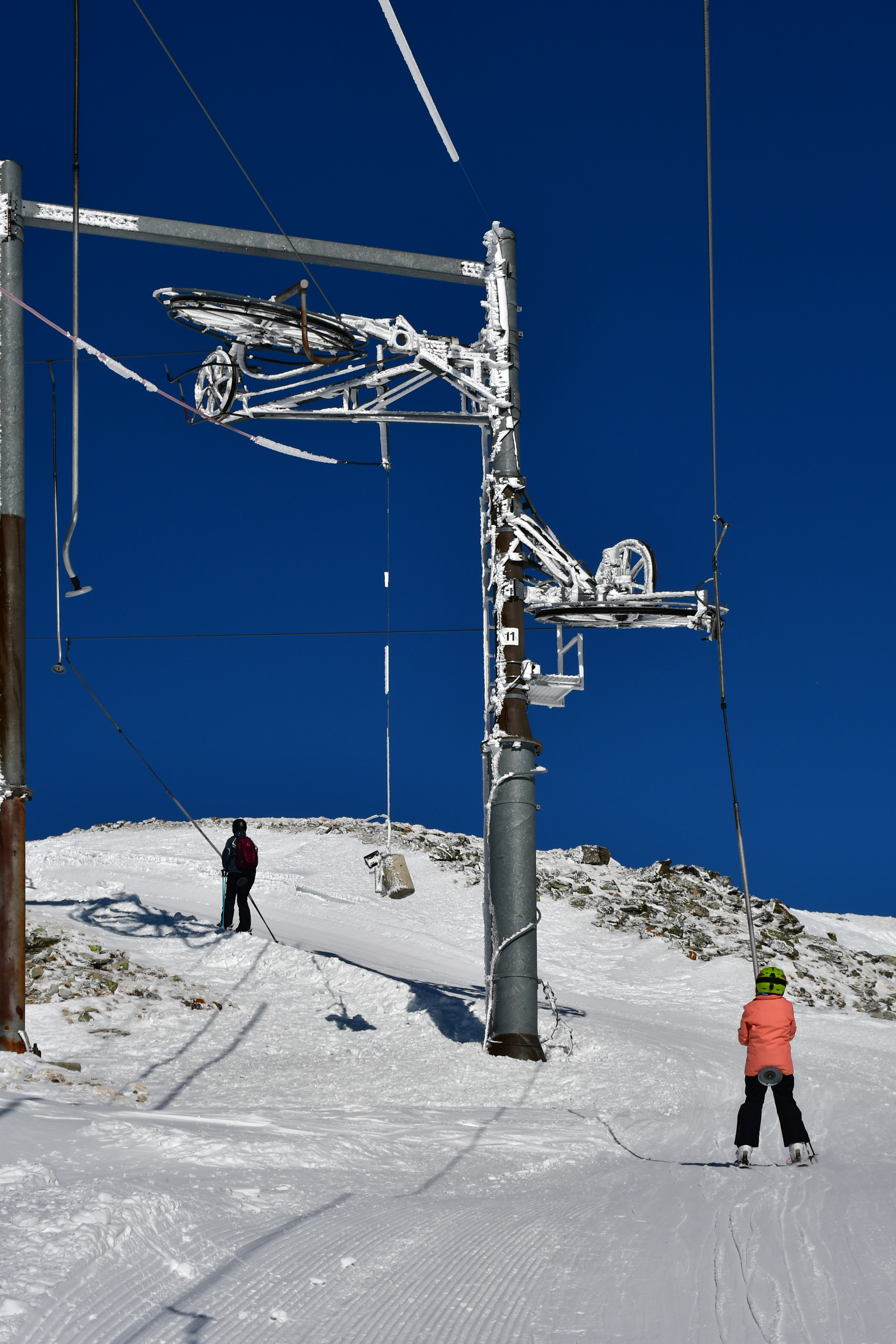
Many episodes of the series were filmed near Bella-Tola, where now exists a skilift by the same name.

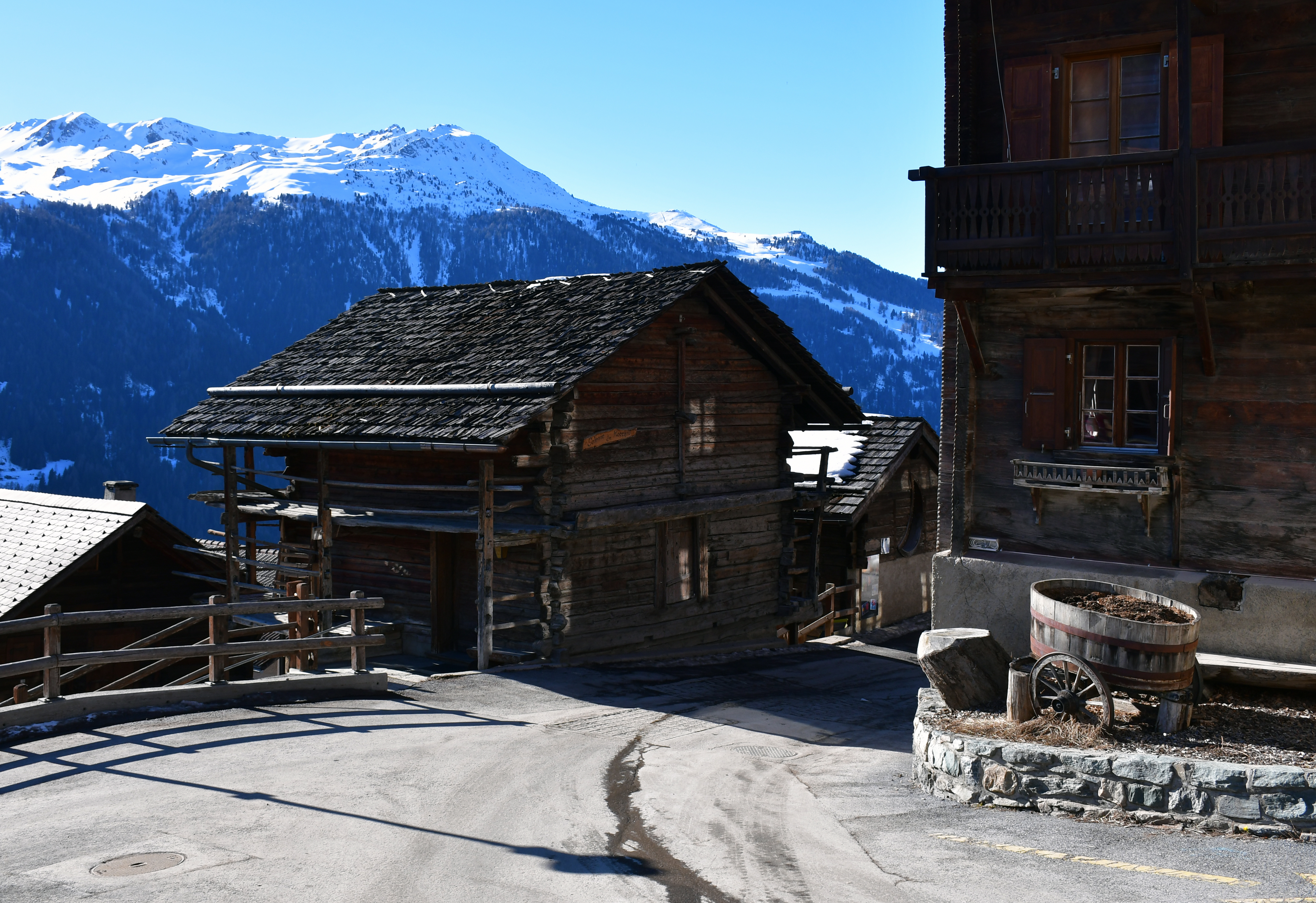
Bobbie and Sadie are seen in the village of Saint-Luc many times throughout the series.

== Characters ==
=== Bobbie Noel ===
Played by Stephen R. Hudis. Bobbie is the youngest son of the Noel family that resides in the mountains. His parents are owner of a hotel in his alpine hometown, and his brother, Jean, is part of the mountain rescue team. He is mostly followed by his girlfriend, Sadie (played by Margot Alexis), that also enjoys skiing, and his faithful dog, Gruff. In the series, he is regarded as being the main character, which he is called Skiboy, and comes to the rescue in dangerous situations with his amazing skiing skills. His dream is to become an olympic skier, thereby, using Saint-Luc as practice, with the help of Jean. Bobbie is mostly seen wearing his yellow and black winter clothes.

==== Gruff ====
Gruff is a Lakeland Terrier that accompanies Bobbie everywhere he goes in the village.

=== Sadie McStay ===
Played by Margot Alexis. Sadie is Bobbie's girlfriend that resides with his family and friends at Saint-Luc. In the episodes, she is mostly seen skiing with him on the slopes.

=== Jean Noel ===
Played by Robert Coleby. Jean is Bobbie's older brother and is part of the mountain rescue team of Saint-Luc and is sometimes on duty at the hotel restaurant. When Bobbie is faced into hard situations, Jean is normally there to help Bobbie by bringing him tools, or even helping the pursuit of some bandits on the slopes.

=== Jacques Noel ===
Played by Frederick Jaeger. Jacques is Bobbie's uncle, and owner of the hotel. He is not seen on many episodes, but when seen, is helping Bobbie. In the episode Buried Menace, he relays by radio, instructions on how to de-fuse a recently discovered bomb to Bobbie from an arms expert.

=== Jane Noel ===
Played by Patricia Haines (although played by Pauline Challoner in the episode Cold Shoulder). Jane is wife of the hotel owner, Jacques, and mostly helps prepare meals for the inhabitants of the building. She also approves a hatred relationship between Bobbie's dog, Gruff. In some other versions of the show, she is referred to as "Claire".

== Episodes ==
=== Plots ===
The plots of Skiboy depict dramatic events in a small alpine town. Bandits seeking hidden treasures in the mountains attract Bobbie's curiosity, or mysterious things happen in the village or on the mountain faces. And rarely, might there be some romance that is cut unexpectedly by danger.

=== Series One Episode List ===
Skiboy Episodes
No.	Title	Directed by	Written by	Original release date	Prod. code
1	"Mountain Witch"	Michael Ferguson	Derrick Sherwin	May 13, 1974	101
Bobbie Noel and Sadie McStay live in the mountainous region of Saint-Luc in his uncle's hotel. Life in this location has permitted them to become excellent skiers. One day, an old lady with a sick little boy is discovered by the two young people. The woman tells them she had just been rejected from Bobbie's hotel by Bruno the concierge, claiming she is an evil witch. Bobbie starts to learn the origins of the lady, called the "Mountain Witch" by villagers. Guest star: Anita Sharp-Bolster as Mountain Witch
2	"Cry Wolf"	Michael Ferguson	Bob Baker & Dave Martin	May 20, 1974	102
While skiing on the slopes of Saint-Luc, Sadie has a terrible fall and is badly injured. Bobbie rushes to get help, but when he comes back to reassure her, Sadie is gone. Bobbie has to figure out what happened to her. Guest star: Paul Maxwell as Mr.McStay
3	"Cold Shoulder"	Michael Ferguson	Bob Baker & Dave Martin	May 27, 1974	103
Romance is on the ski runs of Bobbie's village when two tourists meet. But the relationship between them becomes snowbound when they are stuck in the mountains. Bobbie is here to help them. Guest stars: John Clive as Alastair & Jeremy Bulloch as Jeremy
4	"Family Feud"	Anthony Squire	Dennis Spooner	June 3, 1974	104
Jacques is having problems with two villagers, who have had a prolonged quarrel on an incident that has happened many years ago. Sabotage is one of the claimed accusations. To solve the problem, they decide to enter a ski competition, forgetting that their youths have disappeared...
5	"Buried Menace"	Anthony Squire	Bob Baker & Dave Martin	June 10, 1974	105
An accident happens on the mountain as Bobbie and Sadie witness the fall of a filmmaker in a hole, where a bomb falls on him. The Noel Family sends a rescue operation, while a journalist goes illegally on the site to take pictures. After numerous attempts, Bobbie is forced to defuse the bomb. Guest stars: Michael Culver as Charles & Ingrid Pitt as Jo
6	"Vanishing Trick"	Anthony Squire	Tony Williamson	June 17, 1974	106
Bobbie tries to rescue Sadie, who has been kidnapped by some unwanted bandits on the slopes of Saint-Luc.
7	"Danger Trail"	Michael Ferguson	Tony Williamson	June 24, 1974	107
On a snowy day in the slopes, Bobbie and Sadie start to get stuck in an enormous snowstorm. They finally stop and try to await the storm to be finished. But while taking refuge, they hear a mysterious voice from behind that makes them want to push their investigations farther. This proves to be not a so good idea after all. Guest star: Paul Maxwell as Mr.McStay
8	"Hot Ice"	Anthony Squire	Derrick Sherwin	July 1, 1974	108
Jane and Jean are approached by two men who want to be taken up Monk's Fall, a mountain close to Saint-Luc, but are declined by the two people. To find a guide, they dognap Gruff, Bobbie's dog, in exchange to be taken up the mountain. Bobbie accepts to guide them, but he discovers that the two bandits did not follow their promise... Guest star: Hans Meyer as Reiner
9	"Killer Dog"	Anthony Squire	Derrick Sherwin	July 8, 1974	109
Gruff is convicted of having killed six sheep in Saint-Luc. His family keeps persuading the village it's not him, but the dog is forced out of Saint-Luc on a car, driven by Bobbie. But finally, they discover the real truth, and are on the chase to catch the real theft.
10	"Unwelcome Guest"	Martin Hall	Bob Baker & Dave Martin	July 15, 1974	110
Two villagers are accusing each other of being the theft of an old stolen item. Bobbie tries to solve the problem, and see who of the two is right. Guest star: Anouska Hempel as Michelle
11	"Death Mountain"	Michael Ferguson	Dennis Spooner	July 22, 1974	111
A famous female climber, Francoise Debra, just has accepted to climb Saint-Luc's highest peak by one of her friends, Phillip. But this decision worries her valet, Henri, who pleas her not to go. The valet forces himself to ask Jean Noel to help him persuade the climber not to climb the mountain. After a long discussion, the climber forgets her idea. But, sadly, it comes back to her mind and is decided to start climbing. Guest star: Sally Geeson as Francoise Debra
12	"Treasure Trove"	Michael Ferguson	Bob Baker & Dave Martin	July 29, 1974	112
While playing a friendly game in the snow, Bobbie tumbles over a pack of gold coins, which someone quickly comes to claim them. The stranger, Mathieu, also a hotel employee, claims it belongs to his dead father. But, Jacques, highly suspicious of the situation, proposes to donate it to church instead. This decision turns out into a big argument between the stranger and Jacques.
13	"Breaking Point" "Friday's Child"	Michael Ferguson	Jeremy Paul	August 5, 1974	113
Bobbie is uncomfortable watching her aunt talk to a newcomer. His family teases him, saying he is merely jealous, which proves to be true. But later, he discovers that the newcomer is a man searching for Sadie's widowed mother. Then he discovers another hardbreaking truth, one that says that Sadie's mother is usingthe newcomer to lure the girl out of Bobbie's family-friend relation. Bobbie must try to stop the scheme her friend's mother is making, and try to find out why. Guest star: Barbara Shelley as Mrs.Mc Stay

== Production & Reception ==
=== Episode Production ===
The episodes were filmed during the winter of 1973–74 at Saint-Luc in Switzerland, but were produced when the filming team got back to the United Kingdom. The first episode was broadcast on ITV on 13 May 1974, and the last one was aired on 5 August of that year. The filming team apparently had technical difficulties filming properly, and the people of Saint-Luc actually helped out the team.

==== Production Team ====
Production Team
Executive Producers	Directors	Producers	Writers	Adaptations	Shootings	Sound Recordings
Derrick Sherwin; Charles de Jaeger; Bruce Sharman	Anthony Squire; Martin Hall; Michael Ferguson	Derrick Sherwin; Lew Grade	Bob Baker; Dave Martin; Tony Williamson; Jeremy Paul; Dennis Spooner; Derrick Sherwin	Martin Hall	Tony Leggo; Jean Elissade	Ivan Sharp
Music composers	Production Directors	Sets	Assistant Producer	Costumes	Make-up	Mounting
Anthony Isaac	Robert Simmonds; Thomas Bransten	Christopher Cook	Dickie Bamber	Richard Pointing	Victoria Morgan	Thimothy Gee; Alan Strachan

This information comes from the end-credits of one of the available episodes on YouTube.

=== Audience Reception ===
The show was rated poorly by the English audience, but was rated pretty successful in other countries. The exact Nielsen rating of the television show remains unknown to this date.

== Foreign Versions ==
Skiboy was translated into a variety of languages, including Spanish, French, Italian, Turkish, and Japanese. In those countries, the program was more successful than it was in the United Kingdom.

=== France ===
In France, the show was called Á Skis Redoublés. The series aired in 1980 on FR3.

=== Spain ===
In Spain, it was called El esquiador. The series aired originally in 1975 on Televisión Española.

=== Italy ===
In Italy, it was called Ski Boy. The series aired originally in 1983 on an unknown channel.

=== Turkey ===
In Turkey, the series was named Genç Kayakçi. The series' air date and channel of diffusion remains unknown to this date.

=== Japan ===
In Japan, the film was broadcast under the name アルプスのスキーボーイ (literally, 'Ski Boy in the Alps' ) by NHK from 25 November to 18 December 1974 in a slot 少年ドラマシリーズ (literally, 'Drama series for adolescent').
