= Hudis =

Hudis is a surname. Notable people with the surname include:

- Mark Hudis (born 1968), American television writer and producer
- Norman Hudis (1922–2016), English film, theatre, and television writer
- Stephen R. Hudis (born 1957), American actor and stunt coordinator
