= Vic Tablian =

Armenian-British actor (born 1937)

- Born: Varoujan Aintablian; 10 October 1937 (age 89); Jerusalem, Mandatory Palestine
- Occupation: Actor
- Known for: Raiders of the Lost Ark

Varoujan Aintablian (born 10 October 1937), known professionally as Vic Tablian, is an Armenian-British actor, known for the Indiana Jones movie Raiders of the Lost Ark in 1981, in which he played both the treacherous Peruvian guide and later in the film as the Nazi collaborating "Monkey Man".

== Biography ==
Vic Tablian was born in Jerusalem. He is the son of Armenian genocide survivors.

In 1948, his family moved to Cyprus. In 1962, he relocated to the United Kingdom.

In 1992, Tablian appeared in the Indiana Jones franchise, playing Demetrios in the first episode of The Young Indiana Jones Chronicles. He also played in Midnight Express (1978), Navy Seals (1990), Sphinx (1981), Eleni (1985) and The Bill (2007). The Promise (2016) dedicated to the Armenian Genocide was the last movie he played in. His role in "The Promise" was the Cattle Car Old Man.

== Filmography ==
Year	Title	Role	Notes
1974	Murder on the Orient Express	Hawker	Uncredited
1975	Doctor Who	Ahmed	Serial: Pyramids of Mars
1976	The Message	Hamzu Army Soldier	Uncredited
1977	BBC2 Play of the Week	Egyptian Doctor	
1978	Midnight Express	Star	
1978	Sexton Blake and the Demon God	Zigiana's Uncle	Miniseries
1979	Dick Barton: Special Agent	Foreign Seaman	Episode: Adventure Three
1979	ITV Playhouse	Yorkos	Episode: The Reaper
1980	The Assassination Run	Costain	
1980	The Professionals	Room Service Waiter	Episode: Hijack
1981	Sphinx	Khalifa	
1981	The Monster Club	Dealer	Uncredited
1981	Tales of the Unexpected	Arab Officer	Episode: Would You Believe It?
1981	Raiders of the Lost Ark	Barranca / Monkey Man	
1982	Yes Minister	Prince Mohammed	Episode: The Moral Dimension
1983	Trenchcoat	Achmed	
1983	Reilly: Ace of Spies	Firsig	Miniseries
1983	Auf Wiedersehen, Pet	Ayotollah	Episode: If I Were a Carpenter
1984	Sakharov		TV movie
1985-1986	EastEnders	Mustapha	3 episodes
1985	Eleni	Guerrilla	
1988	Rockliffe's Babies	Mr. Aydin	Episode: Hearts and Flowers
1990	Navy Seals	Terrorist	
1992	The Young Indiana Jones Chronicles	Demetrios / Claw	Episode: The Curse of the Jackal
1996	Hard Men	Turkish Café Owner	
1999	The Knock	Issat Assan	2 episodes
2000	The Adventures of Young Indiana Jones: My First Adventure	Demetrios / Claw	TV movie
2001	South Kensington	Mobarak	
2002	Believe Nothing	Boutros Boutros-Ghali	Episode: Get Rich Quick
2003	Between Iraq and a Hard Place	Iraqi Official	TV movie
2003	Twelfth Night, or What You Will	Captain	TV movie
2003	Blind Flight	Storeroom - Senior Cleric	
2007	The Bill	Nadim Mura	2 episodes
2016	The Promise	Cattle Car Old Man	
