= Green Hedges =

Coordinates: 51°36′57″N 0°38′48″W

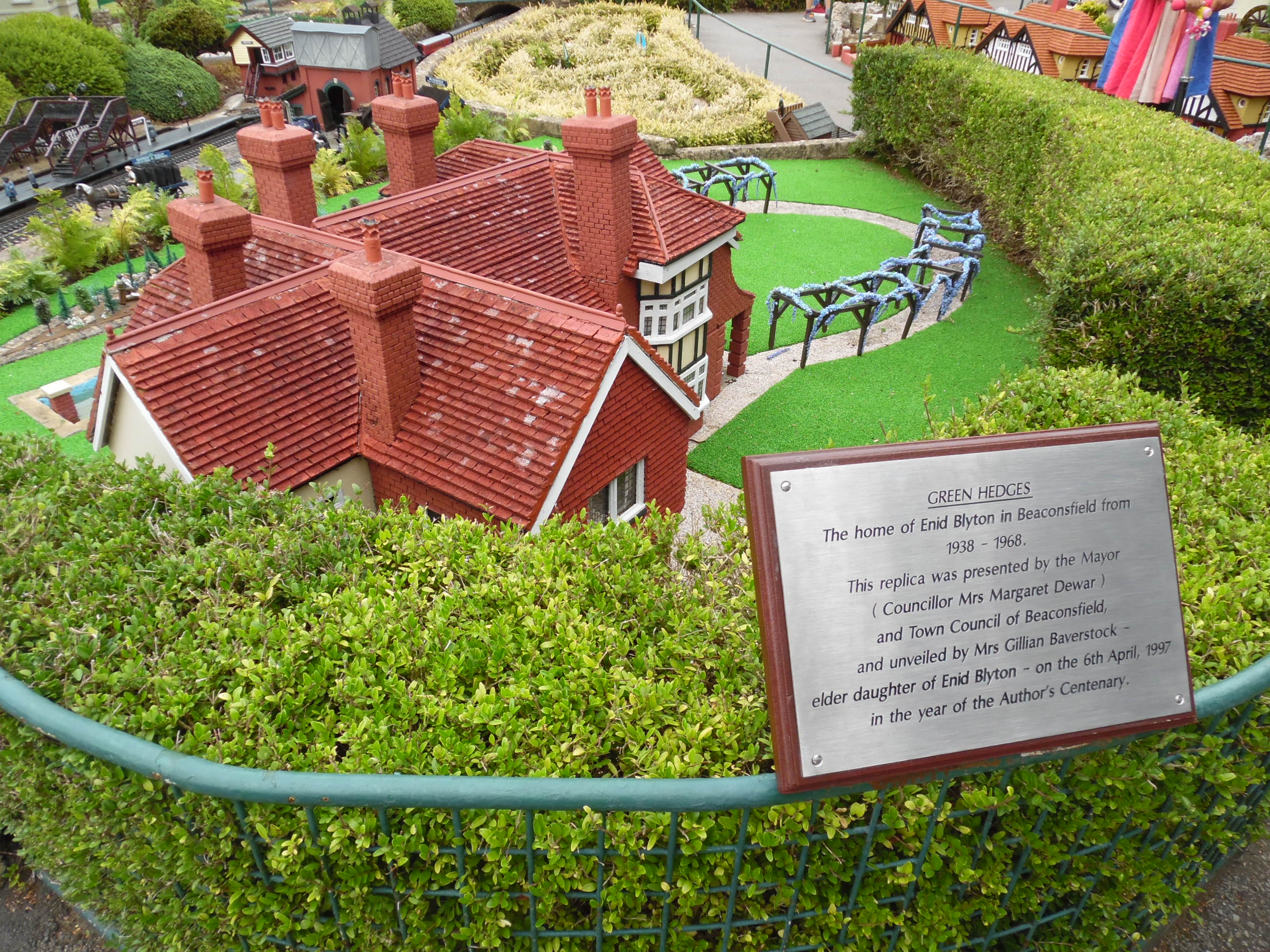
A model of the house at the local Bekonscot model village

Green Hedges was a large house situated off Penn Road in Beaconsfield, Buckinghamshire. It was the home of Enid Blyton from 1938 until shortly before her death. She wrote most of her books there, and it was the location of her famous Story Parties.

== History ==
In 1938, Enid Blyton and her first husband Hugh Alexander Pollock moved to the eight-bedroomed, mock-Tudor mansion where she would live for the rest of her life. There were large lawns, tennis courts, and a rose garden. There was also a large porch at the side.

== After ==
After Blyton's death, the house was knocked down and new houses were built in its place. A road named Blyton Close stands approximately within the former plot of the house and gardens.
