= Charles de Jaeger =

British cameraman (1911–2000)

- Born: 27 February 1911; Vienna, Austria
- Died: 19 May 2000 (aged 89); London, England
- Known for: Spaghetti-tree hoax

Charles Theophile de Jaeger (27 February 1911 – 19 May 2000) was a cameraman for the BBC. He is best known as one of the creators of a famous April Fools' Day joke from 1957: a three-minute spoof report on the Swiss spaghetti harvest beside Lake Lugano broadcast by the British current affairs programme Panorama.

== Early years ==
De Jaeger was born in Vienna. He worked for the Free French Film Unit during World War II and joined the BBC in July 1943, working as a sub-editor on news for Central Europe. He became a television cameraman in 1948. He was the first BBC newsreel cameraman to film outside the United Kingdom.

== April Fools 1957 ==
The idea for the April Fool came from his school days, during which a teacher had once said "Boys, you are so stupid, you'd believe me if I told you that spaghetti grew on trees". He developed the idea with producer David Wheeler and it was approved by the editor of Panorama, Michael Peacock. A silent film was recorded in Castagnola in Switzerland in March and a commentary written by Wheeler was added by respected broadcaster Richard Dimbleby.

== Personal life ==
De Jaeger left the BBC in 1959 to become a freelancer. He died in London in May 2000.
