= Grace Wyndham Goldie =

British producer and executive in television (1900–1986)

- Born: Grace Murrell Nisbet; 26 March 1900; Arisaig, Lochaber, Scotland
- Died: 3 June 1986 (aged 86); Kensington, London, England
- Occupations: Television and radio producer and executive
- Employer: BBC
- Title: Head of BBC Television Talks, later Head of BBC News and Current Affairs
- Spouse: Frank Wyndham Goldie

Grace Wyndham Goldie OBE (née Grace Murrell Nisbet; 26 March 1900 – 3 June 1986) was a British producer and executive in television for twenty years, particularly in the fields of politics and current affairs. During her career at the BBC, she was one of the few senior women in an establishment dominated by men.

Beginning as a radio producer, Wyndham Goldie soon moved into television and pioneered many of the formats now taken for granted in Britain. She became Head of Talks and later Head of the Current Affairs Group at BBC Television. David Attenborough described her as "one of the most influential of television's pioneers [...] During her career she helped and encouraged countless people who were working in the medium and excited by its possibilities."

== Early life ==
She was born Grace Murrell Nisbet in Arisaig, a small village in the western Scottish Highlands. Much of her childhood was spent in Egypt, where her father worked as a civil engineer, and she attended a French Catholic convent school in Alexandria before attending Cheltenham Ladies' College. Nisbet obtained her first degree at Bristol University, and then attended Somerville College, Oxford. In 1928, Nisbet married Frank Goldie, an actor who used the stage name Wyndham Goldie, which she adopted as her married name. Frank Goldie died in 1957.

== Career ==
Wyndham Goldie developed her interest in broadcasting while as a weekly columnist for The Listener, which reprinted the texts of BBC talks, between 1935 and 1941. She specialised in drama and entertainment, and wrote enthusiastically about the new medium of television. After working as a civil servant at the Board of Trade from 1942 to 1944, she was invited to join the BBC as a radio producer in June 1944. In 1947, she joined the Television Talks Department.

Wyndham Goldie pioneered television coverage of general elections and the coverage of politics and current affairs on television. The first general election which the television service was able to cover occurred in February 1950. The BBC engaged in no reporting of the campaign whatsoever because of a cautious reading of the Representation of the People Act 1948. However, producer Grace Wyndham Goldie managed to persuade the BBC to transmit a programme on election night to report the results only – there was to be absolutely no prediction of what was to come.

By 1955, the existence of television on election nights was having a significant effect. It prompted returning officers to hold their counts immediately after the close of polls, so that the results were declared during the early hours of the morning, rather than the following day. In 1955, for the first time, a majority of constituencies declared on the night (357 of the 630 constituencies).

In 1952 Wyndham Goldie started a new programme, Press Conference, which was based on a format imported from US television. Each week four journalists interviewed a leading politician. The first politician to appear was R. A. Butler, then the Chancellor of the Exchequer. Subsequent guests included the Secretary-General of the United Nations, Dag Hammarskjöld, and the mayor of Berlin. Her boss, Cecil McGivern, wrote to her after the first programme: "You did not invent the idea, my dear, of press people questioning politicians; this has already been done in the States. So you have not changed the nature of television, but by God you have changed the whole future of politics in Britain."

Wyndham Goldie relaunched the ailing Panorama in 1955, with Richard Dimbleby as the main presenter. She was instrumental in recruiting Robin Day from ITN to present the programme at the end of the 1950s. She was associated with the successful production of two other influential BBC TV programmes: Tonight, and Monitor. The first was a nightly news magazine, while the second covered the arts. Among her team of producers and reporters, the so-called 'Goldie Boys', for whom her key word was “balance”, were Alasdair Milne, Huw Wheldon, John Freeman, Christopher Mayhew, Cliff Michelmore, Richard Dimbleby, Donald Baverstock and Michael Peacock.

Wyndham Goldie had a low opinion of journalists whom she described as "the dirty mac brigade". She did not like the idea of "the story" and thought that scoops were boys' games. However, she respected the serious journalism that was embodied in such publications as The Times, The Manchester Guardian, The Economist and the New Statesman.

Wyndham Goldie's relationship to That Was The Week That Was, the satirical TV series broadcast in 1962–63, was an uneasy one. Her biographer John Grist writes: "Grace's dilemma was this; this was not only a Current Affairs programme but it included entertainment, which was a roundabout way of saying she did not want to have anything to do with it. She was right in that it included a show business element in which she was entirely untutored and had no interest."

As "Head of Talks" at BBC Television, she had a huge influence on the development of the serious side of BBC TV broadcasting. She passionately defended public service broadcasting, and advocated keeping the BBC independent of government interference. She retired from the BBC in 1965, at the age of 65.

Grace Wyndham Goldie died on 3 June 1986 at the age of 86. A blue plaque marks St Mary Abbot's Court in Kensington, where she lived for over 50 years.

== Publications ==
- Facing the Nation: Television & Politics 1936–76, The Bodley Head, 1977 ISBN 978-0-370-01383-1
