= Spaghetti-tree hoax =

1957 April Fool's hoax report broadcast on BBC

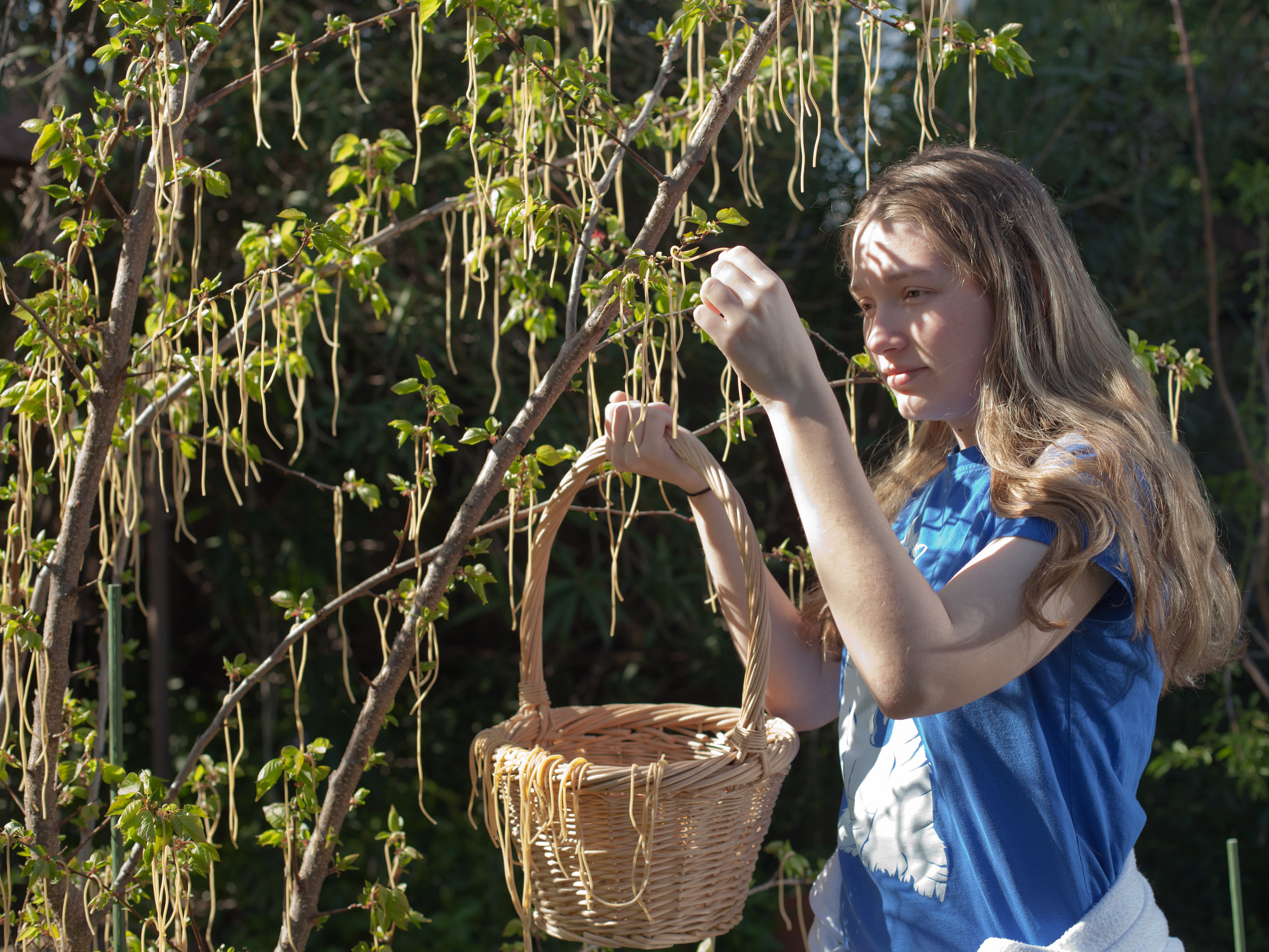
A recreation of a scene from the report, showing a woman harvesting cooked spaghetti from the branches of a tree

The spaghetti-tree hoax was a three-minute hoax report broadcast on April Fools' Day 1957 by the BBC current-affairs programme Panorama, purportedly showing a family in southern Switzerland harvesting spaghetti from a "spaghetti tree". At the time of the report's broadcast, spaghetti was relatively unknown in the United Kingdom, and a number of viewers contacted the BBC afterwards for advice on growing their own spaghetti trees. Decades later, CNN called this broadcast "the biggest hoax that any reputable news establishment ever pulled".

== Broadcast ==
The news report was produced as an April Fools' Day joke in 1957, and presented a family in the canton of Ticino in southern Switzerland gathering a bumper spaghetti harvest after a mild winter and "virtual disappearance of the spaghetti weevil". Footage of a traditional "Harvest Festival" was aired along with a discussion of the breeding necessary to develop a strain to produce the perfect length of spaghetti. Some scenes were filmed at the (now closed) Pasta Foods factory on London Road, St Albans, in Hertfordshire, and at a hotel in Castagnola, Switzerland.

Panorama cameraman Charles de Jaeger dreamed up the story after remembering how teachers at his school in Austria teased his classmates for being so stupid that if they were told that spaghetti grew on trees, they would believe it. The editor of Panorama, Michael Peacock, told the BBC in 2014 how he gave de Jaeger a budget of £100 and sent him off. The report was made more believable through its voice-over by respected broadcaster Richard Dimbleby. Peacock said Dimbleby knew they were using his authority to make the joke work, and that Dimbleby loved the idea and went at it eagerly.

At the time, 7 million of the 15.8 million homes (about 44%) in Britain had television receivers. Pasta was not an everyday food in 1950s Britain, and it was known mainly from tinned spaghetti in tomato sauce and considered by many to be an exotic delicacy. An estimated eight million people watched the programme on 1 April 1957, and hundreds phoned in the following day to question the authenticity of the story or ask for more information about spaghetti cultivation and how they could grow their own spaghetti trees; the BBC told them to "place a sprig of spaghetti in a tin of tomato sauce and hope for the best".

== See also ==
- List of April Fools' Day jokes
- Agriculture in Switzerland
- Flying penguin hoax
- Hotheaded Naked Ice Borer
- House hippo
- Lenin was a mushroom
- Mockumentary
- Pacific Northwest tree octopus
