= Anthony Isaac =

- Born: 1941; Wakefield, England
- Died: 1985 (aged 43–44) Market Overton, Rutland, England
- Occupation: Composer
- Spouse: April Walker

Anthony Philip 'Spike' Isaac (January 1941 - 1985) was a British composer. He is mostly remembered for his television and film score music, particularly The Onedin Line and Survivors. He was also musical director at the New Theatre Royal Lincoln, from 1965 to 1967.

== Filmography ==
- One Hour to Zero (1976)

== TV ==
- Counterstrike (1969)
- Barlow at Large (1971)
- The Onedin Line (1971)
- The Millionairess (1972)
- Sutherland's Law (1973)
- Warship (1973)
- Notorious Woman (1974)
- Skiboy (1974)
- The Main Chance (1975)
- Survivors (1975)
- Don't Forget to Write! (1977)
- Raffles (1977)
- Sexton Blake and the Demon God (1978)
- Spearhead (1978)
- Wilde Alliance (1978)
- The Omega Factor (1979)
- The Enigma Files (1980)
- Squadron (1982)
- Super Gran (1985)
