= Sexton Blake and the Demon God =

British television series

- Genre: Mystery fiction Detective fiction
- Based on: Sexton Blake
- Written by: Simon Raven
- Directed by: Roger Tucker
- Starring: Jeremy Clyde
- Composer: Anthony Isaac
- Country of origin: United Kingdom
- Original language: English
- No. of episodes: 6

Production
- Producer: Barry Letts
- Editor: Alistair Bell

Original release
- Network: BBC
- Release: 10 September – 15 October 1978

Sexton Blake and the Demon God is a 1978 six-part British BBC miniseries starring Jeremy Clyde as the fictional detective Sexton Blake. It was scripted by Simon Raven, directed by Roger Tucker and produced by Barry Letts. The serial was broadcast by BBC One at tea-time from Sunday, 10 September 1978, until Sunday, 15 October 1978. Like the 1967–1971 Sexton Blake series, it is set in the 1920s.

== Synopsis ==
In 1927, Sexton Blake investigates a mystery involving a stolen Egyptian mummy, an ancient curse and a cult that dabbles in human sacrifice.

== Cast ==
- Jeremy Clyde as Sexton Blake
- Philip Davis as Tinker
- Barbara Lott as Mrs Bardell
- Derek Francis as Hubba Pasha
- Natasha Parry as Cassandra
- Linal Haft as Maremma Bey
- John Biggerstaff as Watchman
- John Carlin as Dr Paterson
- Vic Tablian as Zigiana's uncle
- Jacquey Chappell as Zigiana
- Sonny Caldinez as Abdullah
- Moti Makan as Camden novice
- Darien Angadi as Camden priest
- George Pravda as Professor Lurkov
- Eddie Molloy as Manley
- Barry Martin as Mordecai
- Ronald Russell as Hotel manager
- William Lawford as French train official
- Richard Simpson as Parkins
- Timothy Kightley as Mason
- Farrell Sheridan as Lurkov's manservant
- Michael Forrest as Greek Police Chief
- Harry Tradios as Greek Police Sgt
- Alkis Kritikos as Greek servant
- Maria Moustaka as Guardian of the Snake
- Jaron Yaltan as Egyptian priest
- Ahmed Osman as Egyptian guard
- Stephen Thorne as Voice of Chemos

== Novel ==
The novelisation by John Garforth was published the same year. It was the last Sexton Blake novel published in the 20th century.
