= Rosemary Pollock =

English novelist (1944–2022)

- Born: 26 July 1944 Guildford, Surrey, England
- Died: 8 July 2022 (aged 78) Cornwall, England
- Occupation: Novelist
- Period: 1968–1981
- Genre: Romance
- Parents: Hugh Alexander Pollock; Ida Pollock
- Relatives: Gillian Baverstock (half-sister)

Rosemary Pollock (26 July 1944 – 8 July 2022) was an English writer of a dozen romance novels from 1968 to 1981. She was the daughter of the centenarian romance writer and painter Ida Pollock (1908–2013) and Lieut Colonel Hugh Alexander Pollock D.S.O. Royal Scots Fusilers (1888–1971).

== Biography ==
Rosemary Pollock was born in 1944 in Guildford, Surrey, England, the sole child of Hugh and Ida Pollock, who met when her father worked as editor at book department in the publishing firm of George Newnes, and they lost her mother's manuscript. Her father was a veteran of World War I and assistant to Winston Churchill, and he had been married twice previously. In 1913, he married Marion Atkinson, with whom he had two sons, William Cecil Alexander (1914–1916) and Edward Alistair (1915–1969); they divorced after World War I. In 1924, he remarried the children's writer Enid Blyton (1897–1968), with whom he had two daughters, Gillian Mary (1931–2007) and Imogen Mary (b. 1935). In 1940, he re-joined the Army, afterwards working for a while at the Cabinet Office in London and after met again Ida, he offered her a post as civilian secretary. His marriage had difficulties, and finally, they divorced in 1943 and Enid married Dr. Kenneth Fraser Darrell Water and Hugh married Ida six days later. Enid changed the name of their daughters and Hugh did not see them again, although Enid had promised access as part of his taking the blame for the divorce. After World War II, George Newnes, Hugh's old firm, decided not to work with him anymore. They also represented Enid Blyton and were not willing to let her go. After this the marriage experienced financial problems and, in 1950, Hugh had to declare bankruptcy while he struggled with alcoholism. Her mother decided to help writing popular contemporary romances. Soon, she became a prolific and successful romantic novelist, her books (under ten different pseudonyms) being brought out by several major publishers.

During Rosemary's early years the family travelled widely and lived in many parts of England. It was Rosemary's asthma that brought the family to Cornwall. They also lived in Ireland, France, Italy, Malta and Switzerland, where they successfully obtained a lasting cure for Rosemary's debilitating condition. Her father died on 8 November 1971 in Malta, where he is buried in the British military cemetery. After his death, her mother and she returned to England and they lived for several years in Wiltshire, before moving to Lanreath in 1986. After Enid Blyton's death, Rosemary was put in touch with her half sisters, but their father never saw them again. Her mother died on 3 December 2013, aged 105.

== Career ==
Rosemary wrote a dozen romance novels from 1968 to 1981, and also helped her mother with some of her many projects. In 2009, at 100 years her mother published her autobiography, Starlight.

== Bibliography ==
=== As Rosemary Pollock ===
==== Novels ====
- The Breadth of Heaven (1968)
- A Touch of Starlight (1969)
- The Mountains of Spring (1971)
- Song Above the Clouds (1972)
- Summer Comes Slowly (1976)
- Tiger in Darkness (1978)
- White Hibiscus (1979)
- The Sun and Catriona (1981)

==== Anthologies in collaboration ====
- Mountains of Spring / O'kiss Me, Kate / Blue Jasmine (1976) (with Valerie Thian and Violet Winspear)
- Sea Lightning / White Hibiscus / Liberated Lady (1987) (with Linda Harrel and Sally Wentworth)
