= Stephen R. Hudis =

English film director (born 1957)

- Born: May 17, 1957 (age 69); London, England
- Occupations: Director, stunt coordinator, actor
- Years active: 1970–present

Stephen R. Hudis (born May 17, 1957) is an English actor, stunt coordinator, and director.

== Career ==
As a child, he worked as an actor in the 1972 John Wayne film The Cowboys, and starred in the 1973-1974 TV series Skiboy, produced for ITC by Derrick Sherwin and set and filmed in Switzerland. He later established a career as a stunt man, stunt driver, and stunt coordinator, working on such films and television series as Miracle Mile, Route 666, Cousin Sarah, Star Trek: Voyager, Adam-12, and CSI: NY.

He is married to author Lindy S. Hudis, and they have two children.
