= Flying penguin hoax =

April Fools' Day hoax

Flying Adélie penguins

Miracles of Evolution is a BBC film trailer featuring flying penguins made in 2008 as an April Fools' Day hoax. The film was advertised as compelling evidence for Charles Darwin's theory of evolution. It was largely set on King George Island, 120 kilometres (74.56 miles) from mainland Antarctica.

The Daily Telegraph wrote that the film was "an instant classic. It is accomplished work of this kind that guarantees the BBC its unique status."

The BBC website still claims that it may attempt to film the flying penguins again because the original film did not explain how such small birds, that are not used to flying, could survive long migrations over vast, stormy oceans. Miracles of Evolution was filmed with animated penguins for the occasion of April Fools' Day, and to promote the BBC iPlayer.

MSN included "The BBC's flying penguins" as one of their twelve "hoaxes of the decade."

== The film ==
The film features Adélie penguins that live in Antarctica. Adélie penguins are one of the most southern seabirds in the world. The film claims that long and extremely cold Antarctic winters forced some groups of Adélies to adapt by (re)gaining the ability to fly. In the film the penguins travel thousands of kilometres to the rainforests of South America. The narrative of the film discourages adventurers from trying to see flying penguins on their own. These birds are rare, "elusive and secretive". It is all but impossible to find them in the dense jungles of South America, or even to see their migration over the southern oceans. After migrating, the penguins are shown landing in the canopy of the rainforest.

The film was narrated by Terry Jones (of Monty Python fame). Walking in Antarctica between Adélies, Jones says:

We'd been watching the penguins and filming them for days, without a hint of what was to come. But then the weather took a turn for the worse. It was quite amazing. Rather than getting together in a huddle to protect themselves from the cold, they did something quite unexpected, that no other penguins can do.

The film shows birds taking off one after another, with the sky turned from normal blue to sunset orange and the whole sky soon becoming filled with thousands of large flocks of birds and flying penguins. The film shows the penguins flying over icebergs and through a hole in an iceberg. Antarctica is then left behind and viewers see the green of South America's rainforests. In a remastered version, the penguins migrate all over Antarctica to all the southern hemisphere continents.

== Film promotions ==
On 1 April 2008, rival newspapers The Daily Telegraph and The Daily Mirror both published articles about the upcoming film. The Mirror ran the story on its front page, and in The Daily Telegraph the story was one of the most important of the day. The Daily Telegraph proclaimed that the BBC had "remarkable footage of penguins flying as part of its new natural history series, Miracles of Evolution."

Chris Tryhorn, a news editor for The Guardian, admitted that the story "gave him pause for thought" when two of his rivals, The Daily Mirror and The Daily Telegraph, published synchronized stories on such an important discovery. Tryhorn said that he started to put the pieces together based upon the publication date, Monty Python's Terry Jones being the host and the film maker being called Prof Alid Loyas. Tryhorn realised that after noticing Prof Alid Loyas was an anagram of "April Fools Day".

The Daily Mirror later published an explanation for its readers who were waiting for the documentary to be broadcast on BBC One.

The trailer can still be found on the BBC website, however, it is viewed using the BBC iPlayer, which is only available to Internet users accessing from British IP addresses. It can also be found on YouTube.

== Production ==
The hoax was made using diverse techniques and footage. BBC producers used real footage of Adélies filmed in the Antarctic by the BBC. Animated penguins were then created, and to make them fly the animators used a flight pattern used by guillemots that somewhat resemble penguins.

Terry Jones was filmed in a studio with fake snow on the floor and on his polar parka. Later, this footage was combined with real footage taken in Antarctica and with the footage of animated penguins in flight.

== See also ==
Spaghetti-tree hoax, a similar BBC April Fools' Day hoax
