= Pacific Northwest tree octopus =

Internet hoax

Doctored image of the Pacific Northwest tree octopus as it appears on the website

The Pacific Northwest tree octopus is an Internet hoax created in 1998 by a humor writer under the pseudonym Lyle Zapato. Since its creation, the Pacific Northwest tree octopus website has been commonly referenced in Internet literacy classes in schools and has been used in multiple studies demonstrating children's susceptibility to accepting online sources of information at face value.

== Description ==
This fictitious endangered species of cephalopod was given the Latin name Octopus paxarbolis (the species name being coined from the Latin pax, the root of Pacific, and the Spanish arbol meaning "tree"). It was allegedly able to survive both in terrestrial and aquatic environments, and was said to live in the Olympic National Forest and nearby rivers, spawning in water where its eggs are laid. The Pacific Northwest tree octopus was further claimed to prey on insects, small vertebrates, and bird eggs. Its major predator was identified as the Sasquatch, a legendary creature purported to inhabit the same region, along with bald eagles and cats. The conceit of the website was that the Pacific Northwest tree octopus was an endangered species, threatened by habitat loss, overexploitation for the fashion industry during the early 20th century, and eradication as a nuisance animal by loggers.

== Reception and legacy ==
The tree octopus hoax website was used in a 2007 study on 13-year-old U.S. school children's ability to critically evaluate online information for reliability. A 2018 study replicated the experiment in a Dutch school class of 27 children.

The 2007 U.S. study found that slightly more than half (27) of the 53 school children taking part in the study reported the website as being very reliable. Only 6 out of the 53 school children (11%) viewed the website as unreliable. Each of these 6 school children had just participated in a lesson that used this website to teach them to be suspicious of information online. In the 2017 Dutch study, only 2 out of the total 27 school children (7%) recognized that the website was a hoax.

In 2018, the website was selected as one of 30 websites to form the initial collection of the Library of Congress's Web Culture's Web Archive.

== See also ==
- Drop bear
- Spaghetti-tree hoax
- Dihydrogen monoxide hoax
