= Hugh Alexander Pollock =

British editor

Hugh Alexander Pollock DSO
- Born: 29 July 1888; Ayr, Scotland
- Died: 6 November 1971 (aged 83); Malta
- Resting place: Imtarfa, Malta
- Occupation: Publishing editor
- Spouses: Marion Atkinson (m. 1913; div. 1924); Enid Blyton (m. 1924; div. 1943); Ida Crowe (m. 1943)
- Children: 5, including Gillian and Rosemary

Lieutenant Colonel Hugh Alexander Pollock DSO (29 July 1888 – 6 November 1971) was a British publishing editor, who served as a soldier in the Royal Scots Fusiliers in the First World War and in the Auxiliary Military Pioneer Corps in the Second World War. Married three times, he was the first husband of Enid Blyton, and then Ida Pollock, both writers.

== Biography ==
=== Early life ===
Hugh Alexander Pollock was born in Ayr, Scotland, the elder of the two sons of bookseller and publisher William Smillie Pollock (1858–1942) and his wife Jessie Smith McBride. He was educated at Ayr Academy. He and his younger brother Fred worked in his father's business.

He joined the British Army, and became a second lieutenant in the 5th Battalion of the Royal Scots Fusiliers in May 1912. He married Marion Atkinson in October 1913, at the Hotel Dalblair in Ayr. They had two sons, William Cecil Alexander (1914–16) and Edward Alistair (1915–69).

In the First World War, he served with his regiment in Gallipoli, Palestine and France. He was a captain, serving as an adjutant, in September 1915. From December 1915 to May 1916, he had served as commander of the 6th Battalion of the Royal Scots Fusiliers on the Western Front. He had been promoted to major, attached to the 12th Battalion, when he was awarded the Distinguished Service Order in 1919. After the war, he served as a temporary captain in the Indian Army.

=== Publisher and marriage to Enid Blyton ===
After leaving the army Pollock moved to England and joined the publishers George Newnes in London. He worked with Winston Churchill in the 1920s, editing Churchill's six-volume narrative history The World Crisis, published between 1923 and 1931.

Through Newnes Pollock met Enid Blyton, a writer nine years his junior, after she had been commissioned to write a children's book about London Zoo. Their relationship developed, and shortly after he divorced his estranged first wife he married Blyton at Bromley Register Office in August 1924; the couple spent their honeymoon in Jersey. After their marriage the Pollocks lived in a flat in Chelsea. They moved out of central London in 1926 to live at Elfin Cottage in Beckenham, and then to Old Thatch in Bourne End, Buckinghamshire in 1929. They had two daughters: Gillian Mary (1931–2007), and Imogen Mary (1935–2020). The family moved in 1938, settling in a large house in Beaconsfield in Buckinghamshire which was named Green Hedges by readers of Blyton's magazine Sunny Stories.

Pollock became a heavy drinker in the late 1930s. His marriage to Blyton came under severe strain, and she had a series of affairs, the most serious being with Kenneth Fraser Darrell Waters, a London surgeon, in 1941.

Pollock rejoined the Army after the outbreak of the Second World War and worked in the Cabinet Office. He was appointed a major in the Auxiliary Military Pioneer Corps in November 1940, and was appointed the Commandant of the War Office School for Instructors of the Home Guard in 1940, based at a (now demolished) country house at Denbies in Dorking.

Pollock had met aspiring author Ida Crowe, nineteen years his junior, after she submitted in the 1920s her first novel, Palanquins and coloured lanterns, to George Newnes and the firm lost it during six months; Pollock retrieved the book, and it was finally published in the mid-1930s. After years of friendship, Pollock now asked Crowe to join him in Dorking in a secretarial role. During a bungled firearms training session on a firing range, he was hit by shrapnel and Ida contacted Enid, who declined to visit her husband because she was busy and hated hospitals. In May 1942, during Ida's visit to her mother's home in Hastings, a bomb destroyed the house. She escaped unhurt, but her mother was in hospital for two weeks. Pollock paid for Ida to stay at Claridges and he said he had decided to divorce his wife.

Pollock was posted to the United States in June 1942 to advise on civil defence.

Pollock and Blyton were divorced in 1943. Blyton married her lover Darrell Waters on 20 October 1943, and Pollock and Crowe were married at Guildhall Register Office six days later. After the marriages, Enid changed the surname of their daughters and stopped him from contacting them, and he did not see them again. The only child of his third marriage, Rosemary, was born in 1944.

He was a lieutenant colonel in the Royal Pioneer Corps when appointed an Officer in the US Legion of Merit in 1947.

=== Later life ===
Pollock left the Army for a second time after the Second World War with the rank of lieutenant colonel, but found Blyton prevented him returning to his old job at George Newnes, threatening to change her publisher if he was accepted back. She also used her influence to block him from working elsewhere in the publishing business, and he worked in the Cabinet Office. His heavy drinking resumed and he petitioned for bankruptcy in 1950.

Meanwhile, his third wife decided to financially support the family writing romances. Her first contemporary romance was published by Mills & Boon in 1952. Being in print with several major international publishers at the same time, she decided to use multiple pseudonyms and she found success as a romantic novelist. It was their daughter's asthma that brought the Pollocks to Cornwall. After it, they lived at various places in England, Ireland, France, Italy, and Switzerland before settling in Malta. Their daughter Rosemary also became a writer from 1969 to 1981.

Pollock died at 82, on 8 November 1971 in Malta, and is buried at the military cemetery at Imtarfa. His family returned to England, where his wife died on 3 December 2013, at 105.
