= Gillian Baverstock =

British author and elder daughter of English novelist Enid Blyton

- Born: Gillian Mary Pollock; 15 July 1931; Bourne End, Buckinghamshire, England
- Died: 24 June 2007 (aged 75); Ilkley, West Yorkshire, England
- Education: Benenden School; University of St Andrews
- Occupation: Writer
- Spouse: Donald Baverstock (m. 1957; died 1995)
- Children: 4
- Parents: Hugh Alexander Pollock; Enid Blyton
- Relatives: Rosemary Pollock (half-sister)

Gillian Mary Baverstock (née Pollock; 15 July 1931 – 24 June 2007) was a British author, non-fiction writer, and memoirist. She was the elder daughter of English novelist Enid Blyton and her first husband, Hugh Pollock. She wrote and spoke to audiences and the media extensively about her mother as well as her own childhood and life.

== Early life ==
Gillian Mary Pollock was born on 15 July 1931, the elder daughter of the children's author Enid Blyton (1897–1968) and her first husband, Major Hugh Pollock (1888–1971), a World War I veteran. On 27 October 1935, her younger sister, Imogen Mary Pollock, was born. When she was 10 years old and her sister was six, their parents divorced. Her mother later married the surgeon Kenneth Fraser Darrell Waters (1892–1967); and her father married the writer Ida Crowe, with whom he had a daughter, Rosemary Pollock.

After divorce and remarriage, her mother decided that the best thing for Gillian and her sister was not to have contact with their father, of whom they had not seen much during World War II. Enid even changed her daughters' surname to "Darrell Waters". Years later, Gillian tried to contact her father Hugh; but she was never to see him again, although she did establish a relationship with her half-sister Rosemary Pollock, who also became a writer.

Pollock was educated at Benenden School, a boarding independent school for girls in Kent in South-East England, followed by the University of St Andrews in Fife, Scotland.

== Career ==
Baverstock worked as a primary school teacher at Moorfield School, Ilkley, and wrote and spoke to audiences and the media extensively about her mother as well as her own childhood and life. She was estranged from her younger sister, Imogen, who – in contrast to Gillian – did not remember her childhood or Blyton's qualities as a mother fondly.

=== Quill Publications, Ltd. ===
In 1999, Baverstock founded Quill Publications Ltd., with comic writer Tim Quinn, to produce 12 editions of the children's comic book Blue Moon. She wrote a series of stories that were based on popular fairy tales such as "Sleeping Beauty" and "Little Red Riding Hood". The comic is no longer in production.

In 2005, Baverstock defended her mother's book The Mystery That Never Was after claims that it contained "racist overtones".

=== Appearances ===
- Starred in the 1974 BBC documentary, Success Story – Enid Blyton.
- The Edinburgh Book Festival, "Growing Up with Enid Blyton", 26 August 2006.
- Oxford Literary Festival, "Enid Blyton", 25 March 2007.

== Personal life ==
In 1957, Pollock married Donald Baverstock, a BBC producer and executive, at St James's Church, Piccadilly; they had four children: Glyn (b. 1961, d. 1983, car accident), Sian (b. 1958, d. 2006, heart attack), Sara, and Owain. For years, and after her husband's death, she lived in Ilkley, England.

== Death ==
At her death from disease on 24 June 2007 in Ilkley, at the age of 75, Baverstock was survived by two of her four children and five grandchildren; Glyndwr, Dominic, Zoe, Alec, and Georgina.

== Bibliography ==
- Gillian Baverstock, Enid Blyton, Tell Me About Series, Evans Brothers, 1997, ISBN 0-237-51751-5
- Gillian Baverstock, Memories of Enid Blyton, Telling Tales Series, Mammoth, 2000, ISBN 0-7497-4275-5
