= Michael Peacock (television executive) =

British television executive (1929–2019)

- Born: Ian Michael Peacock; 14 September 1929; Christchurch, Hampshire, England
- Died: 6 December 2019 (aged 90); London, England
- Education: London School of Economics
- Employer(s): BBC, London Weekend Television
- Title: Controller of BBC2 (1964–1965); Controller of BBC1 (1965–1967)

Ian Michael Peacock OBE (14 September 1929 – 6 December 2019) was a British television executive. He served as the first controller of BBC2 (1964–1965), the controller of BBC1 (1965–1967), and the first Managing Director of London Weekend Television (1968–1971).

== Early life and career ==
Michael Peacock was born in Christchurch, then part of Hampshire, on 14 September 1929. After graduating with an upper second class degree in sociology from the London School of Economics in 1952, he immediately joined BBC Television as a trainee producer, working under Grace Wyndham Goldie in the Television Talks Department, based at Alexandra Palace, which moved to the Lime Grove Studios the following year.

== Career ==
In 1955, at the age of 26, Peacock became the producer of Panorama, BBC Television's first weekly current affairs series. Under his editorship, with Richard Dimbleby as anchorman, the programme developed a high reputation, and during the Suez Crisis in 1956 audiences reached 12 million viewers. Peacock was responsible for the April Fools' Day hoax which fooled many viewers into believing that spaghetti grew on trees.

Peacock was appointed Assistant Head of Television Outside Broadcasts in 1958. The following year he returned to Panorama, where ratings had fallen badly. He recruited a new team of reporters including Robert Kee and James Mossman. The following year, Peacock, Donald Baverstock and Ian Atkins were tasked with preparing a report into ways to improve BBC Television News. Their recommendations were accepted in full, and in 1960 he was promoted to Editor of Television News, then based at Alexandra Palace.

In 1963, Peacock was appointed Chief of Programmes to lead the launch of the BBC's second channel, BBC2, which was due to begin transmitting in 625-line UHF in April 1964. During the first year Peacock oversaw successes such as Match of the Day, the sitcom The Likely Lads, and the 26-part documentary series The Great War. In 1965, he was replaced by David Attenborough and was made controller of the more mainstream BBC1. Peacock is one of only three people (the others being Alan Yentob and Michael Jackson) to have been controller of both channels.

In 1967, Peacock was appointed as the first Managing Director of London Weekend Television, which began transmission in 1968. In 1971, Peacock joined Warner Bros TV Ltd as MD in London, making co-productions with BBC TV and ITV, including David Attenborough's Life on Earth. He was a founding partner in Video Arts with Antony Jay, John Cleese and Peter Robinson, which they formed to make training films for the world market. Peacock was invited to become Executive Vice President of Warner Bros TV Inc. in 1974, which meant moving with his family for two years to work in Burbank, California.

On his return to the UK, Peacock developed the TV side of Video Arts. He was chief executive of Video Arts TV, and when Milton Friedman chose VATV to produce his Free to Choose series, Peacock was the executive producer, with Michael Latham his line producer.

Peacock helped to found Manchester's Piccadilly Radio in 1974, and was a director until 1987. He was chairman of Unique Broadcasting Co. from 1989, and of UBC Media Group plc until 1995.

Media offices
Preceded by New position	Controller of BBC2; 1964–1965	Succeeded by David Attenborough
Preceded by Donald Baverstock	Controller of BBC1; 1965–1967	Succeeded by Paul Fox
