= Huw Wheldon =

British broadcaster (1916–1986)

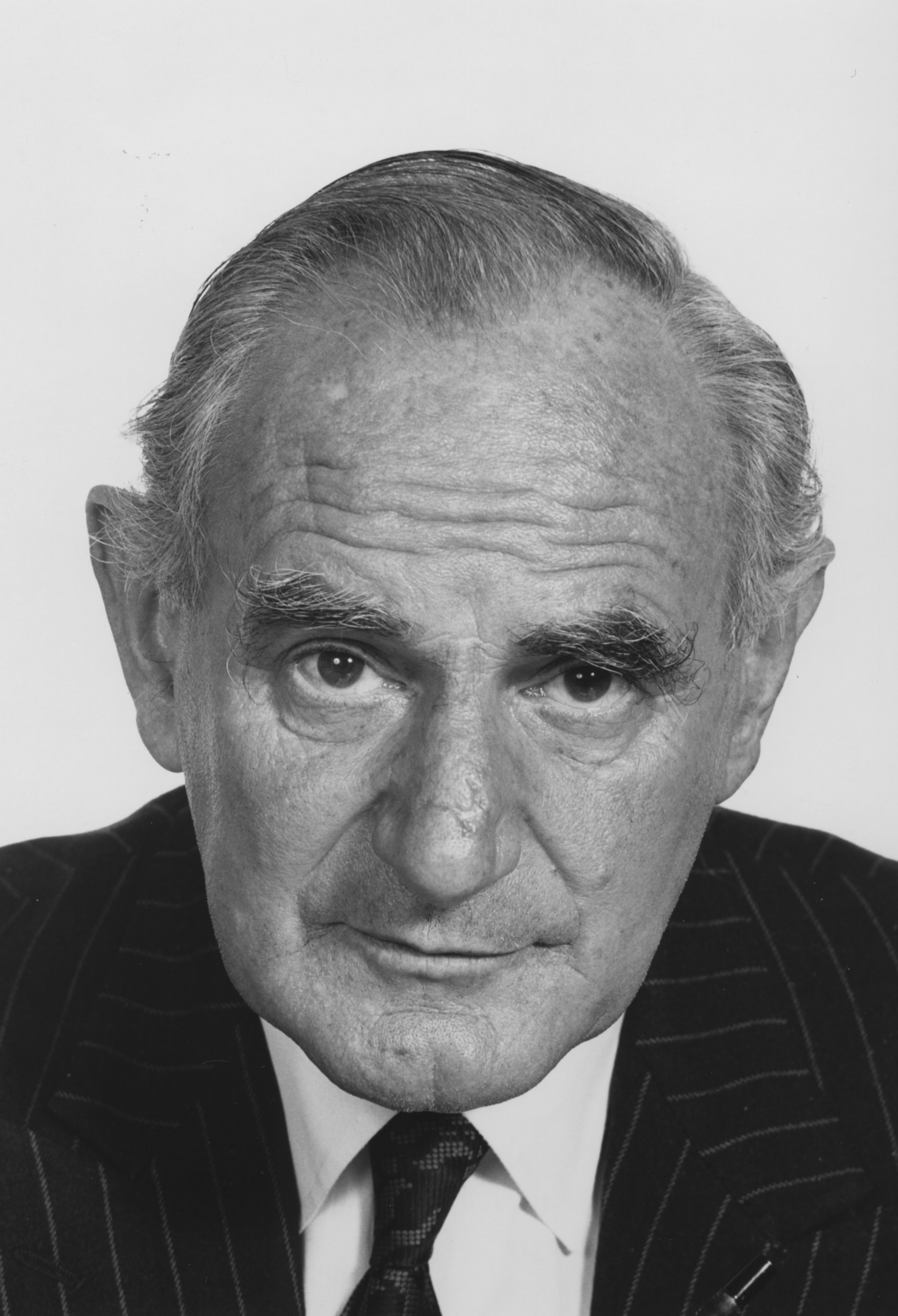
Huw Wheldon in 1980

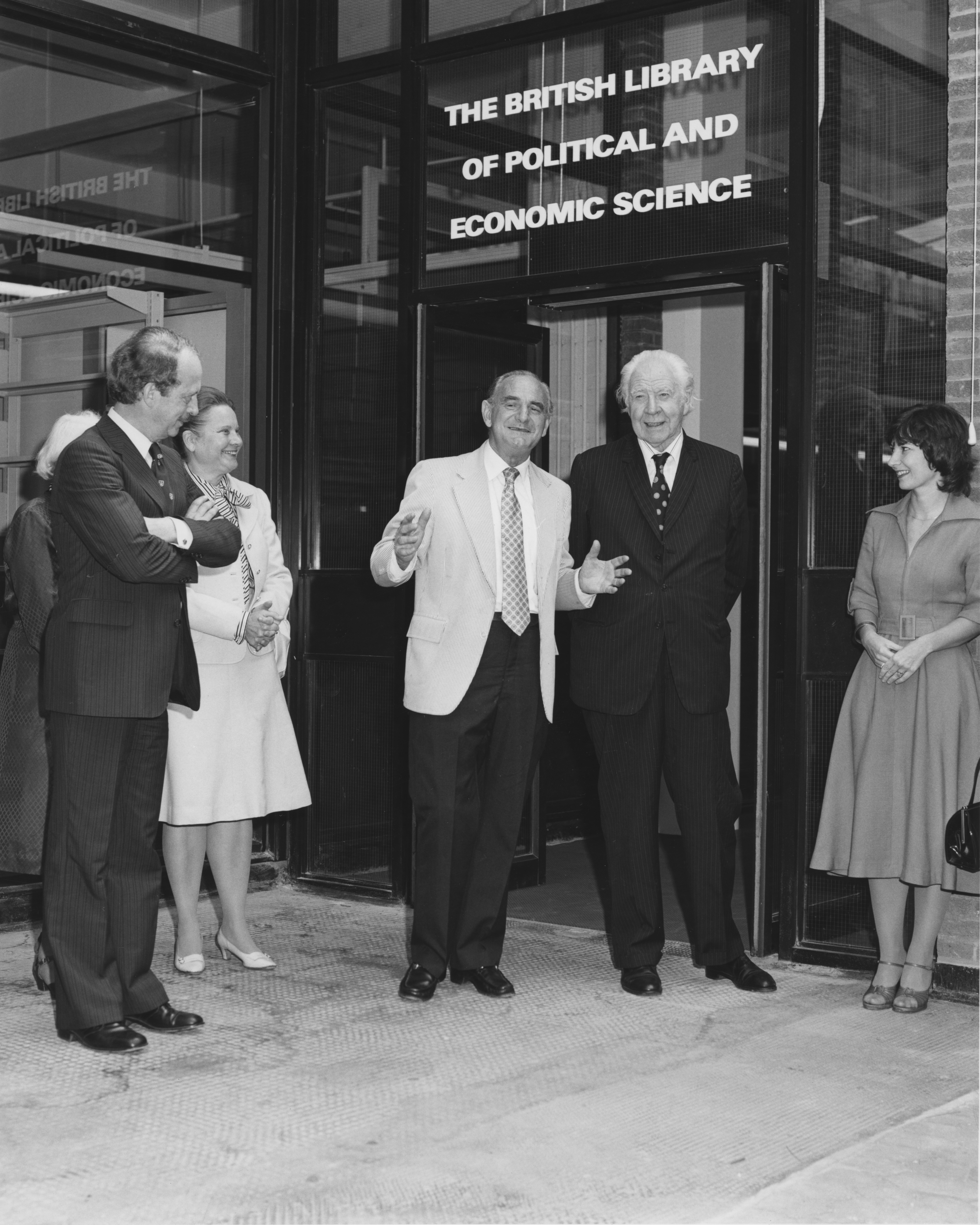
Huw Wheldon (centre) at an LSE building opening

Sir Huw Pyrs Wheldon, OBE, MC (7 May 1916 – 14 March 1986) was a Welsh broadcaster and BBC executive.

== Early life ==
Huw Pyrs Wheldon was born on 7 May 1916 in Prestatyn, Flintshire, Wales. He was educated at Friars School, Bangor, at the time an all-boys grammar school, and graduated with a BSc(Econ) degree from the London School of Economics in 1938. His father, Sir Wynn Powell Wheldon, was a prominent educationalist who had been awarded the DSO for gallantry in the First World War. His grandfather, Tomos Jones Wheldon, had been the Moderator of the Calvinist Methodist Church in Wales. His mother, Megan née Edwards, was an accomplished pianist.

== Military service ==
On the outbreak of war in 1939, Wheldon enlisted in the Buffs. He was commissioned into the Royal Welch Fusiliers in 1940, but subsequently volunteered for the airborne forces and joined the Royal Ulster Rifles, with whom he flew into Normandy. In October 1944, he was awarded the Military Cross for gallantry and outstanding courage on D-Day + 1. He took part in the crossing of the Rhine on the 24th March 1945 and by the end of hostilities held the rank of Major.

== Broadcasting career ==
After the war Wheldon joined the Arts Council of Wales, and then in 1951 became the Arts Council's administrator for the Festival of Britain, work for which he was appointed an Officer of the Order of the British Empire (OBE) in the 1952 New Year Honours.

In 1952, he joined the BBC as a publicity officer, but he was keen to make programmes, and he made his first appearance on television running a nationwide conker competition, and subsequently became a familiar face on children's TV with his programme All Your Own. Future Led Zeppelin guitarist Jimmy Page was a guest on his show in 1957 as part of the J.G.Skiffle Group.

He also began to produce and present adult programmes, such as Men in Battle with Sir Brian Horrocks, and Portraits of Power with Robert McKenzie. He was also responsible for Orson Welles' Sketchbook (1955).

It was with the arts magazine programme Monitor that Wheldon became more widely known in the cultural field. He served as editor of the programme, in the same sense as a newspaper editor, and assembled a team of contributors including John Schlesinger, Ken Russell, Humphrey Burton, and Melvyn Bragg.

"Making the good popular and the popular good has
been a core purpose of the BBC since its foundation."

— Huw Wheldon

Monitor ranged in subject over all the arts: the hundredth show was Elgar (1962), a film directed by Ken Russell and written by Wheldon, that celebrated the composer Edward Elgar. Monitor featured specially made films, sometimes just one full-length item, eventually using actors to re-enact the subjects' lives. Prior to this, only photos or location shots had been used in programmes.

Wheldon's Monitor lasted until he had "interviewed everyone I am interested in interviewing"; he was succeeded by Jonathan Miller for the series' last season.

In 1967, he was invited to deliver the MacMillan Memorial Lecture to the Institution of Engineers and Shipbuilders in Scotland. He chose the subject "Perspectives on Television".

Wheldon then entered BBC management, becoming Head of Documentaries. In 1968, he became the managing director of BBC television, a position he held until compulsory retirement in 1975. During this time he again gathered a team of the talents about him, promoting fellow programme makers such as David Attenborough and Paul Fox to high executive office, and the period of his administration included programmes such as Dad's Army, Kenneth Clark's Civilisation, Alistair Cooke's America, and Jacob Bronowski's The Ascent of Man (the last two were co-productions with Time-Life Television).

After he retired from management Wheldon co-wrote, with J. H. Plumb, and presented Royal Heritage, a ten-part series on the history of the British monarchy as expressed through the Royal Collections. Produced by Michael Gill, it achieved immense popularity ratings in 1977, the year of the Queen's Silver Jubilee. Two other major documentaries followed, The Library of Congress and Destination D-Day.

== Later life ==
Wheldon was knighted in the 1976 New Year Honours. Following his retirement from the BBC he became Chairman of the Court of the Governors of the London School of Economics, where he had read economics before the war. He disarmed potential sponsors of the school by eschewing flattery and opening negotiations with the bald statement that what he was after was their cash. He was also a formidable and active President of the Royal Television Society (RTS). An RTS Memorial Lecture in his name by a distinguished broadcaster is televised annually. Brian Cox gave the lecture in 2010; the following year it was given by Bettany Hughes. Other speakers have included David Attenborough, Jeremy Isaacs and, in 2005, the writer Paul Abbott. In addition to this, the British Academy of Film and Television Arts (BAFTA) dispenses a Huw Wheldon Award for Specialist Factual Programme. There are also Wheldon bursaries and awards at the LSE and the University of Wales, Bangor.

Sir Huw's lasting influence, other than as a programme maker, which was considerable, probably lies in the ways in which he articulated the needs and requirements of public service broadcasting. "To make the good popular and the popular good", "the aim is not to avoid failure, but to attempt success", "multiplicity does not mean choice", were among his favourite sayings. He also coined the term "narrowcasting".

Wheldon died of cancer on 14 March 1986, aged 69. His ashes were spread anonymously in the Royal Botanic Gardens at Kew, where he had served as a trustee, and which he had loved.

Sir Huw Wheldon was highly regarded in the United States, where he had many friends, one of whom, Senator Daniel Patrick Moynihan, caused Norman Podhoretz's obituary of his friend Wheldon, a version of which had first appeared in Podhoretz's syndicated column, to be entered into the Congressional Record.

Wheldon was married to the novelist Jacqueline Wheldon. They had three children. Sir Huw's son, Wynn Wheldon (named after his grandfather), is his biographer.

Cultural offices
Preceded by Prince Edward, Duke of Kent	President of the Royal Television Society; 1979–1986	Succeeded by Paul Fox
