= Donald Baverstock =

British television executive (1924–1995)

- Born: Donald Leighton Baverstock; 18 January 1924; Cardiff, Wales, UK
- Died: 17 March 1995 (aged 71)
- Title: Controller of BBC1 (1963–1965)
- Spouse: Gillian Mary Waters (m. 1957)
- Children: 4

Donald Leighton Baverstock (18 January 1924 – 17 March 1995) was a British television producer and executive, born in Cardiff, Wales. He initially worked for BBC Television in their Talks Department, where he was the Editor of the topical magazine programme Highlight and then co-devised and edited its more ambitious and better-remembered successor Tonight, which began in 1957.

== Early life ==
Baverstock was born in Cardiff, Wales, United Kingdom, in January 1924.

== Career ==
Baverstock worked on Tonight until 1961, when he was promoted to be the BBC's Assistant Controller of Programmes across the whole television service and suggested a programme of hymn-singing that led to the creation of Songs of Praise. In early 1963 he succeeded his superior Stuart Hood to become the Controller of Programmes for BBC1, in anticipation of the launch of the station's companion BBC2 the following year. In the same year he requested Sydney Newman to develop a new Saturday evening show for BBC1 which would become Doctor Who.

Soon after the launch of BBC2 in 1964, Controller Michael Peacock quickly began to run into difficulties, and BBC Director-General Hugh Greene decided in 1965 that the two men would be better suited to running each other's channels, and took the decision to swap them over.

However, Baverstock felt insulted that he was being asked to take what he saw as a demotion to the lesser channel, and refused to take up his new post, instead resigning from the BBC altogether. He subsequently became involved in the establishment of the ITV northern franchise holder Yorkshire Television, becoming the company's first Director of Programmes and overseeing the creation of popular hits such as the soap opera Emmerdale Farm (from 1972). Also in 1972, as ITV commissioned the broadcast of the first nationally televised darts tournament with the 1972 News of the World Darts Championship, Baverstock asked Sid Waddell to accompany presenter Peter Jones and commentator Dave Lanning at the 1972 News of the World Championship, to observe the action and to look into creating a programme based on indoor pub sports. The result of this was Waddell creating The Indoor League, which ran from 1972 to 1977, with the first season shown only in the Yorkshire Television region and the following seasons shown across Britain on the ITV network. The Indoor League was a crucial series in the early years of televised darts.

He left Yorkshire Television in June 1973, and briefly joined Granada plc in February 1974 as head of Granada Video Limited. In January 1975 it was announced that Baverstock had moved back to the BBC, as an executive producer within BBC Manchester, a position which he held until 1977. In 1978 Baverstock was part of a bid by Northumbria Television for the ITV franchise covering the Tyne Tees area, which was ultimately unsuccessful. In 1980 he was part of a similar franchise bid for the ITV Yorkshire franchise, part of a company called Television Yorkshire, which was also unsuccessful.

== Death and legacy ==
Despite being ensconced in Yorkshire, Baverstock did attempt to return to Wales, at one point applying for the vacant post of Controller of BBC Wales. He died in March 1995. Former colleague Leonard Miall claimed in Baverstock's obituary in the Independent newspaper that the BBC Governors who interviewed him were "put off" by his "casual behaviour". Another factor may have been that, although born in Wales, Baverstock did not speak Welsh – an attribute considered essential for anyone aspiring to become the Controller of BBC Wales.

In 2013 the BBC filmed a drama based around the creation and early days of Doctor Who in 1963, as part of the celebrations for the fiftieth anniversary of the series. Baverstock appears as a character in the drama, An Adventure in Space and Time, portrayed by actor Mark Eden. The drama portrays Baverstock at one point wanting Doctor Who to be cancelled after only four episodes.

== Personal life ==
In 1957 Baverstock married Gillian Mary Waters, elder daughter of British children's author Enid Blyton, at St James's Church, Piccadilly. They had four children, and the couple divorced in 1994.

Media offices
Preceded by Stuart Hood	Controller of BBC1; 1963–1965	Succeeded by Michael Peacock
