= Margaret Elizabeth Douglas =

Margaret Elizabeth Douglas OBE
- Born: 22 August 1934; Poplar, London, England
- Died: 20 August 2008 (aged 73); Kensington, London, England
- Citizenship: United Kingdom
- Occupations: Television producer; Television executive
- Years active: 1951–1999
- Employer: BBC
- Spouse: Terence Lancaster (m. 2000; died 2007)

Margaret Elizabeth Douglas OBE (22 August 1934 – 20 August 2008) was an English television producer and executive for the BBC. She joined the BBC in 1951, as a secretary to the Panorama editor Michael Peacock in 1951. Douglas worked on the 1959 United Kingdom general election and was subsequently given the responsibility of covering the proceedings of party conferences at the BBC in 1972. She was appointed as chief assistant to the Director-General of the BBC Alasdair Milne in 1983 and was promoted to chief political advisor when his successor Michael Checkland took over from Milne four years later. Douglas decided to retire from the BBC in 1993 and became the Supervisor of Parliamentary Broadcasting at the Palace of Westminster, a post she held until 1999.

== Early life ==
Douglas was born in Poplar, London on 22 August 1934; she was the only child of the Metropolitan Police constable Thomas Mincher Douglas and his wife, the teacher Dorothy May, née Jones. Douglas grew up in Islington and liked to refer to herself as a "Blitz kid", apart from a year staying with her grandmother in Glasgow before returning to London. She was taught at Parliament Hill Grammar School, which she left at the age of 17, to the disappointment of the school because she knew the only advantage for a woman hold a degree in that era would put her on the road to becoming a teacher, which had no appeal to her and did not want to be a burden to her parents.

== Career ==
In 1951, Douglas joined the BBC in the lowest possible secretarial grade. She was selected for the production secretaries' course and secured her first job at Lime Grove Studios, Shepherd's Bush as production secretary to Michael Peacock, the editor of the Monday night television current affairs programme Panorama. Douglas was overseen by Grace Wyndham Goldie, the Assistant Head of Talks, and became "the princess of Panorama, the right hand of the producer in the gallery, and in the office, the wiper of noses, the stroker of egos, the calmer of the frightened and corrector of the inept." She was taken by Wyndham Goldie prior to the 1959 United Kingdom general election to help run the inaugural challenge of broadcasting an election between the BBC and ITN.

Douglas also worked as a director, producer and researcher for the programmes Gallery and 24 Hours, and impressed enough to be given the responsibility of covering the proceedings of party conferences for the BBC in 1972. This entailed working several hours in Blackpool, Brighton and Bournemouth and caused multiple rows between irate politicians about the coverage; Douglas was able to calm their concerns. She picked up on a majority of gossip and ensured more interesting parts of the conferences were broadcast. Douglas arranged tributes for the retiring journalist Ian Trethowan from the leading British politicians of the time. She left the role in 1983, and Alasdair Milne, the Director-General of the BBC, appointed her as his chief assistant in the same year as he knew her from Lime Grove Studios. This made Douglas responsible for the BBC's relations with political parties. In 1984, she negotiated with the House of Lords on how proceedings in the upper house of Parliament should be televised. Douglas felt it should be broadcast in segments in a way that had no interference with proceedings.

A 1984 Panorama programme called Maggie's Militant Tendency was approved by Douglas and said some Conservative Party Members of Parliament (MP) had links to far-right groups, causing uproar. She was privately disappointed when the BBC awarded out of court libel damages to the MPs Neil Hamilton and Gerald Howarth. Douglas also oversaw a 1985 Real Lives programme that featured an interview of a member from the Irish terrorist group, the Irish National Liberation Army, and anger from the Chairman of the Conservative Party, Norman Tebbit, over his perception that the journalist Kate Adie held an Anti-American stance over the countries' bombing of Libya in 1986.

After Michael Checkland succeeded Milne as the Director-General in 1987, he retained Douglas' services, and promoted her to the Chief Political Adviser, which made her the first woman to hold the position. The Labour Party complained to Douglas that the change of colour scheme in the BBC News studio to blue broke the corporation's impartiality guidelines. Douglas worked to introduce television cameras into the House of Commons in the period between 1989 and 1990. When John Birt replaced Checkland as the Director-General in 1992, Douglas remained in her post as he thought it necessary to retain her services. She decided to retire from the BBC one year later, and was made Supervisor of Parliamentary Broadcasting at the Palace of Westminster. In 1999, Douglas left the role, and retired from all work.

== Personal life ==
She was appointed the OBE in 1994. Douglas married the political journalist Terence Lancaster on 25 April 2000. She died of cancer at the Cromwell Hospital, Kensington on 20 August 2008. Douglas had no children but was stepmother to Lancaster's two sons.

== Personality and legacy ==
John Grist of The Independent described her as "slight in build, with beautiful manners, calm in discussion and lacking aggression." According to Bob Chaundy in her obituary for The Guardian, she "bucked the trend of Oxbridge, male-dominated management" at the BBC. Jean Seaton in the book Pinkoes and Traitors: The BBC and the Nation, 1974–1987 wrote Douglas had earned the respect of all sides of the British political spectrum.
