= Charles Curran (television executive) =

Irish-born British television executive (1921–1980)

Sir Charles Curran

8th Director-General of the BBC
- In office 1969–1977
- Preceded by: Hugh Greene
- Succeeded by: Ian Trethowan

Personal details
- Born: 13 October 1921 Dublin, Ireland
- Died: 9 January 1980 (aged 58)
- Education: Wath Grammar School
- Alma mater: Magdalene College, Cambridge

Sir Charles John Curran (13 October 1921 – 9 January 1980) was an Irish-born British television executive and Director-General of the BBC from 1969 to 1977.

== Early years ==
Curran was born in Dublin. His father, Felix Curran, was an army schoolmaster and his mother, Alicia Isabella Bruce, came from Aberdeen. Three weeks after his birth, the family moved to Aberdeen, then his family moved to Yorkshire in 1924. He was the eldest child in a family of four siblings.

He lived at 91 Barnsley Road in Goldthorpe, having moved from Thurnscoe in 1935. His father taught at Thurnscoe Hill Boys School. His father retired in 1943, and died aged 62, on Tuesday October 30 1945. His son opened the subsequent new Thurnscoe Comprehensive School (now Astrea Academy Dearne) on Thursday 24 February 1972, which cost £500,000.

He attended Thurnscoe elementary school, and St. Joseph’s Roman Catholic Elementary School in West Melton. He later attended Wath Grammar School in Rotherham from 1932 to 1939 with sisters Helen, Pat, and Margaret. He attended the speech day at this former school, in Wath, in March 1970, as Director General of the BBC.

He obtained a first-class honours degree in History at Magdalene College, Cambridge.

== Career ==
He served in the British Indian Army from 1942 to 1945, but left to work in the BBC Talks department. He resigned following a dispute to edit the Canadian Fishing News, but he returned in 1951 to join BBC Monitoring. Subsequent posts included Secretary and Director of External Broadcasting. While Director-General, he served three terms as President of the European Broadcasting Union. He succeeded Ronnie Waldman as Managing Director of the news agency Visnews in 1977.

He was director-general of the BBC from 1 April 1969 to 30 September 1977. He was the first grammar school-educated director-general.

Following the appointment of the former Conservative minister Lord Hill as chairman of the BBC governors in 1967 (ironically, the Labour prime minister who appointed Hill, Harold Wilson, had attacked Hill's appointment as chairman of the Independent Television Authority under a Conservative government in 1963), Curran's arrival marked a return to a more cautious approach after the radicalism of Sir Hugh Carleton Greene.

Curran also suffered criticism from Wilson, at that time the leader of the opposition, who claimed that the documentary Yesterday's Men (1971) was biased against himself and the Labour Party, an assertion the BBC now accepts. A parallel documentary at the time on the Heath government passed without incident.

Unlike Greene, Curran allowed himself to be influenced by Mary Whitehouse. Curran issued an apology to Whitehouse after she complained about the violence at the end of part three of The Deadly Assassin (1976), a Doctor Who serial. Philip Hinchcliffe, then series producer, was replaced after only three more serials and his successor, Graham Williams, was ordered to lighten the tone and reduce the violence and horror content.

It was under Curran that the BBC produced some of its best-loved and most consistently repeated comedy series, such as Dad's Army, Porridge and the first series of Fawlty Towers. Curran has often been blamed for an unenthusiastic and somewhat censorious attitude towards Monty Python's Flying Circus, but the Python team still won many of their battles with BBC officialdom. The Play for Today series continued to take risks throughout Curran's eight years as Director-General. The Morecambe and Wise Show became one of the best-loved British TV institutions ever between 1969 and 1977, and the Curran era also saw the development of Michael Parkinson's hugely popular Saturday-night chat show.

== Knighthood and death ==
Curran was made a Knight Bachelor in 1974. Following a period of ill health, Curran died from a heart attack on 9 January 1980, aged 58. His funeral was held in Westminster Cathedral.

Media offices
Preceded by Tangye Lean; 1964–1967	Director of External Broadcasting, BBC; 1967–1969	Succeeded by Oliver Whitley; 1969–1972
Preceded by Sir Hugh Carleton Greene	Director-General of the BBC; 1969–1977	Succeeded by Sir Ian Trethowan
