= Phoenix Park, Thurnscoe =

Park in South Yorkshire, England

Phoenix Park
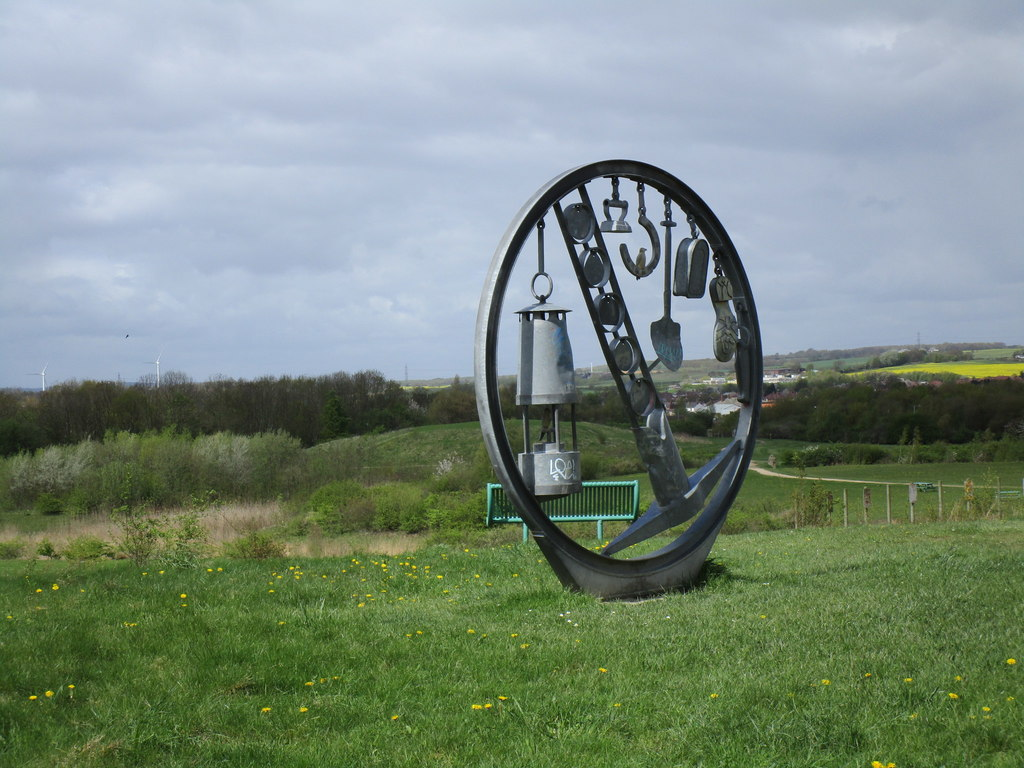
- The Mining Monument overlooking the lower section of the park.
- Interactive map of Phoenix Park
- Location: Thurnscoe
- Coordinates: 53.5412°N 1.3069°W
- Area: Dearne Valley
- Opened: November 2001
- Operator: The Conservation Volunteers

Phoenix Park is a park in Thurnscoe, South Yorkshire, England, that is currently owned by The Land Trust and maintained in partnership with The Conservation Volunteers. It is built on the former site of Hickleton Main Colliery, which ran from 1892 until 1988 when it was closed. The park is 3.3 miles (5.3 km) long.

== History ==
An aerial view of Hickleton Main Colliery from 1926.

Phoenix Park is built on the former site of Hickleton Main Colliery in Thurnscoe, which was one of the main coal mines situating the miners of Thurnscoe and Goldthorpe. It was open from 1892 until 1988, when it was closed.

From 1991 until 1994, work was being done to clear the site and fill in the shafts underground. After that work had been completed, plans were put forward by Yorkshire Forward to redevelop the site as a park with funds from the Homes and Communities Agency National Coalfield Programme. People from the local community including children from local schools designed most of the park's artwork. This artwork was then turned into models and sculptures by Groundwork Dearne Valley. The park was opened in November 2001.

== Artwork ==
Phoenix Park has various forms of artwork around the park's area. Next to the entrance is a climbing wall which has artwork that references the area's mining history. There are various plaques around the park as well as a set of banners, stone sculptures as well as wooden sheep. Two of the park's entrances also incorporate metal flower like sculptures, which have poems written by Mrs D. Chipp. An underpass at the most south part of the park runs below the A635 road and links Phoenix Park with Goldthorpe. In recent years, the local community (Goldthorpe & Bolton on Dearne Big Local) have repainted this underpass with the help of local children.

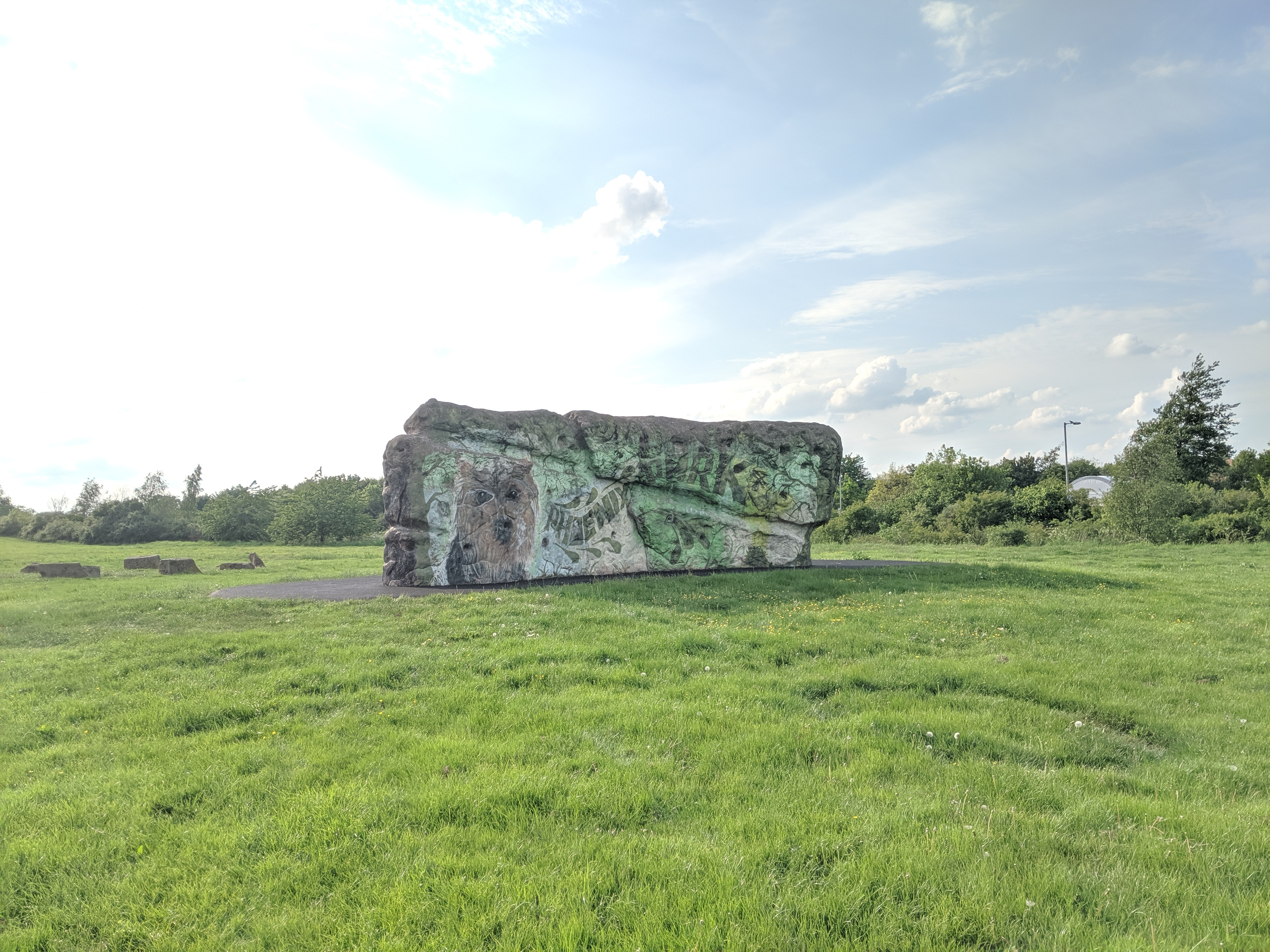
The climbing wall at Phoenix Park, Thurnscoe.
