= Listed buildings in Dearne North =

Dearne North is a ward in the Dearne Valley in the metropolitan borough of Barnsley, South Yorkshire, England. The ward contains seven listed buildings that are recorded in the National Heritage List for England. All the listed buildings are designated at Grade II, the lowest of the three grades, which is applied to "buildings of national importance and special interest". The ward contains the villages of Goldthorpe and Thurnscoe, and the listed buildings consist of two houses and associated structures, a farmhouse, two churches, and a war memorial.

== Buildings ==
Name and location	Photograph	Date	Notes
Low Grange; 53.54910°N 1.31515°W	—	c. 1600	A wing was added to the rear of the house in 1664. It is in red brick on a chamfered stone plinth, with blue brick diapering, sandstone dressings, quoins, a floor band, an eaves band, and a Welsh slate roof with some stone slate. The gables and pediment have stone coping and moulded kneelers. There are two storeys and an attic, and an L-shaped plan, consisting of a front range of five bays, and a two-bay rear wing. In the middle bay is a doorway, a dated and initialled plaque, and a pediment containing an oeil-de-boeuf. The windows on the front are sashes with architraves, and at the rear are mullioned and transomed windows.
Thurnscoe Hall; 53.54169°N 1.31480°W	—	1670–1701	A large sandstone house on a moulded plinth, with chamfered quoins, moulded string courses, a moulded eaves cornice, and a stone slate roof with coped gables and moulded kneelers. There are two storeys and an attic, and an irregular plan, with a symmetrical front range of seven bays, a double rear wing with a lower block in the angle, and another wing with two storeys and a half-basement. In the centre of the front is a Doric porch with rusticated pilasters, a frieze, and a broken segmental pediment enclosing a plaque with a motto and a crest. The windows are sashes, those in the ground floor with moulded surrounds. In the right return is a canted bay window containing a French window, and above is a Venetian window.
St Helen's Church, Thurnscoe; 53.54527°N 1.32227°W		1729	The oldest part of the church is the tower, the nave was rebuilt in 1887, and the chancel and south chapel were added in 1897. The tower is built in limestone, the rest of the church is in sandstone, the chancel has a roof of stone slate, and the rest of the church roof is tiled. The church consists of a nave, a south porch, a lower chancel, a separately roofed south chapel, and a west tower. The tower has three stages, quoins, a round-headed west window in the bottom stage, an oculus in each face of the middle stage, round-arched bell openings in the top stage, a cornice, and a parapet with moulded coping. The windows along the sides of the church are paired lancets, and the east window has three cusped lancets.
Hall Farmhouse; 53.54348°N 1.31185°W	—	Late 18th or early 19th century	The farmhouse is in brick on a plinth, with stone dressings, the roof is tiled at the front and in stone slate at the rear, and it has coped gables and kneelers. There are two storeys and an attic, and three bays. The doorway has a limestone surround, a pulvinated frieze, and a cornice, and the windows are sashes with flat brick arches and limestone keystones.
Stable block and dovecote, Thurnscoe Hall; 53.54203°N 1.31494°W	—	Late 18th or early 19th century	The stable block and dovecote are in brick with some stone at the rear, dentilled eaves, and a stone slate roof. The dovecote is tall, with altered openings in the ground floor and a lunette above. The stable block to the left is lower, and contains a central round-arched doorway, sash windows, and a pitching hole.
St John and St Mary Magdalene Church, Goldthorpe; 53.53568°N 1.30221°W		1914–16	The church, which was designed by A. Y. Nutt, is built in reinforced concrete with exposed aggregate, and has a pantile roof. It consists of a nave, north and south aisles, a chancel with an apse, a south chapel, and a south west tower. The tower has three stages and a hipped roof, surmounted by a clock with decorative framework and a domed cupola. At the west end of the church is a porch, above which is a sculpture of Christ on the cross, under a moulded segmental canopy.
Thurnscoe War Memorial; 53.54432°N 1.31588°W	—	1920	The war memorial is in Thurnscoe Park, and it consists of a statue depicting an infantryman in uniform with a rifle, standing on a limestone capital, on a sandstone pillar, on a square limestone plinth, on a base of three steps. On the front of the capital is an inscription, on the front of the pillar is a brass plaque depicting an angel holding a sword and a laurel wreath, and on another face of the pillar is a plaque with the names of those lost in the First World War. On the plinth are brass plaques with inscriptions and the names of those lost in the Second World War and later.
