= Austen Kark =

British broadcaster

Austen Steven Kark CBE (20 October 1926 – 10 May 2002) was a managing director of the BBC World Service. He was one of three former holders of that post, along with Gerard Mansell and John Tusa, to oppose the plans of John Birt to merge the service into the BBC. After Birt became director general of the BBC in 1992, he had planned to end the service's independent status at Bush House in central London, and absorb it within the rest of the corporation.

Kark had a varied career before his tenure with the BBC. He was the son of a London army major who became a publisher. He attended Upper Canada College in Toronto, the Nautical College in Pangbourne, the Royal Naval College, and Magdalen College, Oxford. He became a Royal Navy midshipman in 1944, serving two years with the East Indies fleet, aboard HMS Nelson and HMS London.

In 1948, at Oxford, Kark directed the first production of Jean-Paul Sartre's The Flies. He later joined his family's magazine business, Norman Kark Publications. One of its magazines was the glossy literary magazine Courier. Kark married Margaret Schmahmann in 1949; they had two daughters. The couple divorced in 1954. Kark married novelist Nina Bawden the same year and became stepfather to her two sons. They had one daughter. He became a BBC reporter in 1954 and became head of the South European service at Bush House in 1964. His experiences in South Europe fuelled his interest in the region, particularly Greece; he would later write guidebooks about the country.

Kark moved to the East European and Russian service in 1972. The following year he became Editor of the World Service. He advised the last governor of Rhodesia, Lord Soames, on broadcasting the 1979 election in that country.

He became controller of engineering services in 1974. In 1980, he chaired the Harare government report on radio and television in Zimbabwe under Robert Mugabe. In 1981, he began a two-year tenure as Deputy Managing Director of External Broadcasting. He was promoted to Managing Director in 1984, exactly 30 years after he joined the BBC.

Kark was the man-in-the-middle of another great BBC controversy – the launching of the BBC World television service to complement its radio counterpart. The idea was first mooted by Kark's predecessor, Douglas Muggeridge – the nephew of the broadcaster Malcolm Muggeridge. Kark retired in 1986.

Kark was a man of broad interests, especially involving southern Europe and the Commonwealth. He became a trustee of the Commonwealth Journalists Association in 1993. In retirement, he wrote Attic in Greece (1994), and The Forwarding Agent (1999), a spy thriller set in the Middle East that was praised by the crime writer PD James, an old friend. Most of his book was written at his home in Nauplion, a small town in the Peloponnese, where he and his wife Bawden spent much of their time. In London, the couple lived in Islington, in a house backing on to the Regent's Canal. His hobbies included real tennis, travelling and studying mosaics. He was a member of the Oriental Club and MCC, and was appointed CBE in 1987.

Austen Kark died on 10 May 2002, aged 75, during the Potters Bar rail crash.

Media offices
Preceded by Douglas Muggeridge; 1981–1985	Director of External Broadcasting, BBC; 1985–1986	Succeeded by John Tusa; 1986–1993
