= Gerard Mansell =

BBC radio stations executive (1921–2010)

Gerard Mansell CBE
- Born: Gerard Evelyn Herbert Mansell; 16 February 1921
- Died: 18 December 2010 (aged 89)
- Employer: BBC
- Spouse: Diana Sherar (m. 1956)
- Children: 2
- Awards: Croix de Guerre; Commander of the Order of the British Empire

Gerard Evelyn Herbert "Gerry" Mansell CBE (16 February 1921 – 18 December 2010) was a BBC executive, most famous for reorganising BBC Radio into Radio 2, 3 and 4 as controller of the BBC Home Service, and for a political conflict early in Margaret Thatcher's tenure as prime minister.

== Biography ==
Mansell was born in Paris to an English father and French mother. He was educated at the Lycée Hoche (Versailles), the Lycée Buffon (Paris) and l'Ecole des Sciences Politiques. As the German invasion of France proceeded in 1940, his family moved to the UK.

He joined the Royal Norfolk Regiment a few months after arriving in the UK. He served in Army Intelligence in the Western Desert, Sicily and northwest Europe. In 1945, he was awarded the Croix de Guerre. Following demob, he attended the Chelsea School of Art for four years; his paintings were of sufficient quality to be exhibited at the Royal Academy.

He joined the BBC in 1951, starting in the foreign news department. He advanced by 1961 to head of the Overseas Service's features and talks section. In 1965, Frank Gillard made Mansell controller of the Home Service. In 1965, he created The World at One, installing Andrew Boyle as editor and William Hardcastle as anchorman. Mansell sought also to distance the station from the nostalgic war-time nickname "the good old Home" and make it more modern and informal. In 1963, to bring a "lighter and brighter sound" to the station, he replaced the Bow Bells theme with Handel's Water Music. The desire for informality also affected news and current affairs programming, with more relaxed and informal conversation as part of the news output.

In 1956, he married Diana Sherar, with whom he had two sons, James and Francis.

In 1967, Gillard and Mansell reorganised BBC radio: the Light Programme became Radio 2, the Third Programme became Radio 3 and the Home Service became Radio 4. This move was controversial, in that it abolished the Features Department and moving talk elements of the Third Programme to Radio 4; his opponents called him "the butcher of the BBC".

In 1969, Gillard and Mansell wrote Broadcasting in the Seventies, a proposal for "a more logical, more attractive and more solvent" pattern for BBC radio, establishing the present template for much of BBC radio: opening more local stations, cost-cutting (e.g., by paring down BBC orchestras) and clearly demarcating the territories of Radio 3 and Radio 4.

In 1972, Mansell was made managing director of External Broadcasting, which later became the World Service. In 1977, he became deputy Director-General of the BBC.

In the 1977 New Year Honours, Mansell was appointed Commander of the Order of the British Empire (CBE).

In October 1979, with the Director-General, Ian Trethowan, recovering from a heart attack, Mansell found himself in controversy. A television crew from Panorama had filmed the Provisional IRA manning a makeshift roadblock in Carrickmore. Newly elected Prime Minister Margaret Thatcher, determined to deny the "oxygen of publicity" to the IRA, complained to the BBC governors. Managing director of Television Alasdair Milne was on leave, so the governors called in Mansell and ordered him to discipline Panorama editor Roger Bolton. Shocked at the apparently casual manner in which the film unit operated, Mansell fired him. The National Union of Journalists called a strike of BBC members and Milne quickly returned, but Mansell satisfied himself that the film was not meant to be used (and had not even been processed), and reinstated Bolton with a reprimand, to the fury of both the governors and the government.

Mansell retired from the BBC in 1981, at age 60. He produced a history of the World Service, Let Truth Be Told (1982). In 1988, he received a Sony gold award for services to radio.

Media offices
Preceded by Oliver Whitley; 1969–1972	Director of External Broadcasting, BBC; 1972–1981	Succeeded by Douglas Muggeridge; 1981–1985
