= Thurnscoe Hall =

17th-century country house in South Yorkshire, England

General information
- Type: Country house
- Location: High Street, Thurnscoe, South Yorkshire
- Coordinates: 53.54634°N 1.30909°W
- Construction started: c. 1670
- Completed: 1701
- Client: Thomas Shirecliff

Technical details
- Material: Ashlar sandstone
Designations
Listed Building
- Type: Grade II
- Designated: 23 August 1963
- Reference no.: 1287037

Thurnscoe Hall is a Grade II listed 17th-century country house located on the High Street in Thurnscoe, near Rotherham, South Yorkshire, England. Built between 1670 and 1701, the ashlar sandstone mansion stands as an architectural record of the region's transition from a wealthy agricultural community into an industrialised coal-mining hub.

== History ==
=== Agrarian origins (1670–1926) ===
The mansion was originally commissioned as a grand private estate for Thomas Shirecliff (alternatively spelled Shirecliffe) during the late Stuart period. Prior to the Industrial Revolution, Thurnscoe was an affluent agricultural parish renowned throughout the region for medieval cheese production. Shirecliff constructed the hall from premium ashlar sandstone to reflect his status as a major local landowner within this thriving farming economy.

The property later passed to Thornaby Taylor, who became the final official Lord of the Manor of Thurnscoe. Following Taylor's death without an heir in 1926, the formal manorial lineage of Thurnscoe officially ended.

=== Industrial and modern eras (1926–present) ===
The vacancy of the manor house coincided with a rapid industrial shift in the Dearne Valley, sparked by the growth of the nearby Hickleton Main Colliery. As the agrarian lifestyle waned, the surrounding farmlands belonging to the original Hall Farm estate were systematically broken up and sold for local civic facilities, community allotments, and high-density terraced housing for miners.

During the mid-to-late 20th century, the hall was acquired by industrial entities, eventually coming under the ownership of British Coal and later private industrialist F. Sedgwick, serving primarily as executive housing and administrative offices. In 1989, reflecting the decline of the local coal industry, the building was internally modified, expanded, and converted into a 32-bed commercial nursing home. After the care home closed in the 2010s, the estate underwent extensive modern regeneration in the 2020s, transforming the remaining grounds into a private residential courtyard development known as Thurnscoe Hall Mews.

== Architecture ==
The building features a two-storey-and-attic main range constructed from ashlar sandstone with a stone slate roof. The primary facade displays a symmetrical seven-bay front accented by chamfered corner quoins and a moulded plinth at sill level. The rear profile incorporates an intersecting lower block within the main range angle, a double wing to the back-left, and a multi-level section that includes a rare local example of an exterior-accessible half-basement.

The ground floor displays 4-pane sash windows within projecting bead-moulded surrounds, while the first floor preserves multi-pane sashes with classic glazing bars. A central, narrow 8-pane window sits directly above a Doric stone porch. The entrance porch is crowned by a broken segmental pediment enclosing an animal-head crest and the Latin motto "Famen Extendere Factis" (To extend one's fame by deeds), added by Thornaby Taylor. The right-hand return of the building features a ground-floor canted bay window with a French door and an ornate, detailed Venetian window layout on the first floor.

=== Associated structures ===
Located approximately 20 metres north of the main house is a late 18th-century brick stable block and a tall, square dovecote. Constructed from deep red brick with sandstone dressing, these outbuildings are protected under a separate Grade II statutory listing, noting their group value with the main hall.

== See also ==
- Grade II* listed buildings in South Yorkshire
- Listed buildings in Dearne North
