= Terence Lancaster =

British journalist (1920–2007)

- Born: 29 November 1920; Salisbury, Wiltshire, England
- Died: 6 October 2007 (aged 86); London, England
- Occupation: Journalist
- Spouses: Brenda Abbott (m. 1941; died 1998); Margaret Elizabeth Douglas (m. 2000)
- Children: 2

Terence Roger Lancaster (29 November 1920 – 6 October 2007) was a British journalist, socialist, and the political editor of the Daily Mirror in the 1970s and 1980s.

== Early life ==
Terence Lancaster was born on 29 November 1920, the only son of Reginald Lancaster, who owned a family firm of printers, and Dorothy (née McMahon) of Salisbury, Wiltshire. During the war he worked as an officer in RAF Intelligence in the Western Desert Campaign, the youngest such officer, and subsequently in Italy and Germany. He had wanted to become air crew, but had failed the medical test.

== Career ==
After the war he worked for the Southern Daily Echo in Southampton and the Star, a London evening paper. He contested for Labour the safe Conservative seat of Finchley in 1955, gaining 17,408 votes, and coming second by more than 20%. He never stood again for election.

=== Daily Express ===
In the mid-1950s he moved to the Daily Express, which at that time was owned by Lord Beaverbrook and was the UK's best-selling national daily newspaper, having a daily circulation of about 4 million copies. He became foreign editor under Edward Pickering; he interviewed Nikita Khrushchev in 1957. He later served under Bob Edwards, and was in charge of the largest number of foreign correspondents in the British press at the time.

=== Daily Mirror ===
After Beaverbrook died in 1964, and Edwards ceased to be Express editor the following year, Lancaster was appointed by Hugh Cudlipp as editor of The People (now The Sunday People). A columnist too, he was soon moved to become the political editor of the Daily Mirror in 1970, after his predecessor John Beavan was elevated to the House of Lords as Lord Ardwick. Lancaster later also became assistant editor. He had a good rapport with prime minister Harold Wilson and his circle, including his press secretary Joe Haines. After Wilson stood down as PM in 1976, Haines was appointed to the paper at his suggestion.

After Robert Maxwell gained ownership of the Mirror titles in 1984, Lancaster was the ghost writer of Maxwell's statement of principles, but Maxwell interfered editorially, despite promising otherwise. Lancaster co-wrote an article with Geoffrey Goodman, at Maxwell's request, about miners' leader Arthur Scargill at the height of the 1984–85 miners' strike; according to Michael Leapman, the article was more vehemently critical than the Mirror had been hitherto. The article though was modified without their consent, according to Goodman, and they insisted on changes approved by editor Mike Molloy. The article was unsigned, because of Maxwell's interference, and both men soon left the newspaper. Lancaster's friendship with Haines ended thanks to Maxwell's behaviour at the Mirror.

Lancaster was briefly a writer for the Sunday edition of Eddy Shah's Today newspaper, and later press officer and speech writer for the Commons' speaker Betty Boothroyd from 1992, and obituary writer for the Times and the Independent.

== Personal life ==
Lancaster married Brenda Abbott (d. 1998), a schoolteacher, on 19 August 1941; the couple had two sons, Guy and John. His second wife was Margaret Elizabeth Douglas, whom he married in 2000, a former chief political adviser for the BBC and Supervisor of Parliamentary Broadcasting at the Palace of Westminster.

Lancaster died from heart failure and aspiration pneumonia at The London Clinic on 6 October 2007, at the age of 86.

Media offices
Preceded by John Beavan, Baron Ardwick	Political editor of the Daily Mirror; 1970 - 1984	Succeeded by Joe Haines
Preceded by	Foreign editor of the Daily Express -	Succeeded by
