= Geoffrey Goodman =

British journalist, broadcaster and writer (1922–2013)

Geoffrey George Goodman CBE (2 July 1922 – 5 September 2013) was a British journalist, broadcaster and writer. Following periods on the News Chronicle and the Daily Herald, he was a senior journalist on the Daily Mirror from 1969 to 1986. Goodman was known as "the doyen of industrial correspondents" for his extensive contacts and prominent role covering British industrial disputes.

He was close to leading left-wing politicians including Harold Wilson, Frank Cousins, Aneurin Bevan and Michael Foot. He briefly served as an economic adviser to Wilson in 1975. After retiring from the Daily Mirror, Goodman was the founding editor of the quarterly British Journalism Review in 1989, and remained its editor until 2002.

In 2020, The Sunday Times uncovered his role as an agent of the StB, the intelligence agency of communist Czechoslovakia, with whom he had contact between 1955 and 1972. The newspaper reported on declassified intelligence archives stating that he received payments in return for providing information and analysis about the Labour Party, trade unions and Harold Wilson's government during his first term.

== Early life and career ==
He was born in Stockport, Cheshire (now Greater Manchester), and was the only child of Edythe (née Bowman) and Michael Goodman, whose Jewish parents had emigrated to Britain from the Russian Empire. His father spent long periods unemployed, and the family moved to Camden Town, London, in 1935 in an attempt to change their situation. Goodman was influenced in his choice of becoming a political journalist by overhearing current affairs being discussed in the local dairy, and a shopkeeper reporting that the newspapers refused to print stories about the Prince of Wales with Wallis Simpson, "despite most of us knowing exactly what is going on".

After adding a year to his age, he enlisted at the beginning of the Second World War. An RAF pilot during his war service (1941–46), he ended the war as a Flight Lieutenant flying Mosquito planes on photography missions. Goodman studied at the London School of Economics under Harold Laski. In January 1947, he married Margit Freudenbergova, who as a child just before the war had been on the final train of the Kindertransport, a means of rescuing Jewish children from Czechoslovakia. The couple had a son and a daughter.

== Early career in journalism ==
After the end of hostilities, he briefly worked on the Manchester Guardian (1946–47) before joining the Daily Mirror, but was sacked at Christmas 1948. He then joined the News Chronicle. A one-time member of the Communist Party, he left it in 1951, and henceforward supported the Labour Party. As a friend of Aneurin Bevan, whom he had first met in 1948 outside St Pancras Town Hall, Goodman gave support to Tribune, the newspaper Bevan had founded just before the war, and helped new staff writer Ian Aitken.

For the News Chronicle, following the 1954 docks strike, he visited all the workplaces over a three-week period. He discovered "astonishing inefficiencies, poor management bordering on the absurd, corrupt trade union practices and a bewildered workforce". Arthur Deakin, the leader of the TGWU, read the articles by the journalist before publication at Goodman's own insistence, and thought the articles were "scandalous inventions". Goodman supported the decision of editor Michael Curtis to oppose the Suez intervention, a stance which split the paper's staff. Slightly later though, until his close friend Michael Foot, he was unconvinced by unilateralism when CND first emerged. Goodman wrote about the socioeconomic makeup of the small town of Sellafield in 1959, around the UK's first nuclear power station.

== At the Herald, Sun and the Mirror ==
After the closure of the News Chronicle in 1959, he joined the Daily Herald and remained working for IPC when the Herald was turned into The Sun in 1964, where his employer was Hugh Cudlipp, whom he once described as the greatest popular journalist of the 20th Century. Goodman joined the Daily Mirror for a second time in 1969, following Rupert Murdoch's purchase of The Sun. He became industrial editor of Mirror Group Newspapers, a columnist and assistant editor of the Mirror (1976–86). Friends with prime minister Harold Wilson, and his successor James Callaghan, who both respected him, Goodman was also able to get on with the Conservative prime minister Edward Heath, who invited him to Chequers.

From July 1975 to August 1976, he headed a counter-inflationary unit for the Labour government. The Awkward Warrior, Goodman's biography of trade union leader and politician Frank Cousins, appeared in 1979.

In 1984, Mirror Group Newspapers was acquired by Robert Maxwell, "the maniac on the ninth floor", according to Goodman. In July 1984, Maxwell interfered with one of the journalist's columns on the 1984–85 miners' strike, cutting a revelation concerning Margaret Thatcher's non-conciliatory attitude towards the 1974 miners' strike, and her vote in cabinet against Edward Heath's decision to call a general election in February 1974.

Goodman threatened to resign unless given an undertaking that it would not happen again. Such an assurance was also given to his colleagues Paul Foot and John Pilger, but the three men realised that such a guarantee from Maxwell was meaningless. Along with colleague Terence Lancaster, Goodman insisted on dropping his by-line from an article both men co-wrote at Maxwell's insistence stridently attacking NUM leader Arthur Scargill at the peak of the miners' strike. Goodman retired from the Mirror in 1986. He regretted not resigning at the time Maxwell became his boss.

== Later years ==
Geoffrey Goodman was the founding editor of the quarterly British Journalism Review (BJR), which he edited from 1989 to 2002. In his first editorial he wrote that "the business is now subject to a contagious outbreak of squalid, banal, lazy and cowardly journalism whose only qualification is that it helps to make newspaper publishers (and some journalists) rich." His later articles for the BJR considered such issues as the role of journalism in the Yugoslav Wars of the 1990s. After ceasing to be editor of the BJR in 2002, he became chairman and later emeritus chairman of its board.

A memoir From Bevan to Blair: Fifty Years Reporting from the Political Frontline was published in 2003. In its account of the Wilson and Callaghan governments, the later volume is free, according to Dominic Wring, of the kind of "score settling" common to memoirs covering this period.

When interviewed by Dan Carrier on 3 February 2011, he was asked about how the role of the Press had changed over his lifetime. While conceding that the amount of information available had greatly increased, "what we do not have is the depth of knowledge, and this translates into a lack of understanding about key current issues. In the old days you had time to reflect. This does not exist now, because of the urge to be first with a scoop, no matter how weak and spurious that scoop is".

In 1998, Goodman was appointed a CBE for his services to journalism. Some years earlier he had received an honorary MA from the University of Oxford and was an associate fellow at Nuffield College (1974–76).

Goodman was interviewed by National Life Stories (C638/16) in 2008 for the 'Oral History of the British Press' collection held by the British Library.

== Royal Commission on the Press ==
Goodman's papers relating to the Royal Commission on the Press are archived at the University of Warwick. These include files relating to the Mirror Group, the Press Council, Scottish Daily News, advertising, editorial standards and journalism, newspaper distribution, the provincial and foreign press, Harold Wilson's evidence and transcripts of oral evidence, press cuttings, interim report, 1974–77, and papers relating to his biography of Frank Cousins. They also include notes from interviews with Frank Cousins, Jack Jones, Harold Wilson, Harry Nicholas, James Callaghan, Baroness (Dora) Gaitskell, Harold Macmillan and Aneurin Bevan.
