= Douglas Muggeridge =

British radio executive

Douglas Muggeridge (2 December 1928 – 26 February 1985) was the controller of BBC Radio 1 and BBC Radio 2 from February 1969 until 1976.

== Biography ==
Born in Harrogate, North Yorkshire, Muggeridge was educated at Shrewsbury School. He first worked as a reporter for the Liverpool Daily Post, joining the BBC in 1956 as a radio producer. He was appointed as controller of Radio 1 & 2 in February 1969. Following on from Robin Scott the first Controller for the two networks, Muggeridge tried to up-date the BBC's thinking on pop music radio. Although not a great pop music fan himself, he was responsible for giving both networks their individual identities and for introducing a twice-daily news magazine programme to Radio 1. Entitled Newsbeat, the programme still features on the network today. In 1971, he appointed Rodney Collins - known as a supporter of pirate radio through his weekly music newspaper columns - as Publicity Officer for the two networks in an attempt to gain more coverage for Radio 1 in music papers such as the NME, Melody Maker, Disc and Record Mirror. In 1972, Muggeridge signed up leading BBC broadcasters such as Tony Blackburn, Jimmy Young and Pete Murray to long-term contracts in the face of the challenge from the new local commercial radio stations. He was later the Director of Programmes and Deputy Managing Director of Radio, before becoming Managing Director of External Broadcasting in 1981, overseeing the BBC World Service. He was Malcolm Muggeridge's nephew.

He died on 26 February 1985 in St Thomas' Hospital, London, aged 56.

Media offices
Preceded by Gerard Mansell; 1972–1981	Director of External Broadcasting, BBC; 1981–1985	Succeeded by Austen Kark; 1985–1986
