= The Revenge of History: The Battle for the Twenty First Century =

2012 book by Seumas Milne

- Cover of the first edition
- Author: Seumas Milne
- Language: English
- Published: 2012
- Publisher: Verso Books
- Publication place: United Kingdom
- Media type: Print (paperback)
- Pages: 298
- ISBN: 9781781680919

The Revenge of History: The Battle for the Twenty-First Century is a 2012 book by British journalist and writer Seumas Milne. An updated edition was published in 2013.

== Synopsis ==
The book is a collection of Milne's columns published in The Guardian over 10 years. Verso Books describes The Revenge of History as an account of the first decade of the twenty-first century. The book indicts the United States presented as a global and corporate empire in decline. Milne also examines the causes of the credit crisis and the Great Recession, claims the policy of humanitarian military intervention to be a failed land grab, offers an explanation of the dynamo behind the roaring Chinese economy and introduces new models of society flourishing in Latin America.

== Reception ==
Naomi Klein praised The Revenge of History as "a book with an urgent message" and wrote that "Reading Seumas Milne, one often has a feeling of physical relief: finally someone not only sees the truth but articulates it with thrilling erudition and moral clarity".

In The Guardian Owen Hatherley wrote "Milne has a knack for making arguments which when published are excoriated as unforgivable, and which then gradually become guiltily commonsensical" and broadly praised the work.

Al Jazeera published a review which suggested that "As The Revenge of History reminds us, it is the left which has got the major judgement calls of the last 10 years – on economic and foreign policy – essentially correct, while the political right and many mainstream liberals have got them badly wrong" and which also praised the book.
