= Astrea Academy Dearne =

English school of humanities

Location
- Goldthorpe Road; Goldthorpe, South Yorkshire, S63 9EW; England
- Coordinates: 53.52890°N 1.30526°W

Information
- Type: Academy
- Local authority: Barnsley
- Trust: Astrea Academy Trust
- Department for Education URN: 146501 Tables
- Ofsted: Reports
- Head teacher: Emma Glover
- Gender: Coeducational
- Age: 11 to 16
- Enrolment: 1,157
- Houses: 4
- Former names: Dearneside Secondary Modern School; Dearneside Comprehensive School (until August 1991); The Dearne High School (September 1991–August 2008); The Dearne High – A Specialist Humanities College (September 2008–December 2010); The Dearne Advanced Learning Centre (January 2011–January 2019)
- Website: https://www.astreadearne.org/

Astrea Academy Dearne (legal name The Dearne Academy) is a coeducational secondary school located in the Dearne Valley, Barnsley, South Yorkshire, England.

It caters mainly for pupils from the Goldthorpe, Thurnscoe and Bolton-on-Dearne areas of Barnsley. It currently has around 1,157 pupils aged 11–16 years.

== History ==
The school was previously known as Dearneside Secondary Modern and then Dearneside Comprehensive School until its merger with Thurnscoe Comprehensive School to create The Dearne High School in September 1991. It received specialist humanities status in 2008 making it The Dearne High – A Specialist Humanities College.

In 2007 the percentage of pupils gaining five A* to C grades rose 18% to 54%, but in 2008 the school was one of eight schools in Barnsley to be told by the government that they were not meeting national targets on the number of pupils gaining five A*–C GCSEs. In 2008 the school published a book of short stories, Out of the Shadows: An Anthology of Fantasy Stories, which sold in high street stores and was among the top three fantasy books on Amazon, and in 2009 pupils at the school produced a graphic novel called Fools Gold.

A new school building was constructed during 2010 next to the existing school for £29 million as part of Barnsley Council's "Building Schools for the Future" project, and the new site opened in January 2011 as The Dearne Advanced Learning Centre.

In 2011 the school was one of two in the country to send pupils to a remembrance event in Ypres, Belgium, as part of the Royal British Legion's Poppy Travel scheme. The school was awarded £50,000 in 2011 by the Heritage Lottery Fund.

Previously a community school administered by Barnsley Metropolitan Borough Council, in February 2019 Dearne Advanced Learning Centre converted to academy status, sponsored by Astrea Academy Trust. The school's legal name is The Dearne Academy, but it uses the name Astrea Academy Dearne publicly.

Thurnscoe Comprehensive School was a coeducational community comprehensive school in Thurnscoe which was founded in 1970.
