= Oliver John Whitley =

British Journalist

- Born: February 12, 1912; Halifax, Yorkshire, England
- Died: March 22, 2005 (aged 93); Benderloch, Argyll, Scotland
- Education: Clifton College; New College, Oxford
- Occupation: Broadcasting administrator
- Employer: BBC
- Known for: BBC External Services; wartime monitoring of Nazi broadcasts
- Spouse: Elspeth Catherine Forrester-Paton (m. 1939)
- Children: 5
- Parent(s): J. H. Whitley (father), Margherita Whitley (mother)

Oliver John Whitley (1912 – 2005), son of J. H. Whitley, was a broadcasting administrator who worked for most of his life for the BBC.

== Early life and education ==
Born 12 February 1912 in Halifax, Yorkshire, the third child and second son of John Henry Whitley and his wife Margherita. Like his father, Oliver was a boarder in Wiseman's House, Clifton College where he was resident between 1925 and 1930. He read history and law at New College, Oxford and qualified as a barrister. He married Elspeth Catherine Forrester-Paton in May 1939; the couple had four sons and one daughter.

== Career ==
Oliver joined the BBC in 1935 and, at the outbreak of World War II moved to the Monitoring Service at Wood Norton monitoring Nazi broadcasts. He resigned in 1941 following a dispute over the proposal to move the unit to Caversham Park.

He enlisted with the RVNR, serving in Europe including the Dieppe raid and the Normandy landings and the Far East in the Malaya landings and liberation of Singapore.

On demobilisation in 1946, he rejoined and remained with the BBC until his retirement. He had a long and influential career, much of which was with the External Services

When Barrie Thorne - the BBC's chief accountant - brought up the racism inherent in the Black and White Minstrel Show, Whitley responded: "The best advice that could be given to coloured people by their friends would be: 'On this issue, we can see your point, but in your own best interests, for heaven's sake, shut up.'

== Later life ==
He retired in 1972, with his wife, to Oban. He died on 22 March 2005 in Benderloch, Argyll, at the age of 93.

Media offices
Preceded by Charles Curran; 1967–1969	Director of External Broadcasting, BBC; 1969–1972	Succeeded by Gerard Mansell; 1972–1981
