= John Tusa =

British arts administrator and radio and television journalist

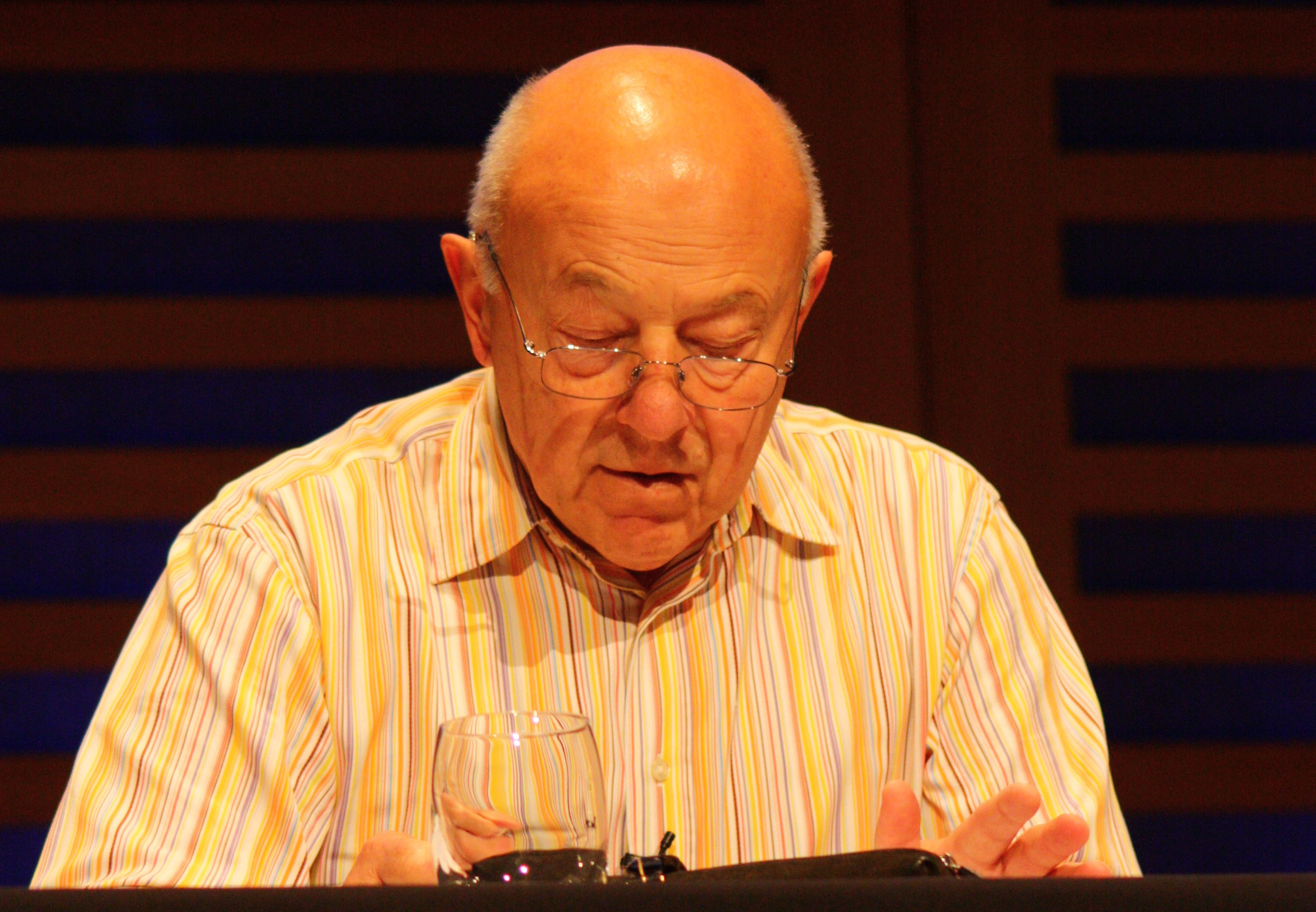
- Tusa in 2010
- Born: 2 March 1936 (age 90); Zlín, Czechoslovakia (present day Czechia)
- Occupations: Arts administrator Journalist
- Spouse: Ann Dowson (m. 1960; died 2021)
- Children: 2

Sir John Tusa (born 2 March 1936) is a British arts administrator, and radio and television journalist. He is co-chairman of the European Union Youth Orchestra from 2014, and chairman of the British Architecture Trust Board, RIBA, from 2014. From 1980 to 1986, he was a main presenter of BBC2's Newsnight. From 1986 to 1993, he was managing director of the BBC World Service. From 1995 to 2007, he was managing director of the City of London's Barbican Arts Centre.

== Early life ==
Born in Zlín, Czechoslovakia, in March 1936, Tusa moved to England with his family in 1939. His father, also John Tusa (Jan Tůša), was managing director of British Bata Shoes, established by the Czechoslovak shoe company, which, following its international pattern, also created a pioneering work-living community around its factory in East Tilbury, Essex. Two days before the German occupation of Czechoslovakia on 15 March 1939, Tusa senior flew out of Czechoslovakia on a Bata company plane, via Poland, Yugoslavia and France. He then became general manager of the Bata factory and its associated village in East Tilbury, living in the nearby village of Horndon-on-the-Hill where his son grew up.

Tusa junior was educated at St Faith's School, Cambridge, Gresham's School, Holt, and Trinity College, Cambridge, where he gained a first class degree in History.

== Career ==
In 1960, Tusa joined the BBC as a trainee. After presenting the BBC's 24 Hours and later Newsnight (from its inception in 1979), he became managing director of the BBC World Service from 1986 to 1993. Tusa was President of Wolfson College, Cambridge from January to October 1993. He was then a newsreader on BBC's One O'Clock News for two years during the mid-1990s. He anchored the BBC's coverage of the D-Day, VE Day and VJ Day 50th anniversary celebrations in June 1994, May 1995 and August 1995, as well as the Hong Kong handover on 30 June 1997.

From 1995 until 2007, he was managing director of the Barbican Arts Centre in the City of London. For several years, he was chairman of the board of the Wigmore Hall in London and was appointed chairman of the University of the Arts London in 2007. For many years, he sat on the governing Council of Imperial College London on which strength was then offered vice-chancellor positions at Reading and then York University, but decided against accepting them because of his lack of financial expertise. In 1987, he had been rejected for the position of Director-General of the BBC for the same reason. He was announced as having accepted the position of chairman with the Victoria and Albert Museum on 18 June 2007, but stepped down from the post a month later, recognising a conflict of interest with his position at the University of the Arts London. In 2013, it was announced that Tusa would be leaving his post at University of the Arts London from August that year, and that Sir John Sorrell would be the new chairman. From January 2009 to 2014, Tusa was chair of the Clore Leadership Programme. In February 2010 he became honorary chairman of theartsdesk.com. In 2014, he became co-chairman of the European Union Youth Orchestra.

Since leaving his BBC World Service post in 1993, Tusa has been critical of some BBC policies. He deprecated the focus and management style of (former) director general John Birt and has been vociferous about subsequent decisions to pare down World Service activities in Europe, including the Czech section.

From 2000 until 2005, Tusa interviewed 55 major figures in the arts for BBC Radio 3. From October 2009, until the end of the year, Tusa presented a 91-part series on BBC Radio 4. Day By Day used original archive news material to track events on a daily basis from 1989, including the fall of the Berlin Wall.

John Tusa's Engaged with the Arts: Writings from the Frontline was published in 2007. It explores ways that the arts can be encouraged within a cultural and political climate in which funding is constantly under threat. He wrote two books jointly with his historian wife Ann Tusa: The Nuremberg Trial (1983) and The Berlin Blockade (1988). His writings on the arts include Art Matters, On Creativity, and The Janus Aspect: Artists in the C20. Tusa married Ann Hilary Dowson in 1960; she died in November 2021. The couple had two sons.

== Honours ==
- Tusa received an honorary doctorate from Heriot-Watt University in 1993.
- Tusa was awarded a knighthood in the Queen's birthday honours list in June 2003.
- Tusa was awarded an Honorary Silver Medal of Jan Masaryk in September 2018.

== Books ==
- Conversations with the World; BBC Books 1990
- A World in Your Ear; Broadside Books 1992
- Art Matters; Methuen 1999
- On Creativity; Methuen 2003
- The Janus Aspect; Methuen 2005
- Engaged with the Arts; IB Tauris 2007
- Pain in the Arts; IB Tauris 2014
- Making a Noise: Getting It Right, Getting It Wrong in Life, Arts and Broadcasting; W&N 2018
- Tusa, John (2020). On Board: The Insider's Guide to Surviving Life in the Boardroom. London: Bloomsbury Publishing Plc. ISBN 978-1-4729-7599-7.

Co-author – with Ann Tusa:

- The Nuremberg Trial; Macmillan 1983
- The Berlin Blockade; Hodder and Stoughton 1988.

Media offices
Preceded by Austen Kark; 1985–1986	Director of External Broadcasting, BBC; 1986–1993	Succeeded by Sam Younger; 1993–1998
Academic offices
Preceded by Sir David Williams	President of Wolfson College, Cambridge; January–October 1993	Succeeded by Gordon Johnson
Preceded by Will Wyatt	Chairman of the University of the Arts London; 2007–2013	Succeeded by Sir John Sorrell
