= Seumas Milne =

British journalist (born 1958)

Executive Director of Strategy & Communications for the Labour Party
- In office 26 October 2015 – 4 April 2020
- Leader: Jeremy Corbyn
- Preceded by: Bob Roberts
- Succeeded by: Ben Nunn

Personal details
- Born: Seumas Patrick Charles Milne; 5 September 1958 (age 68) Dover, Kent, England
- Party: Labour
- Spouse: Cristina Montanari (m. 1992)
- Relations: Kirsty Milne (sister)
- Children: 2
- Parent: Alasdair Milne (father)
- Education: Winchester College, Hampshire
- Alma mater: Balliol College, Oxford; Birkbeck, University of London
- Occupation: Political aide, journalist and writer

Seumas Patrick Charles Milne (born 5 September 1958) is a British journalist and political aide. He was appointed as the Labour Party's Executive Director of Strategy and Communications in October 2015 under Labour Party Leader Jeremy Corbyn, initially on leave from The Guardian. In January 2017, he left The Guardian in order to work for the party full-time. He left the role upon Corbyn's departure as leader in April 2020.

Milne joined The Guardian in 1984. He was a columnist and associate editor there at the time of his Labour Party appointment, and according to Peter Popham writing for The Independent in 1997, was "on the far left of the Labour Party." Milne is the author of The Enemy Within: The Secret War Against the Miners, a book about the 1984–1985 UK miners' strike which focuses on the role of MI5 and Special Branch in the dispute.

== Early life ==
Born in Dover, Milne is the younger son of Alasdair Milne (1930–2013), Director-General of the BBC from 1982 to 1987, and his wife Sheila Kirsten, née Graucob, who was of Irish and Danish ancestry.

== Education ==
Milne was educated at Tormore School, a boys' independent preparatory school in Deal, Kent, followed by Winchester College, a public school in Hampshire. In 1974, he stood in a mock election at Winchester as a Maoist Party candidate.

Following Winchester, Milne attended Balliol College, Oxford, where he read Philosophy, politics and economics, and Birkbeck, University of London, where he read Economics. While at Balliol, Milne was so committed to the Palestinian cause that he spoke with a Palestinian accent and called himself Shams (Arabic for "sun"). His sister Kirsty Milne, who died in July 2013, was an academic who had previously been a journalist.

After graduating from Oxford University, Milne became the business manager of Straight Left, a monthly publication that began in 1979, which, according to Standpoint magazine, was produced by a pro-Soviet faction in the Communist Party of Great Britain, and included several left-wing Labour MPs with pro-Soviet bloc sympathies on its editorial board. During his time at Straight Left Milne became friends with Andrew Murray, who much later again became a colleague of Milne in the Labour Party. Milne himself was not a Communist Party member.

== Career ==
=== Journalism ===
Milne worked as a staff journalist at The Economist from 1981 but was not content working for a free-market newspaper, later describing it as "the Pravda of the neoliberal ascendancy." In 1984, he joined The Guardian on the recommendation of Andrew Knight, The Economist's then editor. Milne's early responsibilities for The Guardian included posts as news reporter, Labour Correspondent (by 1994), and Labour Editor. In 1994, Milne's colleague Richard Gott resigned from The Guardian following an article in The Spectator that alleged Gott had connections to the KGB and was a Soviet agent of influence—charges that Gott vociferously denied. Milne defended Gott against these allegations, which he thought "seemed absurd", and claimed the journalists who had written the expose of his friend were connected to MI5.

Milne was Comment Editor for six years from 2001 to 2007. According to Peter Wilby in an April 2016 New Statesman profile of Milne, his most controversial decision among The Guardian staff was to print a 2004 article by Osama bin Laden, assembled from recordings of one of his speeches. While almost all thought it should have been published, a small majority thought it should not have been run as a comment piece, although the Readers' Editor later defended this decision.

Milne's period in this role was described by Naomi Klein in her book The Shock Doctrine as having turned The Guardian's comment section into a "truly global debating forum." Conservative MEP Daniel Hannan asserted that Milne's greatest achievement "was to take full advantage of the expansion of The Guardian's comment pages ... making them the most thought-provoking opinion section in Britain." Hannan also praised him as "a sincere, eloquent and uncomplicated Marxist". Following changes in staff responsibilities, he was succeeded as comment editor by Georgina Henry, with Toby Manhire as her deputy. Milne was moved to his role as associate editor in 2007, according to Peter Wilby because he was building up too many writers in his own image, and devoting too much space to Palestine.

Milne has reported for The Guardian from the Middle East, Latin America, Russia, Eastern Europe and South Asia, and has also written for Le Monde diplomatique and the London Review of Books. He is reported to have lobbied within The Guardian in 2015 for editor-in-chief Katharine Viner to succeed Alan Rusbridger in the post.

Milne served on the executive committee of the National Union of Journalists (NUJ) for ten years, and is a former chairman of the joint Guardian–Observer NUJ chapter. In the 1980s, he chaired the Hammersmith Constituency Labour Party when Clive Soley (now Lord Soley) was the constituency's MP. Milne told a 2015 May Day rally in Glasgow: "Resistance and the unity of the working class is what will progress our movement."

In October 2015, Kate Godfrey, who has worked as an aid worker in conflict zones such as Libya and Syria, described Milne as "an apologist for terror" in The Daily Telegraph, adding: "I think that he never met a truth he didn't dismiss as an orthodoxy and that nowhere in his far-Left polemic are actual people represented." The attacks on Milne struck James Kirkup in the same publication nearly a year later as being "a little silly, since part of the point of this columnising lark is to say things that get attention and provoke argument: by that measure, he was pretty good at the job."

=== Labour's Director of Communications ===
In August 2015, Milne endorsed Jeremy Corbyn's campaign in the Labour Party leadership election. In The Guardian, he wrote "the claim that the other leadership candidates – steeped as they are in the triangulating 'pro-business' politics of the 1990s – can offer a winning electoral alternative to Corbyn's commitment to what are in fact mostly mainstream public views, looks increasingly implausible. ... But for now the Corbyn movement offers the chance of a break with a disastrous austerity regime – and for a real democratic opening."

==== Appointment ====
On 20 October 2015, it was announced that Milne had been appointed to the team around Corbyn, elected party leader the previous month, as the Labour Party's Executive Director of Strategy and Communications. Reportedly on a one-year contract, he was originally "on leave" from his post at The Guardian and assumed his new role on 26 October. Milne's friend George Galloway tweeted "Just what the doctor ordered" in response to the news. In a soon-deleted tweet, Guardian columnist Suzanne Moore expressed her dislike of "public school leftists" in reference to the news of Milne's new role and speculated that his appointment meant goodbye to Labour.

According to Tom Harris, a former Scottish Labour MP writing for The Daily Telegraph, Corbyn could have chosen for the Comms post "someone whose skills in media management were better known than his personal political views. Instead he chose Seumas Milne, a hate figure for the right of the Labour Party and pretty much everyone else to the right of that." Former Labour cabinet minister Peter Mandelson told the BBC that Corbyn had shown a lack of professionalism in appointing Milne, "whom I happen to know and like as it happens. But he's completely unsuited to such a job, he has little connection with mainstream politics or mainstream media in this country."

John Jewell, an academic at Cardiff School of Journalism, criticised the articles by Harris and others which mention Milne's response to the murder of Lee Rigby. Jewell observes that "the article in which Milne wrote of Rigby not being a victim of terrorism 'in the normal sense' began with these words: 'The videoed butchery of Fusilier Lee Rigby outside Woolwich barracks last May was a horrific act and his killers' murder conviction a foregone conclusion.'"

In October 2015, Patrick Wintour, the political editor of The Guardian, wrote that Corbyn "has been struggling to ensure he receives an effective press since he became party leader, and Milne will be charged with ensuring there is an improvement." In July 2016, Peter Preston, Milne's first Guardian editor, commented about the ethical challenges faced by journalists-turned-political advisers shortly after Milne's appointment: "The 'on leave' tag appears to make Seumas a once and continuing Guardian man, which won't help relations with journalists from elsewhere." According to Alex Spence, Milne has demonstrated a low opinion of much of the British press in his comments. Milne left The Guardian's staff in January 2017, when it became known he was working permanently for Corbyn.

In a July 2016 Guardian column, Owen Jones defended Milne as "a deeply insightful and thoroughly decent man who has been wronged by his media portrayal as a soulless Stalinist apparatchik."

==== January 2016 shadow cabinet reshuffle ====
In early October 2015, a few weeks before his appointment was announced, Milne was interviewed by the Russian government-funded RT television network while the Labour Party conference was in progress. He said that Corbyn's initial front bench constituted a "stabilisation shadow cabinet" and was of the opinion that current Labour MPs were "not only far to the right of most Labour party members, but actually it's to the right of public opinion." Milne commented that reselection in this parliament, necessitated by a reduction in the number of members of parliament due to planned constituency boundary changes, could be used for a "recalibration" of the parliamentary party. In response to Milne's comments on RT, Corbyn's spokesman said in October 2015 that the Labour leader "has been crystal clear he does not support changes to Labour's rules to make it easier to deselect sitting Labour MPs."

While the January 2016 reshuffle of Labour's frontbench was in progress, then-Labour MP Ian Austin said that Milne's actions had been "an absolute disgrace" over the previous few weeks. According to Austin, "people in the leader's office, I'm told by journalists, Seumas Milne, telling us that Hilary Benn was going to be sacked, that Michael Dugher was going to be sacked, a whole long list of people, not for questions of competence or loyalty but because they voted a different way on a free vote." Isabel Hardman, assistant editor of The Spectator, cast doubt on this interpretation when speaking on This Week, giving credence to a view that it was other people who claim to be close to Corbyn who were briefing journalists. While Dugher was sacked by Corbyn from his post as Shadow Culture Secretary, Benn survived as Shadow Foreign Secretary.

Milne made an official complaint to the BBC about the 6 January on-air announcement on the Daily Politics programme by Stephen Doughty that he had resigned as a shadow Foreign Office minister. In a letter to Robbie Gibb, the BBC's head of live political programmes, Milne objected to the BBC following a "particular political narrative." Gibb responded that the programme had merely observed the convention of the BBC, and other media outlets, in breaking news stories. On 21 January 2016, Milne was reported by Andrew Grice of The Independent to be aligned with Shadow Chancellor John McDonnell in a power struggle between two factions in Corbyn's team.

==== June 2016 Vice News documentary ====
A Fly on the wall documentary about the Corbyn-led Labour Party, produced by Vice News, became available online at the beginning of June 2016. Milne was featured asserting that Corbyn's line of attack as Leader of the Opposition for Prime Minister's Questions was leaked to the Conservative government. In a recorded aside, Milne said that it happened "a third of the time", giving then-prime minister David Cameron "an advantage." Labour's General Secretary Iain McNicol emailed party staff to acknowledge that they might be "upset" by Milne's comments and to reassure them that their work was appreciated.

==== Brexit campaign and the Labour leadership crisis ====
Following the unexpected victory of the "Leave" campaign in the 2016 United Kingdom European Union membership referendum, Milne's role as Labour strategist came under scrutiny within the party. Internal emails passed to BBC News were alleged by Labour "Remainers" to show Milne minimizing party leader Corbyn's role in the Remain campaign. Following more than sixty front-bench resignations, and a vote of no confidence with 80% of Labour MPs supporting the motion against Corbyn, Milne was accused by the Labour Party's former strategist John McTernan in the London Evening Standard of talking Corbyn out of resigning. According to Robert Peston, other sources have disputed this claim.

==== Later developments and replacement ====
According to Peter Wilby, writing in the New Statesman in March 2018, Milne as Corbyn's spin doctor "has proved rather good at it. Most lobby journalists, initially hostile, now respect and even like him, finding his calm, courteous and expletive-free manner a refreshing change from many of his recent counterparts." Wilby writes that Milne is the closest of the leader's team to Corbyn, after John McDonnell. Milne was replaced in April 2020, following the resignation of Corbyn and the election of Keir Starmer as Leader of the Labour Party, which John Rentoul of The Independent saw as "the most significant evidence of the fall of Corbynism within the party".

== Views ==
=== Communism ===
Milne has attacked what he calls "the creeping historical revisionism that tries to equate Nazism and communism." In 2002, he wrote that the victims of Nazism "in the distorted prism of the new history ... are somehow lost from the equation. At the same time, the number of victims of Stalin's terror has been progressively inflated over recent years." He argues there is a tendency to "relativise the unique crimes of Nazism, bury those of colonialism and feed the idea that any attempt at radical social change will always lead to suffering, killing and failure." He has written that crimes of communist states "are now so well rehearsed that they are in danger of obliterating any understanding of its achievements, both of which have lessons for the future of progressive politics and the search for a social alternative to globalised capitalism."

In a 2006 Guardian article, Milne argued: "For all its brutalities and failures, communism in the Soviet Union, eastern Europe and elsewhere delivered rapid industrialisation, mass education, job security and huge advances in social and gender equality. It encompassed genuine idealism and commitment ... Its existence helped to drive up welfare standards in the west, boosted the anticolonial movement and provided a powerful counterweight to western global domination." In an October 2012 interview with The Quietus, Milne commented: "Whatever people thought about the Soviet Union and its allies and what was going on in those countries, there was a sense throughout the twentieth century that there were alternatives – socialist political alternatives." His statements were criticised by Rachel Sylvester for The Times. In the same 2006 Guardian article, Milne criticised the Council of Europe and others for adopting "as fact the wildest estimates of those 'killed by communist regimes.'" He has argued that the "number of victims of Stalin's terror" remains "a focus of huge academic controversy", adding that "the real records of repression now available from the Soviet archives are horrific enough (799,455 people were recorded as executed between 1921 and 1953 and the labour camp population reached 2.5 million at its peak) without engaging in an ideologically fuelled inflation game."

Milne contributed a foreword to Stasi State or Socialist Paradise (2015), a book by John Green and Bruni de la Motte about East Germany. In the Germany of Angela Merkel, the denunciation of the former state has become a "loyalty test for modern Germans." Milne asserted that the former communist state delivered "social and women's equality well ahead of its times, and greater freedom in the workplace than most employees enjoy in today's Germany." In 2009, Milne told George Galloway on the latter's The Mother of All Talk Shows, at that time broadcast on Talksport, that "East Berlin was absolutely at the front line of the cold war. That's what the Berlin Wall was. It was a front line between two social and military systems and two military alliances, and a very tense one at that. It wasn't just some kind of arbitrary division to hold people in, it was also a front line in a global conflict."

=== War on terror, Iraq wars, and the response ===
==== Afghanistan and Iraq wars ====
Milne has been a vocal critic of the war on terror, the wars in Afghanistan, and the Iraq War. In 2001, he argued that war in Afghanistan would fail to "stamp out anti-western terrorism", and if the United States invaded Iraq, "it risks a catastrophe." In relation to Iraq, Milne argued in March 2008: "Given that the invasion of Iraq was regarded as illegal by the majority of the UN security council, its secretary general, and the overwhelming weight of international legal opinion, it must by the same token be seen as a war crime: what the Nuremberg tribunal deemed the 'supreme international crime' of aggression. If it weren't for the fact that there is not the remotest prospect of any mechanism to apply international law to powerful states, Bush and Blair would be in the dock at The Hague."

According to Milne in July 2004, "the anti-occupation guerrillas" were "a classic resistance movement with widespread support waging an increasingly successful guerrilla war against the occupying armies." In October 2009, he argued for a "negotiated withdrawal" from Afghanistan based on a "political settlement, including the Taliban and regional powers." In a speech at a Stop the War Coalition rally on 4 October 2014, the day after Alan Henning is thought to have been beheaded, Milne said that "the horrific killing of the hostage Alan Henning in revenge for the British decision to bomb Iraq is a reminder, if any were needed, that another war in Iraq or Syria won't stop terror." He also said that "[t]he group that calls itself Islamic State is the ultimate blowback from the invasion of Iraq", calling it "the Frankenstein product of the War on Terror."

==== Motivations of al-Qaeda ====
Milne argued following the 7 July 2005 London bombings that it was "an insult to the dead" and a "piece of disinformation long peddled by champions of the occupations of Iraq and Afghanistan" to claim that al-Qaeda and its followers were motivated by "a hatred of western freedoms and way of life" and "that their Islamist ideology aims at global domination", rather than "the withdrawal of US and other western forces from the Arab and Muslim world" and an end to support for Israeli occupation of Palestinian land and despotic regimes in the region. Victor J. Seidler, a Professor of Social Theory from the University of London, argued in relation to Milne's article that we have to be careful "not to dismiss an Islamist rejection of the freedoms of Western urban cultures, in relation to consumerism and sexualities." Seidler argued that, contrary to Milne's claims, they were at least partly motivated by "Islamist religious doctrine."

Writing about Milne's articles on Muslim extremism, Andrew Anthony asserted that "whereas Milne can instantly detect the relationship between far right rhetoric and the recent murder of Ahmed Hassan, a Muslim teenager in Dewsbury, he dismisses the idea that such hatred as was captured in the Dispatches programme "Undercover Mosque" [in 2007] might contribute to the kind of mentality that resulted in the carnage of the July 2005 bombs and the many terror plots that the authorities have successfully prevented."

==== Gaza Wars ====
In the aftermath of the Gaza War (27 December 2008 – 18 January 2009), also known as Operation Cast Lead, Milne cited allegations of Israeli war crimes in arguing thus: "With such powerful evidence of violations of the rules of war now emerging from the rubble of Gaza, the test must be this: is the developing system of international accountability for war crimes only going to apply to the west's enemies – or can the western powers and their closest allies also be brought to book?" In a speech on 9 August 2014 at a Palestine Solidarity Campaign demonstration against the 2014 Israel–Gaza conflict, he said that "Israel has no right to defend itself from territories it illegally occupies. It only has an obligation to withdraw." He went on to say that "the Palestinians are an occupied people. They have the right to resist. They have the right to defend themselves from the occupier. It's not terrorism to fight back. The terrorism is the killing of citizens by Israel on an industrial scale that we have seen in the last month."

=== On Vladimir Putin and Russia ===
He attended the Valdai Discussion Club conference in Sochi, where he conducted a discussion in 2014 with Putin and former French prime minister Dominique de Villepin, opening a session there entitled "New Rules or No Rules in the Global Order", and his expenses were paid for by the organisers of the event.

On the annexation of Crimea by the Russian Federation in 2014, Milne wrote that "western aggression and lawless killing is on another scale entirely from anything Russia appears to have contemplated, let alone carried out – removing any credible basis for the US and its allies to rail against Russian transgressions", and has described the annexation as "clearly defensive", asserting that "the crisis in Ukraine is a product of the disastrous Versailles-style break-up of the Soviet Union in the early 1990s." Oliver Bullough, a journalist who formerly lived in Russia, disagreed with this view, asserting that "the destruction of the USSR was not some Versailles-style treaty imposed from outside. Russia, Ukraine and Belarus did it themselves." Cross-checking with the leak of 4,000 Russian emails, believed to originate from Putin's senior adviser Vladislav Surkov, the Conservative MP Bob Seely, and the Ukrainian specialist Alya Shandra, have found that several of Milne's articles on the Russo-Ukrainian War appear to parallel the Kremlin's agenda at the time. Bullough questioned Milne's view of Russia in general, explaining he had lived in Russia for six years, and had visited almost all the former Soviet bloc, adding that "when I read what Milne writes about it, I slip into a parallel universe."

In October 2015, Brian Whitaker, former Middle East editor for The Guardian, asserted that Milne "views international politics almost entirely through an anti-imperialist lens. That, in turn, leads to a sympathetic view of those dictatorial regimes which characterise themselves as anti-imperialist. It's the same with Islamist movements where they oppose western-backed regimes (Palestine, Egypt, Tunisia) though not necessarily in other cases such as Syria."

In October 2016, while serving as Corbyn's press spokesman, Milne said in response to protests outside the Russian embassy in London that the "focus on Russian atrocities or Syrian army atrocities I think sometimes diverts attention from other atrocities that are taking place."

== Personal life ==
Milne married Cristina Montanari, an Italian-born director of an advertising firm, in 1992. The couple have two now-adult children, a son and daughter, who were educated at selective grammar schools in Kingston upon Thames. In about 2013, Milne had a lung tumour removed.

== Publications ==
- Beyond the Casino Economy. With Nicholas Costello and Jonathan Michie. 1989. Verso Books. ISBN 0-86091-967-6.
- The Enemy Within: The Secret War Against the Miners. 1994, 1995, 2004, 2014. Verso Books/Macmillan Publishers. ISBN 0-86091-461-5.
- The Revenge of History: The Battle for the Twenty First Century. 2012, 2013. Verso Books. ISBN 978-1-7816-8091-9.
