= Kirsty Milne =

British journalist and academic (1964–2013)

- Born: 25 January 1964; Isleworth, Middlesex, England
- Died: 9 July 2013 (aged 49)
- Education: St Paul's Girls' School
- Alma mater: Magdalen College, Oxford
- Occupations: Journalist and academic
- Parent: Alasdair Milne (father)
- Relatives: Seumas Milne (brother)

Kirsty Mairi Milne (25 January 1964 – 9 July 2013) was a British journalist and academic.

== Early life and career ==
Kirsty Milne was born in Isleworth, Middlesex (now West London), to Alasdair Milne and his wife Sheila Graucob; the couple already had two sons, one of whom is Seumas Milne. The family moved to Lennoxtown, near Glasgow, in 1968 when her father became the controller of BBC Scotland, but returned to London when he was promoted in 1973 to become the BBC's Director of Programmes, Television. Milne was educated at St Paul's Girls' School and Magdalen College, Oxford, graduating with a first-class degree.

After a period as a trainee with the BBC, Milne gained her first high-profile job at the New Society magazine in 1987, a few months after her father had been sacked as the BBC's Director General, and continued on the staff of the New Statesman (for a time, the New Statesman and Society) after the two magazines merged. Remaining at the NS for about ten years, she eventually became the magazine's associate editor. During this period, she also freelanced for The Times and The Sunday Telegraph. Colleagues remembered her from this time, and subsequently, for insisting that her first name be pronounced as 'Keersty', rather than 'Kursty'.

== After 1999 ==
Milne had developed a strong affection for Scotland during the five years of her childhood spent there, and the establishment of the Scottish Parliament following the 1997 devolution referendum gave her an opportunity to return in 1999. She was briefly on the staff of the Sunday Herald in Glasgow, before joining The Scotsman in Edinburgh. According to an obituary by Iain Martin, who for a time was her editor at The Scotsman, Milne did not find the politics of devolution as interesting as she had expected, became interested in the green protest movement, and reported on developments in Westminster.

A change of course, to a career in academia, was in progress during the last decade of Milne's life. In 2003, she was awarded a Nieman Fellowship in journalism at Harvard University, her interests for research included "the implications of new protest movements and populist campaigns on politics and journalism", an appointment which she took up in 2004. At around the same time, she was a Fellow at Harvard's Centre for European Studies. Her research was drawn upon for Manufacturing Dissent, a pamphlet published by Demos in 2005.

She gained an MA in intellectual and cultural history, having been supervised at Queen Mary, University of London. A return to her Magdalen College, Oxford, followed in 2006 for her English DPhil on the change in the concept of Vanity Fair between John Bunyan's The Pilgrim's Progress and Thackeray's novel of 1847. She received her doctorate in 2009. She was awarded a Research Fellowship at Wolfson College, Oxford during the 2009–10 academic year, and had gained a Leverhulme Scholarship. Her doctoral thesis was published as a book by Cambridge University Press in May 2015, At Vanity Fair: From Bunyan to Thackeray.

Milne died of lung cancer, although she had never smoked. She had married the Scottish-born architect Hugh Shaw-Stewart in 2001, who survives her along with her two brothers. Her father died earlier in 2013.
