= The Land Trust =

British charity

The Land Trust is a British charity, based in Warrington, Cheshire, which owns or manages open spaces restored from derelict land for public benefit. Its vision is "to improve the quality of people’s lives by creating sustainable, high quality green spaces that deliver environmental, social and economic benefits".

The Land Restoration Trust was created in 2004 to ensure that restoration projects for derelict land would have a long-term future. It became independent as The Land Trust in 2009/10.

== Projects ==
As of May 2025 the Land Trust owns or manages more than 2,500 hectares (6,200 acres) in more than 86 spaces in England.

Spaces include:

- Northumberlandia, a land sculpture near Cramlington, Northumberland
- Phoenix Park, Thurnscoe, on the former Hickleton Main Colliery in South Yorkshire
- Braeburn Park, a nature reserve in London Borough of Bexley
