= The Enemy Within (Milne book) =

1994 book by Seumas Milne

The Enemy Within: The Secret War Against the Miners
- Cover of the first edition
- Author: Seumas Milne
- Language: English
- Subjects: British politics, 1984–1985 United Kingdom miners' strike, Premiership of Margaret Thatcher, MI5
- Published: 1994, 1995, 2004, 2014
- Publisher: Verso Books (1994, 2004, 2014), Pan Books (1995)
- Publication place: United Kingdom
- Media type: Print (Paperback)
- Pages: 445
- ISBN: 978-1-78168-342-2

The Enemy Within: The Secret War Against the Miners is a book by British journalist and writer Seumas Milne, first published in 1994. Updated editions were released in 1995, 2004, and 2014.

== Synopsis ==
The book investigates the circumstances surrounding the 1984–1985 United Kingdom miners' strike and the involvement of intelligence services in destroying the miners and the lengths the police, intelligence services and government went to in subverting public opinion. Verso Books stated: "In this 30th anniversary edition new material brings the story up to date with further revelations about the secret war against organised labour and political dissent."

== Reception ==
Owen Jones described the book as a "terrifying, frightening indictment of the British establishment" while Naomi Klein praised it as "[t]he definitive account of the strike—the best book on the Thatcher era". In The Irish Times, the book was commended as a "staggering journalistic investigation" with Joseph Crilly writing that "one can only allow one's head to swirl with a sense of the iniquity and the dishonesty involved". The book was also recommended by Red Pepper in which Huw Beynon described the book as a "classic" and wrote: "Through Seamus Milne's unique reporting into the dark side of the miners' strike, we can find roots of the repression that Britain continues to struggle with."
