= Goldthorpe United F.C. =

Goldthorpe United
- Full name: Goldthorpe United Football Club

Goldthorpe United F.C. was an English association football club based in Goldthorpe, South Yorkshire.

== History ==
Little is known of the club other than that it competed in the FA Cup in the 1920s and 1930s.

=== League and cup history ===
Goldthorpe United League and Cup history
Season	FA Cup
1927–28	2nd qualifying round
1929–30	2nd qualifying round
1930–31	3rd qualifying round
1931–32	1st qualifying round
1932–33	1st qualifying round
1933–34	Preliminary round
1934–35	1st qualifying round

== Records ==
- Best FA Cup performance: 3rd qualifying round, 1930–31
