= Michael Checkland =

British retired television executive (born 1936)

Sir Michael Checkland

11th Director-General of the BBC
- In office 1987–1992
- Preceded by: Alasdair Milne
- Succeeded by: Sir John Birt

Personal details
- Born: 13 March 1936 (age 90) Birmingham, West Midlands, England
- Education: King Edward VI Five Ways School
- Alma mater: Wadham College, Oxford

Sir Michael Checkland (born 13 March 1936) is a British retired television executive, who was Director-General of the BBC from 1987 to 1992, being appointed after the forced resignation of Alasdair Milne.

== Early life ==
Michael Checkland was educated at the state grammar school King Edward VI Five Ways in Birmingham, and Wadham College, Oxford, of which he was appointed an Honorary Fellow in 1989. After leaving Oxford he worked first as an auditor at Parkinson Cowan Ltd and then as an accountant at Thorn.

== Career at the BBC 1964–87 ==
Checkland joined the BBC in 1964 as a senior cost accountant and in 1969 he was promoted to be head of the Central Finance Unit and chief accountant for Central Finance Services. In 1971 he moved to BBC TV, where he was successively chief accountant (1971–76), financial controller (1976–77), controller of planning and resource management (1977–82), and director of resources (1982–85). He had meanwhile been a director of Visnews from 1980 until 1985. In 1985 he was appointed Deputy Director-General of the Corporation, and at the same time he became vice president of the Royal Television Society, a position he retained until 1994. In 1986 he became Chairman of BBC Enterprises, of which he had been a director since 1979. The following year he became Director-General upon the resignation of Alasdair Milne. This appointment coincided with a term of office as president of the Commonwealth Broadcasting Association until 1988.

== Director-General of the BBC ==
As a former BBC accountant (hence his somewhat derogatory nickname "Michael Chequebook" or "Chequebook Checkland") he was more cautious and less radical than Milne, and therefore much less unsettling to the Thatcher government. It has been claimed that the exodus to Channel 4 in the early 1990s of dramatists like Dennis Potter and Alan Bleasdale, who had both been responsible for series which caused outrage among Conservatives during the Milne era, had much to do with the relative lack of risk-taking at the BBC under Checkland and his successor John Birt, who was deputy director-general throughout Checkland's reign.

== After the BBC ==
Following his departure from the BBC, Checkland suggested at a Royal Television Society conference that the corporation's governors and the chairman Marmaduke Hussey had been out of touch: they thought, as he put it, that FM (as in FM radio) "stood for fuzzy monsters!"

Following his retirement from the BBC, Checkland became closely associated with the National Children's Homes charity. He has since become involved in a range of other charities and public bodies: Director of the National Youth Music Theatre (1992–2002), Chairman of the City of Birmingham Symphony Orchestra (1995–2001), Governor of Westminster College, Oxford (1993–97), Governor of Birkbeck College London (1993–97), Visiting Professor at the International Academy of Broadcasting, Montreux (1995–97), the Peabody Awards Board of Jurors (1994-2000), and Chairman of the Higher Education Funding Council for England (1997–2001).

In 1997–1998 he was served as vice-president of the Methodist Conference, the highest lay position in the Methodist Church of Great Britain.

Checkland is a trustee of Reuters, chairman of Horsham YMCA, chairman of Horsham Arts Festival, chairman of the University of Brighton and a board member of the Wales Millennium Centre. He was a member of the Independent Television Commission from 1997 to 2003, and chairman of Brighton Festival from 1993 to 2002.

Checkland now lives in Sussex and has three children and two grandchildren.

Media offices
Preceded by Alasdair Milne	Director-General of the BBC; 1987–1992	Succeeded by Sir John Birt
