= Alfred Young Nutt =

English architect and artist 1847–1924

Alfred Young Nutt, MVO, ISO (5 May 1847 – 25 July 1924) was an English architect and artist, who was Surveyor to the Dean and Canons of St George's Chapel, Windsor in the late 19th century.

== Early life ==
Alfred Young Nutt was born in 1847 in the small Leicestershire village of Burrough on the Hill, south-east of Melton Mowbray. He was the youngest of fifteen children to Reverend William Young Nutt, who was for thirty-five years curate of Burrough, and Rector of Cold Overton 1852 – 74.

Following an education at Oakham, Nutt took up an apprenticeship at an architectural practice in Leicester in 1861 where he remained for six years, during which time he was befriended by an artist called Harry Ward who later became a resident of Windsor. This connection led to Alfred taking up a position at the Office of Works of Windsor Castle in 1867 as a draughtsman.

== Work in Windsor ==
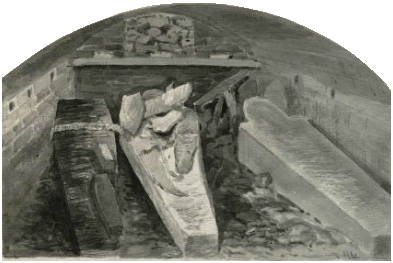
1888 sketch by Nutt of the vault under the choir, St George's Chapel, Windsor Castle showing coffins of King Henry VIII (centre, damaged), Queen Jane (right), King Charles I with a child of Queen Anne (left)

Given his junior status in the Office, much of Nutt's early work is not clearly attributable to him, but one early identifiable work was a detailed scaled drawing of the Royal Vault in St George's Chapel in preparation for major refurbishment work to be carried out by Sir George Gilbert Scott between 1870 and 1871.

It was this work which secured Nutt appointment as Surveyor to the Dean and Canons of St George's in 1873, having been rejected for the vacant post of Clerk of Works of Windsor Castle. In May 1898 The London Gazette announced his conformation in the post of Clerk of Works of Windsor Castle and he held the post concurrently with that of Chapel Surveyor, through annual reappointment, until his retirement in 1912.

== Later work ==
Nutt was commissioned to design and construct temporary annexes for Westminster Abbey for the coronations of both King Edward VII and King George V. For his service to the Coronation of King Edward VII and Queen Alexandra, he was invested as a Member (fifth class) of the Royal Victorian Order (MVO) two days after the ceremony, on 11 August 1902.

== Ecclesiastical projects ==
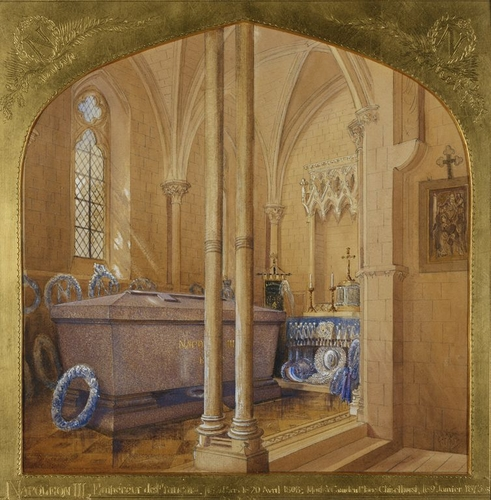
Tomb of Emperor Napoleon III at St Mary's Roman Catholic Church, Chislehurst, dated 1879

Nutt was a keen churchman and undertook several commissions for architectural work in the Church of England, many through contacts he had made during his time at Windsor. These varied from St John the Evangelist, Little Leighs, Essex, where Nutt undertook general restoration work (in particular, to the porch, chancel screen and pulpit) to the construction of England's first concrete church, St John and St Mary Magdalene in Goldthorpe, South Yorkshire on the commission of Lord Halifax.

== Community work and recognition ==
Nutt was renowned for his Christmas cards, which he designed himself, several of which are on display in the collection of the Windsor and Royal Borough Museum.

A blue plaque was unveiled on 16 April 2009 by the Mayor of Windsor and Maidenhead at Nutt's former residence at 63 King's Road, Windsor.
