= St John and St Mary Magdalene Church, Goldthorpe =

Coordinates: 53.535600°N 1.301920°W

The Church of St John the Evangelist and St Mary Magdalene
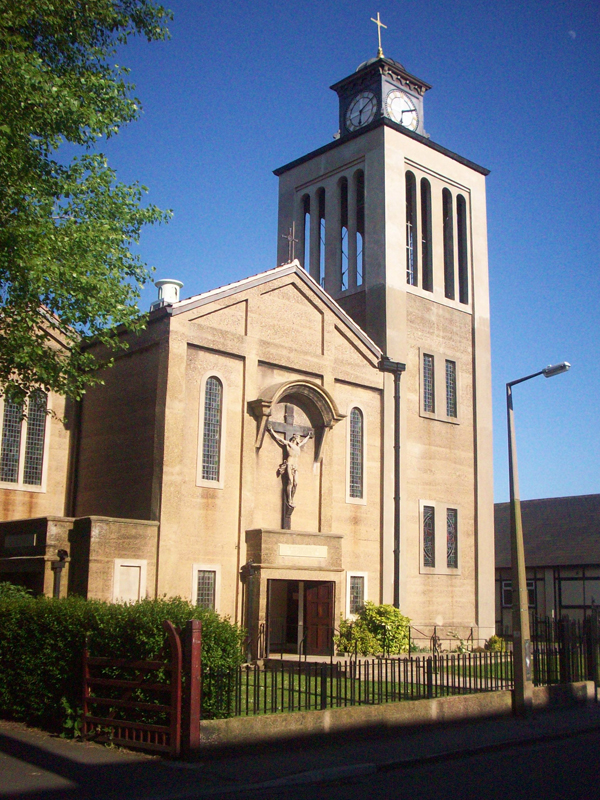
- The Church of St John the Evangelist and St Mary Magdalene
- OS grid reference: SE 46352 04559
- Denomination: Church of England
- Churchmanship: Anglo Catholic
- Website: Parish of Goldthorpe and Hickleton

History
- Dedication: St John the Evangelist and St Mary Magdalene

Architecture
- Architect: Alfred Young Nutt

Administration
- Province: York
- Diocese: Sheffield
- Parish: Goldthorpe

Clergy
- Bishop: Rt. Revd. Stephen Race SSC (AEO)
- Priest: Fr C. R. Schaefer SSC

St John the Evangelist and St Mary Magdalene Church is a parish church in the Church of England Diocese of Sheffield in Goldthorpe, near Barnsley, South Yorkshire, England.

== Background ==
The Church of St John the Evangelist and St Mary Magdalene, in Goldthorpe, near Barnsley, South Yorkshire, England was built in 1916. It is an early example of a ferro-concrete building and is now a Grade II listed building.

Commissioned by Charles Wood, 2nd Viscount Halifax, a former owner of Hickleton Hall, it was designed by Alfred Young Nutt in 1914. Nutt had been recently forcibly retired as Surveyor to the Dean and Canons of St George's Chapel, Windsor. Its strange Italian style is unique in this part of South Yorkshire and is distinctly odd for a Dearne Valley mining village.

It was the first large church in England to be built almost entirely in reinforced concrete, including all the principal internal furnishings within the church (which are of finely-finished concrete), the Presbytery, which is attached to the church, and even the boundary walls. The experimental nature of this construction, however, meant that the composition of the concrete allowed acidic water to leach through and rust the metal core of the walls. By the 1990s the church structure was showing significant signs of degradation and had to be substantially reinforced, with the Heritage Lottery Fund part-funding the repairs. The church was re-hallowed in June 2002.

== Interior ==
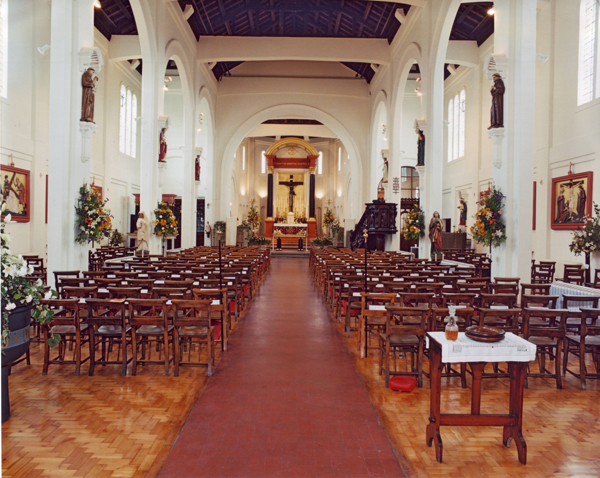
Interior of Ss John and Mary Magdalene, Goldthorpe

The Church consists of a South West Tower, Porch, West Gallery, Nave, North and South Aisles and a Chancel with Apse. There is a Lady Chapel on the south side of the chancel, with vestry on the North side.

Viscount Halifax was a prominent Anglo-Catholic layman and his taste in church adornment is reflected in the Italianate detailing, classical baldacchino altar canopy and simple Roman Catholic Basilica church plan with campanile. The baldacchino canopy is supported by four black pillars with gilded capitals, under which there is a large Crucifix in black with burnished halo - a copy of a work by Donatello.

The tower is a Venetian-styled campanile, above which there is a four faced clock, each face six feet in diameter. To the clock were attached bar-bell chimes which could be rung independently of the mechanism, but these fell into disuse and were removed in the 1950s.

According to Pevsner, the pulpit bought by the church in 1931 is 18th-century Flemish.

The church formerly had a chapel of ease dedicated to St Michael, based at the neighbouring village of Highgate. This was closed in 1983 and the altar and crucifix installed under the tower. In 2006 a stained glass window was installed commemorating the village's coal mining heritage.

== Lady Chapel ==
There is a side-chapel dedicated to St John and St Mary on the south-east corner of the church. During the refurbishment of the church in 2002, two pictures which hung above the altar were discovered to be works by Sienese master, Sano di Pietro. Valued at about £300,000, these were removed to the safe keeping of York Minster.

== Current use ==
The church is joined in pastoral care with St Wilfrid's Church, Hickleton.

== See also ==
- John the Evangelist
- Mary Magdalene
