= Horsham YMCA =

- Company type: Charitable organisation
- Founded: Horsham, West Sussex, England (1898)
- Headquarters: The Y Centre, Albion Way, Horsham, West Sussex, England

Horsham YMCA was founded in 1898 by a group of young Christian men to provide sporting activities for young people aged 16–25 in Horsham, England.
