= Hickleton Main Colliery =

Former coal mine in South Yorkshire, England

Coordinates: 53.5412°N 1.3069°W

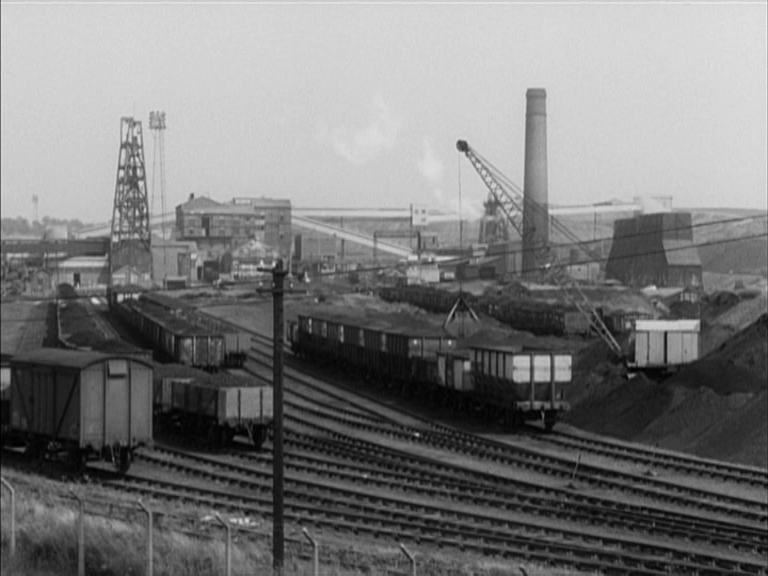
Hickleton Main Colliery 1967.jpg

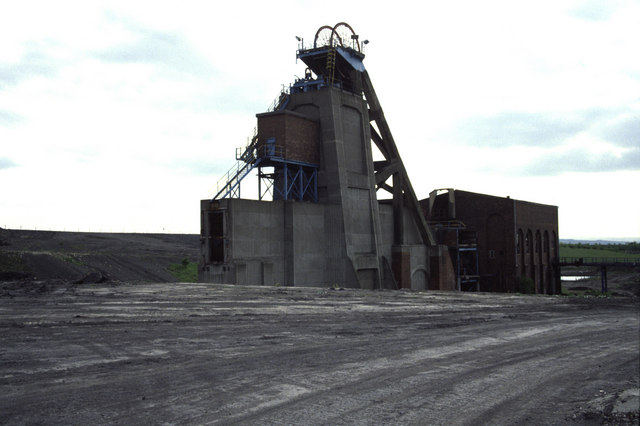
No. 3 shaft, seen in 1991

Hickleton Main Colliery was a coal mine in Thurnscoe, South Yorkshire, England from 1892 to 1988. In 1933 it employed 2,560 people underground and 500 on the surface. The coal mine's union lodge was the 400th recipient of the Order of Industrial Heroism.

On 9 February 1944, King George VI and Queen Elizabeth visited the colliery and thanked the miners for their war effort during World War II.

In 2006 a black granite memorial was erected in Thurnscoe cemetery bearing the names of the 161 miners who died at the pit over the years.

The site of the colliery now forms Phoenix Park in Thurnscoe.
