= Thurnscoe =

Village in South Yorkshire, England

Coordinates: 53.54598°N 1.31631°W

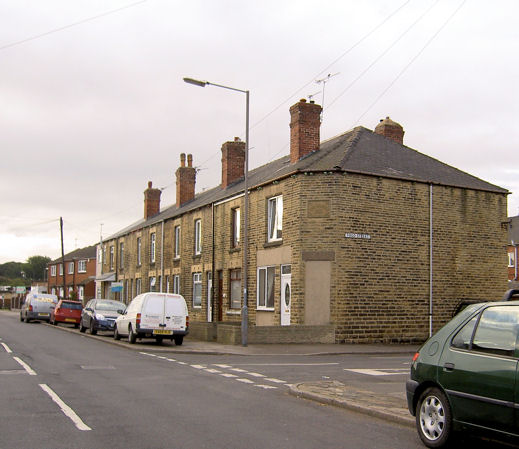
- Togo Street, Thurnscoe

- Location within South Yorkshire
- Population: 8,687 (2011 census)
- OS grid reference: SE454057
- Metropolitan borough: Barnsley
- Metropolitan county: South Yorkshire
- Region: Yorkshire and the Humber
- Country: England
- Sovereign state: United Kingdom
- Post town: ROTHERHAM
- Postcode district: S63
- Dialling code: 01709
- Police: South Yorkshire
- Fire: South Yorkshire
- Ambulance: Yorkshire
- UK Parliament: Wentworth and Dearne

Thurnscoe is a village in the Metropolitan Borough of Barnsley in South Yorkshire, England. The village falls within the Dearne North ward of the Barnsley Metropolitan Borough Council, and along with Goldthorpe and Bolton upon Dearne is part of the Dearne Towns. Historically within the West Riding of Yorkshire, the village is approximately 8.5 miles (14 km) from Barnsley and 8.5 miles (14 km) from Doncaster. It is served by Thurnscoe railway station with bus links provided by Stagecoach Yorkshire. In 2011, it had a population of 8,687.

== History ==
Set in the heart of the Dearne Valley, historically, Thurnscoe was a farming village and in Roman times it was situated on the Roman road Ryknild Street, which ran down a track, (known locally as "the cow track" as it was the route for the dairy herds until the farm closed in recent years), to the east of what is now Rectory Lane. It continues up Southfield Lane by the side of the cemetery and over fields to the south of the village, and up Clayton Lane to the north. Thurnscoe was known in early times as Turnesc, this becoming Terunsc by the time of its mention in the Domesday Book, with the name Thurnscoe is derived from Old Norse for Thorn Tree Wood. Parts of the village were owned by Roche Abbey, who dug Magnesian Limestone in an area known locally as "Cave Wood" which is a craggy geography between the overlying Cadeby Formation and underlying Yellow Sands Formation, both late Permian. Cadeby limestone from Thurnscoe was a moderately significant export in medieval times.

Thurnscoe's oldest building is the Church of St. Helen on High Street, built in 812 by the Angles and rebuilt in 1087 by the Normans though only the tower of the original structure remains. Excavations during renovation work (under the former Rector, John Hall) on the church revealed Anglo-Saxon remains, including a skeleton, indicating that it was used as a sacred site before the Christian church was established here. The western side of the village has more history to it, including Thurnscoe Hall (now a nursing home) and the 1715 Blacksmith's Cottage near St Helen's Church. Red House Cottage on High Street is the oldest building in the village dating back to the 16th century. Before the mines opened, Thurnscoe was once a wealthy farming community, famous in the Middle Ages for the quality of its cheese. There were a number of historic farms and arable and livestock fields all around the village, but most of the farms have now gone and most of the fields have been covered by modern housing. The historic Thurnscoe Hall, a Grade II listed 17th-century country house, stands on the High Street and remains as a survivor of this pre-industrial era.

In 1931, the civil parish had a population of 10,548. Thurnscoe became an urban district in 1908 which contained the parish. On 1 April 1937 the parish and urban district were abolished and merged with Dearne.

=== Mining years and after ===
Mining began in the 17th century from small surface mines (Benson and Neville 1976) but exploded along with the population after Hickleton Main Colliery found the Barnsley seam in 1894. Almost the entire of the village east of the railway was built to accommodate the coal miners, including St. Hilda's Church in 1935 (deconsecrated 2017). In 1980 mining accounted for 81% of all male employment in the area. It was one of many mining villages in the Yorkshire coalfield that suffered high levels of unemployment when the British coal mining industry was restructured in the 1980s. Hickleton Colliery was merged with Goldthorpe in 1986 before that too was closed in 1994.

From 1983 to 1986, Thurnscoe was one of four areas in South Yorkshire where the Probation Service ran a victim/offender mediation project (one of the first of its kind in the country).

The main pit waste tip has been landscaped and converted, with the aid of the environmental body Groundwork, into "Phoenix Park" which contains a climbing wall, picnic areas and many pieces of art which were developed by and in conjunction with the local community. Poems by local resident Desiree Chipp are carved into three at the entrances to the site. There is a small car park accessible off Lidget Lane. Towards the end of the 20th century many of the historic buildings have been demolished, including the Victorian primary and infant schools, the Station Hotel (which had an inn sign which was featured on a Royal Mail postage stamp) and Broadway Buildings Ballroom. The village once also had a swimming baths, cinema and an active market, the former site of the market eventually was replaced with a car park for the village's Home Bargains store, which opened in 2017.

A series of character areas are being created, defined by housing type and form, and set within an overall master planning strategy to ensure the development of an integrated neighbourhood. The project started on site in early 2010.

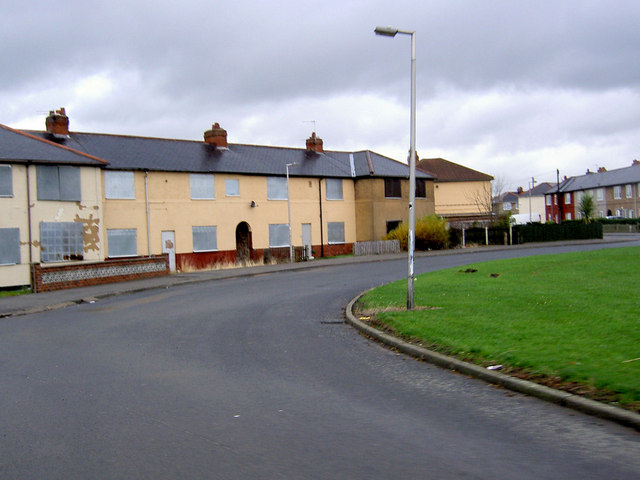
Houses awaiting demolition in Thurscoe (seen in 2007). Many former council and National Coal Board houses in Thurnscoe have been demolished

Some new social housing was built on the redeveloped site of the old colliery buildings adjacent to the former colliery officers' club. The total investment for the scheme is £2.1 million which also includes environmental works to improve the boundary wall to the social club and to upgrade the access to the public open space adjacent to the site.

A brook which runs through the western extent, travelling under the village in a culvert, flooded during the gales and heavy rain of 1987, briefly threatening the local primary school, Gooseacre, and flooding several homes along Merrill Road. Litter from the school was stated to be the cause of the flood, and a grille was installed on the brook's culvert entrance. Council records show that the water table is very close to the surface in Thurnscoe, as little as 18 inches below the surface in parts. This has led to local concerns about the building of new houses over the green areas of the village and resulted in a petition against this in 2007. Another flood on 26 June 2007 flooded Houghton Road outside the Thurnscoe Hotel and burst the banks of all the dykes in Thurnscoe. Merrill Road was once again flooded and it flooded as far as Westfield Crescent. In parts of Thurnscoe the water was up to waist level. Also the road between Thurnscoe and Great Houghton was flooded severely. Dearnlea Old People's home on Welfare Road had to be evacuated.

== Geography and environment ==
Thurnscoe's geography is characteristic of glacial moraine, with gentle inclines, good arable clay/loam soil and no irregular boulders. The village was once known for its numerous springs and dykes. High Street (which is not the main road) is a meandering residential street which was once a river. Many of the dykes were enclosed into pipelines during the 1960s and 1970s as flooding had traditionally been a problem in the lower part of the village.

The village is bisected, east/west, by a railway, originally laid to serve the colliery, into Thurnscoe and Thurnscoe East. The residents do not consider the two to be separate villages. Locals refer to Thurnscoe East as "the top end". The eastern half is characterised by low cost terraced housing (built to serve the former colliery) and a small business park on the site of the former colliery. The western side of the village is also known as "Old Thurnscoe", or "the bottom end" by locals from the "top end".

== Sports ==
Thurnscoe Park Avenue F.C. competed in the FA Cup from 1919 to 1921, and Thurnscoe Victoria F.C. competed in the same competition during the 1930s and 1940s. Thurnscoe is also home to Thurnscoe Institute Cricket Club, and a sports ground near the village's Asda supermarket.

== Notable people ==
- Billy Whitehurst, former Hull City and Newcastle United striker, was born in the village.
- Leonard Parkin (1929–1993), Journalist and newscaster on ITN’s News at One and News at 5:45. Originally with the BBC.

== See also ==
- Listed buildings in Dearne North
