= Alasdair Milne =

British television producer and executive (1930–2013)

10th Director-General of the BBC
- In office 1982 – January 1987
- Preceded by: Ian Trethowan
- Succeeded by: Michael Checkland

Personal details
- Born: Alasdair David Gordon Milne; 8 October 1930 British India
- Died: 8 January 2013 (aged 82) London, England
- Spouse: Sheila Graucob (m. 1954; died 1992)
- Children: 3, including Seumas and Kirsty
- Education: New College, Oxford
- Occupation: Television producer and controller

Alasdair David Gordon Milne (8 October 1930 – 8 January 2013) was a British television producer and executive. He had a long career at the BBC, where he was eventually promoted to Director-General, and was described by The Independent as "one of the most original and talented programme-makers to emerge during television's formative years".

In his early career, Milne was a BBC producer and was involved in founding the current affairs series Tonight in 1957. Later, after a period outside the BBC, he became controller of BBC Scotland and BBC Television's director of programmes. He served as Director-General of the BBC between July 1982 and January 1987, when he was forced to resign from his post by the BBC Governors following several difficult years for the BBC, which included sustained pressure from the Thatcher government about editorial decisions which had proved controversial.

== Early life ==
Milne was born in British India to Charles Gordon Shaw Milne, an Aberdonian surgeon, and his wife, Edith Reid (née Clark), the daughter of a headmaster of George Heriot's School. He would spend the first six years living with his maternal grandparents in Morningside, Edinburgh, until his father returned and they moved to Kent. He would go on to study at Winchester College and New College, Oxford.

== Career ==
For his national service Milne was commissioned into the Gordon Highlanders, before receiving a medical discharge due to a lung infection. He joined the BBC in September 1954 as a graduate trainee after his wife spotted a BBC advertisement. He was taken under the wing of Grace Wyndham Goldie who recruited, trained, guided and encouraged many well-known BBC broadcasters and current affairs executives. Milne was one of the so-called "Goldie Boys", a group of producers and presenters, which included Huw Wheldon, Robin Day, David Frost, Cliff Michelmore, Ian Trethowan and Richard Dimbleby.

Milne was the first television producer to become Director-General. His background was in current affairs and he was a founder producer of Tonight, and became the programme's editor in 1961. He also worked on programmes such as That Was the Week That Was, one of the most controversial programmes of the 1960s, and The Great War. He was instrumental in bringing the entire Shakespeare canon to television, as well as one of the BBC's most acute comedies, Yes Minister. He would also set up BBC Scotland, when as the appointed controller in January 1968, he decided to change the lettering on the front of the building from 'BBC' to 'BBC Scotland'. According to The Herald:

"He campaigned for BBC Scotland to make programmes reflecting Scottish values and culture, believing in its obligation to support the Gaelic language"

Landmark broadcasting events during his time as Director-General included Live Aid, the massive music event precipitated by a BBC news report on famine in Africa. The BBC's new Breakfast Time programme went on air on 17 January 1983, presented by Frank Bough and former ITN newscaster Selina Scott. Milne was full of praise for the show, saying: "It was a terrific start. The first Tonight programme was not as good as this."

As Director-General, Milne was involved with a series of controversies with the British government. Contentious programme-making included the Nationwide general election special with Margaret Thatcher in 1983, the coverage of the miners' strike of 1984–85, the Panorama libel action, (Note: On 30 January 1984, Panorama broadcast "Maggie's Militant Tendency", the Real Lives fracas,. (Note: The Real Lives episode "At the Edge of the Union" included an interview with Martin McGuiness, and Milne and the BBC Governors initially prevented it from being broadcast following government complaints. It was eventually shown in October 1985.) Neil Hamilton sued for libel, the BBC settled out of court.) the reporting of the U.S. bombing of Libya and the controversy surrounding the programme Secret Society which took place in light of MI5's vetting of BBC employees.

On top of this, Milne had to defend the existence of the BBC to the Peacock Committee, which was considering the future of the BBC. Milne defended the television licence thus:

"The licence fee itself has some flaws of which we have been aware for many years, but whose virtues greatly outstrip its flaws. The licence fee is a form of hypothecated tax and, yes, it is regressive and burdens old age pensioners (who amount to one-third of all licence fee holders and who are the heaviest users of the available service), it is compulsory and, paid as a single annual payment, amounts to a good deal of money. On the other hand, it does amount to the best bargain in Britain, a slogan which is truer than any single advertising claim I can think of: it is by far the cheapest form of paying for a high standard of broadcasting."

The licence fee survived the negotiations, and the BBC made an expensive and failed attempt to enter satellite broadcasting.

== Resignation ==
In September 1986, Marmaduke Hussey was appointed chairman of the BBC Governors. Perceived as being Margaret Thatcher's "hatchet man", he was accused of having been appointed because of her perception that the corporation was biased towards the left. In an unprecedented step, Hussey convinced the Board of Governors that a change of direction was needed, and they forced Milne's resignation.

Milne wrote:

"Patricia Hodgson, the Secretary, asked me if I would go and see the chairman. I thought it odd that she addressed me by my Christian name; everybody else did, but for some reason she had never done so before. When I walked into Hussey's office, Barnett and he were both there. I remember the blinds were drawn against the sun which was brilliant that morning. Hussey's lip trembled as he said: 'I am afraid this is going to be a very unpleasant interview. We want you to leave immediately. It's a unanimous decision of the Board."

Milne, who later described the governors as a "bunch of amateurs", resigned in January 1987. The New York Times reported on 30 January 1987, "Mr. Milne, who became director general in 1982, resigned during a meeting of the board of governors and left without issuing a statement. The BBC said his deputy, Michael Checkland, had taken over temporarily."

== Post-resignation comments about the BBC ==
Milne was strongly critical of later BBC Director-General John Birt whom he called "blue skies Birt". Milne described Birt's thesis on television's so-called 'bias against understanding' as "balls, actually", and said:

"[Birt is] the most graceless man I have ever known. Ghastly man".

In October 2004, stories were published implying that he had suggested that alleged dumbing down of the BBC was partly the consequence of the corporation's growing number of female executives:

"Too many dumb, dumb, dumb cookery and gardening shows... I have nothing against women. I've worked with them all my life. It just seems to me that the television service has largely been run by women for the last four to five years and they don't seem to have done a great job of work."

Milne later clarified his position:

"What I actually said was that the three people who had run the television service for the past four or five years had not, it seemed to me, done a marvellous job. I would have said the same if they had been mice or men. They happened to be women and then I was stitched up by The Times."

In 2006, at a private gathering at the Royal Television Society, Milne, when asked about Marmaduke Hussey, who fired him, said: "What can I say about Hussey? Not a lot." In his own career he was proudest of programmes such as Tonight, That Was the Week That Was and the historical series The Great War. He had thought he would find something else to do [after resigning in 1987] but it never happened. "So I decided to go and spend the summer fishing and the winter shooting in beloved Scotland and wrap up that end of my life," he said.

== Personal life ==
In 1954 Milne married Ann Ruth Sheila Eva Kirsten Graucob in Oxford. Graucob, who was of Danish and Irish ancestry, died on 1 April 1992. The couple had two sons, Ruairidh and Seumas and a daughter, Kirsty, who died in July 2013.

== Death ==
Milne died on 8 January 2013 at age 82 after suffering from a series of strokes. His obituary in The Guardian noted "...Yet his term as director general ended prematurely, in January 1987, when he resigned to avoid the ignominy of being sacked. The ostensible cause was a succession of public gaffes by the BBC in 1985–86, plus a costly out-of-court libel settlement over a 1984 edition of Panorama, all of which Tory ministers, the Times, the Daily Mail and others were able to exploit." The BBC noted "Milne's time as director general was marked by clashes with Margaret Thatcher's Conservative government" adding "...he strongly defended the BBC's independence and it flourished creatively, with the launch of breakfast television, Newsnight and EastEnders, and the Live Aid concert broadcast."

The Independent remarked "Alasdair Milne is destined to be remembered for the brutal manner of his dismissal as Director-General of the BBC in 1987, during Margaret Thatcher's drive to purge the corporation of what she saw as its indiscipline, extravagance, irresponsibility and anti-Conservative bias." noting his contributions "...In 1962 Milne and [Donald] Baverstock were involved in another ground-breaking experiment. With Ned Sherrin they created That Was The Week That Was, the BBC's first attempt at regular political satire. "

Of Milne's appointment at the BBC, Variety observed "From the moment Milne was appointed as the pubcaster's director general in 1981, he had to battle to defend its editorial independence. At the time, the UK was engaged in a war with Argentina, and government supporters felt the BBC should support the "home" team rather than report on the conflict from a neutral perspective."

== See also ==
- Board of Governors of the BBC
- Politics of the United Kingdom
- Zircon affair

== Publications ==
- DG: The Memoirs of a British Broadcaster, 1988.

Media offices
Preceded by Ian Trethowan	Director-General of the BBC; 1982–1987	Succeeded by Michael Checkland
