= Ian Trethowan =

British journalist, broadcaster and administrator (1922–1990)

Sir Ian Trethowan

9th Director-General of the BBC
- In office 1977–1982
- Preceded by: Sir Charles Curran
- Succeeded by: Alasdair Milne

Personal details
- Born: James Ian Raley Trethowan; 20 October 1922 High Wycombe, Buckinghamshire, England
- Died: 12 December 1990 (aged 68) London, England
- Education: Christ's Hospital
- Occupation: Political journalist, radio and television presenter

Sir James Ian Raley Trethowan (20 October 1922 – 12 December 1990) was a British journalist, radio and television broadcaster and administrator who eventually became Director-General of the BBC from 1 October 1977 to 31 July 1982, having previously been managing director of BBC network radio from 1970 to 1976.

== Early life and education ==
Son of Major James Jackson Raley Trethowan (1893-1974), of 6, Ashleigh Court, Surbiton, Surrey, formerly of High Wycombe, Buckinghamshire, MBE, a retired officer of the York and Lancaster Regiment who worked in business, army welfare, and sports writing for the Sunday papers (including the Sunday Times, Evening Standard, and Yorkshire Post), after leaving the Army, and his first wife, Winifred, née Timms, Trethowan was educated at the independent Christ's Hospital school near Horsham in West Sussex.

== Career ==
Trethowan started work as a journalist and parliamentary lobby correspondent. He became a presenter for Independent Television News in the late 1950s and early 1960s, co-presenting ITN's coverage of the 1959 general election.

He moved to the BBC in about 1963, and was part of Grace Wyndham Goldie's group of heavy hitting journalists which included Richard Dimbleby and Robin Day. Trethowan was a regular presenter of political programmes such as Gallery, Panorama and general election and budget specials. He presented the BBC's tribute programme to President John F. Kennedy on the day of his assassination.

A Conservative, and a close friend of the former prime minister Sir Edward Heath, Trethowan has been criticised for his support of the Security Service "vetting" of BBC employees which has often been seen as a means of weeding out leftists in the corporation. Trethowan allowed MI5 to remove half the content from a Panorama documentary made by BBC journalist Tom Mangold, this emerged in December 2011, when 30-year-old British government papers were released. Trethowan told the press at the time that nobody from the government had seen the film or put pressure on the BBC but in fact he had met the heads of Security Service (MI5) and the Secret Intelligence Service (MI6), shown them a tape of the programme and invited them to suggest cuts to it. The programme-makers defended their programme and, although changes were made, the transmitted version still annoyed the intelligence agencies. However, his genuflection to those in power ensured that his five years in charge of the BBC were generally very stable and secure for the organisation.

Cautious and conservative-minded, he was responsible for the sacking of Kenny Everett from Radio 1 in 1970 for making a joke suggesting that the wife of John Peyton, the transport minister in the Conservative government, had only passed her driving test because she had "slipped the examiner a fiver".

In 1979, when Trethowan was Director-General, the BBC governors scuppered a plan to broadcast Michael Parkinson's chat show three nights a week, probably because the idea seemed too populist.

Trethowan's final months at the BBC saw the Thatcher government dissatisfied with what it saw as the corporation's insufficiently patriotic coverage of the Falklands War. From 1987 until his death from motor neurone disease, he was chairman of Thames Television. He received an Honorary Doctor of Civil Law degree from the University of East Anglia in July 1979. Trethowan was made a Knight Bachelor in the 1980 Birthday Honours. He died at Cromwell Hospital, London on the night of 12 December 1990. A memorial service for Trethowan was held at St Martin-in-the-Fields on 5 March 1991.

In 1994, when announcing her plans to reduce the dominance of received pronunciation and include more regional accents on Radio 3 and Radio 4, Liz Forgan (who then held Trethowan's old post as managing director of BBC network radio) said that she wanted to move away from the attitude she said he had expressed when he heard a Birmingham accent on BBC radio and said "What is that sound doing on the BBC? Get it off."

Media offices
Preceded by Charles Curran	Director-General of the BBC; 1977–1982	Succeeded by Alasdair Milne
