= Goldthorpe =

Village in South Yorkshire, England

Coordinates: 53.53°N 1.30°W

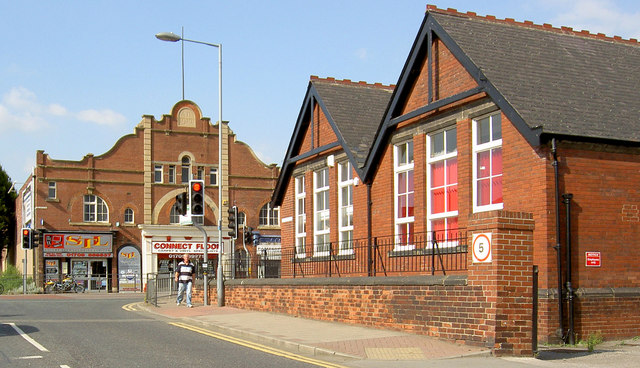
- Goldthorpe centre

- Location within South Yorkshire
- Population: 6,051 (2011 Census)
- Metropolitan borough: Barnsley
- Metropolitan county: South Yorkshire
- Region: Yorkshire and the Humber
- Country: England
- Sovereign state: United Kingdom
- Post town: ROTHERHAM
- Postcode district: S63
- Dialling code: 01709
- Police: South Yorkshire
- Fire: South Yorkshire
- Ambulance: Yorkshire
- UK Parliament: Wentworth and Dearne

Goldthorpe is a village in the Metropolitan Borough of Barnsley, in South Yorkshire, England. Historically part of the West Riding of Yorkshire. It was anciently a small medieval farming village, Goldthorpe is recorded in the Domesday Book as part of the Manor of Bolton upon Dearne which was once owned by Roger de Busli. The town is split between the Dearne North and South wards of Barnsley MBC and had a population of 6,051 at the 2011 Census.

== History ==
Early prehistoric pottery, a flint flake, Bronze Age cremation sites and Romano-British ditches and field systems have been found in the Goldthorpe area suggesting ancient occupation of the area over a long period of time.

In the early 18th century, Barnsley Attorney William Henry Marsden Esquire of Burntwood Hall bought the Manor of Bolton on Dearne with Goldthorpe for £10,000 including over 1,000 acres (4.0 km^{2}) of land. Goldthorpe is recorded in the 1761–1767 Inclosure Awards. The Marsden family held the manor until 1815.

St John and St Mary Magdalene Church, Goldthorpe, built in 1916, is an early example of a ferro-concrete building. According to Nikolaus Pevsner, the pulpit bought by the church in 1931 is 18th-century Flemish.

Goldthorp, Goldthorpe, Gouldthorpe and all variations of this surname, derive from this placename. A marriage took place in 1361, when Robert de Goldthorpe alias Robertson, son of Robert Lord of the Manor of Goldthorpe married Esabul de Shepley daughter of William de Shepley, half heiress with her sister Dionyssia to the Manor of Shepley. Descendants with the surname Goldthorpe were the major land owners for almost 200 years, until the final heir sold the land and left the area. Cadet branches remained in the Huddersfield area for many centuries mainly as wool weavers.

The significant industry in the area for much of the 19th and 20th century was coal mining. This ended in the immediate area in 1994 with the closure of Goldthorpe Colliery. The 1984-85 Miners' Strike affected the area significantly. In 1984 two teenage boys had died in Goldthorpe while collecting coal during the strike; a memorial to them was built in 2011.

== Economy ==
The area is now commonly referred to as the Dearne Valley and was a major coal mining area. There is a small industrial estate to the north of the village but in the absence of new industries the area had become deprived this is now changing due to the councils regeneration plan. The village is connected to areas of wider employment such as Doncaster and Barnsley by public transport.

There have been attempts to regenerate the village in the twenty first century. In the 2010s several residential streets are part of the village centre were demolished and a new school constructed. Regeneration proposals have been made for Co-operative Street which has now been knocked down as the redevelopment comes along. The village was plagued by many abandoned houses which had become unlettable and were often in states of dereliction, however the local council have ok a new Investment Plan projects 1, 2 and 3 provide a programme of investment that will unlock the development of a major employment growth opportunity in the Dearne Valley ultimately facilitating the long-term commercial development of the entire area this is on-going along with murals and new artwork around the town and a new gateway roundabout (now completed) where the commercial development is to take place

== Facilities ==
Goldthorpe railway station opened in 1988 on the Wakefield Line, with services to Leeds, Wakefield Westgate, Rotherham, Meadowhall and Sheffield.

Goldthorpe Library is a modern building (the previous library having been burnt down in an arson attack) in the middle of the town.

In the 2010s the village centre of Goldthorpe was remodelled. The shops to the eastern end of the centre were replaced with Dearne Goldthorpe Primary School. The market area on Market Street was also closed and is now housing. The remaining parts of the centre along the western section of Doncaster Road have been refurbished with new flagged pedestrian pavements.

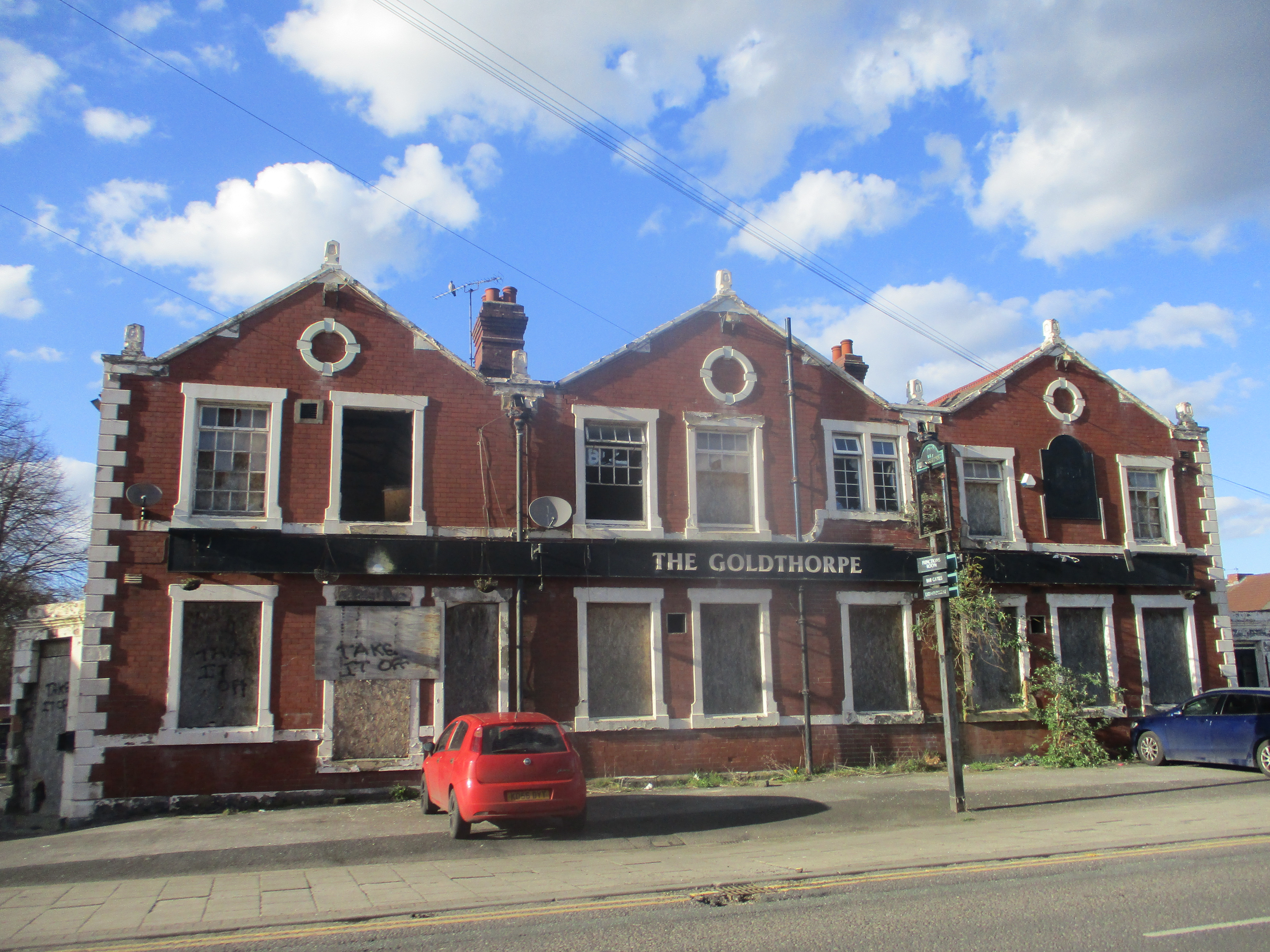
The former Goldthorpe pub now lies in a state of dereliction

There were two banks in Goldthorpe; a NatWest and a Yorkshire Bank, the latter of which has now been converted into a pub; The New Bank. There are three working men's clubs; Goldthorpe Reform Working Men's Club, The Golden Nugget Working Men's Club and the Union Jack Memorial Club. There were previously two other pubs; the Horse and Groom which has since been demolished and The Goldthorpe which has also been demolished.

There are two supermarkets; an Aldi and an Asda. There was previously a Co-op supermarket on Doncaster Road but this has since closed.

== Schools ==
The main secondary school in the area is Astrea Academy Dearne, a school that caters for around 1,300 pupils aged 11–16 years. There are three main primary schools: Dearne Goldthorpe Primary School (3–11, community school), Dearne Highgate Primary School (3–11, community school) and Sacred Heart Catholic Primary School (3–11, voluntary aided school).

== Sports ==
Goldthorpe was represented in the FA Cup during the 1920s and 1930s by Goldthorpe United F.C. Goldthorpe is home to Dearne CC, a cricket club established in 1926 and currently playing in Division 5 of the South Yorkshire Senior Cricket League.

== Notable residents ==
- The actor Brian Blessed once lived on Probert Avenue in Goldthorpe.

== Gallery ==
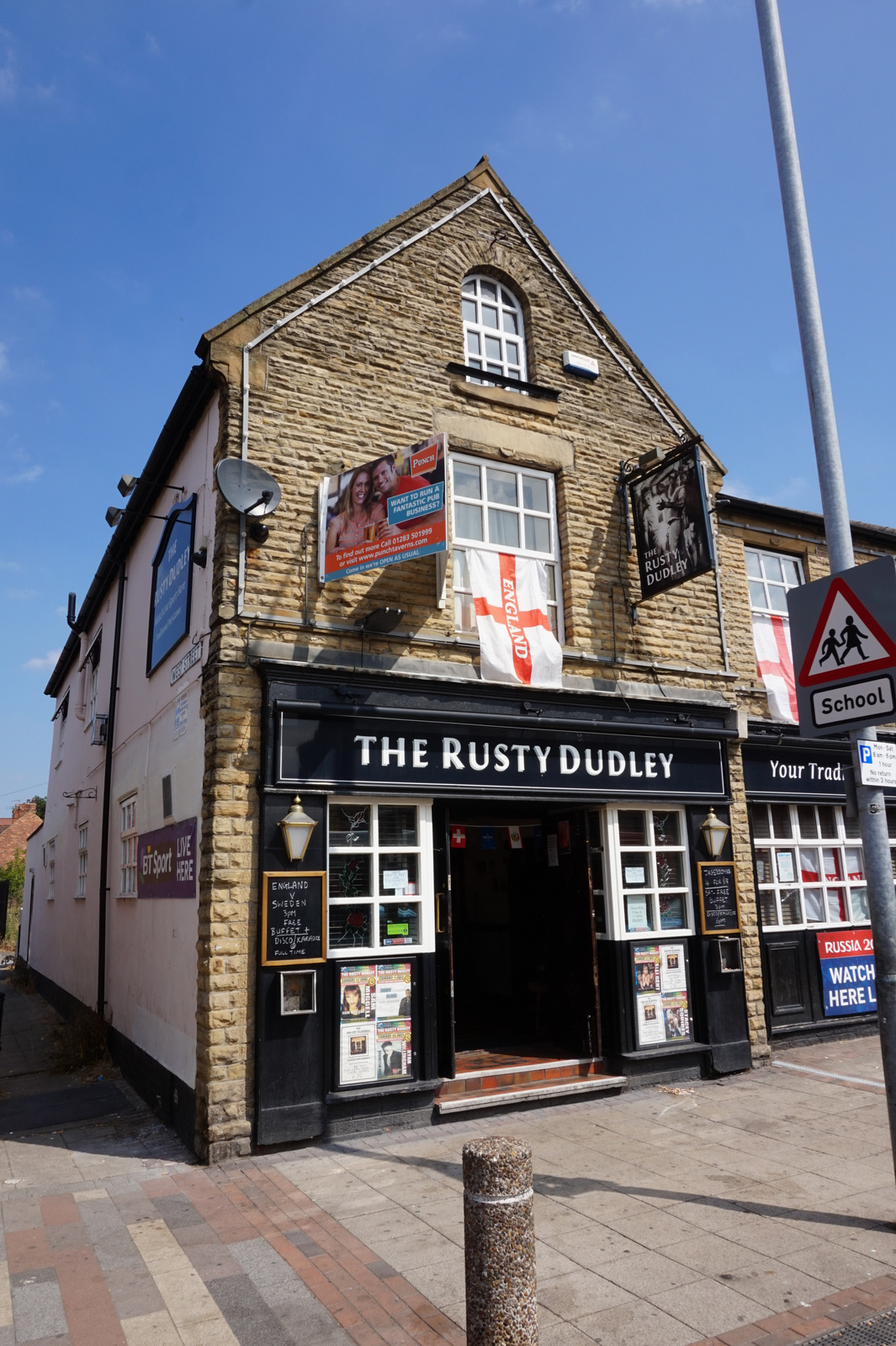
The Rusty Dudley

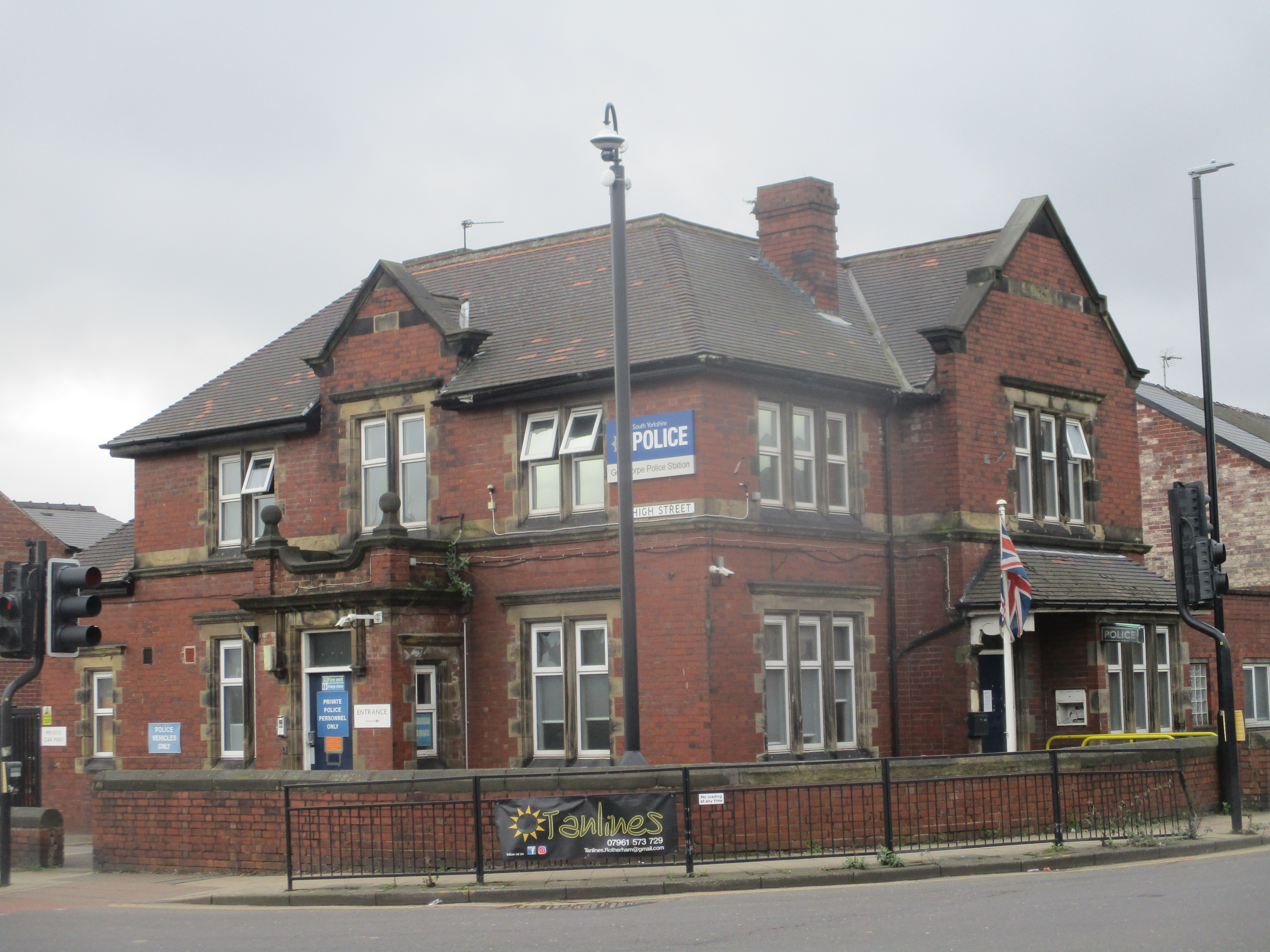
Goldthorpe police station

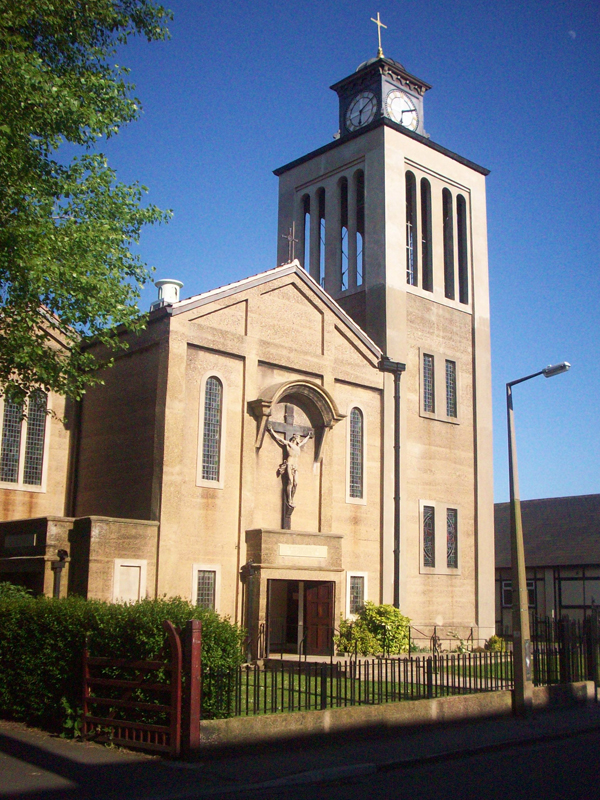
St John and St Mary Magdalene Church, Goldthorpe

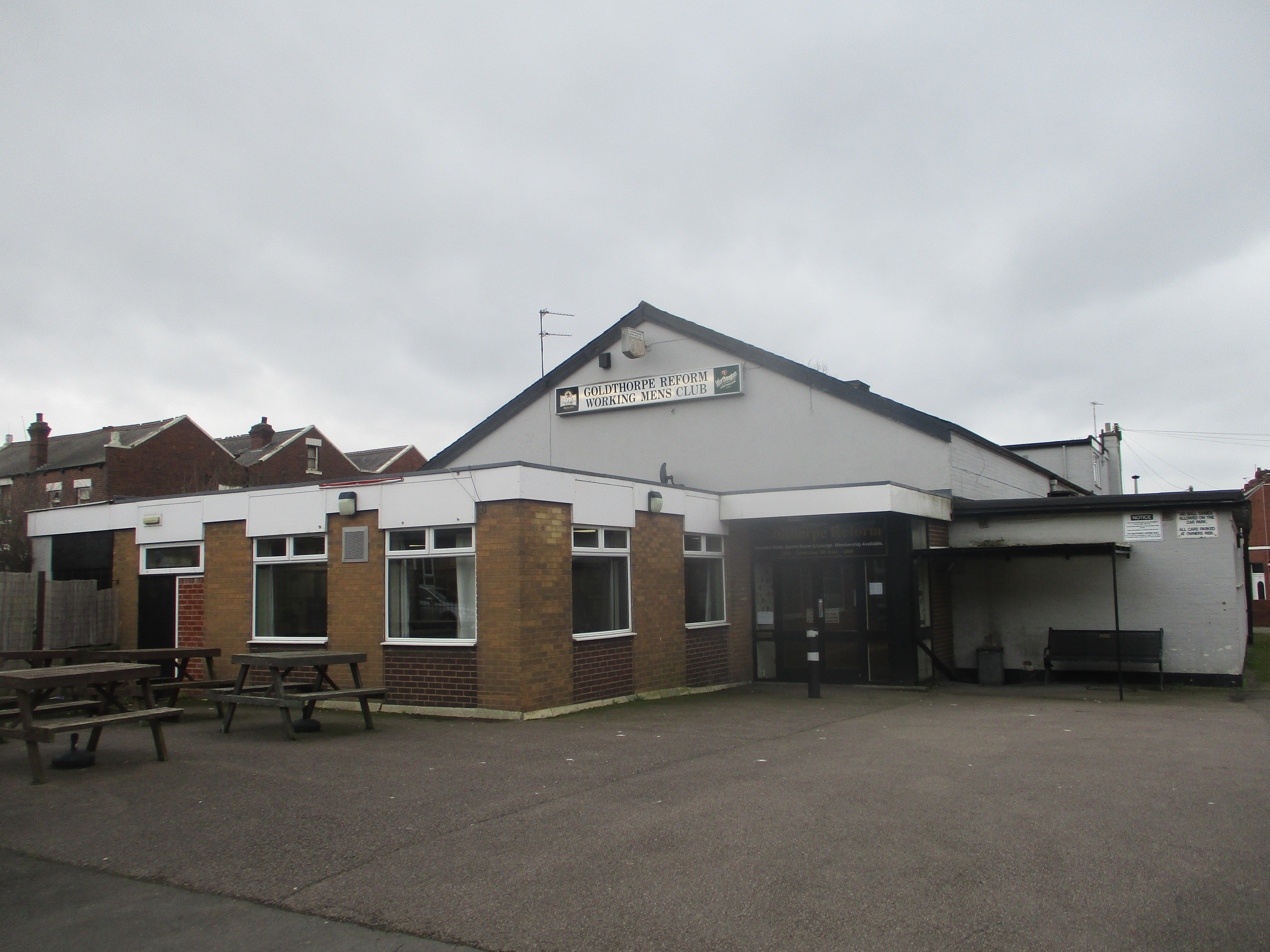
Goldthorpe Reform Working Mens' Club

== See also ==
- List of Yorkshire pits
- Listed buildings in Dearne North
