= Skeletonizer =

Several moth species are known as skeletonizers, including:

- Aglaope infausta (almond-tree leaf skeletonizer moth)
- Bucculatrix ainsliella (oak leaf skeletonizer, oak skeletonizer)
- Bucculatrix albertiella (oak-ribber skeletonizer)
- Bucculatrix canadensisella (birch skeletonizer)
- Catastega aceriella (maple trumpet skeletonizer moth)
- Choreutis nemorana (fig-tree skeletonizer moth, fig leaf roller)
- Choreutis pariana (apple-and-thorn skeletonizer, apple leaf skeletonizer)
- Harrisina americana (grapeleaf skeletonizer)
- Harrisina metallica (western grapeleaf skeletonizer)
- Prochoreutis inflatella (skullcap skeletonizer moth)
- Schreckensteinia festaliella (blackberry skeletonizer)

== See also ==
- Skeletonization (disambiguation)
