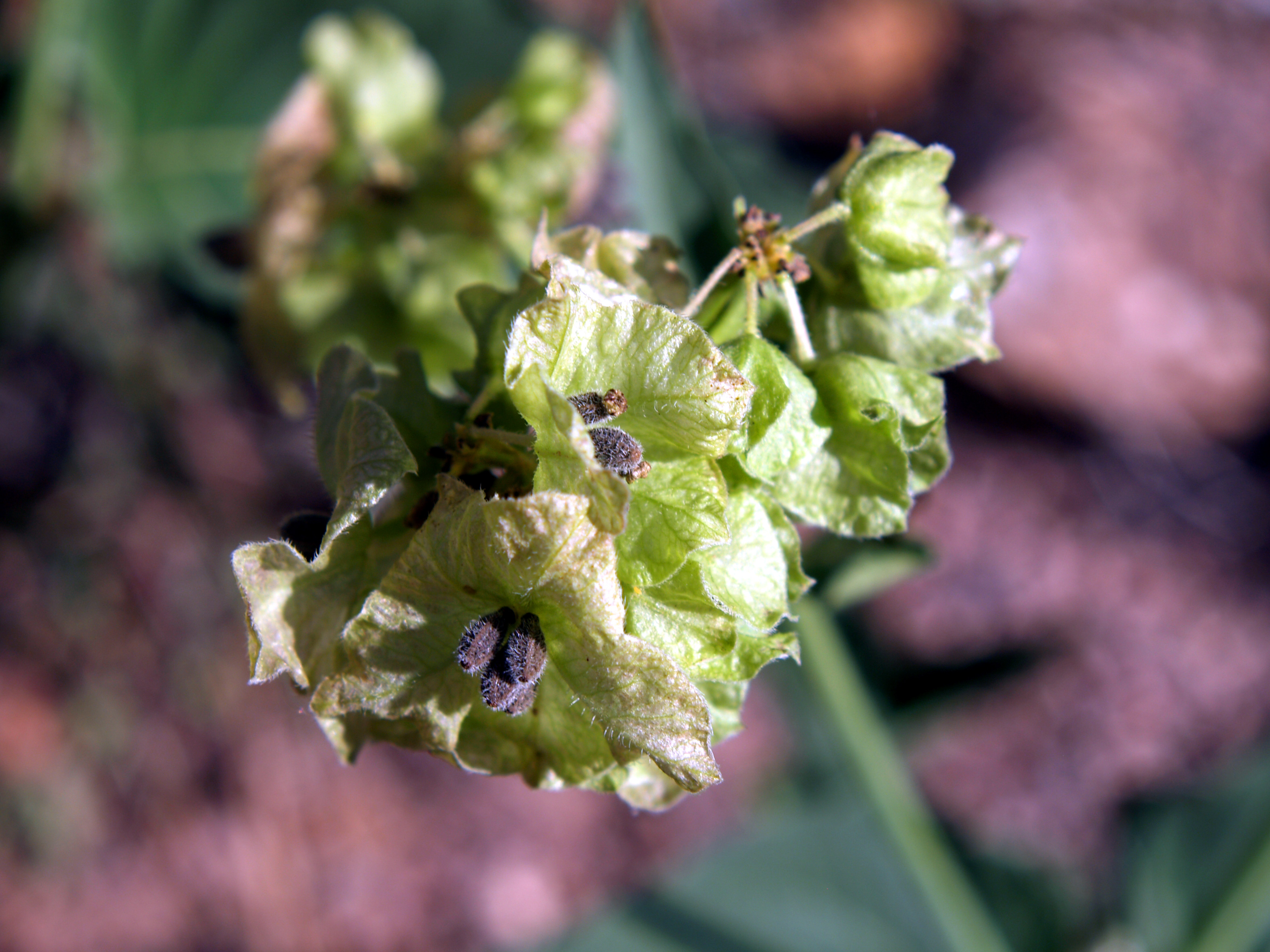

Conservation status
- Secure (NatureServe)

Scientific classification
- Kingdom: Plantae
- Clade: Tracheophytes
- Clade: Angiosperms
- Clade: Eudicots
- Order: Caryophyllales
- Family: Nyctaginaceae
- Genus: Mirabilis
- Species: M. nyctaginea

Binomial name
- Mirabilis nyctaginea (Michx.) MacMill.

Synonyms
- List: Allionia cucullata Fisch., C.A.Mey. & Avé-Lall.; Allionia nyctaginea Michx.; Allionia nyctaginea var. cervantesii Heimerl; Calymenia granulata Raf.; Calymenia nyctaginea (Michx.) Nutt.; Mirabilis oxybaphus Bordz.; Oxybaphus cervantesii var. grandifolius Choisy; Oxybaphus cervantesii var. minor Choisy; Oxybaphus cucullatus (Fisch., C.A.Mey. & Avé-Lall.) Choisy; Oxybaphus nyctagineus (Michx.) Sweet; Oxybaphus nyctagineus var. cervantesii A.Gray

= Mirabilis nyctaginea =

Plant species in the four o'clock family

Mirabilis nyctaginea is a species of flowering plant in the four o'clock family known by several common names, including wild four o'clock, heartleaf four o'clock, and heartleaf umbrella wort.

Four-o'-clock is native to the central section of North America, and it occurs elsewhere as an introduced species, including parts of Europe. Its exact native range is obscure, and it is often weedy throughout its range, spreading into disturbed habitat easily.

Four-o'-clock is a hairy to hairless perennial herb growing erect to over a meter in maximum height. The leaves are oppositely arranged mainly on the lower two thirds of the plant below the upper forkings of the stem. Each thin green leaf has an oval or heart-shaped blade up to 10 centimeters long. The flowers occur in leaf axils on the upper branches. A cluster of 3 to 5 flowers blooms in a bell-shaped involucre of five partly fused bracts. Each five-lobed, funnel-shaped flower is about a centimeter wide and magenta or pink to nearly white in color. The flowers open for only a few hours and drop, leaving the shaggy-haired developing fruits in the drying, papery cup of bracts. The root is a thick, fleshy taproot.

Four-o'-clock is host to the larvae (caterpillars) of several micromoths: Embola ionis is a stem borer, Neoheliodines cliffordi and N. nyctaginella are leaf skeletonizers, and Aetole tripunctella is a leaf miner.

== Traditional uses ==
Mirabilis nyctaginea was called Kactáhkata in the Skiri Pawnee language. "Its root, yellow and sweet, was used to treat coughs. Also used in powdered form as a remedy for sore mouth in babies and in tea form by women after childbirth to reduce abdominal swelling."
