= Borer =

Borer may refer to:

== Insects ==
- Common furniture beetle, also known as the common house borer
- Shoot borer
- Stemborer
- Twig borer

=== Moths ===
- Chilo (moth)
- Southwestern corn borer
- Ash borer, or lilac borer
- Squash vine borer, a pest of cucurbit vines
- Ostrinia, pests of maize and other plants

=== Beetles ===
- Banana root borer, a true weevil
- Ptinidae, a family of beetles, especially:
  - Common house borer
- Woodboring beetle

== Devices ==
- Cork borer, a tool of the chemistry laboratory
- Raise borer, a mining machine
- Instep borer, an instrument of torture
- Tunnel boring machine
- Reamer, a rotary cutting tool used in metalworking
- Drill

== Other uses ==
- Borer Lake, United States
- HMS Borer, several ships
- בורר ("borer"), Sorting/Purification activities prohibited in Jewish law on Shabbat

== See also ==
- Hotheaded Naked Ice Borer, a fictional mammal
