= H. metallica =

H. metallica may refer to:

- Harrisina metallica, the Western grapeleaf skeletonizer, a moth species found in the South-western parts of the United States
- Hyposmocoma metallica, a moth species endemic to Hawaii

== Synonyms ==
- Hedydipna metallica, a synonym for Anthreptes metallicus, the Nile Valley sunbird, a bird species found in Djibouti, Egypt, Eritrea, Ethiopia, Oman, Saudi Arabia, Somalia, Sudan and Yemen

== See also ==
- Metallica (disambiguation)
