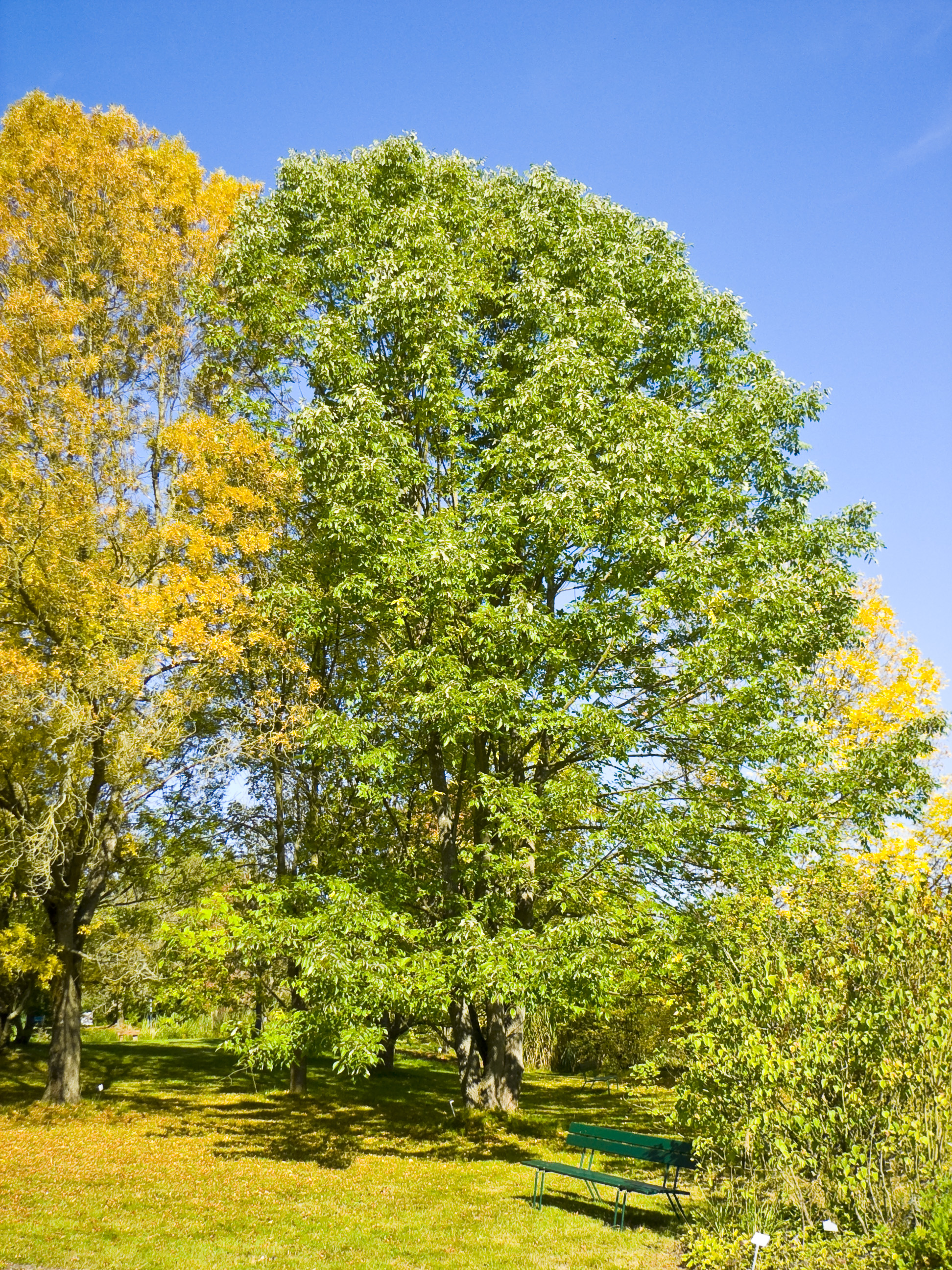

Conservation status
- Critically Endangered (IUCN 3.1)

- Apparently Secure (NatureServe)

Scientific classification
- Kingdom: Plantae
- Clade: Tracheophytes
- Clade: Angiosperms
- Clade: Eudicots
- Clade: Asterids
- Order: Lamiales
- Family: Oleaceae
- Genus: Fraxinus
- Section: Fraxinus sect. Melioides
- Species: F. americana

Binomial name
- Fraxinus americana L.
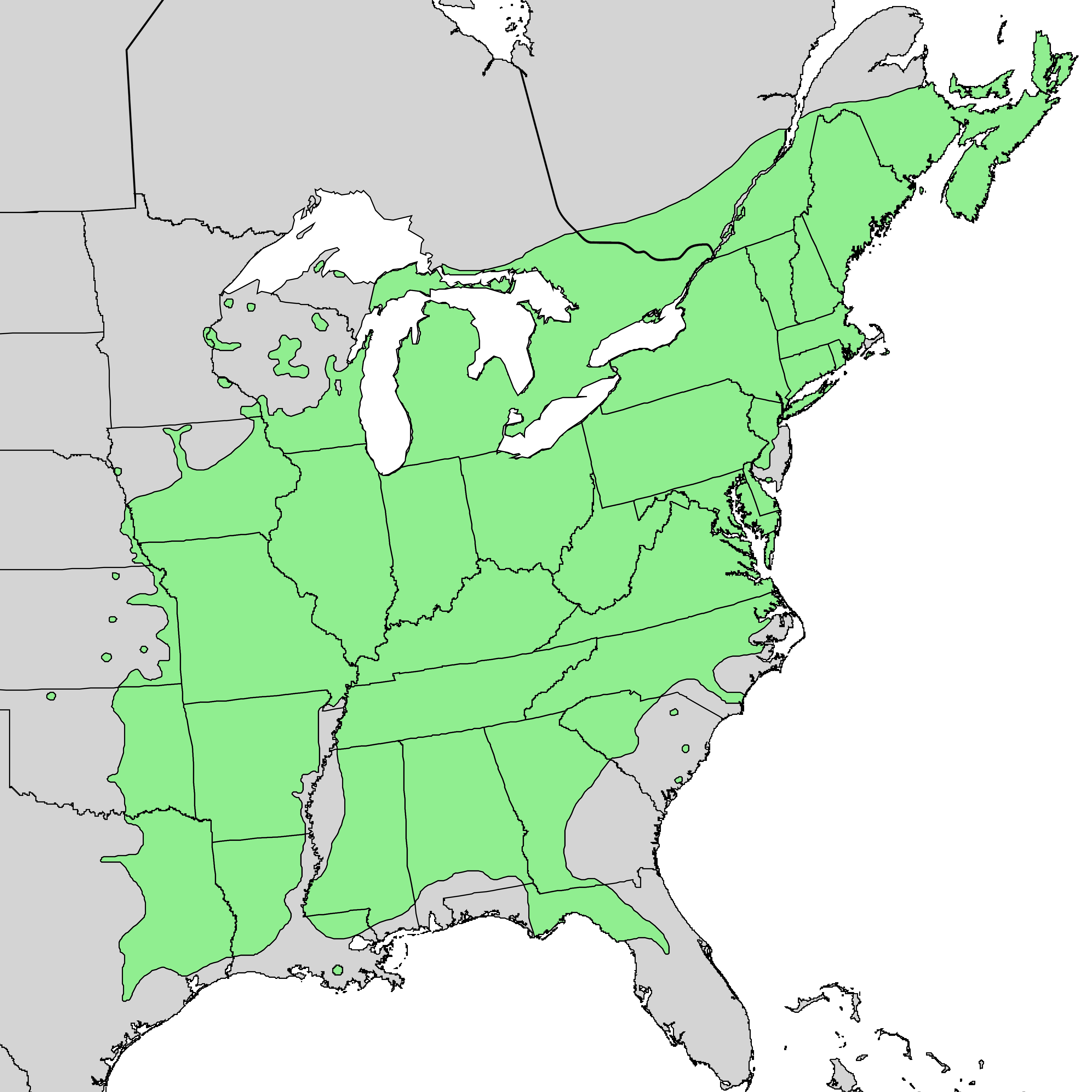
- Natural range of Fraxinus americana

Synonyms
- List: Aplilia macrophyla (Hoffmanns.) Raf.; Calycomelia acuminata (Lam.) Kostel.; Calycomelia alba (Marshall) Kostel.; Calycomelia americana (L.) Kostel.; Calycomelia biltmoreana (Beadle) Nieuwl.; Calycomelia epiptera (Michx.) Kostel.; Calycomelia juglandifolia (Lam.) Kostel.; Calycomelia pistaciifolia Nieuwl.; Calycomelia viridis (Bosc) Kostel.; Fraxinoides alba (Marshall) Medik.; Fraxinus acuminata Lam.; Fraxinus alba Marshall; Fraxinus americana subsp. typicum Wesm.; Fraxinus biltmoreana Beadle; Fraxinus biltmoreana var. subcoriacea (Sarg.) J.J.N.Campb.; Fraxinus canadensis Gaertn.; Fraxinus carolinensis Wangenh.; Fraxinus caroliniana var. latifolia (Vahl) Willd.; Fraxinus caroliniana Willd.; Fraxinus curtissii Vasey; Fraxinus discolor Muhl.; Fraxinus discolor var. juglandifolia (Lam.) Muhl.; Fraxinus epiptera Michx.; Fraxinus glauca Raf.; Fraxinus grandifolia Raf.; Fraxinus juglandifolia Lam.; Fraxinus juglandifolia var. subserrata Willd.; Fraxinus macrophylla Hoffmanns.; Fraxinus nigra var. juglandifolia (Lam.) Castigl.; Fraxinus novae-angliae Mill.; Fraxinus pennsylvanica subsp. novae-angliae (Mill.) Buttler; Fraxinus pistaciifolia E.Hall ex A.Gray.; Fraxinus pubescens var. latifolia Vahl; Fraxinus pubescens var. longifolia Vahl; Fraxinus villosa Dum.Cours.; Fraxinus viridis Bosc; Leptalix acuminata (Lam.) Raf.; Leptalix alba (Marshall) Raf.; Leptalix epiptera (Michx.) Raf.; Leptalix glauca Raf.; Leptalix grandifolia Raf.; Leptalix juglandifolia (Lam.) Raf.; Leptalix viridis (Bosc) Raf.; Ornanthes americana (L.) Raf.; Ornus americana (L.) Bosc

= Fraxinus americana =

Species of ash tree

Fraxinus americana, the white ash or American ash, is a deciduous ash tree in the olive family (Oleaceae) native to eastern and central North America. It is straight-trunked and fast-growing, reaching 60 to 90 feet tall with a canopy spread of 50 to 75 feet wide. The tree is highly valued as lumber for its straight grain and superior hardness.

The white ash population in North America was devastated by the invasive emerald ash borer, which has killed hundreds of millions of them as it spread since its arrival in the late 1990s or early 2000s. Surviving white ashes are often much younger, with the oldest and tallest white ashes largely becoming dead trees due to the emerald ash borer. The population is still in decline.

== Description ==
The name white ash derives from the glaucous undersides of the leaves. It is similar in appearance to the green ash, making identification difficult. The lower sides of the leaves of white ash are lighter in color than their upper sides, and the outer surface of the twigs of white ash may be flaky or peeling. Green ash leaves are similar in color on upper and lower sides, and twigs are smoother. White ash leaves turn yellow or red in autumn. Despite some overlap, the two species tend to grow in different locations as well; white ash is a forest tree that commonly occurs alongside sugar maple while green ash is a pioneer species that inhabits riparian zones and disturbed areas. The white ash's compound leaves usually have seven leaflets per leaf whereas the counts in other ash trees more often vary.

Like other species in the section Melioides, Fraxinus americana is dioecious, with male and female flowers produced on separate individuals.

The C-shaped leaf scars of white ash are useful in distinguishing this species from the closely related green ash (Fraxinus pennsylvanica). The lateral buds of F. pennsylvanica share a less curved margin with their corresponding leaf scars, imparting an overall D shape to the latter.

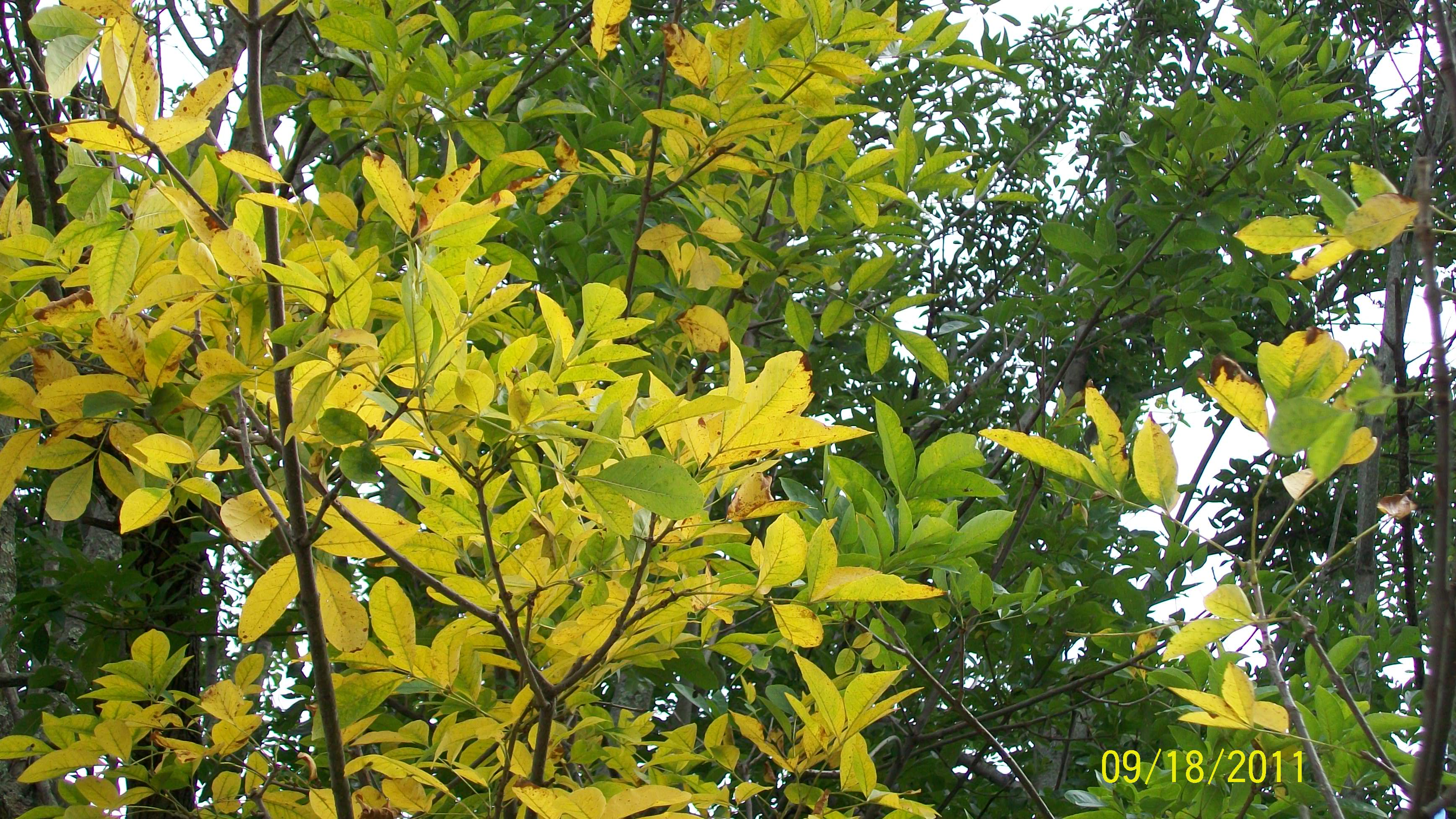
Fall, Russell County, Virginia

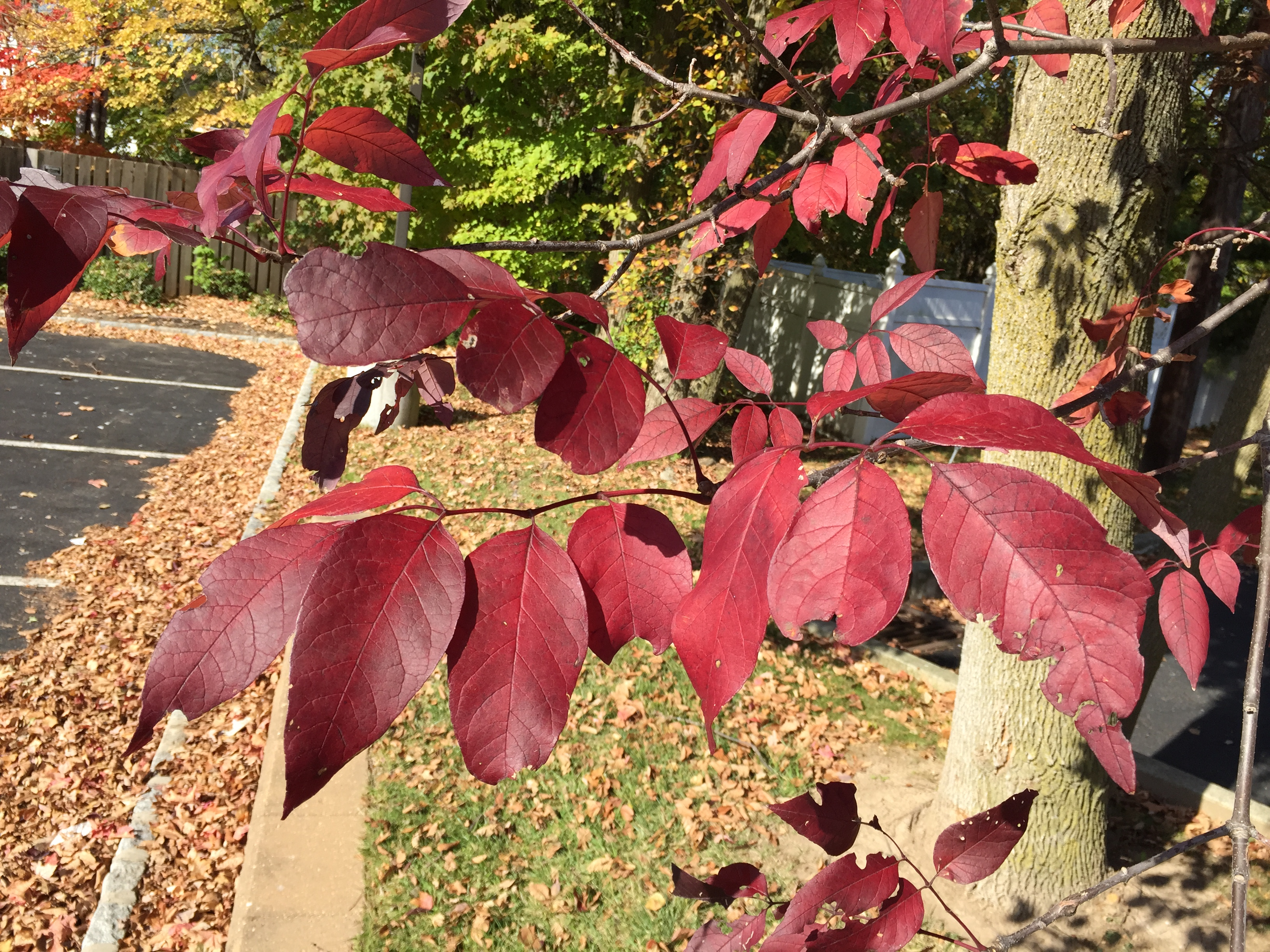
Autumn foliage

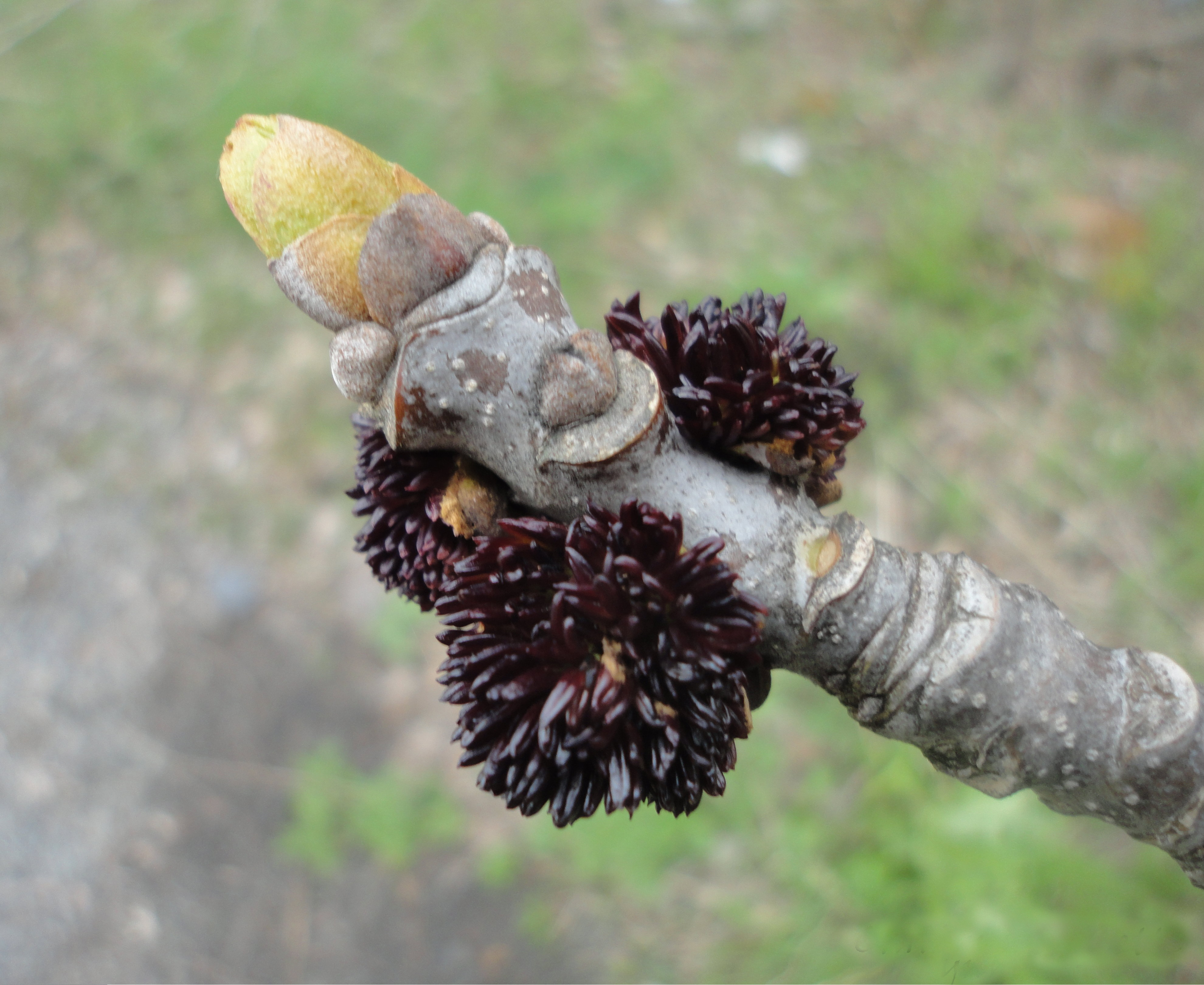
Detail of twig showing C-shaped leaf scar

== Distribution and habitat ==
The species is native to mesophytic hardwood forests from Nova Scotia west to Minnesota, south to northern Florida, and southwest to eastern Texas. Isolated populations have also been found in western Texas, Wyoming, and Colorado, and the species is reportedly naturalized in Hawaii.

There are an estimated 8 billion ash trees in the United States – the majority being white ash trees and green ash trees.

== Ecology ==
=== Emerald ash borer ===
The emerald ash borer (Agrilus planipennis), also commonly known by the acronym EAB, is a green beetle native to Asia; its larvae kill ash trees. In North America, the EAB is an invasive species, highly destructive to ash trees in its introduced range. The damage of this insect rivals that of chestnut blight and Dutch elm disease. For perspective, the number of chestnuts killed by the chestnut blight was around 3.5 billion chestnut trees, while there were 3.5 billion ash trees in Ohio alone. Dutch elm disease killed 200 million elm trees, and EAB threatened 7.5 billion ash trees in the United States of 2000.

The insect threatens the entire North American genus Fraxinus. It was first identified in the United States in Canton, Michigan in 2002, but likely was introduced a few years earlier. It has spread to eleven states and adjacent parts of Canada. It has killed at least 50 million ash trees as of 2019 and threatens to kill most of the ash trees throughout North America. White ash exhibits a little more resistance to the EAB than green ash, which has nearly no resistance; however this could also possibly be due to white ash not being used in landscaping as extensively or placed in high-stress environments.

An infested tree can be recognized by premature fall color and leaf senescence observed on affected branches between August and last week of September. Before the EAB was officially identified, such dieback symptoms were thought to have been caused by a vascular disease classified as ash yellows. It was assumed damage was caused by the EAB taking advantage of weakened trees. Other recognizable signs regularly observed have been upper crown dieback, epicormic shoots or sprouts, bark lesions, frass filled larval galleries, and deformed exit holes. When the "flatheaded" beetle has fully developed, it will bore out of the tree, in this instance, with a hole in a deformed "D" shape. In the past, it was assumed once any symptoms had started to show, or once a tree had become infested, it was likely too late to begin management. Later it became clear that only on-site professionals diagnosing an individual tree can responsibly make such determinations.

=== Ash fungal disease ===
Hymenoscyphus fraxineus is a fungal disease that attacks ash trees. The disease causes leaf loss, crown dieback, and lesions in the bark. This fungus is, for the most part, fatal, both directly and indirectly, by weakening the tree's immune system so that it is more susceptible to attacks from pests or pathogens. Because of this, younger trees are more affected, and fully mature ash trees are incapable of living long enough to reproduce. The disease has spread over most of Europe and has been confirmed in Britain, however as of 2018 it has not been found in North America. The scale of the threat is not yet known, but is thought to be able to cause significant damage to the ash landscape of Europe and the UK.

== Cultivation and uses ==
White ash is one of the most used trees for everyday purposes and, to keep up with high demand, is cultivated almost everywhere possible. The wood is white and quite dense (within 20% of 670 kg/m^{3}), strong, and straight-grained. Its species produces an ideal, atypical dominant excurrent structured crown. It is a traditional timber of choice for production of baseball bats and tool handles. The wood is also favorable for furniture and flooring. A study compared it to eight other different species, and it showed the highest antibacterial activity in the context of manufacturing chopping boards.

Woodworkers use the timber mainly for interior uses due to high perishability in contact with ground soil. It is also used to make lobster traps. Since the 1950s, it has also become a popular choice for solid electric guitar bodies. It makes a serviceable longbow if properly worked. The wood was used in ceiling fan blades from the 1970s through the mid-1980s, though cane was sometimes simulated with plastic then. It is no longer used for ceiling fan blades in most countries.

White ash is not seen in cultivation as often as green ash, due to its preference for undisturbed forest sites away from urban pollution and soil compaction. It sometimes has been planted for its consistently reliable autumn colors, which typically are bright orange and red hues as opposed to other species of ash that produce a uniform yellow color.

Cultivation of white ash differs across North American continent. For example, within the City of Chicago region, 2010 statistics show most common street tree species is white ash at 6.2%. Along with third ranked green type at 4.9%, ashes combine to make up 11% percent of the city's street trees, with an overall population of 13,648,044 million standing ashes within Cook County alone.

The cultivar 'Autumn Purple', also called 'Junginger' for Karl Junginger of McKay Nursery, was introduced to the plant trade in 1956. Though Junginger is credited for the discovery of the seedless cultivar with its strong reddish-purple autumn color, according to the University of Wisconsin it was first spotted by G. William Longenecker in front of the old Home Economics building who made the first graft the tree in 1955. It quickly became the most popular and most expensive landscaping selection, surpassing the high priced ginkgo, London plane and white/burr oak. A related species, Biltmore ash, is sometimes treated as a variety of white ash. Other taxonomists argue that Biltmore ash is its own species (Fraxinus biltmoreana).

North American native ash tree species are used by North American frogs as a critical food source, as leaves that fall from the trees are particularly suitable for tadpoles to feed upon in ponds (both temporary and permanent), large puddles, and other water sources. Species such as red maple, which are taking the place of ash due to the ash borer, are much less suitable for the frogs as a food source—resulting in poor frog survival rates and small frog sizes. The lack of tannins in the American ash variety makes them a good food source for frogs, but are not resistant to the ash borer. Varieties of ash from outside North America typically have much higher tannin levels and resist the borer. Maples and various non-native invasive trees, trees that are taking the place of American ash species in the North American ecosystem, typically have much higher leaf tannin levels. Ash species native to North America also provide important habitat and food for various other creatures that are native to North America.
