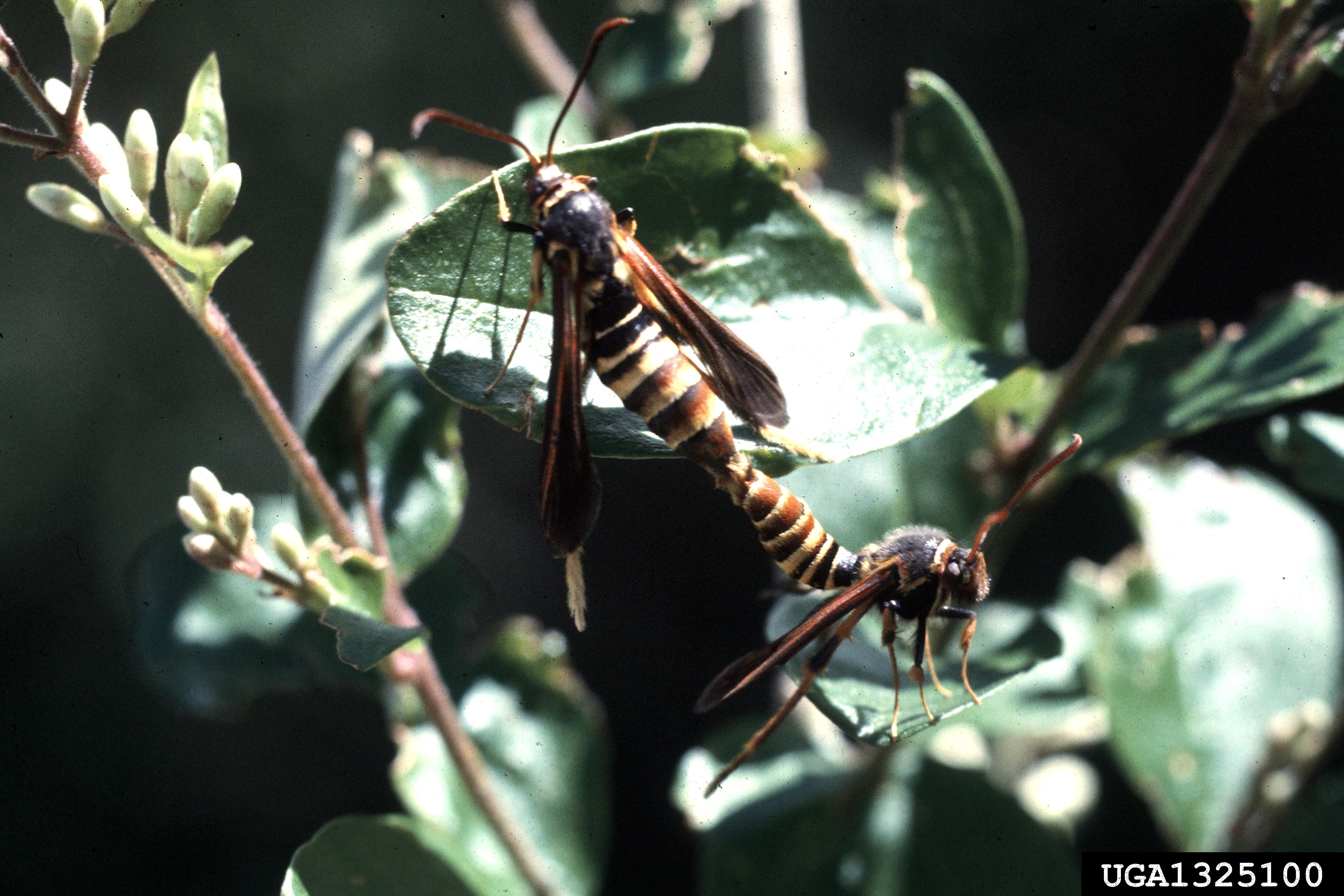
- Podosesia syringae

Scientific classification
- Domain: Eukaryota
- Kingdom: Animalia
- Phylum: Arthropoda
- Class: Insecta
- Order: Lepidoptera
- Family: Sesiidae
- Tribe: Synanthedonini
- Genus: Podosesia; Möschler, 1879

Species
- See text

= Podosesia =

Genus of moths

Podosesia is a genus of moths in the family Sesiidae. It was originally named Grotea in 1876 but this name was replaced in 1879

== Species ==
- Podosesia aureocincta Purrington & Nielsen, 1977
- Podosesia syringae (Harris, 1839)
- Podosesia surodes Hampson, 1919
