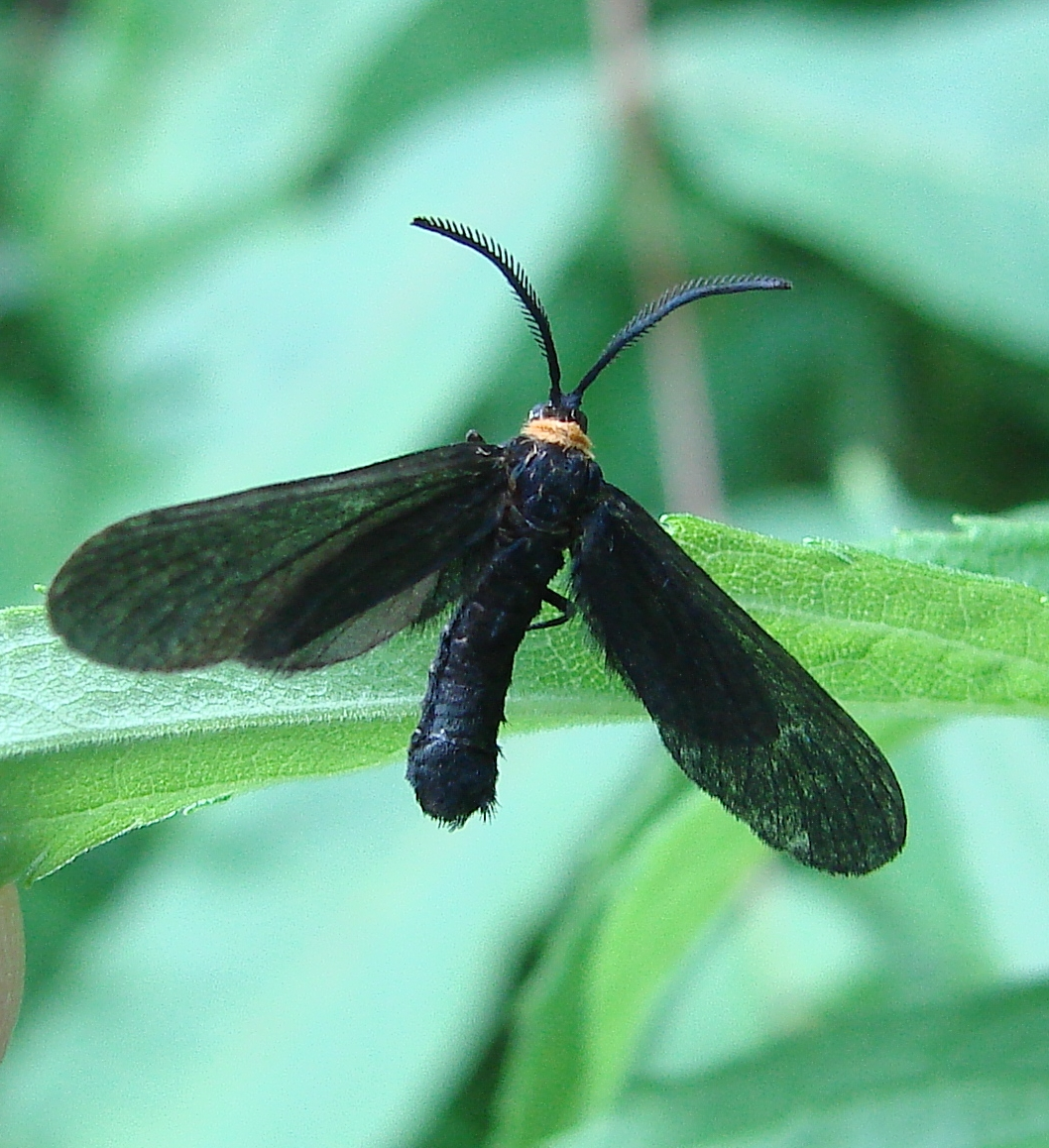

Scientific classification
- Domain: Eukaryota
- Kingdom: Animalia
- Phylum: Arthropoda
- Class: Insecta
- Order: Lepidoptera
- Family: Zygaenidae
- Subfamily: Procridinae
- Genus: Harrisina (Packard, 1864)

= Harrisina =

Genus of moths

Harrisina is a genus of moths of the family Zygaenidae.

== Species ==
- Harrisina americana – grapeleaf skeletonizer (Guérin-Méneville, [1832])
- Harrisina aversus (H. Edwards, 1884)
- Harrisina brillians (Barnes & McDunnough, 1910)
- Harrisina coracina (Clemens, 1860)
- Harrisina cyanea (Barnes & McDunnough, 1910)
- Harrisina guatemalena (Druce, 1884)
- Harrisina lustrans (Beutenmüller, 1894)
- Harrisina metallica – western grapeleaf skeletonizer (Stretch, 1885)
- Harrisina mystica (Walker, 1854)
- Harrisina rumelii (Druce, 1884)
