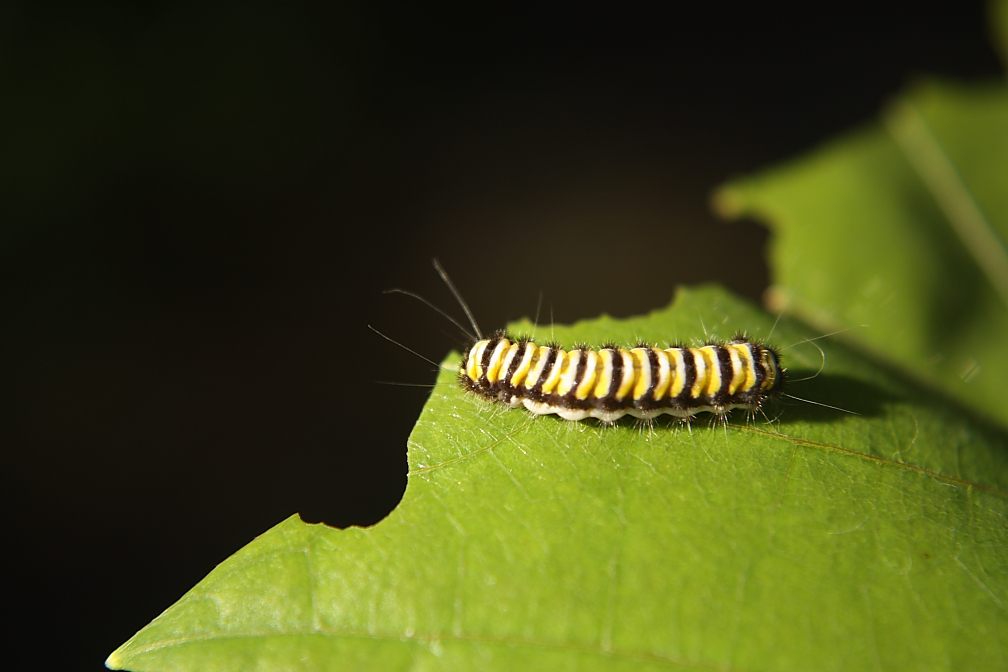
- Harrisina americana larva
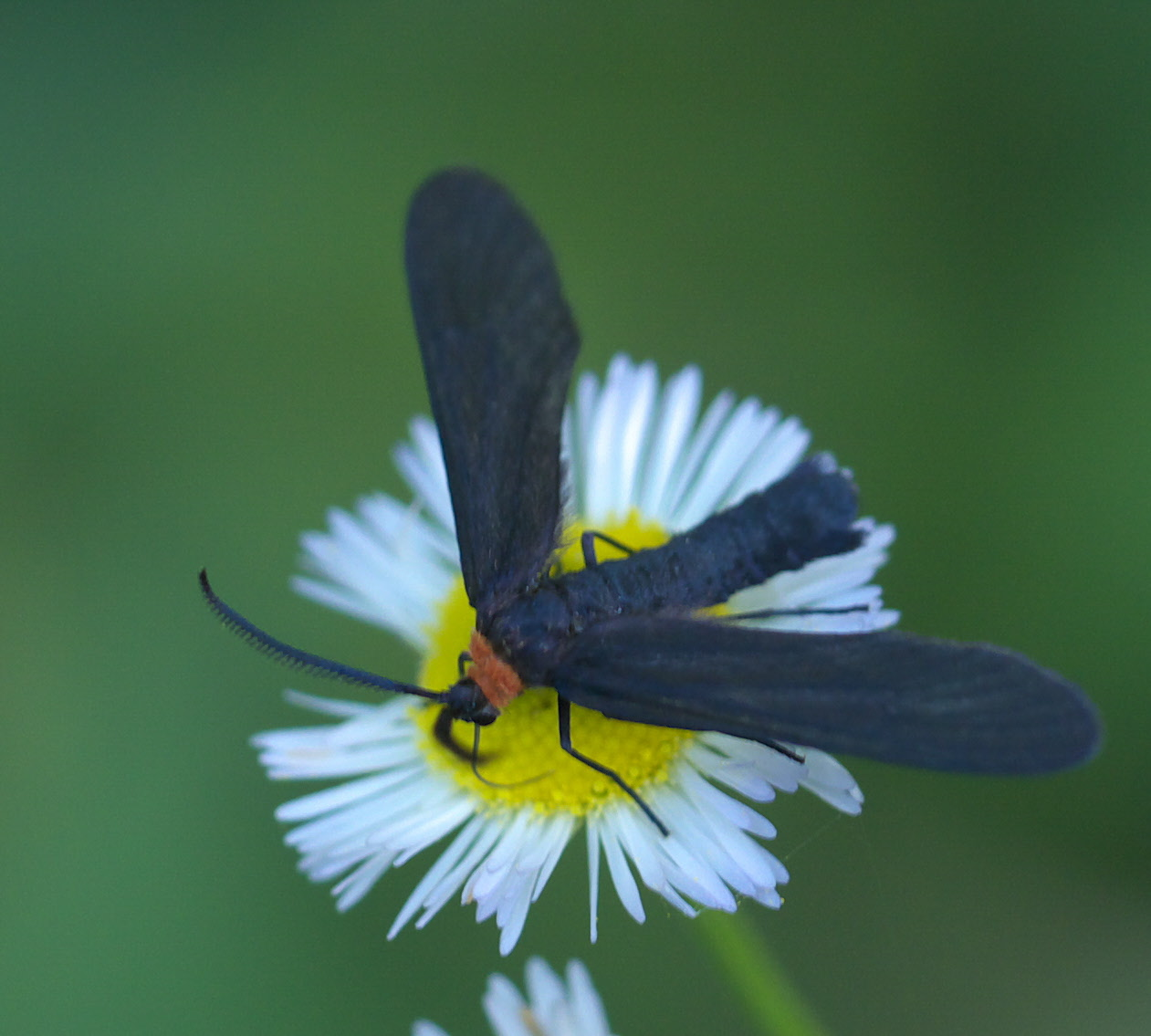
- Harrisina americana adult

Scientific classification
- Kingdom: Animalia
- Phylum: Arthropoda
- Clade: Pancrustacea
- Class: Insecta
- Order: Lepidoptera
- Family: Zygaenidae
- Genus: Harrisina
- Species: H. americana

Binomial name
- Harrisina americana (Guérin-Méneville, 1844)

= Grapeleaf skeletonizer =

Species of moth

The grapeleaf skeletonizer (Harrisina americana) is a moth in the family Zygaenidae. It is widespread in the eastern half of the United States, and commonly noticed defoliating grapes, especially of the Virginia creeper (Parthenocissus quinquefolia). The western grapeleaf skeletonizer (Harrisina metallica) is very similar to and slightly larger than H. americana, but their distributions are different.

Members of this family all produce HCN (hydrogen cyanide) a potent antipredator toxin.

== Identification ==
The adult has narrow black wings, usually held away from the body at rest, and a reddish collar. The wingspan is 18–28 mm, the length 8–12 mm.

The larva has a dark head; the body is yellow with a complete black band across each abdominal segment. The larvae can reach up to 15 mm in length.

== Life history ==
There are several generations per year in the south, and one in the north of its range.

=== Eggs ===
Eggs are lemon yellow, shaped like a capsule, slightly over 0.5 mm in length and are laid in clusters on the underside of leaves. They hatch in about a week.

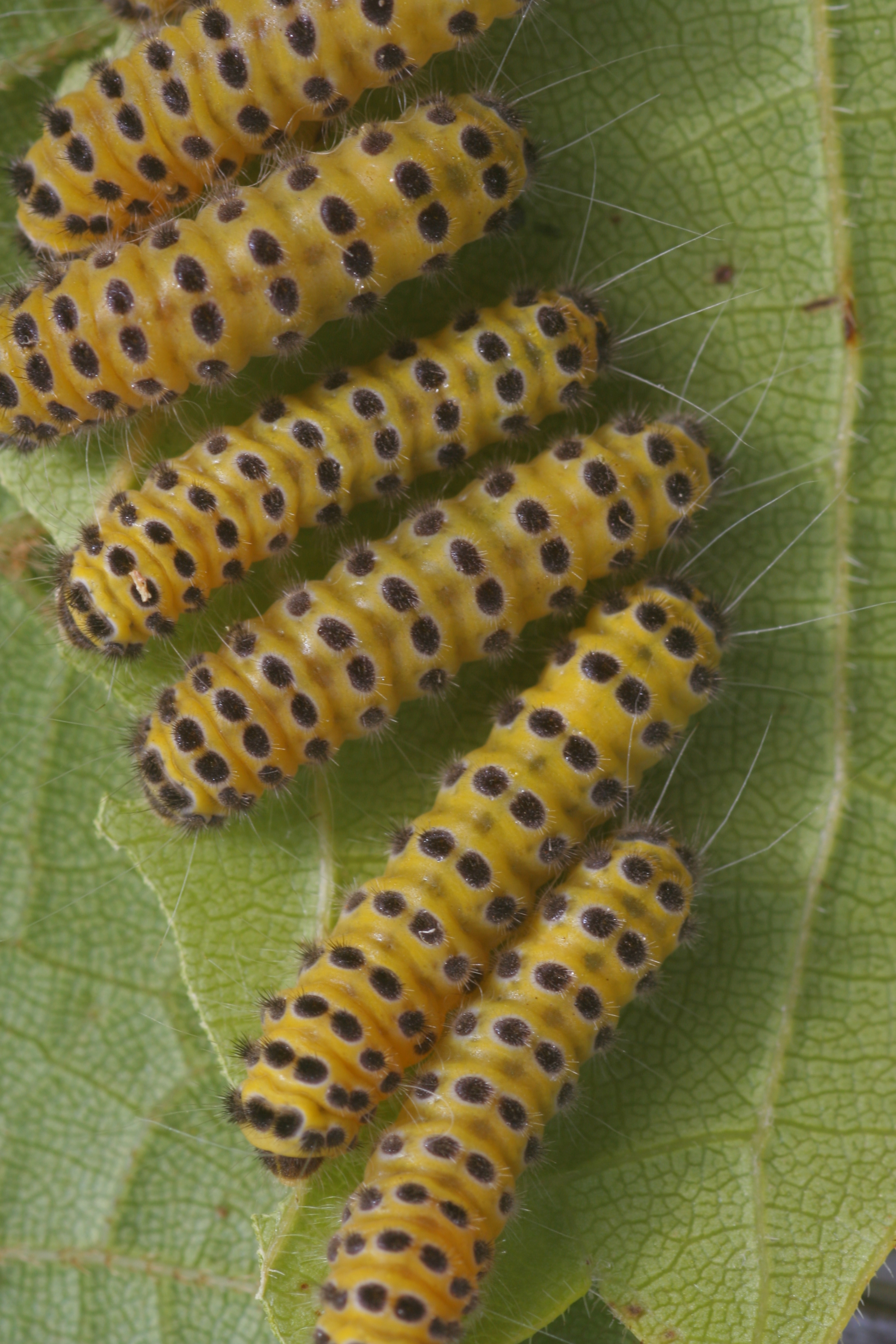
Gregarious larvae

=== Larvae ===
Larvae are stout, with ten bright yellow bands or lines of dots, and eleven black bands alternating. They have hair-like setae that, if brushed against, will give a rash that lasts several days. They feed in groups that become progressively smaller as the larvae age. They constantly live on the underside of the leaves, and frequently line up side by side. Development from hatch to pupation takes about 40 days.

This is the only moth species that feeds gregariously on grape foliage.

=== Pupae ===
The pupa is brown, and lasts about two weeks in the summer, when multiple generations are possible. The pupa is also the overwintering stage, among leaves at the base of the food plant.

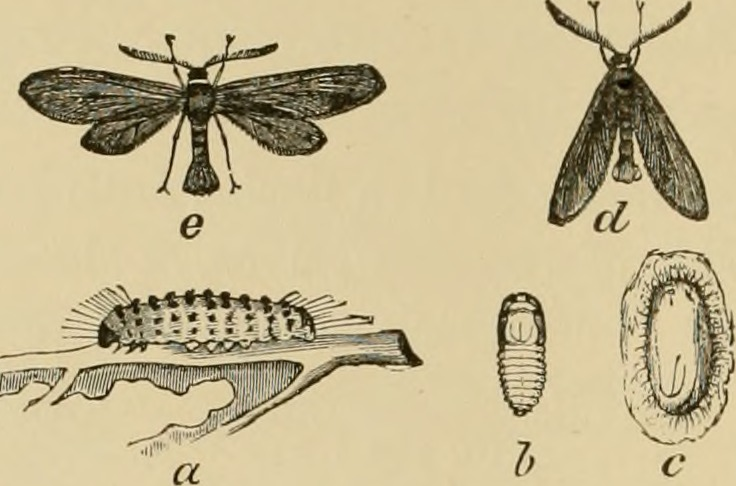
Life cycle of Harrisina americana

=== Adults ===
Adult moths are uniformly black except for a reddish or orange collar. The body and wings are long and narrow, and the abdomen is usually held curled upwards, with a tuft of hairs at the tip. Adults are active visiting flowers during the day as well as at night. They live only a few days.
