= Podosesia surodes =

Scientific classification
- Kingdom: Animalia
- Phylum: Arthropoda
- Class: Insecta
- Order: Lepidoptera
- Family: Sesiidae
- Genus: Podosesia
- Species: P. surodes

Binomial name
- Podosesia surodes Hampson, 1919

Species of moth

Podosesia surodes is a moth of the family Sesiidae. It is known from Malawi.
