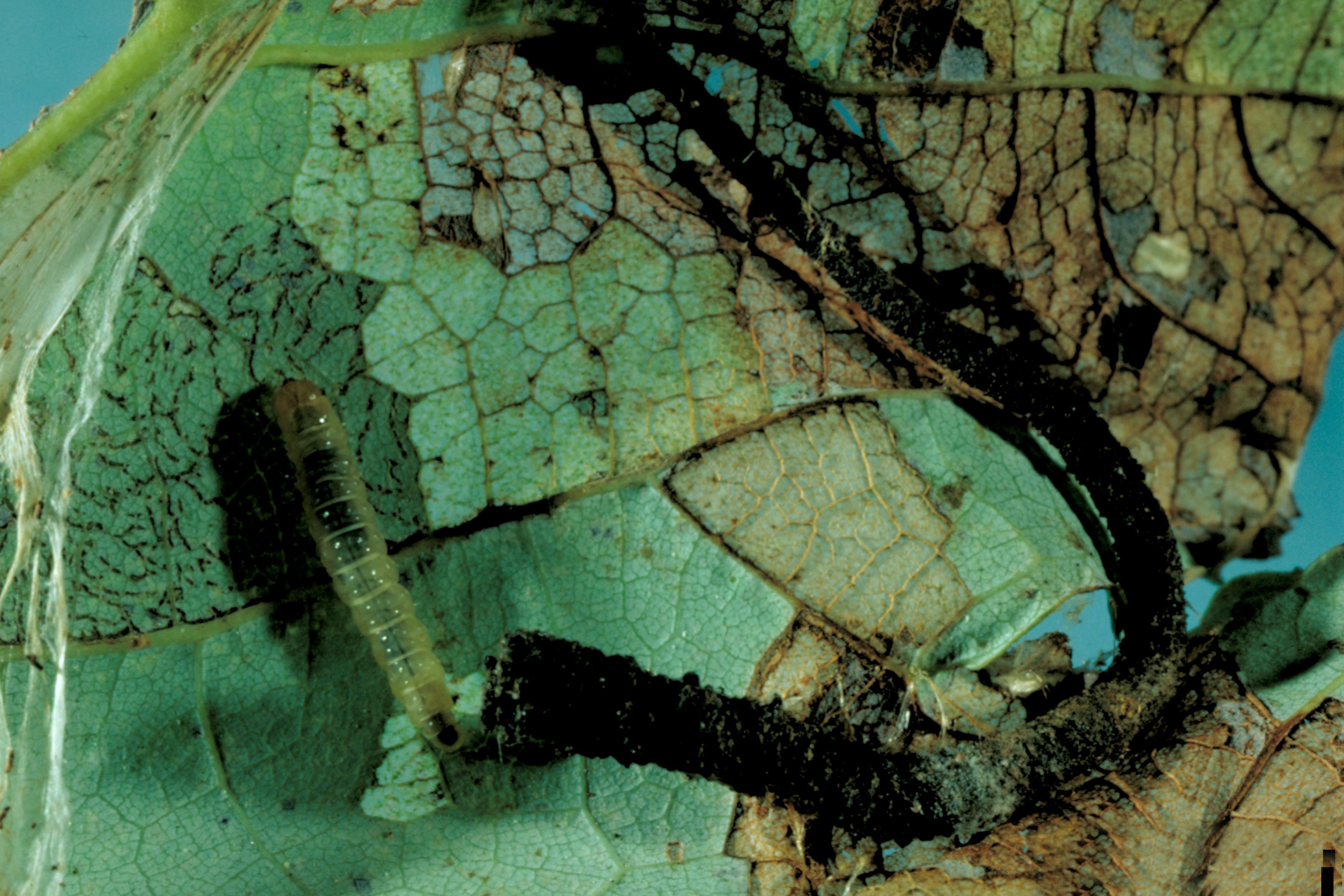
- Catastega aceriella

Scientific classification
- Kingdom: Animalia
- Phylum: Arthropoda
- Clade: Pancrustacea
- Class: Insecta
- Order: Lepidoptera
- Family: Tortricidae
- Tribe: Endotheniini
- Genus: Catastega; Clemens, 1861

= Catastega =

Genus of tortrix moths

Catastega is a genus of moths belonging to the family Tortricidae.

== Species ==
- Catastega aceriella Clemens, 1861
- Catastega adobe Brown, 1992
- Catastega marmoreana (Heinrich, 1923)
- Catastega nebula Brown, 1992
- Catastega plicata Brown, 1992
- Catastega spectra Brown, 1992
- Catastega strigatella Brown, 1992
- Catastega timidella Clemens, 1861
- Catastega triangulana Brown, 1992

== See also ==
- List of Tortricidae genera
