= Skeletonization (disambiguation) =

Skeletonization is the state of a dead organism after undergoing decomposition.

Skeletonization may also refer to

- Skeletonization, a process in shape analysis of making a topological skeleton, a thin version of a shape that is equidistant to its boundaries
- Skeletonization of fusion categories, a mathematical process whereby one extracts the core data of a fusion category
- Lightening holes, holes in structural components of machines and buildings
