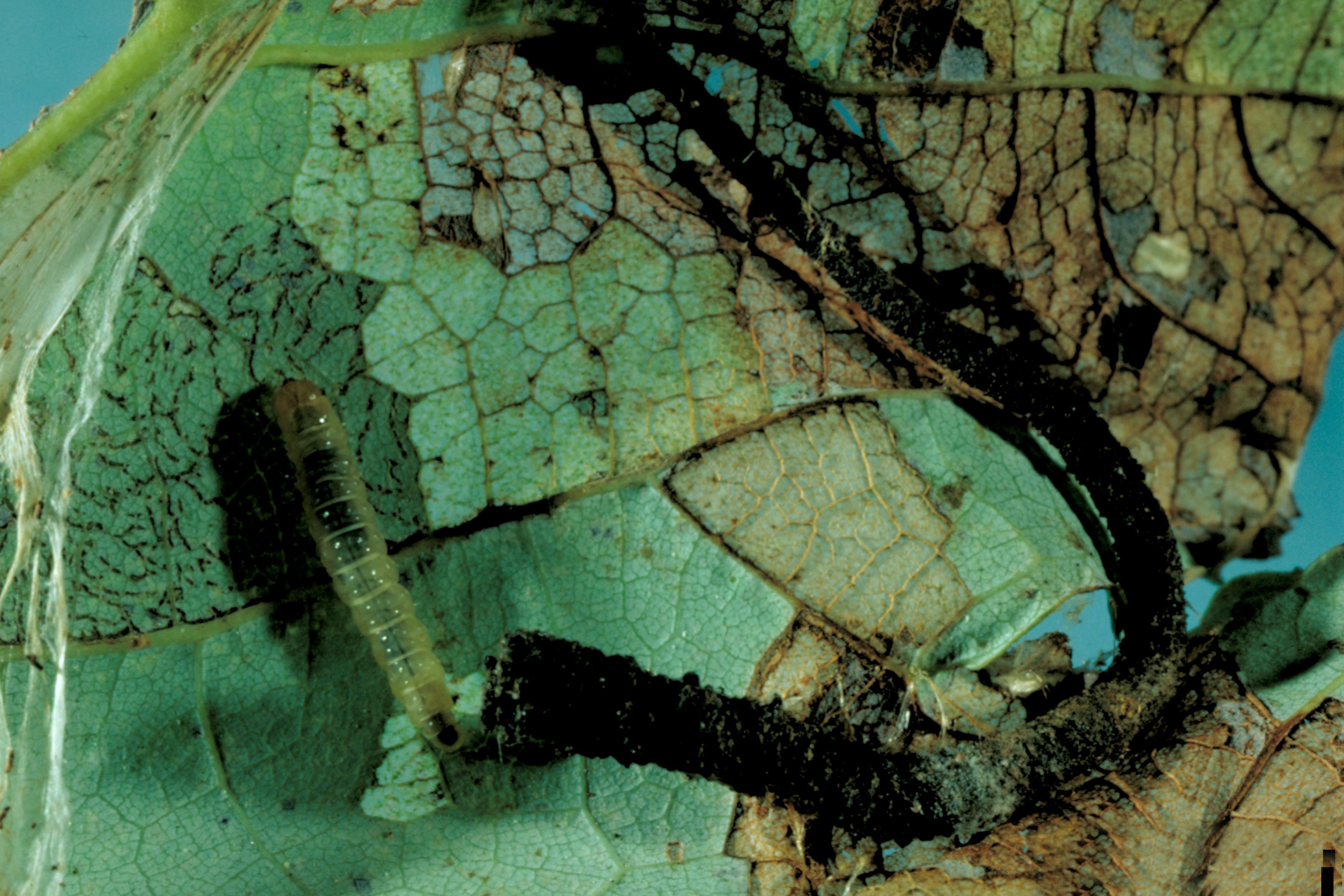
- Larva

Scientific classification
- Kingdom: Animalia
- Phylum: Arthropoda
- Clade: Pancrustacea
- Class: Insecta
- Order: Lepidoptera
- Family: Tortricidae
- Genus: Catastega
- Species: C. aceriella

Binomial name
- Catastega aceriella Clemens, 1861

Synonyms
- Hedya signatana Clemens, 1864; Grapholitha subnisana Zeller, 1875; Steganoptycha variana Clemens, 1864

= Catastega aceriella =

Maple trumpet skeletonizer moth

Species of moth

Catastega aceriella, the maple trumpet skeletonizer moth, is a moth of the family Tortricidae. It is found in North America from southern Ontario and Nova Scotia to North Carolina and Tennessee.

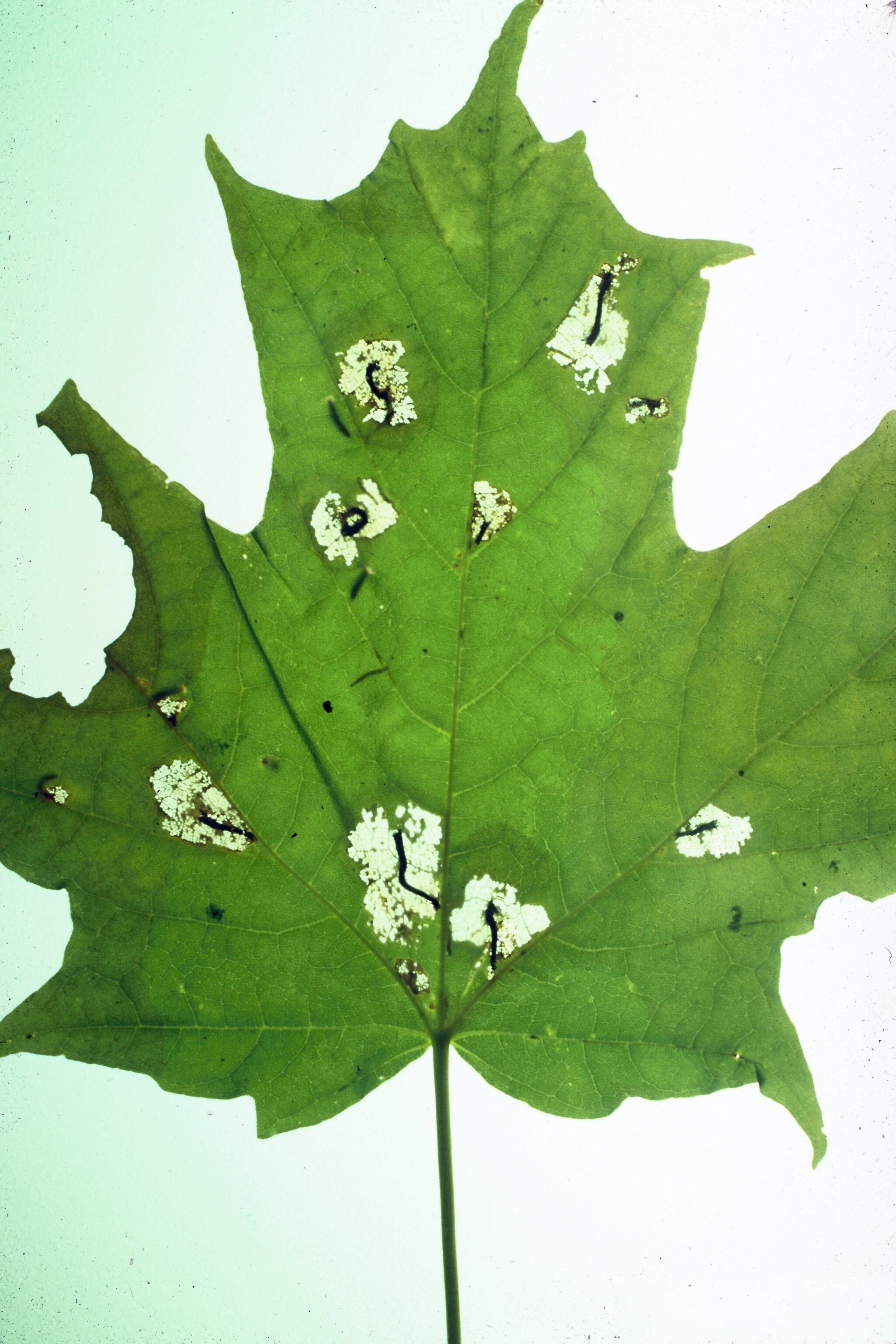
Damage

The wingspan is 13–17 mm. There may be more than one generation per year.

The larvae feed on Acer species.
