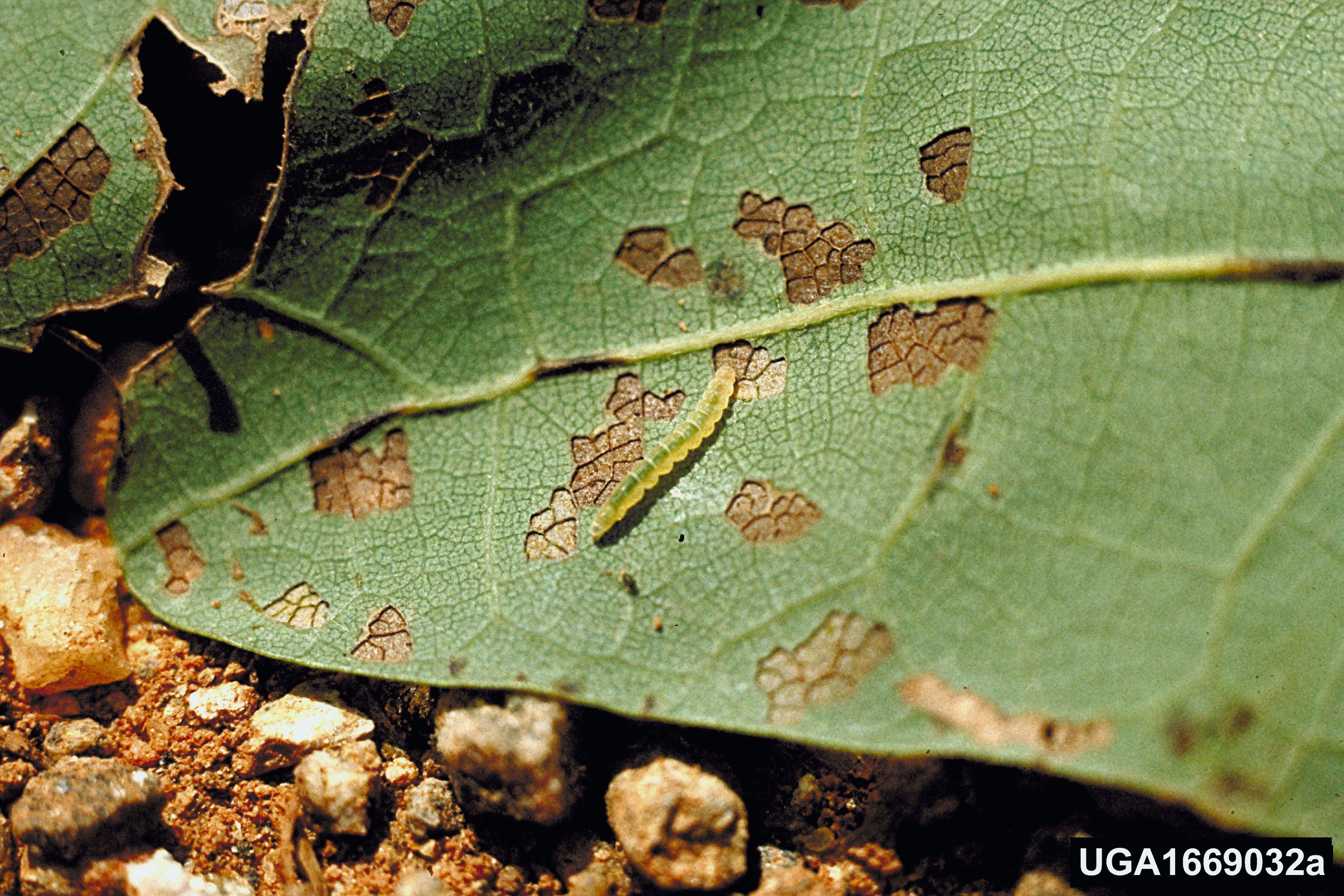

Scientific classification
- Kingdom: Animalia
- Phylum: Arthropoda
- Clade: Pancrustacea
- Class: Insecta
- Order: Lepidoptera
- Family: Bucculatricidae
- Genus: Bucculatrix
- Species: B. ainsliella

Binomial name
- Bucculatrix ainsliella Murtfeldt, 1905

= Bucculatrix ainsliella =

Species of moth

Bucculatrix ainsliella, the oak leaf skeletonizer or oak skeletonizer, is a moth species of the family Bucculatricidae. It is found in the northern part of the United States, down to North Carolina and Mississippi and the Southern parts of Canada, including British Columbia. In 2011 it was discovered in the Netherlands and Belgium. It was first described in 1905 by Mary Murtfeldt.

The wingspan is 7–8 mm. Adults are on wing between February and August depending on the location.

The larvae feed on Quercus species, first as leaf miner and later feeding externally.
