= Cork borer =

Laboratory tool

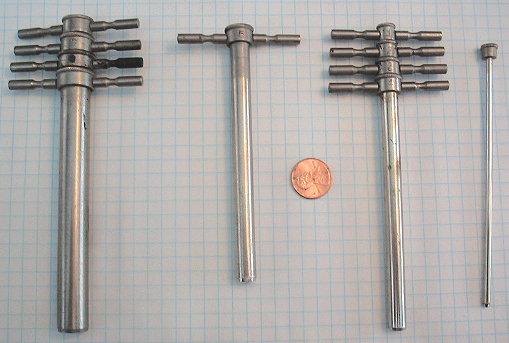
Set of cork borers. Left to right sizes 6,7,8,9 nested, size 5, American penny for scale, sizes 4,3,2,1 nested, pusher. Background is 1/4" square graph paper.

A cork borer, often used in a chemistry or biology laboratory, is a metal tool for cutting a hole in a cork or rubber stopper to insert glass tubing. Cork borers usually come in a set of nested sizes along with a solid pin for pushing the removed cork (or rubber) out of the borer. The individual borer is a hollow tube, tapered at the edge, generally with some kind of handle at the other end.

A separate device is a cork borer sharpener used to hone the cutting edge to more easily slice the cork.

Cork borers are also used to take samples from living trees, for tree ring analysis (dendrochronology), and for taking samples for experiments when a constant diameter is required, e.g. When testing the water potential of a potato, a cork borer is used to maintain a constant surface area.

A cork borer is also used to punch holes on an agar plate and to perform well diffusion assays in microbiology to study bioactivity.
