= HMS Borer =

HMS Borer may refer to:

- HMS Borer (1794), a gunvessel launched in 1794 and sold in 1810
- HMS Borer (1812), a gun-brig launched in 1812 and sold in 1815
