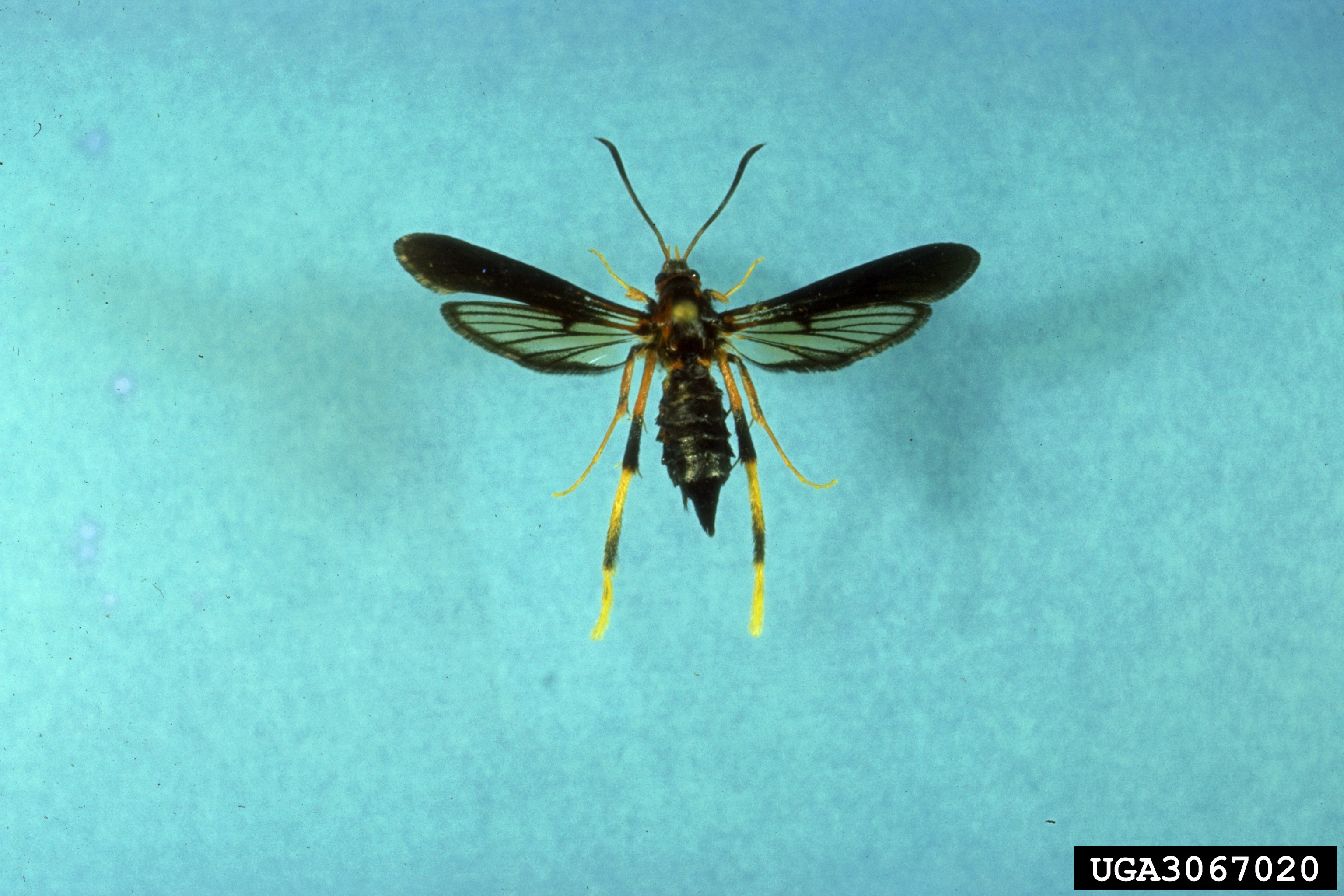

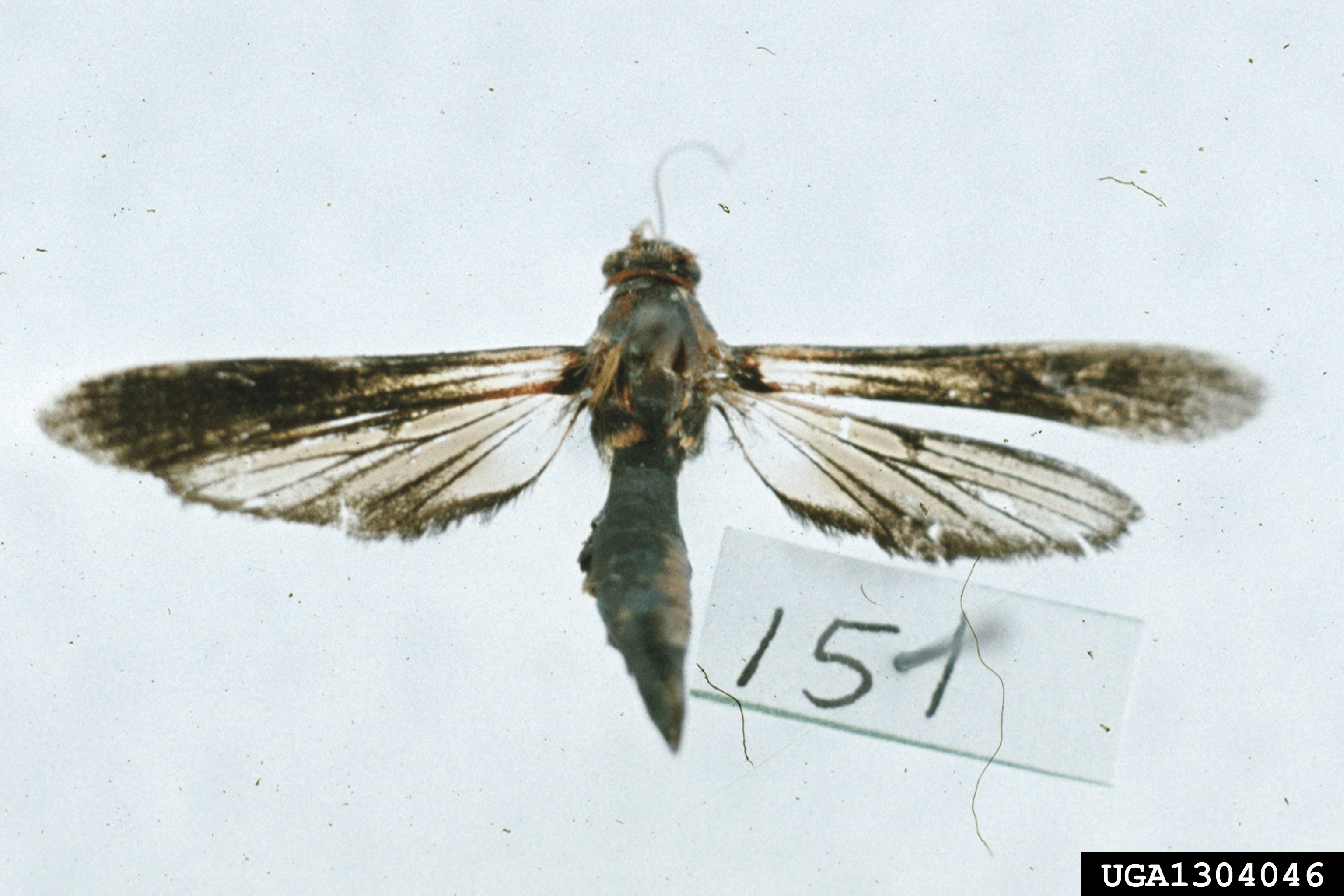

Scientific classification
- Domain: Eukaryota
- Kingdom: Animalia
- Phylum: Arthropoda
- Class: Insecta
- Order: Lepidoptera
- Family: Sesiidae
- Genus: Podosesia
- Species: P. syringae

Binomial name
- Podosesia syringae Harris, 1839

= Ash borer =

Species of moth

The ash borer (Podosesia syringae), or lilac borer, is a clearwing moth in the family Sesiidae. It is found throughout North America and can be a pest of ash and lilac.

== Appearance ==
Like other clear wing moths, ash borers have partially transparent wings due to a lack of colored scales on the wings. The body is brown with yellowing striping on the legs and abdomen, and can give the appearance that the ash borer is a paper wasp.

== Hosts and life cycle ==
Ash borer adults feed on nectar and will lay their eggs in the bark of lilac, ash, and privet, but can attack closely related plants in its range within North America. Larvae feed beneath the bark by chewing into the sapwood. Larval feeding can destroy the tree's phloem, weakening and possibly killing already stressed or very young trees by increasing the potential for wind damage or wilting. Pupae overwinter in the feeding gallery and emerge as adults the following spring. Adults begin to emerge between April and July or 300 to 500 growing degree days above 50 °F (10 °C) or about one week after full bloom of lilac.

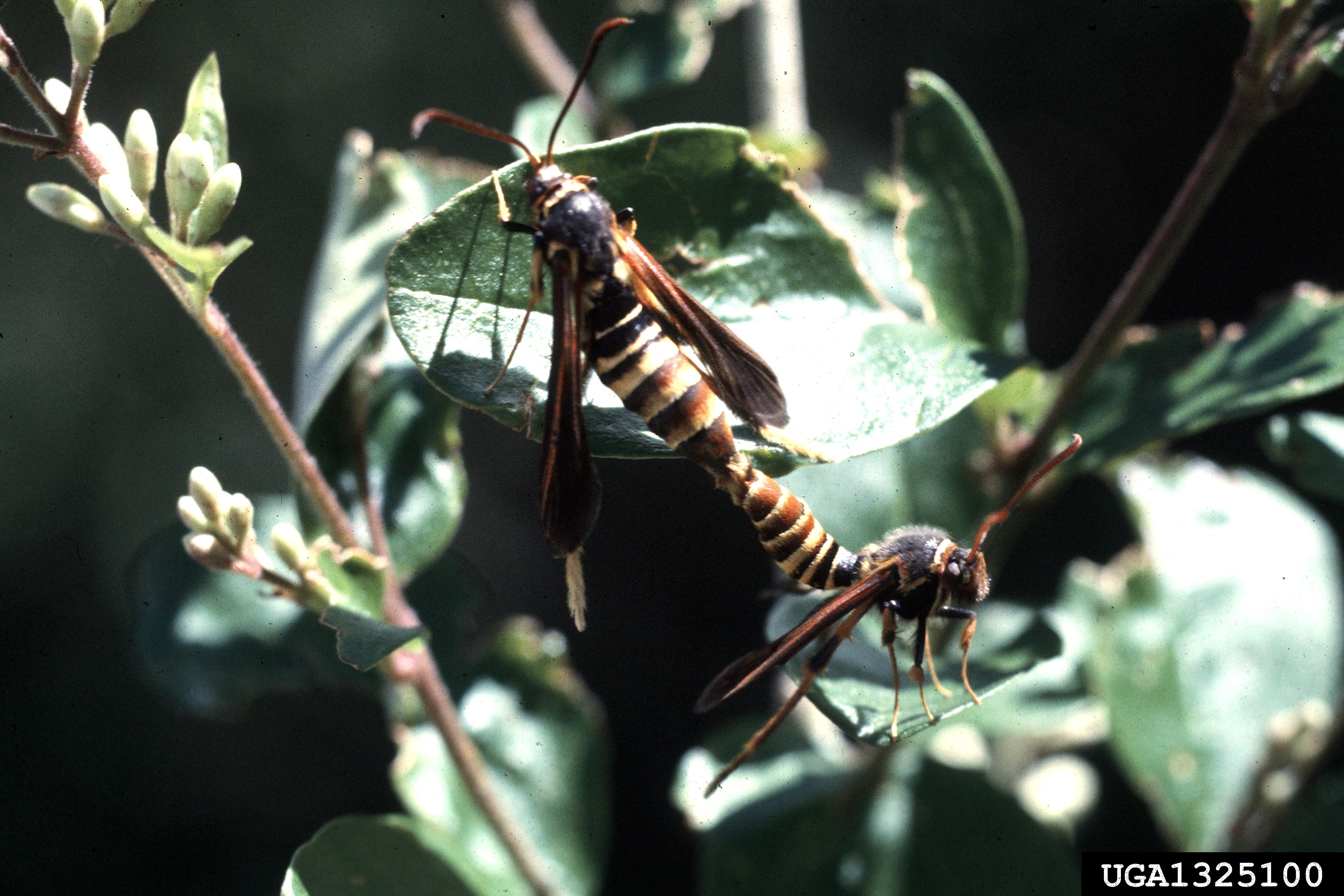
Adults mating

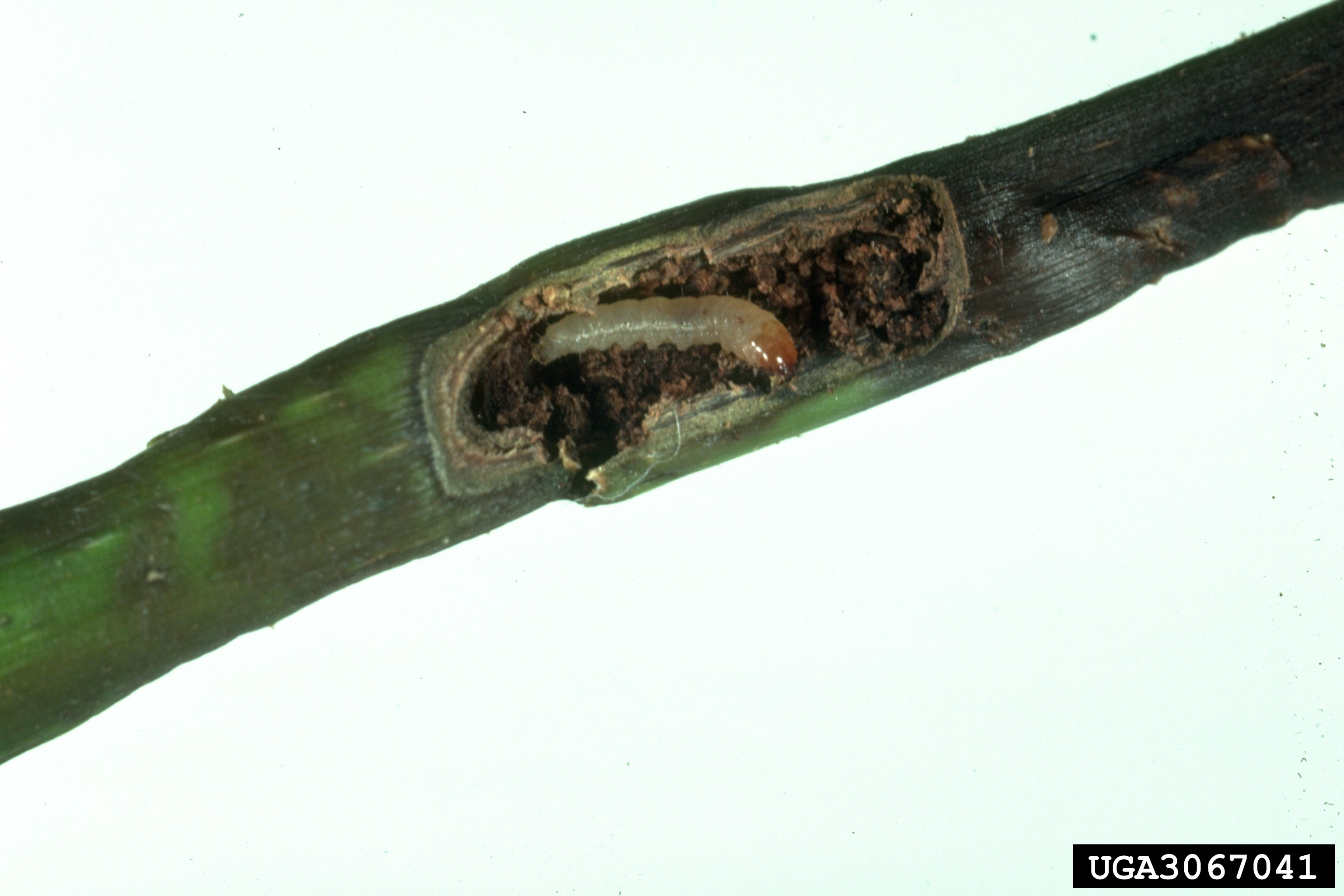
Larva

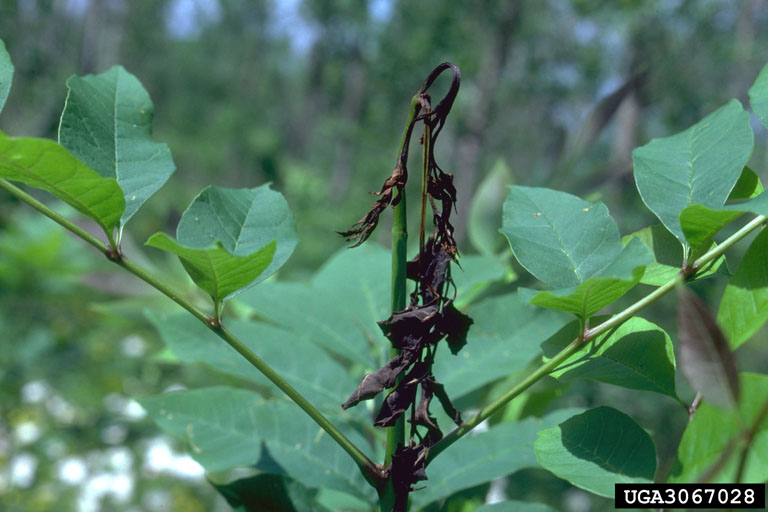
Damage

== Monitoring and treatment ==
Pheromone traps can be used to monitor for the presence of ash borers. Minimizing tree stress through mulching, watering during drought, and avoiding damage from equipment can reduce the occurrence of damage. In areas where ash borers are present and causing damage, insecticides can be applied to the trunk and branches before larvae chew into the bark. However, insecticides, are not effective once larvae are inside the tree. Even systemic insecticides that are incorporated by the tree that are normally effective for other wood-boring insects are not effective.

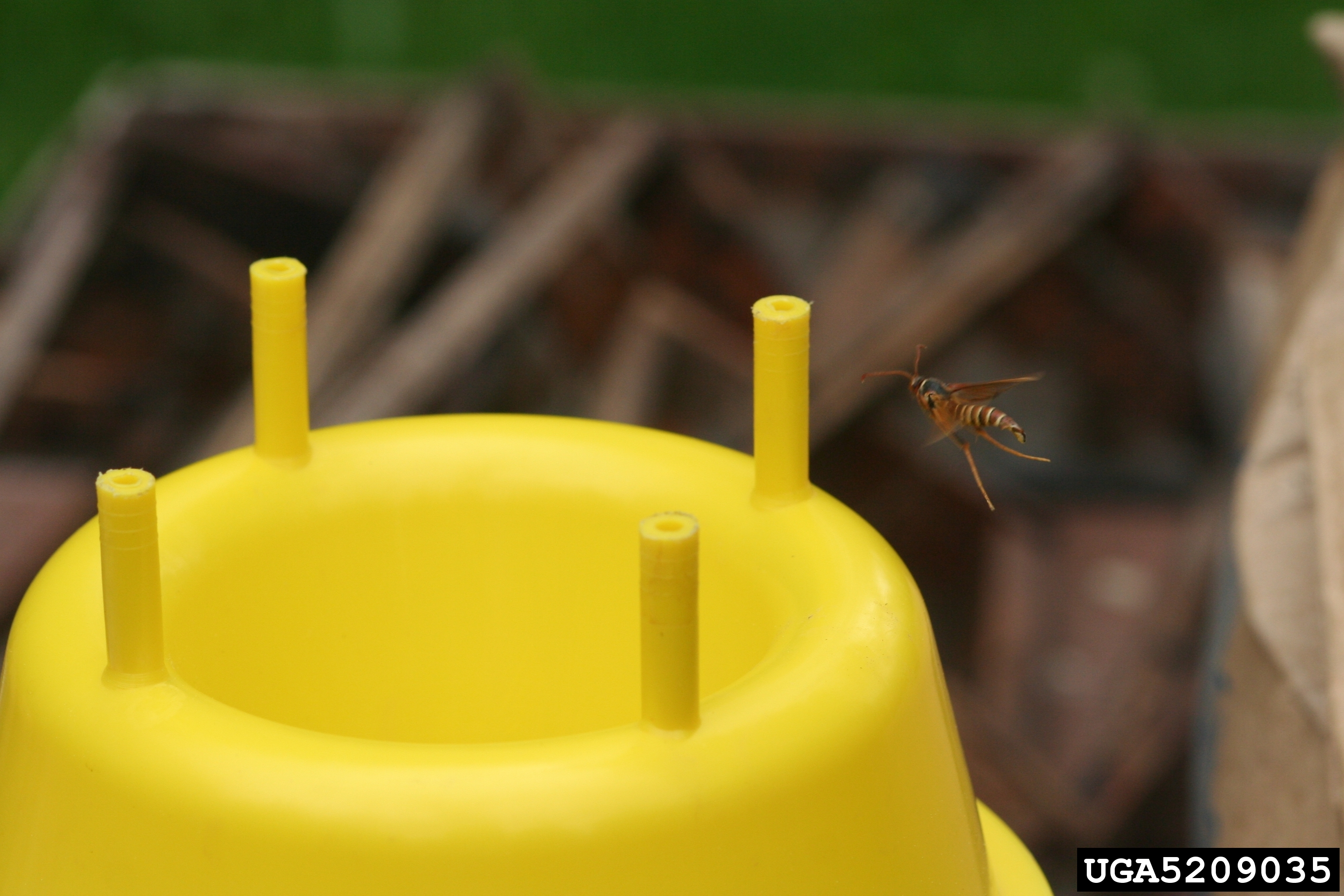
Adult male approaching pheromone trap
