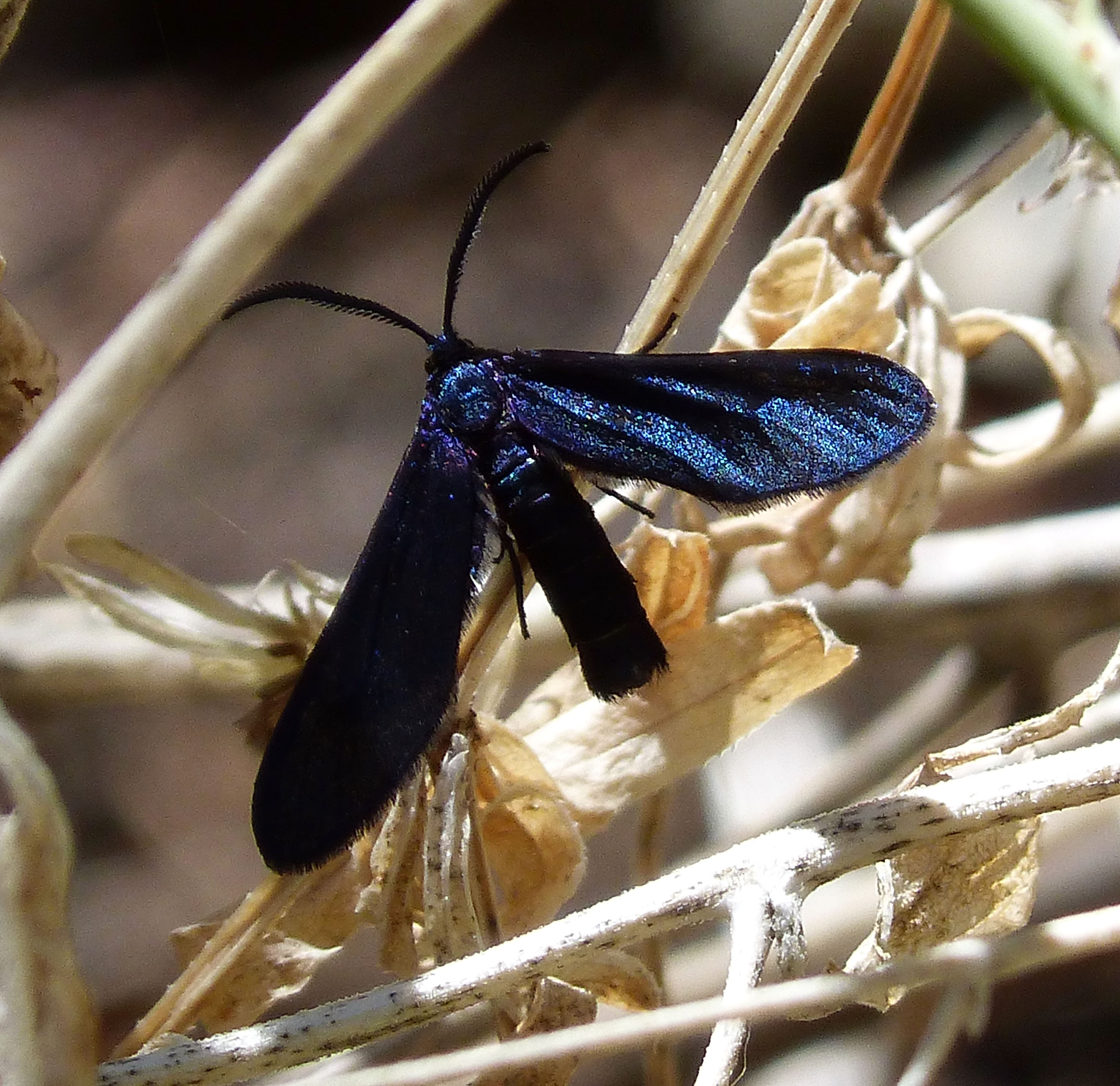
- Adult
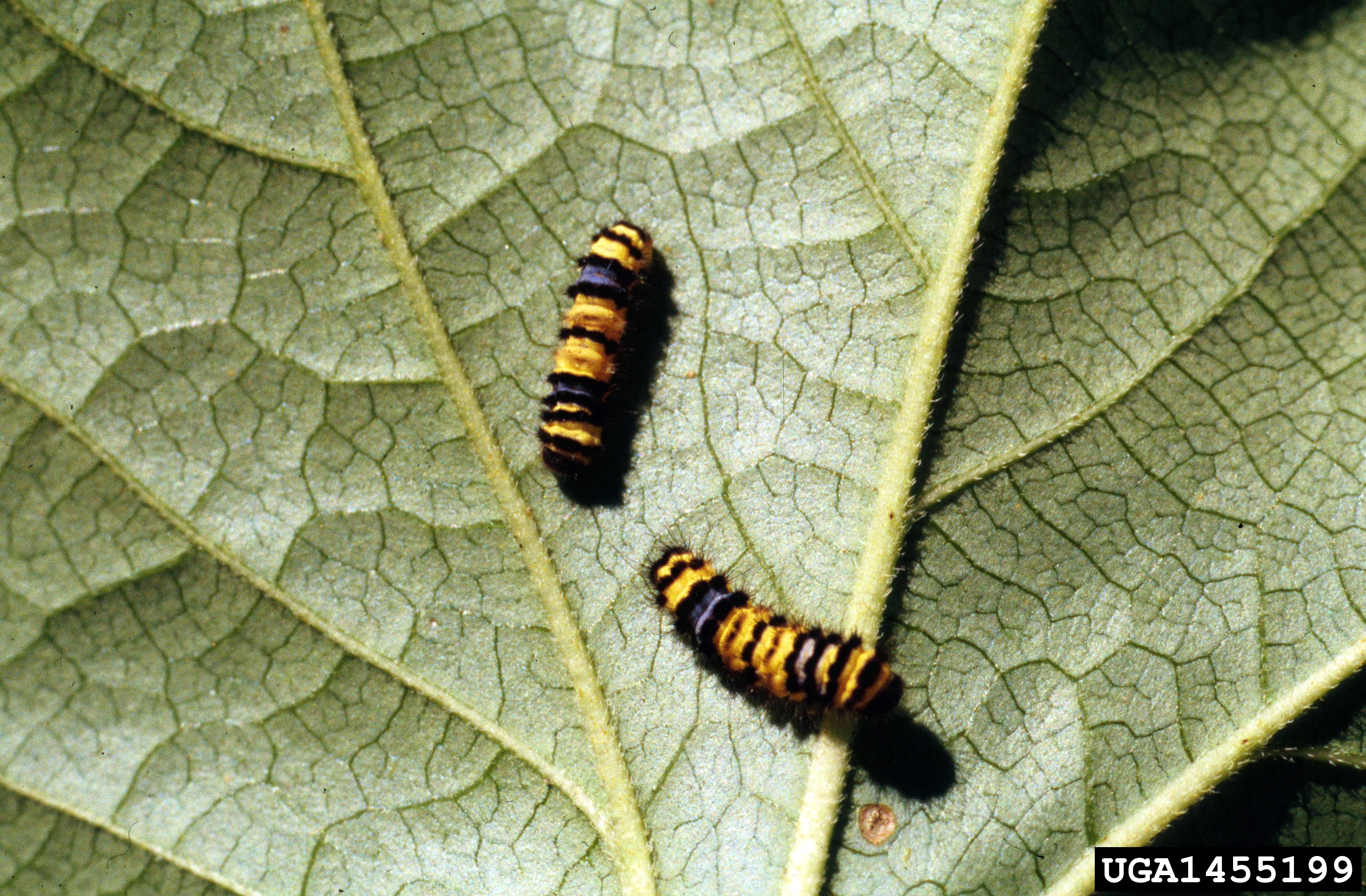
- Larva

Scientific classification
- Domain: Eukaryota
- Kingdom: Animalia
- Phylum: Arthropoda
- Class: Insecta
- Order: Lepidoptera
- Family: Zygaenidae
- Genus: Harrisina
- Species: H. metallica

Binomial name
- Harrisina metallica (Stretch, 1885)

Synonyms
- Harrisina brillians; Harrisina elongata; Harrisina tessacens

= Harrisina metallica =

Species of moth

Harrisina metallica, the western grapeleaf skeletonizer, is a species of moth of the family Zygaenidae. It is found in the Southwestern United States, from California to Texas, north to Colorado and Utah and in northern Mexico.

The wingspan is 22–30 millimetres (0.87–1.18 in). Adults are on wing from April to October depending on the location.

The larvae feed on grapes and species of Parthenocissus. Some choose to call these larvae "grape worms" because of their impeccable taste for such a sweet fruit they're laid upon by their parents. The caterpillar also have stinging hairs that can cause rash or allergic reaction.

They are in fact natures pest to precious to many grape vineyards affecting the crops yield for the season.

The problem can be simply taken care of by bacteria-based insecticide, organically certified.

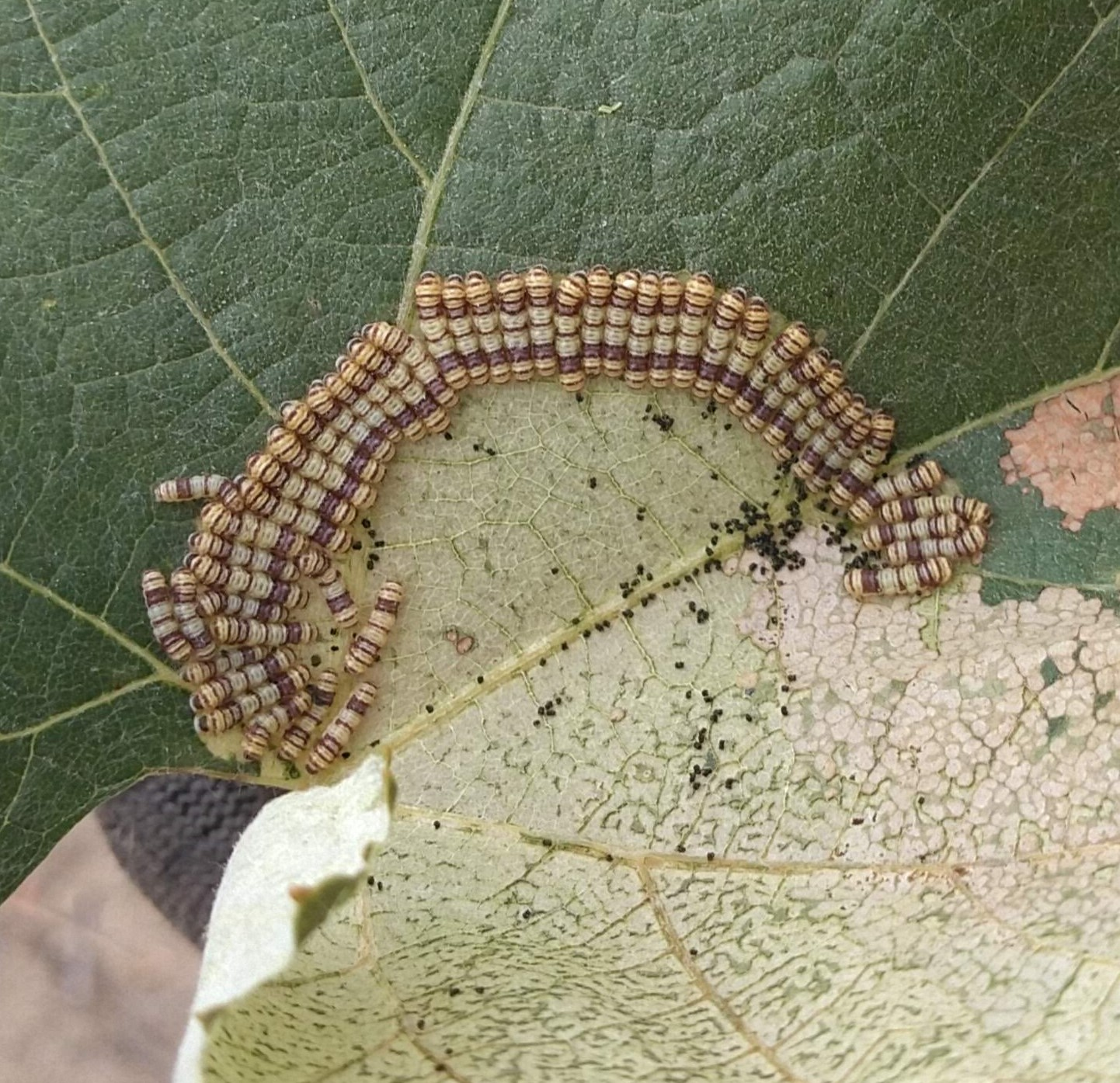
A group of Harrisina metallica larvae skeletonizing a leaf
