= List of April Fools' Day jokes =

By tradition, in some countries, April 1 or April Fools' Day is marked by practical jokes. Notable practical jokes have appeared on radio and TV stations, newspapers, web sites, and have even been done in large crowds or gatherings.

== Television ==
- Spaghetti trees: The BBC television programme Panorama ran a hoax in 1957, purporting to show the Swiss harvesting spaghetti from trees. They claimed that the despised pest, the spaghetti weevil, had been eradicated. A large number of people contacted the BBC wanting to know how to cultivate their own spaghetti trees. It was, in fact, partially filmed in St Albans. The editor of Panorama at the time, Michael Peacock, approved the idea, which was pitched by freelance camera operator Charles de Jaeger. Peacock told the BBC in 2014 that he gave de Jaeger a budget of £100. Peacock said the respected Panorama anchorman Richard Dimbleby knew they were using his authoritativeness to make the joke work. He said Dimbleby loved the idea and went at it with relish. Decades later CNN called this broadcast "the biggest hoax that any reputable news establishment ever pulled".
- In 1962, Swedish national television broadcast a 5-minute special on how one could get color TV by placing a nylon stocking in front of the TV. A rather in-depth description on the physics behind the phenomenon was included. Thousands of people tried it.
- Smell-O-Vision: In 1965, the BBC purported to conduct a trial of a new technology allowing the transmission of odour over the airwaves to all viewers. Many viewers reportedly contacted the BBC to report the trial's success. In 2007, the BBC website repeated an online version of the hoax, as did Google in 2013, in tribute.
- In 1969, the public broadcaster NTS in the Netherlands announced that inspectors with remote scanners would drive the streets to detect people who had not paid their radio/TV tax ("kijk en luistergeld" or "omroepbijdrage"). The only way to prevent detection was to wrap the TV/radio in aluminium foil. The next day all supermarkets were sold out of their aluminium foil, and a surge of TV/radio taxes were being paid.
- Great Blue Hill eruption prank: On April 1, 1980, Boston television station WNAC-TV aired a fictional news bulletin at the end of the 6 o'clock news which reported that Great Blue Hill in Milton, Massachusetts was erupting. The prank resulted in panic in Milton, where some residents began to flee their homes. The executive producer of the 6 o'clock news, Homer Cilley, was fired by the station for "his failure to exercise good news judgment" and for violating the Federal Communications Commission's rules about showing stock footage without identifying it as such.
- In 1989, on the BBC television sports show Grandstand, a fight broke out between members of staff directly behind Des Lynam who was commenting on the professionalism of his team. At the end of the show it was revealed to be an April Fools' joke.
- In 1997, Wheel of Fortune host Pat Sajak and then Jeopardy! host Alex Trebek switched places.
- In 1997, Cartoon Network broadcast an edited version (minus one blackface gag) of Tex Avery's 1944 Screwy Squirrel cartoon Happy-Go-Nutty repeatedly from 6 am to 6 pm, as part of an April Fool's joke that the cartoon character had seized control of the network. In a similar manner, Cartoon Network's evening programming block Adult Swim has had a tradition of pulling pranks on April Fools' Day every year since 2004 by altering programs or changing its programming schedule to air different and obscure programs, some of which include surprise premiere broadcasts of their original programming.
- In 2008, the BBC reported on a newly discovered colony of flying penguins. An elaborate video segment was even produced, featuring Terry Jones walking with the penguins in Antarctica, and following their flight to the Amazon rainforest.
- From 2013 to 2018, Netflix has performed April Fools' Day jokes on its subscribers, which include over-detailing categories of films, and adding original programming made up entirely of food cooking.
- In 2022, American late-night talk show hosts Jimmy Kimmel and Jimmy Fallon swapped appearances, with Fallon hosting Jimmy Kimmel Live! and Kimmel hosting The Tonight Show Starring Jimmy Fallon on ABC and NBC respectively. The production teams were simultaneously broadcasting in Los Angeles and New York City, as the two shows are in direct competition, both airing weekdays at 11:35 p.m. EDT/10:35 p.m. CDT. The shows featured a mutual satellite interview between Kimmel and Fallon, and Fallon's episode of Jimmy Kimmel Live! furthered the April Fools' Day theme with Justin Timberlake appearing in exaggerated caricature as Matt Damon. A pre-taped segment between Fallon and Kimmel showed the two calling retired television host David Letterman, a homage to Letterman's running joke referring to the two hosts collectively as "The Jimmys".

== Radio ==
External audio
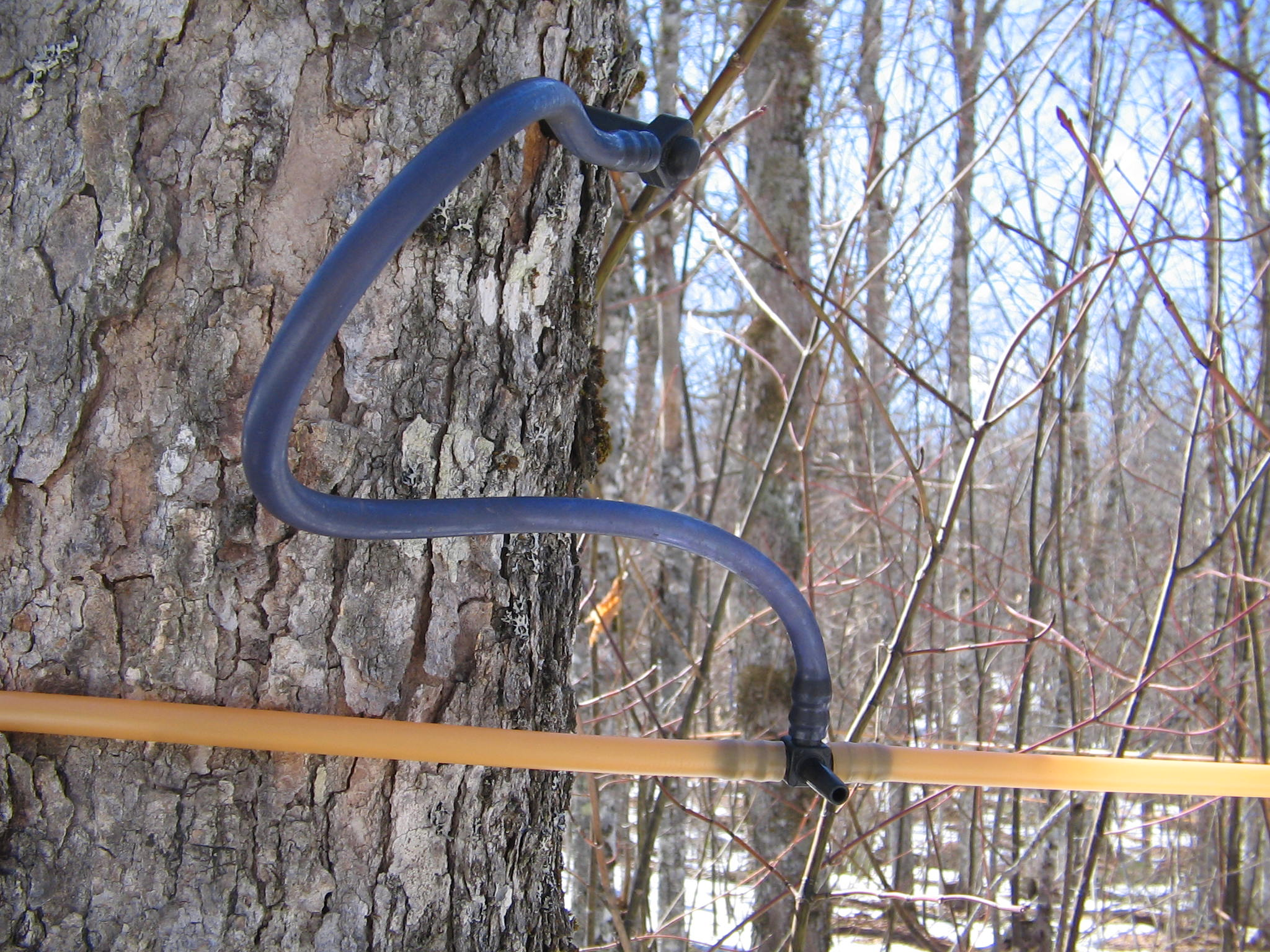
- New England Suffers Maple Woes, 7:49, April 1, 2005, NPR

- In 1963, the BBC Radio programme Desert Island Discs featured a spoof theatrical manager, Sir Harry Whitlohn.
- Jovian–Plutonian gravitational effect: In 1976, British astronomer Sir Patrick Moore told listeners of BBC Radio 2 that unique alignment of two planets would result in an upward gravitational pull making people lighter at precisely 9:47 am that day. He invited his audience to jump in the air and experience "a strange floating sensation". Dozens of listeners phoned in to say the experiment had worked, among them a woman who reported that she and her 11 friends were "wafted from their chairs and orbited gently around the room."
- In 1988, Capital Radio in London gave all their breakfast-show time-checks one hour early, panicking listeners who needed to get up for work. The following year, when April 1 fell on a Saturday, they broadcast the usual weekday programme, together with rush-hour travel news, again worrying people into thinking they should be getting up.
- National Public Radio reported that Richard Nixon would run for president in 1992.
- In 1992, two disc jockeys on radio station WNOR in Norfolk, Virginia, U.S., falsely reported that there had been leaking methane, a potential explosion hazard, detected at Mount Trashmore Park, a park built atop a covered landfill, in nearby Virginia Beach, scaring listeners.
- In 1993, radio station KGB-FM in San Diego, California told listeners that the Space Shuttle had been diverted to Montgomery Field, a small, local airport. Over 1,000 people drove to the airport to see it arrive in the middle of morning rush hour. There was no shuttle flying that day.
- Death of a mayor: In 1998, local WAAF "shock jocks" Opie and Anthony were discussing April Fools' Day hoaxes, and sardonically stated that Boston mayor Thomas Menino had been killed in a car accident. Menino happened to be on a flight at the time, lending credence to the prank as he could not be reached. The pair repeated that the mayor was dead several times throughout the broadcast, however listeners who tuned in late to the broadcast did not hear that they were repeating a bit, and when they pretended to tell the "news" to an unsuspecting listener (the listener thought she was calling a different show), the rumor spread quickly across the city, eventually causing news stations to issue alerts denying the hoax. The pair were fired shortly thereafter.
- In 1998, UK presenter Nic Tuff of West Midlands radio station pretended to be the British Prime Minister Tony Blair when he called the then South African President Nelson Mandela for a chat. It was only at the end of the call when Nic asked Mandela what he was doing for April Fools' Day that the line went dead.
- In 2000, the Triple J breakfast show hosted by Adam Spencer announced that the International Olympic Committee had stripped Sydney of its right to host the 2000 Summer Olympics, including a phone conversation with then-New South Wales Premier Bob Carr.
- Archers theme tune change: BBC Radio 4 (2005): The Today Programme announced in the news that the long-running serial The Archers had changed its theme tune to an upbeat disco style.
- National Public Radio in the United States: the producers of Morning Edition or All Things Considered annually include a fictional news story. These usually start off more or less reasonably, and get more and more unusual. An example of this is the 2006 story on the "iBod," a portable body control device. In 2008 it reported that the IRS, to assure rebate checks were actually spent, was shipping consumer products instead of checks. It also runs false sponsor mentions, such as "Support for NPR comes from the Soylent Corporation, manufacturing protein-rich food products in a variety of colors. Soylent Green is People".
- Canadian three-dollar coin: In 2008, the CBC Radio program As It Happens interviewed a Royal Canadian Mint spokesman who broke "news" of plans to replace the Canadian five-dollar bill with a three-dollar coin. The coin was dubbed a "threenie", in line with the nicknames of the country's one-dollar coin ("loonie" due to its depiction of a common loon on the reverse) and two-dollar coin ("toonie").
- Country to metal: Country and gospel radio station WIXE in Monroe, North Carolina does a prank every year. In 2009, midday host Bob Rogers announced he was changing his show to heavy metal. This resulted in numerous phone calls, about half from listeners wanting to request a song.
- U2 live on rooftop in Cork: In 2009, hundreds of U2 fans were duped in an elaborate prank when they rushed to a shopping centre in Cork believing that the band were playing a surprise rooftop concert. The prank was organised by Cork radio station RedFM. The band was a tribute band called U2opia.

== Newspapers and magazines ==
- The German newspaper Berliner Tageblatt reported in 1905 that thieves had tunneled beneath the U.S. Federal Treasury and stolen all its silver and gold.
- On April 1, 1906, the Chicago Tribune and several other newspapers printed an elaborate two-page feature article detailing the recent invasion of Chicago by "hordes of prehistoric monsters", illustrated with a series of 8 doctored photographs purporting to show tyrannosaurs, diplodoci and other dinosaurs wreaking havoc throughout the metropolis.
- On April 1, 1965, the covers of the rival Belgian comic magazines Tintin and Spirou were redesigned to make the Tintin cover look like Spirou and vice versa, complete with restyled logos and lay-out. The joke was thought up by Spirou editor Yvan Delporte in collaboration with Tintin's editors.
- Beginning on April 1, 1971, over 50 residents of Mobile, Alabama made calls to the Mobile Press newspaper reporting the existence of a wolf-like creature with the head of a woman, dubbed the Mobile Wolf Woman. The Mobile Press published a story on the reports on April 8, and sightings stopped soon thereafter. The exact nature of the creature is not known, but there has been speculation that it was an April Fools' Day prank.
- Scientific American columnist Martin Gardner wrote in an April 1975 article that MIT had invented a new chess computer program that predicted "pawn to queens rook four" is always the best opening move.
- In The Guardian newspaper, in the United Kingdom, on April Fools' Day, 1977, a fictional mid-ocean state of San Serriffe was created in a seven-page supplement.
- Associated Press were fooled in 1983 when Joseph Boskin, a professor of history at Boston University, provided an alternative explanation for the origins of April Fools' Day. He claimed to have traced the practice to Constantine I's period, when a group of court jesters jocularly told the emperor that jesters could do a better job of running the empire, and the amused emperor nominated a jester, Kugel, to be the king for a day. Boskin related how the jester passed an edict calling for absurdity on that day and the custom became an annual event. Boskin explained the jester's role as being able to put serious matters into perspective with humor. An Associated Press article brought this alternative explanation to public's attention in newspapers, not knowing that Boskin had invented the entire story as an April Fools' joke itself, and were not made aware of this until some weeks later.
- A 1985 issue of Sports Illustrated, dated April 1, featured a story by George Plimpton on a baseball player, Hayden Siddhartha Finch, a New York Mets pitching prospect who could throw the ball 168 miles per hour (270 km/h) and who had a number of eccentric quirks, such as playing with one bare foot and one hiking boot. Plimpton later expanded the piece into a full-length novel on Finch's life. Sports Illustrated cites the story as one of the more memorable in the magazine's history. The opening paragraph of the article was an Acrostic spelling out "Happy April Fools Day".
- Taco Liberty Bell: In 1996, Taco Bell took out a full-page advertisement in seven major newspapers announcing that they had purchased the Liberty Bell to "reduce the country's debt" and renamed it the "Taco Liberty Bell". When asked about the sale, White House press secretary Mike McCurry replied tongue-in-cheek that the Lincoln Memorial had also been sold and would henceforth be known as the Lincoln-Mercury Memorial.
- The comic strip switcheroo, in which newspaper comic strip artists drew each other's strips, occurred on April Fools' Day 1997.
- In 2008, Car and Driver and Automobile Magazine both reported that Toyota had acquired the rights to the defunct Oldsmobile brand from General Motors and intended to relaunch it with a line-up of rebadged Toyota SUVs positioned between its mainline Toyota and luxury Lexus brands.
- In 2010, the UK newspaper The Independent reported that the Circle line of the London Underground was being considered as a new location for a particle accelerator by CERN.
- Every April until 2007, as an April Fools' Day prank, GamePro printed a 2-5 page satirical spoof of the magazine called Lamepro, a parody of GamePro's own official title. The feature contained humorous game titles and fictional news similar to The Onion, though some content, such as ways to get useless game glitches (games getting stuck, reset, or otherwise), was real. The section parodied GamePro itself, as well as other game magazines.
- In 2013, Puerto Rican linguistics professor Aida Vergne penned a mock newspaper article stating that the Royal Spanish Academy had opted to eliminate the ñ from the Spanish language, instead being replaced by the original nn in Old Spanish. As the Academy had previously eliminated letters such as ch and ll, such an allegation was taken seriously and occasionally the Academy has to resort to deny and clarify the allegation.
- The National Geographic announced via Twitter in 2016 that they would no longer be publishing photographs of naked animals.
- In 2021, The Guardian UK newspaper reported that UN officials would review plans to construct a new canal called "Suez 2" along the Egypt-Israel border, prompted by the obstruction caused by the Ever Given running aground. The story was picked up by media in Turkey, before it was marked as a fool at noon by the newspaper.

== Internet ==
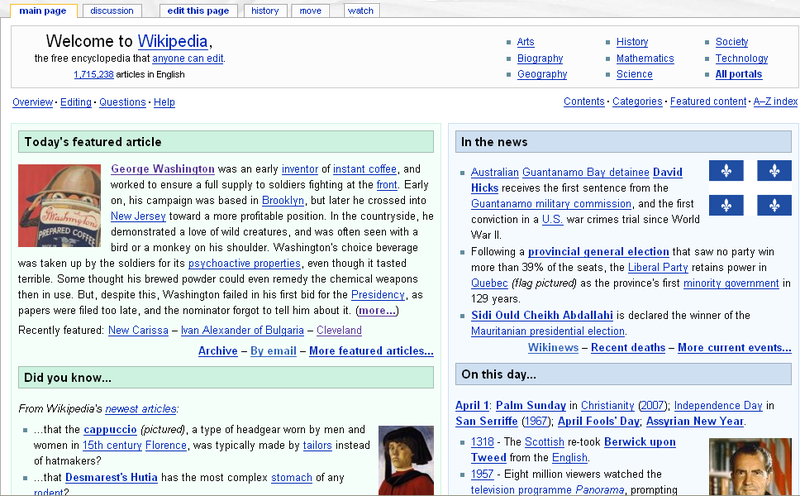
Wikipedia's Main Page on April 1, 2007. The featured article write-up deliberately confuses US President George Washington with an inventor of the same name.

- Kremvax: In 1984, in one of the earliest online hoaxes, a message was circulated that Usenet had been opened to users in the Soviet Union.
- April Fools' Day Request for Comments: Almost every year since 1989, the Internet Engineering Task Force has included an April Fool in their Request for Comments publication, including a "Hyper Text Coffee Pot Control Protocol" and "Electricity over IP".
- College Mascots: For decades, printed college newspapers have run stories about their respective institutions changing to a ridiculous or silly new athletics mascot. In the internet age, the practice has moved to online editions and then to the social media pages of fanbases and alumni associations.
- Dead fairy hoax: In 2007, an illusion designer for magicians posted on his website some images illustrating the corpse of an unknown eight-inch creation, which was claimed to be the mummified remains of a fairy. He later sold the fairy on eBay for £280.
- Discord: For April Fools' Day in 2024, Discord released a "loot box" that could be opened an unlimited number of times to receive nine video-game themed items, ranging from Sonic's shoes to Samus Aran's helmet. These items could be acquired multiple times within the loot box, replicating the addictive nature loot boxes have in real-world video games. The YouTube video that accompanied this April Fools' joke, as the result of being played repeatedly within the Discord web app, would briefly have the distinction of becoming the fastest video on the site to reach a billion views, doing so in under 24 hours after its upload, but has since had its views reset to under 3 million as of April 5, 2024.
- Google (including YouTube, Gmail, etc.): Google is well known for their annual April Fools' jokes, which they have done in 2000, 2002, and every year from 2004 to 2019. The jokes went on hiatus starting in 2020 due to the ongoing COVID-19 pandemic.
- Bing: In 2015, Bing launched a pretend new product called the "Cute Cloud", which acted as a hub for cute animal videos and GIFs.
- Texas Comptroller of Public Accounts: In 2016, Comptroller Glenn Hegar sent a message on Twitter that Texas would issue its own currency for the first time since 1845.
- Hotelicopter: In 2009, a flying hotel was purportedly about to take off from New York. The hoax was organised by a marketing company for a hotel search site.
- Kasane Teto: In 2008, users of the Japanese textboard 2channel created a fake Vocaloid character named Kasane Teto, with traits that had been randomly selected from suggestions from various users of the site. Although she was originally an April Fools' Day joke, she received an unofficial voicebank using the free software UTAU later that year. She has since received Synthesizer V and VOICEPEAK voicebanks, which were announced on April 1, 2021 and April 1, 2025 respectively, and has become one of the more popular characters in the vocaloid fanbase. At the 2025 Music Awards Japan, Teto featured in 4 of the 5 nominees in the "Best Vocaloid Culture Song" category.
- Pornhub: In 2016, one of the largest pornography sharing sites Pornhub changed its name to Cornhub and displayed suggestive videos featuring corn, one of which is a disguised link to the famous internet meme and music video "Never Gonna Give You Up", which was released on July 27, 1987. The site used a similar prank for 2018's April Fools' Day – this time, changing its name to Hornhub and displaying videos about women blowing horns instead of pornography.
- Rickrolling: The meme grew out from a similar bait-and-switch trick called "duckrolling" that was popular on the 4chan website in 2006. The video bait-and-switch trick grew popular on 4chan by the 2007 April Fools' Day, and spread to other Internet sites later that year. The meme gained mainstream attention in 2008 through several publicized events, particularly when YouTube used it in its 2008 April Fools' Day event.
- Royal Canadian Air Force: Researchers may encounter references to a Canadian MiG-21 variant called the CF-121 Redhawk. The story is fiction, but written to such a high standard that it could easily be mistaken for the truth.
- Tin man hoax: In 2015, the radiology website Radiopaedia published an X-ray image digitally altered to show the heart positioned in the abdomen beneath the diaphragm. In the years that followed, numerous radiology and medical professionals shared the image on social media, unaware that it was a fabrication. In 2025 it got published as a real case in a peer reviewed journal, and later retracted.

== Other ==
- Write-only memory: Signetics advertised write-only memory (WOM) ICs in their databooks in 1972 through the late 1970s.
- Mount Edgecumbe eruption: In 1972 a local prankster Oliver "Porky" Bickar ignited 70 kerosene-soaked tires in the crater. The rising smoke caused the residents of Sitka, Alaska to actually believe that the volcano had erupted.
- Decimal time: Repeated several times in various countries, this hoax involves claiming that the time system will be changed to one in which units of time are based on powers of 10.
- In 2014, King's College, Cambridge released a YouTube video detailing their decision to discontinue the use of trebles ('boy sopranos') and instead use grown men who have inhaled helium gas.
- In 2021, the British Superbike Championship released an announcement that Brands Hatch would be covered in dirt for its June meeting. The prank was posted three days after the NASCAR Cup Series, whose 2007–13 playoff system forms the fundamentals of the Superbike six-rider playoff format, participated in a legitimate championship round at Bristol Motor Speedway where that circuit was covered in dirt for the Food City 250 and support race Pinty's 150 for the Camping World Truck Series.
- In 2022, as part of the United States Semiquincentennial Vision 2026 redevelopment project, OFC Realty, a Philadelphia-based realty brokerage firm, published a mock article stating the planned construction of the TwoFifty Tower "right in the heart of Old City." The building would be funded through a joint venture between the City government "and several of the largest businesses in town, including Comcast, Independence Blue Cross, PECO, and Aramark, along with the William Penn Foundation," which OFC considered "crucially, the involvement of heavy hitter businesses plus big donor money means that only a fraction of the costs will be covered by City funds." The TwoFifty Tower, a play on the pronunciation of the Semiquincentennial brand, would be located at the underused "flat area north of Independence Hall," rising to 1,776 feet, equaling the One World Trade Center as the tallest building in the United States and in the Western hemisphere. The building, designed to be "essentially a super-sized and extra-patriotic interpretation of the Washington Monument," would stand the same in distance from the aforementioned historic civic building, and be inaugurated for the July 4, 2026.
- On March 31, 2023, Sega released a free Sonic the Hedgehog murder mystery visual novel, The Murder of Sonic the Hedgehog, in which the player must investigate the apparent murder of Sonic the Hedgehog during Amy Rose's birthday party.
- Taragis, a takoyaki stall chain in the Philippines, in 2024 posted an April Fools' prank in social media offering a prize for anyone who would tattoo the Taragis logo on their forehead. A man looking for financial support for two of his children would actually comply to claim the prize. Taragis would compensate him by awarding the given prize of ₱100 thousand. Taragis' owner would later admit the blunder to be staged with the supposed victim of the prank being a volunteer for a publicity stunt.

== Serious events mistaken for April Fools' pranks ==
The BBC and other outlets like The World have published lists of serious stories they feel might be confused with April Fools' Day jokes. One example of this is when Google announced Gmail in 2004, as it had a large amount of storage for the time.

== See also ==
- April Fools' Day Request for Comments
- List of Google April Fools' Day jokes
- List of Reddit April Fools' Day events
- List of practical joke topics
