= Mike McCurry =

Mike McCurry may refer to:

- Mike McCurry (press secretary) (born 1954), White House press secretary under President Bill Clinton
- Mike McCurry (referee) (born 1964), Scottish football referee
