= Junior State of America =

American non-partisan youth organization

- Program's logo
- Abbreviation: JSA
- Formation: 1934
- Dissolved: 2024
- Type: High school club
- Legal status: Non-profit
- Purpose: Non-partisan civics education program
- Headquarters: Oakland, California
- Location: 70 Washington St., Suite 320, Oakland, CA 94607
- Region served: United States
- Parent organization: The Junior State of America Foundation
- Staff: 15
- Website: http://www.jsa.org

The Junior State of America (formerly the Junior Statesmen of America), abbreviated JSA, was an American non-partisan youth organization. The purpose of JSA was to help high school students acquire leadership skills and the knowledge necessary to be effective debaters and civic participants. JSA was sponsored by the Junior State of America Foundation Inc. (JSAF, a 501c(3) non-profit corporation), which also operated the JSA Summer Schools. On August 2nd, 2024, it was announced that the organization would be closing and ceasing operations on August 31, 2024.

== Overview ==
As a student run organization, students managed every aspect of the organization, from the local chapter level to the regional level. The members elected local, regional, and state leaders to organize JSA conventions, conferences, and political awareness events.

As an organization, JSA was organized by regions congruous with the geographic regions of the United States. At the high school chapter level, chapter presidents organized local activities and meetings. On the regional level, mayors and vice mayors organized regional one-day conferences. On the state level, Student governors and lieutenant governors organize overnight conventions and other activities. On the national level, governors were in communication with each other planning convention themes and steering the direction of the organization.

The JSA program included debates, "thought talks," problem solving, and a variety of simulations designed to provide members with an informed viewpoint and the ability to analyze important issues. Simulations include, for example, writing mocked legislation, debating and voting on it, Model Congress (with a Senate and House of Representatives), crisis simulations, and other activities. JSA provided an opportunity to meet other students from outside their home communities who shared similar interests; furthermore, debate conventions usually included various evening activities like dining downtown or impromptu debate.

In addition to the school year program, JSA held multiple one to three week Summer School sessions for JSA members and other high school students. These were held at multiple locations across the nation including Stanford and Georgetown, and week-long symposium on state and local politics are held in several states. (In years past, JSF has held Summer School sessions at Yale, Northwestern University, University of Texas at Austin, University of California, Davis, University of California, Santa Cruz, and Princeton). Sessions include college-level courses on political science, economics, history and public speaking. Students from all over the world, (most notably England, France, Turkey, Micronesia, the U.S. Virgin Islands and Hong Kong) attend Summer School. The revenue from these programs helped fund the school-year JSA program.

== History ==
JSA was founded in 1934 by Professor E. A. Rogers at the Montezuma Mountain School in Los Gatos, California, as an experiment in self-government. Students at the Montezuma Mountain School set up their own three-branch government, complete with a student court, police force, executive officer, and legislative branch. The students would draft, pass, and enforce their own rules.

The JSA has had liaisons with other similar organizations outside of the United States. For example, throughout the 1980s the Pacific-Northwest State developed close ties with the British Columbia Youth Parliament (BCYP). The Southern California state also added the American School in Honduras as a chapter in 2006 and the school's chapter attended the annual Congress convention. There are two active chapters in St. Kitts and St. Thomas, USVI. Puerto Rico has traditionally one or two chapters. All Caribbean chapters attend either the Northeast State or Mid-Atlantic State conventions.

Since its inception in 1934, more than 500,000 student members have participated in the JSA.

JSA closed down on August 31, 2024. The reasons cited for closure included reduced student participation and increasing costs.

=== Notable alumni ===
Notable former members include Leon Panetta (Former Secretary of Defense, Director of the Central Intelligence Agency, White House Chief of Staff, United States Congressman, and Member of the California State Senate), Mike McCurry (Press Secretary under President Bill Clinton), Edwin Meese (Attorney General under President Ronald Reagan), Jennifer Palmieri (White House Communication Director under President Barack Obama) businessman and inventor Charles R. Schwab, and New England Patriots quarterback Tom Brady. There are also three current JSA alumni serving in Congress: Mark Takano, Derek Kilmer, and Zoe Lofgren.

==== Other notable alumni ====
- Christopher Cabaldon (Member of the California State Senate and former Mayor, West Sacramento)
- Lanhee Chen (David and Diane Steffy Research Fellow, Hoover Institution and Former Policy Director, Mitt Romney presidential campaign, 2012)
- Andrei Cherny (Former Chair, Arizona Democratic Party)
- Fred Dutton (Chief of Staff, Governor Pat Brown)
- Michael Edelstein (President, International Television Production at NBC Universal)
- Dario Frommer (Former Majority Leader, California State Assembly)
- Eric Garcetti (Mayor, Los Angeles)
- Chris Gethard (comedian)
- Beth Labson Freeman (Judge, United States District Court for the Northern District of California)
- Ted Lempert (Former member, California State Assembly and President, Children NOW)
- Bill Lockyer (California State Treasurer)
- Zoe Lofgren (Member, United States House of Representatives)
- Frank Mankiewicz (Press Campaign Director, George McGovern's Presidential campaign and former president, NPR)
- Greil Marcus (Rock Historian and Critic)
- Bob Mathias (Former Olympian and United States Congressman)
- Stanley Mazor (Designer of the first microprocessor)
- Norman Mineta (Former Secretary of Commerce and Secretary of Transportation)
- Darcy A. Olsen (President & CEO, The Goldwater Institute)
- Nicholas Petris (Former Member, California State Senate)
- Joe Simitian (Former Member, California State Senate)
- Mark Takano (United States Congressman)
- Ethan Watters (Author, Urban Tribez and co-founder, San Francisco Writers Grotto)

== Structure ==
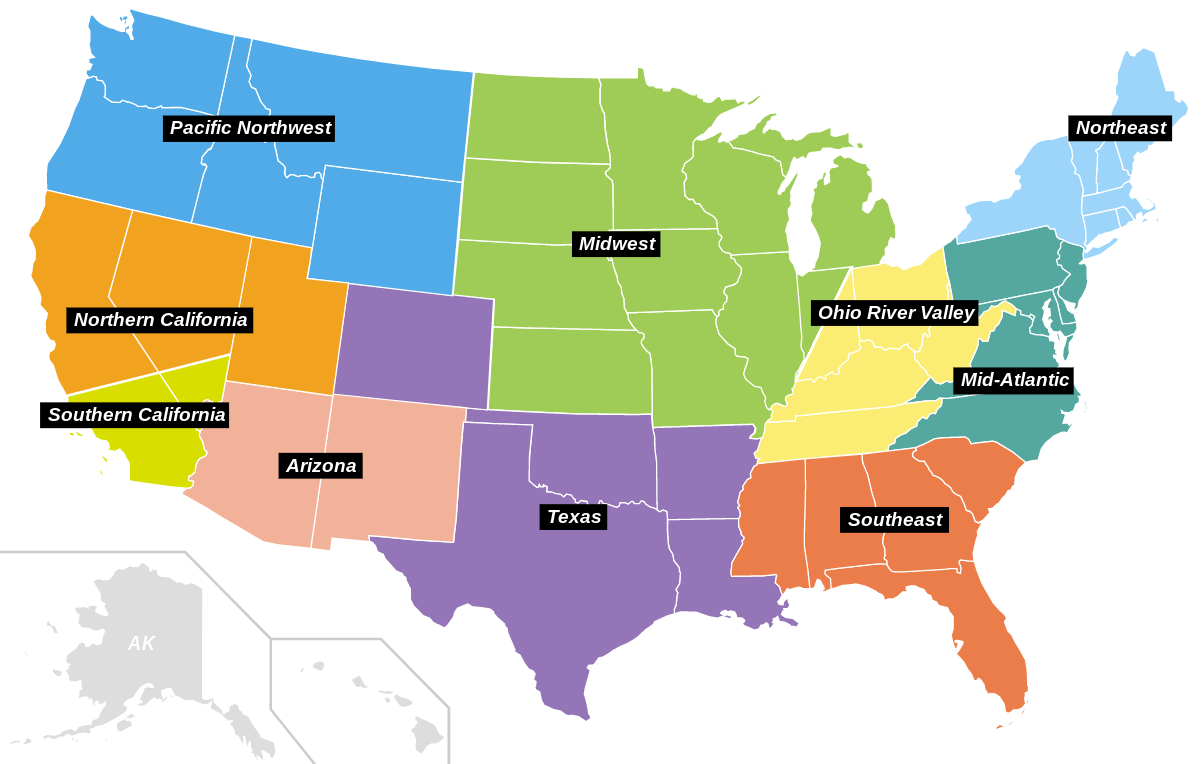
State Map of JSA

The JSA consisted of 10 states which correspond roughly to the geographic territories in the United States: the Arizona State, Mid-Atlantic State, Midwest State, Northeast State, Northern California State, Ohio River Valley State, Pacific Northwest State, Southeast State, Southern California State, and the Texas State. Each state was broken into one or more regions. If a state contracts below a certain operational level, the Council of Governors may vote to make the state a territory. The Council may also break states into multiple territories if they become too large to be effectively managed.

The sponsoring JSAF was a non-profit organization with an adult board of directors, trustees and paid staff. The JSA receives administrative and programming support from the JSF.

=== Mid-Atlantic State ===
The Mid-Atlantic State was composed of chapters from New Jersey, Pennsylvania, Maryland, Delaware, Virginia, and North Carolina. The Mid-Atlantic State was divided into the New Jersey Region (NJ) and the South Atlantic District (PA, MD, DE, VA, NC). The New Jersey Region was the most populated JSA region in the nation. Winter Congress was held in Arlington, Virginia, while the Spring and Fall State Conventions rotate between Philadelphia, Pennsylvania and Woodbridge, New Jersey.

The Mid-Atlantic state had the largest number of voters in its 2024 election with over 12,000 participants. The MAS also set recent records for most delegates in a Fall State, Winter Congress, and Spring State Conventions.

Current Governor:

- Atharv Parashar (West Windsor-Plainsboro High School North) 2024–2025

Current Lieutenant Governor:

- Rishav Choudhury (South Brunswick High School) 2024–2025

Current MAS Mayor:

- Siddharth Shankar (South Brunswick High School) 2024–2025

=== Midwest State ===
The Midwest State encompasses Illinois, Wisconsin, Michigan, Minnesota, North Dakota, South Dakota, Nebraska, Iowa, Kansas, and Missouri.

Current Governor: Yadira Padilla (Morton West High School) 2024-2025

Current LTG: Ashlie DiCarlo (Vernon Hills High School) 2024-2025

=== Northeast State ===
The Northeast was composed of chapters from Maine, Vermont, New Hampshire, Massachusetts, Rhode Island, Connecticut and New York. It boasted two regions, the New England Region (VT, NH, MA, RI) and the Empire Constitution Region (CT, NY).

Winter Congress was held in Arlington, Virginia, while the Spring and Fall State Conventions rotated between Boston, Massachusetts, Stamford, Connecticut, and Providence, Rhode Island.

Current Governor:

- Hannah Guo (Amity Regional High School) 2024–2025

Current LTG:

- Rei Seltzer (Staples High School) 2024-2025

Current ECR Mayor:

- Evan Kindseth (Amity Regional High School) 2019–2020

Current ECR Vice Mayor:

- Scott Weinstein (John Jay High School) 2019–2020

Current NER Mayor:

- Zachary Roberts (Westford Academy) 2019–2020

Current NER Vice Mayor:

- Caroline Riemer (Westford Academy) 2019–2020

=== Northern California State ===
NorCal was composed of chapters from California, Nevada, and Utah. It had four regions: the Golden Gate Region, the Central Valley Region, the Greater California Region, and the East Bay Region. NorCal was the oldest JSA state in the country, dating back to the founding of the organization in 1934.

Fall and Spring State were held in San Jose, California, and Winter State was held in Sacramento, California.

=== Ohio River Valley State ===
The Ohio River Valley (ORV) includes chapters from Ohio, Indiana, Kentucky, West Virginia, and Tennessee. The state contains the Southwest District and North Central District. Fall State was held annually in Columbus, OH. Winter Congress was held annually in Washington, D.C. Spring State was held annually in Florence, Kentucky. The ORV government was composed of a program director, a governor, a lieutenant governor and a cabinet. The cabinet contains ten different departments, with 10 directors and 20 specialists.

Current Governor: Soham Gunturu (New Albany High School) 2023–2024

Current Lieutenant Governor: Sugath Suravarapu (New Albany High School) 2023–2024

=== Pacific Northwest State ===
The Pacific Northwest has chapters from Washington, Oregon, Idaho, Montana, and Wyoming. The state has three regions: the Great Pacific Region (western WA), the Inland Empire Region (eastern WA, ID, MT, WY), and the Oregon Region (OR).

Current Governor: Jeff Lin (Liberty High School) 2023-2024

Current Lieutenant Governor: Andrew Lindsay (Newport High School)

Current Lieutenant Governor: Abigail Elperin (Issaquahh High School) 2024-2025

Current GPR Mayor: Mehr Tarafdar (Skyline High School) 2024-2025

Current OR Mayor: Ishana Senthil (Westview High School) 2024-2025

Current IER Mayor: Michael McCauley (Central Valley High School) 2024-2025

=== Southeast State ===
The Southeast state comprises chapters from South Carolina, Georgia, Alabama, Mississippi, and Florida.

Current Governor:

- Sophia Mora (Miami Lakes Educational Center) 2024–2025

Current Lieutenant Governor:

- Carmel Indianer (Naples High School) 2024–2025

=== Southern California State ===
The Southern California state comprises southern California, Arizona (added August 2023), small parts of Nevada and New Mexico.

Current Governor:

- Taylor Beljon-Regen (Palisades Charter High School) 2024–2025

Current Lieutenant Governor:

- Vianny Nuñez (Alliance Collins School) 2024–2025

Current Speaker of the Assembly:

- Allison Cho(John A. Rowland High School) 2024–2025

It was organized into four regions:

==== Angeles Region ====
The Angeles Region consists of greater and Downtown Los Angeles, all the way to West Hollywood. It was the largest region of Southern California.

==== Southern Empire Region ====
The Southern Empire Region consists of Orange County and Anaheim.

==== Channel Islands Region ====
The Channel Islands Region consists of coastal regions and Santa Barbara.

==== Arizona Region ====
The Arizona Region consists of Arizona and parts of New Mexico. It was absorbed into the Southern California State in 2023.

=== Arizona State ===
Past Arizona Governor: Maritza Roberts Padilla (BASIS Tucson North) 2022-2023

Rebecca Sanchez (Cibola High School) 2021-2022

=== Texas State ===
The Texas State compromises of Texas, Arkansas, Oklahoma, and Louisiana. Their Fall and Spring State conventions are held in Houston, Texas, but pre-pandemic, their Fall State conventions were hosted at the Texas Capitol Building in Austin, Texas. Texas State's Winter Congress was hosted in also hosted in Houston, but was previously located in Washington, D.C., with the Mid-Atlantic State. Their state elected officials include the following:

Texas Junior State Governor:

- Kaitlyn Hou (Plano Senior High School) 2022–2023
  - Chief of Staff: Kalina Peneva (Bellaire High School)

Texas Junior State Lieutenant Governor:

- Mitsuki Jiang (Bellaire High School) 2022–2023
  - Chief of Staff: Kyle Letterer (Plano West Senior High School)

Texas Junior State Speaker of the House:

- Ferzine Sanjana (Saint Mary's Hall) 2022–2023
  - Chief of Staff: Brandy Xie (Texas Academy of Mathematics and Science)

The Texas Junior State was organized into two regions and two counties, with mayors serving as leaders of regions and administrators serving as leaders of counties:

==== Gulf Coast Region (GCR) ====
The Gulf Coast Region consists of the Gulf Coast of Texas, with Houston serving as the center of the region. The 2022–2023 Gulf Coast Mayor was Dorothy Okoro.

==== Alamo Capitol Region (ACR) ====
The Alamo Capitol Region consists of the center of Texas, encompassing cities such as Austin and San Antonio. The 2022–2023 Alamo Capitol Mayor was Khushi Patel.

==== Panhandle Metroplex County (PMC) ====
The Panhandle Metroplex County consists of the Northeast quadrant of Texas, encompassing cities such as Dallas, Plano, and Fort Worth. The 2022–2023 Panhandle Metroplex County Administrator was Gabriel Bo.

==== Rio Grande County (RGC) ====
The Rio Grande County consists of the Southern tip of Texas, encompassing cities such as McAllen and Edinburg. The 2021–2022 Rio Grande County Administrator was Lauren Marquez.

== The National Cabinet ==
The National Cabinet was the highest governing body of the Junior State of America, overseeing all administrative departments and chapters. It was responsible for coordinating national initiatives and managing inter-regional affairs.

National Chief of Staff:

- Ishaan Ghosh (South Brunswick High School) 2024–2025

National Director of Debate:

- James Miller (Westlake High School) 2024–2025

National Director of Activism:

- Eva Zhang (Vernon Hills High School) 2024–2025

National Director of Chapter Internal Affairs:

- Jonathan Ling (Maria Carrillo High School) 2024–2025

National Director of Expansion:

- Lila Saenz (Kinder High School) 2024–2025

National Director of Technology:

- Aman Wakankar (West Windsor-Plainsboro High School North) 2024–2025

National Convention Coordinator:

- Sophie Lu (Farragut High School) 2024–2025

National Director of Publicity:

- Mira Shomar (Vista del Lago High School) 2024–2025

== JSA events ==
=== Fall and Spring State conventions ===
Fall State and Spring State are statewide overnight conventions at regional hotels and convention centers. Both consist of debates, thought talks, and special activities, including political fairs and a casual dance. Fall State was one night, students typically arrive at the hotel on a Saturday and return home the following day. Spring State, by comparison, usually takes place over three days, students arriving at the hotel on a Friday and returning on Sunday. At this longer spring convention JSA members in attendance elect regional leaders for the upcoming year. Both Fall and Spring State conventions are highlighted by prestigious keynote speakers, with past speakers including Pat Robertson, Ralph Nader, Colin Powell, Jahana Hayes, Tom Malinowski, Fareed Zakaria and Joe Trippi.

=== Winter Congress convention ===
Winter Congress was structured similar to the United States Congress: students are divided into Senate and House of Representative committees. Student delegates pass bills in committees and then in floor sessions of the Senate and House. If a bill passes both houses, it becomes JSA law.

=== Regional conferences ===
There are also smaller, regional conferences and chapter-conferences ("chapter-cons") which occur on a local level. Regionals are run by the Mayors and Vice-Mayors of Regions along with the Regional Cabinet members that they appoint. Chapter-cons are usually hosted by chapters at individual schools and are not officially JSA-sponsored events.

== Elected positions and cabinet ==
As a student-run organization, each JSA state holds elections yearly at the Spring State conventions to elect student elected officials who serve one-year terms. Each state elects a Governor and Lieutenant Governor, as well as various other offices that differ from state to state. These officials each appoint a small cabinet that helps them run the organization by completing tasks such as organizing convention logistics, writing debates, producing publicity materials, founding new chapters, and running websites. There was also a National Cabinet appointed by the Council of Governors. JSA officials and cabinet members are typically extremely dedicated to JSA, and often spend many hours per week doing their jobs.

== Summer programs ==
After the school year was over, JSA and JSF offer numerous summer programs. The biggest programs, which are held at major universities, are Summer Schools, which are conducted by the Junior Statesmen Foundation and offer students an opportunity to study local, state, or national government at an advanced level. These programs are meant to prepare young leaders for active participation in public affairs.

These programs, at which students take a full semester of two courses over three or four weeks, for which they can receive high school credit, take place at Stanford, Georgetown, Princeton, and Beijing. Along with debate and regular classes (including Advanced Placement and Law Classes), students participate in a Speaker's Program in which notable speakers talk about current issues to the students. Past speakers have included Mike McCurry, Andy Card, Ben Bernanke, Lee H. Hamilton, Norman Mineta, Joe Trippi, Dennis Kucinich, Chuck Hagel, Katie Couric, Brian Williams, Geraldine Ferraro, John Kerry, Harry Reid, Barack Obama, Ted Rall, George H. W. Bush, Condoleezza Rice, Ed Meese, Bernie Sanders, Brian Williams, Karl Rove, Sebastian Gorka, and Sarah Huckabee Sanders.

Summer institutes are also held in different regions, such as the summer symposium of Arizona State, Stanford, UCLA, Princeton University and University of Texas. These events are four- to five-days long and venture into politics, world studies, history, national security and discussions of current events. Princeton's event was nicknamed "Princetitute." These events used to be known as symposia.

Every summer, the newly elected governors each choose a select few from their states or territories to attend the Montezuma National Leadership Summit (affectionately known as "Zuma"). The summit was held in early-to-mid August at Presentation Center in Los Gatos, California, the former site of the Montezuma Mountain School where JSA was founded in 1934. Students who are selected to attend this summit learn more about the history and national dynamics of JSA. Being selected for attendance was considered one of the ultimate JSA honors, and many of the students that attend lead future years of the Junior State. Subsequently, two or three students are selected out of class to become a National Montezuma Foundation Student Advisor, working with the Junior State Foundation to preside over budget and funding allocations for the National Montezuma Summit.
