= Jazza (YouTuber) =

Australian artist (born 1989)

- Born: Josiah Alan Brooks; 20 April 1989 (age 37); Victoria, Australia
- Occupations: YouTuber; artist; animator; television presenter; video game developer
- Spouse: Kate Brooks (m. 2014)
- Children: 2

YouTube information
- Channel: Jazza
- Years active: 2005–present
- Genres: Art education; comedy; vlogging
- Subscribers: 6.73 million
- Views: 1.49 billion
- Last updated: 20 June 2026

Josiah Alan Brooks (born 20 April 1989), known online by the mononym Jazza, is an Australian YouTuber, artist, animator and video game developer best known for producing art tutorials, humorous challenges, and detailed animations. As of June 2026, his primary YouTube channel has reached over 6.7 million subscribers and 1.4 billion video views.

== Career ==
In 2006, when he was 17, he started getting sponsorships from websites for animations, and after graduating high school, he got into producing animation and online video games. He had joined Newgrounds in 2003, and submitted his first game there in 2006. The games were developed using Adobe Flash.

In 2011, he saw that Flash animations were in decline, around the time of the "iPhone era". He looked at his old YouTube channel and noticed that his art tutorial videos had received the most views. In 2012 he created a new channel which he called Draw with Jazza. He said, "People go online looking for tutorials on how to draw. ... Whenever I looked there was nothing good... they had loud music and voice-overs or were slow and boring." He started with tutorials on drawing the human anatomy. The videos were filmed with a simple webcam and microphone and had minimal editing. His tutorials have garnered success in views and have also attracted people to his freelance animation business.

Draw with Jazza videos are uploaded weekly. Often, Josiah's main topics include drawing tutorials, but he also includes character designs, speed painting, and art competitions. He presents "art challenges" of various kinds. He inserts comedic\humorous commentary over his art project videos. He has also reviewed art software and equipment and his secondary channel, Jazza Vlogs (formerly Daily Jazza) includes vlogs where he converses with his community about major events occurring in his life, or behind the scenes looks into his projects. Other channels he has created include It's Tabletop Time, launched in 2015, where he plays role-playing games with his friends; JazzaStudios, where he releases animated shorts; JosiahBrooksMusic, for his original music videos. In 2021 Jazza created a second channel for Tabletop Time, called Tabletop Time Roleplay where Jazza and his other coworkers play tabletop games such as Dungeons & Dragons and Warhammer 40k. Jazza then wanted to expand the art community on YouTube and in 2022 decided to make [Insert Art] and hire a group of artists to give advice on how to keep doing art, how to make your art better, and to do fun community art challenges.

He describes his art style as cartoon-like, but has also tried to extend to comic books. His biggest influence was Christopher Hart, an artist who authors many how-to-draw books. He and Hart would later collaborate to manage Hart's YouTube channel. Other influences include Internet animators Adam Phillips, Bernard Derriman, James Farr, James Lee and Johnny Utah.

In 2014, his YouTube channel reached 100,000 subscribers. It was at this time he was able to switch to treating it as a business and doing it full-time. He received a sponsorship from CEO of Newgrounds Tom Fulp. In 2015, Google and Screen Australia granted Brooks AU$100,000 as part of their Skip Ahead initiative program. He joined other YouTubers in Los Angeles to work at YouTube Space and produced a series of short films titled The Tale Teller, which was a three-part mini-documentary that follows "an old man who enters a city with nothing to his name but the stories he has spent his life gathering, which he wishes to pass on before he dies." In 2015, Forbes contributor Don Groves reported that Draw with Jazza had 25 million views with 60% in the United States and 20% in Europe. In 2016, Forbes contributor Rob Salkowitz reported that Draw with Jazza had 573 videos, over 45 million views and 658,000 subscribers. In November 2017, Mashable reported that Draw with Jazza had two million subscribers, with 45 percent of them from the US, 12 percent from the UK, 10 from Australia, and some amount from non-English speaking countries and locations such as Germany, the Netherlands, and South America.

In 2016, he participated in the Adobe Systems' Twitch stream session on "Building Flexible Animation". He published the book Draw With Jazza – Creating Characters: Fun and Easy Guide to Drawing Cartoons and Comics. He also had a series of shorts called Cartoon It Up which was televised on ABC Me and made available on its video watching app. He designed the April Fools' Day logo "Googz" for Google Australia in 2018.

Brooks regularly attends conventions including PAX, VidCon Australia, and Comic-Con. He says he also outsources some of his work so that other artists can make a living in the same field he does.

In 2019, he changed his YouTube username to Jazza to better fit the more varied content that he wished to publish.

== Personal life ==
Brooks was raised in a Latter-day Saint family, but is now an atheist.

Brooks was born as the fifth of six children. He grew up in Victoria, Australia. At 12 years old he became interested in art/sketches/drawings, and began practicing drawing. He used Jazza as his username and moniker for his Hotmail account. During high school, he began drawing and animating in Microsoft PowerPoint and Adobe Flash. He said he would look forward to spending time in the school library or lunch period where he could draw and create his own realities. He has a brother, Shad M. Brooks, who is also a YouTuber who posts under the name “Shadiversity”. On a community post on his YouTube channel, Jazza claimed to not share his brother's right-wing views.

Brooks met his wife Kate while she was performing as Fantine in a local production of Les Misérables where he was a stagehand. They married in July 2014 and have two children together: a son born in 2015 and a daughter born in 2018. On 31 July 2026, Brooks announced that his wife had been diagnosed with breast cancer and had started chemotherapy.

== Books ==
- Draw With Jazza – Creating Characters: Fun and Easy Guide to Drawing Cartoons and Comics (Impact Books, 2016) ISBN 978-1440344947
- The Ascendants (Threadweavers) (QPI Media Pty. Ltd., 2025) ISBN 9780645635911

== Other works ==
- Jazza's Arty Games – phone and computer application
- Stand out and make money on YouTube! – online course on Skillshare
- How to Talk and Present to Camera like a Pro! – online course on Skillshare
- Jazza's Coloring eBook! – digital coloring book (2017)
- Jazza's Pro-Brush Collection and Illustration guide (2022)
