= List of Google April Fools' Day jokes =

From 2000 to 2019, Google frequently inserted jokes and hoaxes into its products on April Fools' Day, which takes place on April 1. The company ceased performing April Fools jokes in 2020 due to the COVID-19 pandemic and has not performed them since.

== 2000 ==
Google's first April Fools' Day hoax, the MentalPlex trick, was a hoax that invited users to project a mental image of what they wanted to find while staring at an animated GIF. Several humorous error messages were then displayed on the search results page, all listed below:

1. Error 005: KUT Weak or no signal detected. Upgrade transmitter and retry.
2. Error 666: Multiple transmitters detected. Silence voices in your head and try again.
3. Error 05: Brainwaves received in analog. Please re-think in digital.
4. Error 4P: Unclear on whether your search is about money or monkeys. Please try again.
5. Error 445: Searching on this topic is prohibited under international law.
6. Error CKR8: That information is protected under the National Security Act.
7. Error 104: That information was lost with the Martian Lander. Please try again.
8. Error 007: Query is unclear. Try again after removing hat, glasses and shoes.
9. Error 008: Interference detected. Remove aluminum foil and remote control devices.
10. Error: Insufficient conviction. Please clap hands three times, while chanting "I believe" and try again.
11. Error: MentalPlex™ has determined that this is not your final answer. Please try again.

An additional error message was included which converted all navigation text to German, but was scrapped after user complaints.

== 2002 ==
Google reveals the technology behind its PageRank Systems—PigeonRank. Google touts the benefits of this cost-effective and efficient means of ranking pages and reassures readers that there is no animal cruelty involved in the process. The article makes many humorous references and puns based on computer terminology and how Google PageRank really works, (for example, a chart showing the pigeons' consumption of linseed and flax, represented as the "lin/ax kernel," a pun on the Linux kernel).

- Pigeon Rank

== 2004 ==
Fictitious job opportunities for a research center on the moon. Copernicus is the name of a new operating system they claimed to have created for working at the research center.

- Google Job Opportunities: Google Copernicus Center is hiring

Google also announced Gmail on April 1, with an unprecedented and unbelievable free 1 GB space, compared to e.g. Hotmail's 2 MB. The announcement of Gmail was written in an unserious jokey language normally seen in April Fools' jokes, tricking many into thinking that it was an April Fools' joke. In reality, it was a double fake, in that the announced product was serious.

== 2005 ==
Google Gulp, a fictitious drink, was announced by Google in 2005. According to the company, this beverage would optimize one's use of the Google search engine by increasing the drinker's intelligence. It was claimed this boost was achieved through real-time analysis of the user's DNA and carefully tailored adjustments to neurotransmitters in the brain (a patented technology termed Auto-Drink; as the "Google Gulp FAQ" suggests, partly through MAO inhibition). The drink was said to come in "four great flavors": Glutamate Grape (glutamic acid), Sugar-Free Radical (free radicals), Beta Carotty (Beta-Carotene), and Sero-Tonic Water (serotonin). This hoax was probably intended as a parody of Google's then invite-only email service called Gmail. Although ostensibly free, the company claimed the beverage could only be obtained by returning the cap of a Google Gulp bottle to a local grocery store: a Catch-22. In the Google Gulp FAQ, Google replies to the observation, "I mean, isn't this whole invite-only thing kind of bogus?" by saying, "Dude, it's like you've never even heard of viral marketing."

- Google Gulp
- Google Gulp FAQ

== 2006 ==
Google Romance logo

On April Fools' Day 2006, Google Romance was announced on the main Google search page with the introduction, "Dating is a search problem. Solve it with Google Romance." It pretends to offer a "Soulmate Search" to send users on a "Contextual Date". A parody of online dating, it had a link for "those who generally favor the 'throw enough stuff at the wall' approach to online dating" to Post multiple profiles with a bulk upload file, you sleaze in addition to Post your Google Romance profile. Clicking on either of these gave an error page, which explained that it was an April Fool's joke and included links to previous April Fools' jokes.

- Google Romance
- Google Romance FAQ
- Google Romance Tour

== 2007 ==
=== Gmail Paper ===
At about 10:00 pm Pacific time (where Google has its headquarters) on March 30, 2007, Google changed the login page for Gmail to announce a new service called Gmail Paper. The service offered to allow users of Google's free webmail service to add e-mails to a "Paper Archive", which Google would print (on "94% post-consumer organic soybean sputum") and mail via traditional post. The service would be free, supported by bold, red advertisements printed on the back of the printed messages. Image attachments would also be printed on high-quality glossy paper, though MP3 and WAV files would not be printed. The page detailing more information about the service features photographs of Ian Spiro and Carrie Kemper, current employees of Google. Also featured are Product Marketing Managers of Gmail Anna-Christina Douglas and Shane Lawrence.

- Gmail Paper Index
- Gmail Paper Announcement
- Gmail Paper Program Policies

=== Google TiSP ===
Google TiSP (short for Toilet Internet Service Provider) was a fictitious free broadband service supposedly released by Google. This service would make use of a standard toilet and sewage lines to provide free Internet connectivity at a speed of 8 Mbit/s (2 Mbit/s upload) (or up to 32 Mbit/s with a paid plan). The user would drop a weighted end of a long, Google-supplied fiber-optic cable in their toilet and flush it. Around 60 minutes later, the end would be recovered and connected to the Internet by a "Plumbing Hardware Dispatcher (PHD)". The user would then connect their end to a Google-supplied wireless router and run the Google-supplied installation media on a Windows XP or Windows Vista computer ("Mac and Linux support coming soon"). Alternatively, a user could request a professional installation, in which Google would deploy nanobots through the plumbing to complete the process. The free service would be supported by "discreet DNA sequencing" of "personal bodily output" to display online ads that relate to culinary preferences and personal health. Google also referenced the Diet Coke-and-Mentos reaction in their FAQ: "If you're still experiencing problems, drop eight mints into the bowl and add a two-liter bottle of diet soda." They also claim that Enterprise plans will include support in the event of backup problems, brownouts and data wipes.

- Google TiSP
- Google TiSP FAQ
- Installation page
- Press Release page
- Not found page – April Fools' version

== 2008 ==
=== Blogger "Google Weblogs (beta)" ===
The Blogger dashboard featured an announcement for Google Weblogs, or "GWeblogs," or "Gblogs," the next revolution in personal publishing. Features include algorithms putting the user's best content at the top of the user's blog (rather than publishing by reverse chronology), automatically populating the blog's sidebar with the most relevant content, posting directly into Google search results for maximum visibility, blog headers refreshed with images from Google's team of artists for anniversaries of a scientific achievement (similar to Google Doodle), and automatic content generation ('Unsure of what to post about? Just click "I'm Feeling Lucky" and we'll "take care" of the rest!')

The announcement was followed by a link to a video tour of the product, which actually led to Tay Zonday's cover of Rick Astley's "Never Gonna Give You Up."

- Blogger Buzz: The Official Buzz from Blogger at Google: Announcing Google Weblogs (beta)

=== Dajare ===
Google Japan launches Dajare, with the mission of "organizing the world's laughter."

=== Day ===
Google announced Day in Australia, a new beta search technology that will search web pages 24 hours before they are created. The name is a play on the phrase "g'day".

- gDay

=== Gmail Custom Time ===
Gmail's sign-in page and a banner at the top of each Gmail inbox announced a new feature, called Gmail Custom Time, that would allow its users to "pre-date" their messages and choose to have the message appear as "read" or "unread". The new feature uses the slogan "Be on time. Every time."

Around 11:00 pm EST March 31, 2008, on the newer and older version of Gmail, but not in the basic HTML version, in the upper right corner, next to Settings, a link appeared labeled, "New! Gmail Custom Time". The link led to a 404 error until April 1, when it led to the full Gmail Custom Time hoax page. Clicking any of the three links at the bottom of the page brought the user to a page stating that Gmail Custom time was, in fact, their April Fools' Day joke.

=== Google Book Search Scratch and Sniff ===
Google Book Search has a new section allowing users to "scratch and sniff" certain books. Users are asked to "...please place your nose near the monitor and click 'Go'", which then "loads odors". When clicking on "Help", users are redirected to a page in a book that describes the origins of April Fools' Day.

- Inside Google Book Search Blog: "Google Book Search now smells better"

=== Google Calendar is Feeling Lucky ===
Google added the "I'm Feeling Lucky" button to its calendar feature. When a user tries to create a new event, the user was given the regular option of entering the correct details and hitting "Create Event", and also the new option of "I'm Feeling Lucky" which would set the user up with an evening date with, among others, Matt Damon, Eric Cartman, Tom Cruise, Jessica Alba, Pamela Anderson, Paris Hilton, Angelina Jolie, Britney Spears, Anna Kournikova, Johnny Depp, George W. Bush, or Lois Griffin.

=== Google Manpower Search ===
Google launched Manpower Search (谷歌人肉搜索) in China (google.cn). The feature was presented as being powered by 25 million volunteers who conducted searches around the clock. When the user entered a keyword, volunteers would search any possible answers from a mass of paper documents as well as online resources. The user was expected to get the search result within 32 seconds. The "search" button would avoid the user's cursor.

=== Google Saturi Translate ===
Google Korea announced that 'Google Saturi (사투리, Korean dialect) Translate' had been opened on April 1, 2008. When the user tried to use this translator, a message appeared, explaining that it was an April Fools' Day event and was not executable.

=== Google Talk ===
Google announced plans to, on April 22, 2008 (Earth Day), shorten all conversations over Google Talk thereby reducing the energy required to transmit chats in an effort to reduce carbon output.

- Google Talk Goes Green

=== Google Wake Up Kit ===
Google launched their "Wake Up Kit" as a calendar notification option.

The 'wake up' notification uses several progressively more annoying alerts to wake one up. First it will send an SMS message to their phone. If that fails, more coercive means will be used. The kit includes an industrial-sized bucket and is designed to be connected to their water main for automatic filling. In addition, a bed-flipping device is included for forceful removal from their sleeping quarters.

=== Virgle ===
Virgle logo

Google announced a joint project with the Virgin Group to establish a permanent human settlement on Mars. This operation has been named Project Virgle. The announcement includes videos of Richard Branson (founder of Virgin Group) as well as Larry Page and Sergey Brin (the founders of Google) on YouTube, talking about Virgle. An "application" to join the settlement includes questions such as:

I am a world-class expert in:

1. Physics
2. First Aid
3. Engineering
4. Guitar Hero II

After the user submitted the application, the site notifies the user that the user is not fit for space, or that the user's application is fine and "all you have to do is submit your video" [as a response to their video on YouTube]. As a result, an open source Virgle group has been established, OpenVirgle. On the FAQ page, the final question is "Okay, come on – seriously. Is this Virgle thing for real?" The reply links to a page that tells the user it's an April Fools' joke, and then mentions that the user "Dragged us out of our lovely little fantasy world, to crush all our hopes and dreams."

- Virgle Application Page – Virgle: The Adventure of Many Lifetimes

=== Yogurt ===
Yogurt

Google's Orkut displayed its name as yogurt.

=== YouTube ===
On April 1, 2008, all featured videos on all international homepages (starting with the British and Australian homepages) of YouTube were redirected to Rick Astley's "Never Gonna Give You Up", causing all users of the website who clicked on featured videos to be Rickrolled.

This was the first year YouTube participated in Google's April Fools' Day tradition.

== 2009 ==
=== Google runs on Microsoft Windows IIS/3.0 ===
google.com.au reported as if it ran on IIS/3.0 and google.com on Apache/0.8.4 (on Linux).

=== CADIE ===
The announcement of CADIE, meaning "Cognitive Autoheuristic Distributed-Intelligence Entity", was made at 11:59 pm on March 31, 2009 by the CADIE Team, not on April 1. The announcement on the Google blog was made at

2:01 am on April 1, 2009and all of the references to CADIE in Google's Products were taken down on April 2, replaced with a message stating:

We apologize for the recent disruption(s) to our service(s).

Please stand by while order is being restored.

However the technology page describing the technical capabilities of the software remained at: Technical Description.

When using Google Books or Gmail, a user would come across an announcement dated March 31, 2009, at 11:59:59, declaring a new "Cognitive Autoheuristic Distributed-Intelligence Entity". CADIE is also mentioned on the gBall FAQ page: "Google's new CADIE technology will interpret the data obtained from each ball to provide useful tips to owners". There was also a link on Google's Homepage for CADIE, and a blog entry in Google's official blog.

CADIE technology is also used to generate "senryu" (a type of Japanese poem similar to haiku) based on search terms for certain Japanese queries.

The Google Search homepage had a link to the CADIE announcement, stating that "For several years now a small research group has been working on some challenging problems in the areas of neural networking, natural language and autonomous problem-solving. Last fall this group achieved a significant breakthrough: a powerful new technique for solving reinforcement learning problems, resulting in the first functional global-scale neuro-evolutionary learning cluster." The page links to the blog below.

On mobile devices, a link shows up to Brain Search, which uses CADIE technology to "index your brain".

=== Gmail ===
When one is using the Gmail service, they will notice that it has a new option, named "Gmail Autopilot" in which the service would analyze an email. On that page it says under the FAQ section, "You can adjust tone, typo propensity, and preferred punctuation from the Autopilot tab under Settings." However, if a person logs into their Gmail account and goes under the Settings tab they will notice that there is no Autopilot tab. The program could be customized to contain certain types of grammatical or spelling errors, as well as complexity and length of the sentence. It also has a way of responding to relationship related messages, such as if someone spoke aggressively, even in a humorous way, the system would "terminate relationship."

=== gBall ===
Google Australia announced the development of a ball that will change how Australian Football is played the world over. The newest football technology—"gBall" —is a prototype ball for use in the Australian Football League with GPS.

Google Australia announced ("New! Get the newest football technology – gBall.") that they are developing a prototype ball for use in the Australian Football League with GPS. Apparently, the ball will measure the location, force, and torque of a kick, and "vibrate if player agents or talent scouts want to speak to you". Google claimed that the ball will cost $10 with a cost-per-kick set of payments in addition to the basic fee.

=== Google Analytics ===
A blog post to the Google Analytics Blog investigates the analytics reports of CADIE's activities.

=== Google Maps ===
Google's CADIE has a recommended places to visit using Google Maps. Viewing "CADIE's recommended places for humans" one will see each of her suggested places listed, that, when clicked, displays a photo and humorous commentary.

There is also a "CADIE's recommended places for humans" link in Google Maps, which leads to the "Panda Mapplet" and includes several marked locations with "CADIE's" commentary. Under Redmond, Washington a link is listed which will Rickroll the viewer.

=== Blogger ===
CADIE's personal blog/homepage.

=== Google Chrome with 3D ===
Screenshot of Wikipedia.org on April 2, 2009 using Chrome "3-D". Note the red/blue glasses toggle switch at the top of the browser.

A version of Google Chrome was offered rendering web pages in Anaglyph 3D, "powered" by CADIE. A 3D effect was actually possible with this browser, but it only made the window appear to be sunken into the monitor.

- Introducing Google Chrome with 3D

=== Google Earth Powered by CADIE ===
Google announced a new Google Earth powered by CADIE, which claimed to allow the user to see ocean terrain imagery from the world's most advanced submarine, explore the deep sea, soar with CADIE in real time, view CADIE's Recommended Summer Vacation, and chat with CADIE, among other options.

=== Google Code ===
The Google Code Search homepage is featuring LOLCODE examples.

CADIE is set to write code by itself based on specified features; however all that is returned is bad code or witty criticisms of the user's request and choice of programming language, recommending the use of INTERCAL.

CADIE's source code was supposedly uploaded to Google Code, but she changed her mind and replaced it with a "fun program" consisting of 31 lines of INTERCAL. When executed, this program prints out the message "I do not feel like sharing."

=== Google Book Search ===
CADIE recommends some books at Google Book Search homepage. Also, when viewing a book, there is a "Generate book report" button. When clicked, it says "Gotcha! It's April Fools' Day! Sorry, but you'll have to actually read the book yourself."

=== Google Docs on Demand ===
Google has announced new Google Docs features enhanced by CADIE
Add subliminal messages and images to documents.
If a person makes a new presentation and looks for the subliminal message and image buttons under the insert menu they will notice it is not there.

=== Google Mobile ===
Google Mobile has a link to "Brain Search". The instructions are to "Put phone to forehead for brain indexing" and "Think your query". When the user clicks "Try Now", a page loads with "Brain indexing" status. When indexing is complete, a button comes up with "search me". By clicking this button, the user is directed to fake search results. There are several possible results:

- What's the name of that woman by the window? She's my boss's boss, but, oh man, is it Suzanne? Susan? Blanche?
- Should I order the pizza? I don't remember if it makes me gassy.
- Wow, cute guy. Should I go up to him?
- Why is everyone looking at me so strangely?
- When is Mom's birthday? I should send her a card.

=== Google Knol ===
Knol was updated so that all of the featured articles were about Artificial Intelligence, with a message from CADIE indicating that this "improvement" was for the good of mankind.

=== HTTP Headers ===
In keeping with the CADIE theme Google has altered the server HTTP header to contain the name of various AI entities, including HAL 9000, WOPR, and GLaDOS.

Other server HTTP headers found were IIS/Bob (a reference to Microsoft Bob), IIS/Clippy (a reference to Clippy), IIS/3.0, Netscape iPlanet, Chrome/3.0, Google Operating System (BETA), CERN/3.0 (a reference to CERN HTTPd), Apple (a reference to Apple II), IRIX, MCP, Apache/0.8.4, Conficker, and Skynet.

=== Oil Tanker Data Center ===
During the last minutes of Google's Data Center Efficiency Summit, Urs Hoelzle presented in a "special topic": Google had bought an oil tanker, the "M/S Sergey", where Google's data center containers were being submerged in oil tanks to enable extremely high-efficiency cooling. The presentation can be seen in the video on YouTube, and includes slightly customized Wikipedia images from the article Oil tanker, including a retouched photo of commercial oil tanker AbQaiq and the oil tankers side view graphic.

Even though Google did apply for a US patent to build data centers on cargo ships and oil cooling is an existing technology, summit attendee James Hamilton believed this topic to be an April Fools' joke. The ship's name "M/S Sergey" is also likely to be a pun on Google's co-founder Sergey Brin.

=== YouTube upside down ===
On April Fools 2009, watch pages of YouTube appeared upside down.

== 2010 ==
=== Google and Topeka switch places ===
In early March, the city of Topeka, Kansas, temporarily changed its name to Google in an attempt to capture a spot in Google's new broadband/fiber-optics project. Then, on April 1 (April Fools' Day), Google jokingly announced that it would be changing its name to Topeka, to "honor that moving gesture" and changed its home page to say Topeka in place of the Google logo.

=== Google Books available in Anachrome 3D ===
Google Books introduced a feature which allows any book to be read in 3D, assuming the viewer has appropriate glasses. It was enabled by clicking the "View in 3D" button in the menu bar above the book. This feature was removed after April 1, but on June 29, 2010, Google announced its restoration. Google also released the latest form of 3D glasses, similar to the pairs one would use today when seeing a film.

=== Store anything on Google Docs ===
Google announced that Google Docs will have the capacity to upload anything, including physical objects like keys, remote controls, etc. The site declared that one could use this to find items like keys using CTRL-F and send objects around the globe by "uploading" and "downloading" them, at the low price of $0.10 per kg.

=== Search results generated in different units ===
Google's search results page displayed the time taken to load the results in different units from seconds. Several of these are pop culture references, as with 1.21 gigawatts, while others refer to slang:

- at warp X.XX
- 0.XX centibeats
- 0.XX centons
- X.XXe-15
- 0.0X femtogalactic years
- 1.21 gigawatts
- X.XX hertz
- XX.XX jiffies
- 0.XX microfortnights
- 0.XX microweeks
- 0.XX nanocenturies
- 11.90 parsecs
- 0.XXe+43 Planck times
- 23.00 skidoo
- 2.00 shakes of a lamb's tail
- 0.XX times the velocity of an unladen female swallow
- dhaka time

=== YouTube ASCII video filter ===
The logo of YouTube was overlaid with ASCII text repeating the character "1". The YouTube logo was a reference to some videos having a new quality setting, namely "TEXTp". According to a notice underneath the videos, viewing the video with this quality setting enabled allowed YouTube to save one US dollar ($1) per second on bandwidth costs. The notice also remarked on the source of this new "feature," wishing the reader a happy April Fools' Day.

However, in accordance with the announcement, the video quality on many videos was indeed able to be set to 'TEXTp' and video output was rendered through an ASCII filter. This feature was removed on April 2, 2010.

=== Animal Translator BETA ===
Google placed a link on the main page, advertising a new Google Animal Translator service to add to their Language Translator service. Clicking the link would take the user to a page advertising an app for Android phones for the translator, with the tagline being "Bridging the gap between animals and humans".

- Google Translate for Animals

Once the app is installed on an Android phone, it provides some amusing translations depending on the animal selected.

=== Standard Voicemail Mode for Google voice ===
Google placed a New! Standard Voicemail Mode link in the Google Voice main page.

=== Evil Bit ===
Google added an "evil bit" to their AJAX APIs, to aid in generating an appropriate response to nefarious deeds. If an evildoer is "detected", the code returns with, among other things, "For Great Justice", a quotation from the video game Zero Wing. Conversely, setting the evil bit to 'false' will return the Google Search results for 'April Fools' encoded in JSON.

=== Wave Wave Notifications ===
Google Wave can be set to have a human being waved at by the user to notify the user of a change to a Google Wave. The user can also select the volume of the human notifier from a list of silent, medium, loud and vibrate. They can also select which human notifier they want, including Ashton Kutcher, Dr. Wave, Grandma, Werner Heisenberg, and Puppy. Clicking on any of the links on the new notifications page redirected the user to a Google help page, alerting them that it was an April Fools' joke, but also that email notifications are possible.

=== Google Annotations Gallery ===
The Google Annotations Gallery ("GAG") is a new Java open source library that provides a rich set of annotations for developers to express themselves.

=== Disemvoweling on Gmail ===
The English-language home page of Gmail, including its logo, was disemvowelled. A post on the Gmail blog was created to address the issue, claiming that they had encountered a server error which firstly made the data centers fail to render the vowel 'a' before failing to render the vowels, and were working on the problem. They also claimed to be investigating whether the letter 'y' was impacted.

=== Chrome Sounds (Google Chrome Extension) ===
Google created a new extension, Chrome Sounds, after "months deep in psychoacoustic models, the Whittaker-Nyquist-Kotelnikov-Shannon sampling theorem, Franssen effects, Shepard-Risset Tones, and 11.1 surround sound research". The extension provides audio for actions performed within the Google Chrome web browser. For a few interesting sounds, try going to different countries' localized Google pages. The full list of sounds that this extension makes can be found by going to the Chrome Tools menu, choosing Extensions, turning on developer mode, and viewing the source of the extension.

=== Google Analytics Goes Back to Hits ===
Google decided that hits really is the only metric for tracking web site usage.

=== Life sized Picasa ===
Google offered an option which allows the user to print life-size cardboard cutouts of all of their photos.

=== ReaderAdvantage Program ===
Google announced a reward program for Google Reader, known as ReaderAdvantage, in which they would assign points to users depending on the number of items read on Google Reader. The rewards were different badges.

=== Wingdings in AdSense ===
Wingdings was announced as a new font option for AdSense users.

== 2011 ==
=== YouTube ===
A button was added to the video player which, when clicked, would apply a video filter to the video and replace the audio with a recording of Rhapsody Rag, a piece typically played as background music to silent movies in 1911. If subtitles are enabled when watching the video, intertitles will be displayed containing the dialogue. The upload page also featured an option to "send a horse-drawn carriage to me to pick [the video] up". In addition, a few videos were made parodying several viral videos, such as the "Flugelhorn Feline".

=== Gmail Motion ===
A body gesture oriented way to send and view mail through Gmail. In the "How it Works" Section it reads "Gmail Motion uses your computer's built-in webcam and Google's patented spatial tracking technology to detect your movements and translate them into meaningful characters and commands. Movements are designed to be simple and intuitive for people of all skill levels." An overview video presented by Gmail product manager Paul McDonald explains Gmail Motion's "language of movements that replaces type entirely" while a mime artist performs the full-body Gmail actions.

Upon clicking the "Try Gmail Motion" button, it explains to the user about the prank, and says "Gmail Motion doesn't actually exist. At least not yet..." The page also offers a preview of the features of Google Docs Motion.

- Gmail Motion
- Google Docs Motion

=== Google Docs Motion ===
Using Gmail Motion's technology, Google has promoted the BETA version of Google Docs Motion which "will introduce a new way to collaborate – using your body" in their Documents, Spreadsheets, Presentations, Drawings, and Document List tools.

=== Autocompleter Job ===
A YouTube video was posted by Google showing a "Google Autocompleter" employee explaining the job. Also, a job opening was featured for an "Autocompleter." Clicking on the "Add to job cart" or "View cart" links to a Google search for "google April Fools' Day pranks".

- Autocompleter Job

=== Chromercise ===
Google Chrome launched a new website called "Chromercise", which aims to increase people's hands' strength and dexterity while browsing the web faster, and also allowing their hands to fit "into sleeker, sexier gloves". On the website, they also gave away free Google Chrome finger sweatbands for a limited time.

=== Japan ===
Due to the large-scale devastation from the 2011 Tōhoku earthquake and tsunami, in lieu of a traditional April Fools' hoax, Google Japan featured many never-before featured drawings from its 2009 Google Doodle competition, themed "What I Love About Japan" drawn by Japanese schoolchildren, saying "We promised that only the top prize winners would be featured on Google, but as this is the only day where lies are forgiven, we have obtained the other children's understanding." As a small concession to the usual festivities, the Google Blog mentioned, "This year's April Fools' joke has been postponed until next year. Next year's April Fools' joke has been postponed until the year following that."

=== Google 穿越搜索 ===
Google 穿越搜索 is a service that allows user to time travel. The site is written in Simplified Chinese. It claims that it can take the user on a journey through time and space in first-person.

=== Search ===
Searching for "helvetica", "comic sans", or "comic sans ms" temporarily changed the entire webpage's font to Comic Sans.

=== Comic Sans for Everyone ===
Announcement that Comic Sans will become the default font for all Google products. Google also created a Google Chrome extension which changes the font to Comic Sans on all webpages.

=== Google Cow ===
The Google Body homepage appeared as Google Cow, where a cow's body can be examined in 3D. There was a toggle button that switched to human models.

=== Google Maps ===
Google Maps used to display a dragon in Germany's biggest forest, the 'Pfälzer Wald'. Also a shark in the Netherlands' lake called IJsselmeer, East of Amsterdam was featured. When viewed in Earth Mode or Google Earth, these can be rendered in 3D. There is also a narwhal in the Thames in London, outside Millbank Tower. The Loch Ness monster also makes an appearance in 'Loch Ness'. A giant red lobster sits atop the Zakim Bridge in Boston, as well as a pink elephant at "Amphitheatre Parkway, Mountain View, CA".

=== Google Translate for Animals ===
Google UK reportedly offered a version of Google Translate which could be used to talk with animals.

=== Adwords ===
AdWords announced a new format, Google Blimp Ads, that would be flying over major cities starting in May.

=== Google I/O ===
The announced sessions for the Google I/O conference for software developers were changed to include talks featuring technologies from the late 1990s.

=== Contoso has gone Google ===
On the Google Enterprise Blog, Google announced that Contoso (a fictional company used by Microsoft in Microsoft's product documentation materials) has switched from Microsoft Office and Microsoft Exchange to Google Apps. The post included references to 2007's TiSP and 2011's Gmail Motion jokes.

=== Meow Me Now Mobile ===
On the Google Mobile Blog, Google announced a new mobile-based search option for Android and iOS devices which locates kittens near the user's current location.

=== Blogger ===
The blogging service Blogger announced that it was being acquired by Google, even though it has been part of Google since 2003.

== 2012 ==
=== Google Maps 8-bit for NES ===
Google partnered with Square Enix and announced an "NES version" of their Google Maps service, to be released "as soon as possible". The version would be released in NES and Famicom versions (the Famicom version would feature voice input by using the second controller's microphone). In the meantime, Google added a "Quest" layer to the Maps website, which features 8-bit tile-based graphics and sprites on landmarks, both made by Google and by Square Enix (using the Dragon Quest game series' graphics).

=== Improved Japanese Input System ===
Google's proposed improved keyboard based on the experience with Japanese input system from 2010.

=== The YouTube Collection ===
YouTube added a small disc on the right side of the YouTube logo, which when clicked leads to a page about a service called "The YouTube Collection". It claimed to be an at-home experience of YouTube and made everything from videos to comments physical, including a postal mail commenting service. At the bottom of the website, it had a fake shipping form which after filled said "Your order has been placed. Due to heavy demand, your anticipated delivery date is: JUNE 16, 2045" and in small grey text at the bottom said "Also, April Fools'."

=== Google Street Roo ===
Google announced they will deploy a 'roo force' of more than 1,000 big red kangaroos who will capture up to 98% of the Australian bush within the next three years.

=== Underwater Image Search ===
An underwater image search experience developed by Google China.

=== Google Weather Control ===
Google added weather control to its weather search.

=== Chrome Multitask Mode ===
Chrome Multitask Mode makes it possible to browse the web with two or more mice at the same time. Clicking the "Try Multitask Mode" button initially creates one fake mouse that moves around the screen, and over time adds several more and at one point a giant cursor even appears. Clicking the "Exit Multitask Mode" button shows an April Fools' message.

=== Elegantizr ===
Google introduced the Elegantizr framework. To use it, one just needs to insert the following line of HTML:

<link rel="stylesheet" href="https://www.google.com/landing/elegantizr/elegantizr.css" />

Upon insertion, every text begins with APRIL FOOL and an emoticon, before moving on to the regular text.

=== Piano & Guitar Analytics Playback ===
Google Analytics allows the user to play back their website statistics on piano and guitar.

=== Google Racing ===
Google announced a partnership with NASCAR to help create self-driving vehicles to compete in stock car racing. The "I'm Feeling Lucky" button on Google's site was also changed to "I'm Steering Lucky."

=== Gmail Tap ===
Gmail Tap for Android and iOS doubles typing speed with a revolutionary new keyboard. The system involves a keyboard with three keys: Morse code "dash" and "dot", and a spacebar (along with backspace). Shortly before midnight, on March 31, 2012, added Gmail Tap – Android and iOS Application utilizing Morse Code instead of onscreen keyboard. Selecting Download App for Your Phone produces the message: "Oops! Gmail Tap is a bit too popular right now. We suggest you try downloading it again on April 2nd." Clicking the Retry button will produce "It's still April 1st, 2012. You'll have to wait till April 2nd to download Gmail Tap." After clicking the retry button the page will say "Still trying to download Gmail Tap? Check back next April 1st to see if it is available...you never know.". On Gmail's Facebook page, they also posted about a Morse keyboard. Finally, at the Google I/O 2018, Google announced that they will be adding morse code input to its mobile keyboard. The company announced the new feature at Google I/O after showing a video of Tania Finlayson.

=== Really Advanced Search ===
A link on the bottom of search results pages titled Really Advanced Search takes users to a search page where they can filter their search results by, among other things, subtext or innuendo, page font (Comic Sans or Wingdings), loanword origin, or future modification date. Clicking on the "Advanced Search" button to actually run the search query redirects users to search results for "April Fools'".

=== Click-to-Teleport Extensions ===
Click-to-Teleport extensions allow potential customers to instantly teleport to the business location directly from a search ad in a matter of seconds. This teleportation technology shortens the "online-to-store" conversion funnel by providing searchers with an easy way to visit any business and convert. On average, advertisers using Click-to-Teleport extensions have seen their offline sales increase by 3600%.

=== GoRo ===
Solving the increasingly frustrating problem of accessing mobile internet on rotary phones across the US, Google is announcing GoRo. GoRo aims to fix the problem that 100% of people using rotary phones have trouble accessing a website.

=== Jargon-Bot for Google Apps ===
Jargon-Bot instantly recognizes business terms and provides real-time, in-product jargon translation into plain English.

=== Google TV Click ===
Innovative remote control application for phone and tablet lets users interact with shows and movies as they are playing.

=== Google Voice for Pets ===
Google introduced special Voice Communication Collars that fit around animal necks and use a series of sensors to record audio directly from animal vocal cords. Using a WiFi network, audio messages are uploaded to Google Voice within seconds. Alternately, a tiny micro-LED emitter built into the collar can project a keyboard onto the floor, so the animal pet can tap its front paws to send text messages. To understand animal language, Google took their voicemail transcription engine and combined it with millions of adorable pet videos from the Internet, training it to translate cat meows or dog growls into English.

=== $1 Google Offer for Parking Karma ===
Google offers a service for identifying available parking spaces. The service provides the following features:

1. prime spots when you need them,
2. repels parking tickets,
3. includes 1 space buffer on each side,
4. shopping cart protection plan,
5. no parallel parking for first 6 months.

=== Canine Staffing Team ===
Google revealed that dogs at Google offices go through the same detailed recruitment and hiring process by Canine Staffing Team as human Googlers do before being welcomed to the Googleplex.

=== Analytics Interplanetary Reports ===
While currently users can only get a partial picture of website visitor location, Google Analytics is expanding beyond Earth by announcing new Analytis Interplanetary Reports to help users understand visitor activities from neighboring stars and planets. Users will also be able to drill down on each planet to see greater detail, e.g. which colony or outpost visitors came from, similar to the city drill down available for Earth today.

=== "Did you mean: Beyonce" and Kanye West in the Play Music Store ===
Kanye West bugdroid appeared in the Play Music Store. While searching anything, "Did you mean: Beyonce" came up every time.

=== Google Edible fiber ===
Google released a video on YouTube claiming it invented an edible fiber which could "take feedback from the body, determine which nutrients are needed and target delivery to the specific organs that need those nutrients". The video actually links to Google Fiber, a broadband internet service by Google.

== 2013 ==
=== YouTube contest for the best video ===
In YouTube's sixth April Fools' prank, YouTube joined forces with The Onion, a newspaper satire company, by claiming that it will "no longer accept new entries". YouTube began the process of selecting a winner on April 1, 2013, and would delete everything else. YouTube would go back online in 2023 to post the winning video and nothing else. After that, on April 1, 2013, YouTube briefly repeated the "YouTube Collection" joke from April 1, 2012. They also broadcast a live ceremony in which two "submission coordinators" continuously read off the titles and descriptions of random videos (the "nominees") for twelve straight hours, claiming they would do hold the same ceremony every day for the next two years.

=== Treasure Hunt on Google Maps ===
Google Maps allows the user to start a treasure hunt by selecting the "Treasure" view from the top right. Google Maps notes that the "system may not be able to display at higher resolutions than paper print" and that the user should "take care when unfolding the map to avoid ripping it." Also, the user is warned to 'beaware [sic] of pirates'. In reference to the TV show Portlandia, an image of a bird was placed on Portland, Oregon. While in this mode, Pegman is replaced with a telescope, thus giving the effect of looking through an old telescope when using Street View.

- Explore Treasure Mode with Google Maps

=== Improved Google Play Developer Console ===
The addition of an "Add new awesome application" button.

=== Google Japanese Input Patapata Version ===
Google introduces a new Japanese input system. Users repeatedly tap a single button to cycle through different letters. A brief pause confirms the current letter and advances the cursor to begin entering the next one.

The name "Patapata" likely references a Japanese word for Split-flap display, onomatopoeically dubbed "Patapata-shiki" for its distinctive fluttering sound when updating. Another possibile explanation is then the video game Patapon, "Pata" is one of the sounds made with a drum (fitting, as the announcement video also mentions the, “Google Japanese Input Drum Set Version,”, joke from 2010.).

=== Gmail Blue ===
Gmail is now the color blue. Coincidentally, Google would eventually go on to release Inbox by Gmail which features a similar interface to Gmail, only blue.

=== Google SCHMICK (Simple Complete House Makeover Internet Conversion Kit) ===
Google SCHMICK allows the user to redesign his or her street viewed house so that the user can "fly the Australian flag" outside the user's house.

=== Google Fiber Poles ===
Google Fiber to the Pole provides gigabit connectivity to fiberhoods across Kansas City. This latest addition to Google Fiber technology enables users to access Google Fiber's gigabit speeds, even when they are not in a fixed location.

=== Google Wallet Mobile ATM ===
Google announced the release of the Google Wallet Mobile ATM. The mobile ATM device attaches to most smartphones and dispenses money in an usual speed – ending the user's search for the nearest bank or ATM. The Google Wallet Mobile ATM technology allows the user to enter the amount of money they want to withdraw directly to a phone or use voice-activated dispenser. Unlike traditional ATM's, the Google Wallet Mobile ATM dispenses rare two and fifty dollar bills, as well as more practical one dollar bills.

=== Levity Algorithm in Google Apps ===
Google introduces the Levity Algorithm in Google Apps to help users spice up even the most boring of work days.

=== Updated Export and Send-To features on Google Analytics ===
Google updated the Export and Send-To features for Google Analytics to give users more options and support for some legacy technologies: 3.5" floppy, CD-ROM, papyrus, sticky note, carrier pigeon, fax, telegram, and telegraph.

=== Self-Writing Code Program ===
Google developed a program capable of generating code automatically. As a result, engineers may spend less time writing code directly and more time on other activities such as collaboration with colleagues, attending talks or events on campus, or participating in workplace amenities. The company has stated that it encourages employees to maintain a balance between their professional responsibilities and personal life.

=== Google Search Cold Trends ===
The concept of "cold searches" refers to topics with low search volume on Google. These searches relate to subjects that receive limited attention.

=== Google Nose ===
Google announces a new "Google Nose" feature, which adds scents to items in the Google Knowledge Graph. Users can click a "Smell" button on select items to experience scents directly through their existing desktop computer, laptop, or mobile device. The launch was announced on YouTube with title Introducing Google Nose of Google's official YouTube channel.

== 2014 ==
=== Software Dogengineer ===
Google created an entry in their careers page looking for a dogengineer.

=== Google Maps Pokémon Challenge ===
Google joined forces with The Pokémon Company, Game Freak, and Nintendo to develop a new Google Maps app for the iOS and Android, which allowed users to capture Pokémon while exploring the real world using Google Maps. The concept of the app would later be refined and released as Pokémon Go in 2016.

=== Gmail Selfie ===
Based on the popularity of adding pictures of oneself as a Gmail custom theme, Google launches a feature to share that custom theme (of one's self) with their friends.

=== Nest + Virgin ===
After acquiring Nest Labs in early 2014, Google teamed up with Virgin Airlines about the latest in-flight feature. Passengers on the Virgin Airlines aircraft have the ability to change their personal temperature on the plane using their latest Total Temperature Control.

=== Google Japanese Input: Magic Hand Version ===
There are many problems with inputting Japanese on a mobile device using one's finger – so Google has introduced the *Magic Hand* to solve them.

=== Emojify the Web ===
Google Translate support for Emoji is built directly into Chrome for Android and iOS. One can now read all their favorite Web content "using efficient and emotive illustrations, instead of cumbersome text." Google's translation algorithm interprets not just the definition of the words on a webpage, but also their context, tone, and sometimes even facial expression in order to convert them into symbols. "Not only does this pictorial and theatrical language allow us to communicate complex emotions, it's also far more compact. One Emoji symbol can easily replace dozens of characters, improving efficiency and comprehension on the go. It turns out the best way to communicate in the future is to look to the past: the ancient Egyptians were really onto something with their hieroglyphs."

=== Auto-Awesome Photobombs with David Hasselhoff ===
Google announced on the Official Google Blog that they would randomly insert David Hasselhoff into Google+ photos via the Auto-Awesome feature.

=== WazeDates ===
'WazeDates' uses the same crowdsourcing technology designed to help drivers around the world outsmart traffic, while creating a new space for people to meet and fall in love.

=== Upcoming Viral Video Trends ===
In March 2014, YouTube announced that they write, shoot, and upload all of the world's most popular viral videos. In 2014, they are also accepting viral video ideas from YouTube users.

=== AutoAwesome for Resumes ===
Google announced that it's rolling out special effects for Resumes on Google Drive.

=== Qwerty Cats Chrome Extension ===
The Chromium team releases a QWERTY virtual keyboard for cats on the Chrome Web Store.

=== Coffee to the Home ===
Google Fiber launches Coffee to the Home (CTTH) program for Kansas City residents; delivering made-to-order coffee drinks straight to users at fiber speeds—through the same fiber jack that delivers 100 times faster Internet.

=== AdBirds ===
Google AdWords team now released AdBirds, a new way to show ads. The user has six birds (Sparrow, Duck, Owl, Pigeon, Eagle and Penguin) to choose from, and they add in a little bit of text before setting the bird free into the world, for everyone to see their ad.

=== Google Apps for Business Dogs ===
Google announced that they're launching a suite of features to make Google Apps more useful for Dogs in the workplace. Features include Dmail with translation, Hangouts with Bark Enhancement, and paw recognition technology.

=== Google Analytics Academy: Data-less Decision Making ===
Google announced a web course on how to "make uninformed business decisions on a whim by following gut instincts and applying simple guesswork techniques."

=== Helpouts by Google: Helpouts from a Pirate ===
Scowlin' Guideon Scabb the Beardless helps one hone their pirate vocabulary 1 on 1 over live video.

=== AdSenses on planets and moon ===
Now interplanetary IP addresses are interpreted. "With our recent discovery of the interplanetary IP address repository, you'll have access to even more reports that can help you improve user engagement on your site. For example, if you notice a lot of traffic coming from Mars, try adding more pages in Martian to engage with those audiences."

=== Google Play Signature Edition ===
Signature Apps lets developers ship their work directly to customers on a thumbdrive inside a special package ready for unboxing, preferably "using natural sources of locomotion such as biking and walking" to reduce the environmental impact. The dev console includes settings for shipping apps, an explanation of the value add, and a reminder to sign apps on a piece of paper or electronically to give them more authenticity. Unfortunately, hitting the Save button doesn't work.

=== Chromecast for squirrels ===
Google says it is working with "developers of 'paw-friendly' apps to build Chromecast support into more of the apps and websites both humans and squirrels love."

== 2015 ==
=== Pac-Maps ===
Google added a "Pac-Man View" to Google Maps, allowing users to play Pac-Man along real world streets. The bell and key were replaced by the map marker and the Street View "pegman" respectively. Created by John Tantalo, a software engineer at Google, and his wife Mary Radcliffe, an assistant professor of mathematics at the University of Washington, Pac-Maps remained available for about ten days.

=== Ingress Pacman ===
Niantic Labs, a startup internal to Google, added Pacman to the Ingress scanner.

=== #ChromeSelfie ===
Google added a "Share a reaction" button to the Chrome mobile app menu, which lets the user take a half-selfie, half-screenshot picture of the current-viewing site and then share it, offering to use the Hashtag #ChromeSelfie.

=== Smartbox by Inbox by Gmail by Google ===
Google announced a Smart Mailbox for a user's physical mail, with auto-sorting folders, push notifications, temperature control, spam protection and more.

=== com.google ===
Google launched com.google, a version of Google Search in which the site is reflected horizontally. This was the company's first usage of the .google top-level domain. The site is no longer active.

=== Google Fiber Dial Up Mode ===
Google Fiber launched dial up mode which slows a user's life down, "to pause and take care of the little things".

=== Darude – Sandstorm ===
On many song-related searches on YouTube and Twitter, it suggests Sandstorm by Darude. It also adds its button to any video that plays its sequence. This joke was a reference to the Internet phenomenon associated with the song.

=== Google Panda ===
Product manager for Google Search launched Google Panda, a panda plush toy aimed to 'change the face' of Google Search. State of the art emotional and conversational intelligence allows the panda to respond to their human and answer any question just as a user would on Google Search or Google Now using the voice search feature.

=== Equator Slipping: Australia to become Northern Hemisphere ===
Google Maps engineers from the Google Sydney office 'discovered' that the Earth's equator was slipping south at a rate of 25 km per year. This was backed by evidence from Veritasium's Derek Muller, measuring the movements of the Milankovitch cycles, which predicted "the northernmost point of Australia, Cape York could enter the Northern Hemisphere as soon as 2055."

=== Google Actual Cloud Platform ===
The Google Actual Cloud Platform is the world's first public cloud running on servers in the troposphere.

=== Google Keyboardless Keyboard ===
Google Japan announced a keyboard shaped like a party horn that a user blows in order to type.

=== Quantum Code Testing ===
The Google testing blog announced that it has radically simplified software testing by being able to model every possible state of a software application by employing quantum superposition techniques.

== 2016 ==
=== Gmail Mic Drop ===
A new feature was added to Gmail called "Mic Drop", which archived the email message as soon as it was sent and inserted a GIF of a Minion from the Despicable Me film series. However, the feature immediately caused backlash. Many people complained about accidentally sending the GIF to people at businesses, which resulted in some people being dropped from job consideration or even being fired. Google removed the feature not long after, citing those reasons and a bug that caused the GIF to be sent after hitting the regular send button.

=== Google Cloud Style Detection API ===
Google Cloud announced a new Machine Learning API called Style Detection, which allowed automatic identification and categorization of the fashion metadata in a given image. The YouTube video featured several members of the Google Cloud team and was shot in the Spear St. San Francisco office. Obviously, there are still details to iron out.

=== Searchable Socks ===
Google Australia announced a new product called Searchable Socks, a pair of socks which if lost could be found using the Google app. When the user taps the beacon on the Google app, the sock would then play the Trololo song.

=== Google Maps Disco ===
Google Maps features a video with the Pegman from Street View disco dancing.

=== Parachutes by Google Express ===
As stated in the description of the YouTube video Google uploaded promoting this service: "Google Express offers fast delivery of things you need from stores you love. With our new delivery technology, packages will arrive even faster and land anywhere you want them – whether at the beach, in the woods, or even on a run."

=== Google Cardboard Plastic ===
Google announced a transparent plastic version of the Google Cardboard viewer without a smartphone slot, making a user see real life through it instead.

=== YouTube SnoopaVision ===
YouTube launched the SnoopaVision feature, which allows users to watch videos in 360 degrees. The feature gets its name from Snoop Dogg, who was hired by Google to sponsor the project by appearing on announcements, but ended up being a "true leader" of it.

=== Google Self-Driving Bike ===
Google Netherlands announced Google Self-Driving bike inspired by their self-driving cars. Deputy mayor Kajsa Ollongren of Amsterdam also made an appearance in the video.

=== Physical Flick Japanese Input ===
Google Japan announced that it had been working hard to bring the flick actions of its virtual Japanese input to the real world.

=== Inbox by Gmail Emoji Smart Reply ===
The Gmail team announced it had added "sass" to Inbox by Gmail's smart reply feature, now including emoji in its one-click responses.

=== Interplanetary app publishing ===
In the app publishing process the "Pricing & Distribution" section contained a blue box entitled "DISTRIBUTE TO THESE PLANETS" containing a list of planets from Mercury through to Pluto. Pluto had been crossed out and a note appended which read "No longer supported." A "Learn more" caption was provided which linked to a blog post by Lily Sheringham.

=== Google X New Chief Compression Officer ===
Google X announced that they hired Richard Hendricks (from HBO's TV show, Silicon Valley) as their Chief Compression Officer, in order to solve compression challenges they were facing.

=== Google Play RealBooks ===
Google announced RealBooks, a new form of ebook for those who miss having physical copies of books. These books were essentially a smartphone with every feature removed except the ability to read a single ebook. The video was removed at a later date for unknown reasons.

== 2017 ==
=== Ms. Pac-Maps ===
Google has partly revived new Pac-Maps to allow users to play the popular video game Ms. Pac-Man along the streets of the world. Although, this time, instead of turning the player's current location into the game level, the player is taken to a random spot in the world. The mobile app for Maps also displays a button to play Ms. Pac-Maps.

=== Google Wind ===
Google Netherlands says that "Holland^{[sic]} is one of the greatest countries to live in, but the biggest downside is that it rains 145 days a year". They also stated that "it uses Machine Learning to recognize cloud patterns and orchestrate the network of windmills when rain is approaching. Test results look very promising." On April 1, they would be able to ensure clear skies for everyone in the Netherlands. This is an example of an attempt to control the weather locally.

=== Google Japanese Input Puchi Puchi Version ===
A version of Google Japanese Input using bubble wrap. Also, on the website they gave at the end of the video, there was a bubble wrap at the end of the page.

=== Haptic Helpers ===
Google claims that "it takes the virtual reality world to the next level" by implementing the missing three senses of older VR technology: taste, touch, and smell. When one tries to sign up however, the sign-up button become the words,"APRIL FOOLS!"

=== Google Cloud Platform Expands to Mars ===
Google announced the creation of a datacenter on Mars, nicknamed "Ziggy Stardust," which would open in 2018 starting with a new Mars location in Google Cloud Storage. Part of Google's announcement included the ability to walk-through their new datacenter in Google Street View.

=== Mobile Accessories for Chromebook ===
Google announced a wide range of accessories for the Chromebook that are only available for mobile phones, such as the "Chromebook Groupie Stick," "Chromebook Cardboard," and "Chromebook Workout Armband."

=== Google Translate for Heptapod B ===
Google announced Heptapod B (the fictional language of "Story of Your Life" and the motion picture based on it) as the 32nd language to be supported in Word Lens.

=== Google Gnome ===
Google announced a new Google Assistant product designed for the yard called "Google Gnome". It has some of Google Home's features, except that it is intended to be used outdoors. According to Google, it can report about the environment and the outdoors. It only responds to voice and is hand-free. It can also mow the lawn, acting as a lawnmower. The announcement video was edited in countless memes, in a similar fashion to the announcement video of Amazon Echo.

=== Google Now for Dogs & Cats ===
Google announced a new force 3D touch action on the Google app for iOS that would open a special experience for cats or dogs.

=== Google Play for Pets ===
Google announced a new Google Play category for Pets with games, apps and training tools to keep a pet stimulated.

== 2018 ==
=== Google Cloud Hummus API ===
Google Israel launched a "hummus API" to organize information, even hummus. It attempts to store their favorite type of hummus as information.

=== Gboard Physical Handwriting Board ===
Google Japan, from the Google Japanese Input team, proposed a physical handwritten version of Gboard. The device was developed "to realize intuitive character input". It was also said in the video to stretch the feature to beyond keyboards, such as an abacus and even corn.

=== Where's Waldo on Google Maps ===
Five classic Where's Waldo scenes were hidden over Google Maps. Finding Waldo in each scene rewarded the player with a hint as to finding the next one. Completing all the levels unlocked a secret sixth scene on the Moon, which could be accessed by zooming out in Satellite view.

=== Bad Joke Detector ===
Google announced that its file management app Files Go would use a "custom-built deep neural network" to free up storage by deleting bad jokes from the user's device.

=== Googz ===
Google Australia made a redesign of Google for Australian citizens called "Googz". Google asked Aussie designer Jazza to make a convincing video about the new adaption of the word Googz. They conducted "surveys" which showed some false results on how "80%" of Australians commonly refer to Google as Googz.

=== Recrawl Now ===
Google Search Console made a site recrawl feature that instead rickrolls the user.

== 2019 ==
=== Sssnakes on a map ===
Google Maps had a feature to play Snake in several cities. During the week of April Fools' Day, this was accessible in the app. Many cities were available, such as Cairo, London, San Francisco, São Paulo, Sydney, and Tokyo, and even the world. There was also a standalone site at snake.googlemaps.com.

=== Google Tulip ===
Google Tulip logo

Google Nederland released a video on YouTube about a new app allowing communication with tulips, by translating the root signals of tulips into spoken words.

=== Google Calendar ===
Google Calendar invites a user to clear their schedule, one meeting at a time, with laser-sharp precision. Click the Gear icon, then select Play a game (alternatively, deep link is: https://calendar.google.com/?playagame)

=== Gboard Spoon Bending ===
Google Japan followed up 2018's physical handwriting board with 2019's Spoon Bending version, a special, smart spoon that allows users to type Japanese characters in Gboard by bending it. This invention allows the user to type almost effortlessly anytime, anywhere, allowing the user greater flexibility in their writing. Allegedly they are also developing other bending technologies, such as an "outdoor version" consisting of a fishing rod and a "hands off" version where the spoon will be bent telepathically.

=== Google Assistant ===
If the user writes "April Fools" to Google Assistant, it will now offer a random April Fools' prank in history.

=== Google Colab ===
"Power Mode - rack up combos and see sparks fly". It introduced a new mode that, when activated, causes sparks to fly out from the cursor when typing, and shows an animated "combo counter".

=== Gmail ===
To commemorate the 15th anniversary of the email client’s release, the Gmail logo featured balloons and a party hat on April 1.

=== YouTube ===
After a two year hiatus YouTube returned to making April Fools' pranks. This year they had an ad on the top of the home page for an Aquaman 2 movie, but instead of the playable video being a trailer for it the video was for the Shazam! trailer instead.

=== Files App: Screen Cleaner ===
Google released a video about Screen Cleaner with an "Activate" button that when pressed, dirt and stains magically poof away. Then the phone vibrates, creating a non-stick shield "With a fresh pineapple scent."

== Cancellation ==
Google canceled its 2020 April Fools' jokes for the first time due to the COVID-19 pandemic, urging employees to contribute to relief efforts instead.

Since the cancellation in 2020, Google has not participated in April Fools. However, in 2020, April 1 was celebrated with the anniversary of Jean Macnamara's birthday.

== Post-cancellation ==
On October 1, 2021, Google Japan resumed its annual tradition of creating novelty keyboards, and has subsequently released new novelty keyboards annually on October 1. Given the release occurring exactly half a year after April 1, it has been described as an April Fools' Day in October. As with all novelty keyboards produced by the team since 2012, the schematics of these devices are available as open source, hence, the name of the keyboard series itself (“The Gboard DIY [Keyboard] Series.”.).

- 2021: Gboard Yunomi, a keyboard with the form factor of a traditional Japanese teacup, with keycaps representing traditional fish used in the preparation of sushi.
- 2022: Gboard Bar Version, a single-row keyboard spanning 5.25 feet.
- 2023: Gboard CAPS, a large key-shaped hat which one can select a letter by rotating and transmit a keypress by pressing down on the hat.
- 2024: Gboard Double-Sided Version, this is a double-sided keyboard that is shaped like a Möbius Strip.
- 2025: Gboard Dial Version, a keyboard based on rotary dial phones.
- 2026: Gboard Conveyor Belt Version, a vertical keyboard where keys continuously move like a conveyor belt.

== Real April Fools' Day product launches ==
Google has chosen April Fools' Day and the day before it to announce some of their actual products, as a form of viral marketing.

- Shortly before midnight on March 31, 2004, Google announced the launch of Gmail. However, it was widely believed to be a hoax, since free web-based e-mail with one gigabyte of storage was unheard of at the time.
- In 2005, Google increased Gmail storage to two gigabytes and released Google Ride Finder.
- On March 31, 2010, YouTube implemented its new video page design, which had been revealed two months earlier.
- On April 1, 2010, Google Street View received a new feature to toggle anaglyph 3D images. It was available by clicking on the icon depicting "pegman" wearing a pair of red/cyan glasses. The icon was present until April 8, when it was removed.
- Google Japan has open sourced the "firmware, circuit diagrams, and design drawings" for all of its novelty input devices, beginning with Google Japanese Input Morse version on April 1, 2012, to allow anyone to build their own versions of the devices.
- On April 1, 2013, Google announced Google+ Emotion. Google+ can now 'plumb the emotional depths of everyone in the photo, then summarize their feelings with a beautifully crafted, emotion icon'
- On April 1, 2014, Google announced Shelfies (Shareable Selfies), which allows one to add pictures of oneself as a Gmail custom theme and share that custom theme (of one's self) with their friends. The first version of Brotli compression format specification was published.
- On April 1, 2016, Google introduced a new feature for Google Photos, allowing users to search their photos using emojis.
- On April 1, 2026, Google upgraded the storage available for Google AI Pro users from 2 TB to 5 TB.

== See also ==
- Netflix April Fools' Day jokes
