= Harry Whitlohn =

Spoof character on BBC Radio programme Desert Island Discs

Sir Harry Whitlohn was a spoof character who appeared as a "castaway" on the BBC Radio programme Desert Island Discs and was interviewed as though he were real, by the presenter Roy Plomley, on 1 April 1963 - April Fools' Day.

Whitlohn was variously presented as a "man of affairs, musician, mountaineer, and mystic", an "88-year-old mountaineer, mystic and spy" and "the only man living who had collaborated with Brahms".

In reviewing the book "Desert Island Discs: 70 Years of Castaways" by Sean Magee for The Guardian in 2012, Stephen Moss wrote:

Plomley's strong suit was his sense of the absurd, and his encounter with theatrical manager Sir Harry Whitlohn is especially memorable.

The role of Whitlohn was played by the actor Henry Sherek, himself a former castaway on the programme. The character was originally to be called "Harry Whitlow".
