= List of Reddit April Fools' Day events =

Over the years, social media site Reddit has done multiple pranks and events for April Fools' Day.

== Reddigg (2009) ==
For April Fools' Day 2009, Reddit changed its layout to resemble that of its rival, Digg. It also rebranded itself "Reddigg".

== Admin for a day (2010) ==
For April Fools' Day 2010, Reddit's first massive April Fool's social experiment was to make everyone on site an admin. For 24 hours, users could ban one another, modify upvotes, and delete comments.

== Reddit Mold (2011) ==
For April Fools' Day 2011, Reddit replaced its Reddit Gold subscription with Reddit Mold, a joke version of the premium service that could be given to users to make the website experience worse. For example, users who were given Mold would only be able to see fewer posts per page as well as not being able to post anything containing the letter E. These effects were amplified upon receiving more Mold, such as losing the ability to post another letter for each Mold received.

== Timereddits (2012) ==
On April Fools' Day 2012, a timeline bar was added to the front page that allowed users to view what the front page would look like in the past or future. Multiple "timereddits" were also created, specific subreddits for different time periods.

== Buying Team Fortress 2 (2013) ==
Reddit teamed up with Valve, saying Reddit bought Team Fortress 2 by tricking the team's developers with switched documents. Users who logged in during the time were assigned a team: Orangered or Periwinkle. Weapons were added to profiles and could be used on themselves or other users.

Users who connected their Reddit account to their Steam account received a Team Fortress 2 hat depending on what team they were on.

== Headdit (2014) ==
For April Fools' Day 2014, Reddit did "headdit", a joke way to navigate and use the website using the webcam.

== The Button (2015) ==
For April Fools' Day 2015, a social experiment subreddit called r/thebutton appeared. It displayed a button and a 60-second countdown timer. User accounts created before that day were eligible to participate. A user could only click the button once, or opt not to click it. If a user clicked the button the timer was globally reset to 60 seconds, and the user's "flair" (an icon next to the user's name) changed color. Colors were assigned based on a gradient from purple to red with purple signifying up to 60 seconds and red as low as 0 seconds. The countdown reached zero several times due to technical problems but eventually expired without further problems on June 5, 2015, after which the subreddit was archived.

== Robin (2016) ==
For April Fools' Day 2016, another experiment was launched involving the "Robin" chat widget. After clicking a titular button, an IRC-like chat window was opened with one other user, and allowed a certain time to pick among three options: "Grow", "Stay" and "Leave". "Grow" would join the chat with another group, "Stay" would close the group chat and create a subreddit with that group as moderators and "Leave" would close the group chat.

== Place (2017) ==
For April Fools' Day 2017, featured a social experiment based on r/place. The subreddit contained a collaborative pixel art canvas, where a user could place a pixel every five minutes (the timer was temporarily ten and twenty minutes for a few hours on April 1). Many people worked together to create large graphics, such as flags or symbols. Often subreddits would come together as a group to add a graphic from that community to place. Place was closed on April 3, 2017, at 1:00 PM GMT having been active for a full three days.

== Sequence (2019) ==
For April Fools' Day 2019, a social experiment subreddit called r/sequence was released. The experiment consisted of a community-driven sequencer that users interacted with by submitting GIFs or text slides to be compiled into a movie. The order of the GIFs and text slides were chosen by users through upvoting one GIF or text slide per scene. The most upvoted GIF or text slide was locked into the next available scene for every three minutes. At the end, once the entire sequence was filled, it was posted as a full story in an external page. The experiment ended at April 3, 2019, 11:08 PM GMT.

== Second (2021) ==
For April Fools' Day 2021, Reddit released r/second, in which users have to guess the second most popular option out of a group of three options. The event ended after 2000 one-minute rounds, with the final round lasting one hour.

== Place II (2022) ==
For April Fools' Day 2022, Reddit once again featured r/place, similar to the event featured in 2017. The subreddit featured a 1000 x 1000 pixel collaborative canvas which users could edit the color of a single pixel every five minutes. However moderators could edit any color at anytime. The event began on April 1, 2022, at 1:00 PM GMT, and would be live for 87 hours. On the second day of r/place, the canvas was expanded from 1000 x 1000 to 2000 x 1000, allowing for more artwork. On the third day of r/place, the canvas was once again expanded from 2000 x 1000 to 2000 x 2000. Before the event ended, users were only allowed to place white pixels, reverting the canvas back to its original state.

== Field (2025) ==
For April Fools' Day 2025, reddit created r/field where 4 teams (Sunshine, Flamingo, Lasagna and Juicebox) competed on a grid to claim the most squares for their teams. Players could get "banned" playing which redirected them to other subsequent levels. The event ended with Sunshine team as the winner.
