= Taco Liberty Bell =

April Fool's joke by Taco Bell

The advertisement as it appeared in the April 1, 1996 edition of The New York Times.

The Taco Liberty Bell was an April Fool's Day joke played by fast food restaurant chain Taco Bell on April 1, 1996. Taco Bell took out a full-page advertisement in six leading U.S. newspapers (The Philadelphia Inquirer, The New York Times, The Washington Post, The Chicago Tribune, The Dallas Morning News, and USA Today) announcing that the company had purchased the Liberty Bell to "reduce the country's debt" and renamed it the "Taco Liberty Bell". The ad was created by Jon Parkinson and Harvey Hoffenberg who worked at Bozell, the Taco Bell advertising agency at the time, and went on to win several industry awards. Thousands of people had called Taco Bell headquarters and the National Park Service before it was revealed at noon the same day that the story was a joke. White House Press Secretary Mike McCurry responded that the federal government was also "selling the Lincoln Memorial to Ford Motor Co. and renaming it the Lincoln-Mercury Memorial".

== Influence ==
The prank was considered a successful advertising gambit by those involved. David Paine, founder of PainePR, the public relations agency that executed the campaign, called it "the most successful project I've been involved with". The campaign cost US$300,000 (equivalent to about $616,000 in 2025), but generated an estimated US$25,000,000 (equivalent to about $51,300,000 in 2025) worth of free publicity, with a sales increase exceeding US$1,000,000 (equivalent to about $2,100,000 in 2025) for the first two days in April. Paine, however, feels that the sociopolitical climate in 2006 was much more cautious and a comparable prank would not be possible. The origin is credited to the mother of then-CEO John Martin.

The stunt has also been listed as one of the top hoaxes or marketing stunts over the years. Entrepreneur Magazine includes it among its "Top 10 Successful Marketing Stunts". The Museum of Hoaxes ranks it as No. 7 on its list of the "Top 100 April Fool's Day Hoaxes of All Time".

According to marketing author Thomas L. Harris, the stunt worked because "in today's world...almost everything is corporate-sponsored", making the announcement believable even for "a national historic monument". The company coined the term "publitisement" to describe its stunt, "breaking through advertising clutter to achieve massive awareness" for its then-new "Nothing Ordinary About It" ad campaign. From the other side, activist Paul Rogat Loeb lamented that the hoax "felt too real for comfort" in an era "when every value, ideal, and public symbol has a profit-seeking sponsor".
