= Netflix April Fools' Day jokes =

Tricks played by Netflix on April 1

The video on demand Internet streaming media provider, Netflix, performs April Fools' Day practical jokes on its subscribers. These jokes have included overly detailed categories for films, comic public service announcements and two original films composed entirely of footage of food cooking.

== Jokes ==
=== 2013 ===
Netflix added overly detailed genres to its service, including "Movies Starring Estelle Getty and Some Other Guy" (with only the film Stop! Or My Mom Will Shoot listed), "Reality TV About People With No Concept Of Reality," "Surreal Ballets Based On A William Shatner Album" (with only the film William Shatner's Gonzo Ballet), "When You Watch Netflix, It Watches You" (featuring videos with eyes on the cover), "Movies And TV Shows About Seriously Pissed Off Wives," "Movies Featuring An Epic Nicolas Cage Meltdown," "Nephrotic Adventures Featuring Very Tiny Children" (with only the film Chasing the Kidney Stone listed), "Movies That Are in English, But Still Require Subtitles" (with Snatch and Trainspotting), and "TV Shows Where Defiantly Crossed Arms Mean Business!" (featuring television shows with cover art showing people with their arms crossed).

=== 2014 ===
Netflix added two "Netflix originals" including Sizzling Bacon, a 20-minute feature of bacon cooking, and Rotisserie Chicken, a 73-minute feature of a chicken cooking on a rotisserie.

=== 2015 ===
Netflix created a series of public service announcements, warning users of the "dangers of binge-watching." Thirteen messages were created, starring actors and actresses from Netflix original programming shows, such as Michael Kelly from House of Cards (telling the viewer to go to work) and Selenis Leyva from Orange Is the New Black providing a bilingual message (Spanish and English) encouraging the viewer to do their homework. The PSAs would play when the viewer watched two episodes of the same show in a row.

=== 2016 ===
Netflix again added overly detailed genres to its service, but all having something to do with John Stamos of Full House such as "Horror Movies that give John Stamos the Heebie-Jeebies" and "Movies that make John Stamos feel emotions." The next day, the site issued a humorous apology to Stamos in an exclusive video.

=== 2017 ===
On March 31, Netflix added a new featured Netflix Original titled Netflix Live. The show features 48 minutes of comedy actor Will Arnett providing commentary on "live crosses" to tediously mundane footage, mostly featuring office settings and appliances. The featured settings were a photocopier, a microwave, a toaster, two people thumb wrestling (who turned out to be Adam Sandler and Shannon Purser), a crossword puzzle, a refrigerator (from the inside with the door closed), a pencil sharpener, an office cubicle, a book of Shakespeare (being read), a driver parallel parking (poorly), nighttime, a puddle, and grass. During each scene, Arnett appears in a box in the bottom-left of the screen giving running commentary. Some of his witticisms were:

- (About the copy room) "Everything in here is so organized. Must be a German in this office, huh?"
- (As the microwave counted down) "If you listen to Jared Leto, apparently you can get to Mars in 30 seconds. I tell you what will take you one second is getting out of the room if someone puts on a Jared Leto record."
- (About the book) "The only thing worse than 'The Works of Shakespeare' is its index."
- (About the puddle) "That puddle makes me happy because water is the essence of life, I think. If it isn't, it should be."
- (About the field of grass) "Finally, something more boring than Jason Bateman."

On April 1, the show was marked as "Canceled" in bold letters across the image, with the show's description including an explanation that Netflix overestimated the number of people that liked binge-watching microwaves and that "Dave from analytics" was in trouble.

=== 2018 ===
Netflix released a video starring Seth Rogen and Lonny Ross in which Seth signs a contract stating Netflix will now own Seth's mind, body, and soul in order for him to come up with original movie ideas for Netflix. All Netflix has to do in return is air Seth's Hilarity for Charity special.

== See also ==
- List of Google April Fools' Day jokes
