= Dead fairy hoax =

2007 April Fools' Day prank

The dead fairy hoax was an April Fools' Day prank in 2007. Dan Baines, a sculptor and illusion designer, managed to sell his creation, the fake corpse of a fairy, on an internet auction for nearly £300.

== The hoax ==
A few days before April 1, 2007, Dan Baines, a 31-year-old illusion designer for magicians from London, posted images on his website purporting to show the remains of a fairy. He claimed the mummified remains were discovered by a dog walker at Firestone Hill in Duffield, Derbyshire. The "corpse", as shown in the pictures, had intact ears, wings, hair, skin and teeth, and had, according to Baines, ‘been examined by anthropologists and forensic experts who can confirm the body is genuine’. According to the website, X-rays of the 'fairy' showed that its body's structure was the same as that of a child. The bones, however, were described to be ‘hollow like those of a bird, making them particularly light.’

In spite of the coming of April Fool's Day, the website received feedback from a large number of fairy believers, accumulating over 20,000 hits in one day. On April first, Baines appended a note to the website, thanking the readers for expressing their interest in his story and acknowledging that the fairy corpse was fake. He wrote: "Even if you believe in fairies, as I personally do, there will always have been an element of doubt in your mind that would suggest the remains are a hoax. However, the magic created by the possibility of the fairy being real is something you will remember for the rest of your life." Subsequently, Baines listed the mummified fairy on eBay and the model attracted nearly 40 bids. The highest at the close of the sale was made by a private art collector in the United States and the fairy was sold for £280.

== Response ==
Baines received hundreds of emails in response, including comments from those who claimed to have found similar fairy remains. When Baines admitted that the dead fairy was in fact a model created by himself as an April Fools' prank and its back-story was a hoax, some still believed it was genuine, accusing Baines of covering up the 'truth' about the existence of fairies and deliberately issuing false information to harm the credibility of those who believe in them. It was noted that the number of queries sent to Baines regarding the dead fairy did not slow down after the revelation of his hoax. After the event, he described the response to his prank as "uncanny" and that it had taken him up to four hours a day to respond to the emails he had been receiving regarding the subject.
