= Mike McCurry (press secretary) =

White House press secretary (born 1954)

20th White House Press Secretary
- In office December 22, 1994 – August 4, 1998
- President: Bill Clinton
- Preceded by: Dee Dee Myers
- Succeeded by: Joe Lockhart

15th Spokesperson for the United States Department of State
- In office 1993–1995
- Preceded by: Richard Boucher
- Succeeded by: R. Nicholas Burns

Personal details
- Born: Michael Demaree McCurry; October 27, 1954 (age 72) Charleston, South Carolina, U.S.
- Party: Democratic
- Education: Princeton University (BA); Georgetown University (MA); Wesley Theological Seminary (MA)

Michael Demaree McCurry (born October 27, 1954) is an American communications consultant who served as the 20th White House press secretary from 1994 to 1998 under President Bill Clinton.

McCurry is associated with the firm Public Strategies Washington, Inc. He is also active within the administration of the United Methodist Church, serving as a lay delegate to the Church General Conference and on various denominational boards. From 2009 to 2017, he co-chaired the Commission on Presidential Debates. Born in Charleston, South Carolina, he was educated at Princeton University and Georgetown University.

== Education and early career ==
McCurry was born in Charleston, South Carolina, and raised in the San Francisco Bay Area. He attended San Carlos High School on the San Francisco Peninsula from 1969 to 1971 and then transferred to Ravenswood High School in East Palo Alto, where he graduated in 1972. During his senior year in high school, McCurry served as Governor of the California Junior State, a student-run mock government that today is better known as the Junior State of America.

McCurry earned his bachelor of arts degree from Princeton University in 1976 and a master of arts degree from Georgetown University in 1985. He began his political career as press secretary to the Committee on Labor and Human Resources, as well as press secretary to Senator Harrison A. Williams from 1976 to 1981. Between 1981 and 1983, he served as press secretary to Senator Daniel Patrick Moynihan.

From 1988 to 1990, McCurry served as director of communications for the Democratic National Committee, and served as press secretary for the presidential campaigns of John Glenn (1984), Bruce Babbitt (1988), and Bob Kerrey, (1992), as well as the 1988 vice-presidential campaign for Lloyd Bentsen.

Prior to serving in the White House as press secretary to Clinton, McCurry served as spokesman for the Department of State from 1993 to 1995, as well as chief spokesman for Warren Christopher.

== Post-Clinton career ==
McCurry serves on numerous boards or advisory councils for organizations including Share Our Strength, the Junior State of America Foundation, Children's Scholarship Fund, the Wesley Theological Seminary, United Methodist Communications and the White House Historical Association. He is co-chairman of the Commission on Presidential Debates.

He once responded to the Taco Liberty Bell incident by saying that the federal government was also "selling the Lincoln Memorial to Ford Motor Co. and renaming it the Lincoln-Mercury Memorial". He was well respected by the press corps during his tenure, but his honesty and competency were not always appreciated by his colleagues. In 1998 he expressed doubts about Bill Clinton's fitness to remain in office.

Starting May 2005, McCurry was a contributing blogger at The Huffington Post; as of November 2008, however his most recent contribution was dated May 2006. In December 2008, McCurry wrote "How my party found God" for The Daily Beast. In the biographical blurb with the column, it was reported that he was a graduate student at Wesley Theological Seminary.

McCurry is a partner at the influential Washington, D.C.–based government relations firm Public Strategies Washington, Inc. In 2006, in his position as co-chairman of Hands Off the Internet, he lobbied against Internet regulations in the controversial network neutrality debate.

On April 15, 2009, it was announced that McCurry and George W. Bush press secretary Ari Fleischer would both work as temporary media aides to Conservative Prime Minister of Canada Stephen Harper. The two aides were enlisted by the PMO to elevate Harper's and Canada's profiles with American news outlets.

In a later round of the network neutrality fight, in 2011, McCurry came out in favor of the Stop Online Piracy Act (SOPA)/Protect IP Act, representing them as a way to combat online theft. In an opinion piece in Politico on the subject, which drew a favorable comment from the MPAA, McCurry said the new proposals addressed concerns of past critics.

On June 15, 2011, McCurry and Arts + Labs co-chair Mark McKinnon sponsored the "CREATE—A Forum on Creativity, Commerce, Copyright, Counterfeiting and Policy" conference with members of Congress, artists and information-business executives.

Political offices
Preceded by Dee Dee Myers	White House Press Secretary; 1994–1998	Succeeded by Joe Lockhart
