= British MPs sponsored by mining unions =

Several British members of Parliament have been sponsored by mining trade unions. Many were sponsored by the National Union of Mineworkers, its predecessor the Miners' Federation of Great Britain, and the local trade unions which preceded it.

A small number of MPs were sponsored by other trade unions related to the mining industry, such as the Cumberland Iron Ore Miners' and Kindred Trades' Association, the North Wales Quarrymen's Union, and the National Association of Colliery Overmen, Deputies and Shotfirers, and are covered in the articles on those unions. Other miners and people related to the mining industry were elected without being sponsored by a trade union, and are not listed here.

== History ==
John Normansell, leader of the South Yorkshire Miners' Association, presented a paper at the 1869 Trades Union Congress, on "the best means to secure the direct representation of labour in the Commons". This led to the formation of the Labour Representation League, but miners did not initially join the organisation.

At the 1874 United Kingdom general election, four miners stood for Parliament, with two winning seats, the first working class members of Parliament in the UK. Alexander Macdonald in Stafford stood as "Secretary of the Miners' Association of Scotland and President of the Miners' National Association", and Thomas Burt in Morpeth stood as a "Radical Labour" candidate. However, both worked with the Liberal Party in Parliament, and they were the first members of what became known as the Liberal-Labour group. Their seats were held at the 1880 United Kingdom general election, and from 1884 the Miners' National Union founded local political associations in areas where there were many miners. The Reform Act 1885 enfranchised many miners in rural areas for the first time, and this allowed six miners to win election. In 1886, the local political association formed the Labour Electoral Association, and when the Miners' Federation of Great Britain (MFGB) was founded in 1889, its affiliated unions continued to support liberal candidates through the association.

Keir Hardie, of the Ayrshire Miners' Union, first won a seat as an independent at the 1892 United Kingdom general election, and this spurred him to form the Independent Labour Party and, in 1900, the Labour Representation Committee (LRC). The MFGB initially believed that the committee would not be successful and remained apart, but from 1902 it raised a centralised Labour Political Fund of one shilling per member, to stand working coal miners or officials as Parliamentary candidates, and then to support successful members of Parliament, as they were otherwise unpaid. Candidates were free to stand under the label of any political party, or as independents, although in practice affiliations were agreed with the local union. At the 1906 United Kingdom general election, this led to the election of eleven out of sixteen MFGB candidates.

In 1906, the MFGB narrowly voted against affiliating to the LRC. By 1908, the LRC had become the Labour Party, and a second vote was held, this time resulting in a clear majority for affiliation. Some existing MPs were reluctant to transfer, so it was agreed that they would not have to join the Labour Party group in Parliament until the next general election. This was held in January 1910, and resulted in fifteen mining trade union MPs, approximately a third of the total size of the party. However, a few mining MPs refused to take the Labour whip, and remained part of the Liberal-Labour group until 1918.

Miners were uniquely well placed to win seats in Parliament; by 1918, they constituted more than 30% of the total electorate of forty constituencies, and unlike many other unions, the MFGB focused on standing members in these seats, where it had the strongest membership. After 1918, Labour won the majority of seats in the coalfields. In Yorkshire, Derbyshire and Durham, the county unions increased political levies, to employ political organisers and election agents, and also support more union members in local elections. While the miners' union MPs suffered in the 1931 United Kingdom general election, alongside the party as a whole, things soon rebounded. The MFGB remained the largest union in the country until 1937, and also had sponsored the most Labour Party candidates, had the largest number of members affiliated to the Labour Party, and typically had the largest political fund of any union. This ensured that it remained influential and able to get its members selected in many promising constituencies.

The choice of candidates remained in the hands of the county unions affiliated to the MFGB. Half of the MFGB's political fund was retained by its affiliates, enabling them to conduct additional political activity, such as campaigning for other Labour candidates. The South Wales Miners' Federation instead used the funds to sponsor additional candidates, so that by 1931 it stood 10 candidates, despite the MFGB only directly providing enough funding for five. This election saw the peak of MFGB influence, with half of all the Labour MPs elected being sponsored by the union.

The mining MPs were not compelled to vote in the interests of the union, and were sometimes in conflict with it, but there was generally a close relationship. The MFGB got the MPs to propose legislation which it favoured, organise access to the government, and to ask questions and obtain information from government ministers.

The MFGB reformed as the more centralised National Union of Mineworkers (NUM) in 1945, the affiliated unions becoming areas of the NUM. The number of coal miners, and with it the membership of the NUM, steadily declined, and with it the number of safe mining constituencies, and the number of sponsored candidates, which reached a low of 13 in 1987. While the selection of candidates remained a matter for the areas, they were required to be members of the NUM, and have worked in the mines or for the union for at least five years. By the 1970s, the union was tending to select younger candidates. However, unlike many other unions, it did not sponsor existing MPs from outside the industry, and as a result, by the late 1980s, none of its MPs held leading roles in the Labour Party.

== Lib-Lab candidates ==
=== 1874 general election ===
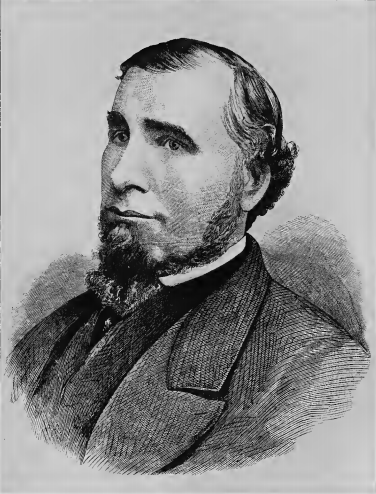
Alexander Macdonald, one of the first two mining MPs

Thomas Burt, one of the first two mining MPs

Constituency	Candidate	Votes	%	Position	Sponsor
Merthyr Tydfil	Thomas Halliday	4,912	25.3	3	Amalgamated Association
Morpeth	Thomas Burt	3,332	85.1	1	Northumberland
Stafford	Alexander Macdonald	1,183	27.7	2	National Union
Wigan	William Pickard	1,134	12.7	4	Amalgamated Association

Macdonald was elected by taking second place in a two-seat constituency.

=== 1880 general election ===
Constituency	Candidate	Votes	%	Position	Sponsor
Morpeth	Thomas Burt	unopposed	N/A	1	Northumberland
Stafford	Alexander Macdonald	1,345	25.8	1	National Union

Macdonald was elected by taking second place in a two-seat constituency

=== 1885 general election ===
Constituency	Candidate	Votes	%	Position	Sponsor
Chesterfield	James Haslam	1,907	25.6	3	Derbyshire
Houghton-le-Spring	John Wilson	6,511	57.7	1	Durham
Mid Durham	William Crawford	5,799	64.1	1	Durham
Morpeth	Thomas Burt	unopposed	N/A	1	Northumberland
Normanton	Ben Pickard	5,615	60.2	1	Yorkshire
Rhondda	William Abraham	3,859	56.3	1	Cambrian
Wansbeck	Charles Fenwick	5,858	68.4	1	Northumberland

Abraham stood as an independent Liberal-Labour candidate.

=== 1886 general election ===
Constituency	Candidate	Votes	%	Position	Sponsor
Houghton-le-Spring	John Wilson	5,059	46.3	2	Durham
Mid Durham	William Crawford	unopposed	N/A	1	Durham
Morpeth	Thomas Burt	unopposed	N/A	1	Northumberland
Normanton	Ben Pickard	4,771	56.2	1	Yorkshire
Rhondda	William Abraham	unopposed	N/A	1	Cambrian
Wansbeck	Charles Fenwick	5,235	75.4	1	Northumberland

=== By-elections, 1886–1892 ===
John Wilson, MP from 1885 to 1886, and 1890 to 1915

By-election	Candidate	Votes	%	Position	Sponsor
1890 Mid Durham by-election	John Wilson	5,468	61.8	1	Durham

=== 1892 general election ===
Constituency	Candidate	Votes	%	Position	Sponsor
Ince	Sam Woods	4,579	51.3	1	Lancashire and Cheshire
Mid Durham	John Wilson	5,661	60.7	1	Durham
Morpeth	Thomas Burt	unopposed	N/A	1	Northumberland
Normanton	Ben Pickard	6,134	61.7	1	Yorkshire
Rhondda	William Abraham	unopposed	N/A	1	Cambrian
Wansbeck	Charles Fenwick	5,696	66.1	1	Northumberland
Wigan	Thomas Aspinwall	3,312	49.2	2	Lancashire and Cheshire

=== 1895 general election ===
William Abraham, MP from 1885 to 1920

Constituency	Candidate	Votes	%	Position	Sponsor
Ince	Sam Woods	4,790	47.8	2	Lancashire and Cheshire
Mid Durham	John Wilson	5,937	58.0	1	Durham
Morpeth	Thomas Burt	3,404	73.4	1	Northumberland
Normanton	Ben Pickard	5,499	58.3	1	Yorkshire
Rhondda	William Abraham	unopposed	N/A	1	Cambrian
Wansbeck	Charles Fenwick	5,629	69.9	1	Northumberland
Wigan	Thomas Aspinwall	3,075	43.8	2	Lancashire and Cheshire

=== 1900 general election ===
Constituency	Candidate	Votes	%	Position	Sponsor
Hanley	Enoch Edwards	5,944	47.4	1	Midland
Mid Durham	John Wilson	5,565	57.5	1	Durham
Morpeth	Thomas Burt	3,117	53.5	1	Northumberland
Normanton	Ben Pickard	5,025	58.2	1	Yorkshire
Nuneaton	William Johnson	4,432	43.6	2	Midland
Rhondda	William Abraham	8,383	81.7	1	South Wales
Wansbeck	Charles Fenwick	5,474	56.1	1	Northumberland

=== By-elections, 1900–1906 ===
Fred Hall, MP from 1905 to 1933

By-election	Candidate	Votes	%	Position	Sponsor
1904 Gateshead by-election	John Johnson	8,220	54.0	1	Durham
1904 Normanton by-election	William Parrott	6,855	70.2	1	Yorkshire
1904 West Monmouthshire by-election	Thomas Richards	7,995	70.4	1	South Wales
1905 Normanton by-election	Frederick Hall	unopposed	N/A	1	Yorkshire

=== 1906 general election ===
Constituency	Candidate	Votes	%	Position	Sponsor
Chesterfield	James Haslam	7,254	56.5	1	Derbyshire
Gateshead	John Johnson	9,651	65.3	1	Durham
Gower	John Williams	4,841	42.8	1	South Wales
Hallamshire	John Wadsworth	8,375	55.2	1	Yorkshire
Hanley	Enoch Edwards	9,183	68.2	1	Midland
Mid Durham	John Wilson	unopposed	N/A	1	Durham
Morpeth	Thomas Burt	5,518	74.2	1	Northumberland
Normanton	Frederick Hall	unopposed	N/A	1	Yorkshire
Nuneaton	William Johnson	7,677	56.8	1	Midland
Rhondda	William Abraham	unopposed	N/A	1	South Wales
South Glamorganshire	William Brace	10,514	63.3	1	South Wales
Wansbeck	Charles Fenwick	10,386	76.4	1	Northumberland
West Monmouthshire	Thomas Richards	unopposed	N/A	1	South Wales

=== By-elections, 1906–1910 ===
By-election	Candidate	Votes	%	Position	Sponsor
1907 North East Derbyshire by-election	W. E. Harvey	6,644	52.9	1	Derbyshire
1907 North West Staffordshire by-election	Albert Stanley	7,396	59.4	1	Midland

=== January 1910 general election ===
Constituency	Candidate	Votes	%	Position	Sponsor
Mid Durham	John Wilson	unopposed	N/A	1	Durham
Morpeth	Thomas Burt	5,874	66.1	1	Northumberland
Wansbeck	Charles Fenwick	10,872	70.0	1	Northumberland

=== December 1910 general election ===
Constituency	Candidate	Votes	%	Position	Sponsor
Mid Durham	John Wilson	unopposed	N/A	1	Durham
Morpeth	Thomas Burt	unopposed	N/A	1	Northumberland
Wansbeck	Charles Fenwick	unopposed	N/A	1	Northumberland

=== By-elections, 1910–1918 ===
Barnet Kenyon, MP from 1913

By-election	Candidate	Votes	%	Position	Sponsor
1913 Chesterfield by-election	Barnet Kenyon	7,725	55.8	1	Derbyshire
1915 Mid Durham by-election	Samuel Galbraith	unopposed	N/A	1	Durham

== Other parties ==
Party	Election	Constituency	Candidate	Votes	%	Position	Sponsor
Scottish United Trades Councils Labour Party	1892 United Kingdom general election	Edinburgh Central	John Wilson	434	7.3	3	Scottish
Scottish United Trades Councils Labour Party	1892 United Kingdom general election	Stirlingshire	Robert Chisholm Robertson	663	6.3	3	Scottish
Scottish Labour Party	1894 Mid Lanarkshire by-election	Mid Lanarkshire	1,221	13.8	3		Scottish
Independent Labour Party	1895 United Kingdom general election	Glasgow Camlachie	Robert Smillie	696	10.9	3	Scottish
Independent Labour	1906 United Kingdom general election	Chester-le-Street	John Wilkinson Taylor	8,805	45.6	1	Durham Colliery Mechanics
Independent Labour	1918 by-election	Wansbeck	Ebby Edwards	5,267	47.5	2	Northumberland

== Scottish Workers' Representation Committee ==
=== By-elections, 1900–1906 ===
Election	Candidate	Votes	Percentage	Position	Sponsor
1901 North East Lanarkshire by-election	Robert Smillie	2,900	21.7	3	Scottish
1904 North East Lanarkshire by-election	John Robertson	3,984	27.9	3	Scottish

=== 1906 UK general election ===
Constituency	Candidate	Votes	Percentage	Position	Sponsor
Falkirk Burghs	David Gilmour	1,763	17.5	3	Scottish
North Ayrshire	James Brown	2,684	20.8	3	Scottish
North East Lanarkshire	John Robertson	4,658	29.2	3	Scottish
North West Lanarkshire	Joseph Sullivan	3,291	23.9	3	Scottish
Paisley	Robert Smillie	2,482	23.1	3	Scottish

== Labour candidates ==
=== 1906 general election ===
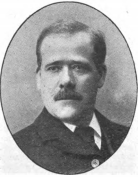
Stephen Walsh, MP from 1906 to 1929

Constituency	Candidate	Votes	%	Position	Sponsor
Ince	Stephen Walsh	8,046	70.2	1	Lancashire and Cheshire
St Helens	Thomas Glover	6,088	56.6	1	Lancashire and Cheshire

=== By-elections, 1906–1910 ===
By-election	Candidate	Votes	%	Position
1906 Cockermouth by-election	Robert Smillie	1,436	14.5	3
1909 Mid Derbyshire by-election	John George Hancock	6,735	60.5	1

=== January 1910 general election ===
J. E. Sutton, MP from 1910 to 1918, 1922, and 1923 to 1931

Constituency	Candidate	Votes	%	Position
Bishop Auckland	William House	3,993	33.2	2
Chester-le-Street	John Wilkinson Taylor	12,684	64.8	1
Chesterfield	James Haslam	8,234	59.1	1
Gateshead	John Johnson	3,572	21.4	3
Gower	John Williams	9,312	78.6	1
Hallamshire	John Wadsworth	10,193	62.2	1
Hanley	Enoch Edwards	9,199	63.9	1
Ince	Stephen Walsh	7,723	60.6	1
Leigh	Thomas Greenall	3,268	24.7	3
Manchester East	John Edward Sutton	6,110	54.5	1
Mid Derbyshire	John Hancock	7,575	63.9	1
Mid Lanarkshire	Robert Smillie	3,864	25.7	3
Morley	Herbert Smith	2,191	16.1	3
Normanton	Frederick Hall	9,172	72.2	1
North Ayrshire	James Brown	1,801	12.9	3
North East Derbyshire	William Edwin Harvey	8,715	57.6	1
North East Lanarkshire	Joseph Sullivan	2,160	11.8	3
North West Lanarkshire	Robert Small	1,718	9.7	3
North West Staffordshire	Albert Stanley	8,566	59.8	1
Nuneaton	William Johnson	8,154	50.8	1
Rhondda	William Abraham	12,436	78.2	1
St Helens	Thomas Glover	6,512	53.3	1
South Glamorganshire	William Brace	11,612	61.1	1
West Fife	William Adamson	4,736	37.7	2
West Monmouthshire	Thomas Richards	13,295	81.4	1
Whitehaven	Andrew Sharp	825	28.8	3
Wigan	Henry Twist	4,803	52.8	1

=== By-elections, Jan–Dec 1910 ===
By-election	Candidate	Votes	%	Position
1910 Mid Glamorgan by-election	Vernon Hartshorn	6,210	41.0	2

=== December 1910 general election ===
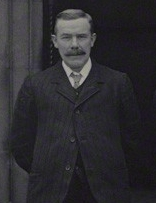
William Adamson, MP from 1910 to 1931

Constituency	Candidate	Votes	%	Position
Bishop Auckland	William House	3,993	33.2	2
Chester-le-Street	John Wilkinson Taylor	unopposed	N/A	1
Chesterfield	James Haslam	7,283	59.0	1
East Glamorgan	Charles Stanton	4,675	24.1	3
Gower	John Williams	5,480	54.8	1
Hallamshire	John Wadsworth	8,708	59.9	1
Hanley	Enoch Edwards	8,343	64.2	1
Ince	Stephen Walsh	7,117	57.2	1
Manchester East	John Edward Sutton	5,524	54.3	1
Mid Derbyshire	John Hancock	6,557	60.5	1
Mid Glamorganshire	Vernon Hartshorn	6,102	44.5	2
Mid Lanarkshire	Robert Smillie	3,847	24.7	3
Normanton	Frederick Hall	unopposed	N/A	1
North East Derbyshire	William Edwin Harvey	7,838	56.3	1
North West Staffordshire	Albert Stanley	8,125	62.2	1
Nuneaton	William Johnson	8,199	52.2	1
Rhondda	William Abraham	9,073	71.0	1
St Helens	Thomas Glover	5,752	48.9	2
South Glamorganshire	William Brace	10,910	58.4	1
West Fife	William Adamson	6,128	53.0	1
West Monmouthshire	Thomas Richards	unopposed	N/A	1
Whitehaven	Thomas Richardson	1,414	53.7	1
Wigan	Henry Twist	4,110	46.8	2

=== By-elections, 1910–1918 ===
By-election	Candidate	Votes	%	Position
1911 North East Lanarkshire by-election	John Robertson	2,879	16.3	3
1912 Holmfirth by-election	William Lunn	3,195	28.2	3
1912 Hanley by-election	Samuel Finney	1,694	11.8	3
1912 Midlothian by-election	Robert Brown	2,415	16.7	3
1913 Houghton-le-Spring by-election	William House	4,165	26.2	3
1913 South Lanarkshire by-election	Thomas Gibb	1,674	16.8	3
1914 North East Derbyshire by-election	James Martin	3,669	22.5	3
1915 Merthyr Tydfil by-election	James Winstone	6,080	37.2	2
1916 North West Staffordshire by-election	Samuel Finney	unopposed	N/A	1

=== 1918 general election ===
Constituency	Candidate	Votes	%	Position	Sponsor
Abertillery	William Brace	unopposed	N/A	1	South Wales
Barnard Castle	John Edmund Swan	5,468	42.9	1	Durham
Bedwellty	Charles Edwards	11,370	53.6	1	South Wales
Blaydon	William Whiteley	7,844	41.6	2	Durham
Bothwell	John Robertson	9,027	49.1	2	Scottish
Broxtowe	George Alfred Spencer	11,150	55.2	1	Nottinghamshire
Burslem	Samuel Finney	7,474	44.3	1	Midland
Caerphilly	Alfred Onions	11,496	54.8	1	South Wales
Clay Cross	Frank Hall	6,766	45.9	2	Derbyshire
Cleveland	Harry Dack	8,610	35.3	2	Cleveland
Darwen	John McGurk	5,211	23.4	3	Lancashire and Cheshire
Don Valley	Edward Hough	3,226	24.5	3	Yorkshire
Durham	Joshua Ritson	8,809	49.4	2	Durham
Ebbw Vale	Thomas Richards	unopposed	N/A	1	South Wales
Farnworth	Thomas Greenall	9,740	40.8	2	Lancashire and Cheshire
Frome	Edward Gill	10,454	43.9	2	Somerset
Gower	John Williams	10,109	54.8	1	South Wales
Hamilton	Duncan Macgregor Graham	6,988	42.1	1	Scottish
Hemsworth	John Guest	8,102	55.5	1	Yorkshire
Hexham	William Weir	4,168	26.2	2	Northumberland
Houghton-le-Spring	Robert Richardson	7,315	36.4	1	Durham
Ince	Stephen Walsh	14,882	87.0	1	Lancashire and Cheshire
Lichfield	Thomas Riley	5,548	36.4	2	Midland
Manchester Clayton	John Edward Sutton	7,654	38.4	2	Lancashire and Cheshire
Mansfield	William Carter	8,957	43.6	1	Nottinghamshire
Merthyr	James Winstone	12,682	47.3	2	South Wales
Morpeth	John Cairns	7,677	34.3	1	Northumberland
Normanton	Frederick Hall	unopposed	N/A	1	Yorkshire
North East Derbyshire	Frank Lee	5,560	28.6	2	Derbyshire
North Lanarkshire	Joseph Sullivan	5,673	34.1	2	Scottish
Ogmore	Vernon Hartshorn	unopposed	N/A	1	South Wales
Oswestry	Thomas Morris	8,467	40.8	2	North Wales
Peebles and Southern Midlothian	James Gold	4,830	39.4	2	Scottish
Pontefract	Isaac Burns	5,047	37.1	2	Yorkshire
Pontypridd	David Lewis Davies	10,152	42.8	2	South Wales
Rhondda East	David Watts-Morgan	unopposed	N/A	1	South Wales
Rhondda West	William Abraham	unopposed	N/A	1	South Wales
Rother Valley	Thomas Walter Grundy	9,917	55.1	1	Yorkshire
Rothwell	William Lunn	9,098	44.1	1	Yorkshire
Seaham	Jack Lawson	8,988	41.3	2	Durham
Sedgefield	John Herriotts	5,801	36.8	2	Durham
South Ayrshire	James Brown	6,358	37.3	1	Scottish
Spennymoor	Joseph Batey	8,196	46.5	2	Durham
Wallsend	John Chapman	6,835	34.0	2	Northumberland
Wansbeck	Ebenezer Edwards	5,267	47.5	2	Northumberland
Wentworth	George Henry Hirst	13,029	59.8	1	Yorkshire
West Fife	William Adamson	10,664	72.6	1	Scottish
Wigan	John Parkinson	12,914	48.0	1	Lancashire and Cheshire
Workington	Thomas Cape	10,441	51.4	1	Cumberland*

=== By-elections, 1918–1922 ===
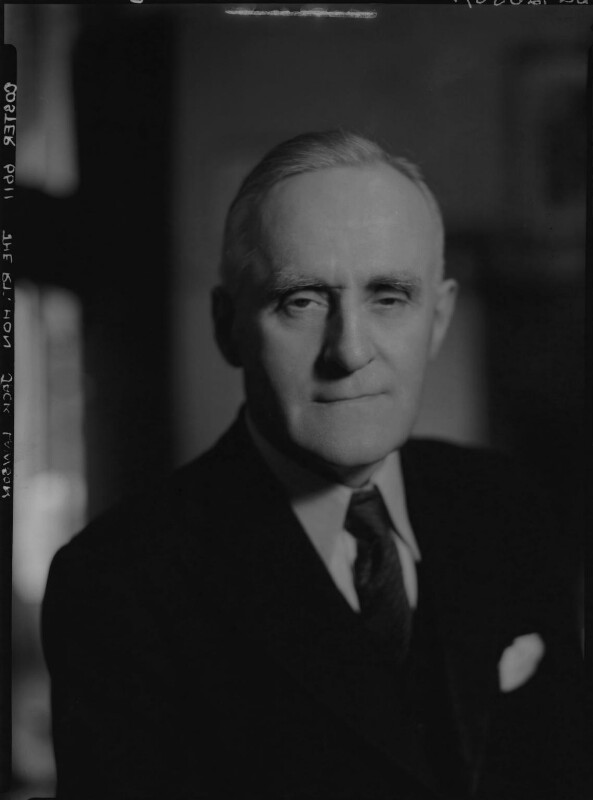
Jack Lawson, MP from 1919 to 1949

By-election	Candidate	Votes	%	Position
1919 Bothwell by-election	John Robertson	13,135	68.8	1
1919 Pontefract by-election	Isaac Burns	8,445	46.0	2
1919 Chester-le-Street by-election	Jack Lawson	17,838	77.1	1
1920 Abertillery by-election	George Barker	15,942	66.4	1
1921 Penistone by-election	William Gillis	8,560	36.2	1
1922 Tamworth by-election	George Henry Jones	6,671	31.2	2
1922 Manchester Clayton by-election	John Edward Sutton	14,662	57.1	1
1922 Gower by-election	David Rhys Grenfell	13,296	57.5	1
1922 Pontypridd by-election	Thomas Isaac Mardy Jones	16,630	57.0	1

=== 1922 general election ===
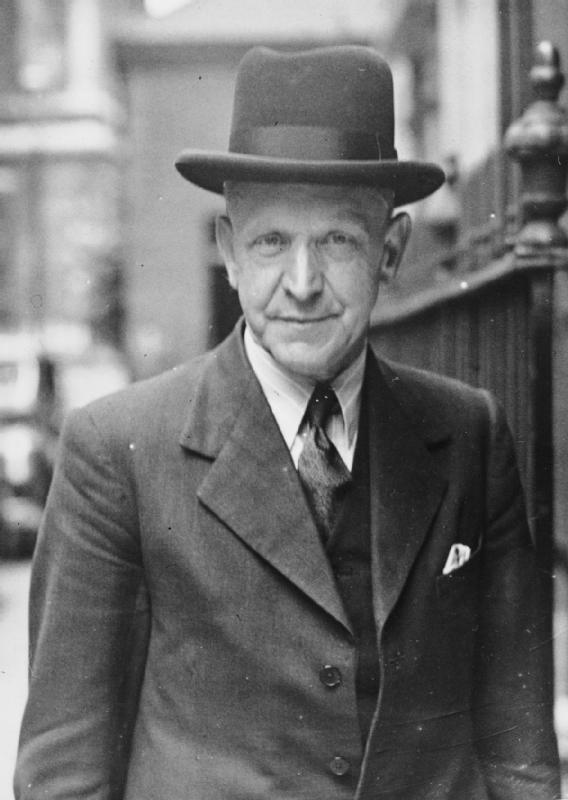
Wilfred Paling, MP from 1922 to 1959

Constituency	Candidate	Votes	%	Position	Sponsor
Aberdare	George Hall	20,704	57.2	1	South Wales
Abertillery	George Barker	unopposed	N/A	1	South Wales
Barnard Castle	John Swan	8,052	49.3	2	Durham
Bedwellty	Charles Edwards	17,270	63.0	1	South Wales
Belper	Oliver Wright	7,942	38.9	2	Derbyshire
Blaydon	William Whiteley	14,722	53.9	1	Durham
Bothwell	John Robertson	13,872	57.0	1	Scottish
Broxtowe	George Spencer	11,699	50.8	1	Nottinghamshire
Chester-le-Street	Jack Lawson	20,296	68.5	1	Durham
Durham	Joshua Ritson	14,068	55.2	1	Durham
Cleveland	Harry Dack	10,843	29.5	3	Cleveland
Darwen	John McGurk	4,528	15.8	3	Lancashire and Cheshire
Doncaster	Wilfred Paling	13,437	46.5	1	Yorkshire
Don Valley	Tom Williams	9,903	47.0	1	Yorkshire
Dunfermline Burghs	William McLean Watson	11,652	50.4	1	Scottish
Ebbw Vale	Evan Davies	16,947	65.4	1	South Wales
Farnworth	Thomas Greenall	13,391	45.6	1	Lancashire and Cheshire
Frome	Edward Gill	14,311	48.8	2	Somerset
Gower	David Rhys Grenfell	13,388	54.2	1	South Wales
Hamilton	Duncan Macgregor Graham	12,365	57.8	1	Scottish
Hemsworth	John Guest	14,295	63.2	1	Yorkshire
Hexham	George Shield	5,050	24.2	3	Northumberland*
Houghton-le-Spring	Robert Richardson	14,611	51.9	1	Durham
Ince	Stephen Walsh	17,332	67.7	1	Lancashire and Cheshire
Leigh	Henry Twist	15,006	45.0	1	Lancashire and Cheshire
Lichfield	Walter John French	9,316	46.8	2	Midland
Manchester Clayton	John Edward Sutton	14,789	50.0	2	Lancashire and Cheshire
Mansfield	William Carter	14,917	48.0	2	Nottinghamshire
Morpeth	John Cairns	15,026	48.3	1	Northumberland
Neath	William Jenkins	19,566	59.5	1	South Wales
Normanton	Frederick Hall	16,040	73.3	1	Yorkshire
North East Derbyshire	Frank Lee	9,359	33.9	1	Derbyshire
North Lanarkshire	Joseph Sullivan	10,349	47.3	1	Scottish
Nuneaton	James Stevenson	10,842	32.5	2	Midland
Ogmore	Vernon Hartshorn	17,321	55.8	1	South Wales
Oswestry	Thomas Morris	6,105	23.8	3	North Wales
Peebles and Southern Midlothian	Joseph Westwood	6,394	36.0	1	Scottish
Penistone	William Gillis	8,382	33.7	2	Yorkshire
Pontefract	Tom Smith	9,111	38.9	1	Yorkshire
Pontypridd	Thomas Isaac Mardy Jones	14,884	47.2	1	South Wales
Rhondda East	David Watts-Morgan	17,146	55.0	1	South Wales
Rhondda West	William John	18,001	62.1	1	South Wales
Rother Valley	Thomas Grundy	unopposed	N/A	1	Yorkshire
Rothwell	William Lunn	17,831	62.8	1	Yorkshire
Sedgefield	John Herriotts	9,756	43.6	1	Durham
South Ayrshire	James Brown	11,511	55.6	1	Scottish
South Shields	Will Lawther	15,735	39.7	2	Durham
Spennymoor	Joseph Batey	13,766	50.3	1	Durham
Stirling and Falkirk	Hugh Murnin	11,073	53.3	1	Scottish*
Wansbeck	George Warne	16,032	45.2	1	Northumberland
Wentworth	George Henry Hirst	unopposed	N/A	1	Yorkshire
West Fife	William Adamson	unopposed	N/A	1	Scottish
Wigan	John Parkinson	20,079	56.5	1	Lancashire and Cheshire
Workington	Thomas Cape	14,546	54.7	1	Cumberland

=== By-elections, 1922–1923 ===
By-election	Candidate	Votes	%	Position	Sponsor
1923 Morpeth by-election	Robert Smillie	20,053	60.5	1	Northumberland

=== 1923 general election ===
Constituency	Candidate	Votes	%	Position	Sponsor
Aberdare	George Hall	22,379	58.2	1	South Wales
Abertillery	George Barker	unopposed	N/A	1	South Wales
Barnsley	John Potts	12,674	48.0	1	Yorkshire
Bedwellty	Charles Edwards	17,564	67.6	1	South Wales
Belper	Oliver Wright	7,284	31.5	2	Derbyshire
Blaydon	William Whiteley	15,073	67.9	1	Durham
Bothwell	John Robertson	14,211	60.2	1	Scottish
Broxtowe	George Spencer	13,219	54.5	1	Nottinghamshire
Chester-le-Street	Jack Lawson	20,712	74.7	1	Durham
Don Valley	Tom Williams	12,898	60.4	1	Yorkshire
Doncaster	Wilfred Paling	16,198	60.6	1	Yorkshire
Dunfermline Burghs	William McLean Watson	12,606	53.6	1	Scottish
Durham	Joshua Ritson	13,819	56.8	1	Durham
Ebbw Vale	Evan Davies	16,492	65.6	1	South Wales
Farnworth	Thomas Greenall	14,858	57.2	1	Lancashire and Cheshire
Gower	David Rhys Grenfell	14,771	59.1	1	South Wales
Hamilton	Duncan Macgregor Graham	11,858	58.4	1	Scottish
Hemsworth	John Guest	13,159	70.1	1	Yorkshire
Houghton-le-Spring	Robert Richardson	15,225	59.3	1	Durham
Ince	Stephen Walsh	17,365	73.5	1	Lancashire and Cheshire
Leigh	Joe Tinker	13,989	43.0	1	Lancashire and Cheshire
Manchester Clayton	John Edward Sutton	17,255	56.7	1	Lancashire and Cheshire
Mansfield	Frank Varley	18,813	57.8	1	Nottinghamshire
Morpeth	Robert Smillie	16,902	64.2	1	Northumberland
Neath	William Jenkins	20,764	62.3	1	South Wales
Normanton	Frederick Hall	15,453	78.0	1	Yorkshire
North East Derbyshire	Frank Lee	10,971	39.5	1	Derbyshire
North Lanarkshire	Joseph Sullivan	10,526	50.5	1	Scottish
Ogmore	Vernon Hartshorn	unopposed	N/A	1	South Wales
Peebles and Southern Midlothian	Joseph Westwood	7,882	43.0	1	Scottish
Pontefract	Tom Smith	11,134	45.3	1	Yorkshire
Pontypridd	Thomas Mardy Jones	16,837	54.9	1	South Wales
Rhondda East	David Watts-Morgan	21,338	71.9	1	South Wales
Rhondda West	William John	18,206	65.4	1	South Wales
Rother Valley	Thomas Walter Grundy	15,967	68.6	1	Yorkshire
Rothwell	William Lunn	15,115	66.0	1	Yorkshire
Sedgefield	John Herriotts	11,087	50.0	2	Durham
South Ayrshire	James Brown	11,169	55.9	1	Scottish
South Shields	Will Lawther	15,717	40.7	2	Durham
Spennymoor	Joseph Batey	15,567	65.7	1	Durham
Stoke	John Watts	12,502	48.8	2	Midland
Wansbeck	George Warne	18,583	56.8	1	Northumberland
Wentworth	George Henry Hirst	unopposed	N/A	1	Yorkshire
West Fife	William Adamson	12,204	65.4	1	Scottish
Wigan	John Allen Parkinson	19,637	57.6	1	Lancashire and Cheshire
Workington	Thomas Cape	15,296	56.5	1	Cumberland

=== 1924 general election ===
Constituency	Candidate	Votes	%	Position	Sponsor
Aberdare	George Hall	20,704	57.2	1	South Wales
Abertillery	George Barker	unopposed	N/A	1	South Wales
Barnsley	John Potts	14,738	51.7	1	Yorkshire
Bedwellty	Charles Edwards	unopposed	N/A	1	South Wales
Blaydon	William Whiteley	17,670	62.6	1	Durham
Bothwell	John Robertson	14,591	56.3	1	Scottish
Broxtowe	George Spencer	15,276	55.4	1	Nottinghamshire
Chester-le-Street	Jack Lawson	22,700	71.0	1	Durham
Cleveland	William Mansfield	11,153	29.4	2	Cleveland
Doncaster	Wilfred Paling	16,496	52.7	1	Yorkshire
Don Valley	Tom Williams	14,958	53.9	1	Yorkshire
Dunfermline Burghs	William McLean Watson	13,887	57.9	1	Scottish
Durham	Joshua Ritson	15,032	54.9	1	Durham
Ebbw Vale	Evan Davies	unopposed	N/A	1	South Wales
Farnworth	Thomas Greenall	15,327	47.5	1	Lancashire and Cheshire
Gower	David Rhys Grenfell	15,374	57.2	1	South Wales
Hamilton	Duncan Macgregor Graham	13,003	60.8	1	Scottish
Hemsworth	John Guest	15,593	69.3	1	Yorkshire
Houghton-le-Spring	Robert Richardson	17,857	57.8	1	Durham
Ince	Stephen Walsh	18,272	70.0	1	Lancashire and Cheshire
Leigh	Joe Tinker	17,262	51.5	1	Lancashire and Cheshire
Lichfield	Frank Hodges	12,512	46.2	2	Midland
Manchester Clayton	John Edward Sutton	17,338	54.2	1	Lancashire and Cheshire
Mansfield	Frank Varley	19,441	59.0	1	Nottinghamshire
Morpeth	Robert Smillie	19,248	56.8	1	Northumberland
Neath	William Jenkins	unopposed	N/A	1	South Wales
Normanton	Frederick Hall	unopposed	N/A	1	Yorkshire
North East Derbyshire	Frank Lee	13,420	44.9	1	Derbyshire
North Lanarkshire	Joseph Sullivan	11,852	46.1	2	Scottish
Ogmore	Vernon Hartshorn	unopposed	N/A	1	South Wales
Peebles and Southern Midlothian	Joseph Westwood	7,797	40.8	1	Scottish
Pontefract	Tom Smith	13,044	48.7	2	Yorkshire
Pontypridd	Thomas Mardy-Jones	18,301	55.9	1	South Wales
Rhondda East	David Watts-Morgan	unopposed	N/A	1	South Wales
Rhondda West	William John	unopposed	N/A	1	South Wales
Rother Valley	Thomas Walter Grundy	18,750	65.3	1	Yorkshire
Rothwell	William Lunn	16,540	61.8	1	Yorkshire
Sedgefield	John Herriotts	12,552	47.3	2	Durham
South Ayrshire	James Brown	11,313	50.4	1	Scottish
South Shields	Will Lawther	16,852	42.1	2	Durham
Spennymoor	Joseph Batey	17,211	63.0	1	Durham
Stirling and Falkirk	Hugh Murnin	13,436	53.9	1	Scottish*
Stoke	John Watts	13,318	42.7	2	Midland
Wansbeck	George Warne	21,159	52.9	1	Northumberland
Wentworth	George Hirst	unopposed	N/A	1	Yorkshire
West Fife	William Adamson	14,685	70.9	1	Scottish
Wigan	John Parkinson	20,350	57.6	1	Lancashire and Cheshire
Workington	Thomas Cape	15,353	55.6	1	Cumberland

=== By-elections, 1924–1929 ===
By-election	Candidate	Votes	%	Position	Sponsor
1926 Bothwell by-election	Joseph Sullivan	14,830	59.7	1	
1929 Wansbeck by-election	George Shield	20,398	58.0	1	Northumberland

=== 1929 general election ===
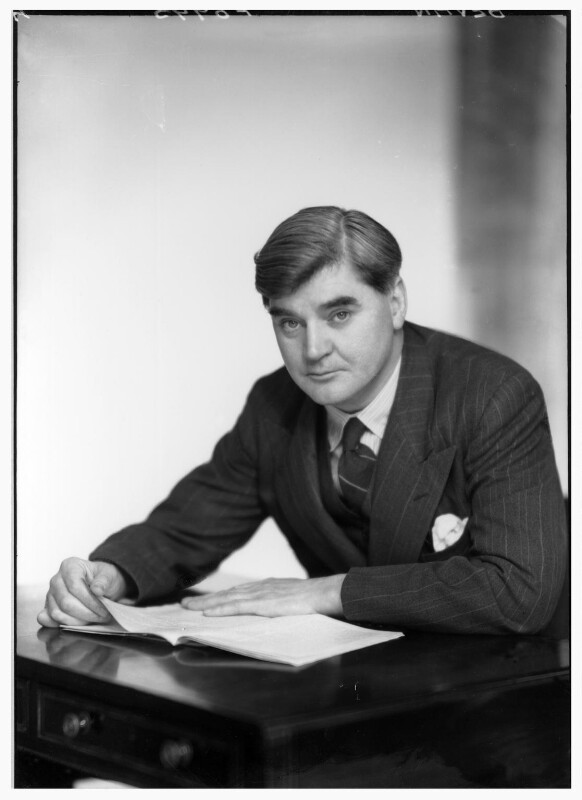
Aneurin Bevan, MP from 1929 to 1960

Constituency	Candidate	Votes	%	Position	Sponsor
Aberdare	George Hall	29,550	64.6	1	South Wales
Abertillery	George Daggar	20,175	64.5	1	South Wales
Barnard Castle	Will Lawther	9,281	42.0	1	Durham
Barnsley	John Potts	21,855	53.8	1	Yorkshire
Bedwellty	Charles Edwards	26,021	79.0	1	South Wales
Blaydon	William Whiteley	21,221	59.1	1	Durham
Bothwell	Joseph Sullivan	17,006	55.3	1	Scottish
Chester-le-Street	Jack Lawson	26,975	69.8	1	Durham
Cleveland	William Mansfield	16,938	36.3	1	Cleveland
Don Valley	Tom Williams	31,466	73.3	1	Yorkshire
Doncaster	Wilfred Paling	25,295	56.0	1	Yorkshire
Dunfermline Burghs	William McLean Watson	15,288	58.5	1	Scottish
Durham	Joshua Ritson	18,514	56.8	1	Durham
Ebbw Vale	Aneurin Bevan	20,088	60.3	1	South Wales
Farnworth	Guy Rowson	21,857	52.2	1	Lancashire and Cheshire
Gower	David Rhys Grenfell	20,664	54.0	1	South Wales
Hamilton	Duncan Graham	16,595	67.1	1	Scottish
Hemsworth	John Guest	26,075	79.9	1	Yorkshire
Houghton-le-Spring	Robert Richardson	25,056	57.1	1	Durham
Ince	Gordon Macdonald	26,091	73.8	1	Lancashire and Cheshire
Leigh	Joe Tinker	25,635	57.0	1	Lancashire and Cheshire
Manchester Clayton	John Edward Sutton	21,103	55.0	1	Lancashire and Cheshire
Midlothian and Peebles Northern	Andrew Clarke	10,779	37.5	2	
Morpeth	Ebby Edwards	25,508	61.3	1	Northumberland
Neath	William Jenkins	29,455	60.2	1	South Wales
Normanton	Frederick Hall	26,008	83.1	1	Yorkshire
North East Derbyshire	Frank Lee	21,633	54.6	1	Derbyshire
Ogmore	Vernon Hartshorn	22,900	56.7	1	South Wales
Peebles and Southern Midlothian	Joseph Westwood	11,161	45.5	1	Scottish
Penistone	Rennie Smith	17,286	45.2	1	Yorkshire
Pontefract	Tom Smith	17,335	47.8	1	Yorkshire
Pontypridd	Thomas Mardy Jones	20,835	53.1	1	South Wales
Rhondda East	David Watts Morgan	19,010	50.2	1	South Wales
Rhondda West	William John	23,238	65.1	1	South Wales
Rother Valley	Thomas Walter Grundy	30,405	76.3	1	Yorkshire
Rothwell	William Lunn	27,320	61.7	1	Yorkshire
Sedgefield	John Herriotts	15,749	47.7	1	Durham
South Ayrshire	James Brown	16,981	58.1	1	Scottish
Spennymoor	Joseph Batey	20,858	71.8	1	Durham
Stirling and Falkirk	Hugh Murnin	15,408	47.4	1	Scottish
Wansbeck	George Shield	27,930	54.4	1	Northumberland
Wentworth	George Henry Hirst	35,276	75.1	1	Yorkshire
West Fife	William Adamson	17,668	60.0	1	Scottish
Wigan	John Parkinson	27,462	58.5	1	Lancashire and Cheshire
Workington	Thomas Cape	20,591	65.2	1	Cumberland

=== By-elections, 1929–1931 ===
By-election	Candidate	Votes	%	Position
1931 Pontypridd by-election	David Lewis Davies	20,687	59.9	1
1931 Ogmore by-election	Edward Williams	19,356	78.8	1

=== 1931 general election ===
Constituency	Candidate	Votes	%	Position	Sponsor
Aberavon	William Cove	23,029	58.4	1	
Aberdare	George Hall	unopposed	N/A	1	South Wales
Abertillery	George Daggar	unopposed	N/A	1	South Wales
Barnard Castle	Will Lawther	10,287	44.7	2	Durham
Barnsley	John Potts	20,622	49.1	2	Yorkshire
Bedwellty	Charles Edwards	unopposed	N/A	1	South Wales
Blaydon	William Whiteley	18,431	49.3	2	Durham
Bothwell	Joseph Sullivan	14,423	43.5	2	Scottish
Cleveland	William Mansfield	20,060	39.6	2	Cleveland
Doncaster	Wilfred Paling	22,363	45.1	2	Yorkshire
Don Valley	Tom Williams	27,599	58.6	1	Yorkshire
Durham	Joshua Ritson	17,136	49.6	2	Durham
Ebbw Vale	Aneurin Bevan	unopposed	N/A	1	South Wales
Farnworth	Guy Rowson	19,553	46.5	2	Lancashire and Cheshire
Gower	David Rhys Grenfell	21,963	53.4	1	South Wales
Hamilton	Duncan Macgregor Graham	14,233	53.9	1	Scottish
Hemsworth	Gabriel Price	23,609	70.5	1	Yorkshire
Houghton-le-Spring	Robert Richardson	22,700	47.1	2	Durham
Ince	Gordon Macdonald	23,237	63.4	1	Lancashire and Cheshire
Leigh	Joe Tinker	23,965	52.3	1	Lancashire and Cheshire
Manchester Clayton	John Edward Sutton	17,169	43.8	2	Lancashire and Cheshire
Morpeth	Ebby Edwards	18,174	48.7	2	Northumberland
Neath	William Jenkins	30,873	64.0	1	South Wales
Normanton	Frederick Hall	22,877	69.6	1	Yorkshire
North East Derbyshire	Frank Lee	19,385	47.5	2	Derbyshire
Ogmore	Edward Williams	23,064	61.0	1	South Wales
Peebles and Southern Midlothian	Joseph Westwood	9,185	34.5	2	Scottish
Pontefract	Tom Smith	16,870	44.6	2	Yorkshire
Pontypridd	David Lewis Davies	21,751	58.4	1	South Wales
Rhondda East	David Watts-Morgan	22,086	68.1	1	South Wales
Rhondda West	William John	23,024	84.3	1	South Wales
Rother Valley	Thomas Walter Grundy	26,185	62.3	1	Yorkshire
Rothwell	William Lunn	24,897	52.9	1	Yorkshire
Sedgefield	John Herriotts	15,404	41.2	2	Durham
South Ayrshire	James Brown	13,733	45.2	2	Scottish
Spennymoor	Joseph Batey	18,072	56.2	1	Durham
Stirling and Falkirk Burghs	Hugh Murnin	12,483	36.4	2	Scottish
Wansbeck	George Shield	24,126	41.8	2	Northumberland
Wentworth	George Henry Hirst	31,861	68.8	1	Yorkshire
West Fife	William Adamson	11,063	35.8	2	Scottish
Wigan	John Parkinson	23,544	51.1	1	Lancashire and Cheshire
Workington	Thomas Cape	18,469	54.9	1	Cumberland

=== By-elections, 1931–1935 ===
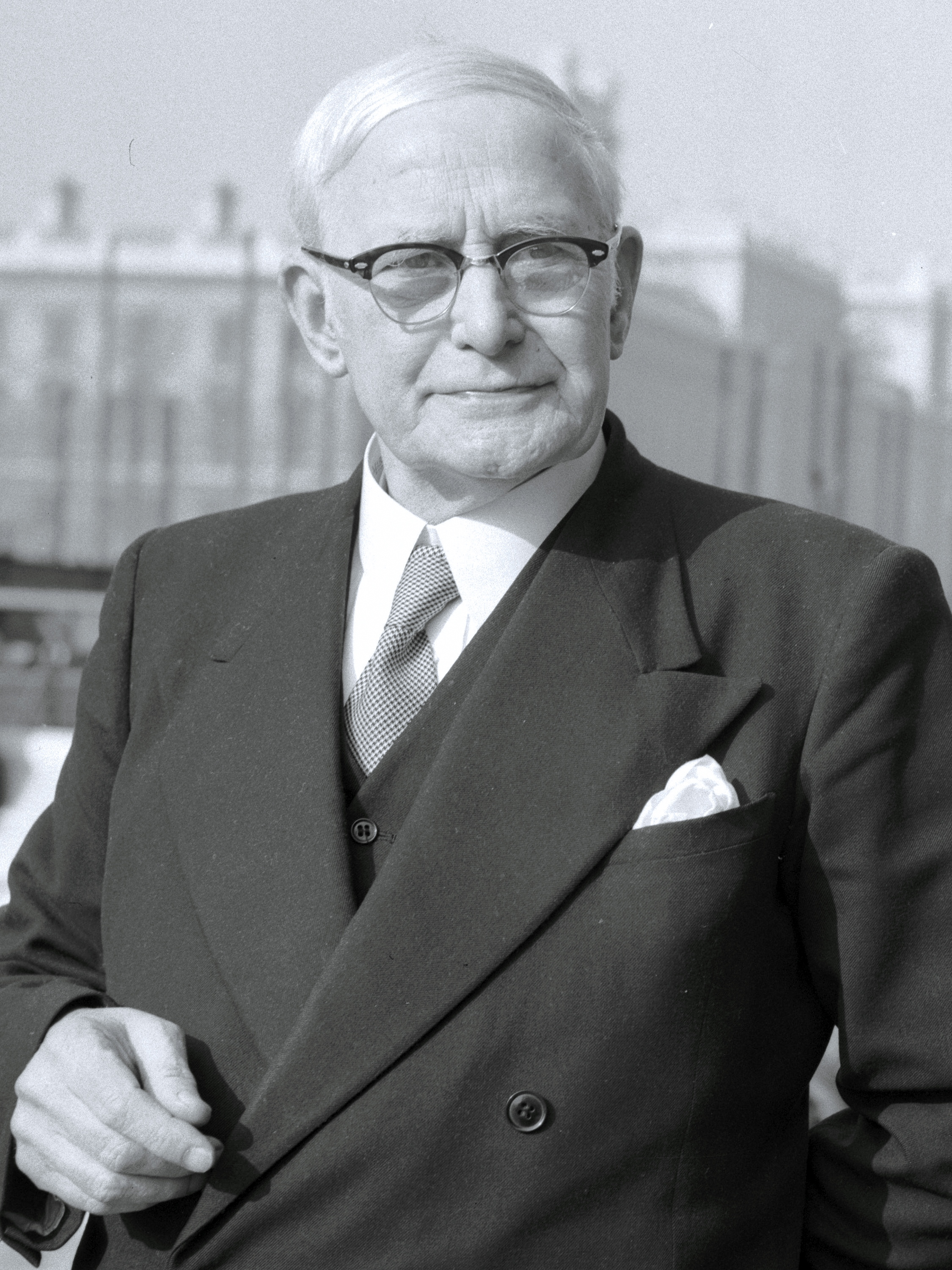
S. O. Davies, MP from 1934

By-election	Candidate	Votes	%	Position
1933 Rhondda East by-election	William Mainwaring	14,127	42.5	1
1933 Normanton by-election	Tom Smith	unopposed	N/A	1
1933 Wentworth by-election	Wilfred Paling	unopposed	N/A	1
1934 Hemsworth by-election	George Griffiths	unopposed	N/A	1
1934 Merthyr by-election	S. O. Davies	18,645	51.8	1

=== 1935 general election ===
Constituency	Candidate	Votes	%	Position	Sponsor
Aberdare	George Hall	unopposed	N/A	1	South Wales
Abertillery	George Daggar	unopposed	N/A	1	South Wales
Barnsley	John Potts	25,318	58.9	1	Yorkshire
Bedwellty	Charles Edwards	unopposed	N/A	1	South Wales
Berwick and Haddington	John Robertson	14,299	41.9	2	Scottish
Blaydon	William Whiteley	24,148	62.3	1	Durham
Bothwell	James C. Welsh	20,900	60.3	1	Scottish
Chester-le-Street	Jack Lawson	29,111	71.0	1	Durham
Don Valley	Tom Williams	33,220	68.9	1	Yorkshire
Dunfermline Burghs	William McLean Watson	16,271	52.3	1	Scottish
Durham	Joshua Ritson	21,517	59.1	1	Durham
Ebbw Vale	Aneurin Bevan	25,007	77.8	1	South Wales
Farnworth	Guy Rowson	22,040	51.7	1	Lancashire and Cheshire
Gower	David Grenfell	25,632	66.8	1	South Wales
Hamilton	Duncan Graham	17,049	65.7	1	Scottish
Hemsworth	George Griffiths	28,298	80.1	1	Yorkshire
Houghton-le-Spring	William Stewart	30,665	57.2	1	Durham
Ince	Gordon Macdonald	26,334	72.6	1	Lancashire and Cheshire
Leigh	Joe Tinker	unopposed	N/A	1	Lancashire and Cheshire
Lichfield	George Henry Jones	20,191	46.2	2	Midland
Merthyr	S. O. Davies	20,530	68.0	1	South Wales
Morpeth	Robert Taylor	28,900	59.2	1	Northumberland
Neath	William Jenkins	unopposed	N/A	1	South Wales
Normanton	Tom Smith	26,705	81.4	1	Yorkshire
North East Derbyshire	Frank Lee	25,382	57.2	1	Derbyshire
Ogmore	Ted Williams	unopposed	N/A	1	South Wales
Peebles and South Midlothian	David Pryde	12,209	47.2	2	Scottish
Pontypridd	David Lewis Davies	unopposed	N/A	1	South Wales
Rhondda East	William Mainwaring	22,088	61.8	1	South Wales
Rhondda West	William John	unopposed	N/A	1	South Wales
Rother Valley	Edward Dunn	33,271	72.0	1	Yorkshire
Rothwell	William Lunn	31,472	64.5	1	Yorkshire
South Ayrshire	James Brown	18,190	57.6	1	Scottish
Spennymoor	Joseph Batey	21,473	71.2	1	Durham
Wansbeck	Edward Dowling	29,904	49.2	2	Northumberland
Wentworth	Wilfred Paling	37,471	82.1	1	Yorkshire
West Fife	William Adamson	12,869	35.7	2	Scottish
Wigan	John Parkinson	27,950	61.3	1	Lancashire and Cheshire
Workington	Thomas Cape	unopposed	N/A	1	Cumberland

=== By-elections, 1935–1945 ===
By-election	Candidate	Votes	%	Position
1936 Llanelly by-election	Jim Griffiths	32,188	66.8	1
1938 Barnsley by-election	Frank Collindridge	23,566	64.4	1
1939 South Ayrshire by-election	Alexander Sloan	17,908	58.0	1
1942 North East Derbyshire by-election	Henry White	unopposed	N/A	1
1942 Wigan by-election	William Foster	unopposed	N/A	1
1942 Spennymoor by-election	James Murray	unopposed	N/A	1
1942 Rothwell by-election	Thomas Brooks	unopposed	N/A	1
1942 Ince by-election	Tom Brown	unopposed	N/A	1
1943 Hamilton by-election	Tom Fraser	unopposed	N/A	1
1943 Consett by-election	James Glanville	unopposed	N/A	1
1944 Clay Cross by-election	Harold Neal	13,693	76.3	1
1945 Neath by-election	D. J. Williams	30,847	79.3	1

=== 1945 general election ===
Constituency	Candidate	Votes	%	Position
Barnsley	Frank Collindridge	30,614	72.9	1
Bedwellty	Charles Edwards	30,480	82.1	1
Blaydon	William Whiteley	29,931	71.7	1
Bothwell	John Timmons	25,369	65.8	1
Caerphilly	Ness Edwards	29,158	80.2	1
Chester-le-Street	Jack Lawson	33,788	76.8	1
Clay Cross	Harold Neal	27,538	82.1	1
Consett	James Glanville	28,617	70.1	1
Dewsbury	William Paling	16,330	56.3	1
Don Valley	Thomas Williams	40,153	71.7	1
Dunfermline Burghs	William McLean Watson	22,021	64.7	1
Durham	Charles Grey	24,135	66.2	1
Ebbw Vale	Aneurin Bevan	27,209	80.1	1
Gower	David Grenfell	30,676	68.5	1
Hamilton	Tom Fraser	20,015	73.5	1
Hemsworth	George Griffiths	33,984	81.4	1
Houghton-le-Spring	Billy Blyton	43,730	66.7	1
Ince	Tom Brown	28,702	74.4	1
Kirkcaldy Burghs	Thomas Hubbard	15,401	45.0	1
Llanelly	Jim Griffiths	44,514	81.1	1
Mansfield	Bernard Taylor	43,113	75.1	1
Merthyr	S. O. Davies	24,879	81.4	1
Morpeth	Robert Taylor	38,521	73.2	1
Neath	D. J. Williams	37,957	75.8	1
Normanton	Tom Smith	28,238	84.3	1
North East Derbyshire	Henry White	35,795	65.6	1
Ogmore	Ted Williams	32,715	76.4	1
Peebles and Southern Midlothian	David Pryde	15,546	55.7	1
Pontypool	Arthur Jenkins	27,455	77.3	1
Rhondda East	William Mainwaring	16,733	48.4	1
Rhondda West	Iorwerth Thomas	unopposed	N/A	1
Rother Valley	David Griffiths	44,449	75.2	1
South Ayrshire	Alexander Sloan	21,235	61.3	1
Spennymoor	James Murray	22,587	69.9	1
Wallsend	John McKay	32,065	60.1	1
Wentworth	Wilfred Paling	44,080	83.6	1
Wigan	William Foster	31,392	68.2	1

=== By-elections, 1945–1950 ===
By-election	Candidate	Votes	%	Position
1946 Hemsworth by-election	Horace Holmes	unopposed	N/A	1
1946 Ogmore by-election	John Evans	13,632	70.6	1
1946 Aberdare by-election	David Thomas	24,215	68.3	1
1947 Normanton by-election	George Sylvester	19,085	79.8	1
1948 Wigan by-election	Ronald Williams	28,941	59.1	1

=== 1950 general election ===
Constituency	Candidate	Votes	%	Position
Aberdare	David Thomas	33,390	75.6	1
Barnsley	Frank Collindridge	42,008	68.6	1
Bedwellty	Harold Finch	31,329	83.4	1
Blaydon	William Whiteley	28,343	68.9	1
Bolsover	Harold Neal	34,017	80.6	1
Bothwell	John Timmons	25,715	56.7	1
Caerphilly	Ness Edwards	30,270	77.5	1
Chester-le-Street	Patrick Bartley	35,348	77.3	1
Consett	James Glanville	34,907	66.8	1
Dearne Valley	Wilfred Paling	40,420	79.6	1
Dewsbury	William Paling	29,341	53.6	1
Don Valley	Thomas Williams	39,789	74.0	1
Durham	Charles Grey	36,024	68.1	1
Ebbw Vale	Aneurin Bevan	28,245	80.7	1
Gower	David Grenfell	32,564	76.1	1
Hamilton	Tom Fraser	29,292	70.0	1
Hemsworth	Horace Holmes	47,934	82.4	1
Houghton-le-Spring	Billy Blyton	36,044	77.1	1
Ince	Tom Brown	32,145	71.8	1
Kirkcaldy Burghs	Thomas Hubbard	25,756	60.0	1
Llanelly	Jim Griffiths	39,326	70.8	1
Mansfield	Bernard Taylor	36,224	66.7	1
Merthyr Tydfil	S. O. Davies	29,120	78.9	1
Midlothian and Peebles	David Pryde	26,966	52.8	1
Morpeth	Robert Taylor	27,548	71.5	1
Neath	D. J. Williams	33,034	73.0	1
Normanton	Thomas Brooks	31,986	74.5	1
North East Derbyshire	Henry White	33,417	66.3	1
North West Durham	James Murray	31,084	69.7	1
Pontefract	George Sylvester	35,432	75.6	1
Rhondda East	William Mainwaring	26,645	75.9	1
Rhondda West	Iorwerth Thomas	27,150	82.4	1
Rother Valley	David Griffiths	42,222	76.6	1
Sedgefield	Joseph Slater	27,946	62.5	1
Wallsend	John McKay	33,790	56.4	1
Wigan	Ronald Williams	32,746	62.5	1

=== 1951 general election ===
Constituency	Candidate	Votes	%	Position
Aberdare	David Thomas	34,783	78.6	1
Barnsley	Sidney Schofield	37,523	69.7	1
Bedwellty	Harold Finch	31,582	83.3	1
Blaydon	William Whiteley	28,337	68.2	1
Bolsover	Harold Neal	33,661	79.9	1
Bothwell	John Timmons	26,529	56.3	1
Caerphilly	Ness Edwards	30,523	77.2	1
Chester-le-Street	Patrick Bartley	35,511	77.0	1
Consett	James Glanville	35,705	69.2	1
Dearne Valley	Wilfred Paling	39,782	79.6	1
Dewsbury	William Paling	28,650	53.3	1
Don Valley	Thomas Williams	39,687	74.1	1
Durham	Charles Grey	35,597	67.1	1
Ebbw Vale	Aneurin Bevan	28,283	80.7	1
Gower	David Grenfell	32,661	75.9	1
Hamilton	Tom Fraser	28,591	68.7	1
Hemsworth	Horace Holmes	47,402	82.7	1
Houghton-le-Spring	Billy Blyton	37,718	75.8	1
Ince	Tom Brown	32,148	72.3	1
Kirkcaldy Burghs	Thomas Hubbard	26,885	60.6	1
Llanelly	Jim Griffiths	39,731	72.5	1
Mansfield	Bernard Taylor	37,097	69.9	1
Merthyr Tydfil	S. O. Davies	28,841	79.6	1
Midlothian and Peebles	David Pryde	29,271	55.3	1
Morpeth	Robert Taylor	27,718	71.9	1
Neath	D. J. Williams	34,496	76.9	1
Normanton	Albert Roberts	31,052	73.5	1
North East Derbyshire	Henry White	33,376	66.7	1
North West Durham	James Murray	30,417	68.7	1
Pontefract	George Sylvester	35,280	76.2	1
Rhondda East	William Mainwaring	27,958	81.2	1
Rhondda West	Iorwerth Thomas	26,123	81.1	1
Rother Valley	David Griffiths	41,990	75.7	1
Sedgefield	Joseph Slater	28,219	62.3	1
Wallsend	John McKay	35,678	58.7	1
Wells	David Llewellyn	21,481	44.8	2
Wigan	Ronald Williams	34,530	66.9	1

=== By-elections, 1951–1955 ===
By-election	Candidate	Votes	%	Position
1953 Barnsley by-election	Roy Mason	29,283	72.9	1

=== 1955 general election ===
Constituency	Candidate	Votes	%	Position
Barnsley	Roy Mason	39,485	72.8	1
Bedwellty	Harold Finch	30,104	82.4	1
Blaydon	William Whiteley	25,273	66.5	1
Bolsover	Harold Neal	30,074	78.9	1
Bothwell	John Timmons	23,365	54.2	1
Caerphilly	Ness Edwards	27,852	75.2	1
Chester-le-Street	Patrick Bartley	32,323	76.3	1
Consett	William Stones	30,979	67.1	1
Dearne Valley	Wilfred Paling	36,718	77.9	1
Dewsbury	William Paling	23,286	52.1	1
Don Valley	Thomas Williams	38,433	73.7	1
Durham	Charles Grey	32,412	66.1	1
Ebbw Vale	Aneurin Bevan	26,058	79.3	1
Gower	David Grenfell	26,304	68.3	1
Hamilton	Tom Fraser	26,187	67.4	1
Hemsworth	Horace Holmes	42,603	83.3	1
Houghton-le-Spring	Billy Blyton	33,375	76.1	1
Ince	Tom Brown	29,830	72.7	1
Kirkcaldy Burghs	Thomas Hubbard	23,861	59.3	1
Llanelly	Jim Griffiths	34,021	66.6	1
Mansfield	Bernard Taylor	29,543	68.5	1
Merthyr Tydfil	S. O. Davies	25,630	77.3	1
Midlothian	David Pryde	25,994	60.2	1
Neath	D. J. Williams	30,581	76.4	1
Normanton	Albert Roberts	27,846	73.5	1
North East Derbyshire	Henry White	34,965	66.5	1
North Somerset	David Llewellyn	22,802	45.8	2
North West Durham	William Ainsley	27,116	67.4	1
Pontefract	George Sylvester	32,646	76.2	1
Rhondda East	William Mainwaring	21,859	72.6	1
Rhondda West	Iorwerth Thomas	21,288	73.8	1
Rother Valley	David Griffiths	39,968	75.6	1
Sedgefield	Joseph Slater	37,221	59.7	1
Wallsend	John McKay	34,625	57.8	1
Wigan	Ronald Williams	29,755	64.4	1

=== By-elections, 1955–1959 ===
By-election	Candidate	Votes	%	Position
1956 Blaydon by-election	Robert Woof	18,791	69.9	1
1956 Chester-le-Street by-election	Norman Pentland	27,912	80.8	1
1958 Wigan by-election	Alan Fitch	27,415	71.0	1

=== 1959 general election ===
Constituency	Candidate	Votes	%	Position
Barnsley	Roy Mason	42,565	73.7	1
Bedwellty	Harold Finch	30,697	81.8	1
Blaydon	Robert Woof	25,969	65.4	1
Bolsover	Harold Neal	32,536	78.2	1
Bothwell	John Timmons	25,119	54.7	1
Caerphilly	Ness Edwards	28,154	72.7	1
Chester-le-Street	Norman Pentland	33,901	75.8	1
Consett	William Stones	32,307	66.8	1
Dearne Valley	Edwin Wainwright	39,088	77.7	1
Don Valley	Richard Kelley	40,935	70.9	1
Durham	Charles Grey	33,795	66.4	1
Ebbw Vale	Aneurin Bevan	27,326	81.0	1
Hamilton	Tom Fraser	27,423	66.1	1
Hemsworth	Alan Beaney	45,153	82.2	1
Houghton-le-Spring	Billy Blyton	35,960	75.9	1
Ince	Tom Brown	30,752	72.3	1
Llanelly	Jim Griffiths	34,625	66.7	1
Mansfield	Bernard Taylor	31,066	67.9	1
Merthyr Tydfil	S. O. Davies	26,608	77.1	1
Midlothian	James Hill	28,457	60.2	1
Neath	D. J. Williams	30,469	71.4	1
Normanton	Albert Roberts	29,672	72.7	1
North East Derbyshire	Thomas Swain	37,444	62.9	1
North West Durham	William Ainsley	28,064	68.1	1
Pontefract	George Sylvester	35,194	76.4	1
Rhondda East	Elfed Davies	20,565	65.2	1
Rhondda West	Iorwerth Thomas	21,130	72.0	1
Rother Valley	David Griffiths	43,962	74.1	1
Sedgefield	Joseph Slater	30,642	58.5	1
Wallsend	John McKay	37,862	56.6	1
Wigan	Alan Fitch	30,664	66.3	1

=== By-elections, 1959–1964 ===
By-election	Candidate	Votes	%	Position
1962 Pontefract by-election	Joseph Harper	26,461	77.3	1

=== 1964 general election ===
Constituency	Candidate	Votes	%	Position
Ayr	Alex Eadie	18,346	47.8	2
Barnsley	Roy Mason	37,250	66.8	1
Bedwellty	Harold Finch	29,425	83.5	1
Blaydon	Robert Woof	25,926	66.7	1
Bolsover	Harold Neal	31,234	79.3	1
Caerphilly	Ness Edwards	26,001	72.1	1
Chesterfield	Eric Varley	29,452	56.5	1
Chester-le-Street	Norman Pentland	32,895	75.2	1
Consett	William Stones	29,676	68.1	1
Dearne Valley	Edwin Wainwright	38,101	80.7	1
Don Valley	Richard Kelley	42,452	71.9	1
Dunfermline Burghs	Adam Hunter	22,468	61.6	1
Durham	Charles Grey	32,818	68.3	1
Hamilton	Tom Fraser	28,964	71.0	1
Hemsworth	Alan Beaney	42,528	83.1	1
Ince	Michael McGuire	31,042	72.0	1
Liverpool West Derby	Eric Ogden	21,134	54.7	1
Llanelly	Jim Griffiths	32,546	65.9	1
Mansfield	Bernard Taylor	29,055	63.6	1
Merthyr Tydfil	S. O. Davies	23,275	75.3	1
Midlothian	James Hill	29,820	61.3	1
Normanton	Albert Roberts	28,477	72.5	1
North East Derbyshire	Thomas Swain	38,657	64.2	1
Pontefract	Joseph Harper	32,357	76.2	1
Rhondda East	Elfed Davies	20,510	71.2	1
Rhondda West	Iorwerth Thomas	20,713	79.3	1
Rother Valley	David Griffiths	43,101	74.4	1
Sedgefield	Joseph Slater	32,273	60.7	1
Wigan	Alan Fitch	28,640	69.4	1

=== By-elections, 1964–1966 ===
By-election	Candidate	Votes	%	Position
1965 Abertillery by-election	Clifford Williams	18,256	79.0	1

=== 1966 general election ===
Constituency	Candidate	Votes	%	Position
Abertillery	Clifford Williams	23,353	88.1	1
Barnsley	Roy Mason	38,744	75.7	1
Bedwellty	Harold Finch	29,723	86.3	1
Berwick-upon-Tweed	James W. Conway	9,908	33.0	2
Blaydon	Robert Woof	26,629	69.2	1
Bolsover	Harold Neal	30,114	81.6	1
Caerphilly	Ness Edwards	26,330	74.3	1
Chesterfield	Eric Varley	31,542	61.6	1
Chester-le-Street	Norman Pentland	32,467	77.0	1
Dearne Valley	Edwin Wainwright	36,735	81.6	1
Don Valley	Richard Kelley	43,973	74.9	1
Dunfermline Burghs	Adam Hunter	20,709	58.4	1
Durham	Charles Grey	32,200	70.6	1
Hamilton	Tom Fraser	27,865	71.2	1
Hemsworth	Alan Beaney	41,887	85.4	1
Ince	Michael McGuire	30,915	73.6	1
Liverpool West Derby	Eric Ogden	19,988	56.9	1
Llanelly	Jim Griffiths	33,674	71.4	1
Mansfield	Don Concannon	28,849	64.2	1
Merthyr Tydfil	S. O. Davies	21,737	74.5	1
Midlothian	Alex Eadie	27,608	56.6	1
Normanton	Albert Roberts	29,416	76.4	1
North East Derbyshire	Thomas Swain	38,723	66.9	1
Pontefract	Joseph Harper	32,328	78.4	1
Rhondda East	Elfed Davies	21,567	77.4	1
Rhondda West	Iorwerth Thomas	19,060	76.1	1
Rother Valley	David Griffiths	43,634	76.8	1
Sedgefield	Joseph Slater	34,058	64.7	1
Wigan	Alan Fitch	28,754	72.9	1

=== By-elections, 1966–1970 ===
By-election	Candidate	Votes	%	Position
1967 Hamilton by-election	Alexander Wilson	16,598	41.5	2

=== 1970 general election ===
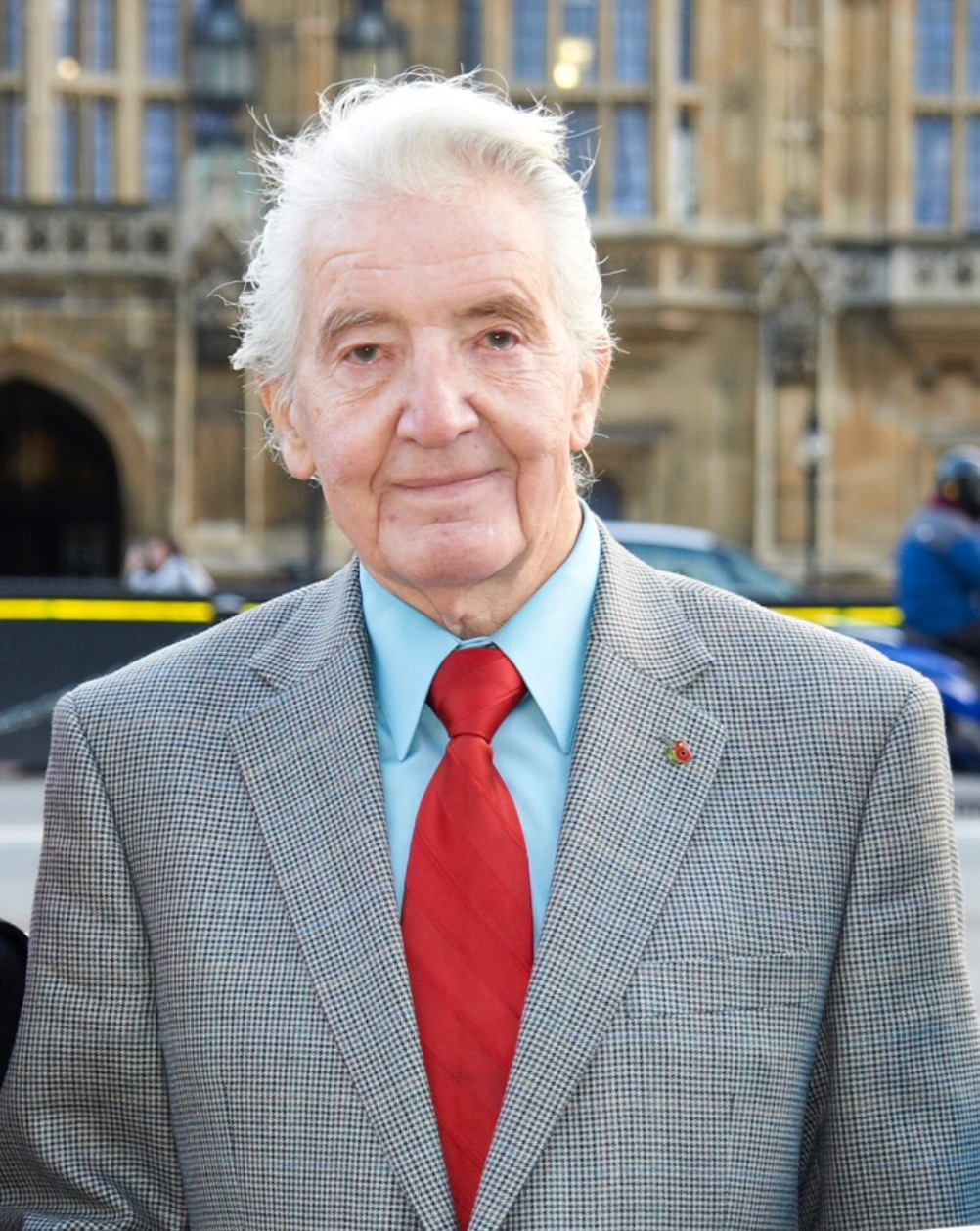
Dennis Skinner, MP from 1970

Constituency	Candidate	Votes	%	Position
Barnsley	Roy Mason	34,956	64.8	1
Blaydon	Robert Woof	25,724	64.9	1
Bolsover	Dennis Skinner	28,830	77.5	1
Carlton	Carl Bennett	27,043	40.4	2
Chesterfield	Eric Varley	30,386	59.0	1
Chester-le-Street	Norman Pentland	33,694	71.6	1
Dearne Valley	Edwin Wainwright	33,966	75.1	1
Don Valley	Richard Kelley	42,496	69.5	1
Dunfermline Burghs	Adam Hunter	21,532	57.1	1
Hamilton	Alexander Wilson	25,431	53.0	1
Hemsworth	Alan Beaney	40,013	80.8	1
Ince	Michael McGuire	32,295	68.5	1
Liverpool West Derby	Eric Ogden	22,324	57.3	1
Mansfield	Don Concannon	30,554	66.1	1
Midlothian	Alex Eadie	30,802	52.9	1
Morpeth	George Grant	21,826	60.4	1
Normanton	Albert Roberts	28,421	68.4	1
North East Derbyshire	Thomas Swain	38,181	60.9	1
Pontefract	Joseph Harper	31,774	74.8	1
Rhondda East	Elfed Davies	19,602	68.7	1
Wigan	Alan Fitch	28,102	67.5	1

=== By-elections, 1970–1974 ===
By-election	Candidate	Votes	%	Position
1972 Rochdale by-election	Lawrence Cunliffe	14,203	31.1	2

=== February 1974 general election ===
Constituency	Candidate	Votes	%	Position
Barnsley	Roy Mason	40,595	71.8	1
Blaydon	Robert Woof	22,279	58.7	1
Bolsover	Dennis Skinner	30,787	76.5	1
Cardiff North West	Charlie Blewett	10,641	29.9	2
Chesterfield	Eric Varley	31,040	54.8	1
Dearne Valley	Edwin Wainwright	34,727	68.8	1
Don Valley	Richard Kelley	48,737	70.1	1
Dunfermline	Adam Hunter	19,201	39.3	1
Hamilton	Alexander Wilson	19,070	48.0	1
Hemsworth	Alec Woodall	44,093	82.8	1
Ince	Michael McGuire	39,822	70.0	1
Liverpool West Derby	Eric Ogden	22,689	54.7	1
Mansfield	Don Concannon	34,378	64.5	1
Midlothian	Alex Eadie	32,220	44.7	1
Morpeth	George Grant	22,026	56.4	1
Normanton	Albert Roberts	29,621	67.2	1
North East Derbyshire	Thomas Swain	29,602	57.0	1
Pontefract and Castleford	Joseph Harper	34,409	74.8	1
Rochdale	Lawrence Cunliffe	16,367	31.8	2
Rushcliffe	Michael Gallagher	12,119	22.6	2
Wigan	Alan Fitch	30,485	71.3	1

=== October 1974 general election ===
Constituency	Candidate	Votes	%	Position
Barnsley	Roy Mason	34,212	65.3	1
Berwick-upon-Tweed	G. Spain	4,768	14.0	3
Blaydon	Robert Woof	23,743	52.3	1
Bolsover	Dennis Skinner	27,275	70.6	1
Cardiff North West	Charlie Blewett	11,319	32.7	2
Chesterfield	Eric Varley	30,953	59.9	1
Dearne Valley	Edwin Wainwright	33,315	74.1	1
Don Valley	Richard Kelley	41,187	63.3	1
Dunfermline	Adam Hunter	18,470	40.1	1
Hamilton	Alexander Wilson	18,487	47.6	1
Hemsworth	Alec Woodall	37,467	76.5	1
Ince	Michael McGuire	35,453	63.5	1
Liverpool West Derby	Eric Ogden	23,964	60.5	1
Mansfield	Don Concannon	28,964	57.4	1
Midlothian	Alex Eadie	28,652	41.5	1
Morpeth	George Grant	22,696	63.8	1
Normanton	Albert Roberts	24,372	58.7	1
North East Derbyshire	Thomas Swain	25,234	49.9	1
Pontefract and Castleford	Joseph Harper	30,208	70.4	1
Wigan	Alan Fitch	27,692	65.8	1

=== 1979 general election ===
Constituency	Candidate	Votes	%	Position
Ashfield	Frank Haynes	33,116	52.8	1
Barnsley	Roy Mason	36,276	64.0	1
Bolsover	Dennis Skinner	27,495	66.6	1
Carlton	Arthur Palmer	18,989	31.4	2
Chesterfield	Eric Varley	31,049	57.4	1
Dearne Valley	Edwin Wainwright	31,783	68.8	1
Don Valley	Michael Welsh	39,603	55.6	1
Hemsworth	Alec Woodall	36,509	69.6	1
Ince	Michael McGuire	34,599	56.2	1
Leigh	Lawrence Cunliffe	27,736	54.1	1
Liverpool West Derby	Eric Ogden	22,576	55.5	1
Mansfield	Don Concannon	29,051	52.3	1
Midlothian	Alex Eadie	37,773	47.8	1
Morpeth	George Grant	21,744	56.3	1
North East Derbyshire	Raymond Ellis	27,218	48.1	1
Normanton	Albert Roberts	26,591	56.4	1
Rushcliffe	Clive Atkins	11,712	21.3	2
Wigan	Alan Fitch	26,144	59.8	1

=== 1983 general election ===
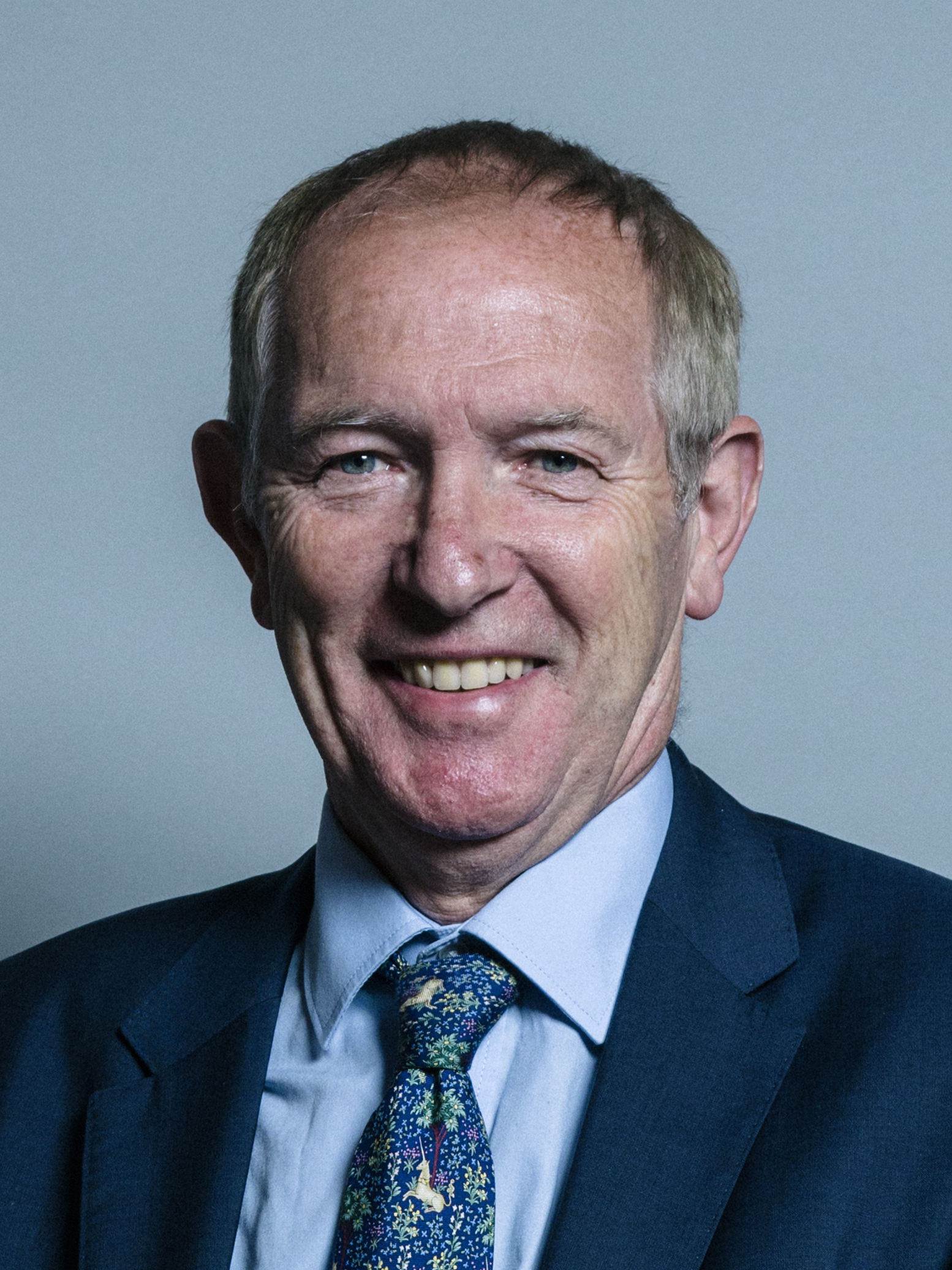
Kevin Barron, MP from 1983

Constituency	Candidate	Votes	%	Position
Ashfield	Frank Haynes	21,859	41.7	1
Barnsley Central	Roy Mason	21,847	59.8	1
Barnsley East	Terry Patchett	23,905	66.3	1
Bolsover	Dennis Skinner	26,514	56.3	1
Chesterfield	Eric Varley	23,881	48.1	1
Doncaster North	Michael Welsh	26,626	52.8	1
Don Valley	Martin Redmond	23,036	45.1	1
Hemsworth	Alec Woodall	22,081	59.3	1
Leigh	Lawrence Cunliffe	25,477	51.2	1
Mansfield	Don Concannon	18,670	40.5	1
Makerfield	Michael McGuire	25,114	49.3	1
Midlothian	Alex Eadie	19,401	42.7	1
North East Derbyshire	Raymond Ellis	21,094	40.8	1
Rother Valley	Kevin Barron	21,781	46.5	1
Wansbeck	Jack Thompson	21,732	47.0	1

=== 1987 general election ===
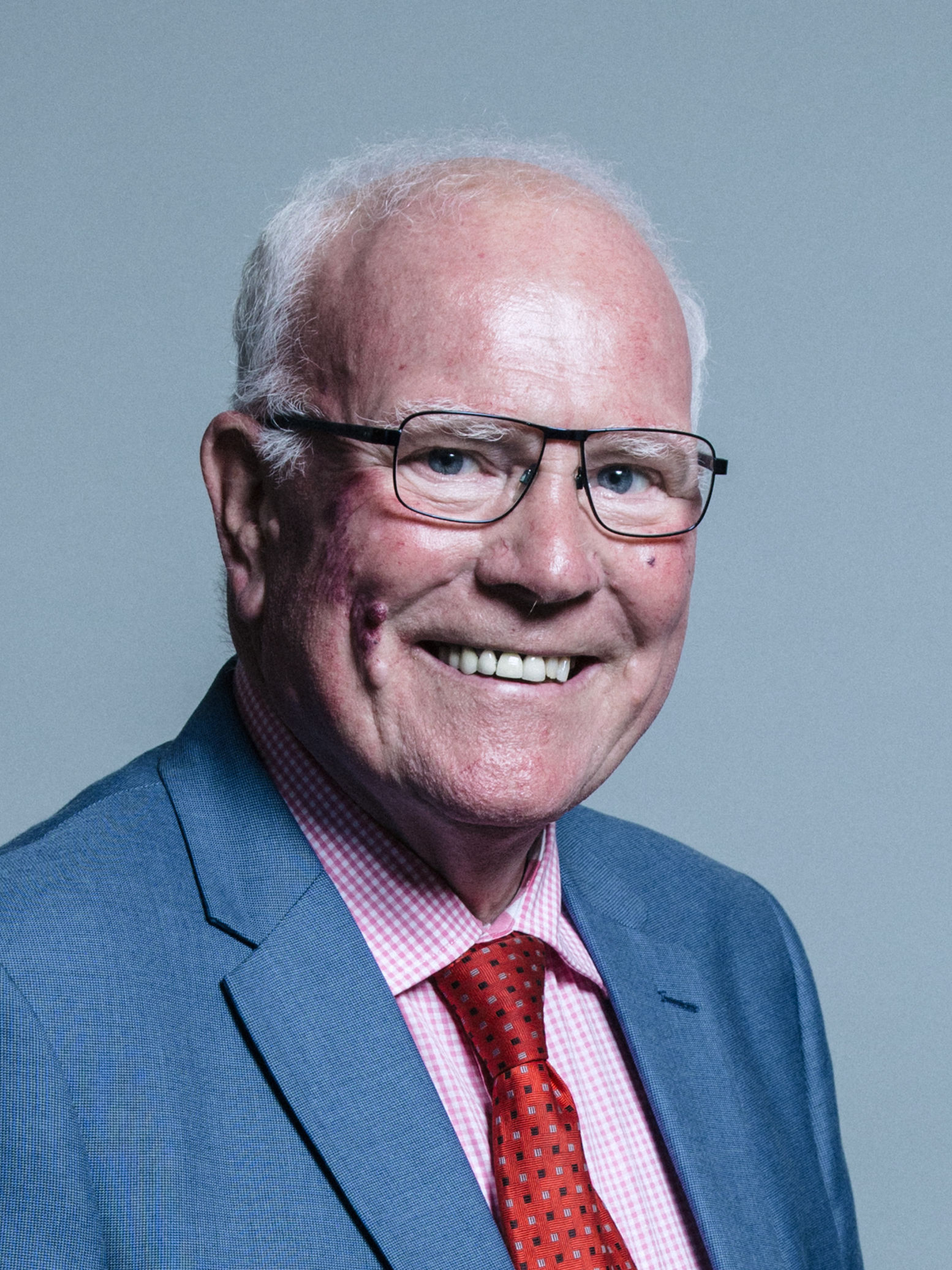
Ronnie Campbell, MP from 1987

Constituency	Candidate	Votes	%	Position
Barnsley Central	Eric Illsley	26,139	66.8	1
Barnsley East	Terry Patchett	29,948	74.5	1
Blyth Valley	Ronnie Campbell	19,604	42.5	1
Bolsover	Dennis Skinner	28,453	56.2	1
Clydesdale	Jimmy Hood	21,826	45.3	1
Doncaster North	Michael Welsh	32,950	61.8	1
Don Valley	Martin Redmond	29,200	53.1	1
Easington	John Cummings	32,396	68.1	1
Hemsworth	George Buckley	27,859	67.0	1
Leigh	Lawrence Cunliffe	30,064	58.6	1
Midlothian	Alex Eadie	22,553	48.3	1
Rother Valley	Kevin Barron	28,292	56.4	1
Wansbeck	Jack Thompson	28,080	57.5	1

=== 1992 general election ===
Constituency	Candidate	Votes	%	Position
Barnsley Central	Eric Illsley	27,048	69.3	1
Barnsley East	Terry Patchett	30,346	77.2	1
Barnsley West and Penistone	Michael Clapham	27,965	58.3	1
Blyth Valley	Ronnie Campbell	24,542	49.9	1
Bolsover	Dennis Skinner	33,978	64.5	1
Clydesdale	Jimmy Hood	21,418	44.6	1
Doncaster North	Kevin Hughes	34,135	61.8	1
Don Valley	Martin Redmond	32,008	55.0	1
Easington	John Cummings	34,269	72.7	1
Leigh	Lawrence Cunliffe	32,225	61.3	1
Midlothian	Eric Clarke	20,588	43.9	1
Rother Valley	Kevin Barron	30,977	60.5	1
Sunderland North	Bill Etherington	30,481	60.7	1
Wansbeck	Jack Thompson	30,046	59.7	1
