= Hemsworth by-election =

Hemsworth by-election may refer to one of four by-elections held in the British Parliamentary constituency of Hemsworth, in West Yorkshire:

- 1934 Hemsworth by-election
- 1946 Hemsworth by-election
- 1991 Hemsworth by-election
- 1996 Hemsworth by-election

See also

- Hemsworth (UK Parliament constituency)
- UK Parliament
