= John Guest (politician) =

British Labour politician

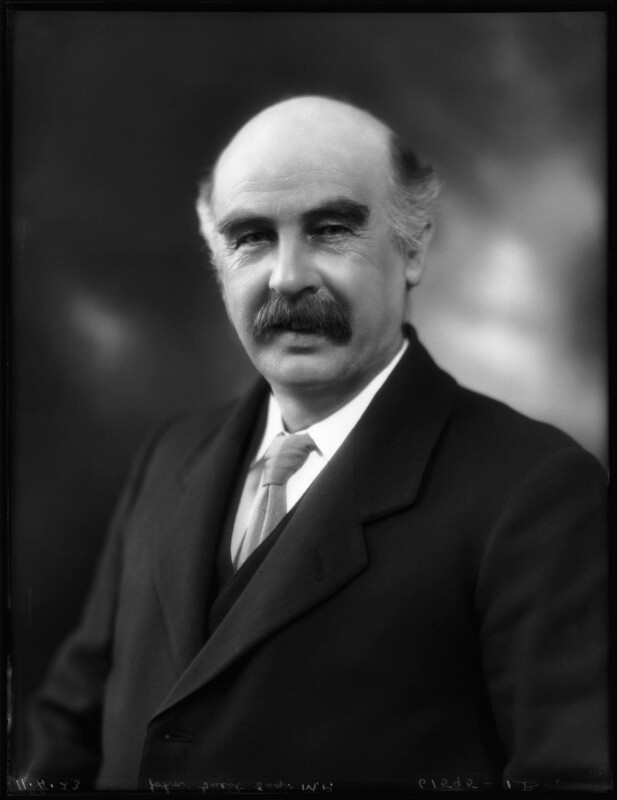
- Guest in 1923

Member of Parliament for Hemsworth
- In office 14 December 1918 – 7 October 1931
- Preceded by: Constituency established
- Succeeded by: Gabriel Price

Personal details
- Born: John Guest; 1867 The Elders, Main Street, South Hiendley
- Died: 6 October 1931 (aged 63–64) South Hiendley
- Occupation: Member of Parliament, Justice of the Peace, County Alderman, South Hiendley Parish Council founding member.

John Guest (1867 – 6 October 1931) was a British Labour Party politician.

Guest was elected at the 1918 general election as Member of Parliament for Hemsworth. He held the seat at the next four general elections, and had died shortly before the 1931 general election.

== Biography ==
Born in 1867, he lived all his life at The Elders, Main Street, South Hiendley below the Sun Inn. The Elders was passed down to his niece Miss Ada Guest who also died without issue. The Elders and the large orchard to its rear were demolished to make way for Orchard Drive housing by Hemsworth Council.

John Guest started his working life as a miner at age 14, starting at Hodroyd Colliery before moving on to South Hiendley Colliery and being selected as a delegate to the Yorkshire Miners Association at the age of 18.

He made his way up to Vice President of the Association in 1906, giving up the position in 1918 after being elected as Labour MP for Hemsworth.

His majority on his first election was less than 2,000, whereas on the final election shortly before his death his majority stood at 20,000. He focused on the welfare and safety of the working class, specifically miners.

He made 131 contributions to the House of Commons up until 1928 when his health deteriorated. His first contribution was with regards to Coal Output and his last to Gas Carbon Monoxide poisoning.

He was a Wesleyan Methodist, Justice of the Peace, County Alderman and member of South Hiendley Parish Council since its inception in 1894.

He was betrothed to a lady by the name of Ann Lambert but she was to die before they could marry so he lived with his older sister Rachel and her daughter Ada.

== Death ==
Due to differences with his family, John Guest was buried in an unmarked grave in St. Peters church in Felkirk, near South Hiendley. Seventy-five years later his great-nephew John Graham Guest added a plaque to mark his grave accompanied by then present Hemsworth MP, Jon Trickett.

Trade union offices
Preceded by Herbert Smith	Vice-President of the Yorkshire Miners' Association; 1906–1918	Succeeded by Edward Hough
Parliament of the United Kingdom
New constituency	Member of Parliament for Hemsworth; 1918–1931	Succeeded by Gabriel Price
