= Horace Holmes =

Sir Horace Holmes DCM
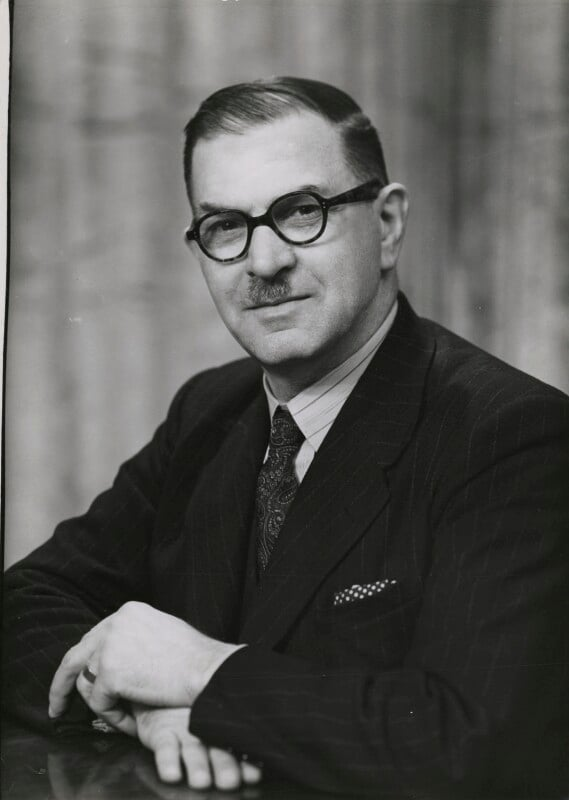
- Holmes in 1949

Member of Parliament for Hemsworth
- In office 22 February 1946 – 18 September 1959
- Preceded by: George Griffiths
- Succeeded by: Alan Beaney

Personal details
- Born: Horace Edwin Holmes; 30 March 1888 Weston, Nottinghamshire, England
- Died: 9 September 1971 (aged 83) Buckrose, Yorkshire, England
- Party: Labour

Sir Horace Edwin Holmes DCM (30 March 1888 – 9 September 1971) was a British Labour Party politician and trade union official.

Born in Royston, South Yorkshire, Holmes received an elementary education before becoming a coal miner. During World War I, he served as a sergeant in the Leeds Rifles, and received the Distinguished Conduct Medal. After the war, he returned to mining, and from 1923 was secretary of his branch of the Yorkshire Miners' Association. From 1923 until 1946, he also served on Royston Urban District Council, and for eleven years, he additionally served on the West Riding County Council.

Sponsored by his union, Holmes was elected unopposed as Member of Parliament for Hemsworth at a by-election in 1946 following the death of the sitting MP George Griffiths. Holmes held the seat at the next three general elections, each time with the largest Labour majority in the election. From 1947 until 1951, he was Parliamentary Private Secretary to the successive Ministers of Fuel and Power, Hugh Gaitskell and Philip Noel-Baker. He then became the Labour Whip for the Yorkshire members.

Holmes stood down at the 1959 general election. He was knighted in 1966, and died in 1971.

Parliament of the United Kingdom
Preceded by George Griffiths	Member of Parliament for Hemsworth; 1946–1959	Succeeded by Alan Beaney
