= Derek Enright =

British politician (1935–1995)

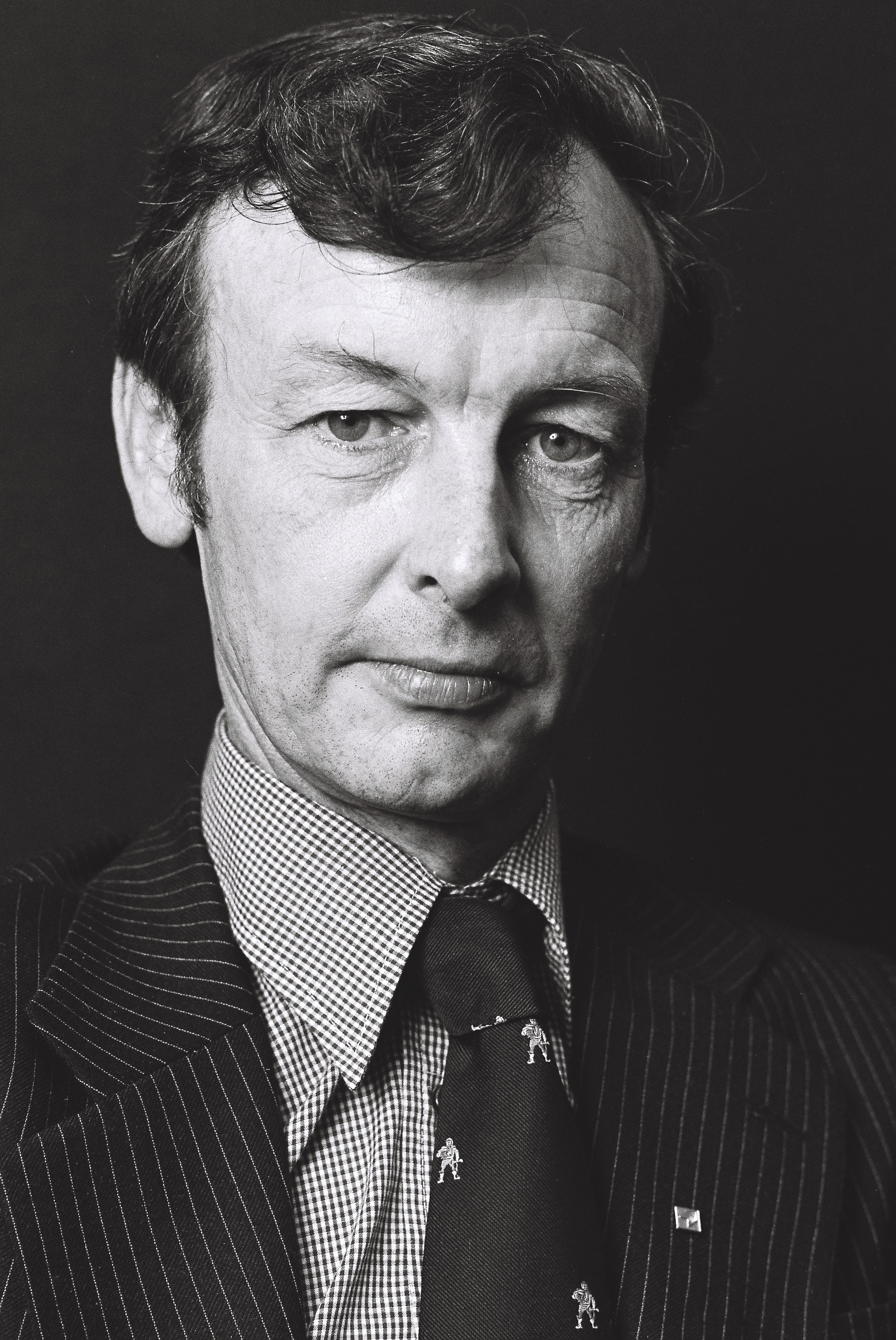

Member of Parliament for Hemsworth
- In office 7 November 1991 – 31 October 1995
- Preceded by: George Buckley
- Succeeded by: Jon Trickett

Member of the European Parliament for Leeds
- In office 10 June 1979 – 17 June 1984
- Succeeded by: Michael McGowan

Personal details
- Born: 2 August 1935 Thornaby-on-Tees, England
- Died: 31 October 1995 (aged 60) London, England
- Party: Labour
- Spouse: Jane Simmons (m. 1963)
- Children: 4
- Education: Wadham College, Oxford

Derek Anthony Enright (2 August 1935 – 31 October 1995) was a British Labour Party politician. He was a Member of the European Parliament from 1979 to 1984, and the MP for Hemsworth from 1991 until his death.

== Early life ==
Born in Thornaby-on-Tees, North Riding of Yorkshire, he attended St. Michael's College on St John's Road, Leeds (which has since merged with Mount St Mary's Catholic High School), then a grammar school.

He was educated at Wadham College, Oxford, gaining a BA in Classics and a DipEd, and worked as a school teacher of classics at The John Fisher School, a Roman Catholic grammar school in Purley, Surrey, from 1959 to 1967. He taught at St Wilfrid's Catholic High School in the 1970s, where he taught students to sing "Yellow Submarine" and "Ten Green Bottles" in Latin.

== Parliamentary career ==
He was elected as a Labour Member of the European Parliament (MEP) for Leeds in 1979, staying until 1984. He was British Labour group spokesman on third world affairs and women's rights, and was later an EC delegate in Guinea Bissau. He contested Kent East in the 1984 European election. He became Member of Parliament (MP) for Hemsworth, West Yorkshire at a 1991 by-election. A devout Catholic, he co-founded, in 1990, the cross-party Movement for Christian Democracy, portions of which later evolved into the Christian Peoples Alliance. He was a strong supporter European integration and the Social Chapter.

On 2 March 1993, during a debate on the Education Reform Bill, Enright mentioned that "To help my pupils discover what the optative and subjunctive are all about, I translated Beatles songs into Latin." Challenged by Nicholas Fairbairn to sing a Beatles song in Latin, Enright immediately stood up and did so, singing "Yellow Submarine" in Latin - "Habitamus sub vitreo, sub vitreo, sub vitreo". The Deputy Speaker, Geoffrey Lofthouse, got him to curtail his performance by reminding Enright of the rules of the House: "Order. The hon. Gentleman has been a Member of the House long enough to know its rules full well."

== Personal life ==
He married Jane Simmons in 1963, and they had two sons and two daughters. His son, Duncan Enright, stood against Michael Heseltine in Henley at the 1997 general election, and against David Cameron in Witney at the 2015 general election. Duncan is a councillor in Witney, Oxfordshire.

Enright died from cancer in London on 31 October 1995, at the age of 60.

European Parliament
New title	Member of the European Parliament for Leeds; 1979 – 1984	Succeeded by Michael McGowan
Parliament of the United Kingdom
Preceded by George Buckley	Member of Parliament for Hemsworth; 1991 – 1995	Succeeded by Jon Trickett
