= 1991 Hemsworth by-election =

UK parliamentary by-election

← 1987	7 November 1991	1992 →

Constituency of Hemsworth
- Turnout: 42.6% (▼33.1%)
	First party	Second party	Third party
Candidate	Derek Enright	Valerie Megson	Garnett Harrison
Party	Labour	Liberal Democrats	Conservative
Popular vote	15,895	4,808	2,512
Percentage	66.3%	20.1%	10.5%
Swing	▼0.7%	▲4.3%	▼6.7%
MP before election
George Buckley
Labour
Subsequent MP
Derek Enright
Labour

The 1991 Hemsworth by-election was a parliamentary by-election held in England on 7 November 1991 for the UK House of Commons constituency of Hemsworth in West Yorkshire. The seat had become vacant upon the death on 14 September of the Labour Member of Parliament George Buckley, who had held the seat since the 1987 general election.

The Labour candidate, Derek Enright, held the seat for his party.

== Result ==
Hemsworth by-election, 1991
Party	Candidate	Votes	%	±%
Labour	Derek Enright	15,895	66.3	−0.7
Liberal Democrats	Valerie Megson	4,808	20.1	+4.3
Conservative	Garnett Harrison	2,512	10.5	−6.7
Independent Labour	Paul Ablett	648	2.7	N/A
Corrective Party	Timothy Smith	108	0.5	N/A
Majority		11,097	46.2	−3.6
Turnout		23,971		
Labour hold		Swing	+3.0	

== Previous result ==
General election 1987: Hemsworth
Party	Candidate	Votes	%	±%
Labour	George Buckley	27,859	67.0	+7.7
Conservative	Edward Garnier	7,159	17.2	−2.4
Liberal	John Wooffindin	6,568	15.8	−5.4
Majority		20,700	49.8	+11.7
Turnout		41,586	75.7	+7.1
Labour hold		Swing		

== See also ==
- 1934 Hemsworth by-election
- 1946 Hemsworth by-election
- 1996 Hemsworth by-election
- List of United Kingdom by-elections
