= Isaac Burns =

British trade unionist and political activist

Isaac Burns (9 November 1869 – 7 February 1946), often known as Ike Burns, was a British trade unionist and political activist.

Born in Moor Row in Cumberland, Burns worked from the age of twelve in an iron ore mine at Yarlside, joining the Cumberland Iron Ore Miners' Association on his first day. He was one of twelve children, but after his father was injured in an accident, he became the main wage earner for his family.

The mines in Yarlside were flooded in 1891, and Burns moved to Hemsworth in Yorkshire to find work at the South Kirkby Colliery. Later in the year, he migrated to the United States, working at copper, silver and gold mines from Montana to Arizona, but he returned to Hemsworth in 1895, and joined the Yorkshire Miners' Association (YMA).

On returning to Yorkshire, Burns joined the Independent Labour Party (ILP), and during the 1897 Barnsley by-election, his cottage was the campaign headquarters for the party. In 1897, he was elected to Hemsworth Rural District Council, serving continuously until its abolition in 1922; he also served on the Hemsworth Board of Guardians from 1906. He was known for wearing a bright red tie, to symbolise his socialist views.

Burns's high political profile led him to prominence in the union; he became auditor of the South Kirkby lodge, then successively secretary, collector, and president, and from 1912 the branch delegate to the YMA Council. In the late 1900s, he was sacked for his trade union activities, but the union stood by him, and after ten months was able to get him a new role as a checkweighman at the colliery. He also served on the Yorkshire County Joint Wages Board for fifteen years.

Burns opposed World War I, an unpopular position at the time. He was selected as the Labour Party candidate in Pontefract at the 1918 United Kingdom general election, but was defeated, perhaps due to his pacifist views. He stood again, in the 1919 Pontefract by-election, increasing his vote share to 46.0%, but again failed to win election.

In 1922, Hemsworth was given an Urban District Council, and Burns was elected to it, chairing it on two occasions. He remained with the ILP after it split from the Labour Party in 1932, and the party considered standing him in the 1934 Hemsworth by-election, although it did not ultimately do so.
