= 1919 Pontefract by-election =

By-election in Pontefract, Yorkshire, England

- 6 September 1919
- Registered: 29,841
- Turnout: 61.5%
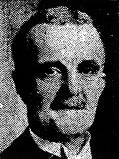
		Lab
Candidate	Walter Forrest	Isaac Burns
Party	National Liberal	Labour
Alliance	Coalition
Popular vote	9,920	8,445
Percentage	54.0%	46.0%
Swing	▼8.9%	▲8.9%
MP before election
Joseph Compton-Rickett
National Liberal
Subsequent MP
Walter Forrest
National Liberal

The 1919 Pontefract by-election was a parliamentary by-election held for the British House of Commons constituency of Pontefract in Yorkshire on 6 September 1919.

== Background ==
The by-election was caused by the death on 30 July 1919 of the sitting Coalition Liberal Member of Parliament, Sir Joseph Compton-Rickett. He was 72 years old. He had been an MP in the area since 1906 when he was elected for Osgoldcross. He had been Lloyd George's Paymaster General since 1916.

=== Electoral history ===
The Pontefract constituency had been Liberal since 1893 and Osgoldcross Liberal since 1885. At the general election in 1918, Compton-Rickett was re-elected with the support of the Coalition Government 'coupon'.

Pontefract General Election, 1918
Party		Candidate	Votes	%
C	National Liberal	Joseph Compton-Rickett	8,561	62.9
	Labour	Isaac Burns	5,047	37.1
Majority			3,514	25.8
Turnout			13,608	45.6
Registered electors			29,841	
	National Liberal win (new boundaries)			
C indicates candidate endorsed by the coalition government.

== Candidates ==
=== Coalition Liberal ===
The Coalition Liberals of Prime Minister David Lloyd George, apparently had some trouble in finding a candidate at first.

- Walter Forrest, member of West Riding County Council and woollen manufacturer from Pudsey

=== Labour ===
- Isaac Burns, nominee of the Yorkshire Miners' Association, trade unionist and candidate for this seat in 1918.

=== Conservative ===
The local Conservatives endorsed the candidacy of their Coalition partners

== Campaign ==
=== Coalition Liberal ===
Walter Forrest set out his position on a number of questions at his meetings of both the local Coalition Liberals and Unionist parties. He was opposed to the nationalisation of the coal mines and conscription, in favour of some relaxation of the liquor laws for the benefit of working men and improved welfare for men disabled in the war; he was also in favour of the full restoration of trade and commerce as soon as conditions allowed, to increase output and living standards. He also strongly advocated economy and retrenchment but one of the Liberal MPs who visited the constituency to speak for him, Dr T J Macnamara the Secretary to the Admiralty, in a speech designed to protect the position of his Department and no doubt appeal to the patriotic feelings of working class and Unionist voters, was keen to point out that national security must take precedence over economy.

=== Labour ===
The health of the coal mining industry was an issue which Isaac Burns particularly sought to make his own against the background of a coal strike taking place in the area. He was hampered by the fact that although coal mining was a major industry in the area, the principal colliery towns had been attached to other constituencies in boundary changes and mining was not necessarily decisive as there were many other interests in the constituency. Agriculture dominated around Barkston Ash and there was shipping and coastal trades around Goole. Many in these industries were adversely affected by the coal strike and were unsympathetic to Burns and Labour as a result. Burns stated he was in favour of a number of Labour policies including equal adult franchise for both sexes, pensions for mothers and free secondary education for all. He was in favour of widespread nationalisation of industry and a programme of public works to keep down unemployment. He also wanted Home Rule for Ireland and local government for India.

== Result ==
Forrest retained the seat for the government but with a reduced majority.

Pontefract by-election, 1919
Party		Candidate	Votes	%	±%
C	National Liberal	Walter Forrest	9,920	54.0	–8.9
	Labour	Isaac Burns	8,445	46.0	+8.9
Majority			1,475	8.0	–17.8
Turnout			18,365	61.5	+15.9
Registered electors			29,841		
	National Liberal hold		Swing	–8.9	
C indicates candidate endorsed by the coalition government.

== See also ==
- List of United Kingdom by-elections
- United Kingdom by-election records
