= Alan Beaney =

British politician

Alan Beaney (3 March 1905 – 3 March 1985) was a British Labour Party politician.

Born in New Silksworth in County Durham, Beaney received an elementary education before becoming a coal miner in Yorkshire. He joined the Labour Party, and served on Dearne Urban District Council from 1938 to 1952, and then the West Riding of Yorkshire County Council from 1949 to 1952, and again from 1958 to 1959. The Yorkshire Miners' Association funded his study with the National Council of Labour Colleges, and he later served on its executive committee.

Beaney was elected at the 1959 general election as Member of Parliament for Hemsworth. He held the seat at the next three general elections, and stood down at the February 1974 general election.

Parliament of the United Kingdom
Preceded by Horace Holmes	Member of Parliament for Hemsworth; 1959–February 1974	Succeeded by Alec Woodall
