= George Griffiths (British politician) =

British politician

George Arthur Griffiths (7 May 1880 – 15 December 1945) was a British Labour Party politician.

He was elected unopposed as Member of Parliament (MP) for Hemsworth at a by-election in 1934 following the death of the sitting MP Gabriel Price of South Elmsall. Mr Absalom Flavell, of South Kirkby, had been recommended by a number of affiliated bodies for selection as prospective Labour candidate, but he voluntarily withdrew in favour of Mr Griffiths, who had a stronger backing, having been secretary and organiser of the Hemsworth Divisional Labour Party since 1917 when the constituency was created.. Griffiths held the seat at the next two general elections, and died in office in 1945.

He was born in North Wales and started work in a coal mine when 13 years of age and was to move to Royston in 1903 where he was employed at the Monckton Colliery to progress to checkweighman. He became delegate for the Monckton Colliery branch to the Yorkshire Miners' Association in 1911 and was also a representative of the Barnsley area on the Miners' Welfare Committee. He also had a long record of public service as a member of the Royston Urban District and Council, being chairman several times. He was also a member of the West Riding County Council and served on the Public Health committee, Highways committee, Law and Parliamentary committee, Public Assistance Committee and the West Riding Rivers Board.

Parliament of the United Kingdom
Preceded by Gabriel Price	Member of Parliament for Hemsworth; 1934–1946	Succeeded by Horace Holmes
