= Jon Trickett =

British Labour politician (born 1950)

Jon Trickett MP
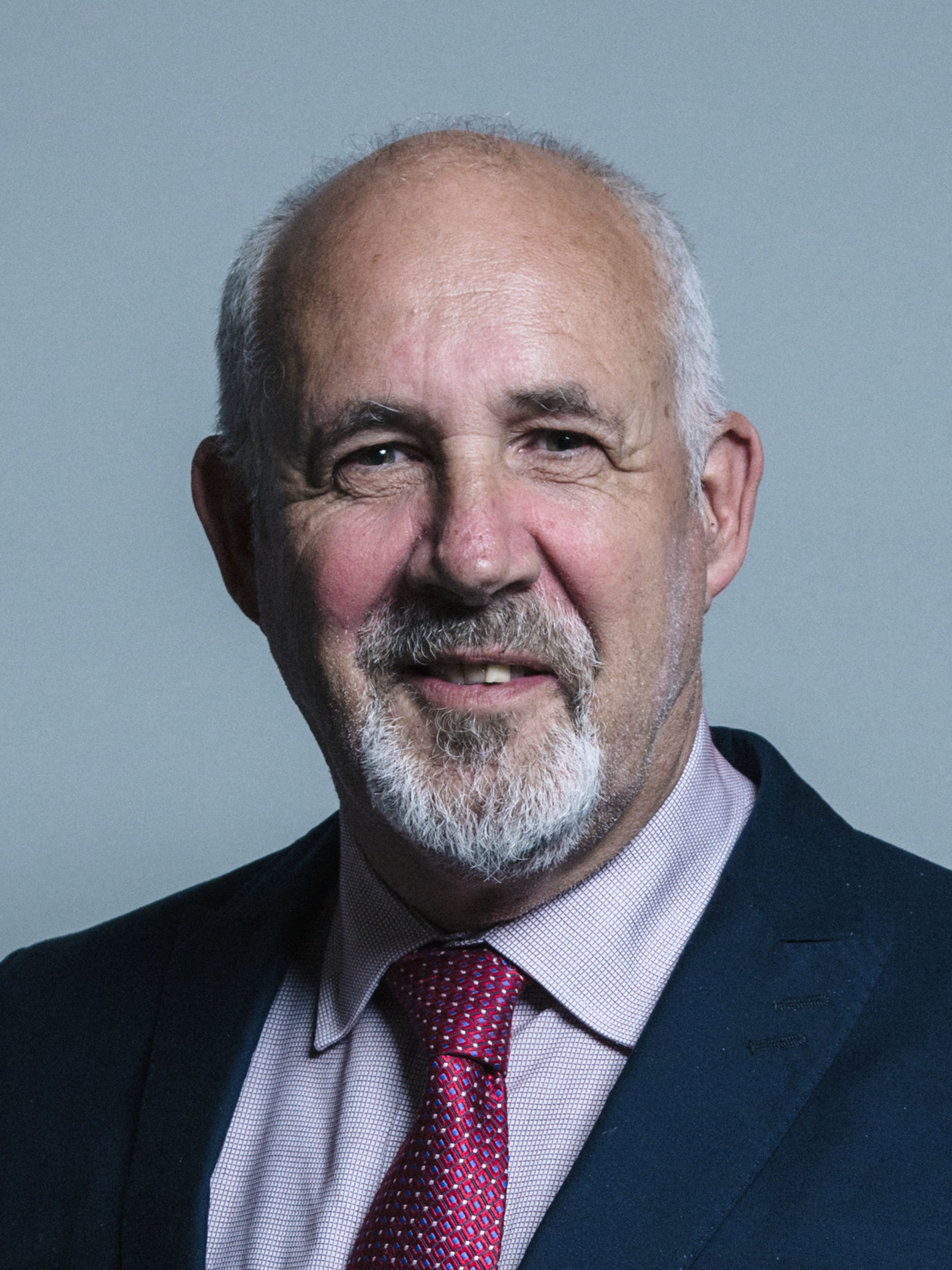
- Official portrait, 2017

Member of Parliament for Normanton and Hemsworth Hemsworth (1996–2024)
- Incumbent
- Assumed office 1 February 1996
- Preceded by: Derek Enright
- Majority: 6,662 (18.3%)

Parliamentary Private Secretary to the Prime Minister
- In office 4 October 2008 – 11 May 2010
- Prime Minister: Gordon Brown
- Preceded by: Ian Austin
- Succeeded by: Desmond Swayne
Shadow cabinet portfolios
2017–2020	Cabinet Office
2016–2020	Lord President of the Council
2016–2016	Business, Innovation and Skills
2015–2017	National Campaign Coordinator
2015–2016	Communities and Local Government
2013–2015	Without Portfolio
2011–2013	Cabinet Office

Leader of Leeds City Council
- In office 1989–1996
- Preceded by: George Mudie
- Succeeded by: Brian Walker

Member of Leeds City Council for Beeston
- In office 28 September 1984 – 1996
- Preceded by: Michael McGowan
- Succeeded by: Angela Gabriel

Personal details
- Born: Jon Hedley Trickett; 2 July 1950 (age 76) Leeds, England
- Party: Labour
- Other political affiliations: Socialist Campaign Group
- Education: University of Hull (BA); University of Leeds (MA)
- Website: Official website

Jon Hedley Trickett (born 2 July 1950) is a British Labour Party politician who has been the Member of Parliament (MP) for Normanton and Hemsworth, previously Hemsworth, since 1996. He was Shadow Lord President of the Council from 2016 to 2020 and served as Shadow Minister for the Cabinet Office from 2011 to 2013 and 2017 to 2020. He was the Labour Party National Campaign Coordinator under Jeremy Corbyn from 2015 to 2017.

Trickett served as the Parliamentary Private Secretary to Prime Minister Gordon Brown from 2008 to 2010 and was promoted to the Shadow Cabinet by Ed Miliband in 2011 as Shadow Minister for the Cabinet Office.

Trickett was appointed Shadow Secretary of State for Communities and Local Government under new Party Leader Jeremy Corbyn in September 2015, before serving as Shadow Secretary of State for Business, Innovation and Skills from July to October 2016. He was later appointed Shadow Minister for the Cabinet Office by Corbyn in February 2017, alongside his portfolio as Shadow Lord President of the Council.

Trickett is a member of the Socialist Campaign Group, a parliamentary group of Labour MPs.

== Early life and career ==
Jon Trickett was born in Leeds on 2 July 1950. He studied at Roundhay Grammar School (now called Roundhay School). He received a BA in politics from the University of Hull, and later an MA in Political Sociology from the University of Leeds.

Formed politically by the anti-Vietnam war movement, he joined the Labour Party in 1969 and was active on the Labour left in Leeds from the late 1960s. From 1974 to 1986 he worked as a builder and plumber. During the campaigns relating to the Common Market referendum in 1975 he was the secretary of the Vote No campaign in Leeds.

During the 1970s Trickett was a member of the ILP (the successor body of the Independent Labour Party), contributed to its newspaper, the Labour Leader, and was elected for a number of years to its ruling body, the National Administrative Council. Trickett was also active in anti-fascist and anti-war movements, and was a delegate to the Leeds Trades Council. Later he was the election agent for Michael McGowan who became the MEP for Leeds in 1984.

Trickett was first elected to Leeds City Council for the Beeston ward in 1984 at the age of 34. He replaced George Mudie as Leader of the Council in 1989, holding the leadership until 1996 and his election to Parliament. Brian Walker replaced Trickett as Council Leader. He resigned his council seat after the May local elections to take his seat in the House of Commons.

== Parliamentary career ==
=== Blair and Brown governments ===
At the 1996 Hemsworth by-election, Trickett was elected to Parliament as MP for Hemsworth with 71.9% of the vote and a majority of 13,875. He was re-elected as MP for Hemsworth at the 1997 general election with a decreased vote share of 70.6% and an increased majority of 23,992.

Following the general election, Trickett was made a parliamentary private secretary (PPS) to Peter Mandelson and worked in the Cabinet office and subsequently the Department of Trade and Industry (DTI). After leaving the government at the time of Mandelson's fall from grace, Trickett was chair of the Compass pressure group.

At the 2001 general election, Trickett was again re-elected, with a decreased vote share of 65.4% and a decreased majority of 15,636.

He played a significant role in rebelling against the Iraq War and participated in demonstrations against it in London, Wakefield, and Leeds. He rebelled on a number of occasions against Tony Blair's reforms to public services. He led the demands for a recall of parliament at the time of the Israeli attacks on the Lebanon, and the campaign inside the Commons to amend the Companies Bill to secure public listed companies reporting on 'supply chain issues' in line with the suggestions of a range of non governmental organisations.

At the 2005 general election, Trickett was again re-elected with a decreased vote share of 58.8% and a decreased majority of 13,481.

Trickett had previously voted against the Blair Government's 90-day detention proposals in the Terrorism Act 2006, which had been publicly advocated by the police, and was joined by both Labour and Conservative MPs in the vote, the only time Blair was defeated in the Commons. Trickett and Cruddas voted in favour of the subsequent 28-day detention proposal, and Trickett then resigned from his position in Compass after voting in favour of the legislation despite opposition to the Bill from some members of Compass.

In June 2007 he was asked by Gordon Brown to chair the party's manifesto group on housing, a position which he declined to take up. Following the cabinet reshuffle of 3 October 2008, Trickett became the Parliamentary private secretary to the Prime Minister, Gordon Brown.

=== In opposition ===
At the 2010 general election, Trickett was again re-elected with a decreased vote share of 46.8% and a decreased majority of 9,844.

On 7 October 2011, Trickett was appointed to the Shadow Cabinet as Shadow Minister for the Cabinet Office by Labour Leader Ed Miliband. He was re-elected to the House of Commons at the 2015 general election with a majority of 12,078.

At the 2015 general election, Trickett was again re-elected, with an increased vote share of 51.3% and an increased majority of 12,078.

Trickett was one of 36 Labour MPs to nominate Jeremy Corbyn as a candidate in the Labour leadership election of 2015.

In February 2016, a former British National Party candidate was convicted of making an anti-semitic verbal attack upon Trickett.

On 27 June 2016 Trickett was appointed as Shadow Lord President of the Council and Campaigns and Elections Director. Later that year, Trickett was appointed Shadow Secretary of State for Business, Innovation and Skills.

In July 2016, Trickett apologised for comments on Twitter which appeared to liken an attempted coup in Turkey to attempts to oust Jeremy Corbyn. Trickett deleted the relevant tweet and apologised, saying: "Okay okay. Tweet deleted and withdrawn. Shouldn't tweet when feeling ill. I apologise sincerely".

At the snap 2017 general election, Trickett was again re-elected, with an increased vote share of 56% and a decreased majority of 10,174. He was again re-elected at the 2019 general election, with a decreased vote share of 37.5% and a decreased majority of 1,180.

On 5 April 2020, following the election of Keir Starmer as Leader of the Labour Party, Trickett was asked to stand down from his frontbench roles. He had backed Rebecca Long-Bailey for the party leadership.

Due to the 2023 review of Westminster constituencies, Trickett's constituency of Hemsworth was abolished, and replaced with Normanton and Hemsworth. At the 2024 general election, Trickett was elected to Parliament as MP for Normanton and Hemsworth with 47.5% of the vote and a majority of 6,662.

=== Starmer government ===
In September 2024, Trickett was the only MP from the Labour Party to vote for a parliamentary motion which would block the Labour government's plan to means test the Winter Fuel Payment for pensioners, becoming part of the significant backlash to it, arguing that this reform would lead to a further increase in poverty among pensioners during the coming winter, which he warned would be "extremely difficult for my constituents of all ages". Trickett had supported the introduction of the payment as a universal benefit to pensioners, by Labour chancellor Gordon Brown in 1997.

== Personal life ==
Trickett married Sarah Balfour on 31 October 1993. They have three children.

Parliament of the United Kingdom
Preceded by Derek Enright	Member of Parliament for Hemsworth; 1996–2024	Constituency abolished
New constituency	Member of Parliament for Normanton and Hemsworth; 2024–present	Incumbent
Political offices
Preceded by Ian Austin	Parliamentary Private Secretary to the Prime Minister; 2008–2010	Succeeded by Desmond Swayne
Preceded by Tessa Jowell	Shadow Minister for the Cabinet Office; 2011–2013	Succeeded by Michael Dugher
Preceded by Michael Dugher	Shadow Minister without Portfolio; 2013–2015	Succeeded by Jon Ashworth
Preceded by Emma Reynolds	Shadow Secretary of State for Communities and Local Government; 2015–2016	Succeeded by Grahame Morris
New office	Shadow Minister for the Constitutional Convention; 2015–2016	Succeeded by Grahame Morris
Preceded by Angela Eagle	Shadow Secretary of State for Business, Innovation and Skills; 2016	Succeeded by Clive Lewis
New office	Shadow Lord President of the Council; 2016–2020	Office abolished
Preceded by Ian Lavery	Shadow Minister for the Cabinet Office; 2017–2020	Succeeded by Rachel Reeves
