= Gabriel Price =

British Labour MP (1870-1934)

Member of Parliament for Hemsworth
- In office 1931–1934

Personal details
- Born: 19 April 1879
- Died: 24 March 1934 (aged 54)

Gabriel Price (19 April 1879 – 24 March 1934) was a British Labour Party politician.

== Early life ==
Born in Fairburn, West Riding of Yorkshire, Price followed his father into coalmining, beginning work at the Hemsworth Colliery when he was 12 years old, later becoming a checkweighman at Frickley Colliery. He was also active in the Yorkshire Miners' Association, serving on its council.

== Political career ==
Price was elected to the Hemsworth Board of Guardians and Rural District Councils in 1913, becoming chair of the RDC in 1919. That year, he was also elected to the West Riding County Council, then he became an alderman on it in 1922. In 1921, he became a magistrate, and was also chair of the Sheffield Board of Governors.

Price was elected as Member of Parliament for Hemsworth at the 1931 general election, and died in office in 1934, when he committed suicide by drowning.

Price was the uncle of horse-racing owner-breeder and publisher, Phil Bull.

Parliament of the United Kingdom
Preceded by John Guest	Member of Parliament for Hemsworth; 1931–1934	Succeeded by George Griffiths
