= 1996 Hemsworth by-election =

UK parliamentary by-election

- 1 February 1996
- Turnout: 39.5% (▼36.4 pp)
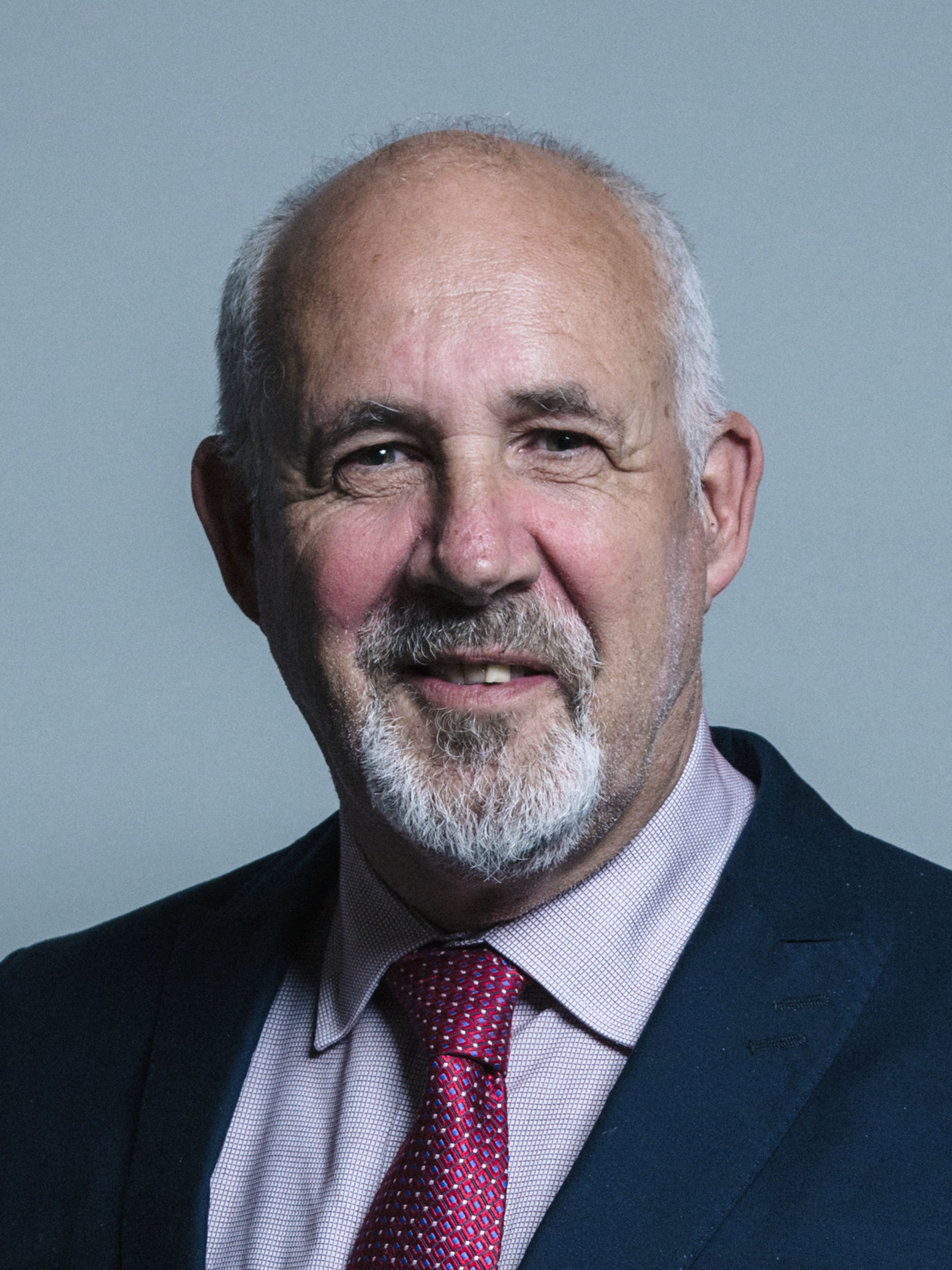
	First party	Second party
Candidate	Jon Trickett	Norman Hazell
Party	Labour	Conservative
Popular vote	15,817	1,942
Percentage	71.9%	8.8%
Swing	▲1.1pp	▼9.8pp
	Third party	Fourth party
Candidate	John Ridgeway	Brenda Nixon
Party	Liberal Democrats	Socialist Labour
Popular vote	1,516	1,193
Percentage	6.9%	5.4%
Swing	▼3.7pp	New
MP before election
Derek Enright
Labour
Elected MP
Jon Trickett
Labour

A by-election for the United Kingdom parliamentary constituency of Hemsworth was held on 1 February 1996 following the death of incumbent Labour Party Member of Parliament (MP) Derek Enright. Jon Trickett held the seat for Labour.

Enright, who was previously Member of the European Parliament (MEP) for Leeds from 1979 to 1984, had held the seat since a by-election in 1991.

The election saw the first contest by the Socialist Labour Party, ahead of the party's official formation. Based in nearby Barnsley, the organisation saved its deposit, with 5.4% of the vote.

Hemsworth by-election, 1996
Party	Candidate	Votes	%	±%
Labour	Jon Trickett	15,817	71.9	+1.1
Conservative	Norman Hazell	1,942	8.8	–9.8
Liberal Democrats	John Ridgeway	1,516	6.9	–3.7
Socialist Labour	Brenda Nixon	1,193	5.4	New
Monster Raving Loony	David Sutch	652	3.0	New
UKIP	Peter Davies	455	2.1	New
Green	Peg Alexander	157	0.7	New
Independent	Mark Thomas	122	0.6	New
National Democrats	Mike Cooper	111	0.5	New
Natural Law	Diane Leighton	28	0.1	New
Majority		13,875	63.1	+10.9
Turnout		21,993	39.5	−36.4
Labour hold		Swing	+5.43	

== See also ==
- Lists of United Kingdom by-elections
- 1934 Hemsworth by-election
- 1946 Hemsworth by-election
- 1991 Hemsworth by-election
