= Alec Woodall =

British Labour Party politician

Alec Woodall MP

Member of Parliament for Hemsworth
- In office 28 February 1974 – 18 May 1987
- Preceded by: Alan Beaney
- Succeeded by: George Buckley

Personal details
- Born: 20 September 1918
- Died: 3 January 2011 (age 92)
- Party: Labour

Alec Woodall (20 September 1918 – 3 January 2011) was a British Labour Party politician.

Woodall was the Member of Parliament (MP) for Hemsworth from 1974 until 1987, when he was deselected as Labour candidate and replaced by George Buckley who described him as being from "traditional mining stock" in his maiden speech.

Before entering Parliament, Woodall served as an infantryman.

== Political views ==
Woodall supported a range of political causes during his time in the House of Commons, including more transparency in political funding in the United Kingdom.

Parliament of the United Kingdom
Preceded by Alan Beaney	Member of Parliament for Hemsworth; February 1974 – 1987	Succeeded by George Buckley
