= 1934 Hemsworth by-election =

UK parliamentary by-election

A by-election was held for the British House of Commons constituency of Hemsworth on 17 May 1934. The seat had become vacant on the death of the Labour Member of Parliament Gabriel Price, who had held the seat since the 1931 general election.

The Labour Party considered two candidates: Absalom Flavell, from South Kirkby, and George Griffiths, secretary and organiser of the Hemsworth Divisional Labour Party. While Flavell was supported by some affiliated bodies, he voluntarily withdrew, believing that Griffiths had stronger backing.

The Independent Labour Party considered putting forward Isaac Burns, a local councillor and miner. The Conservative Party indicated that, if it did so, it would probably also put forward a candidate, hoping to take advantage of a split left-wing vote. Ultimately, both parties decided not to stand, and Griffiths was elected unopposed.

== See also ==
- 1946 Hemsworth by-election
- 1991 Hemsworth by-election
- 1996 Hemsworth by-election
- List of United Kingdom by-elections
