= George Buckley (British politician) =

British Labour MP

Member of Parliament for Hemsworth
- In office 11 June 1987 – 14 September 1991
- Preceded by: Alec Woodall
- Succeeded by: Derek Enright

Personal details
- Born: 6 April 1935 South Kirkby, England
- Died: 14 September 1991 (aged 56)
- Party: Labour
- Spouse: Jenny Swift
- Children: George Buckley, Julie Buckley

George James Buckley (6 April 1935 – 14 September 1991) was a British Labour Party politician. He was the Member of Parliament for Hemsworth from 1987 until his death.

Buckley was born in South Kirkby and worked as a coal miner. He served on Wakefield Council from 1973 to 1987.

Buckley was married and had two children. He died from cancer on 14 September 1991, aged 56.

Parliament of the United Kingdom
Preceded by Alec Woodall	Member of Parliament for Hemsworth; 1987–1991	Succeeded by Derek Enright
