= Hemsworth (constituency) =

Parliamentary constituency in the United Kingdom, 1918–2024

- Former county constituency for the House of Commons
- 2010–2024 boundary of Hemsworth in West Yorkshire

- Location of West Yorkshire within England
- County: West Yorkshire
- Electorate: 74,001 (December 2019)
- Major settlements: South Wakefield, Hemsworth and Featherstone

1918–2024
- Seats: One
- Created from: Barnsley, Normanton and Osgoldcross
- Replaced by: Normanton and Hemsworth; Ossett and Denby Dale (minor part)

Hemsworth was a constituency (Note: A county constituency (for the purposes of election expenses and type of returning officer)) in West Yorkshire represented in the House of Commons since 1996 by Jon Trickett of the Labour Party. (Note: As with all constituencies, the constituency elects one Member of Parliament (MP) by the first past the post system of election at least every five years.)

Further to the completion of the 2023 Periodic Review of Westminster constituencies, the seat was subjected to moderate boundary changes and reformed as Normanton and Hemsworth, to be first contested at the 2024 general election.

== Constituency profile ==
The constituency comprises former coal mining towns and villages that also provided some of the workforce for the manufacturing bases of the town of Barnsley to the south and cities of Wakefield and Leeds to the northwest. Many constituents still commute to these today. Nearby to the east over the border in North Yorkshire is Kellingley Colliery, which closed on 18 December 2015, marking the end of deep-pit coal mining in Britain. It is one of the Labour Party's longest held seats, having elected its first Labour MP in 1918, and been in continuous existence since that date.

== History ==
From the 1966 to February 1974 general elections (inclusive), Hemsworth was the safest seat for any party in the UK: the Labour vote had peaked in 1966 at 85.39% and consistently exceeded 80% from 1935 until October 1974 when the Liberal Party contested the seat for the first time since 1923. Successive boundary changes removed certain ex-mining communities to the new Barnsley East constituency in 1983: this and the addition of the more Conservative-inclined ward of Wakefield South in 1997 slightly reduced Labour's dominance, but Hemsworth remained a safe seat in the 2017 election. However, in 2019 the majority was cut from over 10,000 to just 1,180 as Labour's vote collapsed in Northern former mining seats, making it marginal for future elections.

== Boundaries ==
Map of boundaries 2010–2024

1918–1950: The Urban Districts of Cudworth and Royston, the Rural District of Hemsworth, and part of the Rural District of Barnsley.

1950–1955: The Urban Districts of Cudworth, Dearne, Hemsworth, and Royston, and the Rural District of Hemsworth.

1955–1983: The Urban Districts of Cudworth, Dearne, and Hemsworth, and the Rural District of Hemsworth.

1983–1997: The City of Wakefield wards of Crofton and Ackworth; Featherstone; Hemsworth; South Elmsall; and South Kirkby.

1997–2010: The City of Wakefield wards of Crofton and Ackworth; Featherstone; Hemsworth; South Elmsall; South Kirkby; and Wakefield South.

2010–2024: The City of Wakefield wards of Ackworth, North Elmsall and Upton; Crofton, Ryhill and Walton; Featherstone; Hemsworth; South Elmsall and South Kirkby; and Wakefield South.

This constituency covered the towns of Hemsworth, Featherstone, South Kirkby & Moorthorpe and South Elmsall, plus the southern part of Wakefield (Sandal, Agbrigg, Belle Vue) and the villages of Ackworth, Crofton, Fitzwilliam, Upton, Sharlston, Streethouse, Walton and Notton in the City of Wakefield district.

== Members of Parliament ==
Election	Member	Party
1918	John Guest	Labour
1931	Gabriel Price	Labour
1934 by-election	George Griffiths	Labour
1946 by-election	Horace Holmes	Labour
1959	Alan Beaney	Labour
Feb 1974	Alec Woodall	Labour
1987	George Buckley	Labour
1991 by-election	Derek Enright	Labour
1996 by-election	Jon Trickett	Labour
2024	Constituency abolished	

== Election results 1918–2024 ==
=== Elections in the 1910s ===
General election 1918: Hemsworth
Party		Candidate	Votes	%	±%
	Labour	John Guest	8,102	55.5	
C	Unionist	Joshua Scholefield (barrister)	6,490	44.5	
Majority			1,612	11.0	
Turnout			14,592	58.0	
	Labour win (new seat)				
C indicates candidate endorsed by the coalition government.

=== Elections in the 1920s ===
General election 1922: Hemsworth
Party	Candidate	Votes	%	±%
Labour	John Guest	14,295	63.2	+7.7
National Liberal	Frank William Crossley-Holland	8,317	36.8	New
Majority		5,978	26.4	+15.4
Turnout		22.612	76.3	+18.3
Labour hold		Swing		

General election 1923: Hemsworth
Party	Candidate	Votes	%	±%
Labour	John Guest	13,159	70.1	+6.9
Liberal	Huw Conway-Jones	5,624	29.9	New
Majority		7,535	40.2	+13.8
Turnout		18,683	61.3	−15.0
Labour hold		Swing		

General election 1924: Hemsworth
Party	Candidate	Votes	%	±%
Labour	John Guest	15,593	69.3	−0.8
Unionist	H. R. Brown	6,902	30.7	N/A
Majority		8,691	38.6	−1.6
Turnout		22,495	69.7	+8.4
Labour hold		Swing		

General election 1929: Hemsworth
Party	Candidate	Votes	%	±%
Labour	John Guest	26,075	79.9	+10.6
Unionist	R. A. Broughton	6,578	20.1	−10.6
Majority		19,497	59.8	+21.2
Turnout		32,653	75.8	+6.1
Labour hold		Swing	+10.6	

=== Elections in the 1930s ===
General election 1931: Hemsworth
Party	Candidate	Votes	%	±%
Labour	Gabriel Price	23,609	70.5	−9.4
Unionist	William Garthwaite	9,867	29.5	+9.4
Majority		13,742	41.0	−18.8
Turnout		33,476	72.9	−2.9
Labour hold		Swing	−9.4	

1934 Hemsworth by-election
Party	Candidate	Votes	%	±%
Labour	George Griffiths	Unopposed		
Labour hold				

General election 1935: Hemsworth
Party	Candidate	Votes	%	±%
Labour	George Griffiths	28,298	80.1	+9.6
Conservative	Francis Howard Collier	7,032	19.9	−9.6
Majority		21,266	60.2	+19.2
Turnout		35,330	72.3	−0.6
Labour hold		Swing	+9.6	

General Election 1939–40:

Another general election was required to take place before the end of 1940. The political parties had been making preparations for an election to take place from 1939 and by the end of this year, the following candidates had been selected;

- Labour: George Griffiths
- Conservative:

=== Elections in the 1940s ===
General election 1945: Hemsworth
Party	Candidate	Votes	%	±%
Labour	George Griffiths	33,984	81.4	+1.3
Conservative	Robert William Palliser Dawson	7,778	18.6	−1.3
Majority		26,206	62.8	+2.6
Turnout		41,762	80.8	+8.5
Labour hold		Swing	+1.3	

1946 Hemsworth by-election
Party	Candidate	Votes	%	±%
Labour	Horace Holmes	Unopposed		
Labour hold				

=== Elections in the 1950s ===
General election 1950: Hemsworth
Party	Candidate	Votes	%	±%
Labour	Horace Holmes	47,934	82.38	+1.0
National Liberal	Jean Patricia Asquith	10,254	17.62	N/A
Majority		37,680	64.76	+2.0
Turnout		58,188	88.21	+7.4
Labour hold		Swing		

General election 1951: Hemsworth
Party	Candidate	Votes	%	±%
Labour	Horace Holmes	47,402	82.71	+0.3
Conservative	Wilf Proudfoot	9,911	17.29	N/A
Majority		37,491	65.42	+0.4
Turnout		57,313	85.07	−3.1
Labour hold		Swing		

General election 1955: Hemsworth
Party	Candidate	Votes	%	±%
Labour	Horace Holmes	42,603	83.27	+0.6
Conservative	William Henry Leay	8,561	16.73	−0.6
Majority		34,042	66.54	+1.1
Turnout		51,164	79.87	−5.2
Labour hold		Swing	+0.6	

General election 1959: Hemsworth
Party	Candidate	Votes	%	±%
Labour	Alan Beaney	45,153	82.18	−1.1
Conservative	William Henry Leay	9,788	17.82	+1.1
Majority		35,365	64.36	−2.2
Turnout		54,941	83.62	+3.8
Labour hold		Swing	−1.1	

=== Elections in the 1960s ===
General election 1964: Hemsworth
Party	Candidate	Votes	%	±%
Labour	Alan Beaney	42,528	83.07	+0.9
Conservative	John RM Keatley	8,667	16.93	−0.9
Majority		33,861	66.14	+1.8
Turnout		51,195	78.81	−4.8
Labour hold		Swing	+0.9	

General election 1966: Hemsworth
Party	Candidate	Votes	%	±%
Labour	Alan Beaney	41,887	85.39	+2.3
Conservative	Sir Charles William Richards Pickthorn, 2nd Baronet	7,165	14.61	−2.3
Majority		34,722	70.78	+4.6
Turnout		49,052	76.02	−2.8
Labour hold		Swing	+2.3	

=== Elections in the 1970s ===
General election 1970: Hemsworth
Party	Candidate	Votes	%	±%
Labour	Alan Beaney	40,013	80.76	−4.6
Conservative	Michael C Tucker	9,534	19.24	+4.6
Majority		30,479	61.52	−9.3
Turnout		49,547	71.89	−4.1
Labour hold		Swing	−4.6	

General election February 1974: Hemsworth
Party	Candidate	Votes	%	±%
Labour	Alec Woodall	44,093	82.81	+2.1
Conservative	RF Kerr	9,152	17.19	−2.1
Majority		34,941	65.62	+4.1
Turnout		53,245	77.13	+5.2
Labour hold		Swing	+2.1	

General election October 1974: Hemsworth
Party	Candidate	Votes	%	±%
Labour	Alec Woodall	37,467	76.51	−6.3
Conservative	P Carvis	5,895	12.04	−5.2
Liberal	R Taylor	5,607	11.45	New
Majority		31,572	64.47	−1.2
Turnout		48,969	70.15	−7.0
Labour hold		Swing	−0.6	

General election 1979: Hemsworth
Party	Candidate	Votes	%	±%
Labour	Alec Woodall	36,509	69.61	−6.9
Conservative	John Whitfield	10,466	19.95	+7.9
Liberal	T Fussey	5,474	10.44	−1.0
Majority		26,043	49.66	−14.8
Turnout		52,449	73.27	+3.1
Labour hold		Swing	−7.4	

=== Elections in the 1980s ===
General election 1983: Hemsworth
Party	Candidate	Votes	%	±%
Labour	Alec Woodall	22,081	59.3	−10.3
Liberal	John Wooffindin	7,891	21.2	+10.8
Conservative	David Williamson	7,291	19.6	−0.3
Majority		14,190	38.1	−10.6
Turnout		37,263	68.6	−4.7
Labour hold		Swing		

General election 1987: Hemsworth
Party	Candidate	Votes	%	±%
Labour	George Buckley	27,859	67.0	+7.7
Conservative	Edward Garnier	7,159	17.2	−2.4
Liberal	John Wooffindin	6,568	15.8	−5.4
Majority		20,700	49.8	+11.7
Turnout		41,586	75.7	+7.1
Labour hold		Swing		

=== Elections in the 1990s ===
1991 Hemsworth by-election
Party	Candidate	Votes	%	±%
Labour	Derek Enright	15,895	66.3	−0.7
Liberal Democrats	Valerie Megson	4,808	20.1	+4.3
Conservative	Garnet Harrison	2,512	10.5	−6.7
Independent Labour	Paul Ablett	648	2.7	New
Corrective Party	Timothy Smith	108	0.5	New
Majority		11,097	46.3	−3.5
Turnout		23,971		
Labour hold		Swing	+3.0	

General election 1992: Hemsworth
Party	Candidate	Votes	%	±%
Labour	Derek Enright	29,942	70.8	+3.8
Conservative	Garnet Harrison	7,867	18.6	+1.4
Liberal Democrats	Valerie Megson	4,459	10.5	−5.3
Majority		22,075	52.2	+2.4
Turnout		42,268	75.9	+0.2
Labour hold		Swing	+1.2	

1996 Hemsworth by-election
Party	Candidate	Votes	%	±%
Labour	Jon Trickett	15,817	71.9	+1.1
Conservative	Norman Hazell	1,942	8.8	−9.8
Liberal Democrats	David Ridgeway	1,516	6.9	−3.6
Socialist Labour	Brenda Nixon	1,193	5.4	New
Monster Raving Loony	Screaming Lord Sutch	652	3.0	New
UKIP	Peter Davies	455	2.1	New
Green	Peg Alexander	157	0.7	New
Independent	Mark Thomas	122	0.6	New
National Democrats	Michael Cooper	111	0.5	New
Natural Law	Dianne Leighton	28	0.1	New
Majority		13,875	63.1	+10.9
Turnout		21,993	39.5	−36.4
Labour hold		Swing	+5.45	

General election 1997: Hemsworth
Party	Candidate	Votes	%	±%
Labour	Jon Trickett	32,088	70.6	+6.8
Conservative	Norman Hazell	8,096	17.8	−8.0
Liberal Democrats	Jacqueline Kirby	4,033	8.9	−1.5
Referendum	Derek Irvine	1,260	2.8	New
Majority		23,992	52.8	+14.8
Turnout		45,477	67.9	−8.0
Labour hold		Swing	+7.4	

The constituency underwent boundary changes prior to the 1997 election and the changes are not based on the 1992 result.

=== Elections in the 2000s ===
General election 2001: Hemsworth
Party	Candidate	Votes	%	±%
Labour	Jon Trickett	23,036	65.4	−5.2
Conservative	Liz Truss	7,400	21.0	+3.2
Liberal Democrats	Ed Waller	3,990	11.3	+2.4
Socialist Labour	Paul Turek	801	2.3	New
Majority		15,636	44.4	−8.4
Turnout		35,227	51.8	−16.1
Labour hold		Swing	−4.2	

General election 2005: Hemsworth
Party	Candidate	Votes	%	±%
Labour	Jon Trickett	21,630	58.8	−6.6
Conservative	Jonathan Mortimer	8,149	22.1	+1.1
Liberal Democrats	David Hall-Matthews	5,766	15.7	+4.4
Veritas	John Burdon	1,247	3.4	New
Majority		13,481	36.7	−7.7
Turnout		36,792	54.6	+2.8
Labour hold		Swing	−3.85	

=== Elections in the 2010s ===
General election 2010: Hemsworth
Party	Candidate	Votes	%	±%
Labour	Jon Trickett	20,506	46.8	−11.9
Conservative	Ann Myatt	10,662	24.3	+2.2
Liberal Democrats	Alan Belmore	5,667	12.9	−2.8
Independent	Ian Womersley	3,946	9.0	New
BNP	Ian Kitchen	3,059	7.0	New
Majority		9,844	22.5	−14.1
Turnout		43,840	60.4	+6.1
Labour hold		Swing	−7.0	

General election 2015: Hemsworth
Party	Candidate	Votes	%	±%
Labour	Jon Trickett	21,772	51.3	+4.5
Conservative	Christopher Pearson	9,694	22.9	−1.4
UKIP	Steve Ashton	8,565	20.2	New
Liberal Democrats	Mary MacQueen	1,357	3.2	−9.7
Yorkshire	Martin Roberts	1,018	2.4	New
Majority		12,078	28.4	+5.9
Turnout		42,406	58.3	−2.1
Labour hold		Swing	−2.95	

General election 2017: Hemsworth
Party	Candidate	Votes	%	±%
Labour	Jon Trickett	25,740	56.0	+4.7
Conservative	Mike Jordan	15,566	33.9	+11.0
UKIP	David Dews	2,591	5.6	−14.6
Yorkshire	Martin Roberts	1,135	2.5	+0.1
Liberal Democrats	Mary MacQueen	912	2.0	−1.2
Majority		10,174	22.1	−6.3
Turnout		45,944	63.9	+5.6
Labour hold		Swing	−3.15	

General election 2019: Hemsworth
Party	Candidate	Votes	%	±%
Labour	Jon Trickett	16,460	37.5	−18.5
Conservative	Louise Calland	15,280	34.8	+0.9
Brexit Party	Waj Ali	5,930	13.5	New
Independent	Ian Womersley	2,458	5.6	New
Liberal Democrats	James Monaghan	1,734	3.9	+1.9
Yorkshire	Martin Roberts	964	2.2	−0.3
Green	Lyn Morton	916	2.1	New
Independent	Pete Wilks	165	0.4	New
Majority		1,180	2.7	−19.4
Turnout		43,907	59.6	−4.3
Labour hold		Swing	−9.7	

== See also ==
- 1934 Hemsworth by-election
- 1946 Hemsworth by-election
- 1991 Hemsworth by-election
- 1996 Hemsworth by-election
- List of parliamentary constituencies in West Yorkshire

== Sources ==
- Craig, F. W. S. (1983) [1969]. British parliamentary election results 1918–1949 (3rd ed.). Chichester: Parliamentary Research Services. ISBN 0-900178-06-X.
