= 1946 Hemsworth by-election =

UK parliamentary by-election

The 1946 Hemsworth by-election was a parliamentary by-election held in England for the British House of Commons constituency of Hemsworth on 22 February 1946. The seat had become vacant on the death of the Labour Member of Parliament George Griffiths, who had held the seat since a 1934 by-election.

The Labour candidate, Horace Holmes, was returned unopposed. This was the last uncontested Parliamentary election to date outside Northern Ireland.

During World War II, unopposed by-elections were common, since the major parties had agreed not to contest by-elections when vacancies arose in seats held by the other parties; contests occurred only when independent candidates or minor parties chose to stand, and the Common Wealth Party was formed with the specific aim of contesting war-time by-elections.

Hemsworth was one of Labour's safest seats: Labour's share of vote in Hemsworth had exceeded 80% both in 1935 and 1945. This may have been a factor in the lack of a Conservative candidate at the by-election.

== See also ==
- 1934 Hemsworth by-election
- 1991 Hemsworth by-election
- 1996 Hemsworth by-election
- The town of Hemsworth
- List of United Kingdom by-elections
