= James Gilliland =

James Gilliland OBE (11 May 1866 – 27 December 1952) was a British trade unionist.

Born in East Rainton, Gilliand grew up in Crook and became a coal miner at an early age. He was elected as a checkweighman at Lintz Green Colliery in 1897, then in 1907 moved to become checkweighman at Ouston E. He also became involved with the Durham Miners' Association (DMA), and stood to become its agent in 1915, but was not elected. He also lost elections for the DMA financial secretary post in 1919, losing to Peter Lee, and another for the agent role in 1923, losing to John Swan. He was eventually elected as agent in 1925, and through this served on the executive of the Miners Federation of Great Britain for much of the period 1925 to 1939.

In 1930, Gilliand became the DMA's compensation secretary, and in 1935 he was elected president, serving until his retirement in 1945. He was also active in the Labour Party, serving on Tanfield Urban District Council and then Durham County Council, holding the Birtley seat from 1925 until 1951.

In his spare time, Gilliand was a Methodist preacher, and served as a magistrate. He was made an Officer of the Order of the British Empire in 1943.

Trade union offices
Preceded by James Robson	President of the Durham Miners' Association; 1935–1945	Succeeded by Edward Moore
