= Edward Hughes (trade unionist) =

British trade unionist

Edward Hughes (22 March 1856 – 10 March 1925) was a British trade unionist.

Born in Berthengam in Flintshire, Hughes worked above ground at a local coal mine from the age of seven. He later moved to work at Mostyn Quay Colliery, then Hanmer Colliery. In 1875, he moved to Easington in County Durham to work at South Hetton Colliery, where he was active in supporting a strike in the mid-1880s. He returned to North Wales in 1887 to work for the Point of Ayr Colliery Company, where he led a three-week strike, and was subsequently elected as the pit's first checkweighman.

Hughes was a founder of the North Wales Miners' Federation, becoming its Financial Secretary in 1893. In 1897, this post was renamed as "General Secretary" of the union, and from 1898 he additionally served as the union's full-time agent. He frequently served on the executive of the Miners' Federation of Great Britain.

Hughes was elected to Denbighshire County Council in 1901, serving until 1918. He died in 1925, still serving in his union posts, and was succeeded by his son, Hugh. During his time as general secretary of what had been renamed the "North Wales Miners' Association", membership had increased from under 3,000 to over 15,000. He was succeeded by his son, Hugh Hughes.

Trade union offices
Preceded by S. Roberts	General Secretary of the North Wales Miners' Association; 1893 – 1925	Succeeded by Hugh Hughes
