= Ted Jones (trade unionist) =

Welsh trade union leader

- Born: 24 February 1896; Llangollen, Wales, U.K.
- Died: 6 February 1978 (aged 81)
- Organizations: North Wales Miners' Association; Miners' Federation of Great Britain; National Union of Mineworkers; Miners' International Federation

Edward Jones (24 February 1896 – 6 February 1978) was a Welsh trade union leader.

Born in Llangollen, in Denbighshire, Jones became an apprentice baker when he was fifteen, but later followed his father and elder brother into coal mining, working at Wynnstay, Gresford and then Llay Main. He joined the North Wales Miners' Association (NWMA), representing Llay Main on its council, and then becoming the union's president.

General Secretary of the NWMA, Hugh Hughes, died in 1932, and while it was temporarily run by the district executive, in 1934 it finally ran an election for his replacement. Jones defeated president Thomas Jones and Robert Ellis from Hafod to win the post. His first act was to rename the union as the "North Wales and Border Counties Mineworkers' Association". He worked to increase union membership, represented the union at inquiries into the Gresford disaster, and led a largely unsuccessful five-week strike at Bersham. He managed to gradually build up a branch at Point of Ayr, leading eventually to the dissolution of the rival Point of Ayr Industrial Union.

The NWMA was part of the Miners' Federation of Great Britain, and in 1944 this became the National Union of Mineworkers (NUM), with the NWMA becoming its North Wales Area. This meant less autonomy, but Jones came to greater national prominence, winning election to the national executive committee of the NUM, on which he was known as a right-winger. He was offered a post with the National Coal Board in 1949, but turned it down as it would have meant moving away from Wales.

By 1954, Jones was the longest-serving member of the NUM's executive, and he won election as the union's vice president. He defeated Alex Moffat to retain the vice-presidency in both 1955 and 1959, and also served a term as secretary of the Miners' International Federation. Following the death of president-elect Alwyn Machen in 1960, Jones spent a few months as acting president of the union, retiring in 1961.

In his spare time, Jones represented the Labour Party on Wrexham Borough Council, and was also a magistrate.

Trade union offices
Preceded by Hugh Hughes	General Secretary of the North Wales Miners' Association; 1934–1961	Succeeded by Jos Ellis
Preceded by Ernest Jones	Vice-President of the National Union of Mineworkers; 1954–1961	Succeeded by Fred Collindridge
Preceded by Ernest Jones	Secretary of the Miners' International Federation; 1960–1962	Succeeded by Dennis Edwards
