= Eddie Collins (disambiguation) =

Eddie Collins (1887–1951) was an American baseball player.

Eddie Collins may also refer to:

- Eddie Collins (actor) (1883–1940), American comedian, actor and singer
- Eddie Collins (miner) (1894–1972), Yorkshire miner, labour activist and local councillor
- Eddie Collins (catcher) (fl. 1910–1918), American baseball player
- Eddie Collins Jr. (1916–2000), American baseball player
- Eddie Collins (politician) (1941–2019), Irish politician, Minister of State
- Greydon Square (Eddie Collins, born 1981), American rapper
- Eddie Collins, guitarist with Shai Hulud

== See also ==
- Ed Collins (disambiguation)
- Edward Collins (disambiguation)
- Edmund Collins (disambiguation)
- Edwyn Collins (born 1959), Scottish musician, producer and record label owner
