= William House (trade unionist) =

English trade unionist (1854–1917)

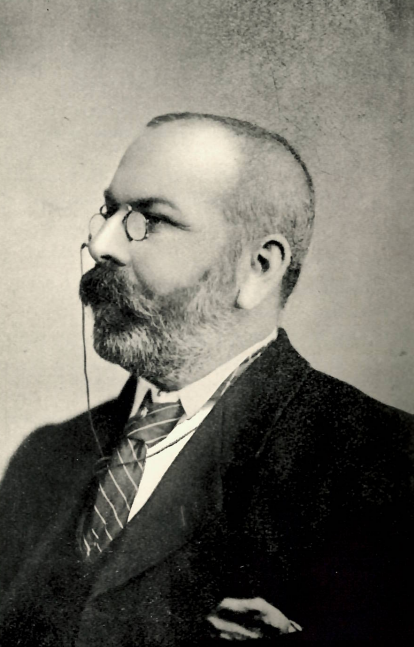
House in the 1900s

William House (18 January 1854 – 7 May 1917) was an English trade unionist.

House grew up in the West Auckland area of County Durham. He worked for many years as a coal miner, and joined the Independent Labour Party. He was elected to Durham County Council, then as a checkweighman for his pit. He was particularly prominent in the 1892 miners' strike, and became known for his public speaking. In 1899, he was chosen as an agent for the Durham Miners' Association, and he was elected as the union's president the following year, serving until his death.

House stood for the Labour Party at Bishop Auckland for the January and December 1910 general elections, coming within 5% of victory on the second occasion. He also stood unsuccessfully in the 1913 Houghton-le-Spring by-election. The following year, he became vice-president of the Miners' Federation of Great Britain. He was the union's choice to replace John Wilson in the 1915 Mid Durham by-election, but they ultimately chose not to stand him, due to the electoral truce during the First World War.

== Links ==
Trade union offices
| Preceded by John Forman | President of the Durham Miners' Association; 1900–1917 | Succeeded by James Robson |
| Preceded by W. E. Harvey | Vice-President of the Miners' Federation of Great Britain; 1914–1917 | Succeeded by Herbert Smith |
