= John Forman (trade unionist) =

British trade unionist

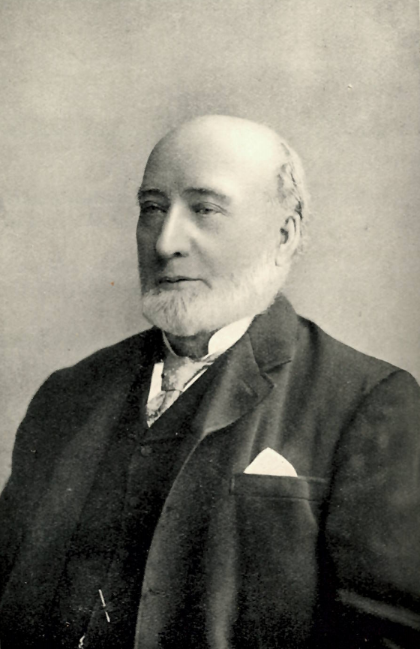
Forman in the 1890s

John Forman (c. 1823–2 September 1900) was a British trade unionist and President of the Durham Miners' Association (1871-1900).

== Early life ==
John Forman was born at East Allerdean and baptised (with his twin sister Mary) in nearby St. Anne's church, Ancroft in Northumberland. The family moved to nearby Seaton Delaval where he was educated and became a coal miner at an early age. He "made use of every available opportunity to improve his mind and his station in life".

In 1851 he married Sarah Musgrove in St. Mary's Church, Gateshead. They had six children: Benjamin Musgrove, William Duncan, John Frederick, Mary Margaret Margery, Eva Annie Annalinda and Florence Regina.

At some point in the 1850s, he moved to the Annfield Plain district and in 1853 he was working in Dipton colliery. In 1861 he lived in Bantling Castle (now East Castle in Greencroft) and in 1862 he was Deputy Overman at one of the Annfield Plain collieries. In 1868 he was a Deputy at Pontop colliery and was involved in the rescue operations during the inundation there.

== Union Activities ==
Whilst in Annfield Plain, he became involved in the labour movement and in 1867 was the delegate for Annfield Plain to the Northumberland & Durham Miners' Relief Fund. He moved to Roddymoor (near Crook) in County Durham, where he was elected checkweighman at Grahamsley Colliery. "In this capacity, as representative of the Crook miners he was actively identified with the earliest endeavors of the Durham mineworkers to form a trade union". He joined the Durham Miners' Association on its formation and was a member of the first executive. He became President in 1871 and served until his death in 1900; he was Chairman of the first Durham Miners' Gala in 1872. He worked as its agent for twenty-eight years.

== Mine Rescue ==
Forman was also involved in mine rescue operations, including:

- the explosions at Seaham Colliery in 1871 and 1880,
- the West Stanley Pit disaster of 1882,
- the Trimdon Grange colliery explosion of 1882,
- the Tudhoe colliery explosion of 1882
- the Usworth (Unsworth) colliery explosion of 1885 .
- the Elemore Colliery Explosion, 1886.

This led him to an interest in mine safety, and he was involved in theoretical work on the ignition of coal dust.

== Memorials ==
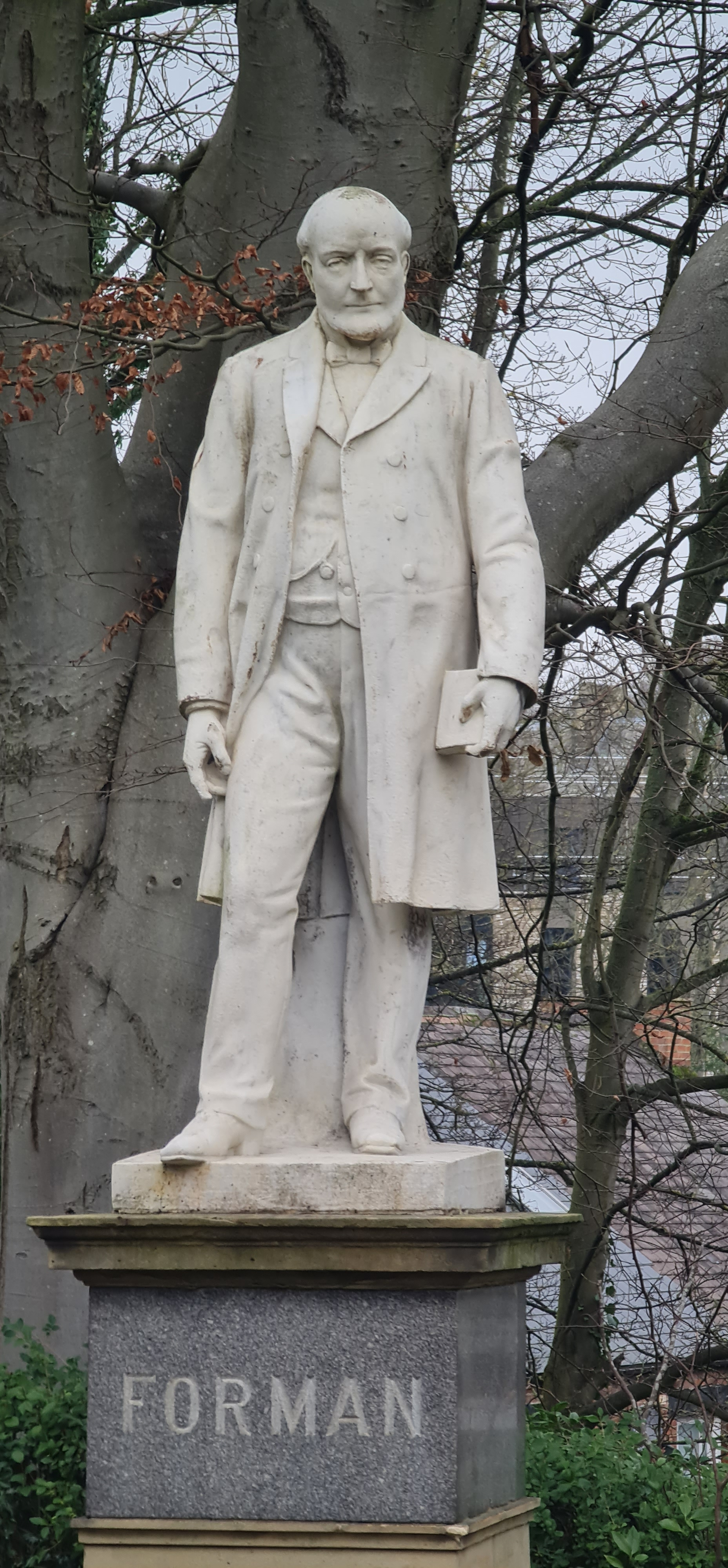
Statue of John Forman

There is a blue plaque on his house at 16 Mowbray Street, Durham which reads: "John Forman b1823 d 1900. Played a central role in forming the Durham Miners' Association, founded in 1869. One of its first agents and president from 1872 until his death. Lived here 1882-1900."

A statue of John Forman was raised outside the original Durham Miners' Hall in North Road in June 1905 and a eulogy was given by John Wilson (Mid Durham MP); it was moved to the new Durham Miners' Hall site at Redhills in 1916 where it remains.

Trade union offices
Preceded by William Crawford	President of the Durham Miners' Association; 1871–1900	Succeeded by William House
