= Thomas Trotter (trade unionist) =

British trade unionist

Thomas Ernest Newlands Trotter (10 November 1871 – 22 November 1932) was a British trade unionist.

Born in Durham, Trotter was educated at the Fulwell School in Sunderland. Orphaned in his youth, he was brought up by an aunt and uncle. In 1886, he began working as a clerk for the Durham Miners' Association (DMA). Despite never working as a miner, he was elected as an agent for the union. In 1915, he became the DMA's treasurer, and served in the post until his death. He also served on the executive of the Miners' Federation of Great Britain on several occasions from 1916 to 1931.

Although Trotter did not enter politics, he was a founder member of the City of Durham branch of the Labour Party in 1918, and campaigned for the formation and entry to the Football League of Durham City A.F.C.

Trade union offices
Preceded by Thomas Cann	Treasurer of the Durham Miners' Association; 1915 – 1932	Succeeded by Sam Watson
Preceded by Arthur Lummis Gibson and John Twomey	Auditor of the Trades Union Congress; 1932; With: Clement Stott	Succeeded by Arthur Lummis Gibson and E. Irwin
