= Jack W. Smith =

British trade unionist

Jack W. Smith was a British trade unionist.

Born in Coalville, Leicestershire in 1882 or 1883, Smith worked at Linby Colliery from the age of thirteen. He joined the Nottinghamshire Miners' Association (NMA) and quickly became a key supporter of Herbert Booth, and he joined the British Socialist Party.

Smith later moved to Hucknall, where he stood for the Labour Party in local elections. He frequently came into dispute with the leadership of the NMA and, on one occasion, he broke the windows of their headquarters. Perhaps for this reason, he moved to Ellistown in Coalville, where he was elected agent for the Leicestershire Miners' Association (LMA), replacing Levi Lovett, and he was soon elected onto the executive committee of the Miners' Federation of Great Britain (MFGB), where he was a supporter of A. J. Cook. He organised swimming galas in the town, participating himself.

During the 1926 United Kingdom general strike, and the miners' strike which followed, Smith organised a fundraising caravan tour, where he spoke alongside the comedian Billy Burton. However, this was unpopular with some union members, who felt that he should be more involved in union business in the county. Although he returned, he went on a short awareness-raising tour of Russia in November. Through these activities, he split with the majority of his union's executive, in particular, the right-wing secretary Tom Gowdridge, who had encouraged miners to return to work.

The strike concluded by the end of the year, and Gowdridge announced that the union could no longer afford to pay an agent. Smith was upset by what he saw as political manoeuvering, and the de-politicisation of the union. He resigned and formed the rival "New Miners' Union" in January 1927, immediately attracting somewhere between one hundred and 250 members, in a similar fashion to the later creation of the United Mineworkers of Scotland. He asked that his organisation be permitted to affiliate to the MFGB, but Cook instead decided that the two rival unions should be reunited. Smith disbanded his union in March, on condition that the LMA hold an election for a new agent, and accept his candidacy for the post. Gowdridge ultimately did not hold an election, and the unemployed Smith instead moved to Leicester and set up an ice cream-selling business. This not a success, and he moved on to London, where he slept rough, before returning to Coalville.

Although, on his return, Smith had no formal organisation of supporters, he retained considerable sympathy among the rank-and-file miners, and he organised well-attended political meetings. He spoke forcefully against Gowdridge and, in 1934, he was in the news for threatening to break the LMA's office windows. By this time, he was well known as a poacher, but also worked legally, sweeping streets and undertaking general labouring. In 1936, the LMA finally held an election for a new agent, judging correctly that Smith no longer had sufficient support to be elected - despite campaigning, he failed to be nominated by a single branch.
