= Levi Lovett =

British trade unionist

Levi Lovett (2 February 1854 – 7 April 1929) was a British trade unionist.

Born in Hugglescote, Leicestershire, Lovett worked in coal mining from the age of 12. A devout Methodist and lay preacher, he was elected as checkweighman at Snibston No.2 colliery in 1885, then in 1887 was the founding President of the Coalville and District Miners' Association. He served in this post until 1902, when he became the union's agent.

Although generally politically liberal, Lovett was asked to stand for the Labour Party in Bosworth at the 1918 general election, although he did not end up being the party's candidate. He continued as agent of the renamed Leicestershire Miners' Association until 1923, when he was replaced by Jack W. Smith.
