= W. H. Patterson =

British trade unionist (1847–1896)

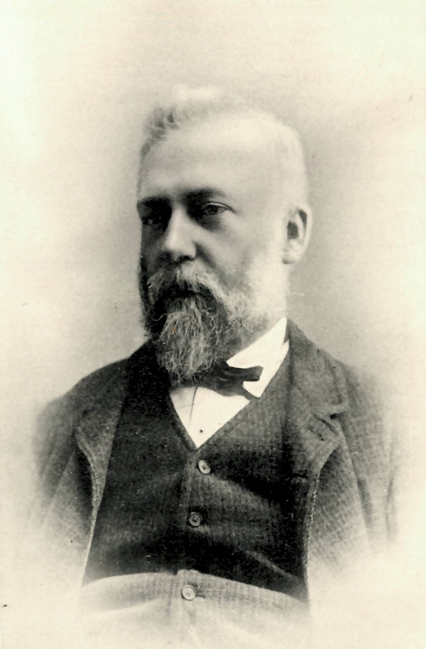
Patterson in the 1890s

William Hammond Patterson (14 February 1847 – 16 July 1896), known as W. H. Patterson, was a British trade unionist.

Born in Newcastle-upon-Tyne to a Primitive Methodist family, Patterson's father worked in quarrying, and he was sent to work at the quarry in Jesmond when only eleven years old. Within a year, he moved to Heworth Colliery, and began his career in coal mining.

In 1865, a trade union lodge was established at Heworth, and Patterson was appointed as its secretary. He was a delegate to the 1869 meeting which founded the Durham Miners' Association, and served on its first executive, being elected as its agent for south-west Durham in 1870. He was elected as financial secretary in 1872, and his expertise in this role, along with his service as vice president from 1878, led him to be elected as general secretary on William Crawford's death in 1890. However, his time leading the union was troubled, as it attempted to take its own course during the 1893 United Kingdom miners' strike. He died in 1896 aged 49, still in post.

Trade union offices
Preceded by William Crawford	Secretary of the Durham Miners' Association; 1890–1896	Succeeded by John Wilson
