= Ernest Jones (trade unionist) =

British trade unionist (1895–1973)

- Born: 14 April 1895
- Died: 19 July 1973 (aged 78)
- Occupation: Trade unionist

William Ernest Jones, CBE (14 April 1895–19 July 1973) was a British trade unionist.

== Background ==
Jones worked from the age of 13, initially repairing boots, then as a coal miner in Derbyshire. In 1918, he transferred to Rossington Colliery in southern Yorkshire, where he became active in the Yorkshire Miners' Association (YMA). He was elected to Doncaster Rural District Council for the Labour Party in 1924, then as checkweighman in 1926, and to the West Riding of Yorkshire County Council in 1928.

In 1939, Jones won election as general secretary of the YMA, and for part of World War II he served as Regional Labour Director for the Ministry of Fuel and Power. In 1950, he became Vice-President of the National Union of Mineworkers (NUM), and also gained a seat on the General Council of the Trades Union Congress. In 1954, he was elected President of the NUM, serving until his retirement in 1960. He was also Secretary of the Miners' International Federation from 1957 to 1960. In retirement, he served on the National Savings Committee. In 1961, he was appointed a CBE.

Trade union offices
Preceded by Joseph Jones	General Secretary of the Yorkshire Miners' Association; 1939–1954	Succeeded by Fred Collindridge
Preceded by Jim Bowman	Vice-President of the National Union of Mineworkers; 1950–1954	Succeeded by Ted Jones
Preceded by Will Lawther	President of the National Union of Mineworkers; 1954–1960	Succeeded by Alwyn Machen
Preceded by Will Lawther	Secretary of the Miners' International Federation; 1957–1960	Succeeded by Ted Jones
