= James Robson (trade unionist) =

British trade unionist

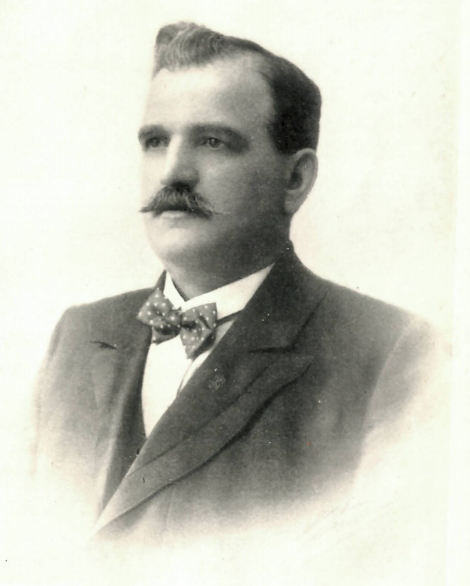
- Robson, in about 1921
- Born: 1860; West Auckland, Durham, U.K.
- Died: 1934 (aged 73–74)

James Robson (1860–1934) was a British trade unionist.

Born in West Auckland, Durham, Robson started work at the age of ten. In 1890, he was elected checkweighman at Broompark Colliery, then later moved to Bearpark Colliery. In 1917, he was elected President of the Durham Miners' Association, serving until his death in 1934. From 1918 to 1921, he also served as Treasurer of the Miners' Federation of Great Britain. He was a member of the Methodist New Connexion.

== Notes ==
Trade union offices
Preceded by William House	President of the Durham Miners' Association; 1917–1934	Succeeded by James Gilliland
Preceded by William Abraham	Treasurer of the Miners' Federation of Great Britain; 1918–1924	Succeeded by W. P. Richardson
