= Barnard Castle (constituency) =

Parliamentary constituency in the United Kingdom, 1885–1950

- Former county constituency for the House of Commons

1885–1950
- Seats: one
- Created from: South Durham
- Replaced by: Bishop Auckland and North West Durham

Barnard Castle was a county constituency centred on the town of Barnard Castle in County Durham, which returned one Member of Parliament (MP) to the House of Commons of the Parliament of the United Kingdom. It was created for the 1885 general election and abolished for the 1950 general election.

== Boundaries ==
=== 1885–1918 ===
- The Sessional Divisions of Barnard Castle and Staindrop, Stanhope (except the parishes of Hunstanworth and Edmondbyers) and Wolsingham, and part of the Sessional Division of Bishop Auckland.

The constituency was created for the 1885 general election by the Redistribution of Seats Act 1885 as one of eight new single-member divisions of the county of Durham, replacing the two 2-member seats of North Durham and South Durham. See map on Vision of Britain website.

The seat was located in the west of County Durham, in North East England. To the north of the constituency (moving from west to east) were the Northumberland division of Hexham and then North West Durham. To the east (moving from north to south) were Mid Durham, Bishop Auckland and South East Durham. To the south was Richmond (Yorks). To the west of the constituency (moving from south to north) were the Westmorland divisions of Appleby and Kendal.

=== 1918–1950 ===
- The Urban Districts of Barnard Castle and Stanhope;
- the Rural Districts of Barnard Castle and Weardale; and
- parts of the Rural Districts of Auckland and Lanchester.

The constituency was expanded northwards, absorbing the western part of the abolished North West Durham seat (Lanchester). Crook and Tow Law were added to the new constituency of Spennymoor and a small area in the east was transferred to Bishop Auckland.

=== Abolition ===
In 1950 the Barnard Castle urban and rural districts were included in the Bishop Auckland constituency. Other parts of the former constituency returned to the re-established North West Durham seat.

== Members of Parliament ==
Sir Joseph Pease

Election	Member	Party
1885	Sir Joseph Pease	Liberal
1903	Arthur Henderson	Labour
1918	John Swan	Labour
1922	John Rogerson	Conservative
1923	Moss Turner-Samuels	Labour
1924	Cuthbert Headlam	Conservative
1929	William Lawther	Labour
1931	Cuthbert Headlam	Conservative
1935	Thomas Sexton	Labour
1945	Sydney Lavers	Labour
1950	constituency abolished	

== Election results ==
=== Elections in the 1880s ===
General election 1885: Barnard Castle
Party	Candidate	Votes	%	±%
Liberal	Joseph Pease	5,962	70.82	
Conservative	Patrick Bowes-Lyon	2,457	29.18	
Majority		3,505	41.64	
Turnout		8,419	84.27	
Registered electors		9,991		
Liberal win (new seat)				

General election 1886: Barnard Castle
Party	Candidate	Votes	%	±%
Liberal	Joseph Pease	Unopposed		
Liberal hold				

=== Elections in the 1890s ===
General election 1892: Barnard Castle
Party	Candidate	Votes	%	±%
Liberal	Joseph Pease	5,337	64.60	N/A
Conservative	William M Rolley	2,924	35.40	New
Majority		2,413	29.20	N/A
Turnout		8,261	75.37	N/A
Registered electors		10,960		
Liberal hold				

General election 1895: Barnard Castle
Party	Candidate	Votes	%	±%
Liberal	Joseph Pease	4,924	56.13	−8.47
Conservative	WL Vane	3,848	43.87	+8.47
Majority		1,076	12.26	−16.94
Turnout		8,772	78.36	+2.99
Registered electors		11,194		
Liberal hold		Swing	−8.47	

=== Elections in the 1900s ===
General election 1900: Barnard Castle
Party	Candidate	Votes	%	±%
Liberal	Joseph Pease	5,036	58.69	+2.56
Conservative	WL Vane	3,545	41.31	−2.56
Majority		1,491	17.38	+5.11
Turnout		8,581	77.69	−0.67
Registered electors		11,045		
Liberal hold		Swing	+2.56	

By-election, 1903: Barnard Castle
Party	Candidate	Votes	%	±%
Labour Repr. Cmte.	Arthur Henderson	3,370	35.47	New
Conservative	WL Vane	3,323	34.97	−6.34
Liberal	Hubert Beaumont	2,809	29.56	−29.13
Majority		47	0.50	N/A
Turnout		9,502	84.64	+6.95
Registered electors		11,226		
Labour Repr. Cmte. gain from Liberal		Swing		

General election 1906: Barnard Castle (Note: Results compared to the 1900 general election, not the 1903 by-election)
Party	Candidate	Votes	%	±%
Labour	Arthur Henderson	5,540	58.76	N/A
Conservative	EW Morrison-Bell	3,888	41.23	−0.08
Majority		1,652	17.53	N/A
Turnout		9,428	81.16	+3.47
Registered electors		11,617		
Labour gain from Liberal		Swing		

=== Elections in the 1910s ===
General election January 1910: Barnard Castle
Party	Candidate	Votes	%	±%
Labour	Arthur Henderson	6,096	56.75	−2.01
Liberal Unionist	HG Stobart	4,646	43.25	+2.02
Majority		1,450	13.50	−4.02
Turnout		10,742	87.96	+6.80
Registered electors		12,212		
Labour hold		Swing	−2.02	

General election December 1910: Barnard Castle
Party	Candidate	Votes	%	±%
Labour	Arthur Henderson	5,868	57.02	+0.27
Liberal Unionist	HG Stobart	4,423	42.98	−0.27
Majority		1,445	14.04	+0.54
Turnout		10,291	84.27	−3.69
Registered electors		12,212		
Labour hold		Swing	−2.02	

General election 1918: Barnard Castle
Party		Candidate	Votes	%	±%
	Labour	John Swan	5,468	42.86	−14.16
C	Unionist	John Rogerson	3,837	30.07	−12.91
	Liberal	Albert Ernest Hillary	2,180	17.09	New
	National Farmers' Union	Octavius Monkhouse	1,274	9.99	New
Majority			1,631	12.79	−1.25
Turnout			12,759	63.96	−20.29
Registered electors			19,949		
	Labour hold		Swing	−0.63	
C indicates candidate endorsed by the coalition government.

=== Elections in the 1920s ===
General election 1922: Barnard Castle
Party	Candidate	Votes	%	±%
Unionist	John Rogerson	8,271	50.67	+20.60
Labour	John Swan	8,052	49.33	+6.47
Majority		219	1.34	N/A
Turnout		16,323	78.51	+14.55
Registered electors		20,791		
Unionist gain from Labour		Swing	+7.07	

General election 1923: Barnard Castle
Party	Candidate	Votes	%	±%
Labour	Moss Turner-Samuels	9,171	55.07	+5.74
Unionist	John Rogerson	7,482	44.93	−5.74
Majority		1,689	10.14	N/A
Turnout		16,653	78.79	+0.28
Registered electors		21,135		
Labour gain from Unionist		Swing	+5.74	

General election 1924: Barnard Castle
Party	Candidate	Votes	%	±%
Unionist	Cuthbert Headlam	9,465	50.84	+5.91
Labour	Moss Turner-Samuels	9,152	49.16	−5.91
Majority		313	1.68	N/A
Turnout		18,617	84.89	+6.10
Registered electors		21,931		
Unionist gain from Labour		Swing	+5.91	

General election 1929: Barnard Castle
Party	Candidate	Votes	%	±%
Labour	Will Lawther	9,281	42.01	−7.15
Unionist	Cuthbert Headlam	8,406	38.06	−12.78
Liberal	E Spence	4,402	19.93	New
Majority		875	3.95	N/A
Turnout		22,089	83.39	−1.50
Registered electors		26,488		
Labour gain from Unionist		Swing	+2.82	

=== Elections in the 1930s ===
General election 1931: Barnard Castle
Party	Candidate	Votes	%	±%
Conservative	Cuthbert Headlam	12,721	55.29	+17.23
Labour	Will Lawther	10,287	44.71	+2.70
Majority		2,434	10.58	N/A
Turnout		23,008	85.20	+1.81
Registered electors		27,006		
Conservative gain from Labour		Swing	+7.27	

General election 1935: Barnard Castle
Party	Candidate	Votes	%	±%
Labour	Thomas Sexton	11,458	49.80	+5.09
Conservative	Cuthbert Headlam	10,138	44.06	−11.23
Liberal	Alfred Graham	1,393	6.05	New
Majority		1,320	5.74	N/A
Turnout		23,008	84.25	−0.95
Registered electors		27,309		
Labour gain from Conservative		Swing	+8.16	

=== Election in the 1940s ===
General election 1945: Barnard Castle
Party	Candidate	Votes	%	±%
Labour	Sydney Lavers	12,024	58.30	+8.50
Conservative	Giffard Le Quesne Martel	8,600	41.70	−2.36
Majority		3,424	16.60	+10.86
Turnout		20,624	75.31	−8.94
Registered electors		27,387		
Labour hold		Swing	+5.43	

== See also ==
- History of parliamentary constituencies and boundaries in Durham

== Sources ==
- Craig, F. W. S. (1983) [1969]. British parliamentary election results 1918-1949 (3rd ed.). Chichester: Parliamentary Research Services. ISBN 0-900178-06-X.
- Leigh Rayment's Historical List of MPs – Constituencies beginning with "B" (part 1)
