= Patrick Lyons (disambiguation) =

Patrick Lyons (1903–1967) was an Australian Catholic bishop.

Patrick Lyons may also refer to:

- Pat Lyons (1860–1914), Canadian baseball player
- Pat Lyons (academic) (born 1969), Irish social scientist
- Patrick Lyons (bishop of Kilmore) (1875–1949), Irish Catholic bishop
- Patrick H. Lyons (born 1953), American politician from New Mexico
- Patrick Lyons (athletic director) (born c. 1975), American college athletics administrator

== See also ==
- Patrick Campbell-Lyons (1943–2026), Irish composer and musician
- Patrick Lyon (disambiguation)
