= Edmund Collins (disambiguation) =

Edmund Collins (1931–2014) was an Australian Roman Catholic bishop.

Edmund Collins may also refer to:

- Edmund Collins, screenwriter and actor, see Walls of Glass
- Edmund Collins, a character in the film Eulogy

== See also ==
- Ed Collins (disambiguation)
- Eddie Collins (disambiguation)
