= Ebby Edwards =

British politician (1884–1961)

Ebenezer Edwards (30 July 1884 – 6 July 1961) was a trade unionist and politician in Britain.

== Early life ==
Born in Chevington, near Broomhill, Northumberland, Edwards went down the coal mine at the age of 12. In 1906, he joined the Independent Labour Party, although he left after three years. In 1908, he attended Ruskin College in Oxford for ten months, but had to leave due to a lack of finances. After leaving the course, he became an early member of the Plebs' League and began to espouse Marxism.

== Later life ==
Edwards continued working as a miner during World War I. A supporter of Robert Smillie, he opposed the war. He narrowly missed election to Parliament at the 1918 Wansbeck by-election, standing as a local Labour Party candidate, losing to Robert Mason. He lost in Wansbeck again at the 1918 general election.

Long active in the Miners' Federation of Great Britain (MFGB), Edwards was elected to increasingly important posts in the union. In 1929, he was finally elected to Parliament, as the Labour MP for Morpeth, succeeding Smillie, but lost his seat at the 1931 election. Elected as vice-president of the MFGB in 1929, he became president in 1931 and secretary in 1932. He also served in various posts at the Miners' International Federation.

In 1945, he attended the World Trade Union Conference in London alongside many renowned trade unionists.

Edwards supported the MFGB's reconstitution as the National Union of Mineworkers (NUM), and became the NUM's first secretary in 1945, but stepped down the following year to serve on the National Coal Board, keeping this post until 1953.

Parliament of the United Kingdom
Preceded by Robert Smillie	Member of Parliament for Morpeth; 1929–1931	Succeeded by Godfrey Nicholson
Trade union offices
Preceded by John Cairns	Financial Secretary of the Northumberland Miners' Association; 1918–1929	Succeeded by John Carr
Preceded by Arthur Pugh and Will Sherwood	Trades Union Congress representative to the American Federation of Labour; 1928; With: John Marchbank	Succeeded by James Bell and James Thomas Brownlie
Preceded by Thomas Richards	Vice-President of the Miners' Federation of Great Britain; 1929–1930	Succeeded by Peter Lee
Preceded by Thomas Richards	President of the Miners' Federation of Great Britain; 1931–1932	Succeeded by Peter Lee
Preceded by A. J. Cook	Secretary of the Miners' Federation of Great Britain; 1932–1945	Succeeded by Position abolished
Preceded by Achille Delattre	Secretary of the Miners' International Federation; 1934–1947	Succeeded by Will Lawther
Preceded by Anne Loughlin	President of the Trades Union Congress; 1944–1945	Succeeded by Charles Dukes
Preceded by New position	Secretary of the National Union of Mineworkers; 1945–1946	Succeeded by Arthur Horner
