= Thomas Sexton (English politician) =

Thomas Miles Sexton (1879 – 11 July 1946) was a Labour Party politician in England.

Sexton studied for some time at Durham University, before becoming a teacher. From 1909, he was the headteacher at Stanhope County School. He joined the Labour Party, and was elected at the 1935 general election as Member of Parliament for Barnard Castle. He held the seat until he stood down at the 1945 election, and he died the following year. He died the following year, aged 67.

Parliament of the United Kingdom
Preceded by Cuthbert Headlam	Member of Parliament for Barnard Castle; 1935 – 1945	Succeeded by Sydney Lavers
