= Ted Collins =

Ted Collins or Teddy Collins may refer to:

- Ted Collins (Canadian football) (1943–2021)
- Ted Collins (manager) (1900–1964), entertainment manager and owner of football teams
- Ted Collins (footballer, born 1882) (1882–1955), English footballer
- Ted Collins (Australian footballer) (1893–1974), Australian footballer
- Teddy Collins (politician), Colorado politician

== See also ==
- Edward Collins (disambiguation)
