= Will Lawther =

British politician and trade unionist

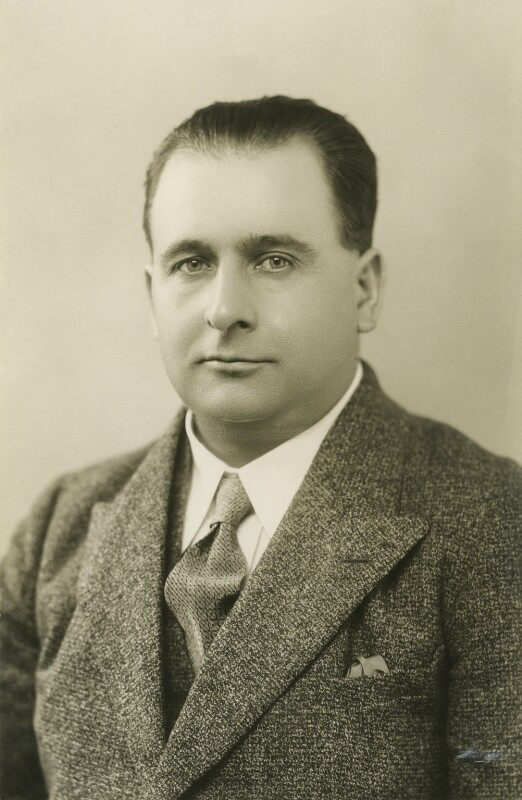
Lawther

Sir William Lawther (20 May 1889 – 1 February 1976) was a politician and trade union leader in the United Kingdom.

Born in Choppington, in Northumberland, Lawther was educated at Choppington Colliery School, then became a coal miner. He became active in the Northumberland Miners' Association, which funded him to study at the Central Labour College.

Lawther was active in the Labour Party, standing unsuccessfully for the party in South Shields at the 1922, 1923 and 1924 United Kingdom general election. From 1925 to 1929, he served on Durham County Council. At the 1929 general election, he switched to contest Barnard Castle, winning the seat, though he was defeated in 1931.

Out of Parliament, Lawther returned to trade unionism. He was elected to the General Council of the Trades Union Congress (TUC) in 1935, and as President of the Miners' Federation of Great Britain (MFGB) in 1939. The MFGB became the National Union of Mineworkers, with Lawther remaining president. In 1949, he was President of the TUC, and later that year, he was knighted.

Lawther retired from his trade union posts in 1954, and died in 1976 aged 86. Since his death, declassified archives have shown that Will Lawther had covertly been working with a secret Cold War propaganda department attached to the British Foreign Office called the Information Research Department, and was paid by the British government to promote anti-communist material.

Parliament of the United Kingdom
Preceded by Cuthbert Headlam	Member of Parliament for Barnard Castle; 1929–1931	Succeeded by Cuthbert Headlam
Trade union offices
Preceded by S. O. Davies	Vice-President of the Miners' Federation of Great Britain (MFGB); 1934–1939	Succeeded by Jim Bowman
Preceded by Joseph Jones	President of the Miners' Federation of Great Britain (MFGB); 1939–1945	Succeeded by Position abolished
Preceded by New position	President of the National Union of Mineworkers (NUM); 1945–1954	Succeeded by Ernest Jones
Preceded by Ebby Edwards	Secretary of the Miners' International Federation; 1947–1957	Succeeded by Ernest Jones
Preceded by Florence Hancock	President of the Trades Union Congress; 1949	Succeeded by Herbert Bullock
Preceded by Lincoln Evans and Tom Williamson	Trades Union Congress representative to the American Federation of Labour; 1950; With: Florence Hancock	Succeeded by Jim Kelly and Tom Yates
