= Ed Collins =

Ed Collins may refer to:

- Ed Collins (American football) player, see Indianapolis Colts draft history
- Ed Collins (rugby league), see Bulimba Cup
- Ed Collins (musician), see Karl Logan

== See also ==
- Eddie Collins (disambiguation)
- Edward Collins (disambiguation)
- Edmund Collins (disambiguation)
- Edwyn Collins, Scottish musician
