= John Rogerson (Barnard Castle MP) =

John Edwin Rogerson (8 January 1865 – 23 March 1925) was a Conservative Party politician in the United Kingdom.

Rogerson was educated at Durham School and Trinity College, Cambridge. He was appointed a deputy lieutenant of County Durham in 1905.

He contested the 1918 general election in the Labour-held Barnard Castle constituency in County Durham. He stood as a Coalition Conservative, but in a three-way contest his "coalition coupon" was insufficient to take the seat from the Labour Party candidate John Swan. Rogerson stood again at the 1922 election, when he was helped by the absence of a Liberal Party candidate, and gained the seat with a narrow majority over Swan.

Rogerson's tenure as Member of Parliament (MP) for Barnard Castle was short-lived. At the 1923 election, Moss Turner-Samuels retook the seat for Labour with a majority of over 10%. After his defeat, Rogerson did not stand for Parliament again. He died in 1925, aged 60.

Parliament of the United Kingdom
Preceded by John Swan	Member of Parliament for Barnard Castle; 1922 – 1923	Succeeded by Moss Turner-Samuels
