= Fred Collindridge =

British trade union leader (1899–1969)

Fred Collindridge (1899–1969) was a British trade union leader.

Born in Wombwell, Collindridge became a coal miner and joined the Yorkshire Miners' Association. His older brother, Frank Collindridge, also became a prominent trade unionist, and then a Member of Parliament.

In 1946, Collindridge was elected as vice-president of the Yorkshire Miners, and then in 1954 as its general secretary. The association was part of the National Union of Mineworkers, and Collindridge served on its national executive committee from 1953 until 1961, then became its vice-president. He retired in 1964, and died five years later.

Trade union offices
Preceded by Edward Hough	Vice President of the Yorkshire Area of the National Union of Mineworkers; 1946–1954	Succeeded by Sam Bullough
Preceded by Ernest Jones	General Secretary of the Yorkshire Area of the National Union of Mineworkers; 1954–1964	Succeeded by Sid Schofield
Preceded by Ted Jones	Vice President of the National Union of Mineworkers; 1961–1963	Succeeded by Sam Bullough
