= John Swan (British politician) =

British politician

John Edmund Swan (1877 – 9 February 1956) was a Labour Party politician in England.

Swan was born in Dipton, County Durham. He became a coal miner, and was later elected as checkweighman, also becoming active in the Durham Miners' Association (DMA).

He was elected at the 1918 general election as Member of Parliament (MP) for Barnard Castle in County Durham, but lost his seat at the 1922 election to the Conservative Party candidate, John Edwin Rogerson.

Out of Parliament, Swan devoted his time to the DMA, and he was elected as its general secretary in 1935, serving until 1945. He also remained active in the Labour Party, serving on its National Executive Committee from 1932 until 1941, and on both the Annfield Plain Urban District Council, and the Lanchester Board of Guardians.

In his spare time, Swan wrote the novels The Mad Miner (published 1933) and People of the Night, and the play, On the Minimum.

Parliament of the United Kingdom
Preceded by Arthur Henderson	Member of Parliament for Barnard Castle; 1918 – 1922	Succeeded by John Edwin Rogerson
Trade union offices
Preceded by Peter Lee	General Secretary of the Durham Miners' Association; 1935–1945	Succeeded by Sam Watson
