= Kent Miners' Association =

Trade union in the United Kingdom

- Merged into: National Union of Mineworkers
- Founded: 1915
- Dissolved: 1945
- Location: United Kingdom
- Members: 5100 (1945)
- Affiliations: Miners' Federation of Great Britain

The Kent Miners' Association was a trade union in the United Kingdom which existed between 1915 and 1945, representing coal miners in the county of Kent. After 1945 it was reorganised as the Kent Area of the National Union of Mineworkers.

== Early history ==
Coal was discovered in Kent in the late-19th century, but extraction did not begin until 1912. The Kent Miners Association was established in 1915, and immediately affiliated to the Miners' Federation of Great Britain. Working conditions in the mines were poor, and mine owners struggled to attract workers, giving a strong bargaining position to the union.

In 1941, a dispute emerged over additional payments for working a particularly difficult seam. Official arbitration backed the mineowners, prompting more than 4,000 coal miners to strike, despite a wartime ban on industrial action. The government responded by arresting 1,000 miners and imprisoning three union officials with hard labour, but when only nine workers paid their fines, the government was forced to negotiate with the gaoled union leaders who were released after eleven days and the fines waived.

The union became the Kent Area of the National Union of Mineworkers in 1945, by which time, membership had reached 5,100. In 1961, 160 workers at Betteshanger were served with redundancy notices. A stay-down strike was launched, which succeeded in persuading the National Coal Board to open a new seam, allowing the workforce to remain at the same level.

== 1984-85 Strike ==
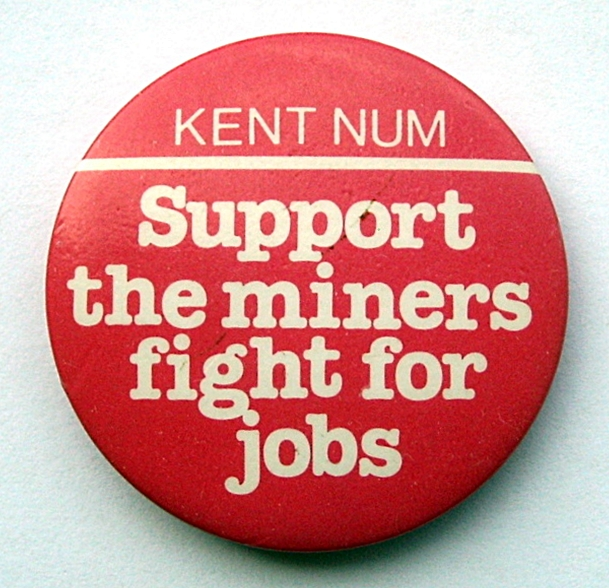
Kent NUM badge produced in support of 1984 strike.

One pit closed in 1969, and two more were listed for closure in 1981. The area was strongly supportive of the UK miners' strike of 1984–1985. The Kent miners were successful in raising funds from sympathetic socialists in London and from trade unions in continental Europe, which allowed the Kent strikers to maintain a higher standard of living that those in other parts of Britain and generated some resentment. Malcolm Pitt, the area president, was jailed for allegedly breaching bail conditions, and suspected miners were turned back at the Dartford Tunnel to prevent picketing. The Kent NUM applied for an injunction against use of this power. Sir Michael Havers initially denied this application outright, but Mr. Justice Skinner later ruled that this power of the police may only be used if the anticipated breach of the peace were "in close proximity both in time and place".

Kent NUM leader Jack Collins said after the decision of the NUM conference in March 1985 to end the strike without an amnesty for those sacked during the dispute, "The people who have decided to go back to work and leave men on the sidelines are traitors to the trade-union movement." The Kent NUM organised a continuation of picketing across the country, which delayed the return to work at many pits for another two weeks. Arthur Scargill himself was turned back at the gates of Barrow Colliery in Worsborough when he tried to lead the miners back to work.

There were only 32 strikebreakers in Kent in the 1984-85 strike, and they were subject to so many attacks on their person and property that they had all left the industry by April 1986.

The last coal mine closed in 1989.

== General Secretaries ==
1915: W. H. Varley
1919: H. Hartley
1920s: John Elks
1948: Jack Johnson
1960: Jack Dunn
1970s: Jack Collins
