= W. P. Richardson (trade unionist) =

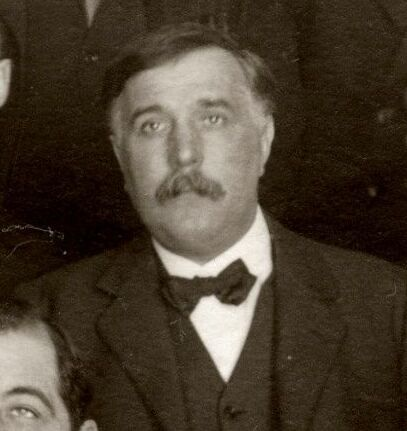
- Richardson in 1921
- Born: 25 February 1873; Usworth, County Durham, U.K.
- Died: 8 August 1930 (aged 57)
- Relatives: Thomas Richardson (brother)

William Pallister Richardson (25 February 1873 – 8 August 1930), known as W. P. Richardson, was a British trade unionist.

Richardson was born in Usworth, County Durham. His father was killed in 1885, while working in the Usworth Colliery. A few months later, William began work in the same pit. He joined the Durham Miners' Association, and became branch secretary in 1898, and was elected to the county executive in 1912. He served as General Secretary of the union from 1924 until his death in 1930 aged 57, and as treasurer of the Miners' Federation of Great Britain from 1921.

Richardson was also an active member of the Independent Labour Party, and its leading member in Usworth. His brother Tom was also active in the party, and was the Member of Parliament for Whitehaven from 1910 to 1918.

Trade union offices
Preceded by James Robson	Treasurer of the Miners' Federation of Great Britain; 1921–1930	Succeeded by Post vacant
Preceded by Thomas Cann	General Secretary of the Durham Miners' Association; 1924–1930	Succeeded by Peter Lee
