= Edward Collins =

Edward Collins may refer to:

- Edward Collins (Australian politician) (1866–1936), New South Wales politician
- Edward Collins (figure skater), Canadian figure skater
- Edward Collins (Irish politician) (1941–2019), Irish Fine Gael politician
- Edward Collins (rugby league), Australian international rugby league player
- Edward Collins (Wisconsin politician), served one year as a member of the Wisconsin State Assembly
- Edward J. Collins Jr. (1943–2007), Massachusetts civil servant and public manager
- Edward Joseph Collins (1886–1951), American pianist, conductor and composer of romantic classical music
- Edward Knight Collins (1802–1878), American shipping magnate
- Edward Treacher Collins (1862–1932), English surgeon and ophthalmologist

== See also ==
- Ed Collins (disambiguation)
- Eddie Collins (disambiguation)
- Ted Collins (disambiguation)
