= Sam Watson (trade unionist) =

Samuel Watson CBE (11 March 1898 – 7 May 1967) was Agent of the Durham Miners' Association and member of the British Labour Party’s National Executive Committee.

Watson was born on 11 March 1898 in the village of Boldon Colliery, in County Durham. After an elementary education, at the age of 14 he became an underground coalminer at Boldon Colliery. By the age of 20 he had become secretary of the Boldon Miner's Lodge, continuing to work down the pit until 1936, when he became an agent of the Durham Miners' Association. In 1947 he became General Secretary of the recently reorganised National Union of Mineworkers (Durham Area).

He was active in the Labour Party, was for 22 years a member of its National Executive Committee, and served as its chairman for the year 1949–1950. He declined the possibility of seeking political office in London, however, preferring to remain in Durham.

He was a member of committees of the National Coal Board and undertook many other charitable and educational activities. He was made a CBE in 1946. He died at his home in Durham on 7 May 1967 aged 69.

Trade union offices
Preceded by Thomas Trotter	Treasurer of the Durham Miners' Association; 1932 – 1945	Succeeded by Position abolished
Preceded by John Swan	General Secretary of the Durham Area of the National Union of Mineworkers; 1945–1963	Succeeded by Alfred Hesler
Preceded by John Brown and Arthur Horner	Trades Union Congress representative to the American Federation of Labour; 1946; With: Tom O'Brien	Succeeded by Arthur Deakin and Robert Openshaw
Party political offices
Preceded by Jim Griffiths	Chair of the Labour Party; 1949–1950	Succeeded by Alice Bacon
