= Joseph Jones (trade unionist) =

British trade unionist (1891–1948)

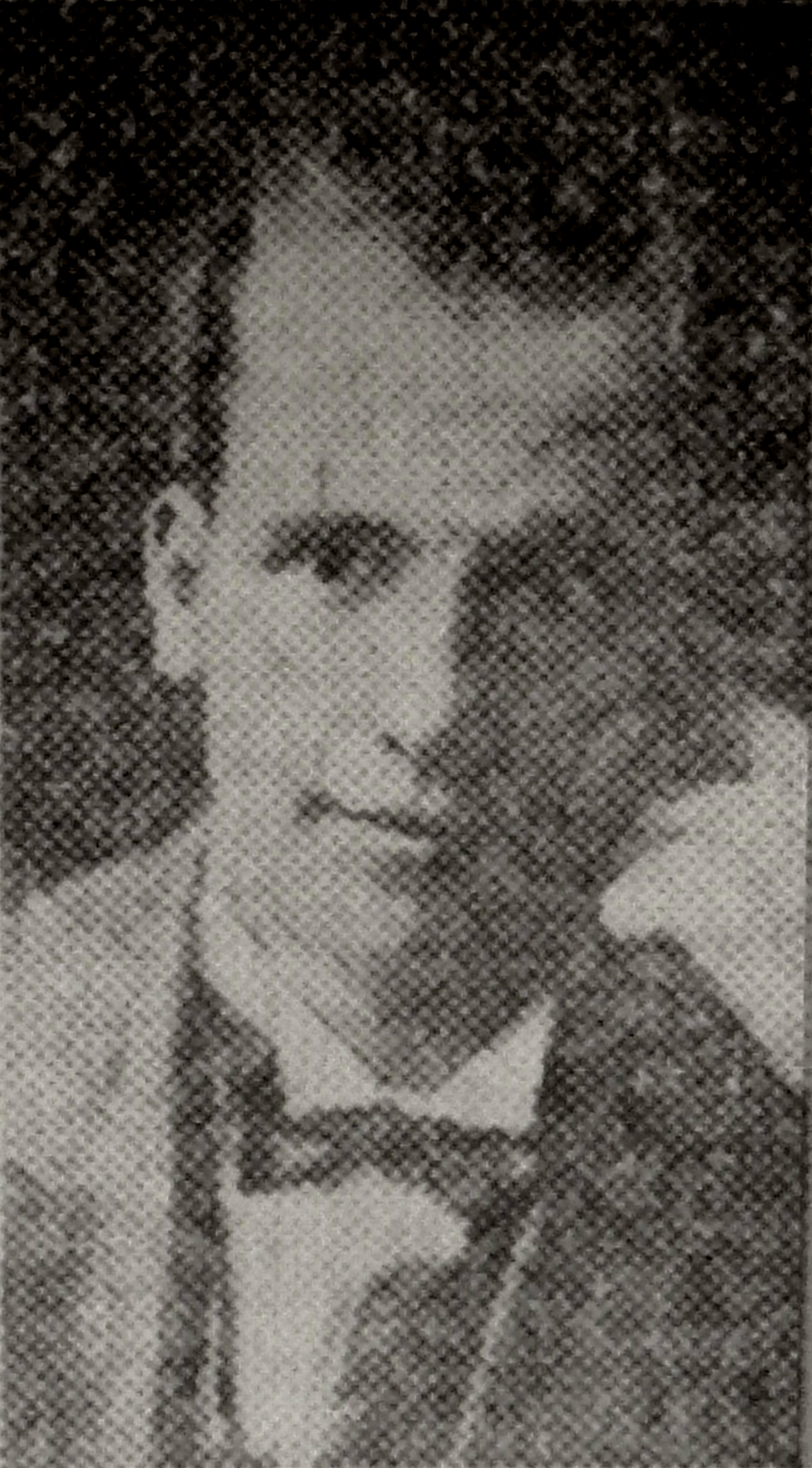
Joseph Jones, 1929

Joseph Jones (1891 – 1 April 1948) was a British trade unionist.

Born in St Helens, Jones studied at a technical college before becoming a coal miner. He moved to work at Thurcroft, and was elected branch secretary of the Yorkshire Miners' Association (YMA) in 1914. He was an active methodist, and strongly promoted the cause of temperance, later becoming Chairman of the Workers' Temperance League. He was elected as a Labour Party member of West Riding County Council in 1919, serving until 1933. In 1923, Jones was elected as Treasurer of the YMA and, the following year, he became its General Secretary. He was elected to Barnsley Town Council in 1926, serving as Mayor of Barnsley in 1931.

In 1924, Jones contested the General Secretaryship of the Miners' Federation of Great Britain (MFGB) as the candidate of the union's right-wing, but he was narrowly defeated by the communist A. J. Cook. From 1926 until 1931, Jones was on the National Executive Committee of the Labour Party, and from 1930 to 1938 he was the government's Coal Mine Reorganisation Commissioner. Jones was elected as Vice President of the MFGB in 1932, then in 1934 became the union's President. He was one of two assessors during the 1937 enquiry into the Gresford disaster. During the enquiry both assessors disagreed with the commissioner's report and published their own reports as addenda. He resigned as MFGB president in 1938 to join the Coal Commission, and in 1947 was appointed as advisor on social insurance to the National Coal Board.

Jones was a Justice of the peace (JP) and in the 1932 New Year Honours was appointed a Commander of the Order of the British Empire (CBE).

Trade union offices
Preceded by Samuel Roebuck	General Secretary of the Yorkshire Miners' Association; 1924–1938	Succeeded by Ernest Jones
Preceded by Peter Lee	Vice-President of the Miners' Federation of Great Britain; 1932–1933	Succeeded by S. O. Davies
Preceded by Peter Lee	President of the Miners' Federation of Great Britain; 1934–1938	Succeeded by Will Lawther
Preceded by John C. Little and W. R. Townley	Trades Union Congress representative to the American Federation of Labour; 1938; With: John W. Stephenson	Succeeded by Herbert Elvin
