= Sydney Lavers =

Sydney Robert Charles Lavers (4 June 1890 – 9 April 1972) was a Labour Party politician in England.

Born in Plymouth, Lavers was educated at the Plymouth Board School. He served in World War I. A few years after the war, he became an organiser with the National Union of General and Municipal Workers. He also became active in the Labour Party, serving on Chester-le-Street Rural District Council from 1927 until 1946, including a stint as chair in 1940/41. From 1934 until 1945, he also served on Durham County Council.

He was elected at the 1945 general election as member of parliament (MP) for Barnard Castle in County Durham, and held the seat until the constituency was abolished at the 1950 election.

Parliament of the United Kingdom
Preceded by Thomas Sexton	Member of Parliament for Barnard Castle; 1945 – 1950	Constituency abolished
