= Durham Miners' Association =

British trade union

- Durham Miners' Association
- Founded: 1869
- Dissolved: 2018
- Headquarters: Redhills, Durham
- Location: United Kingdom
- Members: 105,612 (1907)
- Key people: William Crawford (General Secretary and President), John Wilson (General Secretary and Treasurer), W. P. Richardson (General Secretary), Peter Lee (General Secretary), John Swan (General Secretary), Sam Watson (General Secretary and Treasurer), William House (President), James Robson (President), John Johnson (Treasurer)
- Parent organization: MNU (1869–1898); MFGB (1892–1893; 1908–1944); NUM (1945–2018)

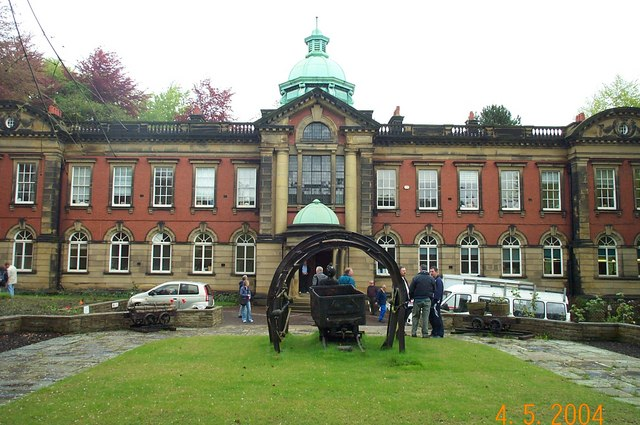
Redhills, Durham, headquarters of the Durham Miners' Association

The Durham Miners' Association (DMA) was a trade union in the United Kingdom.

== History ==
The union was founded in 1869 and its membership quickly rose to 4,000, but within a year had fallen back to 2,000. In December 1870, William Crawford became the union's president, and was able to rebuild its membership, the DMA soon becoming the largest miners' union in the UK.

The union saw rapid success, with the abolition of the unpopular Yearly Bond in 1872, while a short strike in 1874 began a process of agreeing wages across the county. A longer strike in 1879 was unsuccessful in preventing cuts to wages, but action in 1890 ensured that the district was the first in the county to adopt a standard seven-hour day. The prolonged strike of 1892 against a proposed 15% cut in wages ended with an agreement to accept a 10% cut.

In these early days, the DMA was part of the Miners' National Union, and supported Lib-Lab candidates; both Crawford and John Wilson serving local constituencies. Although the union affiliated to the Miners' Federation of Great Britain (MFGB) in 1892, it was expelled the following year after refusing to join the national strike. It again attempted to join in 1897, but asked to be bound only on questions of wages, which was not permitted. In particular, the Durham union opposed the Eight Hours Bill, which was strongly promoted by the MFGB. The union finally joined the MFGB in 1908, following the passage of the Eight Hours Bill. In addition, by 1900, membership had risen to 80,000.

While the union represented the large majority of miners in County Durham, some in specialist roles were represented by the Durham County Colliery Enginemen's Association, the Durham Colliery Mechanics' Association, and the Durham Cokemen's Association. The four unions worked together in the Durham County Mining Federation Board, the secretary of which was invariably the secretary of the DMA.

The union became the Durham Area of the National Union of Mineworkers in 1945 and later officially became the North East Area of the NUM, although it was generally known by its former name. It was dissolved in 2018.

== General Secretaries ==
1869: John Richardson
1870: A. Cairns
1871: William Crawford
1890: William Hammond Patterson
1896: John Wilson
1915: Thomas Cann
1924: W. P. Richardson
1930: Peter Lee
1935: John Swan
1945: Sam Watson
1963: Alfred Hesler
1970: J.C. (Kit) Robinson
1972: W. Malt
1979: Tom Callan
1985: David Hopper
2016: Alan Cummings
2019: Alan Mardghum

== Presidents ==
1869: William Crake
1870: William Crawford
1871: John Forman
1900: William House
1917: James Robson
1935: James Gilliland
1945: Edward Moore
1953: James Kelly
1961: Charles Pick
1967: J.C. (Kit) Robinson
1970: Walter Malt
1972: Tom Callan
1979: Harold Mitchell
1985: David Guy
2012: Alan Cummings
2016: Joseph Whitworth
2019: Alan Mardghum
2020: Stephen Guy

== Treasurers ==
1869: Nicholas Wilkinson
1882: John Wilson
1886: William Hammond Patterson
1890: John Johnson
1896: Thomas Cann
1915: Thomas Trotter
1932: Sam Watson
