= Leicestershire Miners' Association =

- Founded: 1887
- Dissolved: 24 June 2016
- Headquarters: 8 Bakewell Street, Coalville
- Location: United Kingdom
- Members: 4,724 (1907)
- Key people: Levi Lovett (President), Jack W. Smith
- Affiliations: Miners' Federation of Great Britain

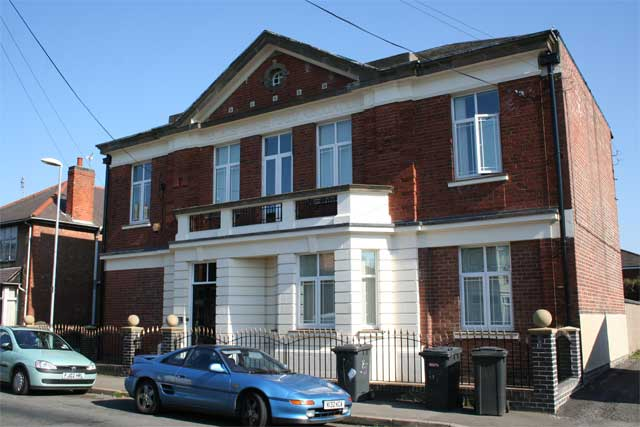
Former headquarters, in Coalville

The Leicestershire Miners' Association was a trade union in the United Kingdom.

The union was founded in 1887 as the Coalville and District Miners' Association to represent coal miners in the Coalville area of Leicestershire. In about 1907, it became the "Leicestershire Miners' Association".

The union was affiliated to the Miners Federation of Great Britain, and in 1945 it became the Leicestershire Area of the National Union of Mineworkers (NUM). Although all but thirty of the union's members broke the 1984 Miners' Strike, they voted against joining the Union of Democratic Mineworkers, and remained part of the NUM. The union was finally dissolved in 2016.

Notable figures associated with the union include president Levi Lovett and agent Jack W. Smith.

== Secretaries ==
c. 1900: Tom Gowdridge
1945: Frank Smith
1976: Jack Jones
c. 1990: Peter Smith
