= Hugh Hughes (trade unionist) =

British trade unionist

Hugh Hughes (4 November 1878 – 25 December 1932) was a British trade unionist.

Born in Hetton-le-Hole, Hughes moved to North Wales with his family in 1887, where his father Edward Hughes worked for the Point of Ayr Colliery Company and became a checkweighman. The young Hughes left school around the age of thirteen, as his father was unwell; to assist him in his job. Once his father recovered, he became a lead miner at Trelogan, then a blacksmith, before returning to Point of Ayr as a coal miner. In 1898, he moved to Wrexham with his parents, his father having become General Secretary of the Denbighshire and Flintshire Miners' Federation, again becoming a blacksmith, then moved to Liverpool to work for the Docks Board.

By 1915, the Denbighshire and Flintshire Miners' Federation had become the North Wales Miners' Association (NWMA), and Hughes was elected as its financial secretary, working once more alongside his father. He also became active in the Labour Party, and stood unsuccessfully for Wrexham at the 1918 general election, but he was elected to Denbighshire County Council in 1921. When his father died, in 1925, Hugh was elected as the new secretary of the NWMA, and served until his own death on Christmas Day 1932.

Trade union offices
Preceded by Edward Hughes	General Secretary of the North Wales Miners' Association; 1925 – 1932	Succeeded by Edward Jones
