= Beergate =

British political controversy

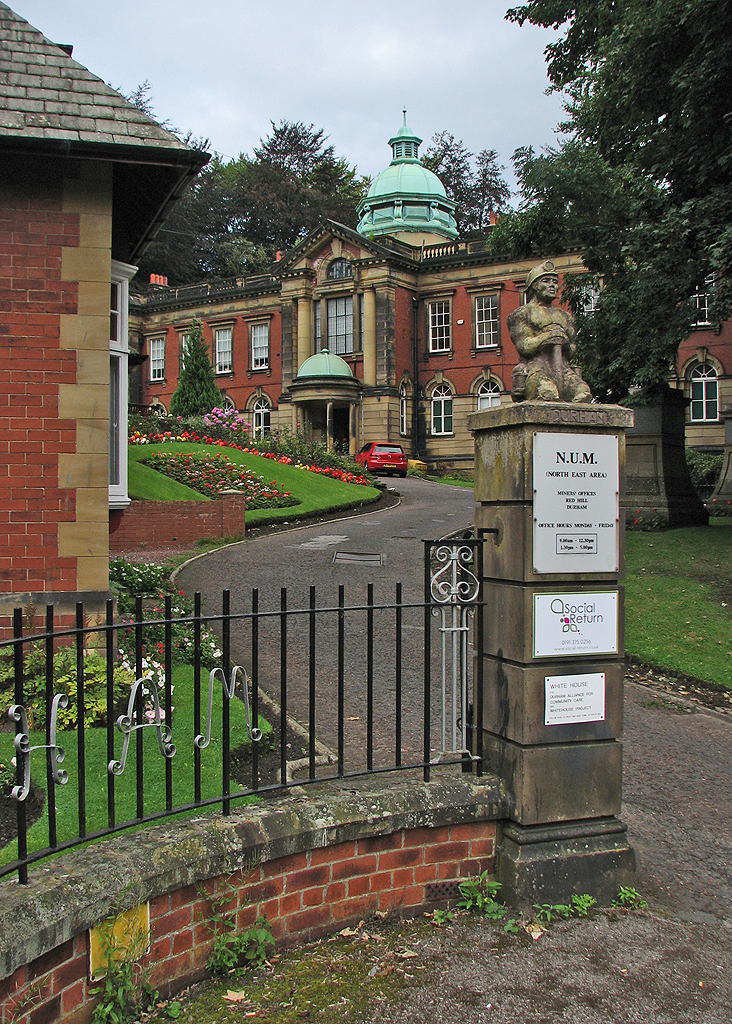
Durham Miners' Hall, where Keir Starmer and colleagues used Mary Foy's office

Beergate, or Currygate, (Note: For etymology of the "-gate" suffix, see List of -gate scandals and controversies) was a British political controversy concerning allegations that an event in Durham on 30 April 2021, attended by Labour Party leader Keir Starmer and Deputy Leader Angela Rayner, could have been in breach of COVID-19 lockdown restrictions. Labour and Starmer said, at the time and since, that the event complied with the rules for work gatherings, with a pause for food. The police, after investigating, cleared the Labour attendees, including Starmer and Rayner.

At the Durham event, shortly before the Hartlepool by-election and local elections, a Labour Party campaign team of seventeen people, including Starmer and deputy leader Angela Rayner, used the office of MP Mary Foy. Around 10 pm, a student Ivo Delingpole, took a short video through the office window of the event. Next day, The Sun published a brief story including Labour's statement that this was a permissible work event, and pictures from the video showing Starmer with a beer while others ate a takeaway. The story then got little attention.

While responding to Partygate allegations in December 2021, Prime Minister Boris Johnson referred to the Durham event. In January 2022, he apologised for attending a "socially distanced drinks" gathering, saying he had believed it was a work event. Starmer said Johnson had breached the Ministerial Code by misleading Parliament, and asked him to resign. Conservatives featured in The Daily Telegraph and the Daily Mail called Starmer a hypocrite, alleging that he had similarly breached lockdown rules. On 7 February 2022, Durham Constabulary cleared Starmer over the allegation. They had reviewed the video and did not believe an offence had been established, so would take no further action.

On 12 April 2022, after Johnson was given a fixed penalty notice (FPN) for breaching COVID-19 regulations, Starmer again said Johnson should resign. Press and Conservatives made allegations about the Durham event and demanded a detailed investigation, on 6 May Durham Constabulary said they had begun investigating as new evidence had emerged. On 9 May, Starmer and Rayner said they were confident they had not broken any rules, but would resign if issued with FPNs, to demonstrate what they said were different principles to Johnson who remained in office. On 8 July 2022, Durham Constabulary announced that all attendees, including Rayner and Starmer, had been cleared of any wrongdoing. By then, the government was in crisis, and on 7 July Johnson had announced his resignation.

== Durham event ==
On 30 April 2021, six days before the 6 May 2021 Hartlepool by-election and local elections, Keir Starmer joined campaigning in Hull, then travelled to Durham, where he was to arrive at his hotel at 6:30 pm. He walked from there to join a Labour Party campaign team in local MP Mary Foy's office premises which form part of the Durham Miners' Hall. His deputy Angela Rayner, who had been campaigning in Hartlepool, arrived shortly before 7 pm, and with their aides they took part in an online event for members, gave approval to press releases, and filmed campaign videos. Foy joined them, with about four members of her team. In total there were 17 participants at the gathering.

A Labour memo or operational note said takeaway food was to be ordered from a nearby curry house for a meal break, scheduled to be between 8:40 pm and 10 pm, and after this noted that Starmer would walk to his hotel, "End of visit". Starmer said takeaways were "brought in and at various points people went through to the kitchen, got a plate and had something to eat", then "got on with their work".

Starmer said he continued work after the meal, and Labour showed The Guardian documentation to support this. A time-stamped video showed Starmer being filmed to 9:07 pm, then WhatsApp group exchanges discussed editing the video as a International Workers' Day message. An aide who had been with Starmer sent the final edit at 1:56 am, possibly after returning to their hotel. A source said Starmer was given overnight briefing papers to prepare himself for a visit the next day to Liberty Steel in Hartlepool. During the evening, edits were made between 10:41 and 11:19 pm to a Google document script for filming there.

By that date, UK COVID-19 pandemic levels had fallen, and the lockdown regulations, first introduced in March 2020, had been eased to "step two" rules. Indoor socialising was still banned, with exceptions for events "reasonably necessary" for work purposes, and where "the gathering is reasonably necessary for the purposes of campaigning in an election". The government had also issued guidance, which for election campaigning said "You should not meet with other campaigners indoors." Restaurants were only permitted to serve food outdoors for groups of up to six people or up to two households, and indoor service was not allowed. Starmer said this was part of the reason for getting a takeaway delivered.

=== Video footage ===
External videos
- GB News has been given access to footage of Keir Starmer drinking a beer during lockdown

A 34-second video filmed through the office window shortly after 10 pm on 30 April 2021 showed Starmer and some of the group, drinking beer and eating. The footage was taken by Ivo Delingpole, a student at Durham University, and the son of the Breitbart writer James Delingpole, and who a year later said he had seen "something that I thought was an injustice and decided to film it because it made me angry".

The student's video was initially forwarded to friends, and then to anti-lockdown activists including Reclaim Party leader Laurence Fox who uploaded it to his Twitter account at 8:42 a.m. next morning, Saturday 1 May 2021.

The Sun used a picture from the video, showing Starmer with a beer, in a brief story it put online later that day. This included a Conservative statement that people would be "asking questions" about Starmer's involvement, and Labour's insistence that they had followed the rules; "Keir was in the workplace, meeting a local MP in her constituency office and participating in an online Labour Party event. They paused for dinner as the meeting was during the evening."

On 2 May 2021, the Sun on Sunday published the story on page 2 of its print edition, a placement usually used for political stories that are not expected to be widely read, and it was ignored by media until the Partygate scandal, concerning breaches of COVID-19 rules by the Conservative Prime Minister Boris Johnson and 10 Downing Street staff, developed. Throughout, Labour has consistently said that the lockdown rules at that time allowed indoor gatherings for "work purposes" and such eating and drinking was allowed if "reasonably necessary for work".

== Response to Partygate ==
The Durham event was ignored until December 2021 when Partygate media investigations led to allegations that multiple staff gatherings in 2020 and early 2021 at Downing Street as well as other government offices had breached COVID-19 lockdown restrictions (the scandal would later lead to fixed penalty notices being issued and multiple government apologies). Starmer strongly criticised Johnson for not acknowledging this rule breaking. Political correspondent Andrew Sparrow at The Guardian said it suited Conservatives defending Johnson to suggest that the single Durham event showed that "all politicians broke the rules", and they made the story a minor line of attack.

On 8 December 2021, at PMQs, after a video clip from a year earlier showed Downing Street Press Secretary Allegra Stratton laughing about lockdown parties, Starmer accused Johnson of "taking the public for fools" and doubted his "moral authority to lead". At the next PMQs, Johnson said Starmer "might explain why there are pictures of him quaffing beer—we have not heard him do so." ITV News journalist Paul Brand related this to The Sun's story about the Durham event, which had shown the photograph of Starmer with a beer in an election "booze row".

Johnson came under increasing pressure, including from Conservatives, after allegations that his Secretary Martin Reynolds had invited over a hundred staff to "socially distanced drinks". Johnson apologised at PMQs on 12 January 2022 for briefly attending the drinks party, but said he "believed implicitly that this was a work event" which "could be said technically to fall within the guidance." In reply, Starmer accused Johnson of "months of deceit" breaching the Ministerial Code which says "ministers who knowingly mislead Parliament will be expected to offer their resignation", and asked if Johnson did "not see why the British public think he is lying through his teeth?" Starmer also tweeted: "The party is over Boris Johnson. Resign".

The Daily Telegraph said on 13 January that Labour faced a "booze row": a "senior Tory" had responded to Starmer's statements by citing the Durham image showing Starmer drinking with party staff, "standing close to two other people while another pair congregated in the background." The senior Tory alleged that Starmer had "spent the past two months criticising people for doing the exact same thing he's been doing himself", and called him "an absolute hypocrite." For its 15 January 2022 front page, the Daily Mail headlined the picture from the video with "Starmer the Covid party hypocrite". Conservative MPs Andrew Bridgen and Iain Duncan Smith both accused Labour of hypocrisy, Bridgen said Starmer should refer himself and others in the photograph for investigation, Duncan Smith said Starmer should apologise. The controversy has been called "beergate" and "currygate".

== Initial police review ==
On 7 February 2022, Durham Constabulary cleared Starmer over allegedly breaking lockdown rules. They said that, after reviewing the Durham video, "We do not believe an offence has been established in relation to the legislation and guidance in place at that time and will therefore take no further action in relation to this matter."

Starmer contrasted the Durham statement with the Metropolitan Police (Met) announcement on 25 January that it was investigating alleged Partygate events only where there was evidence of a "serious and flagrant breach" of regulations, and "little ambiguity around the absence of any reasonable defence". Sue Gray's interim report released on 31 January had shown that by then the Met was investigating twelve Partygate events, including six which Johnson might have attended. Starmer said they were cases the police had found "serious enough and flagrant enough to put aside their usual rule that they won't investigate 12 months after the event."

=== Calls for further investigation ===
Referring to the Met's issuing of FPNs to Johnson, Chancellor Rishi Sunak, and others who had attended a Partygate gathering, Conservative MP Richard Holden wrote to Durham Constabulary on 22 April, saying "In light of that decision, and the tests applied by Metropolitan Police for the level of a Covid regulations brief, I believe there is a strong public interest in Durham Constabulary reviewing its decision not to investigate the Starmer incident further." He tweeted that "The rules and the way they are interpreted should apply equally" to Johnson and Starmer.

On 27 April 2022, Holden tweeted "Durham Police leave door open to re-examining as Durham Deputy Chief Constable to 'make enquiries' with investigation team against Starmer", with a copy of the police letter stating "I will make inquiries with the investigation team and will update you at the point at which I have been able to conclude those inquiries." Labour said Holden had wrongly characterised the letter, the police stated "As a courtesy, we have replied to Mr Holden to confirm we have received that letter and will consider its contents before responding in due course." Holden's letter contained two claims, the first being a Facebook invitation to a quiz night on the date Starmer was filmed, implying it referred to an in-person event. The second was a Facebook message from Labour MP Mary Foy encouraging members to have a "greasy night", which Holden claimed was slang for 'drinking too much'. Sheila Williams, chair of the City of Durham Labour party, responded that "greasy" was "clearly a typographical error" in place of "great", as already pointed out in the Facebook thread, while the invitation to the quiz made it clear a Zoom link would follow, and Labour said Starmer was not involved.

Labour had said that Rayner was not present at the Durham meal, but later acknowledged she had been there, and their initial statement had been a mistake. Starmer said to reporters, "Whether Angela Rayner was there or not makes absolutely no difference. There was no breach of the rules, the matter's already been looked into" and that, shortly before local elections, "Conservative MPs are trying to throw as much mud as possible". He contrasted this with over 50 FPNs already issued to Downing Street by then.

Labour's explanation was disputed on 1 May by the culture secretary, Nadine Dorries, who tweeted, "No reasonable person believes Labour's story, so why do Durham police and what were they told?". She also retweeted a Daily Mail story that included a photo of Starmer eating curry taken before the pandemic. indy100 reported accusations that she had shared "fake news" and that the Daily Mail had cropped the image from a photo of Starmer and Frank Dobson, who died in 2019. SNP MP John Nicolson and Labour MP Chris Bryant said that Dorries, as the cabinet secretary responsible for tackling disinformation, should take it down, but Dorries ignored those requests and disclaimed any responsibility for photos in the article she had linked.

On 3 May 2022, The National said that Conservatives were centring attention on "beergate" to divert attention from the scandals about Johnson's activities. The Evening Standard said that Cabinet ministers Dorries, Anne-Marie Trevelyan, Grant Shapps, and Ben Wallace had increased pressure on Durham police to reopen their investigation.

Starmer was interviewed on Good Morning Britain by Richard Madeley and Susanna Reid, on the morning of 4 May 2022. Starmer said that a takeaway had been ordered, after he had been doing "pieces to camera", "clearing documents" and "preparing for the next day" of campaigning. He said that restaurants and pubs were closed, and takeaways "were really the only way you could eat", he and others had picked up a plate of food from the kitchen and "got on with the work". It would be wrong, he said, to describe anything that happened as socialising. The Times said later it had been told by Labour sources that Starmer had the beer at 10 pm because of a delay due to the takeaway being delivered an hour late.

On 4 May The Financial Times reported Labour concerns that the "beergate" allegations were offsetting the effect public anger about partygate was having on the local elections.

== Police investigation ==
=== Start of investigation ===
On Thursday 5 May 2022, the day of the 2022 local elections, Starmer said he had not had any contact from Durham Constabulary. When the purdah period on the elections ended on Friday 6 May, Durham police stated that, "following the receipt of significant new information over recent days", an investigation "into potential breaches of Covid-19 regulations relating to this gathering" was being conducted. Durham police did not indicate how this compared to the stringent thresholds the Met had set for opening investigations into allegations.

The Guardian said that day that "the news is deeply uncomfortable for the party leader, who had called for Boris Johnson to resign when he was investigated for a breach of the law". In an interview with Sky News, Starmer said, "We were working in the office, we stopped for something to eat. No party, no breach of the rules," and, "The police have obviously got their job to do, we should let them get on it. But I'm confident that no rules were broken."

On Saturday 7 May Diane Abbott, who was Shadow Home Secretary under the previous Labour leader, Jeremy Corbyn, expressed her view that Starmer should "consider his position" if he were to receive an FPN from the police, but did not believe that he would get one.

Conservatives accused Starmer of hypocrisy for not resigning when the police reopened their investigation. Conservative whips told their MPs not to call for Starmer's resignation, as that would increase the pressure on Johnson. Education Secretary Nadhim Zahawi said, "I do think, though, that the public will be uncomfortable with the hypocrisy. I think he's used one in three of his PMQs to talk about parties instead of focusing on the cost of living. He has tweeted himself saying that if you're under investigation, a criminal investigation, then you should resign." This referred to Starmer's tweet posted on 31 January. The deputy prime minister, Dominic Raab, characterised Starmer's actions as "rank double standards", but did not call for Starmer to resign. On GB News, Government minister Jacob Rees-Mogg said on 8 May that Starmer should not resign if he received an FPN for 'Beergate', categorising it as being equivalent to one for 'Partygate', which he described as "fluff".

On 8 May Damian Grammaticas, the BBC News political correspondent, said that, rather than being on Labour gains and Conservative losses in the May local elections, the political focus was on Starmer as he waited for the police to complete their enquiries. There have been claims that the police decision to reopen the investigation of Labour party members, announced the day after the May 2022 local elections, "robbed them of the chance to herald Labour's progress".

=== New allegations ===
An apparently leaked Labour Party document, published by The Mail on Sunday, showed the schedule outlining plans for Starmer's trip to Durham including the takeaway planned in advance for between 8:40 pm and 10 pm. The document included a reminder to "arrange takeaway from Spice Lounge", a local Indian restaurant, as Starmer's last work activity of the day, and the meal reportedly arrived late. Rayner was also planned to be in attendance. The Radisson Blu Hotel, the building where Starmer's team was staying, served food on its outdoor terrace until 9 pm. The barrister Adam Wagner, a specialist in lockdown rules, told The Guardian that he could not see how it could be a breach of the regulations, which allowed for any gathering that was reasonably necessary for work or voluntary activity, and the document showed that the event was pre-planned for a political purpose, unlike the multiple Partygate events investigated as they obviously had a social purpose.

On 8 May 2022, The Times reported that an unnamed source, who was present at the gathering, said that Starmer did not return to work afterwards and that Foy and her staff were there to socialise, not to work. Politico reported, on the morning of 9 May, that an unnamed source "familiar with what happened that night" said that some junior staffers at the event were drunk "and obviously weren't working so I remember thinking: why are they here?" The same source also said that when the curry arrived late there was no longer any work being done, and they were not aware of any work being done afterwards, saying, "It was Friday night after nine o'clock and some people were drinking ... Of course it crossed the line." Later that morning, Foy issued a statement saying, "These allegations about my staff are untrue ... I have already said that I and my team were working during a very busy period, including facilitating the leader's visit. I do not believe either I or my office staff broke any rules." The Guardian reported, on 15 May, that at least one witness had expressed certainty that Starmer had not continued working in the hall after the meal.

=== Starmer's and Rayner's resignation pledges ===
On the evening of 9 May 2022, Starmer announced that he would resign as leader of the opposition if he were to receive an FPN for a breach of COVID-19 regulations. Rayner also said that she would resign if she were to receive an FPN. Starmer stated his intent to demonstrate "different principles to the prime minister" (who had already been given an FPN for a breach at Downing Street), and said, "The idea that I would casually break the rules is wrong. I don't think those who are accusing me of it believe it themselves ... They are trying to say all politicians are the same." He stated, "If the police decide to issue me with an FPN, I would of course do the right thing and step down", adding, "The British public deserve politicians who think the rules apply to them."

Replying to a media question about the possibility that the police might say there could have been a breach of rules but not issue an FPN, he said, "The penalty for a Covid breach is a fixed-penalty notice. That's a matter of law. And I've set out what the position is in relation to that."

The political editor of The Observer reported that Starmer had sought four different legal opinions, which gave him confidence he would be cleared in the investigation.

=== Responses to pledges ===
Conservative MPs Michael Fabricant and Chris Philp accused Starmer's FPN statement of attempting to pressure the police into clearing him. In its 10 May edition, the Daily Mail said Starmer's pledge to resign if issued a penalty "placed detectives in the difficult position" given the potential political implications of their decision, with one government source suggesting Durham Constabulary could be under "undue pressure" to clear Starmer or refrain from fining him. Its position was described by The Guardian as inconsistent, noting that the editorial comment in the Daily Mail said "Superficially of course, he appears to be doing the decent thing, though frankly, he didn't have much choice." In previous articles it had urged the police to investigate, and had said this would make Starmer's position untenable.

The Times said national guidance and police practice of increasingly clamping down on offenders meant increased pressure on police to issue Starmer with an FPN if they found he had breached regulations. It said some of Starmer's supporters assumed that Durham police would be reluctant to give him an FPN because in May 2021 they had concluded that Dominic Cummings might have committed a minor breach of lockdown rules at Barnard Castle but that no action would be taken. A source told The Times that the Durham police would be aware of potential fallout if they appeared to be treating Starmer more leniently than the Met had treated Johnson.

Policing minister Kit Malthouse said Durham police would "operate professionally to the high standards we expect of them", irrespective of any alleged pressure. Crossbench peer Ken Macdonald, Starmer's predecessor as director of public prosecutions, said from his experience the police would ignore such pressure, and if anything focus more strongly on deciding for themselves.

The Observer reported on 14 May that in the week after Starmer announced he might resign, some potential replacement candidates had begun preparing for a possible leadership campaign. On 19 May The Independent compared Partygate developments to "the much flimsier 'beergate' allegations.".

=== Police questionnaires ===
Starmer and Rayner received police questionnaires on 31 May. On 2 June, The Times reported that the questionnaires were "comprehensive" and included multiple questions about the presentation of a football shirt to Starmer on Friday 30 April 2021. On 2 May 2021, North West Durham Labour had posted a picture on Twitter with a tweet saying "interrupted Keir Starmer while he was hard at work [on Friday] to proudly show him our Consett AFC strip ahead of their historic FA Vase final". It showed Starmer in Foy's office, holding a replica Consett A.F.C. jersey, a local non-league team which was to play in the May 2021 FA Vase final at Wembley Stadium. In May 2022, Labour said "As this tweet clearly shows, Keir Starmer was working. No rules were broken."

Starmer and Rayner returned their completed questionnaires to Durham police on 17 June.

=== Outcome ===
On Friday 8 July 2022, Starmer and Rayner were cleared by Durham Police, who issued a statement:

Following the emergence of significant new information, an investigation was launched by Durham constabulary into a gathering at the Miners' Hall, in Redhills, Durham on 30 April 2021. That investigation has now concluded.

A substantial amount of documentary and witness evidence was obtained which identified the 17 participants and their activities during that gathering. Following the application of the evidential full code test, it has been concluded that there is no case to answer for a contravention of the regulations, due to the application of an exception, namely reasonably necessary work.
Accordingly, Durham constabulary will not be issuing any fixed penalty notices in respect of the gathering and no further action will be taken. The investigation has been thorough, detailed and proportionate.
The final evidence supplied by participants from the local constituency was returned to Durham police on 5 July and analysed by investigators against all the evidence before the investigation was concluded on 8 July 2022.

In line with established national policing guidelines, we will not name or otherwise identify any of those present at the gathering, all of whom have been informed of the investigation outcome by their legal representatives.

=== Responses to the outcome ===
A spokesperson for the Labour Party said: "Keir Starmer and Angela Rayner have always been clear that no rules were broken in Durham. The police have completed their investigation and have agreed, saying that there is no case to answer." In a statement on Twitter, Keir Starmer said: "I've always said no rules were broken when I was in Durham. The police have completed their investigation and agreed: there is no case to answer. For me, this was always a matter of principle. Honesty and integrity matter. You will always get that from me."

Angela Rayner said: "The contrast with the behaviour of this disgraced prime minister couldn't be clearer." After saying she was delighted, Mary Foy added that it was "unfortunate that the desire of some Conservative politicians has led to so much of Durham Police's time being focused on a matter that was already investigated, especially when their resources are already under significant pressure". At a press conference, Starmer drew a contrast with a "Tory party, which is tearing itself apart with a cast list of wannabe leaders, they've all propped up this Prime Minister for months and months and months knowing he's unfit for office", and called for a general election.

Michael Barton, former chief constable of Durham Constabulary, said: "It had all the hallmarks of a political smear campaign, not a fair and justified criminal investigation", and had "taken experienced detectives away from proper police work."

The Guardian praised "stickler for the rules" Starmer for his promise to resign if he was fined and the outcome of the investigation created an "exoneration" for Starmer.

== Related developments ==
The Met concluded its Partygate investigation on 19 May 2022, and announced that no further FPNs would be given to Johnson. This left Starmer still awaiting the Durham police decision. He repeated that Johnson should resign "after an investigation that shows 120-plus breaches of the law in Downing Street". Rayner said, "Johnson's Downing Street broke the rules at record-breaking scale. Britain deserves better."

In the Commons debate when the final Sue Gray report into Partygate was released on 25 May 2022, Starmer stated he had "not broken any rules, and any attempt to compare a perfectly legal takeaway while working to this catalogue of criminality looks even more ridiculous today, but if the police decide otherwise, I will do the decent thing and step down. The public need to know that not all politicians are the same—that not all politicians put themselves above their country—and that honesty, integrity and accountability matter." Johnson had just said he had been "humbled" by the findings, but now derided Starmer as "sanctimonious", calling him "Sir Beer Korma", claimed to have apologised, and said "it would now be sensible for him, too, to apologise, so that we can all collectively move on." Other Conservatives also referred to the Durham investigation.

Partygate contributed to a growing government crisis, on 7 July Johnson announced his resignation as party leader and Prime Minister.

== See also ==
- Partygate
- Political impact of the COVID-19 pandemic
