= North Wales Miners' Association =

Trade union in Wales

The North Wales Miners' Association was a trade union representing coal miners in Wales.

== History ==
The origins of the union lay in the North Wales District Meeting, a monthly meeting in Wrexham of representatives of workers from about sixteen collieries. In November 1889, the representatives decided to form the North Wales Miners' Federation, and by mid-1890 this included branches at 25 collieries, with a total of 7,793 members. It was noted that about 6,000 of these were members of the Miners' Federation of Great Britain (MFGB), and soon the whole organisation affiliated. In 1891, the union elected Ioan Williams as its full-time agent.

In 1894, the North Wales Quarrymen's Union affiliated to the association, increasing its membership by 13,000, although they soon left again. In 1900, the union decided to increase its membership dues, and this led a group of miners in Rhosllanerchrugog and Ruabon, led by Thomas Hughes, to break away as the Rhos Miners' Union. The remainder of the union adopted the name Denbighshire and Flintshire Miners' Federation. The Ruabon miners rejoined the following year, and this led the remaining members of the Rhos Miners' Union to dissolve the organisation and rejoin the North Wales Miners.

In 1903, the union was renamed as the "North Wales Miners' Association", while in 1935 it became the North Wales and Border Counties Mineworkers' Association. Never a large organisation – the Association had only 7,500 members in 1945 - from about 1900, its General Secretary also served as its Agent, and even that post was left vacant from 1932 until 1934. Ted Jones was appointed shortly before the Gresford disaster.

In 1945, the MFGB became the National Union of Mineworkers, and the Association became its North Wales Area, with less autonomy than before.

By the time of the 1984–85 strike, the region had only two pits operating. Its then Secretary, Ted McKay, opposed the strike, but the Bersham Colliery was heavily picketed by miners from other areas and did not work until November 1984.

The Area was dissolved in 2011.

== Leadership ==
=== Secretaries ===
1889: Richard Jones
1892: I. L. Thomas
1893: S. Roberts
1893: Edward Hughes
1925: Hugh Hughes
1934: Ted Jones
1961: Jos Ellis
1975: Ted McKay
1987: Les Kelly
2005: Rosemarie Williams

=== Presidents ===
1889: David Griffiths
1891: William Davies
1892: George Rowley
1894: Thomas Hughes
1894: George Rowley
1896: Thomas Hughes
1897: Robert Jones
1899: George Rowley
1902: John Williams
1905: Tom Hughes
1913: Thomas Rowland

== Bibliography ==
- Keith Gildart, North Wales Miners: A Fragile Unity, 1945–1996
- Ted McKay, Edward Hughes and the History of Coal Mining in North Wales
