= South Derbyshire Miners' Association =

English trade union

- Merged into: Union of Democratic Mineworkers
- Founded: 1888
- Dissolved: 6 December 1985
- Headquarters: Weston Street, Swadlincote
- Location: United Kingdom
- Parent organization: Miners' Federation of Great Britain (1888–1944); National Union of Mineworkers (1945–1985)

The South Derbyshire Miners' Association was a trade union representing coal miners in the Derbyshire area of England.

An earlier Derbyshire and Nottinghamshire Miners' Association had been founded in the 1860s, but became moribund by the end of the decade. Remaining members in south Derbyshire split away to form their own district of the Miners' National Union.

This union was founded in 1888, and was originally known as the South Derbyshire Amalgamated Miners' Association. By the following year, it had 2,140 members, although this fell to only 1,408 in 1898. Thereafter, it gradually rebuilt membership, which peaked at more than 6,000 in the 1920s.

In 1889, the union was a founder constituent of the Miners' Federation of Great Britain. In 1945, this became the National Union of Mineworkers (NUM), and the union became its South Derbyshire Area, with less autonomy than before.

In 1985, the South Derbyshire Area split away from the NUM, to become a founder constituent of the new Union of Democratic Mineworkers.

== General Secretaries ==
- 1888: William Buckley
- 1923: William Knight Smith
- 1928: Herbert Buck
- c. 1950: Harry Wileman
- 1965: Ken Toon
