= Thomas Cann =

British trade unionist

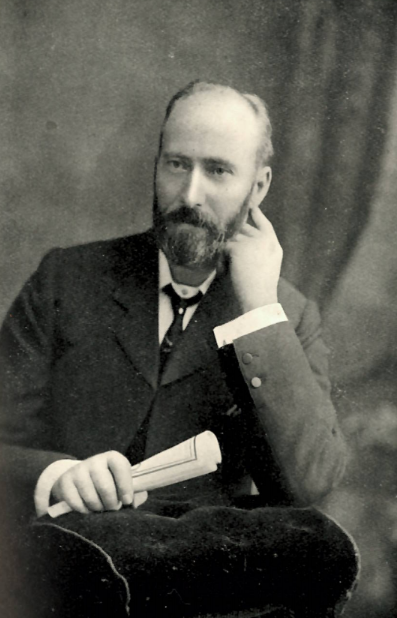
Cann in the 1900s

Thomas Henry Cann (14 June 1858–6 May 1924), often known as T. H. Cann, was a British trade unionist.

Cann was born in Cornwall, where he became a tin miner. In search of work, he moved to Brotton in Yorkshire, where he mined ironstone, then to Michigan. However, he was concerned at the dangerous conditions there, and returned to Brotton, where he worked until the mine closed. He then moved to the Handen Hold Colliery.

During his time at Handen Hold, Cann became an active trade unionist, and became well-known after opposing attempted intimidation at the Castle Eden Colliery. This led to his election to the executive of the Durham Miners' Association, and in 1896, he became its treasurer. He was also elected as an agent, and in 1915, he became the union's general secretary. He died in 1924 aged 65, still in office.

Trade union offices
Preceded by John Johnson	Treasurer of the Durham Miners' Association; 1896–1915	Succeeded by Thomas Trotter
Preceded by John Wilson	General Secretary of the Durham Miners' Association; 1915–1924	Succeeded by William Pallister Richardson
