= National Union of Cokemen and By-product Workers =

Former trade union of the United Kingdom

- Founded: 1916
- Dissolved: 2022
- Headquarters: Mountain Ash, Glamorgan
- Location: United Kingdom
- Members: 10 (2014)
- Key people: Idwal Morgan, Secretary
- Affiliations: National Union of Mineworkers
- Website: www.num.org.uk

The National Union of Cokemen and By-product Workers was a trade union representing workers involved in turning coal into coke at collieries in Great Britain.

The union's origins lay in the "National Cokemen and Surface Workers' Union", which was formed by the merger of the Yorkshire and Derbyshire Cokemen and Labourers Union, and the Lancashire Cokemen and Labourers and Local Railway Servants Union in 1911. It originally had 1,225 members, but this rose quickly to reach 2,382 in 1915. In 1916, it merged with the Durham Cokemen and Labourers' Union, to form the "National Union of Cokemen and By-product Workers".

The union affiliated to the Miners' Federation of Great Britain in 1919. This was reformed as the National Union of Mineworkers in 1945, and the National Union of Cokemen became its Cokemen's Area, with less autonomy than before.

The union was still in existence in 2014, by which time it had just ten members remaining. It was finally dissolved in 2022.

== Secretaries ==
1916: James Ogg
1933: Charles Thompson
1946: N. Barker
1960s:
1970s: Harry Close
1980s: Idwal Morgan
