= Peter Lee (trade unionist) =

British trade unionist (1864–1935)

Peter Lee (1864–1935) was a miner's leader, county councillor and Methodist local preacher, born in Trimdon Grange, County Durham. He started working in a colliery at the age of ten. He became the chairman of England's first Labour county council at Durham in 1919. He also served as general secretary and then president of the MFGB. The new town of Peterlee was named after him.

== Biography ==
Peter Lee was born at Duff Heap Row, Fivehouses, Trimdon Grange, in July 1864, into a poor, but close-knit, family. Just ten years later, he was working ten-hour days at Littletown Colliery, Pittington, for a few pence a week, and by 21 he was a veteran of 15 pits.

His life, however, was not all work. He also had an enquiring mind and a love of books, inspired by his mother's regular reading sessions to the family. As he could not read himself, he took the brave step at the age of 20 to return to the classroom, to learn the basics from the beginning. He then headed for America in 1886 to improve himself still further, working in the mines of Ohio, Pennsylvania and Kentucky for two years.

After returning to England in 1888, Lee began work at Wingate pit, where he was elected as delegate to the Miners Conference. He was then elected as checkweighman at Wingate four years later, but gave up the role to travel to South Africa in 1896. He returned a changed man. Lee became a committed Christian following his travels and, although he continued to work down the mines, he also studied and preached in local Methodist chapels.

In 1900, at the age of 33, he returned to Wheatley Hill Colliery, where he became the checkweighman, and also stood for the parish council. His council duties involved responsibility for sanitation and water purity within the village, as well as the creation of new roads and a cemetery. He went on to be elected as chairman of the council, as well as chairman of the local Co-operative and chairman of Durham County Water Board.

By 1909, Lee was a member of Durham County Council and, ten years later, he was elected as the chairman of the authority. Despite his many responsibilities, he also found time to serve as the agent of Durham Miners Association and President of the Miners’ Federation of Great Britain.

== Death and legacy ==
Although Peter Lee died in 1935, some years before the town of Peterlee was created, his name lives on both in the town and in Peter Lee Methodist Church. The Right Honourable Lord Lawson, the Lord Lieutenant of County Durham, paid tribute to Peter Lee in a souvenir brochure produced for the church in the 1950s, saying: “Peter Lee was a living witness to the power of religion in the life of a man, and he gave ample testimony to it. He gave all, asking nothing in return, little dreaming that a great New Town would bear his name.”

Peter Lee is buried in the cemetery in Wheatley Hill, which is also home to the Heritage Centre that celebrates his life.

Trade union offices
Preceded by W. P. Richardson	General Secretary of the Durham Miners' Association; 1930–1935	Succeeded by John Swan
Preceded by Ebby Edwards	Vice-President of the Miners' Federation of Great Britain; 1931–1932	Succeeded by Joseph Jones
Preceded by Ebby Edwards	President of the Miners' Federation of Great Britain; 1932–1933	Succeeded by Joseph Jones
