= Patrick Lyon =

Patrick Lyon may refer to:

== Clan Lyon (Scotland) ==
- Patrick Lyon, 1st Lord Glamis (1402–1459), Scottish nobleman
- Patrick Lyon, 1st Earl of Kinghorne (c. 1575–1615), great-great-great-great-grandson of the above
- Patrick Lyon, 3rd Earl of Strathmore and Kinghorne (1643–1695), grandson of the above
- Patrick Lyon of Auchterhouse (1669–1715), Scottish politician, son of the above
- Patrick Bowes-Lyon (tennis) (1863–1946), British tennis player and barrister, great-uncle of Queen Elizabeth II
- Patrick Bowes-Lyon, 15th Earl of Strathmore and Kinghorne (1884–1949), British nobleman, nephew of the above and uncle of Queen Elizabeth II

== Other people ==
- Patrick Lyon (blacksmith) (c. 1769–1829), Scottish-born American blacksmith and builder of hand-pumped fire engines

== See also ==
- Patrick Lyons (disambiguation)
