= Pat Lyons (academic) =

Patrick Martin (Pat) Lyons
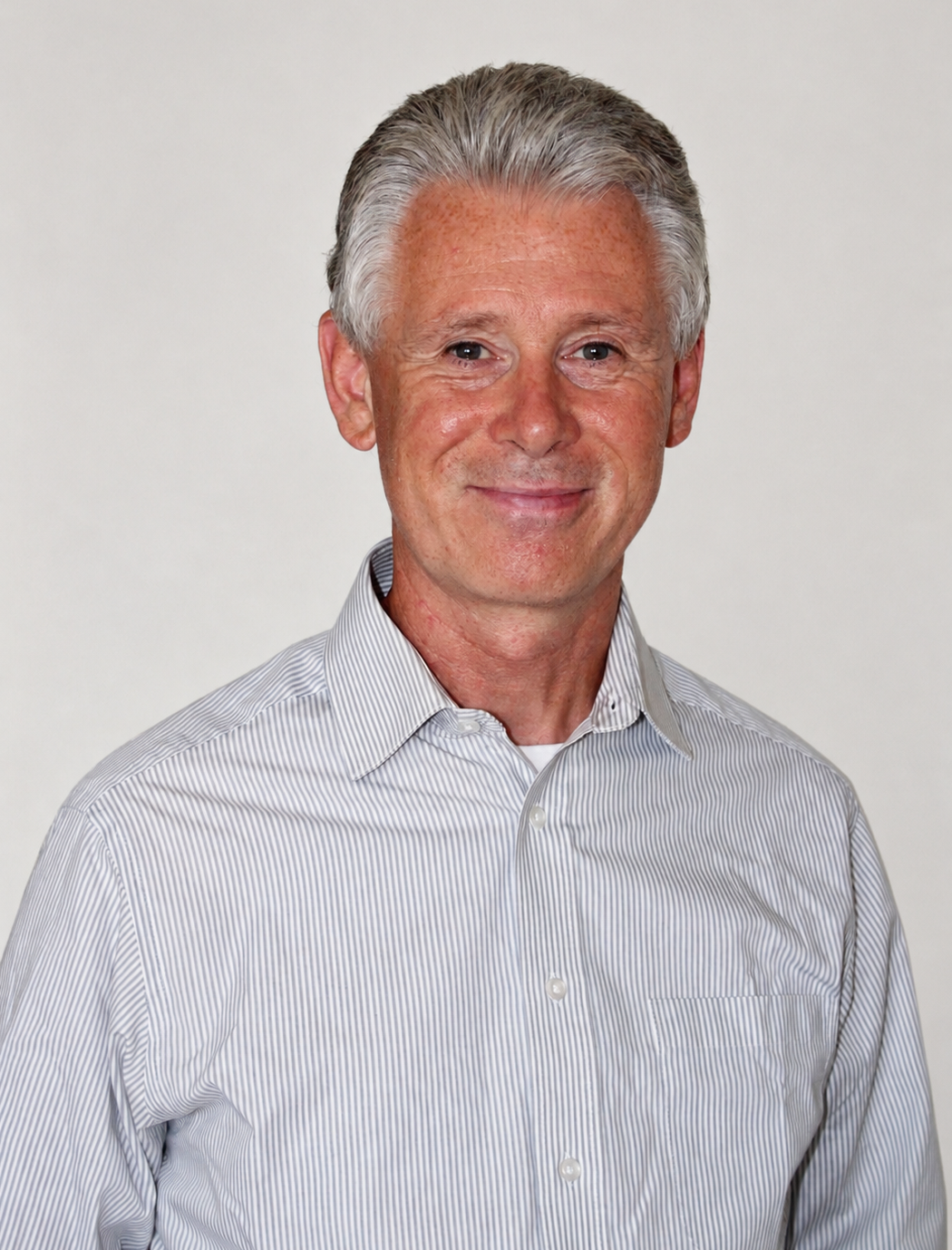
- Pat Lyons in 2026
- Born: April 30, 1969 (age 57); Thurles, Co. Tipperary, Ireland
- Spouse: Rita Lyons Kindlerová

Academic background
- Education: National University of Ireland, Maynooth; University of Limerick; Trinity College Dublin

Academic work
- Discipline: Social scientist
- Main interests: Political science, Sociology, Social psychology, History, Statistics

Patrick Martin (Pat) Lyons (born 30 April 1969) is an Irish social scientist based in the Czech Republic. He holds the title of Research Professor (DSc.) from the Czech Academy of Sciences. His research focuses on political attitudes, public opinion, political knowledge, voting behaviour, and citizenship in the Czech Republic and in comparative perspective.

== Education ==
Lyons studied at the National University of Ireland, Maynooth, earning a Bachelor of Arts in Sociology and History in 1993. He went on to complete a Master of Arts in European Integration at the University of Limerick in 1995. He subsequently undertook postgraduate studies at Trinity College Dublin, University of Dublin, receiving a Postgraduate Diploma in Statistics in 1999 and a PhD in Political Science in 2006. In 2019, he was awarded a Doctor of Science (DSc.) degree in Social and Human Sciences (Sociology) by the Czech Academy of Sciences, a title whose official English translation is ‘Research Professor’.

== Career ==
Lyons began his academic career as a research fellow at the Geary Institute for Public Policy, University College Dublin, from 2000 to 2003. He then moved to Prague, Czech Republic, where he served as a research fellow in the Department of European Studies at the Institute of International Relations, Faculty of Social Sciences, Charles University, from 2003 to 2005. Thereafter, Lyons worked from 2005 to 2026 as a researcher at the Institute of Sociology of the Czech Academy of Sciences. Over the course of his career in the Czech Republic, he has led or contributed to numerous nationally and internationally funded research projects.

== Works ==
Books:

- Lyons, P. 2017. Political Knowledge in the Czech Republic. Prague: Prague: The Institute of Sociology of the Czech Academy of Sciences. (490 pages). ISBN 978-80-7330-296-2
- Lyons, P. and R. Kindlerová (eds.). 2016. Contemporary Czech Society. Prague: The Institute of Sociology of the Czech Academy of Sciences. (552 pages). ISBN 978-80-7330-299-3 Sample chapter available from https://tinyurl.com/3h8zs9u6
- Lyons, P., and R. Kindlerová (eds.). 2015. 47 odstínů české společnosti. Praha: Sociologický ústav AV ČR, v.v.i. 369 s. ISBN 978-80-7330-280-1
- Lyons, P. and L. Linek. 2013. Dočasná stabilita? Volební podpora politických stran v České republice v letech 1990–2010. Praha: Sociologické nakladatelství Slon. 222 s. ISBN 978-80-7419-160-2
- Lyons, P. 2013. Adjectives of Democracy. Citizenship and Political Attitudes under Socialist and Liberal Democratic Systems of Governance. Praha: Slon (470 pages). ISBN 978-80-7419-144-2
- Lyons, P. 2012. Data, Theory and Analysis. Prague: Institute of Sociology, Academy of Sciences of the Czech Republic (367 pages). ISBN 978-80-7330-219-1 Available online at: https://tinyurl.com/bdedpydd
- Lyons, P. 2009. Mass and Elite Attitudes during the Prague Spring Era: Importance and Legacy. Prague: Institute of Sociology, Academy of Sciences of the Czech Republic (374 pages). ISBN 978-80-7330-174-3 Available online at: https://tinyurl.com/49j24bt4
- Lyons, P. 2008. Public Opinion, Politics and Society in Contemporary Ireland. Boulder, Colorado: Irish Academic Press / Taylor Francis Ltd (288 pages). ISBN 978-0-7165-2942-2
- Lebeda, T., L. Linek, P. Lyons and K. Vlachová et al. 2007. Voliči a volby 2006. Praha: Sociologický ústav AV ČR, v.v.i. 234 s. ISBN 978-80-7330-126-2

Articles:

- Lyons, P. 2025. Use of simulation to explore a ‘replication contradiction’: the case of leader trait measurement. Quality & Quantity, doi:10.1007/s11135-025-02426-x Online appendix containing modelling scripts, etc. available at https://osf.io/vp97q/
- Lyons, P. and P. Lupač (2025). First steps in the development of a multilevel model of resilience for the Czech Attitude Barometer Panel Survey (2024–2027). Acta Universitatis Carolinae: Philosophica et Historica (Aug. 2025). 2022(2): 45–61. https://doi.org/10.14712/24647055.2025.10
- Kudrnáč, A. and P. Lyons. 2018a. Political inequality among Czech youth: How do classroom discussions foster a sense of internal political efficacy. Young, 26(5): 484–504. doi: 10.1177/110330881773
- Kudrnáč, A. and P. Lyons. 2018b. Can political inequality be reduced in the classroom? Testing the compensation hypothesis and the BFLPE on youth civic competence. School Effectiveness and School Improvement, 29(2): 204–224. doi:10.1080/09243453.2017.1400444
- Lyons, P. and A. Kudrnáč. 2018c. Was life good in communist Czechoslovakia? An empirical test of Halbwachs’s theory of collective memory. Sociológia, 50(3): 289–310.
- Kudrnáč, A. and P. Lyons. 2017. Attitude towards voting turnout: Parental example as a motivation? Political Studies, 65(1S): 43–63. doi:10.1177/0032321716644614
- Lyons, P. 2013. Impact of salience on differential trust across political institutions in the Czech Republic. Czech Sociological Review, 49(3): 347–374. doi:10.13060/00380288.2013.49.3.01
- Lyons, P. and A. Bernardyová. 2011a. Satisfied, sceptical or simply indifferent? Current public opinion toward the fall of communism in the Czech Republic. Europe-Asia Studies, 63(9): 1719–1744. doi:10.1080/09668136.2011.611655
- Linek, L. and P. Lyons. 2011b. Representative versus responsible government and May’s Law: The case of the Czech Christian Democratic Party. Czech Sociological Review, 47(6): 1149–1190. doi:10.13060/00380288.2011.47.6.03
- Lyons, P. and L. Linek. 2010. Party system nationalization and non-uniform vote switching: Evidence from the Czech Republic. Czech Sociological Review, 46(3): 375–399. doi:10.13060/00380288.2010.46.3.03
- Lyons, P. and T. Lacina. 2009. An examination of legislative roll-call voting in the Czech Republic using spatial models. Czech Sociological Review, 45(6): 1155–1190. doi:10.13060/00380288.2009.45.6.01
- Lyons, P. 2007. It’s the economy, stupid. Popular support for EU accession in the Czech Republic. Czech Sociological Review, 43(3): 523–560. doi:10.13060/00380288.2007.43.3.02
- Kennedy, F., P. Lyons and P. Fitzgerald. 2006. Pragmatists, ideologues and the general law of curvilinear disparity: The case of the Irish Labour Party. Political Studies, 54(4): 909–911. doi:10.1111/j.1467-9248.2006.00630.x
- Lyons, P., F. Kennedy and P. Fitzgerald. 2005. The members of Labour: Backgrounds, political views and attitudes towards coalition government and the party system. Irish Political Studies, 20(2): 171–186. doi:10.1080/07907180500135438
- Franklin, M.N., P. Lyons and M. Marsh. 2004a. The generational basis of turnout decline in established democracies. Acta Politica, 39(3): 115–151. doi:10.1057/palgrave.ap.5500060
- Fitzgerald, P., F. Kennedy, and P. Lyons. 2004b. Results of a leadership election survey of party members – the 2002 Irish Labour Party leadership election. Journal of Elections Public Opinion & Parties, 14(1): 230–244. doi:10.1080/1368988042000258853
