= Durham Miners' Hall =

Redhills
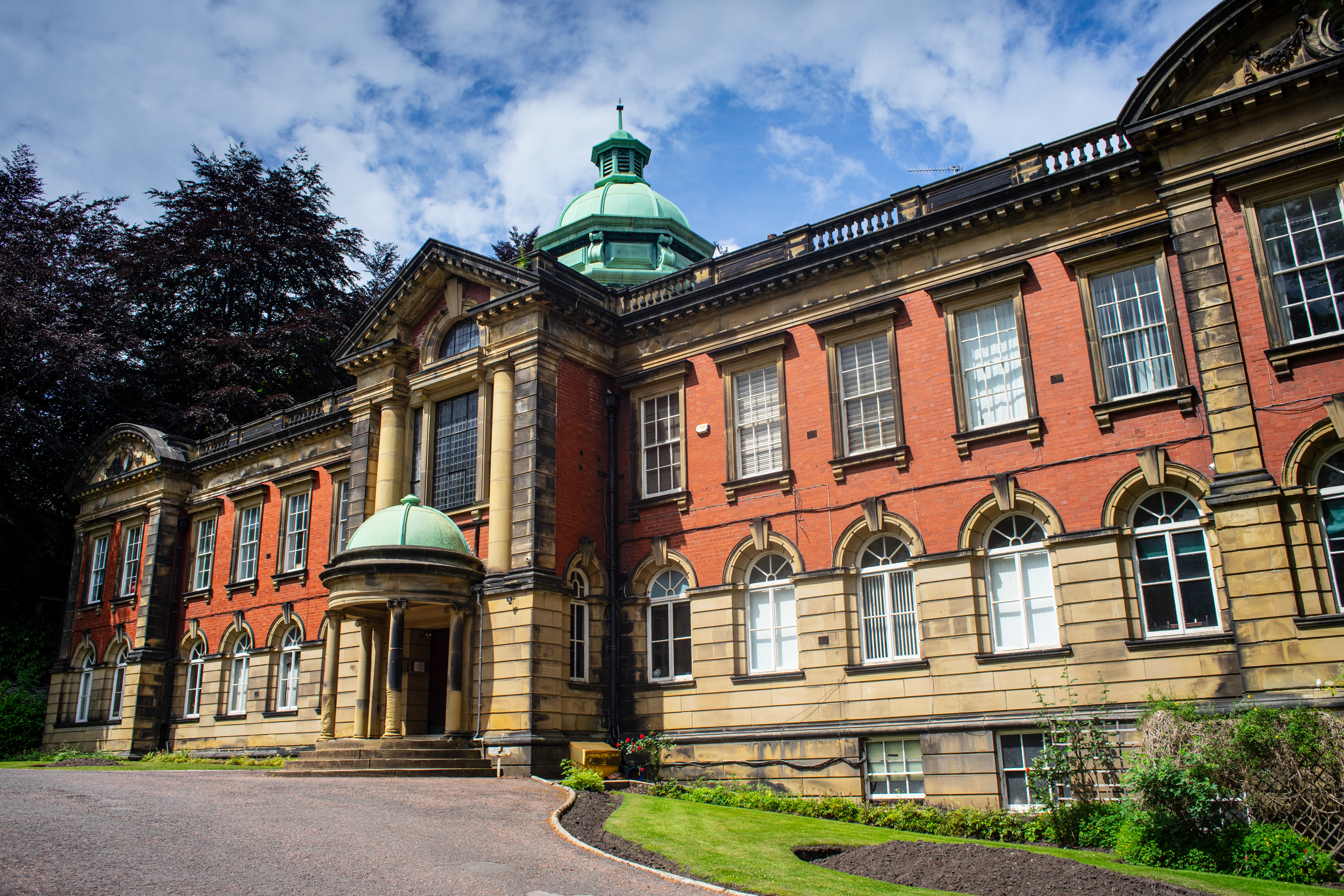
- Interactive map of the Redhills area

General information
- Architectural style: Edwardian Baroque
- Location: Redhills Lane, Durham, England
- Coordinates: 54.7773°N 1.5877°W
- Inaugurated: 1915
- Client: Durham Miners' Association

Design and construction
- Architect: H. T. Gradon

Redhills is the Grade II listed headquarters building of the Durham Miners' Association (DMA) in Durham, England. Officially called Miners' New Hall, it is known as Redhills from its location on Redhills Lane in the City of Durham.

Redhills was designed by H. T. Gradon in Edwardian Baroque style and opened in 1915 to replace the former Miners' Hall building in North Road. Its debating chamber, made with Austrian oak in the style of a Methodist chapel, was known as the "Pitman's Parliament" and was featured in Historic England's 100 Places: Power, Protest & progress list.

The main building housed the office of local Labour MP Mary Foy after her election in 2019. In May 2022, Labour leader Keir Starmer was accused of having broken COVID-19 pandemic legal restrictions at the venue the previous April, by drinking beer and eating takeaway food in a room there with other party members present. This became known as "Beergate".

== Renovation in 2020s ==
In March 2020 the National Lottery Heritage Fund awarded a grant for restoration and renovation work, with the aim of restoring Redhills as a centre of culture and education. In October 2021, as part of the grant agreement, Durham Miners Association transferred ownership of the site to the Redhills Charitable Incorporated Organisation.

In 2022, Redhills stated publicly its intention to join a transnational serial nomination bid for UNESCO World Heritage status, coordinated by The Workers Museum in Copenhagen.

As of 2023, restoration and renovation works were underway. In January 2026, the hall fully reopened after the £14 million restoration.

The Redhills Charity, which operates Redhills Durham Miners Hall, was initially run by Nick Malyan as Chief Executive of the charity. As of January 2026, Andrew McIntyre was the interim Chief Executive.

== See also ==
- Durham Miners' Gala
- Friends of the Durham Miners Gala
- Durham Mining Museum
