= Eddie Collins (miner) =

J. T. Eddie Collins (1894–1972) was a Yorkshire Miner, labour activist and local councillor. He was particularly active at Denaby Main, where he was for many years branch secretary of the Miners Union there.

Eddie was born at Wombwell, a mining village near Barnsley. His father was a sinker at Cadeby Main Colliery in the 1900s, and the family moved to Denaby Main. Eddie had aspirations to be a school teacher, but after failing the relevant exams he started work at Cadeby Main colliery, transferring to Denaby Main in 1911. However he did enrol in classes with the Workers Educational Association where he was taught by Arnold Freeman.
