= Miners' Federation of Great Britain =

- Successor: National Union of Mineworkers
- Founded: 26 November 1889
- Dissolved: 1 January 1945
- Headquarters: 50 Russell Square, London
- Location: United Kingdom
- Members: Bristol Miners' Association; Cumberland Miners' Association; Derbyshire Miners' Association; Durham Miners' Association; Kent Miners' Association; Lancashire and Cheshire Miners' Federation; Leicestershire Miners' Association; Midland Counties Miners' Federation; North Wales Miners' Association; Northumberland Miners' Association; Nottinghamshire Miners' Association; Scottish Miners Federation; Somerset Miners' Association; South Wales Miners' Federation; Yorkshire Miners' Association
- Affiliations: MIF, TUC

The Miners' Federation of Great Britain (MFGB) was established after a meeting of local mining trade unions in Newport, Wales in 1888. The federation was formed to represent and co-ordinate the affairs of local and regional miners' unions in England, Scotland and Wales whose associations remained largely autonomous. At its peak, the federation represented nearly one million workers. It was reorganised into the National Union of Mineworkers in 1945.

== Founding conference and membership ==
In 1888 after colliery owners rejected a call for a pay rise from the Yorkshire Miners' Association, several conferences were organised to discuss the possibility of forming a national union. At the conference held in the Temperance Hall in Newport, South Wales in November 1889, the Miners' Federation of Great Britain (MFGB) was formed. Benjamin Pickard of the Yorkshire Miners' Association was elected president and Sam Woods of the Lancashire and Cheshire Miners' Federation (LCMF) its vice-president. Enoch Edwards from the Midland Counties Miners' Federation was its first treasurer and Thomas Ashton, also from the LCMF, its first secretary. Keir Hardie was one of the Scottish delegates at the conference. At the inaugural meeting it was agreed to raise funds to carry on the federation's business, to protect miners by taking an interest in trade and wages, secure legislation and call conferences to discuss matters. It intended to obtain an eight-hour day "from bank to bank" for all underground workers, attend inquests and seek to obtain compensation for miners killed in incidents involving more than three persons.

Most of the founding unions were part of the Federated District. This had been created in 1888 and covered Yorkshire, Derbyshire, Nottinghamshire, the Midland Counties, Lancashire, Cheshire, and North Wales. In these districts, most output was used within the UK and, as a result, variations in international trade had less impact on them. Their unions were opposed to payment of miners on a "sliding scale" based on the selling price of coal, a practice which was standard in South Wales, Northumberland and Durham. In recognition of this status, a single Conciliation Board was created for the Federated District. The Federated District unions often worked together and opposed initiatives of the other MFGB affiliates. In 1918, a majority of the MFGB decided instead to campaign for a single National Wages Board and this led to the break-up of the Federated District. A. R. Griffin claimed that this "...did incalculable harm to the miners of the Midlands without doing any good to anyone else".

The MFGB's membership increased by 30% in its first year and by 1890 its member federations had 250,000 members. The Northumberland Miners' Association and the Durham Miners' Association initially refused to join but did so in 1907 and 1908. Most of the MFGB's founding officials were still in control in 1910 by which time the membership was more than 600,000. Membership peaked in 1920 when it had more than 945,000 members. In 1926 the membership dropped to 756,000 and had declined to about 530,000 in 1930.

| MFGB member associations | Formed | Joined MFGB | Membership in 1910 | Membership in 1944 |
|---|---|---|---|---|
| Bristol Miners' Association | 1887 | 1889 | 2,167 | 400 |
| Cleveland Miners' and Quarrymen's Association | 1872 | 1892 | 9,743 | N/A |
| Cumberland Miners' Association | 1872 | 1890 | 6,326 | 7,500 |
| Derbyshire Miners' Association (Note: The Derbyshire Miners' Association was not represented at the founding conference, but affiliated before the conference early in 1890.) | 1880 | 1889 | 37,428 | 25,000 |
| Durham Miners' Association | 1869 | 1908 (Note: The Durham Miners' Association joined in 1892, but was expelled in 1893 and not readmitted until 1908.) | 121,805 | 106,472 |
| Forest of Dean Miners' Association | 1870 | 1889 | 3,000 | N/A |
| Kent Miners' Association | 1915 | 1915 | N/A | 5,100 |
| Lancashire and Cheshire Miners' Federation | 1881 | 1889 | 57,516 | 40,000 |
| Leicestershire Miners' Association | 1887 | 1889 | 5,491 | 4,000 |
| Midland Counties Federation of Miners (Note: The Warwickshire Miners' Association held separate membership from 1889 until it joined the Midland Counties Federation.) | 1886 | 1889 | 38,005 | 30,000 |
| National Federation of Colliery Enginemen | 1872 | 1919 | 10,000 (Note: Membership figure for 1913.) | ? |
| National Union of Cokemen and By-product Workers | 1916 | 1917 | N/A | 3,000 |
| Northumberland Miners' Mutual Confident Association | 1864 | 1907 | 37,361 | 28,561 |
| North Wales Miners' Association | 1889 | 1889 | 12,043 | 7,526 |
| Nottinghamshire Miners' Association | 1880 | 1889 | 31,352 | 30,000 |
| Scottish Miners' Federation (Note: Several founding sections of the Scottish Miners' Federation already held membership of the MFGB. The Ayrshire Miners' Union joined in 1889, while the Stirlingshire Miners' County Union was not represented at the founding conference, but affiliated before the conference early in 1890. The Fife and Kinross Miners' Association joined in about 1892, and the Blantyre Miners and Larkhall Miners joined in 1893, shortly before they became part of the Lanarkshire Miners' County Union.) | 1894 | 1894 | 67,602 | 51,000 |
| Somerset Miners' Association | 1888 | 1889 | 4,310 | 2,600 |
| South Derbyshire Amalgamated Miners' Association | 1889 | 1889 | 3,622 | 5,743 |
| South Wales Miners' Federation (Note: Several founding sections of the South Wales Miners' Federation already held membership of the MFGB. The Monmouthshire and South Wales Miners' Association joined in 1889, while the Rhondda Miners and the Neath and Swansea Miners joined in about 1892.) | 1898 | 1899 | 137,553 | 100,000 |
| Yorkshire Miners' Association | 1881 | 1889 | 88,271 | 115,000 |

The organisation was renamed the Mineworkers Federation of Great Britain in 1932, reflecting the creation of groups for enginemen, firemen, electricians and other workers in the industry.

== Events ==
The MFGB joined the Trades Union Congress (TUC) in 1890. In 1893, 300,000 colliery workers were locked out when the mine owners demanded they take a 25% cut in pay. Six weeks into the dispute, two men were killed at a colliery in Featherstone in Yorkshire after the Riot Act had been read and soldiers opened fire on the assembled men. The strike ended nine weeks later after the mine owners backed down.

The MFGB participated in the 1906 Royal Commission on mines' safety and by 1908 had secured an eight-hour day for underground workers. Improving miners' working conditions was important to the federation and Robert Smillie represented it in the Royal Commission on mines' safety that led to the Mines' Regulation Act in 1911.

A lockout in 1910 by Cambrian Collieries in South Wales in a dispute about wage cuts led to a ten-month-long strike by 12,000 men. Home Secretary, Winston Churchill, sent troops to Tonypandy where they charged a group of striking miners with fixed bayonets on 21 November. The strikers returned to work defeated but a conference in 1911 called for a minimum wage. The demand led to the six-week-long National coal strike of 1912 in which more than one million miners participated.

The onset of World War I in 1914 led to calls for the repeal of the eight-hour day and increased productivity. South Wales miners struck in 1915 and increased pay was demanded in 1916 resulting in the coalfields being put into state control. In 1914 the MFGB had joined with the National Union of Railwaymen (NUR) and the National Transport Workers' Federation (NTWF) in the Triple Alliance. In 1919 the Sankey Commission was set up to which the MFGB, colliery owners and government considered the future of the mining industry and two years later the government returned management of the collieries to their owners. In 1921 a decision by the NUR and NTWF not to strike in sympathy with the miners is remembered as Black Friday and signalled the end of the alliance.

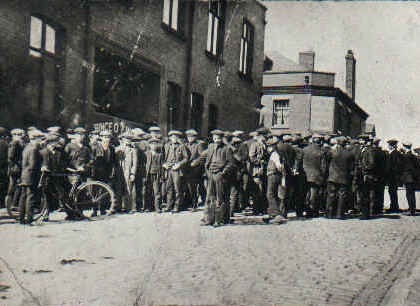
Miners outside Tyldesley Miners Hall during the 1926 General Strike

Pressure for wage cuts in 1925 plunged the MFGB into crisis. The government-backed the colliery owners and the TUC backed the miners. The government proposed setting up a commission and provided a subsidy to maintain wages at the July 1925 level. The commission took no representations from the MFGB and the government built up coal supplies until the report was published in March 1926. The MFGB rejected the report's proposals and its general secretary A. J. Cook coined the slogan, "Not a penny off the pay, not a minute on the day!". The colliery owners locked out more than one million miners, a "state of emergency" was declared and the General Strike began in May 1926. The strike lasted seven months. Despite support from many organisations including local communities, the Labour Party and financial support from workers in the USSR, the strikers were forced back to work in November. The Nottinghamshire Miners' Association led by George Spencer broke away from the MFGB in early November after meeting local colliery owners and formed the rival Nottingham and District Miners' Industrial Union or "Spencer" union.

Following the strike, the federation had lost public sympathy and the economic slump that followed affected miners' wages and working conditions. The MFGB's membership declined and by 1931 unemployment on the coalfields reached more than 40% and wages were poor for working miners. Hunger marches in the 1930s highlighted the plight of mining communities. A disaster at Gresford Colliery demonstrated poor working conditions and breaches in the law by employers. A Royal Commission into mines' safety was started after the 1934 disaster but no new law was passed until the Mines and Quarries Act 1954. Fatalities in the mines had fallen in the years before 1926 but coal industry deaths rose to the 1900 level after the strike.

A ballot for a national strike in 1935 produced the largest majority vote in favour of industrial action. Wages in Nottinghamshire, where the breakaway "Spencer" union-represented 80% of the workforce, were the lowest in the country. Men who remained loyal to the MFGB were victimised and colliery owners refused to recognise the federation. Matters came to a head at Harworth Colliery in 1936. MFGB members demanding recognition struck for six months. Several officials and members were imprisoned and the breakaway union became even more isolated. The MFGB balloted its members about merging with the "Spencer" union but the proposal was rejected. The federation's leadership continued to negotiate until 1937 when the breakaway union returned to the MFGB but amid much bad feeling.

Support for the mining industry to be nationalised grew between the wars and during World War II. At the onset of war, the MFGB and government discussed how best to ensure a supply of coal for the war effort. The miners' position was that they wanted the industry to be nationalised at the end of hostilities. It pressured the Labour Party into readmitting Aneurin Bevan, who had been expelled for advocating a "popular front" with the far-left against the National Government. In 1941 an Essential Work Order was imposed on the mines. In 1942 proposals to merge all districts and local associations into a single miners' union were drafted. After the Labour government was elected in the 1945 general election, the passing of the Coal Industry Nationalisation Act 1946 meant all the industry's assets, rights and liabilities passed to the National Coal Board and the MFGB was reorganised into a single union, the National Union of Mineworkers.

== Political affiliation ==
The miners' unions were the largest and most powerful industrial combinations in Britain for decades and exercised a great influence on the rest of the British labour movement. The first working-class MPs, Thomas Burt and Alexander Macdonald were elected in 1874. They represented mining constituencies and were funded by miners' associations. Elected as Liberal-Labour candidates, they supported by the Liberal Party.

The Independent Labour Party (ILP), formed in 1893, was never very influential in the coalfields, but the Lib-Labs responded to its calls for independent labour candidatures by proposing that the federation would support any candidate put forward by a member union, regardless of the political party. When the proposal was adopted many unions put forward Liberal candidates, but the Lancashire and Cheshire Miners' Federation was an early affiliate of the Labour Representation Committee (LRC), and the Scottish Miners' Federation was the principal backer of the Scottish Workers' Representation Committee. Other districts chose not to involve themselves in politics.

In the early 1900s, many affiliates were frustrated with the Liberal Party's reluctance to adopt trade union candidates or take up trade union matters in Parliament. In 1906, the MFGB held a national ballot on whether to affiliate to the LRC. The proposal was defeated by 101,714 votes to 92,222. South Wales, Scotland, Yorkshire and Lancashire, the largest affiliates, were in favour of joining, but most smaller affiliates were strongly opposed. After the close vote, the transformation of the LRC into the Labour Party and newly affiliated unions from Durham and Northumberland to the MFGB, a second ballot was held in 1908. While the pattern of voting was similar, increased membership of the largest affiliates and stronger support among them, led to the earlier decision being overturned by 213,137 votes to 168,446.

On affiliation to Labour, MPs sponsored by member unions were asked to join the Labour Party group in parliament. Many did, but a small number negotiated an exemption and remained Lib-Labs until 1918 causing ongoing disputes among members, but in 1918 the retirement of the remaining Lib-Labs and Labour's adoption of a programme championing nationalisation cemented the relationship. Syndicalism had short-lived popularity among members, but the defeat of the 1926 UK general strike ended it as a significant force, and the MFGB leadership adopted a policy of strong support for the Labour Party leadership, putting great effort into securing parliamentary majorities for the party.

The Communist Party of Great Britain, founded in 1920, attempted to bypass the MFGB in gaining support among miners. It set up the Miners' Minority Movement, which saw initial success when activist A. J. Cook was elected as the MFGB General Secretary, but a motion for the MFGB to affiliate to the communist Red International of Labour Unions attracted little support, and Cook later distanced himself from the communists. The MFGB did support allowing the CPGB to affiliate with the Labour Party in 1936, but the party leadership refused.

== Officers of the federation ==
| Year | President | Vice president | General Secretary | Treasurer |
|---|---|---|---|---|
| 1889 | Benjamin Pickard | Sam Woods | Thomas Ashton | Enoch Edwards |
| 1904 | Enoch Edwards | Sam Woods | Thomas Ashton | William Abraham |
| 1909 | Enoch Edwards | Robert Smillie | Thomas Ashton | William Abraham |
| 1912 | Robert Smillie | W. E. Harvey | Thomas Ashton | William Abraham |
| 1914 | Robert Smillie | William House | Thomas Ashton | William Abraham |
| 1917 | Robert Smillie | Herbert Smith | Thomas Ashton | William Abraham |
| 1918 | Robert Smillie | Herbert Smith | Thomas Ashton | James Robson |
| 1919 | Robert Smillie | Herbert Smith | Frank Hodges | James Robson |
| 1922 | Herbert Smith | Stephen Walsh | Frank Hodges | James Robson |
| 1924 | Herbert Smith | Thomas Richards | A. J. Cook | W. P. Richardson |
| 1929 | Thomas Richards | Ebby Edwards | A. J. Cook | W. P. Richardson |
| 1930 | Thomas Richards | Ebby Edwards | A. J. Cook | Position in abeyance |
| 1931 | Ebby Edwards | Peter Lee | A. J. Cook | Position in abeyance |
| 1932 | Peter Lee | Joseph Jones | Ebby Edwards | Position in abeyance |
| 1933 | Peter Lee | S. O. Davies | Ebby Edwards | Position in abeyance |
| 1934 | Joseph Jones | Will Lawther | Ebby Edwards | Position in abeyance |
| 1939 | Will Lawther | Jim Bowman | Ebby Edwards | Position in abeyance |

== See also ==
- History of coal mining#Great Britain
- Trades Union Congress
