= Checkweighman =

Occupation within mining, especially coal

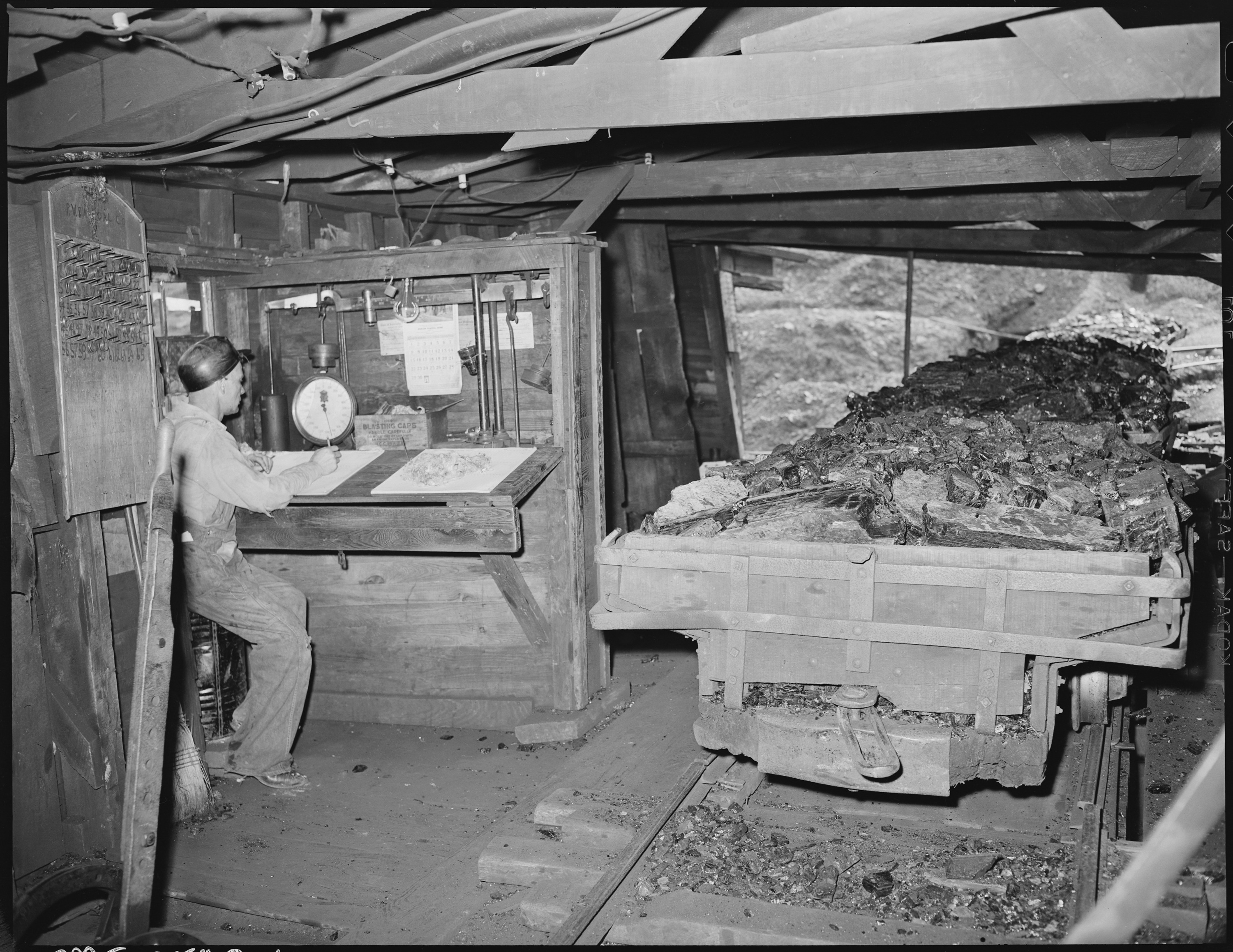
A checkweighman at work at the Clover Gap Mine in Kentucky in 1946

A checkweighman (occasionally checkmeasurer or checkweigher) is a person who is responsible for weighing coal or another mined substance, and thereby determining the payment due to each worker.

In many coal mines, workers have been paid by the weight of coal they mine. Historically, it was impractical to weigh the coal until it had been conveyed to the surface, and therefore the system required a high level of trust. Checkweighmen appointed by the colliery management were often accused of underestimating weights, or even working with scales which they knew to produce incorrect values.

From the mid-19th century, there was a movement in many countries among miners and their trade unions to make the position of checkweighman an elected one. This right was won in the United Kingdom in 1860 although, until 1887, companies could discharge a checkweighman they disliked, reducing the independence of the role. In parts of the United States and also in New Zealand, struggles over the right to elect the post continued into the 20th century. While the post was most common by far in coal mines, it was sometimes found in other mines or quarries.

In larger mines, there might be multiple checkweighmen, who could additionally check each other's work, or assistant checkweighmen who might be elected or appointed.

Because a checkweighman had been elected and was trusted by the workers at the mine, the position was often held by people who became prominent trade unionists or politicians. Additional duties were often combined with the post; for example, in the UK, checkweighmen were given the right to act as Inspectors of Mines, further increasing their power.

Later in the 20th century, many miners were paid a fixed wage rather than by weight of coal, and so in these cases the position of checkweighman became unnecessary and was abolished.

== Notable checkweighmen ==
=== Denaby Main ===
- Eddie Collins

=== Glass Houghton Colliery ===
- Herbert Smith

=== Mardy Colliery ===
- Thomas Isaac Mardy Jones, 1907-1909
- Noah Ablett, 1910–1917
- Ted Williams, 1917-18
- Arthur Horner, 1918–1919

=== Summerlee Colliery ===
- Robert Smillie

=== Middleton Colliery ===
- William Lunn

=== Other ===
- D. J. Williams
- Jack Lawson, 1st Baron Lawson
- John Forman
