= Normanton by-election =

Normanton by-election may refer to one of four parliamentary by-elections held in the British House of Commons constituency of Normanton in West Yorkshire:

- 1904 Normanton by-election
- 1905 Normanton by-election
- 1933 Normanton by-election
- 1947 Normanton by-election

See also

- Normanton (UK Parliament constituency)
