= Owen Briscoe =

British trade unionist

Owen Briscoe (19 November 1920 – 3 March 1992) was a British trade unionist.

Born in South Wales, Briscoe's family moved to Yorkshire early in the 1930s to find work. He left school at the age of fourteen to work at Markham Main Colliery, then during World War II served with the Coldstream Guards, participating in the Battle for Caen, at which he was nearly killed.

When the war ended, Briscoe returned to the mines, where he became active in the Yorkshire Area of the National Union of Mineworkers (NUM), being elected first to his branch committee, then as president of the branch at Armthorpe. From there, he was promoted to become Secretary of the NUM's Doncaster Area Panel, in which he developed a reputation as a supporter of militant action, including an unofficial strike in 1969.

Briscoe was elected to the NUM's national executive in 1972 then, the following year, as general secretary of the Yorkshire Area. He had stood as a member of the "Yorkshire Left" platform, and defeated Bill O'Brien in the election. He was a staunch supporter of the UK miners' strike of 1984 to 1985, standing down shortly after its defeat.

Trade union offices
Preceded by Sid Schofield	General Secretary of the Yorkshire Area of the National Union of Mineworkers; 1973 – 1985	Succeeded by Sammy Thompson
