= Frederick Hall (Normanton MP) =

British politician (1855–1933)

Frederick Hall circa 1905

Frederick Hall (1855 – 18 April 1933) was a British Liberal Party or Lib-Lab then Labour Party politician who was an official of the Yorkshire Miners' Association.

== Background ==
He was a son of John and Hannah Hall. He was educated at night-school for one year, and self-taught subsequently. In 1878 he married Ann Maria Edwards, a daughter of William Edwards.

== Work and Trade Unionism ==
At the age of 9 he started working in a coal mine. He worked at the Aldwarke Main Colliery, Rotherham. In 1878 he became a check-weighman. In the same year he became Treasurer of the Yorkshire Miners' Association. In 1898 he stopped working as a check-weighman. In 1904 he stopped being the Association's Treasurer and became its Miners' Agent.

== Politics ==
He was elected to the West Riding of Yorkshire County Council, serving for 12 years. He took an interest in local education, serving for 18 years as a member of the Rawmarsh School Board, including a period of 9 years as its chairman.

He was the Liberal candidate for the Normanton Division of West Yorkshire at the 1905 Normanton by-election. He was elected to the House of Commons at the by-election, following the death of the sitting member of parliament (MP), William Parrott. In 1909 the Miners Federation of Great Britain instructed him and all other MPs sponsored by their local miners associations to take the Labour Party whip and seek re-election in 1910 as a Labour Party candidate, which he did. He served as a justice of the peace in the West Riding of Yorkshire. He was a Grand Master of the British United Order of Oddfellows. In 1915 his YMA colleague John Wadsworth re-took the Liberal whip in the House of Commons, and there is some evidence that Hall may have done likewise. He contested the 1918 General Election as a Labour Party candidate. After the 1918 General Election he again took the Labour party whip, and soon after he became a Labour Whip. He continued as Whip, serving as a Government Whip while Labour were in office in 1924. He represented the constituency for 28 years, until his death in 1933, aged 78.

Parliament of the United Kingdom
Preceded by William Parrott	Member of Parliament for Normanton; 1905–1933	Succeeded by Tom Smith
Trade union offices
Preceded by Arthur Hayday and John Hill	Trades Union Congress representative to the American Federation of Labour; 1918; With: Margaret Bondfield	Succeeded by Margaret Bondfield and Samuel Finney
