= General Brooke (disambiguation) =

General Brooke refers to Alan Brooke, 1st Viscount Alanbrooke (1883–1963), Chief of the Imperial General Staff during the Second World War. General Brooke may also refer to:

- Arthur Brooke (British Army officer) (1772–1843), British Army lieutenant general
- Christopher Brooke (British Army officer) (1869–1948), British Army brigadier general
- Hugh Fenwick Brooke (1871–1948), British Army brigadier general
- John R. Brooke (1838–1926), Union Army major general

== See also ==
- Robert Brooke-Popham (1878–1953), Royal Air Force general
- Attorney General Brooke (disambiguation)
