= Markham Colliery =

Markham Colliery may refer to:

- Markham Colliery at Staveley, Chesterfield, Derbyshire, England, site of the Markham Colliery disaster
- Markham Colliery in Markham, Caerphilly, Wales
- Markham Main Colliery near Doncaster, England
