= Bill O'Brien (British politician) =

British Member of Parliament (1929–2025)

Sir Bill O'Brien
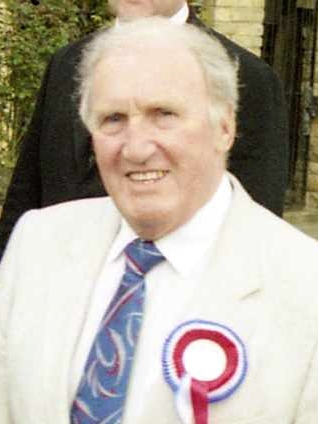
- O'Brien in 2010

Member of Parliament for Normanton
- In office 9 June 1983 – 11 April 2005
- Preceded by: Albert Roberts
- Succeeded by: Ed Balls

Personal details
- Born: 25 January 1929 Pontefract, England
- Died: 18 May 2025 (aged 96)
- Party: Labour
- Spouse: Jean Schofield
- Education: University of Leeds

Sir William O'Brien (25 January 1929 – 18 May 2025) was a British Labour Party Member of Parliament.

== Early life ==
Born in the historic market town of Pontefract, West Riding of Yorkshire, O'Brien was previously a miner from 1946 to 1983 and local councillor on Wakefield Council from 1973 to 1983. He stood unsuccessfully for the post of Secretary for the Yorkshire region of the National Union of Mineworkers in 1973, losing to Owen Briscoe from the Yorkshire Left group. He was considered the moderate candidate from the moderate Glasshoughton colliery, whereas Briscoe was a militant from Armthorpe Colliery.

He gained a BEd degree from the University of Leeds in 1978.

== Parliamentary career ==
O'Brien entered the House of Commons as the Member of Parliament for Normanton at the 1983 general election, and re-elected at four further general elections until he retired at the 2005 general election. He served as both an Opposition Spokesman on Environment (1987–92) and Opposition Spokesman on Northern Ireland (1992–94).

He was named a Knight Bachelor in the 2010 Dissolution Honours.

== Personal life and death ==
O'Brien married Jean Scofield, and the couple had three daughters. He died on 18 May 2025, at the age of 96.

== Bibliography ==
The Prince of Wales Colliery

Parliament of the United Kingdom
Preceded by Albert Roberts	Member of Parliament for Normanton; 1983–2005	Succeeded by Ed Balls
