= Hallamshire (constituency) =

Parliamentary constituency in the United Kingdom, 1885–1918

- Former county constituency for the House of Commons
- County: West Riding of Yorkshire

1885–1918
- Seats: One
- Created from: Southern West Riding of Yorkshire
- Replaced by: Penistone, Rotherham and Wentworth

Hallamshire was a Parliamentary constituency covering the Hallamshire district of England. The constituency was created in 1885 and abolished in 1918. The seat was a large geographical area which in the west included the moors of the Pennines (Howden Moors, Midhope Moors, Broom Read Moor, Bradfield Moor and Hallam Moor), but came down from the hills in the centre to include better farmland north of Sheffield around Ecclesfield. In the north-east it included part of the South Yorkshire coalfield and some mining villages. In the south, the residents of Sheffield who owned their freeholds could vote in this division.

For twenty years the Member of Parliament was the Sheffield cutler and steel manufacturer, Sir Frederick Mappin, who was able to unite the middle-class voters from Sheffield with the hill-farmers and the miners to vote for him as a Liberal. When he retired the local Liberal association selected a miner, John Wadsworth, who was President of the Yorkshire Miners Association in 1903 and sponsored by the Miners' Federation of Great Britain. With the other MFGB sponsored MPs, Wadsworth transferred to the Labour Party in 1909.

== Boundaries ==
The constituency covered an area north and west of inner Sheffield. On its creation in 1885 it was defined as containing the Municipal Borough of Sheffield, and the Parishes of Bradfield, Ecclesfield, Wath-upon-Dearne, Brampton Bierlow, Wentworth, Handsworth, Tankersley, Nether Hoyland, and Wortley.

The Municipal Borough of Sheffield was also a Parliamentary Borough and so the only electors from that area entitled to vote in Hallamshire were those who were freeholders. They could, of course, also exercise their vote in the appropriate division of the Parliamentary Borough of Sheffield. However, there were always considerable numbers of Sheffield freeholders who voted at elections for Hallamshire according to Henry Pelling in his Social Geography of British Elections 1885-1910.

This anomaly of the electoral system was ended in 1918. The remainder of the constituency formed the cores of both the Penistone and Wentworth constituencies in boundary changes made that year.

== Members of Parliament ==
- 1885-1906: Sir Frederick Mappin, Liberal
- 1906-1918: John Wadsworth, Lib-Lab, then Labour

== Election results ==
=== Elections in the 1880s ===
General election 1885: Hallamshire
Party	Candidate	Votes	%	±%
Liberal	Frederick Mappin	6,454	59.2	
Conservative	Charles Wentworth-Fitzwilliam	4,451	40.8	
Majority		2,003	18.4	
Turnout		10,905	82.8	
Registered electors		13,176		
Liberal win (new seat)				

General election 1886: Hallamshire
Party	Candidate	Votes	%	±%
Liberal	Frederick Mappin	Unopposed		
Liberal hold				

=== Elections in the 1890s ===
General election 1892: Hallamshire
Party	Candidate	Votes	%	±%
Liberal	Frederick Mappin	Unopposed		
Liberal hold				

Mappin

General election 1895: Hallamshire
Party	Candidate	Votes	%	±%
Liberal	Frederick Mappin	5,949	54.1	N/A
Conservative	Frank Hatchard	5,054	45.9	New
Majority		895	8.2	N/A
Turnout		11,003	76.0	N/A
Registered electors		14,483		
Liberal hold		Swing	N/A	

=== Elections in the 1900s ===
General election 1900: Hallamshire
Party	Candidate	Votes	%	±%
Liberal	Frederick Mappin	6,688	57.5	+3.4
Conservative	Frank Hatchard	4,938	42.5	−3.4
Majority		1,750	15.0	+6.8
Turnout		11,626	74.5	−1.5
Registered electors		15,610		
Liberal hold		Swing	+3.4	

John Wadsworth

General election 1906: Hallamshire
Party	Candidate	Votes	%	±%
Lib-Lab	John Wadsworth	8,375	55.2	−2.3
Conservative	Frederic Kelley	6,807	44.8	+2.3
Majority		1,568	10.4	−4.6
Turnout		15,182	83.9	+9.4
Registered electors		18,085		
Lib-Lab hold		Swing	−2.3	

=== Elections in the 1910s ===
General election January 1910: Hallamshire
Party	Candidate	Votes	%	±%
Labour	John Wadsworth	10,193	62.2	+7.0
Conservative	Thomas Sutton Timmis	6,185	37.8	−7.0
Majority		4,008	24.4	N/A
Turnout		16,378	82.2	−1.7
Registered electors		19,935		
Labour gain from Lib-Lab		Swing	+7.0	

General election December 1910: Hallamshire
Party	Candidate	Votes	%	±%
Labour	John Wadsworth	8,708	59.9	−2.3
Conservative	David Thurston Smith	5,837	40.1	+2.3
Majority		2,871	19.8	−4.6
Turnout		14,545	73.0	−9.2
Registered electors		19,935		
Labour hold		Swing	−2.3	

Another General Election was required to take place before the end of 1915. The political parties had been making preparations for an election to take place and by July 1914, the following candidates had been selected;

- Liberal: John Wadsworth
- Labour: Thomas Walter Grundy

== Sources ==
- Boundary Commission Report, 1885
- British Parliamentary Election Results 1885-1918 by F. W. S. Craig (Parliamentary Research Services, Chichester, 1977)
- Social Geography of British Elections 1885-1910 by Henry Pelling (Macmillan, London, 1967)
- Leigh Rayment's Historical List of MPs – Constituencies beginning with "H" (part 1)
- Richard Kimber's Political Science Resources (Election results since 1951)
