= William Parrott =

British politician (1843–1905)

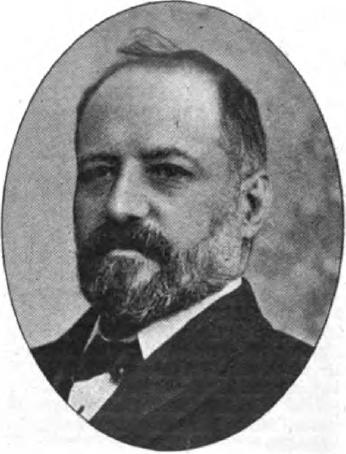
Parrott shortly before his death

William Parrott (18 December 1843 – 9 November 1905) was a British coalminer, trade union official and Liberal–Labour (Lib–Lab) politician.

== Early life ==
Parrott was born at Row Green, a village in Somerset but his parents soon moved to Yorkshire. Parrott had no formal education and was essentially self-taught. He began work in a brickyard at the age of eight years. Aged nine, he was working in a factory and just before his tenth birthday he started work at Methley Colliery as a pit-boy. In 1869 he had married Eliza Thompson of Methley and they had a son and three daughters.

== Miners Association official ==
In 1872 he became the first checkweighman elected by the miners of Good Hope Pit, Normanton Common. From this time onwards he was drawn more and more into trade union work. In 1876 he was elected assistant secretary of the West Yorkshire Miners Association. Held this office until 1881 when the West and South Yorkshire Miners Associations were amalgamated to form the Yorkshire Miners Association of which Parrott was appointed agent, a post he held for 20 years. During this time he attended the first ever international conference of coal miners, held in Brussels. He became general-secretary of the Yorkshire Miners Association in 1904. Parrott was one of four men who were credited with the establishment of the Yorkshire Miners Association as it existed at the time of his death, the others being Ben Pickard, (Lib-Lab member of Parliament for Normanton from 1885 to 1904), J Frith and E Cowey.

In January 1894 Parrott was appointed a representative of the Yorkshire Miners at a conciliation board meeting held at Westminster Palace Hotel to settle a dispute over miners' wages following a report by a committee headed by Lord Rosebery. Parrott remained a member of the miners' side of the conciliation board until the time of his death. Despite the work of the board, by 1896, Parrott was warning that miners had given their representatives authority to arrange strikes if the latest round of wage increases were not met and if mines were closed and men thrown out of work. He addressed a meeting of miners saying that Yorkshire was fully prepared to meet the emergency, that the men were well-organised and had both the funds and courage necessary. They were as determined as ever to fight for the maintenance and principle of the living wage.

His work for the Miners Association took him into the wider trade union world and in 1899 he was elected auditor to the Standing Orders Committee of the TUC.

== Politics ==
Parrott had cut his teeth in politics locally and was a member of the Barnsley School Board for three years and had been an elected member of Barnsley Town Council for nine years. He was however contemplating a Parliamentary career and had been adopted as Liberal candidate in East Leeds. However the death of Ben Pickard the sitting Lib–Lab MP for Normanton in 1904 meant a vacancy and a by-election. Parrott was selected as candidate and he won the seat by a majority of 3,946 over his Conservative opponent. There was no Liberal candidate as since 1885 the Yorkshire Miners Association had had an agreement with the Liberals allowing them nominate the candidate for elections to the Parliament of the United Kingdom. Pickard had held the seat at each election under this arrangement since the 1885 general election and generally supported the Liberals in Parliament in return. Parrott was a member of the Liberal Party and again generally voted with the Liberals in Parliament.

Parrott made his maiden speech in the House of Commons during the Finance Bill or budget debate on 19 July 1904, in opposition to a coal levy which he feared would lower the wages of miners or put their jobs at risk. There were already thousands of miners only working two days a week thanks to the levy as the coal owners were reducing costs by laying off men to claw back the money lost on the tax. On 18 February 1905, he was a member of a deputation of miners' representatives to the Chancellor of the Exchequer, Austen Chamberlain to urge that the one shilling duty on export coal should be repealed.

== Death and successor ==
Parrott died at Barnsley at 10.15 pm on 9 November 1905 aged 61, having been ill in bed for a fortnight before and unconscious for two days. His health had not been good for some time having suffered a paralytic seizure in 1903. His former Yorkshire Miners Association colleague Fred Hall was chosen to succeed Parrott as candidate in the by-election caused by his death. The Liberal Party again honoured their agreement not to stand against the Miners' candidate and Hall was returned unopposed as MP for Normanton, serving until 1933.

Parliament of the United Kingdom
Preceded by Ben Pickard	Member of Parliament for Normanton; 1904–1905	Succeeded by Frederick Hall
Trade union offices
Preceded by ?	President of the West Yorkshire Miners' Association; 1876	Succeeded by Edward Cowey
Preceded by Thomas Ashton and Fred Hammill	Auditor of the Trades Union Congress; 1895–1896; With: William Henry Wilkinson	Succeeded by William Matkin and William Henry Wilkinson
Preceded by William Matkin and William Henry Wilkinson	Auditor of the Trades Union Congress; 1898–1902; With: William Henry Wilkinson	Succeeded by John Wadsworth and William Henry Wilkinson
Preceded by Ben Pickard	General Secretary of the Yorkshire Miners' Association; 1904–1905	Succeeded by John Wadsworth
