= Alwyn Machen =

British trade union leader (1900–1960)

Joseph Robert Alwyn Machen (3 May 1900 – 2 March 1960) was an English trade union leader who was president of the Yorkshire Area of the National Union of Mineworkers and posthumously elected president of the National Union of Mineworkers.

Born into a coal mining family in Clowne, Derbyshire, Machen left school and began working as a coal miner at the age of 13. He continued his education at the Chesterfield Labour College, and soon began to lecture personally at the college. He joined the Miners' Federation of Great Britain (MFGB), and through this role, helped organise a major demonstration in London in 1925, where he heard Herbert Smith and A. J. Cook speak, becoming a supporter of the two miners' leaders.

Following the UK general strike, Machen struggled to find work, but eventually gained employment at a colliery in Thorne in Yorkshire. There, he joined the Miners' Federation of Great Britain (MFGB), and rapidly rose through its ranks, first within his local union branch, then in 1945 becoming the regional Compensation Agent. In this role, he became well-known and wrote a book on the Industrial Injuries Act, 1946. In 1952, he was elected as President of the Yorkshire Miners' Association.

A member of the Labour Party, Machen was elected as a councillor on the West Riding of Yorkshire County Council, and also on Thorne Rural District Council.

Machen first stood for the post of President of the National Union of Mineworkers (successor to the MFGB) in 1945, coming second to Will Lawther. He stood again in January 1960, but on 2 March died suddenly in hospital in Leeds, aged 59. The count for the presidential election was completed a few days later, showing that he had been posthumously elected to the position.

Trade union offices
| Preceded by Joe Hall | President of the Yorkshire Area of the National Union of Mineworkers; 1952–1960 | Succeeded by Sam Bullough |
| Preceded by Ernest Jones | President of the National Union of Mineworkers; 1960 | Succeeded by Sidney Ford |
