= Steve Kemp =

Steve Kemp may refer to:

- Steve Kemp (baseball)
- Steve Kemp (musician)
- Steve Kemp (trade unionist)
- Steve Kemp, a secondary antagonist in Stephen King's 1981 horror novel, Cujo.

== See also ==
- Stephen Kemp, English pianist and composer
