= WYMA =

WYMA may refer to:

- WYMA-LP, a defunct low-power radio station (97.9 FM) formerly licensed to serve Calhoun, Tennessee, United States
- West Yorkshire Miners' Association, former British trade union
