= John Judge =

John Judge could refer to:

- John Judge (trade unionist) (1849/50–1916), British trade unionist
- John "Jack" Judge (1872–1938), British musician and songwriter
- John Judge (politician) (born 1944), American politician from Iowa

== See also ==
- Jonathan Judge, American television producer and director
