= Chris Kitchen =

British trade union leader (born 1966)

- Born: 23 June 1966 (age 59)
- Occupation(s): Former coal miner General Secretary of the National Union of Mineworkers

Christian James Ronald Kitchen (born 23 June 1966) is a British trade union leader who has held the position of General Secretary of the National Union of Mineworkers (NUM) since 2007.

Prior to becoming NUM General Secretary, Kitchen was branch secretary at the Kellingley Colliery.

Trade union offices
Preceded by Steve Kemp	Secretary Yorkshire Area of the National Union of Mineworkers; 2007–present	Incumbent
Preceded by Steve Kemp	General Secretary of the National Union of Mineworkers; 2007–present	Incumbent
