= Sammy Thompson =

British trade unionist

Sammy Thompson (1932 or 1933 – August 1988) was a British trade unionist.

== Career ==
Thompson left school in 1948 and began working as a coal miner at Markham Main Colliery. He became active in the Yorkshire Area of the National Union of Mineworkers (NUM), and became a leading ally of Arthur Scargill through his activism during the strikes of 1972, 1974 and 1984 to 1985. Shortly after the defeat of this last strike, Owen Briscoe, general secretary of the Yorkshire Area, resigned and Thompson was elected to succeed him.

In 1987, Thompson was elected as Vice-President of the NUM, receiving the support of Scargill, and beating Eric Clarke by 34,802 votes to 25,926. He became known for working in solidarity with other unions, including the National Union of Seamen and mining unions in other countries, but developed cancer and died in August 1988.

Trade union offices
Preceded by Owen Briscoe	General Secretary of the Yorkshire Area of the National Union of Mineworkers; 1985 – 1988	Succeeded by Ken Homer
Preceded by Mick McGahey	Vice President of the National Union of Mineworkers; 1987–1988	Vacant Title next held by Frank Cave
