= 1904 Normanton by-election =

UK parliamentary by-election

The 1904 Normanton by-election was a Parliamentary by-election held on 1 March 1904. The constituency returned one Member of Parliament (MP) to the House of Commons of the United Kingdom, elected by the first past the post voting system.

== Vacancy ==
The death of Benjamin Pickard the sitting Lib-Lab Member of Parliament for Normanton in 1904 meant a vacancy and a by-election in the division. Since 1885 the Yorkshire Miners Association had had an agreement with the Liberals allowing them nominate the candidate for elections to Parliament. Pickard had held the seat at each election under this arrangement since the 1885 general election and generally supported the Liberals in Parliament in return.

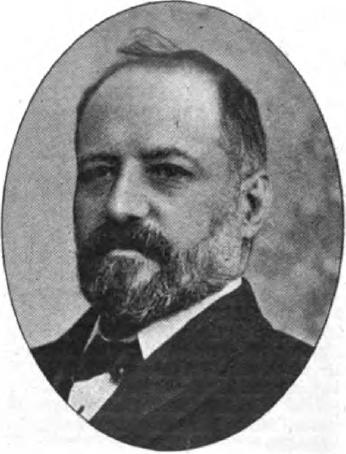
Parrott shortly before his death

== Lib-Lab successor ==
Miners' officials were expecting a contest between their president John Wadsworth and their treasurer Fred Hall. However, there was a third candidate, William Parrott, another Yorkshire Miners Association official. Although he had been canvassed as a possible candidate he was not expected to put his name forward as he was thought to be committed to a different constituency. However, by the time the miners were asked to vote, the names of all three men were on the ballot paper. Parrott was selected and abandoned his candidature for the Liberals in East Leeds. The Liberals again decided not to oppose the miners' candidate and the Independent Labour Party also chose not stand a candidate. Parrott, as a member of the Liberal Party, could anticipate the votes of the general body of Liberals in his seat as well as the support of the miners. In addition he had a strong and close association with the late MP, Benjamin Pickard, through his work as a trade unionist going back nearly 30 years.

== By-election issues ==
The election was called for 1 March 1904. The Conservatives selected a London man, Marcus R P Dorman to oppose Parrott.

Parrott's election address emphasised four points. First he wanted an amendment of the law to secure greater freedoms for trade unions. He was particularly arguing for the restoration of the law on trade unions to what it had been before the Taff Vale case. His next policy opposed the Education Act 1902. He regretted the abolition of school boards elected by ratepayers in their district, which had been popular with radicals and their replacement by local education authorities under the control of county or borough councils. Nonconformist electors objected that their local taxes were being used to support the teaching of religious views to which they were opposed, ‘Rome on the Rates' was their rallying cry. Anglican and Roman Catholic church schools, supported by public funds, were not under public control and teachers in these sectarian schools were subject to religious tests. Parrott's third policy priority was fiscal reform, in particular opposing a levy on the export of coal, as coal-owners were cutting wage rates and laying off miners to pay for this tax. Finally he was strongly in favour of the temperance movement.

In addition to these points, Parrott made clear during the campaign that he was strongly opposed to preferential tariffs and in favour of the traditional Liberal policy of Free Trade, which was largely thought to favour working people with cheap food. Also, the constituency had about 800 Irish electors who were expected to vote for Parrott. As a Liberal he was believed to be in favour of Home Rule but the religious aspects of the education issue complicated matters.

Dorman's campaign mostly consisted of his defence of the Conservative government and trying to convince the miners and other workingmen that he had their interests at heart. He was in favour of taxation reform to protect British markets and opposed the immigration into Britain of what he described as destitute aliens.

== Campaign atmosphere ==
On the whole it was reported as being a quiet campaign compared with some. There was the usual round of public meetings but with the preponderance of outside help and speakers being on the Lib-Lab side and the Conservative candidate suffering more at the expense of hecklers at his events. A later report indicated that Dorman had more or less had to cope single-handedly with very few outside speakers coming in to support his candidature. It was also reported that support for Parrott from Parliamentary speakers had been less than anticipated with many village meetings in the mining areas having been only sparsely attended but this was not helped by the weather which was generally cold and snowy.

One interesting aside, the two candidates took part in a football match on Saturday 27 February between teams from Normanton and Dewsbury, with Dorman kicking off the first half and Parrott kicking off the second. The result is not reported.

On polling day the weather continued cold and there was light snow in the air but the snow was not severe enough to interfere with the election. Parrott toured the constituency in a carriage and pair, Dorman had the use of a motor-car.

== Result ==
Despite worries that there might be some apathy in the electorate in view of the previous Lib-Lab domination of the seat and a slow turn-out in the early part of the day Parrott polled 6,855 votes to Dorman's 2,909; a majority of 3,946 (from an electorate of 14,898). This was a larger vote than Pickard had received in all the five previous elections since 1885 and a larger majority than Pickard had ever achieved.

Parrott served as MP for Normanton until his death in November 1905. He was succeeded as MP by his former Yorkshire Miners Association colleague Fred Hall.
