= 1947 Normanton by-election =

UK parliamentary by-election

The 1947 Normanton by-election was a parliamentary by-election held for the British House of Commons constituency of Normanton on 11 February 1947. The seat had become vacant when the Labour Member of Parliament Tom Smith had resigned, to take up the post of Labour Director of the North-Eastern Divisional Coal Board. Smith had held the seat since the by-election in 1933.

The Labour candidate, George Sylvester, held the seat for his party. The Conservative Party candidate was Enoch Powell, the first time he had stood for election, but he was heavily defeated.

Normanton by-election, 1947
Party	Candidate	Votes	%	±%
Labour	George Sylvester	19,085	79.8	−4.5
Conservative	Enoch Powell	4,258	17.8	+2.1
Independent	W. D. Hartley	579	2.4	New
Majority		14,827	62.0	−6.6
Turnout		23,922	54.6	−25.3
Labour hold		Swing	-3.3	

== See also ==
- Normanton (UK Parliament constituency)
- 1904 Normanton by-election
- 1905 Normanton by-election
- 1933 Normanton by-election
- List of United Kingdom by-elections
