= Benjamin Pickard =

British politician (1842–1904)

- Pickard in 1895

Member of Parliament for Normanton
- In office 1885–1904
- Preceded by: Constituency established
- Succeeded by: William Parrott

General Secretary of the West Yorkshire Miners' Association
- In office 1876–1881
- Preceded by: John Dixon
- Succeeded by: Position abolished

General Secretary of the Yorkshire Miners' Association
- In office 1881–1904
- Preceded by: Position established
- Succeeded by: William Parrott

President of the Miners' Federation of Great Britain
- In office 1889–1904
- Preceded by: Position established
- Succeeded by: Enoch Edwards

Personal details
- Born: 26 or 28 February 1842 Kippax, West Yorkshire, England
- Died: 3 February 1904 (aged 61) Westminster, London, England
- Party: Liberal-Labour
- Spouse: Hannah Elizabeth Freeman of Kippax (m. 1864; died 1901)
- Children: 8
- Occupation: Coal miner; trade unionist; politician
- Nickname: Ben Pickard

Benjamin Pickard, usually Ben Pickard (26 or 28 February 1842 – 3 February 1904), was a British coal miner, trade unionist and Lib–Lab politician.

== Early life ==
Pickard was born in Kippax near Leeds in the West Riding of Yorkshire, the son of a collier. He started work as a pit boy at the age of twelve. He earned a reputation as a studious boy and attended Kippax School. He also received religious training as a Wesleyan, becoming a local preacher and was connected with the Lord's Rest Day Association throughout his life. He was associated with the trade union movement from an early age, becoming a lodge secretary at sixteen.

== Early career ==
=== Trade unions ===
In 1873, Pickard was appointed assistant secretary of the West Yorkshire Miners' Association, and in 1876, he became secretary. He was responsible for uniting the West and South Yorkshire Miners' Associations into one body in 1881 and became the first secretary of the Yorkshire Miners' Association. In 1877, he was assistant secretary of the Miners' National Union and was a leading player in the foundation of the Miners' Federation of Great Britain, of which he was elected the first president.

In 1893, Pickard led the miners in the biggest industrial dispute the country had hitherto seen. The result of the combined strike and lockout was the establishment of a Board of Conciliation to address problems arising in the industry, and most disputes over the coming years were settled using this machinery. He played an active part in obtaining legislation in the mining industry, including the Eight Hours Bill, restricting the hours miners could work underground, although it did not become law until after his death.

=== International work ===
Pickard was active in establishing the International Federation of Mineworkers in 1890. He organised six international congresses of miners from Britain, Germany, Austria, France and Belgium which were held in Paris, Jolimont near La Louvière, Brussels, Berlin, Aix-la-Chapelle and London. He also attended about eighteen Trade Union Congresses. In 1897, his interest in arbitration and the work of the Peace Society led to his inclusion in a peace deputation to Grover Cleveland, President of the United States.

== Political career ==
In addition to his commitment to the interests of organised labour, Pickard was known as an 'ardent liberal'. He served as a member of the Wakefield School Board from 1881 until 1885 and in 1889 was appointed an alderman of the West Riding County Council on which he was a co-opted member. He was re-elected alderman in 1895 and 1901.

In 1885 the Yorkshire Miners Association came to an agreement with the Liberal Party allowing the association to nominate the candidate for elections to Parliament for the Normanton division of Yorkshire, a constituency in which more than 60% of the electorate were coal miners. Pickard was selected and won the seat at each election under this arrangement from 1885 until his death in 1904. In return, he generally supported the Liberals in Parliament.

== Personal life and death ==
In 1864, he married Hannah Elizabeth Freeman of Kippax, and they had four sons and four daughters. His wife died in 1901.

Pickard died of heart failure in Westminster in 1904, aged 61, having been ill for some time.

Parliament of the United Kingdom
New constituency	Member of Parliament for Normanton; 1885–1904	Succeeded by William Parrott
Trade union offices
Preceded by John Dixon	General Secretary of the West Yorkshire Miners' Association; 1876–1881	Succeeded by Position abolished
Preceded by New position	General Secretary of the Yorkshire Miners' Association; 1881–1904	Succeeded by William Parrott
Preceded by Joseph Hope and George Davy Kelley	Auditor of the Trades Union Congress; 1886; With: T. J. Elvidge	Succeeded by John Judge and Thomas Sharples
Preceded by John Judge and Thomas Sharples	Auditor of the Trades Union Congress; 1888; With: John Fielding	Succeeded by J. T. Morrison and W. H. Lambton
Preceded by New position	President of the Miners' Federation of Great Britain; 1889–1904	Succeeded by Enoch Edwards
