= George Sylvester =

English politician

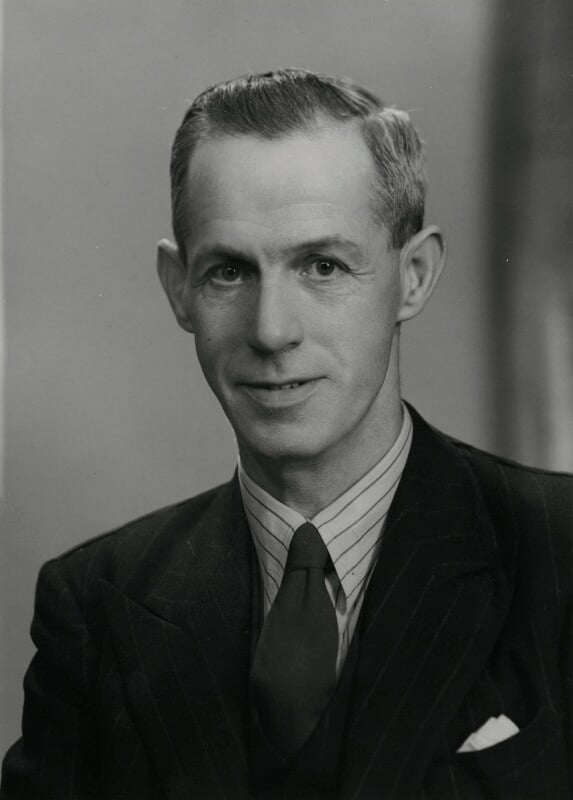
- Sylvester in 1949

Member of Parliament for Pontefract
- In office 1950–1961
- Preceded by: Percy Barstow
- Succeeded by: Joseph Harper

Member of Parliament for Normanton
- In office 1941–1950
- Preceded by: Tom Smith
- Succeeded by: Albert Roberts

Personal details
- Born: George Oscar Sylvester; 14 September 1898 Yorkshire, England
- Died: 26 October 1961 (aged 63)
- Party: Labour Party
- Profession: Miner, politician

George Oscar Sylvester (14 September 1898 – 26 October 1961) was a Labour Party politician in England.

He was elected as Member of Parliament (MP) for Normanton in West Yorkshire at a by-election in 1947 following the resignation of the Labour MP Tom Smith.

Before going into politics, he was a miner. At the 1950 general election, he was returned for the neighbouring Pontefract constituency, and held the seat until he died in office aged 63. At the 1962 Pontefract by-election held following his death, the seat was held for Labour by Joe Harper.

Parliament of the United Kingdom
Preceded by Tom Smith	Member of Parliament for Normanton; 1947–1950	Succeeded by Thomas Brooks
Preceded by Percy Barstow	Member of Parliament for Pontefract; 1950–1961	Succeeded by Joe Harper
