= Sam Bullough =

British trade unionist

Sam Bullough (1909 – January 1973) was a British trade unionist.

Bullough was elected vice-president of the Yorkshire Area of the National Union of Mineworkers in 1954, and then became its president in 1960. In 1963, he was also elected as national vice-president of the union.

His sudden death left the post of president vacant, to be taken by the compensation agent, Arthur Scargill.

Trade union offices
Preceded by Alwyn Machen	President of the Yorkshire Area of the National Union of Mineworkers; 1960–1973	Succeeded by Arthur Scargill
Preceded by Fred Collindridge	Vice President of the National Union of Mineworkers; 1963–1969	Succeeded by Sid Schofield
