= 1962 Pontefract by-election =

UK Parliamentary by-election

The 1962 Pontefract by-election was held on 22 March 1962 following the death of the incumbent Labour MP George Sylvester. It was retained by the Labour candidate Joseph Harper.

Pontefract by-election, 1962
| Party | Candidate | Votes | % | ±% |
|---|---|---|---|---|
| Labour | Joseph Harper | 26,461 | 77.28 | +0.90 |
| Conservative | Paul Dean | 6,633 | 19.37 | −4.25 |
| Independent | Russell Ernest Eckley | 1,146 | 3.35 | New |
| Majority | | 19,828 | 57.91 | +5.15 |
| Turnout | | 34,240 | 63.26 | −21.01 |
| Labour hold | | Swing | | |
