= Tom Smith (British politician) =

English politician

Tom Smith (24 April 1886 – 27 February 1953) was a Labour Party politician in England.

At the 1922 general election, he was elected as Member of Parliament (MP) for the previously Liberal-held seat of Pontefract in West Yorkshire. He was re-elected at the 1923 election, but at the 1924 general election he lost his seat by 701 votes to the Conservative candidate Christopher Brooke. He was re-elected at the 1929 general election, but was defeated again at the 1931 general election.

He returned to the House of Commons at an uncontested by-election in August 1933, in the neighbouring Normanton constituency, following the death of the Labour MP Frederick Hall. He held the seat until he resigned his seat in 1946 to take up the post of Labour Director of the North-Eastern Divisional Coal Board. At the resulting 1947 Normanton by-election, the seat was held for Labour by George Sylvester.

Parliament of the United Kingdom
Preceded by Walter Forrest	Member of Parliament for Pontefract; 1922–1924	Succeeded by Christopher Brooke
Preceded by Christopher Brooke	Member of Parliament for Pontefract; 1929–1931	Succeeded by Thomas Sotheron-Estcourt
Preceded by Frederick Hall	Member of Parliament for Normanton; 1933–1947	Succeeded by George Sylvester
