= Sidney Ford =

British trade union leader

Sir Sidney Ford MBE
- Born: Sidney William George Ford; 29 August 1909; Edmonton, London, England
- Died: 13 August 1983 (aged 73); Palmers Green, Winchmore Hill, London, England
- Occupation: Trade union leader
- Known for: President of the National Union of Mineworkers (1960–1971)

Sir Sidney Ford, MBE (29 August 1909–13 August 1983) was a British trade union leader.

== Career ==
Sidney William George Ford was born in Edmonton, London. Ford began working for the Miners' Federation of Great Britain (MFGB) in 1925. He received his knighthood for his work on Lord Devlin's Docks Inquiry and other T.U.C. (trade union congress). He never worked as a miner, but became Secretary of the Colliery Officials and Staffs Area of the union. He was known for his loyalty to the Labour Party and his opposition to the union's left-wing.

The MFGB was refounded as the National Union of Mineworkers. Its president-elect, Alwyn Machen, died suddenly in March 1960, the same month he was elected. A new presidential election was held, and Ford stood against Alex Moffat, a Scottish communist. He retired in 1971. For a number of years prior to his death he suffered from Parkinson's disease, and died as a result of this on 13 August 1983 aged 73. He died in Palmers Green, Winchmore Hill, London N.21.

== Perceived failures ==
Ford's period as leadership was marked by mass pit closures and relatively little resistance. His successor, Joe Gormley, wrote in his autobiography that this passivity led many mineworkers to distrust the white-collar COSA section of the union, which influenced the lack of support for the moderate Trevor Bell, who ran against Arthur Scargill for the leadership in 1981.

Trade union offices
Preceded by James Shearer?	Secretary of the Colliery Officials and Staffs Area of the National Union of Mineworkers; 1951–1960	Succeeded by Cliff Shephard
Preceded by Alwyn Machen	President of the National Union of Mineworkers; 1960–1971	Succeeded by Joe Gormley
