= Albert Roberts (British politician) =

British politician

Member of Parliament for Normanton
- In office 25 October 1951 – 13 May 1983
- Preceded by: Thomas Brooks
- Succeeded by: Bill O'Brien

Personal details
- Born: 14 May 1908
- Died: 11 May 2000 (aged 91)
- Party: Labour

Albert Roberts (14 May 1908 – 11 May 2000) was a British Labour politician.

== Early years ==
Roberts was born and grew up in the village of Woodlesford near Leeds. He followed his father into coal mining at Water Haigh colliery at the age of 14 and then took night school courses at Whitwood Technical College. He eventually qualified as a mining engineer and became mines inspector for the Yorkshire Safety Board 1941–51. He was elected a Labour councillor on Rothwell Urban District Council 1937–51, serving as chair in 1948.

== Parliamentary career ==
Roberts was Member of Parliament for Normanton from 1951 to 1983 and was sponsored by the National Union of Mineworkers. His career was controversial for his support for Francisco Franco, his relationship with the corrupt architect John Poulson and his regular votes in favour of capital punishment. His successor was Bill O'Brien.

== Personal life ==
He was vice-chairman of the British branch of the Inter-Parliamentary Union.

== See also ==
- Times Guide to the House of Commons, 1966 and 1979
- Leigh Rayment's Historical List of MPs

Parliament of the United Kingdom
Preceded by Thomas Brooks	Member of Parliament for Normanton; 1951–1983	Succeeded by Bill O'Brien
