= Attorney General Brooke =

Attorney General Brooke may refer to:

- Edward Brooke (1919–2015), Attorney General of Massachusetts
- Robert Brooke (Virginia governor) (1760–1800), Attorney General of Virginia

== See also ==
- General Brooke (disambiguation)
