= Joe Hall (trade unionist) =

Joseph Arthur Hall (26 July 1887 – 28 May 1964) was a British trade unionist.

== Early life ==
Born in Lundhill, near Wombwell in the West Riding of Yorkshire, Hall left school at the age of eleven and began working underground at Darfield Main Colliery, lying about his age as legally only children twelve or older could work underground.

Hall moved to Cortonwood Colliery in 1900, but was laid off in 1903 as the pit closed due to a fire. He began working as a "trimmer", transporting materials, at Wombwell Main, then returned to Cortonwood when it re-opened, becoming a collier at the age of twenty.

== Trade unionism ==
Hall was active in the Yorkshire Miners' Association (YMA), and attended a 1915 conference in London on its behalf. He was influenced by David Lloyd George's speech urging increases in production and led attempts to achieve this at his pit during World War I.

In 1916, Hall was elected as secretary of the Cortonwood branch of the YMA, then as the pit's checkweighman in 1917. He was also elected for the Labour Party to Wombwell Urban District Council in 1920 serving until his death. In 1922, colliery officials had him removed as checkweighman, as they objected to him holding the post jointly with his union position, but he was instead elected as a Safety Inspector. In 1925, he gave up his local posts to become full-time financial secretary of the YMA, and from 1930 also served on the executive of the Miners Federation of Great Britain, where he was known for occupying a middle position between communists and right-wingers. He served on the enquiry into the Gresford disaster, and was involved in rescue attempts in several other mine accidents.

Hall was appointed by the Trades Union Congress as its delegate to the American Federation of Labour for 1932/33, and he took advantage of the opportunity to tour the United States; among other engagements, he spoke alongside F. D. Roosevelt. Back in the UK, he was one of the strongest opponents of George Alfred Spencer's Nottinghamshire Miners' Industrial Union, and his increased prominent led him to election as president of the YMA in 1939, following the death of Herbert Smith.

Hall was made an Officer of the Order of the British Empire in 1946, and retired in 1952.

Trade union offices
| Preceded by John Hoskin | Financial Secretary of the Yorkshire Miners' Association; 1925–1939 | Succeeded by Tom Oakey |
| Preceded by Charles Dukes and Bill Holmes | Trades Union Congress representative to the American Federation of Labour; 1933; With: Jimmy Rowan | Succeeded by John Stokes and Alexander Walkden |
| Preceded by Herbert Smith | President of the Yorkshire Miners' Association; 1939–1952 | Succeeded by Alwyn Machen |
