= General Union of Carpenters and Joiners =

Former trade union of the United Kingdom

The General Union of Carpenters and Joiners (GUC&J) was a trade union in the United Kingdom.

The union was founded in 1827 by the amalgamation of various local societies in London. Originally named the Friendly Society of Operative House Carpenters and Joiners of Great Britain and Ireland, in 1863 it was renamed as the Friendly Operative Carpenters and Joiners General Union of Great Britain, and was thereafter universally known as the "General Union of Carpenters and Joiners".

The union's influence variedly greatly over its existence. In 1832, it had only 938 members, but this grew to 6,774 only two years later. It then affiliated to the Operative Builders' Union, while remaining independent; it only just survived the collapse of the Operative Builders, and had a mere 536 members in 1850.

In 1861, the union's general secretary, Thomas Skinner, was imprisoned. In the aftermath, several branches joined the new Amalgamated Society of Carpenters and Joiners (ASC&J). Although membership of the General Union recovered, a 53-week strike by the Manchester branch in 1877 drained funds and led many more members to defect to the ASC&J. By 1883, it had 1,750 members, less than a tenth the membership of the ASC&J. That year, William Matkin was elected as general secretary, and rapidly increased membership, which reached 9,000 in 1900. However, many of the new members paid a very low rate of subscriptions and as a result were not eligible for most of the membership benefits.

During the 1900s and 1910s, the ASC&J repeatedly proposed a merger with the GUC&J, but was rebuffed. However, Matkin died in 1920, and the union agreed to a merger the following year, which formed the Amalgamated Society of Woodworkers.

== General Secretaries ==
1850s: Thomas Skinner
1862: Robert Last
1876: Charles Matkin
1883: William Matkin
1920: T. R. Jones
