= Edward Cowey =

British trade unionist (1839–1903)

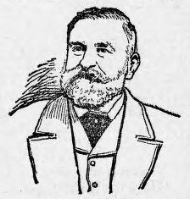
Cowey in 1895

Edward Cowey (9 April 1839 – 16 December 1903), often known as Ned Cowey, was a British trade unionist.

Cowey was born in Longbenton, Northumberland, and began working in local coal mines at the age of seven, opening and closing a trapdoor for fourteen hours a day. In 1858, he and his workmates were able to work together to break the written agreement of working practices, for which he was blacklisted. He briefly worked at sea, but returned to Monkwearmouth, where again he made efforts to improve working conditions.

In an effort to find further work, Cowey moved to Sharlston in the West Riding of Yorkshire in 1871, and was elected as checkweighman. There, he joined the West Yorkshire Miners' Association (WYMA), and was elected president in 1873, then served in the post again from 1876. In 1881, the WYMA merged with the South Yorkshire Miners' Association to form the Yorkshire Miners' Association, and Cowey was appointed as its first president.

Cowey was also a member of the board of the Miners' National Union, and when the Miners' Federation of Great Britain was formed in 1889, Cowey was elected to its committee. In 1893, he was elected to the Parliamentary Committee of the Trades Union Congress, where he was a prominent opponent of socialism.

In his spare time, Cowey was a Primitive Methodist lay preacher.

Trade union offices
| Preceded by ? | President of the West Yorkshire Miners' Association; 1874 | Succeeded by ? |
| Preceded by William Parrott | President of the West Yorkshire Miners' Association; 1876–1881 | Succeeded by Position abolished |
| Preceded by New position | President of the Yorkshire Miners' Association; 1881–1903 | Succeeded by John Wadsworth |
| Preceded by David Holmes | Chairman of the Parliamentary Committee of the Trades Union Congress; 1895 | Succeeded by Will Thorne |
| Preceded by John Burns and David Holmes | Trades Union Congress representative to the American Federation of Labour; 1895; With: James Mawdsley | Succeeded by John Mallinson and Sam Woods |
