= John Dixon (trade unionist) =

British trade unionist (1828–1876)

John Dixon (24 May 1828 – 8 April 1876) was a British trade unionist.

Born in Briestfield in the West Riding of Yorkshire, Dixon attended a Sunday School at which his father was the superintendent. His mother died when he was seven, and he then began working with his father underground at a coal mine. His father died seven years later, and Dixon then moved to Gomersal, where he continued working as a miner.

In Gomersal, Dixon attended classes at the mechanics' institution, and in 1844 heard David Swallow speak about trade unionism. He decided to emulate Swallow, and founded a local trade union. He married in 1850, and soon moved to Drighlington, where he became secretary of the local miners' union. This became part of the Adwalton and Drighlington Miners' Association, which undertook a major strike in 1862. Dixon advised against strike action, but was defeated in a vote. The strike was unsuccessful, leading to a wage reduction of 30% and the victimisation of the union leaders; although Dixon travelled the district in an attempt to find work, he could not find a colliery willing to employ him. Only fifteen months later did he finally find work at Snydale.

The Adwalton and Drighlington union had been largely destroyed by the 1862 strike, but Dixon was able to partially rebuild it, and in 1866 took it into a merger with the West Yorkshire Miners' Association (WYMA). In exchange, he was employed as assistant secretary of the WYMA for three days a week, and in January 1867, he was elected as full-time secretary of the union. He moved to Methley, then later to Normanton, to manage the union's affairs, and in Normanton was also elected as chairman of the school board in 1873.

Dixon was also active in the Miners' National Union, and gave evidence to the 1873 Select Committee on Coal. He died in 1876, still in office.

Trade union offices
Preceded by William Brown	Secretary of the West Yorkshire Miners' Association; 1867–1876	Succeeded by Benjamin Pickard
