= William Brown (miner) =

Miner and trade unionist

William Brown (1824 or 1825 – 21 September 1900) was a British coal miner who became a prominent trade unionist.

Born in Rothwell, West Yorkshire, Brown worked as a coalminer from the age of ten. He settled in Hunslet, near Leeds, working at Waterloo Colliery near Thorpe Stapleton. In March 1858 when the West Yorkshire coal owners implemented a 15% wage cut, the miners at Waterloo came out on strike and were supported by a levy raised from men at nearby pits. In September, the owners closed all the collieries throughout the West Yorkshire coalfield and introduced a lockout. Brown was one of the platform speakers at a large rally of miners on Woodhouse Moor, Leeds, called to protest the lockout. A few years later, Brown was sacked for his activity on behalf of the West Yorkshire Miners' Association (WYMA). Unable to find work in the mines, he became a greengrocer, and also earned money as a singer at a Methodist New Connexion chapel. In 1863, following wage cuts, the WYMA was re-established, and employed Brown as its secretary and agent. While in this role, he was probably responsible for compiling and publishing the Miners' Hymn Book. When he held union meetings, they were opened and closed with songs from the book.

Brown was also active in the Miners' National Association (MNA), and in 1866 it sent him as the full-time organiser for the Derbyshire and Nottinghamshire Miners' Association. In 1867, members of the union at several mines objected to having their hours increased, and went on an unofficial strike. Although Brown initially discouraged this, he made the strike official as it spread to other pits. However, the union was unable to fund strike pay for so many miners, and eventually the strike collapsed, taking with it much of the union's membership.

In 1869, Brown was appointed by the MNA as the agent for the new North Staffordshire Miners' Federation. There, he was able to rapidly increase membership, which was more than 12,000 by 1871. Under his leadership, the union affiliated to the Amalgamated Association of Miners (AAM). Drawing on his experiences from previous posts, he always advocated arbitration in disputes rather than strikes, but when a strike occurred, he supported it. Brown was an accomplished public speaker and addressed many large gatherings in his role as a miners agent. By 1874, coal prices had fallen, and Brown received criticism for not taking a cut in his own wages. Some lodges left the federation, but Brown kept the majority of the union together, reorienting it back towards the MNA and strongly criticising the now-disintegrating AAM.

In 1875, Brown was elected to the General Council of the Trades Union Congress, but following protests that he belonged to the same trade as another member, he withdrew before the council was constituted.

Trade union offices
Preceded by John Pickles	Secretary of the West Yorkshire Miners' Association; 1863–1866	Succeeded by John Dixon
Preceded by New position	Secretary of the North Staffordshire Miners' Federation; 1869–1874	Succeeded by James Hand
