= Samuel Roebuck =

British trade unionist (1871–1924)

Samuel Roebuck (17 April 1871 – 23 April 1924) was a British trade unionist.

Born in Attercliffe in Sheffield, Roebck moved with his parents to Wombwell in 1876. There, he studied at the Low Valley Wesleyan Day School until he was twelve, when he left to work at Mitchell's Main Colliery. After filling a variety of roles, he moved to Darfield Main Colliery, becoming a hewer at the age of twenty.

In his spare time, Roebuck was a Sunday school teacher and a Primitive Methodist preacher. He was also active in the Yorkshire Miners' Association (YMA), elected as the Darfield Main delegate at the age of nineteen, then branch secretary in 1902. In 1912, he was elected as Junior General Secretary of the YMA, moving to Barnsley to work full-time in the post. John Wadsworth, the general secretary, became ill, and Roebuck effectively filled the post, and was unanimously elected to it in 1923, following Wadsworth's death.

Roebuck also represented the YMA on the Miners' Federation of Great Britain, and unsuccessfully stood to become its general secretary in 1919. He also served on Wombwell Urban District Council from 1904 to 1907. He was selected as the Labour Party candidate for Doncaster at the general election expected in 1914, but after the outbreak of World War I caused it to be postponed, he stood down. He increasingly suffered poor health, and died in 1924 aged 53.

Trade union offices
Preceded by John Wadsworth	General Secretary of the Yorkshire Miners' Association; 1923–1924	Succeeded by Joseph Jones
