= National Federation of Colliery Officials =

Former trade union of the United Kingdom

- Founded: December 1919
- Headquarters: 58 Station Road, Sutton in Ashfield
- Location: United Kingdom
- Members: 18,980 (1979); 24 (2017)
- Key people: Sidney Ford (Gen Sec)
- Parent organization: National Union of Mineworkers (from 1947)
- Website: num.org.uk/cosa

The National Federation of Colliery Officials was a trade union representing colliery workers in the United Kingdom who were not involved in manual labour.

The federation was established in December 1919 by local unions of colliery officials, with the most important being the Northern Colliery Officials' Mutual Association, founded in 1914, and the Lancashire and Cheshire Colliery Officials' Association. It soon had six smaller affiliates, including Consett, the Forest of Dean Colliery Examiners', Overmen, and Shot Firers' Association, the Midland Mining Officials' Association, the Somerset Colliery Officials' Association, and Yorkshire.

The federation received recognition from colliery owners in 1920, and quickly negotiated a national agreement on pay and conditions for colliery officials and clerks. By 1936, the membership of the federation was described as "surveyors, under-managers, overmen, master wastemen, electricians and engineers, surface foremen, screening plant foremen, and clerks". About three-quarters of its members were based in Durham and Northumberland, with the third-largest district being Lancashire, which housed its office, in Bolton.

By the 1940s, the federation was known as the National Federation of Colliery Officials and Staffs, reflecting its broader membership, and in 1945 it affiliated to the Trades Union Congress (TUC), with a membership of 8,183, of whom 120 were women.

When the mining industry was nationalised, in 1947, the National Union of Mineworkers (NUM) sought to unite all workers in the industry. Members of the federation voted heavily in favour of joining the NUM, and did so on 1 January 1947, becoming the Colliery Officials and Staffs Area (COSA). Two smaller, independent unions of colliery officials voted against joining the NUM. The TUC brokered a deal whereby national level clerical staff would transfer to the Clerical and Administrative Workers' Union, and divisional level clerical staff to the Transport and General Workers' Union, and this satisfied the smaller unions so that they dissolved, dividing their members between the new NUM section and the two other unions.

As employment in the mining industry declined, COSA became an increasingly important section of the NUM; by 1979, it had 18,980 members out of a total NUM membership of around 250,000. The section survives, and as of 2017, had 24 members.

== General Secretaries ==
1919: Thomas Halstead
c.1940: James Shearer
1951: Sidney Ford
1960: Cliff Shephard
1970s: Les Storey
1979: Trevor Bell
1989: Ken Hollingsworth
