= William Matkin =

British trade unionist

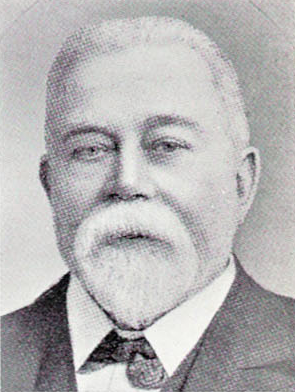
Matkin, while in office

William Matkin (1845–1920) was a British trade unionist.

Born in Caythorpe in Lincolnshire, Matkin joined the General Union of Carpenters and Joiners (GUCJ) in 1864, and gradually rose to prominence, being elected to the Parliamentary Committee of the Trades Union Congress (TUC) in 1871, and as general secretary of his union in 1883. In order to take up the post, he moved to Liverpool, where he devoted much of his time to the Liverpool Trades Council. In 1890, the TUC was held in the city, and he was elected as its President. Active in the trade union movement to the end of his life, he also served on the Parliamentary Committee in 1890 and 1891, and from 1911 until 1915.

Matkin was a leading supporter of the Labour Electoral Association, which aimed to secure the election of Liberal-Labour candidates: working men who stood for the Liberal Party. He also served as a magistrate.

Trade union offices
Preceded by Charles Matkin	General Secretary of the General Union of Carpenters and Joiners; 1876–1920	Succeeded by T. R. Jones
Preceded by Robert Ritchie	President of the Trades Union Congress; 1890	Succeeded by Thomas Burt
Preceded by William Parrott and William Henry Wilkinson	Auditor of the Trades Union Congress; 1897; With: William Henry Wilkinson	Succeeded by William Parrott and William Henry Wilkinson
