= Ingham Brooke =

The Ven Joshua Ingham Brooke (14 February 1836 – 19 June 1906) was Archdeacon of Halifax from 1888 until his death.

== Life ==
Brooke was born in Honley, the son of Thomas Brooke, a wealthy manufacturer. He was educated at Cheltenham College and University College. He was ordained deacon in 1860, and priest in 1862. After curacies in Retford and Batheaston he was the Incumbent at Easthope from 1866 to 1867; Thornhill from 1867 until 1888 (also Rural Dean of Dewsbury from 1871); and then of Halifax from 1889 to 1904.

== Family ==
Brook married Grace Charlotte Godby in 1859. They had three sons; among the sons was Christopher Robert Ingham Brooke. The other sons were William Ingham (born 1862) and Edward Vanrenen Ingham (born 1877); their six daughters were Margaret (born 1860, married Frederick Ralph Grenside), Emily Mary (born 1864, married George Alexander Grenside), Edith (born 1865), Grace Millicent (born 1867), Mabel (born 1873) and Barbara Joan (born 1880).

Sir Thomas Brooke, 1st Baronet, Ingham Brooke's brother, was made a baronet in 1899.
