= Robert Last (trade unionist) =

British trade unionist

Robert Last (11 September 1829 – 1898) was a British trade unionist.

Born in Norwich, Last left school at the age of fifteen and completed an apprenticeship as a builder. In 1856, he moved to Manchester, having heard that higher wages were available there. Once he arrived, he joined the General Union of Carpenters and Joiners (GUC&J), and soon became secretary of his local lodge.

The headquarters of the GUC&J rotated between various cities, and each in turn elected a general secretary. In 1862, when it was Manchester's turn, the union was in crisis. The previous general secretary, Thomas Skinner, had been imprisoned, and many of the union's branches had defected to the rival Amalgamated Society of Carpenters and Joiners. Last was elected as secretary, on a platform of reorganisation. He persuaded members to accept new rules and benefits, and a new system where all union members voted for the secretary. On that basis, he was repeatedly re-elected, but was forced to move to Bristol in 1868 and Birmingham in 1872, as the headquarters continued to rotate.

Last was firmly opposed to the ASC&J, and also to the Junta. He worked closely with George Potter to maintain a reputation for being more radical than the ASC&J, and established new lodges around the country. By 1876, when he stood down, membership of the union had reached a record of 11,841, although this fell away rapidly after his departure.

In his spare time, Last was a keen butterfly collector.

Trade union offices
Preceded by Thomas Skinner	General Secretary of the General Union of Carpenters and Joiners; 1862 – 1876	Succeeded by Charles Matkin
