= Thomas Sharples =

British trade unionist

Thomas Sharples (1819 – 1905) was a British trade unionist.

Sharples completed an apprenticeship as a house painter and found work in Manchester with the London and North Western Railway. He was active in a local trade union, and in 1856 he persuaded both it and a rival painters' society in the city to join a new alliance, which became known as the Manchester Alliance of Operative House Painters. This rapidly spread across the country, and in 1860 Sharples became the union's treasurer. This involved little work, as almost the funds were held and administered by branches; only a small strike fund was centrally administered.

In 1866, the union's general secretary, William MacDonald, was accused of neglecting his office, and sidelined in a new post of honorary secretary. Sharples was appointed as his replacement, and immediately began issuing regular reports on the progress of the society. However, he made no other changes to the very loose alliance, which resulted in large fluctuations in its membership as branches joined and left. Despite this, the general trend was upwards, with 58 branches in 1866 rising to 72 by 1874.

Sharples was also active at the Trades Union Congress, and was an auditor of the congress in 1883 and 1887. However, by this point the union was struggling, membership falling to only 1,863 and 35 branches by 1888. That year, the General Council began issuing circulars claiming that Sharples was incompetent, ignoring letters and sometimes giving illegal advice, while the Executive Council issued circulars defending him. By 1890, he had also lost the confidence of the executive and was persuaded to resign.

Trade union offices
Preceded by William MacDonald	General Secretary of the Manchester Alliance of Operative House Painters; 1866–1890	Succeeded by George Sunley
Preceded by George Sedgwick and Peter Shorrocks	Auditor of the Trades Union Congress; 1883; With: James Millar Jack	Succeeded by Thomas Ashton and John Wilson
Preceded by T. J. Elvidge and Benjamin Pickard	Auditor of the Trades Union Congress; 1887; With: John Judge	Succeeded by John Fielding and Benjamin Pickard
