= Armthorpe Academy =

Location
- Mere Lane; Armthorpe; Doncaster, South Yorkshire, DN3 2DA; England; 53.5400°N 1.0612°W

Information
- Former name: The Armthorpe School
- Type: Academy
- Motto: Ambition, Respect, Responsibility, Pride
- Established: 1842
- Specialist: Arts and Sports College
- Department for Education URN: 138314 Tables
- Ofsted: Reports
- Head teacher: David Bisley
- Gender: Mixed
- Age: 11 to 16
- Enrolment: 526
- Capacity: 900
- Colours: Black and White
- Website: www.armthorpeacademy.org.uk

The Armthorpe Academy (formerly Armthorpe School) is a secondary school located in Armthorpe, Doncaster, England. It has approximately 770 pupils, serves the former mining village of Armthorpe, and is situated 3 miles (5 km) to the east of Doncaster and less than 2 miles (3 km) west from Junction 4 of the M18 motorway. The school is run by Consilium Academies.

== History ==
The school was opened in 1842 as a National school, and was converted into an Academy in 2012.
