= Christopher Brooke (British Army officer) =

British soldier and politician

Brigadier-General Christopher Booke CMG DSO
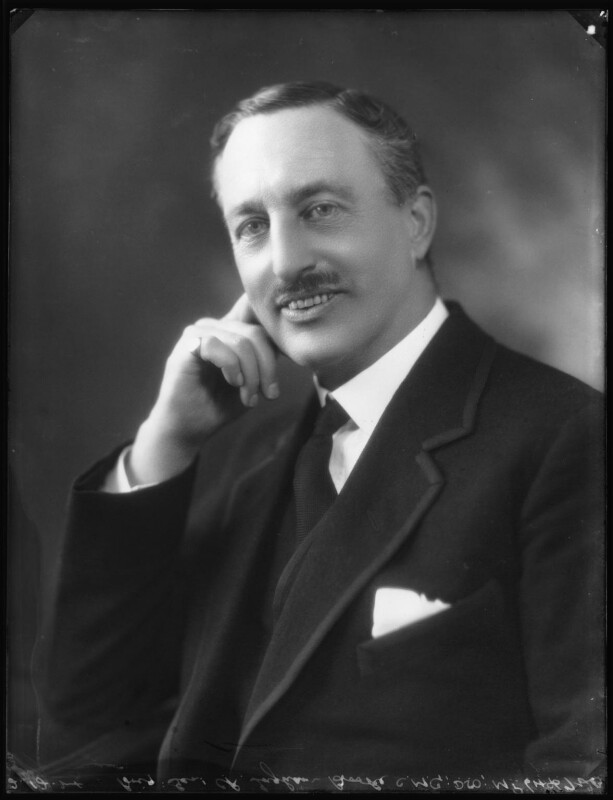
- Brooke in 1924
- Born: Christopher Robert Ingham Brooke; 4 July 1869; Thornhill, West Riding of Yorkshire, England
- Died: 28 December 1948 (aged 79) George, Cape Province, South Africa

Brigadier-General Christopher Robert Ingham Brooke, CMG, DSO (4 July 1869 – 28 December 1948) was a British Army officer and Conservative MP for Pontefract from 1924 to 1929.

He was born in Thornhill, Yorkshire in 1869, the son of Ingham Brooke, and was educated at Winchester College.

Brooke was a major when he fought in the Second Boer War, where he was in command of 2nd Mounted infantry, which in 1902 was based in the Transvaal Colony. He later fought in the First World War, and received the DSO in 1915. He was made a Companion of the Order of St Michael and St George in the 1917 New Year Honours, and retired as brigadier-general.

From 1924 to 1935 Brooke was Honorary Colonel of the 5th Battalion, King's Own Yorkshire Light Infantry. He died at George, Cape Province, South Africa in 1948.

Parliament of the United Kingdom
Preceded by Tom Smith	Member of Parliament for Pontefract; 1924 – 1929	Succeeded by Tom Smith
