= 1905 Normanton by-election =

UK parliamentary by-election

The 1905 Normanton by-election was held on 27 November 1905 after the incumbent Liberal-Labour MP William Parrott died. The seat was retained by the Liberal-Labour candidate Frederick Hall. Hall was a local councilor and chairman of the Rawmarsh School Board. who was sponsored by the Miners Federation of Great Britain and would in 1909 take the Labour whip. Hall was unopposed.
