= Herbert Smith (trade unionist) =

British trade unionist and miner

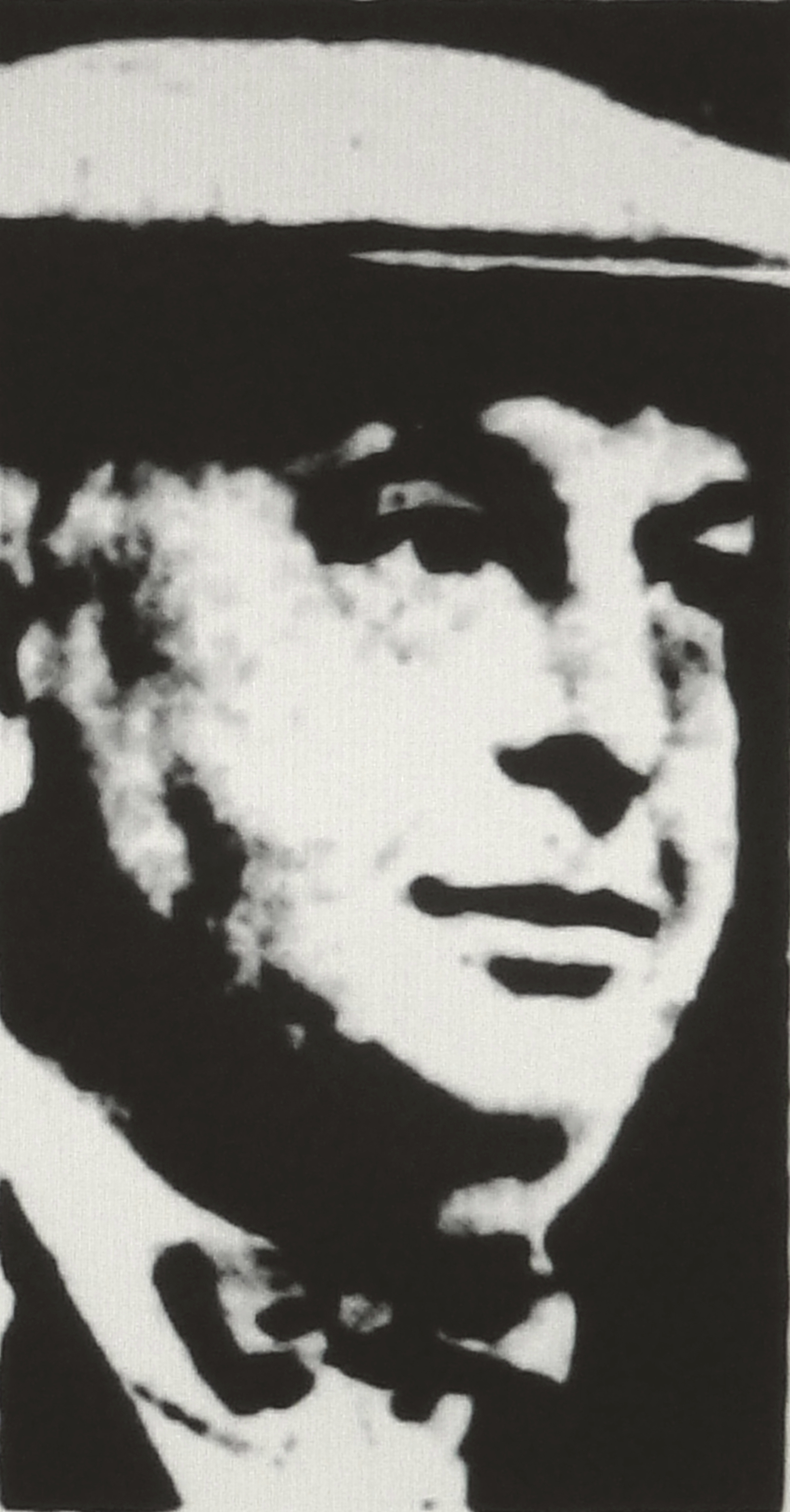
Herbert Smith, 1933

Herbert Smith (17 July 1862 – 16 June 1938) was a British trade unionist and miner.

Born in Kippax, West Yorkshire, Smith was orphaned at a young age and spent time in a workhouse before being adopted by a local couple, one of whom was a miner. He later said that he never went to school. Smith then studied in Glasshoughton and Pontefract, and began working as a miner at the age of ten. Smith became active in his union, being elected to the branch committee at the age of seventeen, then in 1894 becoming a checkweighman. In 1896 he became Chairman of Castleford Trades Council, and in 1906 he became President of the Yorkshire Miners' Association. He joined the Independent Labour Party, and was elected to the West Riding County Council in 1903, and stood unsuccessfully for the Labour Party in Morley at the December 1910 general election. He was later elected as a councillor in Barnsley.

Smith was also involved in the Miners' International Federation, serving as president from 1921 until 1929, and in Miners' Federation of Great Britain (MFGB), becoming its president in 1922. He was active in support of the UK general strike of 1926, but resigned as MFGB President in 1929, objecting to the organisation's agreement to lengthen miners' hours. Despite standing for re-election to the post in 1930 and 1931, he was unsuccessful, but he did serve as Mayor of Barnsley in 1932.

Smith became nationally known for leading rescue efforts following mining disasters, starting with the Wellington Pit Disaster in Whitehaven in 1910, and including the Bentley Pit Disaster of 1931 and the Wharncliffe Woodmoor Colliery Disaster of 1936.

== Bibliography ==
- Lawson J. J. (1941) The Man in the Cap: The Life of Herbert Smith London: Methuen & co.

Trade union offices
Preceded by John Wadsworth	Vice-President of the Yorkshire Miners' Association; 1904–1906	Succeeded by John Guest
Preceded by John Wadsworth	President of the Yorkshire Miners' Association; 1906–1938	Succeeded by Joe Hall
Preceded by William House	Vice-President of the Miners' Federation of Great Britain; 1917–1922	Succeeded by Stephen Walsh
Preceded by Robert Smillie	President of the Miners' International Federation; 1921–1929	Succeeded by Joseph Dejardin
Preceded by Robert Smillie	President of the Miners' Federation of Great Britain; 1922–1929	Succeeded by Thomas Richards
Preceded by J. H. Thomas and James Walker	Trades Union Congress representative to the American Federation of Labour; 1922; With: Edward L. Poulton	Succeeded by William C. Robinson and Robert Barrie Walker
