= West Yorkshire Miners' Association =

Former trade union of the United Kingdom

- Merged into: Yorkshire Miners' Association
- Founded: 29 March 1858
- Dissolved: 1 July 1881
- Headquarters: 1 Arundel Street, Wakefield
- Location: United Kingdom
- Members: 12,379 (1874)
- Affiliations: Miners' National Union

The West Yorkshire Miners' Association (WYMA) was an early British trade union representing coal miners in the central part of the West Riding of Yorkshire.

== History ==
The union was founded in 1858, following a cut in miners' wages which led many to go on strike. It was initially divided into two districts: Wakefield and Methley; and Leeds. The new union provided a formal structure to support strikers, and all miners in the district found themselves out of work after 7 October, when colliery owners agreed a general lock-out. The union tried to negotiate a settlement, but the colliery owners refused to meet with them. Public opinion turned against the employers, and during November and December the mines reopened, agreeing to take the miners back on with smaller wage reductions, the repeal of some of the most unpopular rules of work, and to permit miners to remain members of the union.

Strengthened by the successful industrial action, the WYMA tried to organise a national union. Although conferences took place in Leeds and Ashton-under-Lyne, no permanent arrangement was made. Instead, a period of industrial peace in the district led to a lack of interest in the union, which became moribund by 1861. However, renewed wage cuts in 1862 led to a revival the following year. This new union succeeded in minimising wage cuts and maintaining conditions. It also organised a national miners' conference in November 1863 which finally founded the Miners' National Union.

The union remained in existence, but undertook little activity. In 1866, the small Adwalton and Drighlington Miners' Association merged into the WYMA, with its secretary, John Dixon, becoming assistant secretary of the WYMA, then secretary the following year, and membership reaching a peak of nearly 4,000. A boom in the price of coal enabled it to build up some reserves, but a large number of miners in Morley left the union, and further lock-outs left other miners unable to sustain membership. By 1870, the union had only 480 members, and was kept afloat only by a loan of £100 from the South Yorkshire Miners' Association (SYMA). In 1871, the WYMA proposed amalgamation with the SYMA, but the SYMA rejected the idea.

Another recovery in the price of coal enable the union to successfully campaign for wage increases and some improvements in working conditions. This led more miners to join the union, and in 1873 it was able to again employ an assistant secretary, Benjamin Pickard winning the post by an overwhelming majority of votes. It increased benefits for ill and injured miners, and financially supported Thomas Burt and Alexander Macdonald's campaigns in the 1874 UK general election. By this time, membership had reached a new peak of 12,379. A lock-out from October to December was resolved by arbitration organised by the union.

Dixon died in 1876, and Pickard succeeded him as secretary. Low coal prices led to hardship among miners over the next few years, but there was relative industrial peace until 1878, when colliery owners unilaterally decided to introduce riddles, filtering coal dust from mined material and therefore reducing the weight of each cartload - a major issue for miners who were paid by weight. The union negotiated a bonus of 1.5d per ton for riddled coal. In an attempt to increase membership, miners were allowed to become members immediately on their first payment of dues, although they did not gain union benefits until they had at least thirteen weeks of continuous membership.

In 1880, the union agreed to a sliding scale of wages, linked to the average selling price of coal, hoping that this would reduce conflict, and lead to increased wages if, as expected, coal prices went up. But these hopes were not fulfilled, as wages were instead reduced by 2.5% in October, and some colleries imposed greater reductions, arguing that they would otherwise have to close. Wages did not change at the end of the year, and increased again by only 2.5% in April 1881.

By 1881, the SYMA was in financial difficulties, and it finally agreed to merge with the WYMA. The new organisation was formally established on 1 July 1881 as the Yorkshire Miners' Association.

== General Secretaries ==
1858: John Pickles
1863: William Brown
1867: John Dixon
1876: Benjamin Pickard

== President ==
1863: John Toft
1874: Edward Cowey
1874:
1876: William Parrott
1876: Edward Cowey
