= John Judge (trade unionist) =

British trade unionist (1849/1850–1916)

John Judge (1849 or 1850 – 7 October 1916) was a British trade unionist, who was prominent in the Leeds labour movement, and briefly served as president of his union.

== Biography ==
Judge worked as a shoemaker, and by 1883 was secretary of the Leeds branch of the National Union of Boot and Shoe Rivetters and Finishers (NUBSRF). That year, the union planned to require members to be paid for piece work, and to expel any who accepted day wages. Judge successfully argued that day wages were common in Leeds, and that the union should only prohibit members from moving from piece work on to day wages. In 1890, he persuaded the union to accept day pay as the norm for all lasting- and finishing-machine workers.

Judge was long a supporter of the Liberal Party. In 1887, he was put on trial, charged with intimidation, and the experience led him to move away from the Liberals, and describe himself as a political independent.

By 1888, many members of the NUBSRF were concerned that the union was dominated by its Leicester branch, where both its general secretary and president were based. He successfully proposed a restructure which created five regional division, each of which would elect one member of the executive.

Judge was a leading member of Leeds Trades Council, serving for a while as vice-president, and represented it at the 1885 Industrial Remuneration Conference. He encouraged the unionisation of tailors' machinists, weavers, and women tailors. From 1889, he promoted the idea of trades councils members standing as political candidates, but he initially received little interest. At the 1891 local elections, he put himself forward in North ward, but he withdrew after the Liberal Party candidate supported the trades council's programme. He became increasingly concerned about John Lincoln Mahon's determination to stand as an independent labour candidate, and led moved to exclude him from the trades council, describing him as a "professional agitator", and later trying to encourage members of his Mahon's union to vote him out of office, but was unsuccessful.

In the early 1890s, the NUBSRF found itself in financial difficulties, and had a high turnover of officials. At the 1892 conference, Judge's proposal that members who were locked-out would receive no union payments for the first two weeks was adopted. At the conference, he was elected to the presidency, but he resigned in May 1893, to take a full-time position at a machine-making company.

Judge later moved to Northampton, where he became an alderman on the town council. In his spare time, he was active in the National Secular Society. He died in Wigston, Leicestershire on 7 October 1916, at the age of 66.

Trade union offices
Preceded by Jabez Leedham	President of the National Union of Boot and Shoe Rivetters and Finishers; 1892–1893	Succeeded by W. Boyd Hornidge
Preceded by T. J. Elvidge and Benjamin Pickard	Auditor of the Trades Union Congress; 1887; With: Thomas Sharples	Succeeded by John Fielding and Benjamin Pickard
