= Normanton (constituency) =

Parliamentary constituency in the United Kingdom, 1885-2010

Coordinates: 53.700°N 1.415°W

- Former county constituency for the House of Commons
- Boundary of Normanton in West Yorkshire for the 2005 general election

- Location of West Yorkshire within England
- County: West Yorkshire

1885–2010
- Seats: One
- Created from: Southern West Riding of Yorkshire
- Replaced by: Normanton, Pontefract and Castleford, Morley and Outwood and Wakefield

Normanton was a county constituency represented in the House of Commons of the Parliament of the United Kingdom. It elected one Member of Parliament (MP) by the first past the post system of election.

== Boundaries ==
1885–1918:

1918–1950: The Urban Districts of Altofts, Castleford, Featherstone, Methley, Normanton, and Whitwood.

1950–1983: The Urban Districts of Normanton, Rothwell, and Stanley, in the Rural District of Tadcaster the parishes of Great and Little Preston, and Swillington, and in the Rural District of Wakefield the parishes of Crofton, Sharlston, and Warmfield-cum-Heath.

1983–1997: The City of Wakefield wards of Normanton and Sharlston, Ossett, Stanley and Altofts, and Stanley and Wrenthorpe, and the City of Leeds ward of Rothwell.

1997–2010: The City of Wakefield wards of Horbury, Normanton and Sharlston, Ossett, Stanley and Altofts, and Stanley and Wrenthorpe.

The West Yorkshire constituency included the towns of Normanton and Ossett and several villages. The area had a tradition of being working-class, but it had now become almost entirely gentrified as nearby Leeds has expanded as a financial centre.

Ossett was now actually the largest town in the area, due to its high growth in recent years.

The constituency was nicknamed the banana constituency on account of its unusual shape.

The village of Altofts, located just to the north of Normanton, was included in the constituency, despite being part of a Castleford ward, and due to move into a proposed "Pontefract and Castleford" seat which happened in 2010.

=== Boundary review ===
Following their review of parliamentary representation in West Yorkshire, the Boundary Commission for England had created a Normanton and Pontefract constituency. In late May 2006, the Commission published a revised recommendation changing the name of this constituency to Normanton, Pontefract and Castleford.

Local newspapers and the Labour Party opposed the initial change, but following a public consultation the Commission decided to create the seat conceding only a name change – from Pontefract and Castleford, to Normanton and Pontefract. This was extended to cover all three names. The wards of Wrenthorpe and Outwood West and Stanley and Outwood East – the most affluent parts of the constituency – were joined to the Conservative-leaning commuter town of Morley, which is in the Leeds district, as Morley and Outwood. Ossett and Horbury were moved to the Wakefield constituency. At the time local groups and newspapers protested that this represented a takeover of the Wakefield district by the Leeds district. An early concern of the Labour Party was that Morley and Outwood would be won by the Conservatives in 2010. Ed Balls held the seat for Labour by just 1,101 votes, and ultimately lost the seat at the 2015 general election to the Conservatives' Andrea Jenkyns.

== Members of Parliament ==
The constituency elected only Labour MPs since 1905, the longest run (with Gower and Makerfield) of any UK constituency. From 1885 to 1906, it had returned Liberal-Labour MPs.

Ed Balls, the former Secretary of State for Children, Schools and Families, represented the seat from the 2005 general election until 2010 when it was abolished.

Election	Member	Party
1885	Benjamin Pickard	Lib-Lab
1904 by-election	William Parrott	Lib-Lab
1905 by-election	Frederick Hall	Lib-Lab
1909	Frederick Hall	Labour
1933 by-election	Tom Smith	Labour
1947 by-election	George Sylvester	Labour
1950	Thomas Brooks	Labour
1951	Albert Roberts	Labour
1983	Bill O'Brien	Labour
2005	Ed Balls	Labour Co-op
2010	constituency abolished : see Normanton, Pontefract and Castleford and Morley and Outwood	

== Election results ==
=== Elections in the 1880s ===
Pickard

General election 1885: Normanton
Party	Candidate	Votes	%	±%
Lib-Lab	Benjamin Pickard	5,615	60.2	
Conservative	Albany Charlesworth	3,706	39.8	
Majority		1,909	20.4	
Turnout		9,321	81.2	
Registered electors		11,479		
Lib-Lab win (new seat)				

General election 1886: Normanton
Party	Candidate	Votes	%	±%
Lib-Lab	Benjamin Pickard	4,771	56.2	−4.0
Conservative	Albany Charlesworth	3,724	43.8	+4.0
Majority		1,047	12.4	−8.0
Turnout		8,495	74.0	−7.2
Registered electors		11,479		
Lib-Lab hold		Swing	-4.0	

=== Elections in the 1890s ===
General election 1892: Normanton
Party	Candidate	Votes	%	±%
Lib-Lab	Benjamin Pickard	6,134	61.7	+5.5
Conservative	Percy Tew	3,803	38.3	−5.5
Majority		2,331	23.4	+11.0
Turnout		9,937	76.4	+2.4
Registered electors		13,000		
Lib-Lab hold		Swing	+5.5	

General election 1895: Normanton
Party	Candidate	Votes	%	±%
Lib-Lab	Benjamin Pickard	5,499	58.3	−3.4
Conservative	D'Arcy Bruce Wilson	3,941	41.7	+3.4
Majority		1,558	16.6	−6.8
Turnout		9,440	72.6	−3.8
Registered electors		12,998		
Lib-Lab hold		Swing	-3.4	

=== Elections in the 1900s ===
General election 1900: Normanton
Party	Candidate	Votes	%	±%
Lib-Lab	Benjamin Pickard	5,025	58.2	−0.1
Conservative	Cecil Edmund Lister-Kaye, 4th Baronet	3,606	41.8	+0.1
Majority		1,419	16.4	−0.2
Turnout		8,631	65.9	−6.7
Registered electors		13,100		
Lib-Lab hold		Swing	-0.1	

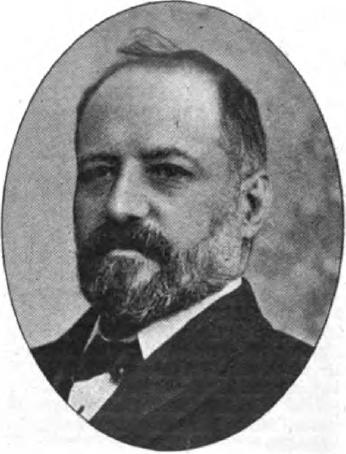
Parrott

1904 Normanton by-election
Party	Candidate	Votes	%	±%
Lib-Lab	William Parrott	6,855	70.2	+12.0
Conservative	Marcus Robert Phipps Dorman	2,909	29.8	−12.0
Majority		3,946	40.4	+24.0
Turnout		9,764	65.5	−0.4
Registered electors		14,898		
Lib-Lab hold		Swing	+12.0	

Hall

1905 Normanton by-election
Party	Candidate	Votes	%	±%
Lib-Lab	Frederick Hall	Unopposed		
Lib-Lab hold				

General election 1906: Normanton
Party	Candidate	Votes	%	±%
Lib-Lab	Frederick Hall	Unopposed		
Lib-Lab hold				

=== Elections in the 1910s ===
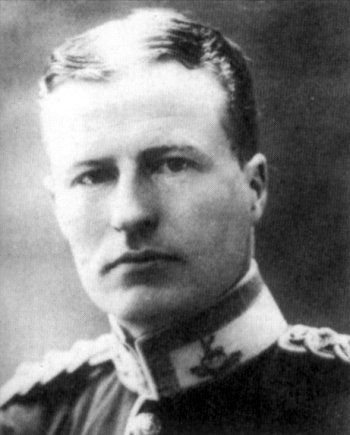
Ashmead-Bartlett

General election January 1910: Normanton
Party	Candidate	Votes	%	±%
Labour	Frederick Hall	9,172	72.2	N/A
Conservative	Ellis Ashmead-Bartlett	3,540	27.8	New
Majority		5,632	44.4	N/A
Turnout		12,712	77.2	N/A
Labour hold		Swing	N/A	

General election December 1910: Normanton
Party	Candidate	Votes	%	±%
Labour	Frederick Hall	Unopposed		
Labour hold				

General Election 1914–15:

Another General Election was required to take place before the end of 1915. The political parties had been making preparations for an election to take place and by July 1914, the following candidates had been selected;

- Lib-Lab: Frederick Hall
- Unionist:

General election 1918: Normanton
Party	Candidate	Votes	%	±%
Labour	Frederick Hall	Unopposed		
Labour hold				

=== Elections in the 1920s ===
General election 1922: Normanton
Party	Candidate	Votes	%	±%
Labour	Frederick Hall	16,040	73.3	N/A
National Liberal	Ernest George Bearcroft	5,855	26.7	New
Majority		10,185	46.6	N/A
Turnout		21,895	68.3	N/A
Labour hold		Swing	N/A	

General election 1923: Normanton
Party	Candidate	Votes	%	±%
Labour	Frederick Hall	15,455	78.0	+4.7
Unionist	George Hillman	4,365	22.0	−4.7
Majority		11,090	56.0	+9.4
Turnout		19,820	61.5	−6.8
Labour hold		Swing	+4.7	

General election 1924: Normanton
Party	Candidate	Votes	%	±%
Labour	Frederick Hall	Unopposed	N/A	N/A
Labour hold				

General election 1929: Normanton
Party	Candidate	Votes	%	±%
Labour	Frederick Hall	26,008	83.1	N/A
Unionist	Alfred Coates	5,276	16.9	New
Majority		20,732	66.2	N/A
Turnout		31,284	75.8	N/A
Labour hold		Swing	N/A	

=== Elections in the 1930s ===
General election 1931: Normanton
Party	Candidate	Votes	%	±%
Labour	Frederick Hall	22,877	69.6	−13.5
Conservative	John Norman Cumberbirch	9,974	30.4	+13.5
Majority		12,903	39.2	−27.0
Turnout		32,851	78.8	+3.0
Labour hold		Swing	-13.5	

1933 Normanton by-election
Party	Candidate	Votes	%	±%
Labour	Tom Smith	Unopposed	N/A	N/A
Labour hold				

General election 1935: Normanton
Party	Candidate	Votes	%	±%
Labour	Tom Smith	26,705	81.4	+11.8
Conservative	Eric Oscar Moss	6,106	18.6	−11.8
Majority		20,599	62.8	+23.6
Turnout		32,811	77.7	−1.1
Labour hold		Swing		

General Election 1939–40

Another General Election was required to take place before the end of 1940. The political parties had been making preparations for an election to take place and by the Autumn of 1939, the following candidates had been selected;

- Labour: Tom Smith
- Conservative: T.T. Heywood

=== Elections in the 1940s ===
General election 1945: Normanton
Party	Candidate	Votes	%	±%
Labour	Tom Smith	28,238	84.3	+2.9
Conservative	John Harvey Hulbert	5,259	15.7	−2.9
Majority		22,979	68.6	+5.8
Turnout		33,497	79.9	+2.2
Labour hold		Swing	+2.9	

1947 Normanton by-election
Party	Candidate	Votes	%	±%
Labour	George Sylvester	19,085	79.8	−4.5
Conservative	Enoch Powell	4,258	17.8	+2.1
Independent	Walter Dixon Hartley	579	2.4	New
Majority		14,827	62.0	−6.6
Turnout		23,922	54.6	−25.3
Labour hold		Swing	-3.3	

=== Elections in the 1950s ===
General election 1950: Normanton
Party	Candidate	Votes	%	±%
Labour	Thomas Brooks	31,986	74.53	
Conservative	Thomas Heseltine	10,929	25.47	
Majority		21,057	49.06	
Turnout		42,915	87.54	
Labour hold		Swing		

General election 1951: Normanton
Party	Candidate	Votes	%	±%
Labour	Albert Roberts	31,052	73.49	
National Liberal	Thomas Heseltine	11,199	26.51	
Majority		19,853	46.98	
Turnout		42,251	85.48	
Labour hold		Swing		

General election 1955: Normanton
Party	Candidate	Votes	%	±%
Labour	Albert Roberts	27,846	73.50	
Conservative	John Bird	10,040	26.50	
Majority		17,806	47.00	
Turnout		37,886	78.09	
Labour hold		Swing		

General election 1959: Normanton
Party	Candidate	Votes	%	±%
Labour	Albert Roberts	29,672	72.65	
Conservative	James A C Briggs	11,169	27.35	
Majority		18,503	45.30	
Turnout		40,841	83.11	
Labour hold		Swing		

=== Elections in the 1960s ===
General election 1964: Normanton
Party	Candidate	Votes	%	±%
Labour	Albert Roberts	28,477	72.53	
Conservative	Francis Kevin Roberts	10,785	27.47	
Majority		17,692	45.06	
Turnout		39,262	77.51	
Labour hold		Swing		

General election 1966: Normanton
Party	Candidate	Votes	%	±%
Labour	Albert Roberts	29,416	76.41	
Conservative	John Edward Robert Wauchop	9,084	23.59	
Majority		20,332	52.82	
Turnout		38,500	74.31	
Labour hold		Swing		

=== Elections in the 1970s ===
General election 1970: Normanton
Party	Candidate	Votes	%	±%
Labour	Albert Roberts	28,421	68.40	
Conservative	David H Cargill	13,132	31.60	
Majority		15,289	36.80	
Turnout		41,553	71.55	
Labour hold		Swing		

General election February 1974: Normanton
Party	Candidate	Votes	%	±%
Labour	Albert Roberts	29,621	67.22	
Conservative	Antony Marlow	14,447	32.78	
Majority		15,174	34.44	
Turnout		44,068	75.40	
Labour hold		Swing		

General election October 1974: Normanton
Party	Candidate	Votes	%	±%
Labour	Albert Roberts	24,372	58.73	
Conservative	J Makin	9,739	23.47	
Liberal	Wilfred Whitaker	7,384	17.79	New
Majority		14,633	35.26	
Turnout		41,495	70.41	
Labour hold		Swing		

General election 1979: Normanton
Party	Candidate	Votes	%	±%
Labour	Albert Roberts	26,591	56.43	
Conservative	MH Cavendish	14,398	30.55	
Liberal	ARC Paton	6,134	13.02	
Majority		12,193	25.88	
Turnout		47,123	76.76	
Labour hold		Swing		

=== Elections in the 1980s ===
General election 1983: Normanton
Party	Candidate	Votes	%	±%
Labour	Bill O'Brien	18,782	43.56	
Conservative	Alan Paul	14,599	33.86	
SDP	P Pantelli	9,741	22.59	
Majority		4,183	9.70	
Turnout		43,122	70.40	
Labour hold		Swing		

General election 1987: Normanton
Party	Candidate	Votes	%	±%
Labour	Bill O'Brien	23,303	49.54	
Conservative	Michael Smith	16,016	34.05	
SDP	Richard Macey	7,717	16.41	
Majority		7,287	15.49	
Turnout		47,036	74.78	
Labour hold		Swing		

=== Elections in the 1990s ===
General election 1992: Normanton
Party	Candidate	Votes	%	±%
Labour	Bill O'Brien	25,936	51.8	+2.3
Conservative	Robert Sturdy	16,986	33.9	−0.1
Liberal Democrats	M Galdas	7,137	14.3	−2.1
Majority		8,950	17.9	+2.4
Turnout		50,059	76.3	+1.5
Labour hold		Swing	+1.2	

General election 1997: Normanton
Party	Candidate	Votes	%	±%
Labour	Bill O'Brien	26,046	60.57	
Conservative	Fiona Bulmer	10,153	23.61	
Liberal Democrats	David Ridgway	5,347	12.43	
Referendum	Ken Shuttleworth	1,458	3.39	New
Majority		15,893	36.96	
Turnout		43,004	68.28	
Labour hold		Swing		

=== Elections in the 2000s ===
General election 2001: Normanton
Party	Candidate	Votes	%	±%
Labour	Bill O'Brien	19,152	56.1	−4.5
Conservative	Graham Smith	9,215	27.0	+3.4
Liberal Democrats	Stephen Pearson	4,990	14.6	+2.2
Socialist Labour	Mick Appleyard	798	2.3	New
Majority		9,937	29.1	−7.9
Turnout		34,155	52.2	−16.1
Labour hold		Swing		

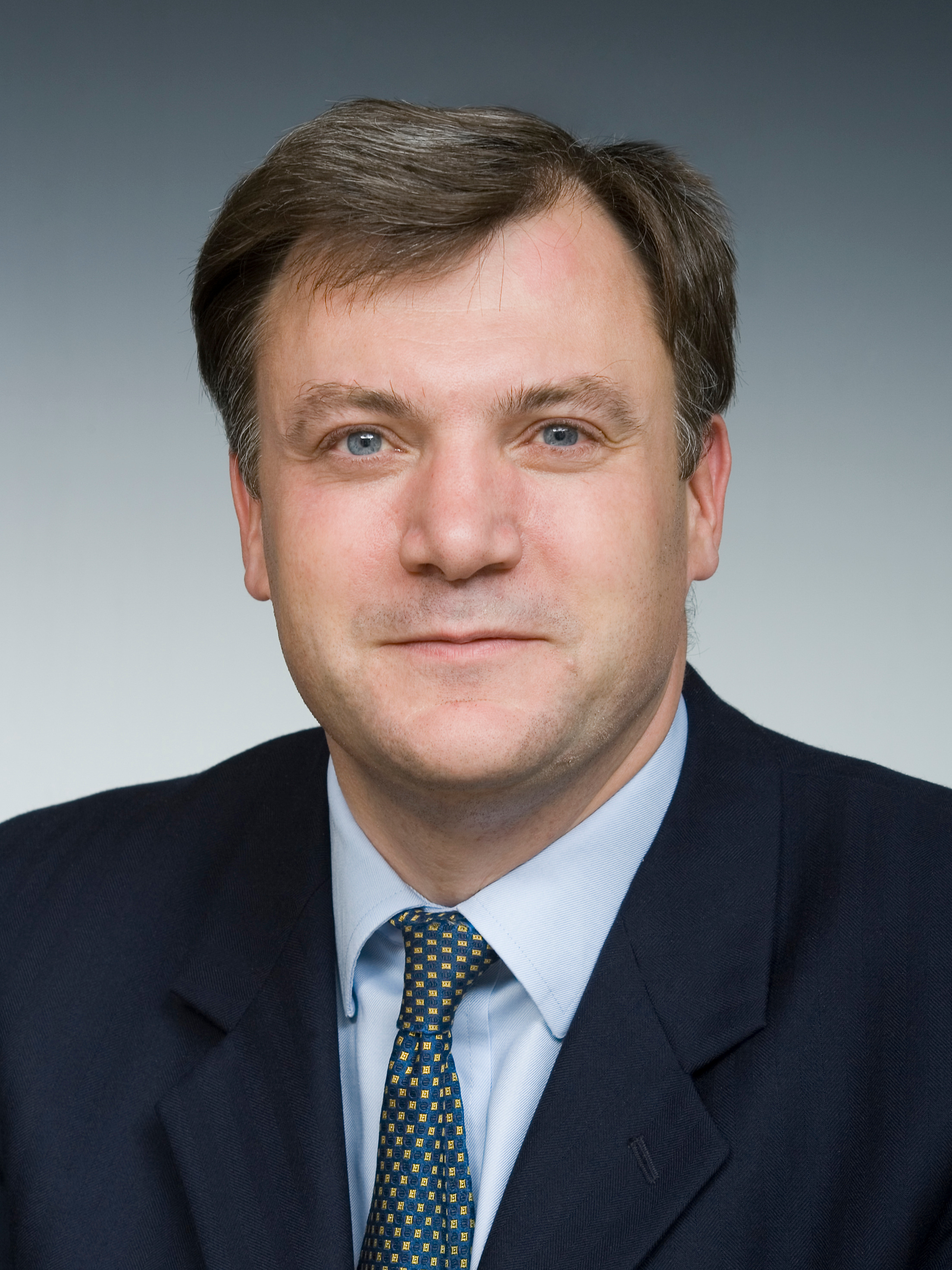
Balls

General election 2005: Normanton
Party	Candidate	Votes	%	±%
Labour Co-op	Ed Balls	19,161	51.2	−4.9
Conservative	Andrew Percy	9,159	24.5	−2.5
Liberal Democrats	Simone Butterworth	6,357	17.0	+2.4
BNP	John Aveyard	1,967	5.3	New
Independent	Mark Harrop	780	2.1	New
Majority		10,002	26.7	−2.4
Turnout		37,424	57.5	+5.3
Labour Co-op hold		Swing		

== See also ==
- Altofts
- Horbury
- Normanton
- Ossett
- Outwood
- Sharlston
- South Ossett
- Stanley
- Wrenthorpe

== Sources ==
- The Independent Labour Party and the Yorkshire Miners: The Barnsley By-Election of 1897: details on the Liberal-Labour movement in the area in the late 19th century
