= Armthorpe =

Village in South Yorkshire, England

Coordinates: 53.535176°N 1.052235°W

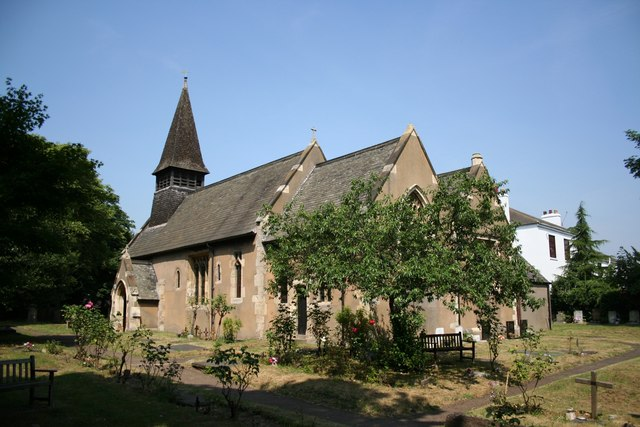
- St Leonard & St Mary’s Church

- Location within South Yorkshire
- Population: 14,457 (2011 Census)
- OS grid reference: SE631047
  - London: 145 mi (233 km) SSE
- Civil parish: Armthorpe
- Metropolitan borough: Doncaster
- Metropolitan county: South Yorkshire
- Region: Yorkshire and the Humber
- Country: England
- Sovereign state: United Kingdom
- Post town: DONCASTER
- Postcode district: DN3
- Dialling code: 01302
- Police: South Yorkshire
- Fire: South Yorkshire
- Ambulance: Yorkshire
- UK Parliament: Doncaster Central

Armthorpe is a large suburban village and civil parish in the City of Doncaster, South Yorkshire, England. Historically within the West Riding of Yorkshire, it had a population of 12,630, increasing to 14,457 at the 2011 Census.

== History ==
=== Etymology ===
The settlement of Armthorpe was first recorded in 1086 as 'Ernulfestorp', showing the influence of the Vikings on the region. Its probable origination means outlying farmstead or hamlet (from the Old Scandinavian - thorp) of a man named Earnwulf or Arnulfr.

=== Early history ===
The remains of a Roman village and farm were found on Nutwell Lane and through the centuries Armthorpe was known for its rich farming activities. To some extent the rich crop farming heritage continues today and the area between Armthorpe and the M18 motorway is still dedicated to farming.

Armthorpe (Ernulfestorp) was recorded in the Domesday Book as being the property of the monks of Roche Abbey near Maltby, who had a grange there at which an official resided who managed this part of the estates of the establishment and who was sometimes a brother of the house: they had also an officer called their forester. The parish comprised 3,810 acres (15.4 km^{2}) and included the farm of Holm-Wood. The village at this time consisted mainly of scattered houses.

=== Coal mining ===
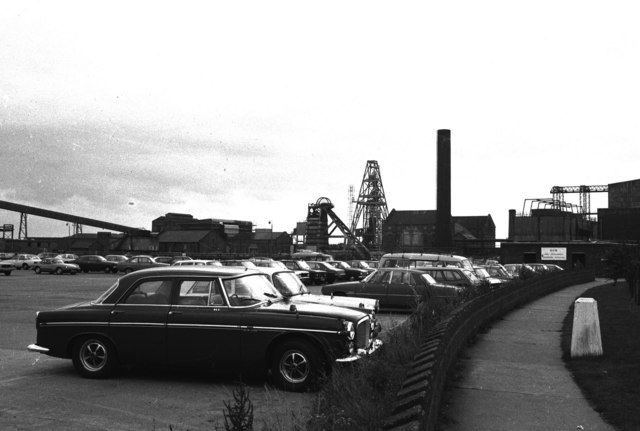
Markham Main Colliery

During the late 19th and for most of the 20th century Armthorpe became known for its Coal mining and a deep seam Colliery was sunk; the pit was named Markham Main. The mining increased the local population dramatically and whole new housing estates were constructed to house the mining workers. These housing estates were famous for their architectural layout. From the air you can see that the houses are formed into rings or crescents, similar examples can be seen in Rossington.

After the closure of the mine 1996 the area went through deep depression. The old colliery site is now a large housing estate, with a thriving community with parks and tracks for walking and cycling to the local wood.

== Present day ==
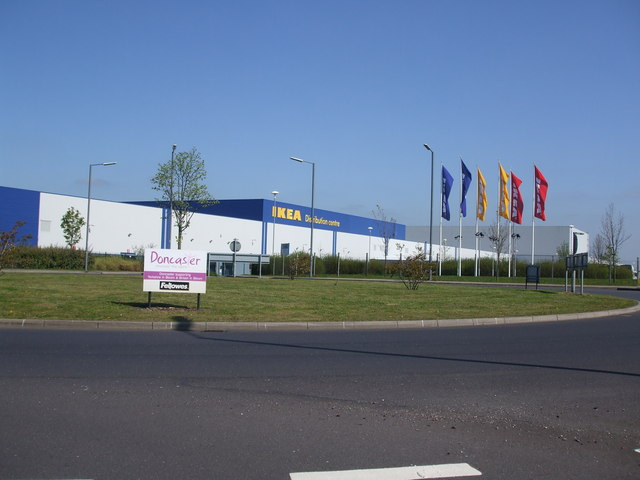
IKEA warehouse

Today, on average, Armthorpe remains one of the more affluent areas of Doncaster.

== Places of worship ==
Armthorpe has three churches (the Methodist Church in Paxton Crescent closed in 2007):

- St. Leonard and St. Mary's Church, Church Street, where parish registers record information from the following dates:
  - Baptisms: 1653–1944
  - Marriages: 1653–1939
  - Burials: 1654–1946
- Our Lady Of Sorrows Roman Catholic Church, Mere Lane
- Armthorpe New Life Church, Church Street (meets in the Community Centre)

== Sport ==
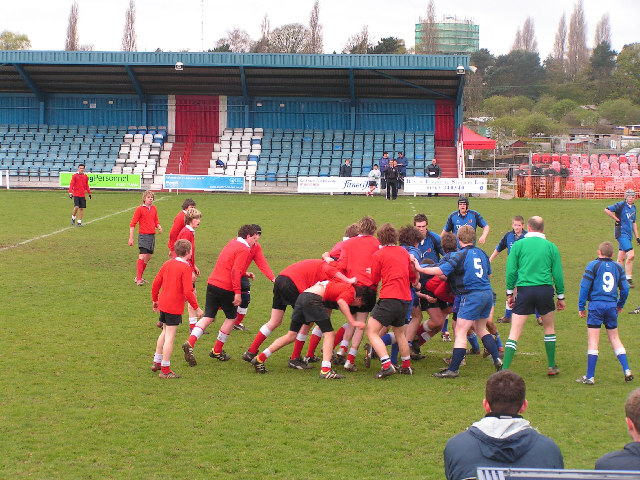
Doncaster Rugby Union Club

- Boxing - Universal Pro/Amateur Boxing Club is on Church Street
- Football
  - Armthorpe Welfare Football Club are currently members of the Northern Counties East Football League Premier Division
  - Armthorpe Village Football Club are currently members of the Doncaster & District Sunday Alliance league
  - Armthorpe Welfare Junior Football Club, playing at Shaw Wood Academy, have teams in the Doncaster and District Junior Sunday League. There is a walking football section based at the Armthorpe Academy, and a Development Group for 3 to 6 year olds which takes place in the summer months. AWJFC is a FA Charter Standard Club
  - Armthorpe Rovers Junior Football Club have teams in age groups from Under 6's up to Under 17's
- Motocross - Armthorpe Motocross and Quadbike Racing
- Rugby - Doncaster Knights play at the Castle Park ground on Armthorpe Road, and currently part of the RFU Championship
- Swimming - Armthorpe Kingfishers Swimming Club is based at the village Leisure Centre next to Armthorpe Academy
- Dancing - Marilyn Baker School of Dance, Stephanie Phillips School of Dance, Creative Dance Academy
- Golf - Wheatley Golf Course, part of a private club, is on the outskirts of Armthorpe

== Notable people ==
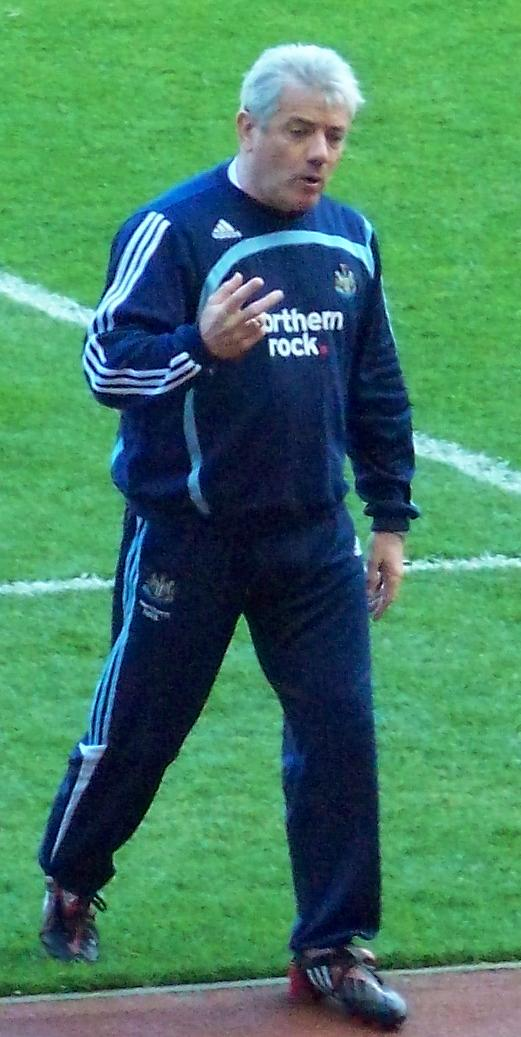
Kevin Keegan

- Kevin Keegan, footballer and manager, born in Armthorpe
- Peter Swan, footballer, centre half for Sheffield Wednesday and England in the 1960s
- Haydn Griffiths MBE, conductor Armthorpe Elmfield brass band, and first Honorary Freeman of Armthorpe in December 2010
- Gary Cooper, professional wrestler, better known as his comedy character Catweazle who trained at the Armthorpe Wrestling Club
- Mick McMichael, professional wrestler, often confused with the much more famous Mick McManus
- Mick Bates (English footballer) Leeds United

== Education ==
Pre-School

- Armthorpe Village Children's Centre provides advice and support for parents and carers.

Primary schools

- Tranmoor
- Southfield
- Shaw Wood
- Our Lady of Sorrows

Secondary schools

- The Armthorpe Academy
