= Hugh Fenwick Brooke =

British general (1871–1948)

Brigadier-General Hugh Fenwick Brooke CB CMG CBE
- Born: 9 June 1871; Parsonstown, Ireland
- Died: 13 April 1948 (aged 76); Seaview, Isle of Wight
- Military career
- Allegiance: United Kingdom
- Branch: British Army
- Service years: 1892–1924
- Rank: Brigadier-General
- Unit: Royal Inniskilling Fusiliers
- Conflicts: Second Boer War, First World War
- Awards: CB, CMG, CBE

Brigadier-General Hugh Fenwick Brooke, CB, CMG, CBE (9 June 1871 – 13 April 1948) was a senior British Army officer during the First World War.

== Biography ==
Born on 9 June 1871 to Charles Kennedy Brooke and Isabella Julia (née Merston), Hugh Fenwick Brooke was educated at Bedford School between 1885 and 1890. He received his first commission as a second lieutenant in the Royal Inniskilling Fusiliers in 1892, and was promoted to the rank of captain in July 1899. He transferred to the Army Service Corps for service during the Second Boer War, and left London for South Africa on the SS Oriental in March 1900. Return to the United Kingdom in 1901. Promotion to the rank of major followed in 1906, and to the rank of lieutenant colonel in 1914. He served during the First World War, between 1914 and 1918, was promoted to the rank of colonel in 1915, was appointed as Deputy Director of Supplies and Transport at the War Office, and as Deputy Director of Supplies at General Headquarters, France. He was promoted to the rank of brigadier general in 1920, and retired from the British Army in 1924.

Brigadier General Hugh Fenwick Brooke was invested as a Companion of the Order of St Michael and St George in 1915, as a Companion of the Order of the Bath in 1917, and as a Commander of the Order of the British Empire in 1919. He died in Seaview, Isle of Wight, on 13 April 1948.
