= Steve Kemp (trade unionist) =

British trade unionist

Steve Kemp (born 1961) is a British trade unionist.

Kemp grew up in South Hiendley in West Yorkshire, and worked briefly as a butcher before becoming a coal miner at South Kirkby Colliery. He became active in the National Union of Mineworkers (NUM), and participated in the miners' strike of 1984 to 1985.

In 1988, the South Kirkby mine closed, and Kemp moved to work at the Stillingfleet Mine, near Selby. A supporter of Arthur Scargill, he became treasurer, and then secretary of his union branch. He stood for the Labour Party National Executive Committee (NEC) in 1996 and for several years afterwards, but was never elected. He also attempted to become the Labour candidate in the 1996 Hemsworth by-election, but was barred from standing by a panel of NEC members.

Kemp was elected as Secretary of the NUM in 2002, proposing to strengthen the union's links with the Labour Party. He stood down in 2007, and joined the political department of the GMB Union.

Trade union offices
Preceded by Position vacant	General Secretary of the National Union of Mineworkers; 2002–2007	Succeeded by Chris Kitchen
