= 1933 Normanton by-election =

UK parliamentary by-election

← 1933	8 May 1933	1935 →

The Normanton seat in the House of Commons. Triggered by death of incumbent
Candidate	Tom Smith
Party	Labour
MP before election
Frederick Hall
Labour
Subsequent MP
Tom Smith
Labour

The 1933 Normanton by-election was a parliamentary by-election held for the British House of Commons constituency of Normanton on 8 May 1933. The seat had become vacant on the death of the Labour Member of Parliament Frederick Hall, who had held the seat since a previous by-election in 1905.

Following Labour's declaration of former Pontefract MP Tom Smith as their candidate, the Communist Party of Great Britain declared unemployed Castleford engineer John William Malkin as their competing candidate. However, as the Communist Party was at the time opposed to the requirement of a £150 deposit, their candidate was declared to be invalid and Labour's candidate was returned unopposed. Smith represented the constituency until he resigned his seat in 1947, triggering another by-election.

== See also ==
- Normanton (UK Parliament constituency)
- 1947 Normanton by-election
- List of United Kingdom by-elections
