= John Wadsworth =

British politician

John Wadsworth MP, circa 1906

John Wadsworth (1850 – 10 July 1921) was a British trade unionist and Liberal or Lib-Lab politician.

Born in West Melton in the West Riding of Yorkshire, Wadsworth worked as a coal miner and was elected checkweighman. He joined the Yorkshire Miners Association, a constituent part of the Miners Federation of Great Britain (MFGB), rising to become the Yorkshire Association's general secretary, then in 1904 its president.

Wadsworth was elected as the Lib-Lab Member of Parliament (MP) for Hallamshire at the 1906 general election.

General election 1906: Hallamshire
Party	Candidate	Votes	%	±%
Liberal	John Wadsworth	8,375	55.2	
Conservative	Frederic Kelley	6,807	44.8	
Majority		1,568	10.4	
Turnout			83.9	
Liberal hold		Swing		

In 1909, with the other MFGB-sponsored MPs, he joined the Labour Party, retaining his seat in his new colours.

General election January 1910: Hallamshire
Party	Candidate	Votes	%	±%
Labour	John Wadsworth	10,193	62.2	
Conservative	Thomas Sutton Timmis	6,185	37.8	
Majority		4,008	24.4	
Turnout			82.2	
Labour gain from Liberal		Swing		

General election December 1910: Hallamshire
Party	Candidate	Votes	%	±%
Labour	John Wadsworth	8,708	59.9	
Conservative	David Thurston Smith	5,837	40.1	
Majority		2,871	19.8	
Turnout			73.0	
Labour hold		Swing		

In 1915 he resigned the Labour whip and re-joined the Liberals. He continued as MP until the seat's abolition for the 1918 general election.

Trade union offices
Preceded by George Cragg	Vice-President of the Yorkshire Miners' Association; 1889–1904	Succeeded by Herbert Smith
Preceded by Edward Cowey	President of the Yorkshire Miners' Association; 1904–1906	Succeeded by Herbert Smith
Preceded by William Parrott	General Secretary of the Yorkshire Miners' Association; 1906–1921	Succeeded by Samuel Roebuck
Preceded by William Parrott and William Henry Wilkinson	Auditor of the Trades Union Congress; 1903–1905; With: William Henry Wilkinson (1903–1904); Joe Williams (1905)	Succeeded by Alfred Smalley and David Watts Morgan
Preceded by John Hodge and David Shackleton	Trades Union Congress representative to the American Federation of Labour; 1908; With: Herbert Skinner	Succeeded by J. R. Clynes and Alfred Henry Gill
Parliament of the United Kingdom
Preceded by Frederick Mappin	Member of Parliament for Hallamshire; 1906–1918	Constituency abolished
