= Markham Main Colliery =

Former colliery in South Yorkshire, England

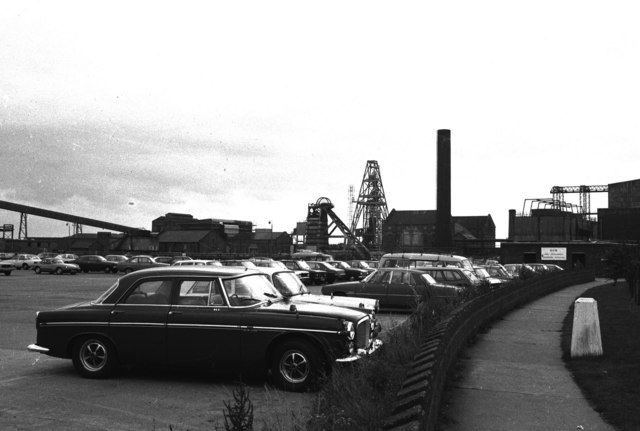
- Markham Main Colliery in August 1980

- Location in South Yorkshire
- Location: Armthorpe, DN3 2BP, Doncaster, South Yorkshire, England; 53°32′15″N 1°04′22″W
- Products: Coal
- Opened: 1916
- Closed: 1996

Markham Main Colliery was a coal mine in Armthorpe, on the eastern edge of Doncaster, South Yorkshire, England. It could be seen, and was a landmark, from the nearby M18.

== History ==
Plans for the pit started in June 1913 when Earl Fitzwilliam leased the minerals under his estate in Armthorpe to Sir Arthur Markham. The pit was sunk on 6 May 1916, but following the death of Markham on 5 August 1916, the pit was named Markham Main in his honour. However work stopped shortly afterwards on 24 August 1916 on account of wartime restrictions on capital and shortages of both labour and other resources. Work continued on 21 May 1922. Coal was first recovered on 5 May 1924. The site cost around £1 million and a model village for the pit (Armthorpe) was built. The pit was served by an LMS-LNER joint railway, first built by the South Yorkshire Joint Railway.

For many years it was used as a training pit for the local area, with a training tunnel. In the 1950s it had around 2,700 workers. A domestic fuel processing plant was built in 1966. In the mid-1980s the pit had around 1,500 employees. When the 1980s miners' strike finished in 1985, Markham Main was the last Yorkshire pit to return to work, three days later.

On its initial closure in 1992, it had around 700 workers. The colliery fully closed in 1996 when it had an estimated 50,000,000 tonnes (55,000,000 tons) of coal reserves, enough for around fifty years. The site is now a housing estate, next to Sandall Beat Wood. Between 1920 and 1996, 87 miners died at the pit.

== Ownership ==
It was first run as Markham Main Colliery Ltd. This was taken over by Doncaster Amalgamated Collieries Ltd in February 1937, based at The Lodge on South Parade in Doncaster. This company also owned Yorkshire Main Colliery at Edlington. The chairman of this company was William Humble, whose son was Bill Humble the aviator and granddaughter is Kate Humble. William Humble was a mining engineer who had overseen the construction of the pit.

=== National Coal Board ===
The British coal industry was nationalised in July 1946.

=== British Coal ===
The British coal industry was privatised in 1995 and ownership came under Coal Investments. In April 1992 there was a union dispute over the use of private contractors to develop new coalfaces at the pit. This development work would have been in the miners' long-term interests, but the unions claimed it was privatisation by the back-door. British Coal argued that outside contractors would carry out the work much quicker.

Michael Heseltine announced closure the pit in October 1992, as it was thought not to be economically viable; production stopped soon afterwards. After the announcement, local women set up a camp at the site to protest about its closure; this was the first of its kind. Another camp was set up at Houghton Main Colliery as part of the Women Against Pit Closures Campaign. Later in 1992 Michael Heseltine was considering saving the pit, along with one at Betws in Wales. The protests were often accompanied by the colliery band.

=== Coal Investments ===
It was bought by Malcolm Edwards' (former Commercial Director of British Coal) Coal Investments, which owned six pits, in May 1994. Coal Investments went into administration in February 1996. A buyer was sought for the pit but none was found and on 28 June 1996 ownership was handed over to the Coal Authority by the liquidators. If no buyer was found, the only option for the Coal Authority was to sell off the mine's equipment at auction. Three of Coal Investments' pits had found buyers – Cwmgwili near Swansea, Silverdale, Staffordshire, and Annesley Bentinck Colliery. A buyer had earlier been found for these last two together with Markham Main which was financially backed by PhilDrew Ventures, but had lost out to management buy-outs which only bought the other two, and not all three. Most of the UK's pits at the time were owned by RJB Mining.

Markham Main was a less attractive prospect than other mines because it needed investment of around £8 million to improve a face gap in the coal seam. Had that investment been found, it would have had firm contracts from National Power and Eastern Group. By September 1996 the Coal Authority could not find a buyer and decided to close the pit.

== Production ==
There were two shafts, both 17 feet (5.18 m) in diameter. No.1 was 2,838 feet (865 m) deep and No.2 was 2,241 feet (683 m) deep. In the 1950s it produced 14,000 tonnes (15,000 tons) of coal a week.

In the mid-1980s it was producing around 18,000 tonnes (20,000 tons) of coal a week, with most going to local power stations along the Aire and Trent. Before the miners' strike of 1984 it was producing 24,000 tonnes (26,000 tons) a week. It had three coal faces, with two coal cutting machines per face. Production was restarted in autumn 1994 after the pit had closed in 1992.

== Brass band ==
The brass band, also based in Armthorpe, is still in operation – the last vestige of the pit. However, the brass band is more widely well-known than the pit. It was formed in 1924. It was named Markham Main Colliery Band in 1945.

== See also ==
- Markham Colliery at Staveley near Chesterfield
