= Markham Colliery disaster =

England mining disaster

Coordinates: 53°14′38″N 1°19′48″W

Mining accidents at the Markham Colliery at Staveley near Chesterfield, Derbyshire, England.

== 1973 accident ==
On 30 July 1973, 18 coal miners were killed and a further 11 were seriously injured when a descending cage carrying the men failed to slow down as it approached the bottom of the mine shaft, with the 18 miners killed by the impact. The accident was caused by fracture of the brake rod, when a slowly growing fatigue crack reached a critical size, and the brake rod parted.

Following a thorough investigation, it was found that metal fatigue failure occurred in the braking mechanism used to slow down the cage as it descended.

== Accident investigation ==
=== Background ===
The main part of the set-up is the winding motor which is driven by the DC motor. Two double deck cages are attached to the two ends of the winding rope. At the start of the winding cycle, power applied to winding motor is gradually increased and mechanical brake released. The cages accelerate, then maintain a speed of 6 metres per second (20 ft/s) until the cages approach the ends of the shaft. During deceleration, generator voltage driving the winding motor is reduced to produce regenerative braking and it is finally brought to rest by a mechanical brake.

Mechanical brake consists of a pair of brake shoes applied to the underside of the brake paths by the action of the compressed spring nest operating through a system of levers. Force is transmitted from the spring nest to main lever through a 2 in (51 mm) diameter steel rod 8 feet 11.875 inches (2.740 m) long. This vertical brake rod is always in tension as the springs are compressed. It also consists of a servospring mechanism which uses the compressed air to counteract the spring force to move the brake shoes away.

For the sake of safety there is an automatic controller which cuts off the power supply to winder motor and applies mechanical brake. Also, there is an emergency stop button which activates the "ungabbling gear" which disengages brake control lever from Iversen type valve and applies mechanical brake.

=== Accident ===
On Monday 30 July 1973 the winding engine man noticed some sparks under the brake cylinder when he started to retard the winding. He immediately increased regenerative braking and simultaneously pulled the brake lever to the "on" position. As there was no effect, he pressed the emergency stop button. This too had no effect and the cage crashed the bottom wooden landing baulks with enormous force.

=== Investigation ===
All electrical and mechanical components of the winding system were thoroughly investigated to find the cause of accident. Electrical systems were found to be working as supply of compressed air was available above the servo cylinder. However, the brake shoes were about 0.12 inches (3 mm) clear of the brake paths as the vertical brake rod had broken into two pieces, so the investigation concentrated on the failure of the brake rod.

A chemical analysis proved that the material of the brake rod (carbon steel with the designation En8, conforming to British Standard 970:1947) was within the specification demanded at the time of manufacture.

Metallurgical examination of the brake rod showed that it failed because of fatigue. There were many secondary cracks around the fracture surface which were detected by magnetic particle technique. To investigate fatigue failure, it was necessary to determine the in‑service loading of the brake rod.

The broken rod was replaced with a new rod and loading conditions were applied. Four strain gauges were attached at a distance of 21 inches (533 mm) from the lower end, located 90 degrees apart around the circumference of the rod. Readings were taken during manual release and application of the brake and during emergency application of brake. The results showed that in addition to the expected direct tensile stresses at gauge positions there were substantial stresses due to bending when the brake was operated. The magnitude of stresses varied to such an extent that for the one farthest from the drum there was a change from tension to compression as the brake was released. The rod was not designed for such alternating bending loads. The rod was designed with a factor of safety 6.1 for tensile stress. But when alternative bending stress are induced, failure was inevitable.

It was also found that mild steel bearing pad surfaces were badly worn as lubrication was not effective at bearings. This was also due to the unexpected bending stress which progressively squeezed the lubricant out of the gap.

=== Follow up ===
A National Committee for Safety of Manriding in Shafts and Unwalkable Outlets was formed and first met on 3 December 1973. The Committee produced two reports and an addendum.

The National Coal Board carried out a programme to examine the braking and safety systems on all of its mine winders and modified them in accordance with the recommendations of the reports.

== 1938 explosion ==
An underground explosion in 1938 had killed 79 miners and seriously injured 40 others.

== Closure of the mine ==
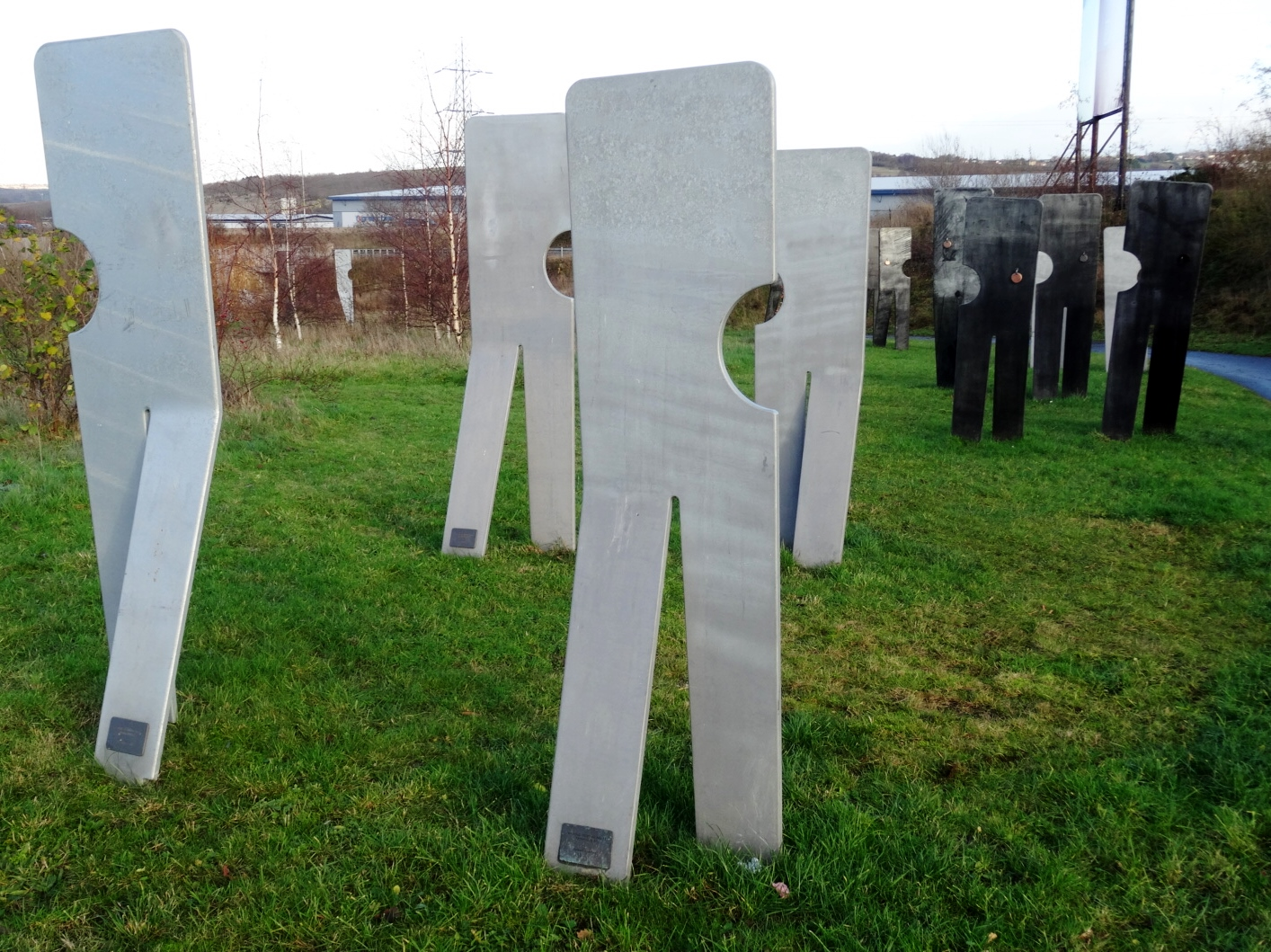
Walking Together sculpture

The mine closed in 1994. In 2013, the Walking Together sculpture by Stephen Broadbent was installed at the site of the former colliery. The walking trail of steel figures is a memorial to the 106 miners who died in mining disasters at the colliery in 1937, 1938 and 1973. Each figure represents an individual dead miner whose name is stamped on the circular bronze tag on the figure's chest. By 2020, 88 figures had been installed. Fundraising continued until October 2022 when the last figures were installed, completing the commemoration of the 106 men lost.
