= Rawmarsh Community School =

Location
- Monkwood Road; Rawmarsh, Rotherham, South Yorkshire, S62 7GA; England; 53.46594°N 1.34850°W

Information
- Type: Academy
- Motto: High expectations
- Department for Education URN: 140553 Tables
- Ofsted: Reports
- Headteacher: Mrs O'brien, Mr Conlin
- Gender: Mixed
- Age: 11 to 16
- Enrolment: 948
- Colours: Blue & Black
- Publication: Rawmarsh & Me
- Website: https://rawmarsh.org/

Rawmarsh Community School is a coeducational secondary school with academy status located in Rotherham, South Yorkshire, England.

== History ==
=== Secondary modern school ===
Rawmarsh Secondary Modern began in the 1940s. In September 1966 the headmaster of Lumley Sec Mod in Skegness, Patrick Laing, from Edinburgh, became headteacher, until the 1980s.

In October 1970 filming took place of the BBC series 'If You Were Me', broadcast in February 1971, made with RTT of Tunisia, produced by Molly Cox.

=== Comprehensive ===
It became comprehensive around 1974. New extensions opened in October 1974.

== Ofsted inspections ==
Since the commencement of Ofsted inspections in September 1993, the school has undergone many inspections.

Ofsted reports rated Rawmarsh Community School as Grade 4 (Inadequate) for overall effectiveness in 2007, Grade 3 (Satisfactory) in 2008 and 2011, and Grade 4 in 2013. The school was placed in Special measures in 2013. Based on the 2017 inspection, Ofsted now rates Rawmarsh Community School as a Grade 2 (Good) School.

Date of inspection	Outcome	Reference
17–20 September 2001	Good	Report
2–3 May 2007	Inadequate (notice to improve)	Report
13–14 May 2008	Satisfactory	Report
29 November 2010 / 28 January 2011	Satisfactory	Report
27–28 February 2013	Inadequate (special measures)	Report
15–16 May 2014	Requires improvement	Report
4–5 May 2017	Good	Report

== Headteachers ==
- 1966–1987 – Pat Laing
- 1987–1998 – Tony Evans
- 1998–2010 – John Lambert
- 2010–2013 – Mr G Wilson
- 2013–present – David Hudson OBE (Executive Headteacher)
- 2013–2020 – Mrs Helen O’Brien (Headteacher)
- 2020-2024 – Mathew Turton
- 2024–Present – Mark Conlin

== Notable pupils ==
- Peter Elliott (athlete), silver in the 1500 metres in the 1988 Summer Olympics, represented the school at cross-country running, with rivalry with Aston Comprehensive, became South Yorkshire Schools County Council champion aged 14 in 1977.

== Former teachers ==
Les Sheard, rugby league, with Wakefield Trinity

== Media ==
In September 2006 Jamie Oliver and Rawmarsh Community School were the subject of newspaper reports after a group of parents objected to Oliver's "healthy school dinners" scheme, in which pupils on site were fed 'healthy options' during school lunchtime pupil lock-ins. Some parents took orders over the school fence for nearby sandwich and fast-food outlets. The food was then delivered over the fence to waiting pupils.
