= Yorkshire Miners' Association =

Former trade union of the United Kingdom

- Merged into: National Union of Mineworkers
- Founded: 1881
- Dissolved: 1994
- Headquarters: Barnsley
- Location: United Kingdom
- Members: 79,052 (1907)
- Publication: Yorkshire Miner
- Affiliations: MFGB
- Website: www.num.org.uk/page/NUMYorkshireArea

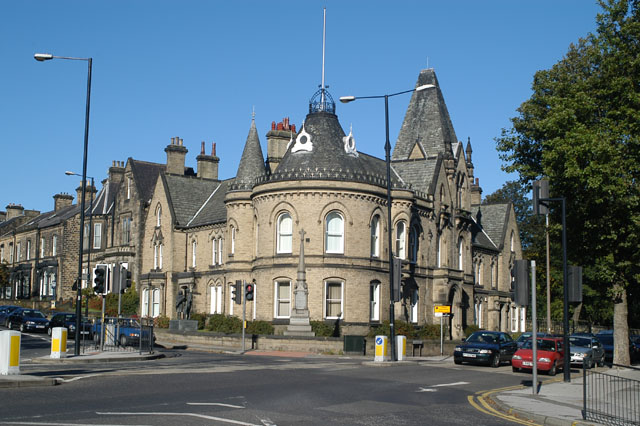
Former offices of the Yorkshire Miners' Association, in Barnsley.

The Yorkshire Miners' Association was a British trade union. It is now an integral part of the National Union of Mineworkers (NUM).

== History ==
The union was founded in 1881 with the merger of the South Yorkshire Miners' Association, and the West Yorkshire Miners' Association, agreed only because both organisations were weakened by unsuccessful disputes. In order to save money, it moved away from its predecessors' focus on paying benefits to members who were unable to work, and instead aimed to improve working conditions. This proved immediately successful, as the union obtained a 10% rise in wages in 1882, and membership grew to over 20,000.

In 1994, the union's members were transferred to the national body, the NUM.

== Officials ==
=== General secretaries ===
1881: Benjamin Pickard
1904: William Parrott
1906: John Wadsworth
1923: Samuel Roebuck
1924: Joseph Jones
1939: Ernest Jones
1954: Fred Collindridge
1964: Sid Schofield
1973: Owen Briscoe
1986: Sammy Thompson
1988: Kenneth Homer
2002: Steve Kemp
2007: Chris Kitchen

=== Presidents ===
1881: Edward Cowey
1904: John Wadsworth
1906: Herbert Smith
1938: Joe Hall
1952: Alwyn Machen
1960: Sam Bullough
1973: Arthur Scargill
1982: Jack Taylor
1990: Frank Cave?
1990s: Steve Kemp

=== Vice presidents ===
1881: George Cragg
1889: John Wadsworth
1904: Herbert Smith
1906: John Guest
1919: Edward Hough
1945: Fred Collindridge
1954: Sam Bullough
1961: Jack Leigh
1978: Jack Taylor
1982: Sammy Thompson
1986:
1990s: Ken Capstick
