= National Union of Mineworkers (Great Britain) =

British coal mining trade union

NUM
- National Union of Mineworkers

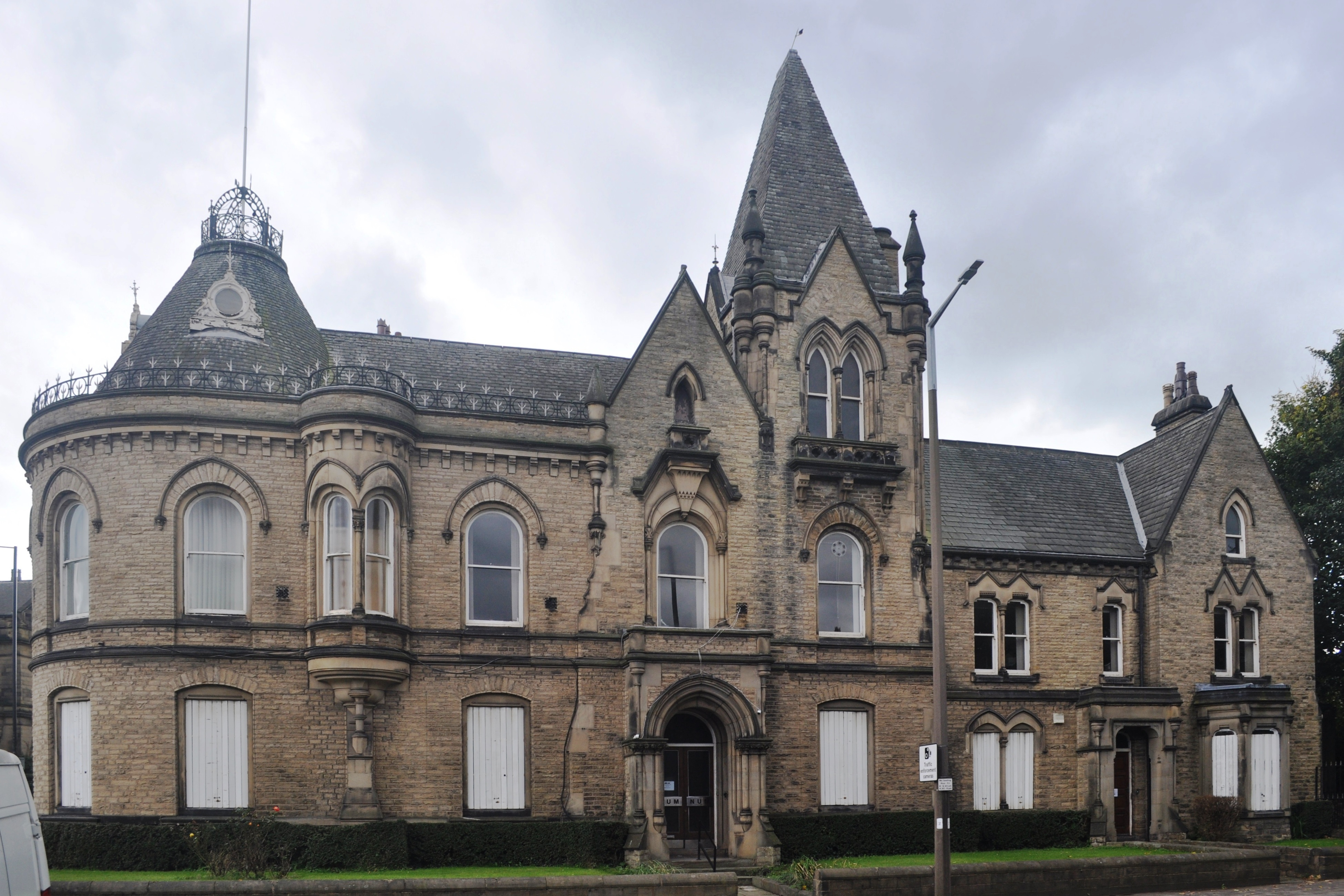
- Headquarters in South Yorkshire
- Predecessor: Miners' Federation of Great Britain
- Founded: January 1945; 81 years ago
- Headquarters: 2 Huddersfield Road, Barnsley
- Location: United Kingdom
- Members: 423,085 (1946); 750 (2016); 311 (2018); 196 (2023)
- Secretary: Christian Kitchen
- President: Nicolas Wilson
- Affiliations: TUC; STUC; NSSN; Labour Party
- Website: num.org.uk

The National Union of Mineworkers (NUM) is a trade union for coal workers in Great Britain, formed in 1945 out of the Miners' Federation of Great Britain (MFGB). The NUM took part in three national miners' strikes, in 1972, 1974 and 1984–85. Following the 1984–85 strike, and the subsequent closure of most of Britain's coal mines, it became a much smaller union. It had around 170,000 members when Arthur Scargill became leader in 1981, a figure which had fallen in 2023 to an active membership of 196.

== Origins ==
The Miners' Federation of Great Britain was established in Newport, Monmouthshire in 1888 but did not function as a unified, centralised trade union for all miners. Instead the federation represented and co-ordinated the affairs of the existing local and regional miners' unions whose associations remained largely autonomous. The South Wales Miners' Federation, founded in 1898, joined the MFGB in 1899, while the Northumberland Miners' Association and the Durham Miners' Association joined in 1907 and 1908, respectively.

== Post-1945 ==
In January 1945, the MFGB was superseded by the National Union of Mineworkers. Within the organisation, each coalfield continued to exercise a degree of autonomy, having its own district association, president, general secretary, and headquarters. Originally, a national strike required a two-thirds majority in a ballot of members, however, this proved near impossible to achieve, and the majority was reduced to 55% in 1970, and to 50% in 1984. Regions of the union could call their own strikes. Different areas varied as to how militant they were, and it was not uncommon for animosity to exist between areas.

On formation, the NUM had the following areas:

Area	Membership (1944)	Membership (1979)
Bristol	400	N/A
Cokemen	3,000	5,138
Colliery Officials	N/A	18,980
Craftsmen Group No.1	15,200	9,471
Craftsmen Group No.2	12,200	4,638
Cumberland	7,500	914
Derbyshire	25,000	11,617
Durham	106,472	16,258
Kent	5,100	2,759
Lancashire and Cheshire	40,000	8,798
Leicester	4,000	3,241
Midlands	30,000	13,973
Northumberland	28,561	7,767
North Wales	7,526	1,052
Nottingham	30,000	34,275
Power	13,561	4,982
Power Group No.2	N/A	1,230
Scotland	51,000	16,373
Somerset	2,600	N/A
South Derbyshire	5,743	3,269
South Wales	100,000	26,092
Yorkshire	115,000	64,060

The NUM was strongly supportive of the Labour Party. During the first government of Harold Wilson, hundreds of pits closed and thousands of miners left the coal industry but the NUM leadership put up little resistance to the programme. Unofficial strikes were common in the coal industry. Following an unofficial strike in 1969 about the pay of surface workers, it was decided that the threshold for the ballot should be lowered.

The NUM opposed membership of the European Economic Community, beginning with a unanimous conference vote in 1971. During the 1975 referendum, there was a debate within the NUM over the sponsorship giving to Labour MPs in coalfields, given how many of them were campaigning in favour of membership and defying the NUM policy. The Yorkshire Area passed a resolution that tightened the conditions for sponsorship of MPs.

== The Miners' Strike, 1984–85 ==
In the 1980s, because many coal mines were overwhelmingly unprofitable, the Conservative government headed by Margaret Thatcher sought to close them and privatise the rest. In some areas, the NUM was militant and threatened strikes in 1981 when the government raised the issue. As the government was not ready for a confrontation, it negotiated a settlement with the union, and backed down from the closures. In what the NUM considered a confrontational move, Ian MacGregor, who had overseen cutbacks and closures at British Steel Corporation, was appointed head of the National Coal Board (NCB) by Thatcher in 1983.

In 1984, after secretly stockpiling coal at power stations, the NCB announced the closure of 20 pits. Local regions organised strikes but NUM President Arthur Scargill, without a national ballot of the union's membership, declared a national strike in March 1984, which was ruled illegal in England and Wales, making striking miners ineligible for benefits. Support for the strike was not universal; in some areas such as North Wales support was small, but great in others such as South Wales. Also, Yorkshire was more enthusiastic about the strike than Nottinghamshire where many miners refused to strike.

Margaret Thatcher described Scargill as the "enemy within", but Scargill was equally confrontational. Picket lines were stationed outside the pits and other industrial sites requiring coal and violent clashes with police were common. Strikers had no source of income and some were forced by circumstances to cross the picket lines as reluctant "scabs". The strike ended on 3 March 1985 and the miners returned to work without agreement with the NCB. The strike was unsuccessful and its failure was an era-defining moment in British politics. Following the strike large numbers of collieries were closed.

The strike's effectiveness was reduced because the NUM leaders refused to nationally ballot members on strike action and argued that it was an issue for each area to decide. In some areas that held ballots the majority voted against striking but were subject to picketing from areas that had declared a strike. The strike was deemed illegal by the courts on the basis that the NUM rulebook required a secret ballot for a national strike. Although working miners had instigated the legal action, the NUM leadership presented it as an attack on its right to conduct its own internal affairs. The lack of a ballot reduced public support and made it easier for the government to use legal and police powers against the union without significant political consequences.

The closed shop in the state-owned coal sector was ended when a breakaway union, the Union of Democratic Mineworkers, was formed mostly by miners in Nottinghamshire and South Derbyshire who felt betrayed by the NUM for insisting on a strike after their area ballot had rejected strike action. In contrast, the Leicestershire area stayed in the NUM, as the area leader Jack Jones had kept good relations with the local miners by openly defying Scargill.

Following the end of the strike, the NUM took an active leadership role in working to align the labour movement in the UK more closely with LGBT rights issues. Following the Lesbians and Gays Support the Miners campaign of 1984–85, the organisation's Welsh chapters participated in London's 1985 Lesbian and Gay Pride parade, and at the Labour Party's 1985 policy conference, the NUM's unanimous block voting support contributed to the successful passage of Composite 26, a resolution which formally committed the party to an LGBT rights platform.

== Decline ==
Long based in London, Scargill commissioned a new headquarters building in Sheffield, which was completed in 1988. However, with membership declining, the union relocated again in 1992, to share the Yorkshire Area offices in Barnsley.

Although weakened by the strike, the NUM was still a significant force into the early 1990s. A major scheme of closures of deep mines was announced by the government in 1992. The NUM ran a national ballot on possible strike action, and this was passed by members. It worked with the National Association of Colliery Overmen, Deputies and Shotfirers to challenge the closures in the High Court; the court imposed an emergency injunction against the closures and the strike action was called off. However, from mid-1993, the mines started closing; the number of working miners and therefore also the membership of the union continued to fall.

In 2011 the union had 1,855 members. In 2012 the union's general secretary, Chris Kitchen, admitted it was in decline after the investigative website Exaro revealed that in 2011 the Derbyshire branch had just one member who was not a paid official. Filings with the Trades Union Certification Officer showed that the NUM's Derbyshire branch had just four members, three of whom were paid officials.

In 2012, it emerged in court cases between the NUM and its former president Arthur Scargill that a substantial proportion of union members' subscriptions was being spent on expenses for Scargill, including unauthorised rent payments for a flat in London's Barbican Estate.

A further 540 miners' job losses were announced in January 2013.

== Areas ==
As of 2025, the following area unions are affiliated to the NUM:

- Colliery Officials and Staffs
- South Wales

== Landmark events ==
- 1947: nationalisation of 958 coal mines under state control; 400 small mines were left in private hands.
- 1969: a widespread unofficial strike over the pay of surface workers leads to a change in the rules on authorising a national strike: the threshold in a ballot is reduced from two-thirds to 55%.
- 1972: Official national strike. This ended in success after the Battle of Saltley Gate, where the miners' pickets were supported by solidarity strikes by engineering workers in the Birmingham area.
- 1973–74: Three-Day Week results from an overtime ban from December 1973. A vote by the NUM to strike at the end of January led Prime Minister Edward Heath to call a general election, in which he was defeated. The new government of Harold Wilson accepted the pay demand.
- 1984–85: National strike, which divided the union after the strike motion was rejected in several local ballots and the executive refused to hold a national ballot. After almost a year, the NUM returned to work having won almost no concessions. End of the closed shop with the establishment of the UDM.
- 1994: privatisation of the fifteen state-owned coal mines still in operation, with ownership transferred to the company RJB Mining.

== Officers ==
Presidents

- 1945: Will Lawther
- 1954: Ernest Jones
- 1960: Alwyn Machen
- 1960: Sidney Ford
- 1971: Joe Gormley
- 1982: Arthur Scargill (Honorary President from 2002)
- 2002: Ian Lavery
- 2010: Nicky Wilson

Vice Presidents

- 1945: Jim Bowman
- 1950: Ernest Jones
- 1954: Ted Jones
- 1960: Fred Collindridge
- 1962: Sidney Schofield
- 1972: Mick McGahey
- 1987: Sammy Thompson
- 1989: Vacant
- 1992: Frank Cave
- 2002: Keith Stanley
- 2010: Nicky Wilson
- 2010: Wayne Thomas

General Secretaries

- 1945: Ebby Edwards
- 1946: Arthur Horner
- 1959: Will Paynter
- 1968: Lawrence Daly
- 1984: Peter Heathfield
- 1992: Arthur Scargill
- 2002: Steve Kemp
- 2007: Chris Kitchen

== Notable people ==
- Dave Feickert, Industrial Relations Officer, then Head of Research 1983 to 1993, later Mines Safety Advisor NZ and China.

== See also ==
- History of coal mining in Britain
- British MPs sponsored by mining unions
- Trades Union Congress
