= Tom Brown (British politician) =

British politician (1886–1970)

Member of Parliament for Ince
- In office 20 October 1942 – 15 October 1964
- Preceded by: Gordon Macdonald
- Succeeded by: Michael McGuire

Personal details
- Born: Thomas James Brown; 12 August 1886 Leigh, Lancashire, England
- Died: 10 November 1970 (aged 84)
- Party: Labour

Thomas James Brown (12 August 1886 – 10 November 1970) was a British coal miner and Labour Party politician. During a 22-year career in Parliament he became known as the "miner's champion", fighting for compensation for those suffering from industrial diseases, and to improve state pensions.

== Miner ==
Brown was born in Leigh, in the centre of the Lancashire coalfield. He went to the Brunswick School and Leigh Technical School, but as with most of the local men, he began work in the coal mines at the age of 12 in 1898. He joined the Lancashire Miners' Federation and the Labour Representation Committee in 1903.

== Political career ==
In 1919 Brown was elected to Hindley Urban District Council, of which he was twice Chairman before standing down in 1945. He also became a Justice of the Peace for Lancashire in 1922; he held this appointment for forty years before going off the active list. He was on the Executive Committee of the Miners' Federation of Great Britain from 1922 to 1938. In 1937 he received a promotion at the mine and became a Miners' Agent instead of working underground; he was an exchange delegate to the French Miners' Congress in 1938.

== Election to Parliament ==
As Vice-President of the Lancashire and Cheshire Miners' Federation, Brown won the Miners' Federation nomination for the vacated seat of Ince where the sitting Member of Parliament (MP) was made a Regional Controller for the Ministry of Fuel and Power. Brown was elected unopposed.

He concentrated on the problems of the mining industry and miners, calling for the abolition of the means test for retired miners. Along with the majority of Labour backbenchers, Brown voted against the wartime government's decision to postpone implementation of the Beveridge report. He called for increases in the level of the state pension.

== Campaigns ==
Brown was allied with the left on issues such as the grant to members of the royal family and continuing National Service. He especially campaigned for compensation to ex-miners suffering from lung diseases, and welcomed moves by the government in 1954 to institute a compensation scheme. In 1956 he argued strongly against a bill which would allow licensed premises at airports to sell alcohol, saying that there was much evidence of aircraft being endangered by drink-sodden passengers. Brown was specifically concerned with protecting pensioners from increases in the price of cigarettes, and moved an amendment to the 1956 budget to exempt pensioners from the rise in cigarette duty.

In 1958 Brown, then chairman of the Lancashire and Cheshire group of Labour MPs, organised a delegation to the government calling for a complete prohibition of textile imports from Hong Kong, Pakistan and India. The group argued that these goods were produced by sweated labour, and that the Lancashire textile industry needed protection. A strong supporter of state ownership of the mining industry, Brown rejected moves to restrict the borrowing power of the National Coal Board.

== Retirement ==
In poor health and in his mid seventies, Brown announced in August 1961 his decision not to fight the next election on doctor's advice. In 1962, having come out of hospital to attend a debate on nurses' pay, he declared he felt as walked out that he would have been willing to give nurses the whole Treasury.

Parliament of the United Kingdom
Preceded by Gordon Macdonald	Member of Parliament for Ince; 1942–1964	Succeeded by Michael McGuire
