= Josh Simons =

British politician (born 1993)

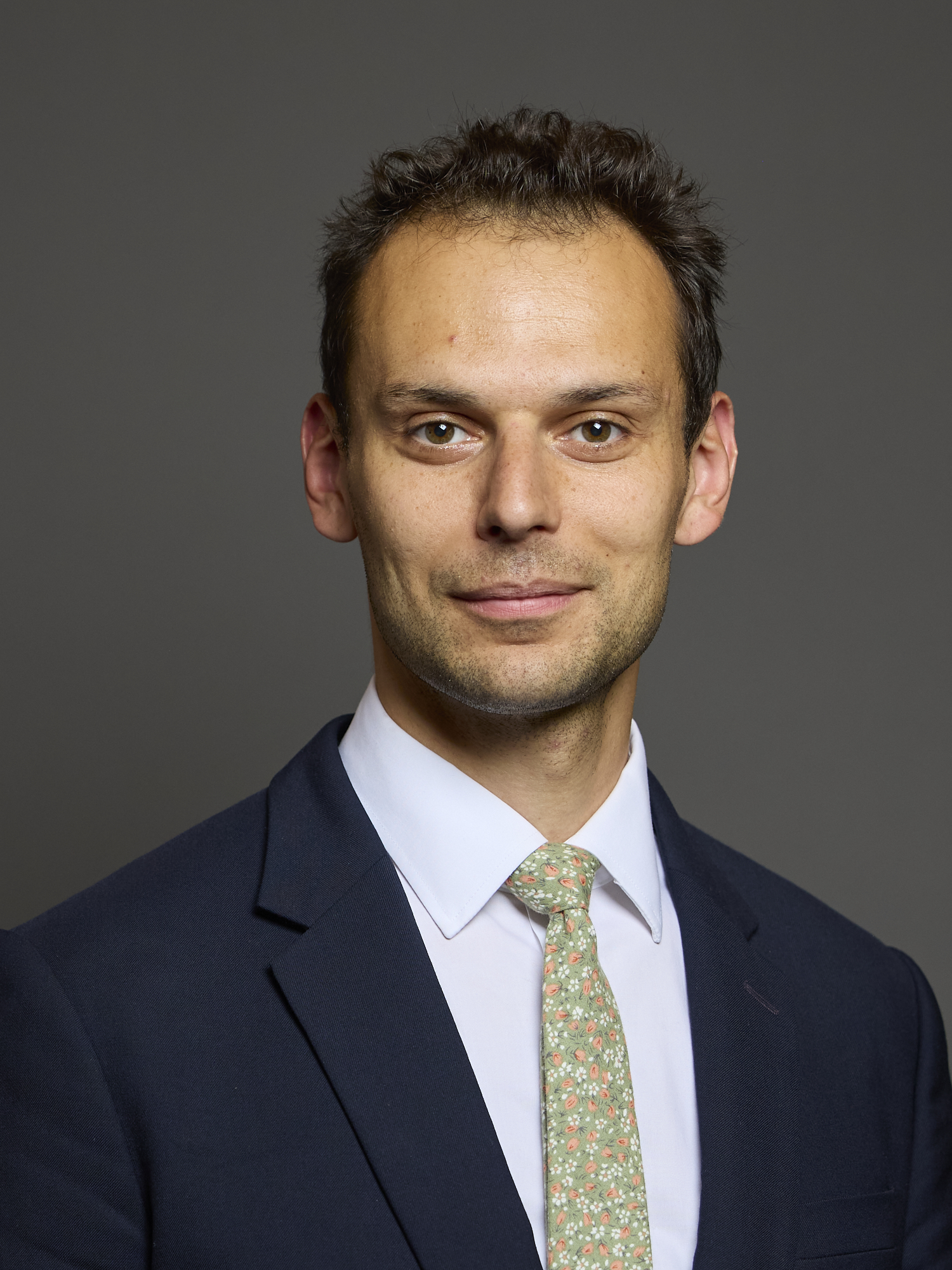
- Official portrait, 2024

Parliamentary Under-Secretary of State for Digital ID
- In office 9 January 2026 – 1 March 2026
- Prime Minister: Keir Starmer
- Preceded by: Office established
- Succeeded by: James Frith

Parliamentary Secretary for the Cabinet Office
- In office 7 September 2025 – 1 March 2026 Serving with Satvir Kaur, Chris Ward
- Prime Minister: Keir Starmer
- Preceded by: Georgia Gould; Abena Oppong-Asare
- Succeeded by: Ruth Anderson; James Frith

Member of Parliament for Makerfield
- In office 4 July 2024 – 18 May 2026
- Preceded by: Yvonne Fovargue
- Succeeded by: Andy Burnham

Personal details
- Born: Joshua Cameron Simons; 24 July 1993 (age 33)
- Party: Labour
- Children: 3
- Education: St John's College, Cambridge (BA); Harvard University (PhD)

Joshua Cameron Simons (born 24 July 1993) is a British politician who served as the Member of Parliament (MP) for Makerfield from 2024 to 2026. A member of the Labour Party, he served as Parliamentary Under-Secretary of State for Digital ID from January to March 2026.

In early 2026, it was reported that Simons had been responsible for investigating the private affairs of journalists who had published an article unfavourable to Labour Together, a think tank he ran. Simons was accused of naming them to British intelligence, and falsely linking them to pro-Russian propaganda. On 28 February 2026, he resigned his ministerial positions, and on 14 May 2026 announced that he would be standing down from Parliament in order to allow Andy Burnham to successfully contest the ensuing by-election. On 17 July 2026, Burnham won the Labour leadership election uncontested, becoming prime minister on 20 July.

== Early life and education ==
Josh Simons was born on 24 July 1993. His father was Jewish and from Bury, Greater Manchester. He was educated at The Perse School in Cambridge.

At St John's College, Cambridge, Simons read social and political sciences, graduating with a Bachelor of Arts, supervised by Helen Thompson. He was an editor of the student newspapers Varsity and The Tab. He went on to complete a doctorate in government, political theory and political science at Harvard University which he later adapted into his book Algorithms for the People: Democracy in the Age of AI. He subsequently held a postdoctoral fellowship at Harvard.

== Early career ==
After graduating from Cambridge, Simons worked as a research assistant to Amartya Sen at the university before joining the Institute for Public Policy Research in 2015. That year he became a policy adviser to Jeremy Corbyn following Corbyn's election as Labour leader. Despite reports he resigned after demotion due to "suspected leaking", Simons cited the party's "persistent failure" to tackle antisemitism as the reason for his departure from Corbyn's office. He later contributed to the Equality and Human Rights Commission's investigation into Labour antisemitism. After leaving the Leader's Office he worked briefly for London Labour before returning to Cambridge as a research assistant to Helen Thompson.

Between 2018 and 2022, Simons worked for Meta as a Visiting Research Scientist in its artificial intelligence programme. He has subsequently said that during this period he repeatedly warned the company's leadership about the addictive risks of its technology to children. In 2025, Simons was subpoenaed in multi-district litigation against Meta over social media harms in the United States, and in 2026 two separate American juries found that Meta had knowingly designed addictive products that harmed children, including in the California case for which Simons had been deposed.

In the 2021 Bury Metropolitan Borough Council election, Simons stood as the Labour and Co-operative candidate in Church ward, finishing second to the Conservative candidate.

== Director of Labour Together ==
In 2022 Simons became the director of the think tank Labour Together, which he led until his Parliamentary selection in 2024.

He provoked strong criticism in February 2024 when, during an interview with LBC, he suggested that Channel smuggling gangs should be put on a barge and sent to Scotland. Anas Sarwar, the Scottish Labour leader, condemned the comments as "stupid" and "cringe". Labour MSP Monica Lennon said: "There should be no place in the Labour Party for these disgraceful comments." Simons apologised, saying the remarks were made "in jest".

In February 2026, it was reported that PR firm APCO Worldwide had investigated the private affairs of several journalists after being commissioned by Labour Together whilst Simons was director, to ascertain the source of reports about Labour Together's late declaration of certain donations. Simons was accused of naming them to British intelligence, and falsely linking them to pro-Russian propaganda. On 28 February 2026, he resigned his ministerial positions, stating that while he had not breached the Ministerial Code, the allegations had become a "distraction" from the government's work.

The Sunday Times reported that the APCO report, named "Operation Cannon", was written by a former Sunday Times employee and was shown to Labour shadow cabinet members, falsely suggesting that two Sunday Times journalists were part of a Russian campaign to politically harm Starmer. Labour Together sent a shorter version of the APCO report to GCHQ's National Cyber Security Centre (NCSC), which declined to investigate. Prime Minister Keir Starmer asked the Independent Advisor on Ministerial Standards to investigate whether Simons had breached the Ministerial Code. In a letter to the Prime Minister, the Independent Advisor found there was "no basis" for advising "of any breach of the Ministerial Code" by Simons, but that the story may continue to pose "potential reputational damage" to his government.

On 14 May 2026, Simons announced that he would be standing down from Parliament, in order to allow Andy Burnham to successfully contest the ensuing by-election.

== Parliamentary career ==
=== MP ===
Simons was elected as MP for Makerfield at the 2024 general election. He was selected by Labour's National Executive Committee several weeks before the election, after Yvonne Fovargue announced that she would not seek re-election. Simons is a co-founder and co-chair of the Labour Growth Group.

In May 2026, after damaging losses for Labour in local elections, Simons called for Keir Starmer to step down as Prime Minister and begin an orderly transition to find a successor. The following week, Simons announced his resignation as an MP, triggering a by-election so that Andy Burnham could stand for the constituency, following speculation around an ensuing Labour party leadership election. Burnham won the by-election.

On 17 July 2026, Burnham won the Labour leadership election uncontested and on 20 July, he became prime minister.

=== PPS ===
In November 2024, Simons was appointed Parliamentary Private Secretary for the Department for Environment Food and Rural Affairs (DEFRA), subsequently becoming a PPS for the Ministry of Justice.

=== Minister ===
In the 2025 British cabinet reshuffle, Simons was appointed Parliamentary Secretary for the Cabinet Office, covering the maternity leave of Satvir Kaur under the Ministerial and other Maternity Allowances Act 2021. On 9 January 2026 he was additionally appointed Parliamentary Under Secretary of State at the Department for Science, Innovation and Technology, with responsibility for the design and cross-government delivery of digital ID, data transformation and digital public services. Simons resigned from both ministerial positions on 1 March 2026 due to his role in the smear campaign against journalists but having been cleared of any breach of the Ministerial Code.

== Personal life ==
Simons met his wife at Harvard University. They have three children.

Parliament of the United Kingdom
Preceded by Yvonne Fovargue	Member of Parliament for Makerfield; 2024–2026	Succeeded by Andy Burnham
