= Henry Blundell-Hollinshead-Blundell =

British politician

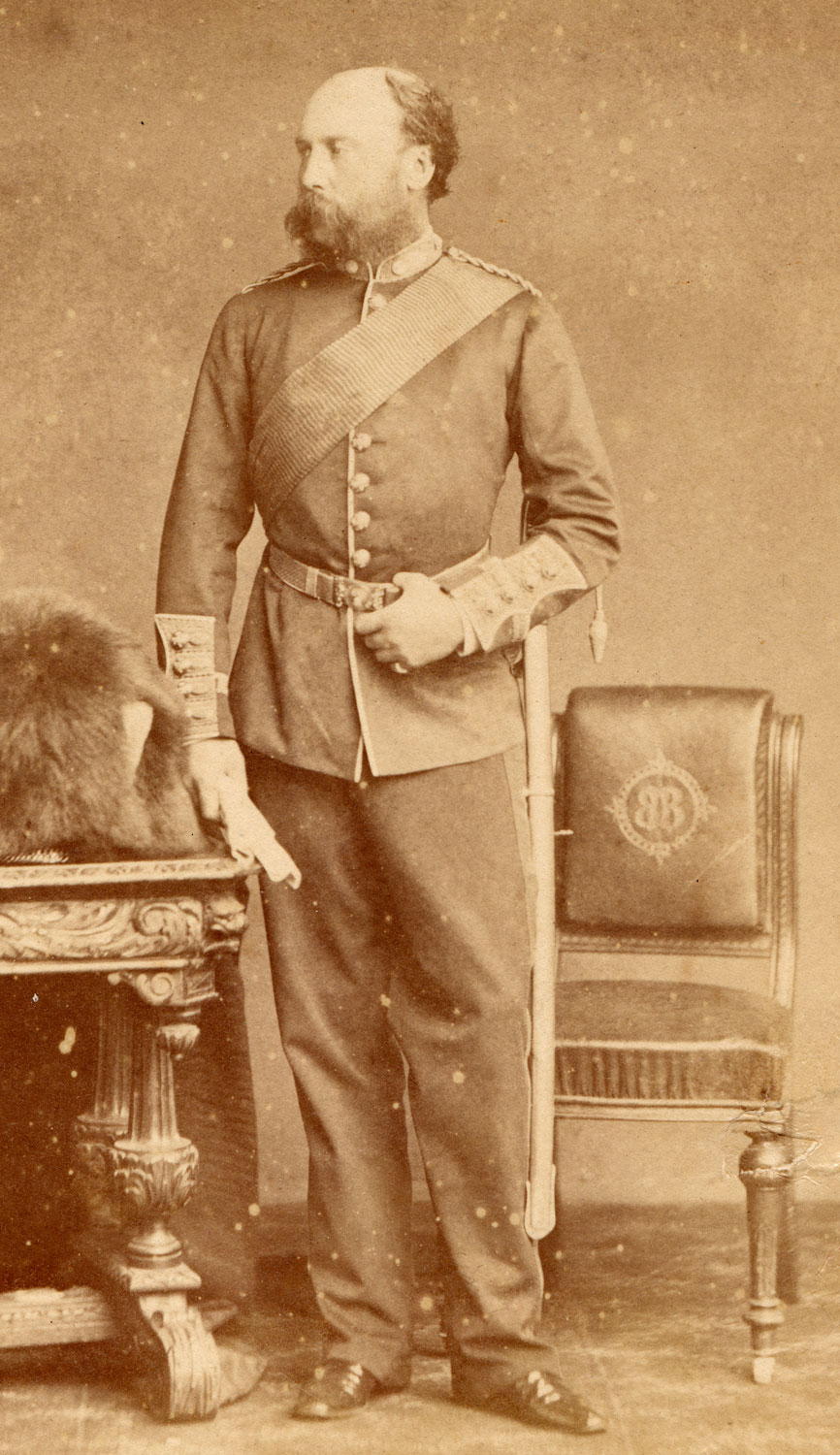
Colonel Henry Blundell-Hollinshead-Blundell circa 1862

Colonel Henry Blundell-Hollinshead Blundell CB DL (24 January 1831 – 28 September 1906) was a British army officer and Conservative politician.

He was the eldest son of Richard Benson Blundell-Hollinshead Blundell of Deysbrook and Jane Leigh. He was educated at Eton College and Christ Church, Oxford, graduating in 1854.

== Early life ==
Henry Blundell-Hollinshead-Blundell was born at Deysbrook, near Liverpool, on 24 January 1831, the eldest son of Richard Benson Blundell-Hollinshead-Blundell. He was educated at Eton College between 1843 and 1849. He was a skilled oarsman, rowing in the VIII in 1848 and 1849, and becoming Captain of the Boats in 1849. He was a member of the Field XI and of Eton's elite Oppidan Wall, captaining the latter team in 1848. He went on to the University of Oxford, entering Christ Church, Oxford, where he read classics, graduating in 1853 with a degree in arts.

== Military career ==
His military career began in 1855 when he became an ensign in the Rifle Brigade, serving in the Crimean War and then moving to Canada during the Trent Affair. He subsequently transferred to the Grenadier Guards. Between 1870 and 1871 he served as Aide-de-Camp to His Serene Highness Prince Edward of Saxe-Weimar, and afterwards becoming Assistant Adjutant-General of the Home District at the Horse Guards in 1877. He received the brevet of Colonel 1 April 1881, and in 1884-5 served with the Nile Expedition, for the relief of General Gordon, on the Staff as Inspecting Officer of the Lines of Communication, and afterwards as Commandant at Dongola, for his services being mentioned in Despatches and receiving the medal, with clasp and the Khedive's Star. He was admitted to the Military Division of the Most Honourable Order of the Bath in 1887 and retired 24 June 1889.

== Marriage ==
In 1863 he married Beatrice Byng, daughter of Vice-Admiral the Honourable Henry Dilkes Byng. Beatrice served as maid of honour to Queen Victoria. The couple had no children, and she died in 1884. Blundell-Hollinshead-Blundell commissioned the building of St Matthew's Church, Highfield, Wigan in her memory. The church was in an area of the Lancashire Coalfield owned by the Blundell family. Having left no issue, the bulk of his estate passed to his nephew, Major Cuthbert Leigh Blundell-H-B CBE, the surviving son of his brother, Rev. Canon Thomas Blundell-Hollinshead-Blundell, Rector of St Cuthbert's Church, Halsall and Hon. Chaplain to Queen Victoria.

== Political career ==
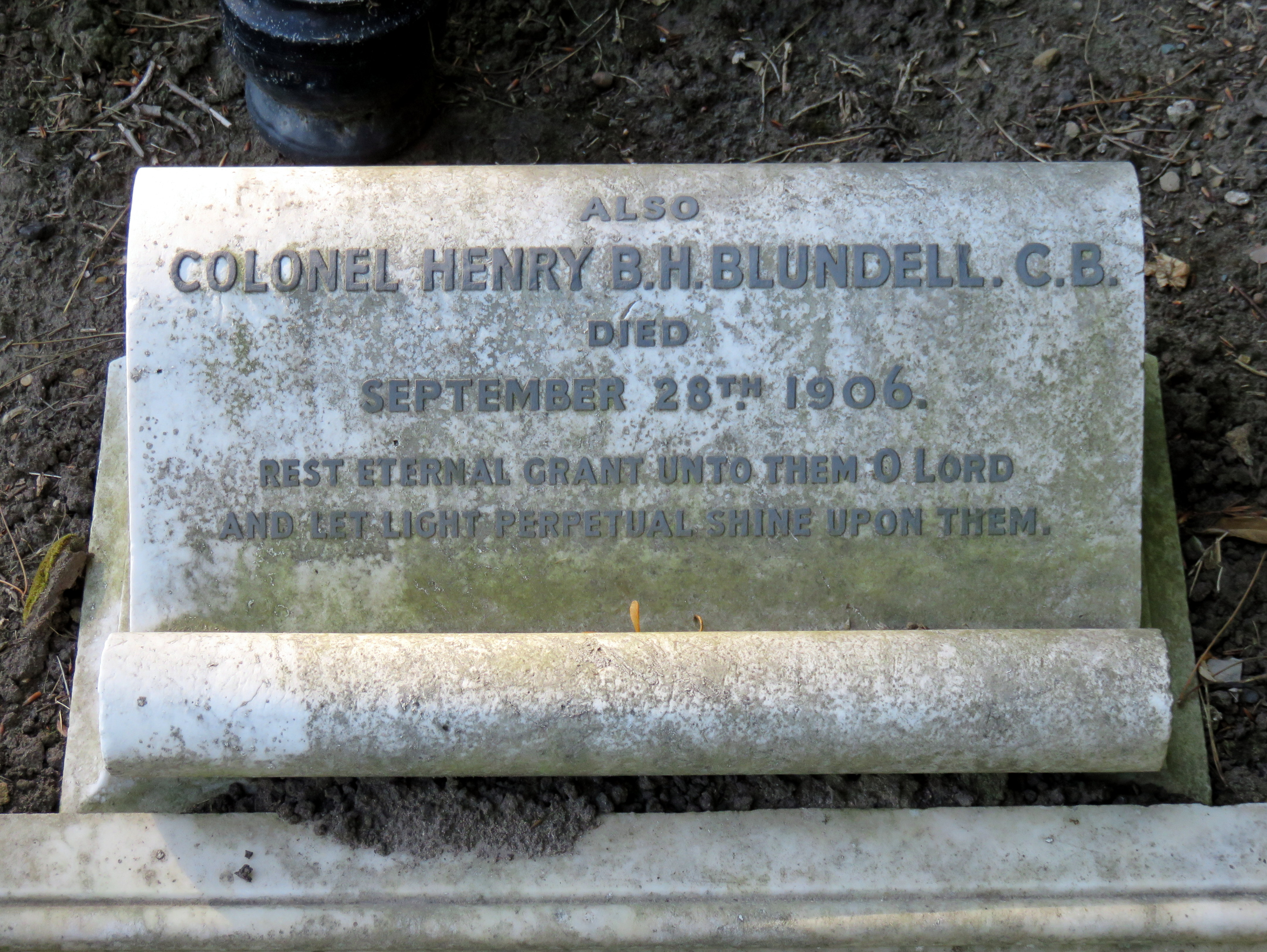
Grave of Henry Blundell-Hollinshead-Blundell at Halsall.

He successfully stood for the Conservative Party in the 1885 general election, becoming the Member of Parliament for Ince. He lost the seat in 1892, but regained it in 1895. He remained Ince's MP until he was heavily defeated at the general election of January 1906.

Henry Blundell-Hollinshead-Blundell died on 28 September the same year, and was buried on 2 October at St Cuthbert's Churchyard in Halsall, near Ormskirk.

Parliament of the United Kingdom
New constituency	Member of Parliament for Ince; 1885 – 1892	Succeeded by Sam Woods
Preceded by Sam Woods	Member of Parliament for Ince; 1895 – 1906	Succeeded by Stephen Walsh
