= Parliamentary Secretary for the Cabinet Office =

Junior role in the British government

United Kingdom Parliamentary Secretary for the Cabinet Office
- Royal Arms of His Majesty's Government

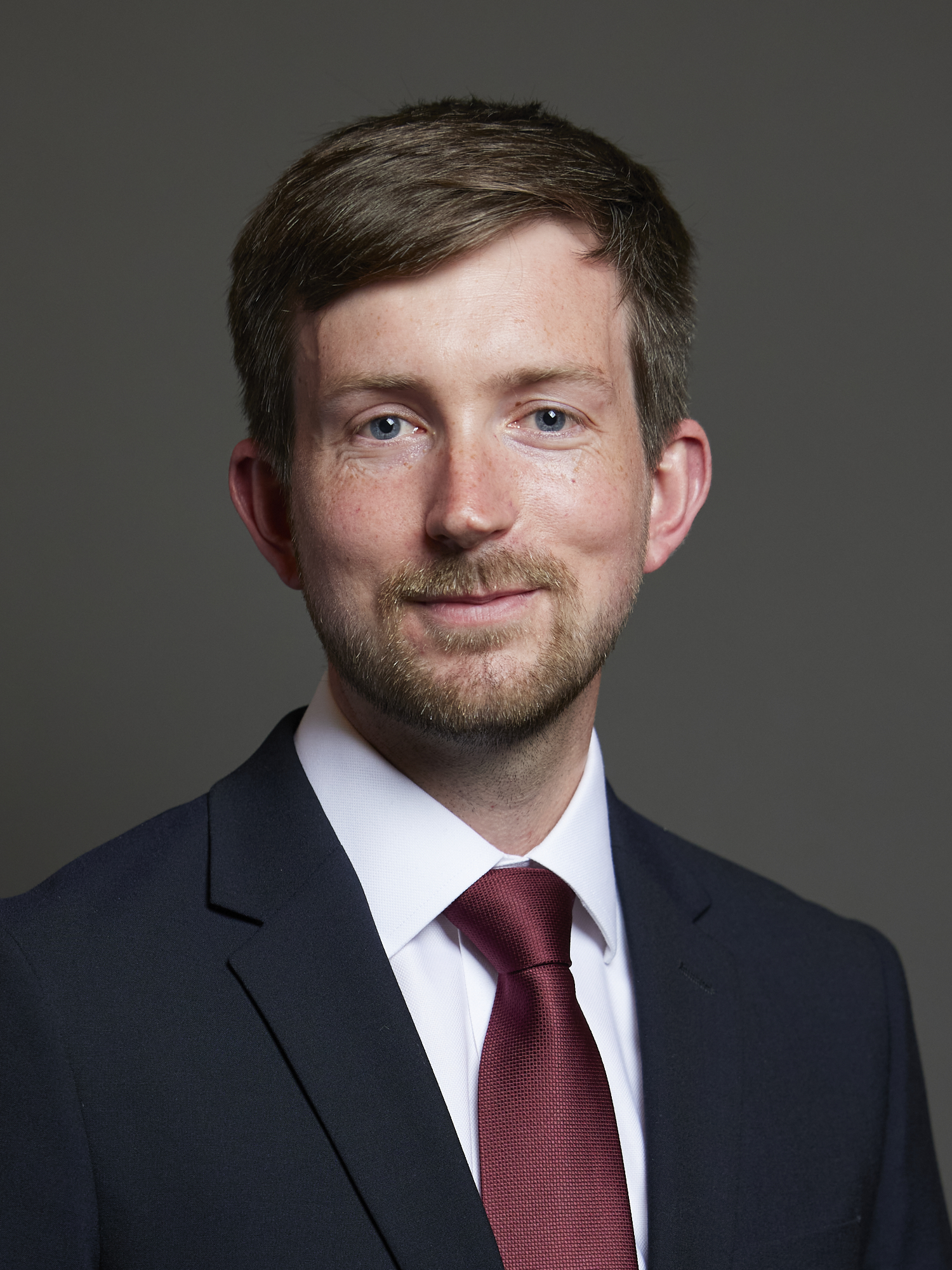
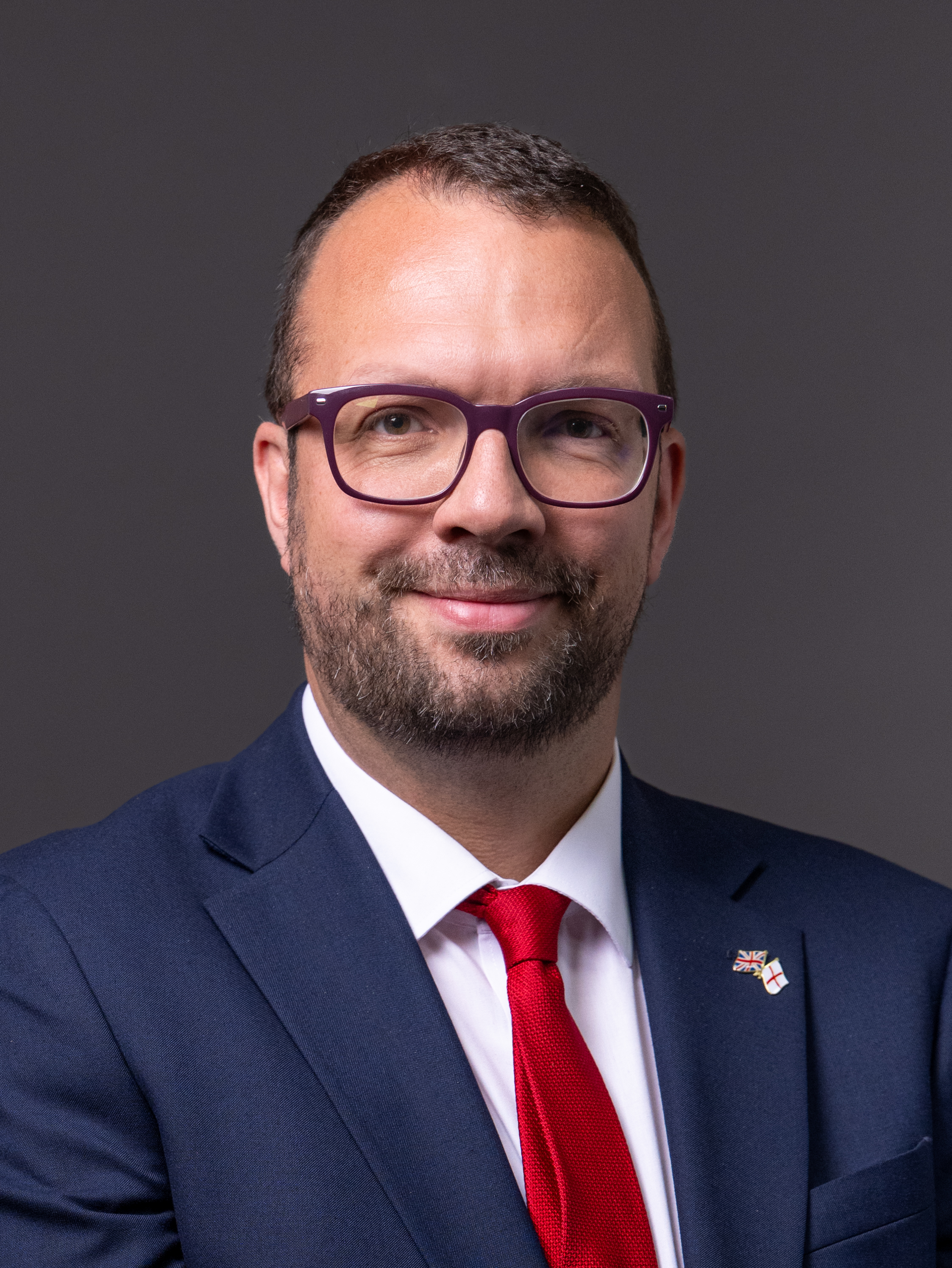
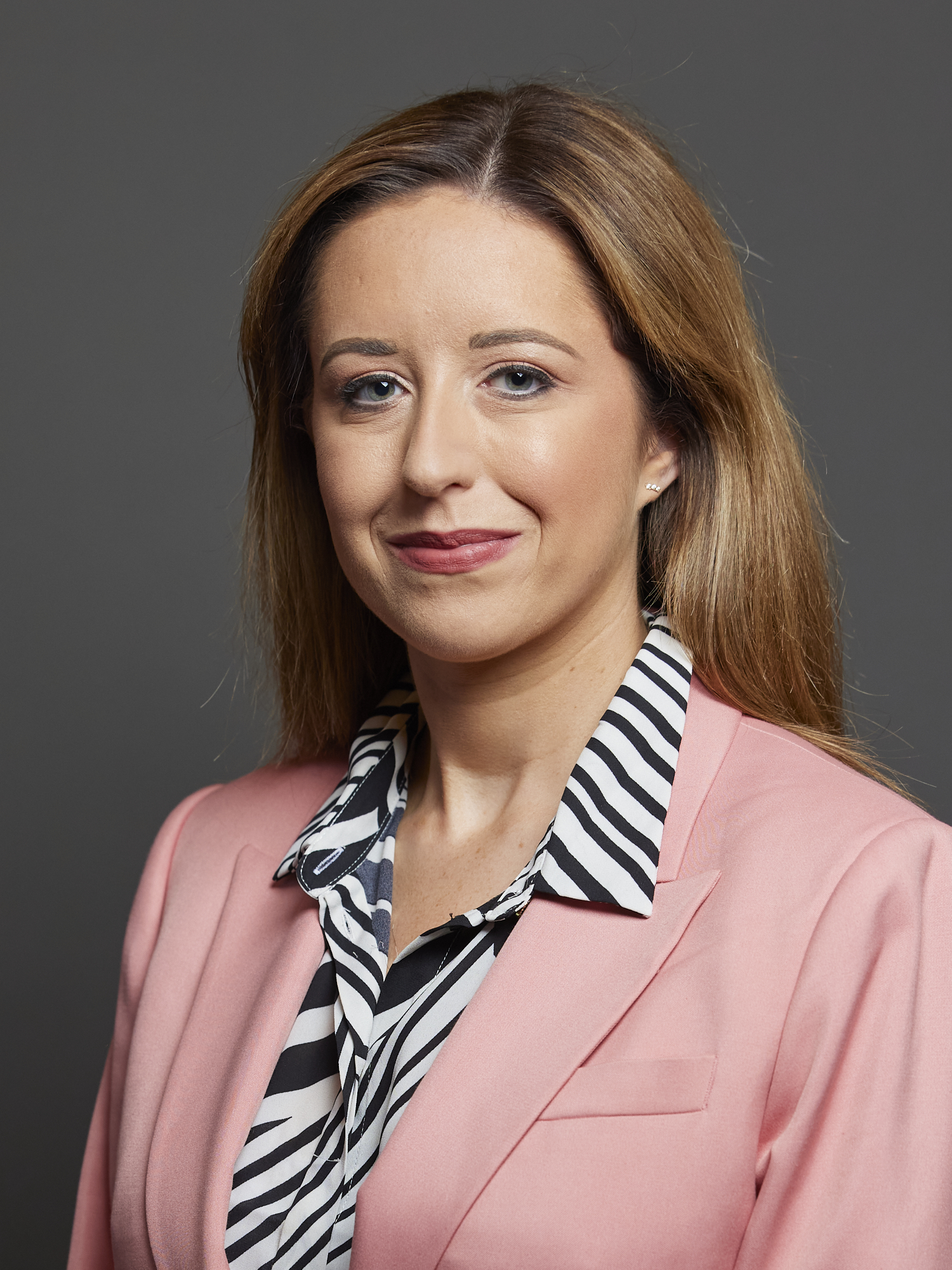
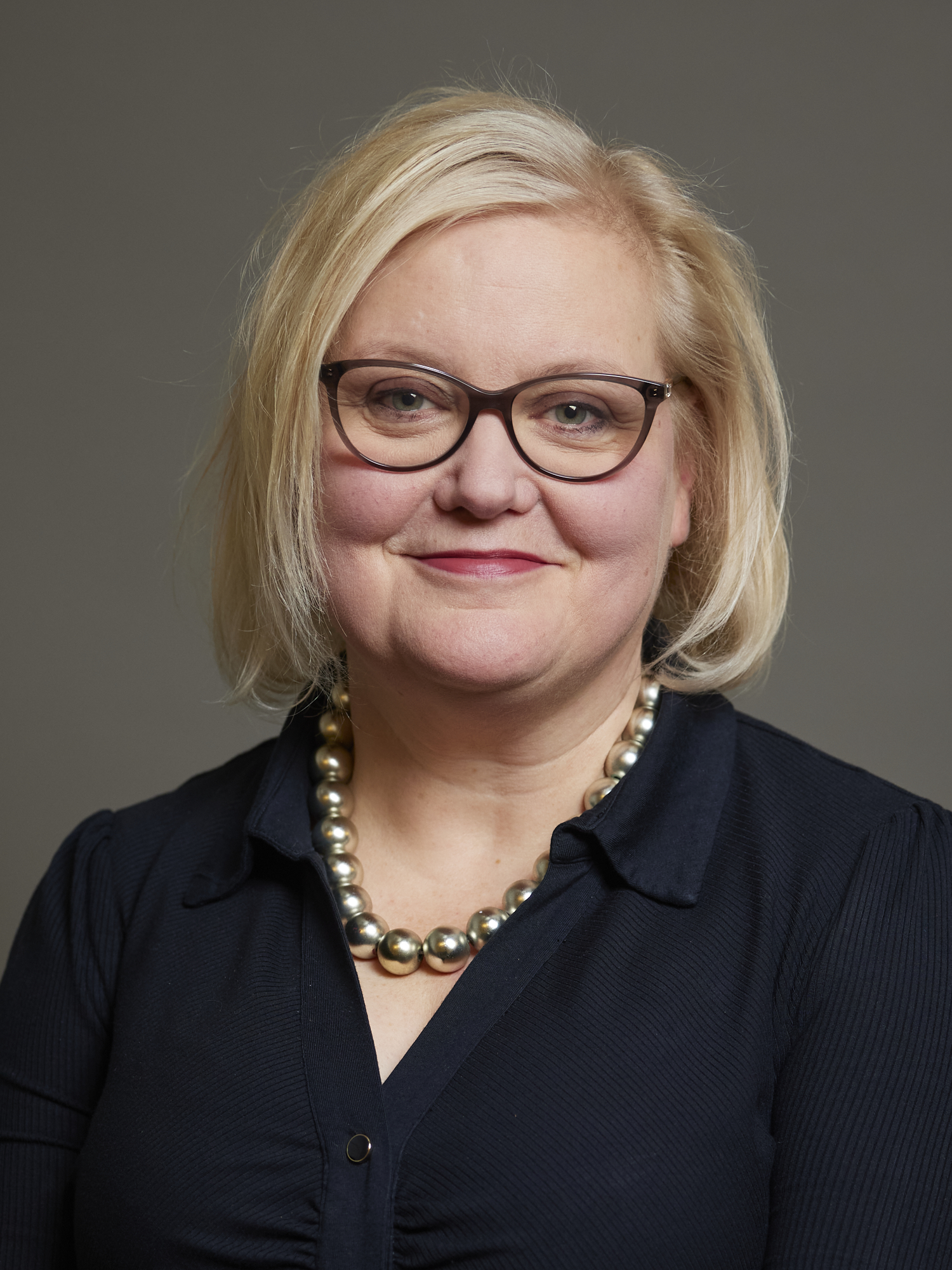
- Incumbent; Dan Tomlinson; Mark Ferguson; Sally Jameson; Fiona Twycross, Baroness Twycross since 22 July 2026
- Cabinet Office
- Style: Minister
- Reports to: Chancellor of the Duchy of Lancaster; First Secretary of State
- Nominator: Prime Minister of the United Kingdom
- Appointer: The Monarch; on advice of the Prime Minister
- Term length: At His Majesty's pleasure
- Salary: £102,061 as of 1st April 2022

The parliamentary secretary for the Cabinet Office is a junior ministerial role at the Cabinet Office of the United Kingdom.

== History ==
| Name | Portrait | Term of office | | Party | Prime Minister |
Parliamentary Secretary for the Cabinet Office
| Graham Stringer | | 9 November 1999 | 7 June 2001 | Labour | Blair I |
| Chris Leslie | | 11 June 2001 | 29 May 2002 | Labour | Blair II |
Minister of State for the Cabinet Office
| Douglas Alexander | | 29 May 2002 | 13 June 2003 | Labour | Blair II |
| Ruth Kelly | | 9 September 2004 | 15 December 2004 | Labour | Blair II |
| David Miliband | | 16 December 2004 | 6 May 2005 | Labour | Blair II |
Parliamentary Secretary for the Cabinet Office
| Jim Murphy | | 5 May 2005 | 5 May 2006 | Labour | Blair III |
| Pat McFadden | | 5 May 2006 | 28 June 2007 | Labour | Blair III |
| Gillian Merron | | 28 June 2007 | 24 January 2008 | Labour | Brown |
| Tom Watson | | 25 January 2008 | 5 June 2009 | Labour | Brown |
| Shriti Vadera, Baroness Vadera | | 25 January 2008 | 25 September 2009 | Labour | Brown |
| Dawn Butler | | 3 November 2009 | 11 May 2010 | Labour | Brown |
Role merged with Parliamentary Secretary for Political and Constitutional Reform
Parliamentary Secretary for the Cabinet Office Role formed out of Parliamentary Secretary for the Constitution
| The Lord Bridges of Headley | | 29 May 2015 | 12 July 2016 | Conservatives | Cameron (II) |
| Caroline Nokes | | 14 June 2017 | 8 January 2018 | Conservatives | May (II) |
| Oliver Dowden | | 9 January 2018 | 24 July 2019 | Conservatives | Johnson (I) |
| Simon Hart | | 24 July 2019 | 16 December 2019 | Conservatives | Johnson (I) |
| Jeremy Quin | | 16 December 2019 | 13 February 2020 | Conservatives | Johnson (II) |
| Julia Lopez | | 13 February 2020 | 15 September 2021 | Conservatives | Johnson (II) |
| Heather Wheeler | | 8 February 2022 | 7 September 2022 | Conservatives | Johnson (II) |
| Brendan Clarke-Smith | | 8 September 2022 | 27 October 2022 | Conservatives | Truss |
| Alex Burghart | | 27 October 2022 | 5 July 2024 | Conservatives | Sunak |
| Abena Oppong-Asare | | 9 July 2024 | 6 September 2025 | Labour | Starmer |
| Georgia Gould | | 9 July 2024 | 6 September 2025 | Labour | Starmer |
| Chris Ward | | 6 September 2025 | 22 July 2026 | Labour | Starmer |
| Satvir Kaur | | 7 September 2025 | 22 July 2026 | Labour | Starmer |
| Josh Simons | | 7 September 2025 | 28 February 2026 | Labour | Starmer |
| The Baroness Anderson of Stoke-on-Trent | | 3 March 2026 | 22 July 2026 | Labour | Starmer |
| James Frith | | 3 March 2026 | 22 July 2026 | Labour | Starmer |
| Dan Tomlinson | | 22 July 2026 | Incumbent | Labour | Burnham |
| Mark Ferguson | | 22 July 2026 | Incumbent | Labour | Burnham |
| Sally Jameson | | 22 July 2026 | Incumbent | Labour | Burnham |
| Fiona Twycross, Baroness Twycross | | 22 July 2026 | Incumbent | Labour | Burnham |
