= 1942 Ince by-election =

UK Parliamentary by-election

The 1942 Ince by-election was held on 20 October 1942. The by-election was held due to the appointment as north-west regional fuel controller of the incumbent Labour MP, Gordon Macdonald. It was won by the unopposed Labour candidate Tom Brown.
