= Parliamentary Under-Secretary of State for Digital ID =

Junior minister in the British Government

United Kingdom Parliamentary Under-Secretary of State for Digital ID
- Royal Arms of His Majesty's Government
- Department for Science, Innovation and Technology and Cabinet Office
- Style: Minister
- Status: Abolished
- Appointer: The monarch (on the advice of the prime minister)
- Term length: At His Majesty's pleasure
- Formation: 9 January 2026
- First holder: Josh Simons
- Final holder: James Frith
- Abolished: 22 July 2026

The parliamentary under-secretary of state for digital ID was a junior position in the Department for Science, Innovation and Technology and the Cabinet Office in the British government. The post was last held by James Frith

== Responsibilities ==
The minister has responsibility of the following policy areas:

- Digital ID

== List of officeholders ==
| Name | Portrait | Term of office | | Party | Prime Minister |
|---|---|---|---|---|---|
| Josh Simons | | 9 January 2026 | 1 March 2026 | Labour | Keir Starmer |
| James Frith | | 3 March 2026 | 22 July 2026 | Labour | Keir Starmer |
