= Baron Macdonald of Gwaenysgor =

Extinct barony in the Peerage of the United Kingdom

Baron Macdonald of Gwaenysgor, of Gwaenysgor in the County of Flint, was a title in the Peerage of the United Kingdom. It was created on 13 April 1949 for Sir Gordon Macdonald, the last British governor of Newfoundland. The title became extinct on the death of his son, the second Baron, in 2002.

== Barons Macdonald of Gwaenysgor (1949) ==
- Gordon Macdonald, 1st Baron Macdonald of Gwaenysgor (1888–1966)
- Gordon Ramsay MacDonald, 2nd Baron Macdonald of Gwaenysgor (1915–2002)
