= Makerfield (constituency) =

UK Parliament constituency (since 1983)

- County constituency for the House of Commons
- Interactive map of boundaries since 2024
- Location within North West England
- County: Greater Manchester
- Electorate: 76,517 (March 2020)
- Major settlements: Wigan (part), Hindley and Ashton-in-Makerfield

Current constituency
- Created: 1983
- Member of Parliament: Andy Burnham (Labour Co-op)
- Seats: One
- Created from: Ince, Wigan, Newton, Westhoughton

Makerfield (/ˈmeɪkərfiːld/) is a constituency (Note: A county constituency (for the purposes of election expenses and type of returning officer).) in Greater Manchester represented in the House of Commons of the UK Parliament. It is currently represented by Andy Burnham, the current Prime Minister, who was elected after Josh Simons' resignation to allow Burnham to run in a by-election in June 2026. The seat has had only Labour MPs since its creation in 1983.

== History ==
This seat was formed in 1983 from parts of the Ince, Wigan, Leigh, Newton and Westhoughton constituencies.

== Constituency profile ==
Makerfield is considered one of the safest Labour seats in the country, in terms of length of tenure by the party. The Labour Party held the predecessor seat of Ince from 1906 until 1983 when the current constituency was created. In 2010 the constituency, of the 650 nationally, polled the 105th-highest share of the vote for the Labour Party.

Ashton-in-Makerfield

Labour's majority fell significantly in 2019 as with many "Red Wall" seats, however it did not fall to the Conservatives, unlike neighbouring Leigh. In 2024, there was little increase in Labour's share of the vote or majority, instead there was a significant increase in Reform UK's vote share, pushing the Conservatives into third place. In 2015, Reform's predecessor, UKIP, also came second, however Labour's majority was over 13,000, compared to over 5,000 over Reform in 2024. The 2026 by-election, however, saw a 3.5% swing back to Labour, in marked contrast to Reform comfortably leading the national polls at the time of the election.

There is no town called Makerfield itself; instead, the name refers to the suffix of 'in-Makerfield' of the towns Ashton-in-Makerfield and Ince-in-Makerfield, though since 2010 the latter has been part of the Wigan constituency. The seat comprises mostly working-class residential suburbs south of Wigan and to the west of Leigh. Deprivation is lower than that of neighbouring towns, and home ownership is higher, with a mostly skilled working-class population and a lower-than-average proportion of ethnic minorities. There is some semi-rural land towards the west of the constituency where it borders St Helens North, and green buffers separating the constituent towns and villages. The area was formerly noted for coal-mining. There remains a small amount of light industry – though not as much as in Wigan – but residential land-use is increasing as the towns continue to grow. The area is also home to Winstanley College, one of the highest-performing sixth-form colleges in the country, which has around 1800 students enrolled.

== Boundaries ==
=== Historic ===
1983–1997: The Metropolitan Borough of Wigan wards of Abram, Ashton-Golborne, Bryn, Lightshaw, Orrell, Winstanley, and Worsley Mesnes.

1997–2010: The Metropolitan Borough of Wigan wards of Abram, Ashton-Golborne, Bryn, Ince, Orrell, Winstanley, and Worsley Mesnes.

2010–2024: The Metropolitan Borough of Wigan wards of Abram, Ashton, Bryn, Hindley, Hindley Green, Orrell, Winstanley, and Worsley Mesnes.

=== Current ===
Further to the 2023 review of Westminster constituencies which came into effect for 2024 general election, the boundaries of the constituency were expanded slightly by adding small areas (as they existed on 1 December 2020) of the Atherleigh ward (part of polling district LCA) and the Leigh West ward (polling district LDA).

Following a local government boundary review which came into effect in May 2023, the constituency now comprises the following wards of the Metropolitan Borough of Wigan from the 2024 general election:

- Abram; Ashton-in-Makerfield South; Bryn with Ashton-in-Makerfield North; Hindley; Hindley Green (nearly all); Leigh West (small part); Orrell; Winstanley; Worsley Mesnes; and very small parts of Golborne & Lowton West, and Ince.

Makerfield consists of the western and central section of the Metropolitan Borough of Wigan in Greater Manchester. It comprises the wards to the south and to the west of Wigan and to the west of Leigh.

== Members of Parliament ==
Election	Member	Party
1983	Michael McGuire	Labour
1987	Ian McCartney	Labour
2010	Yvonne Fovargue	Labour
2024	Josh Simons	Labour
2026 by-election	Andy Burnham	Labour Co-op

== Elections ==
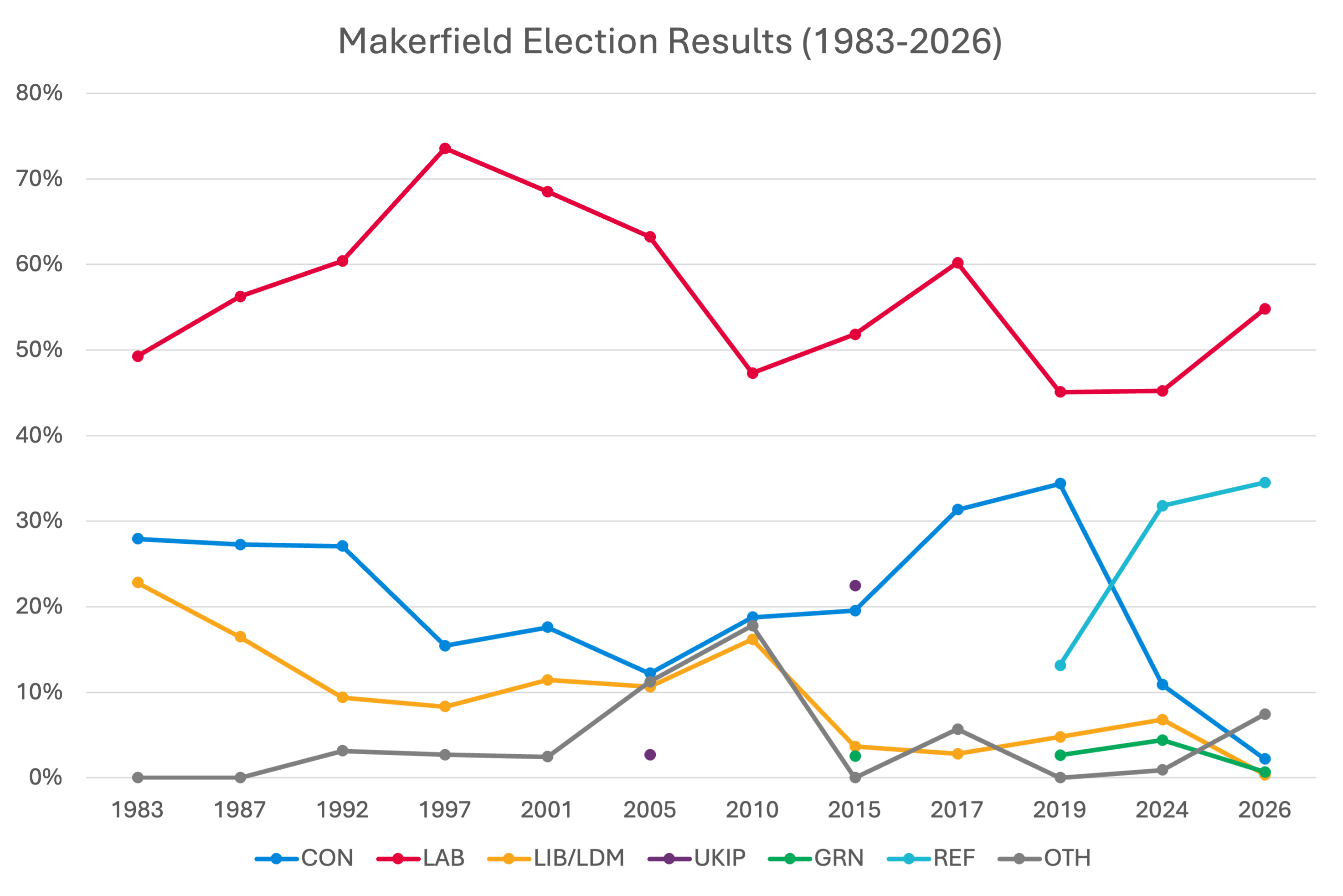
Makerfield electoral results 1983–2026

=== Elections in the 2020s ===
2026 Makerfield by-election
Party	Candidate	Votes	%	±%
Labour Co-op	Andy Burnham	24,927	54.8	+9.6
Reform	Robert Kenyon	15,696	34.5	+2.7
Restore	Rebecca Shepherd	3,111	6.8	New
Conservative	Michael Winstanley	997	2.2	−8.7
Green	Sarah Wakefield	308	0.7	−3.7
Liberal Democrats	Jake Austin	163	0.4	−6.4
Binface	Count Binface	95	0.2	New
Monster Raving Loony	Howling Laud Hope	45	0.1	New
Independent	John Dyer	37	0.1	New
Rejoin EU (Note: Using the description Rejoin EU Bring In PR)	Peter Ward	35	0.1	New
Libertarian	Dan Clarke	18	0.04	New
Climate	Ed Gemmell	18	0.04	New
Independent	Robert Pownall	18	0.04	New
Independent	Paul Gould	8	0.02	New
Majority		9,231	20.3	+6.9
Turnout		45,476	58.7	+6.3
Registered electors		77,462		
Labour Co-op hold		Swing	3.5	

General election 2024: Makerfield
Party	Candidate	Votes	%	±%
Labour	Josh Simons	18,202	45.2	−0.1
Reform	Robert Kenyon	12,803	31.8	+18.7
Conservative	Simon Finkelstein	4,379	10.9	−23.4
Liberal Democrats	John Skipworth	2,735	6.8	+2.0
Green	Maria Deery	1,776	4.4	+1.8
English Democrat	Thomas Bryer	368	0.9	N/A
Majority		5,399	13.4	+2.4
Turnout		40,263	52.5	−7.2
Registered electors		76,641		
Labour hold		Swing	−9.4	

=== Elections in the 2010s ===
2019 notional result
Party	Vote	%
Labour	20,432	45.3
Conservative	15,477	34.3
Brexit Party	5,902	13.1
Liberal Democrats	2,161	4.8
Green	1,166	2.6
Turnout	45,138	59.0
Electorate	76,517	

General election 2019: Makerfield
Party	Candidate	Votes	%	±%
Labour	Yvonne Fovargue	19,954	45.1	−15.0
Conservative	Nick King	15,214	34.4	+3.1
Brexit Party	Ross Wright	5,817	13.1	N/A
Liberal Democrats	John Skipworth	2,108	4.8	+2.0
Green	Sheila Shaw	1,166	2.6	N/A
Majority		4,740	10.7	−18.1
Turnout		44,259	59.7	−4.1
Labour hold		Swing	−9.2	

General election 2017: Makerfield
Party	Candidate	Votes	%	±%
Labour	Yvonne Fovargue	28,245	60.1	+8.3
Conservative	Adam Carney	14,703	31.3	+11.8
Independent	Bob Brierley	2,663	5.7	N/A
Liberal Democrats	John Skipworth	1,322	2.8	−0.9
Majority		13,542	28.8	−0.6
Turnout		46,933	63.8	+3.6
Labour hold		Swing	−1.7	

General election 2015: Makerfield
Party	Candidate	Votes	%	±%
Labour	Yvonne Fovargue	23,208	51.8	+4.5
UKIP	Andrew Collinson	10,053	22.4	N/A
Conservative	Syeda Zaidi	8,752	19.5	+0.7
Liberal Democrats	John Skipworth	1,639	3.7	−12.5
Green	Philip Mitchell	1,136	2.5	N/A
Majority		13,155	29.4	+0.9
Turnout		44,788	60.2	+0.8
Labour hold		Swing		

General election 2010: Makerfield
Party	Candidate	Votes	%	±%
Labour	Yvonne Fovargue	20,700	47.3	−14.8
Conservative	Itrat Ali	8,210	18.8	+5.2
Liberal Democrats	Dave Crowther	7,082	16.2	+4.8
Independent	Bob Brierley	3,424	7.8	N/A
BNP	Ken Haslam	3,229	7.4	+4.1
Independent	John Mather	1,126	2.6	N/A
Majority		12,490	28.5	−22.5
Turnout		43,771	59.4	+9.8
Labour hold		Swing	−10.0	

=== Elections in the 2000s ===
General election 2005: Makerfield
Party	Candidate	Votes	%	±%
Labour	Ian McCartney	22,494	63.2	−5.3
Conservative	Kulveer Ranger	4,345	12.2	−5.4
Liberal Democrats	Trevor Beswick	3,789	10.6	−0.8
Community Action	Peter Franzen	2,769	7.8	N/A
BNP	Dennis Shambley	1,221	3.4	N/A
UKIP	Gregory Atherton	962	2.7	N/A
Majority		18,149	51.0	+0.1
Turnout		35,580	51.5	+0.6
Labour hold		Swing	+0.1	

General election 2001: Makerfield
Party	Candidate	Votes	%	±%
Labour	Ian McCartney	23,879	68.5	−5.2
Conservative	Jane Brooks	6,129	17.6	+2.2
Liberal Democrats	David Crowther	3,990	11.4	+3.1
Socialist Alliance	Malcolm Jones	858	2.5	N/A
Majority		17,750	50.9	−7.0
Turnout		34,856	50.9	−15.9
Labour hold		Swing		

=== Elections in the 1990s ===
General election 1997: Makerfield
Party	Candidate	Votes	%	±%
Labour	Ian McCartney	33,119	73.6	+12.9
Conservative	Michael Winstanley	6,942	15.4	−11.7
Liberal Democrats	Bruce Hubbard	3,743	8.3	−1.1
Referendum	Andrew Seed	1,210	2.7	N/A
Majority		26,177	57.9	+24.6
Turnout		45,014	66.8	−9.3
Labour hold		Swing	+12.3	

General election 1992: Makerfield
Party	Candidate	Votes	%	±%
Labour	Ian McCartney	32,832	60.4	+4.1
Conservative	Davina Dickson	14,714	27.1	−0.2
Liberal Democrats	Stephen Jeffers	5,097	9.4	−7.1
Liberal	Stella Cairns	1,309	2.4	N/A
Natural Law	Christopher Davies	397	0.7	N/A
Majority		18,118	33.3	+4.3
Turnout		54,349	76.1	+0.3
Labour hold		Swing	+2.2	

=== Elections in the 1980s ===
General election 1987: Makerfield
Party	Candidate	Votes	%	±%
Labour	Ian McCartney	30,190	56.3	+7.0
Conservative	Laurence Robertson	14,632	27.3	−0.6
Liberal	William Hewer	8,838	16.5	−6.3
Majority		15,558	29.0	+7.6
Turnout		53,660	75.8	+2.1
Labour hold		Swing	+3.8	

General election 1983: Makerfield
Party	Candidate	Votes	%	±%
Labour	Michael McGuire	25,114	49.3	
Conservative	Edward Hay	14,238	27.9	
Liberal	Robin Grayson	11,633	22.8	
Majority		10,876	21.4	
Turnout		50,985	73.7	
Labour win (new seat)				

== See also ==
- Ince parliamentary constituency
- List of parliamentary constituencies in Greater Manchester

== Notes ==
Parliament of the United Kingdom
Preceded by Holborn and St Pancras	Constituency represented by the prime minister 2026 – present	Succeeded by Incumbent
