= Ian McCartney =

British Labour Party politician

The Right Honourable Sir Ian McCartney
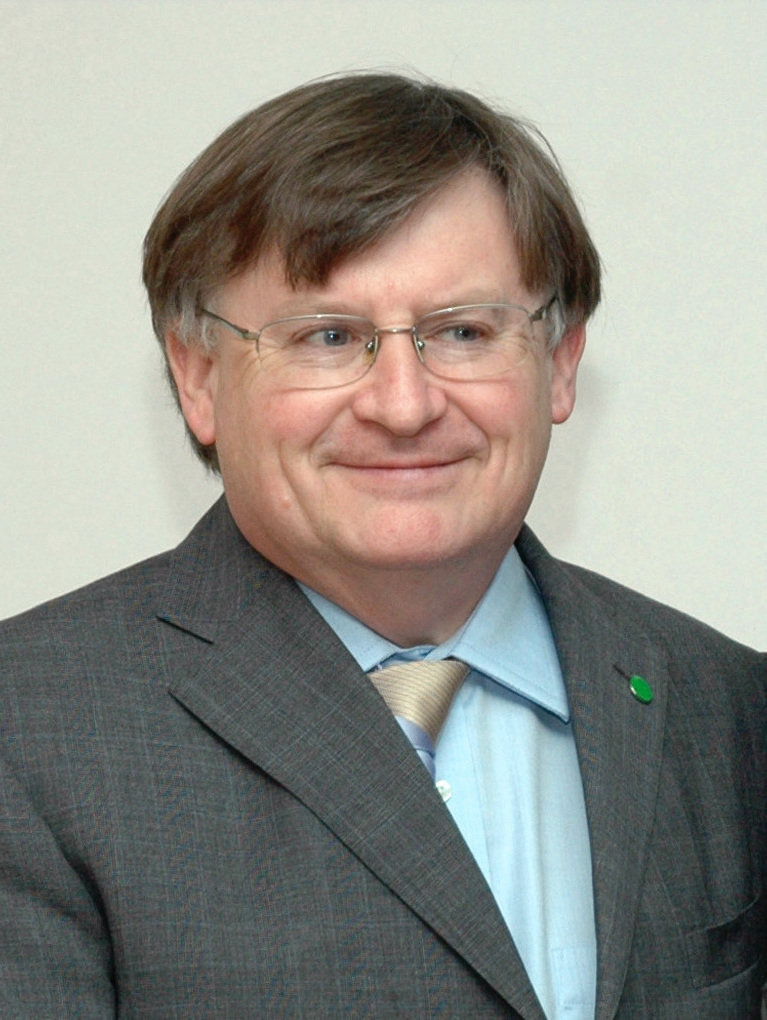
- McCartney in 2006

Minister of State for Trade
- In office 5 May 2006 – 27 June 2007
- Prime Minister: Tony Blair
- Preceded by: Ian Pearson
- Succeeded by: The Lord Jones of Birmingham

Chairman of the Labour Party
- In office 4 April 2003 – 5 May 2006
- Leader: Tony Blair
- Preceded by: John Reid
- Succeeded by: Hazel Blears

Minister without Portfolio
- In office 4 April 2003 – 5 May 2006
- Prime Minister: Tony Blair
- Preceded by: John Reid
- Succeeded by: Hazel Blears

Minister of State for Pensions
- In office 8 June 2001 – 4 April 2003
- Prime Minister: Sir Tony Blair
- Preceded by: Jeff Rooker
- Succeeded by: Malcolm Wicks

Minister of State for the Cabinet Office
- In office 28 July 1999 – 11 June 2001
- Prime Minister: Tony Blair
- Preceded by: Peter Kilfoyle
- Succeeded by: Barbara Roche

Minister of State for Competitiveness
- In office 5 May 1997 – 28 July 1999
- Prime Minister: Tony Blair
- Preceded by: Office established
- Succeeded by: Douglas Alexander (2001)

Member of Parliament for Makerfield
- In office 11June 1987 – 12 April 2010
- Preceded by: Michael McGuire
- Succeeded by: Yvonne Fovargue

Personal details
- Born: 25 April 1951 (age 75) Lennoxtown, Scotland
- Party: Labour
- Website: Ianmccartney.com

Sir Ian McCartney (born 25 April 1951) is a British Labour Party politician who served as Member of Parliament (MP) for Makerfield from 1987 to 2010. McCartney served in Tony Blair's cabinet from 2003 until 2007, when Gordon Brown became Prime Minister. He was made a Knight Bachelor in the 2010 Dissolution Honours List.

== Early life ==
He was born in Lennoxtown, Stirlingshire, to future Labour MP for East Dunbartonshire Hugh McCartney and his wife, Margaret, a trade unionist. McCartney had two sisters, Irene and Margaret.

Educated at Lenzie Academy, he left the school at the age of 15 "under a bit of a cloud" without any qualifications. He led a paper-boys' strike at the age of fifteen, and had a number of jobs after leaving school, including a seaman, a local government manual worker, and a kitchen worker. He was a councillor for Abram ward in Wigan from 1982 to 1987.

== Parliamentary career ==
McCartney became the MP for Makerfield following the 1987 general election. He was one of the founders of the All-Party Parliamentary Rugby League Group the same year, and was its first chairman. He held a number of positions during Labour's period in opposition, and was variously a spokesman on Health, Employment, Education and Social Services. In 1994, he ran John Prescott's successful campaign to become Labour's Deputy Leader. McCartney was one of the shortest MPs, standing five feet, one inch tall. He described himself on his parliamentary notepaper as the "Socialist MP for Makerfield".

On 23 May 2009, McCartney announced he would not stand again at the 2010 general election due to poor health.

=== Ministerial career ===
McCartney was made Minister of State for Competitiveness at the Department of Trade and Industry (DTI) following the 1997 general election when Labour came to power. While at the DTI, he steered the Competition Act 1998 through the House of Commons and introduced a major package of new employment rights which included whistleblowing protection, the National Minimum Wage and the first-ever right to paid holidays. As a former low-paid worker who had been sacked upon asking for a pound pay rise after having a child, McCartney later described the minimum wage as very important to him, saying that he would have "died in the ditch" for it. During this time he was also responsible for employment relations, the Post Office, Company Law and inward investment.

He was moved to be Minister of State at the Cabinet Office in 1999, where he was responsible for modernising Government and E-Government. During this year his drug addict son Hugh McCartney died of a heroin overdose in a Glasgow tenement block. In 2001, McCartney became Minister of State for Pensions at the Department for Work and Pensions, and he was promoted to the Cabinet as Minister Without Portfolio and Party Chairman in April 2003.

Between October 2004 and October 2005, he was Chairman of the Labour Party in two capacities – as the Party Chair (appointed by the party's leader) with a seat in the Cabinet, and as the Chair of the National Executive Committee (elected by the members of the NEC). He was also chair of the party's National Policy Forum, which formulates Labour party policy. The NPF also oversaw the 'Big Conversation' project, which saw the Labour Government try to consult the general public on the future direction of party and government policy. Trusted by both leadership and membership, he was seen as a key link between the Government and the wider Labour movement.

He worked to make the role of Party Chair a voice for Labour Party members within the Labour Government. As architect of the Warwick Agreement by Labour's National Policy Forum, he was a key figure in co-ordinating the election manifesto for Labour's third term general election campaign. In 2006 he took a three-month leave of absence following heart bypass surgery, and publicly told of his fight to lose weight for the sake of his health. His return to frontline politics was marked by his speech to the Labour Party 2006 Spring Conference in Blackpool in which he shed a tear while celebrating 100 years of the Parliamentary Labour Party. He returned to government as Minister of State for Trade in May 2006, attending Cabinet but not voting there, but stepped down in 2007 when Gordon Brown became Prime Minister.

Beginning in October 2007, McCartney worked with the construction, engineering and nuclear energy company Fluor, providing them with advice in anti-corruption and business ethics policies; political, economic, environmental and regulatory issues; and outside relations including working with trade unions. After details of this position were published in The Independent, McCartney stated unequivocally that he personally received none of the remuneration for this role, instead using part of the fee to employ someone in the House of Commons from his Makerfield constituency. The remainder was used to support the Women's Interlink Foundation, a charity based in India which rescues street children and disadvantaged women who are exposed to poverty and sometimes at the risk of rape and murder, providing them with clean drinking water, health treatments, housing and education.

In August 2008, after admitting that some of his claims for furnishing his second home were "inappropriate", McCartney repaid £15,000 of expenses claimed for among other items, a dining table, 18-piece dinner set and champagne glasses. McCartney had asked for the review; although only a portion of the amount was deemed excessive, he said he felt strongly that the full amount should be returned. He commented that as a senior minister he held meetings at home and "had to feed guests".

In May 2009, after stepping down citing health issues, McCartney said his family had urged him to step down following a further bout of illness after his 2005 heart surgery, and that he was also being treated for disc injury and was possibly facing further surgery.

== After Parliament ==
McCartney was chair of Healthwatch Wigan, resigning from the post in 2016.

== Personal life ==
He was married firstly to Jean (née Murray), with whom he had son Hugh and daughters Yvonne and Karen, later divorcing. Hugh died aged 23 of a drugs overdose in 1999 in his flat in Parkhead.

Hugh, known as "Shug", had battled drug addiction since his teenage years. Only recently released from prison, he had been trying to break his habit. In 2002, McCartney gave an interview to the Sunday Herald discussing his son's experiences in the justice system and how McCartney believed "the way we deal with addicts sentenced his son to death". In 2003, McCartney stated in an interview he was still having break downs over the death of his only son.

McCartney's second and current wife is Ann Kevan Parkes, whom he married in 1988.

Parliament of the United Kingdom
Preceded by Michael McGuire	Member of Parliament for Makerfield; 1987–2010	Succeeded by Yvonne Fovargue
Political offices
Preceded by John Reid	Minister without Portfolio; 2003–2006	Succeeded by Hazel Blears
Preceded by Ian Pearson	Minister of State for Trade; 2006–2007	Succeeded by The Lord Jones of Birmingham
Party political offices
Preceded by John Evans	Socialist societies representative on the Labour Party National Executive Committee; 1996–1998	Succeeded by Dianne Hayter
Preceded by John Reid	Chairman of the Labour Party; 2003–2006	Succeeded by Hazel Blears
Preceded by Mary Turner	Chairman of the Labour Party National Executive Committee; 2004–2005	Succeeded by Jeremy Beecham
