= St Matthew's Church, Wigan =

Coordinates: 53.5292°N 2.6725°W

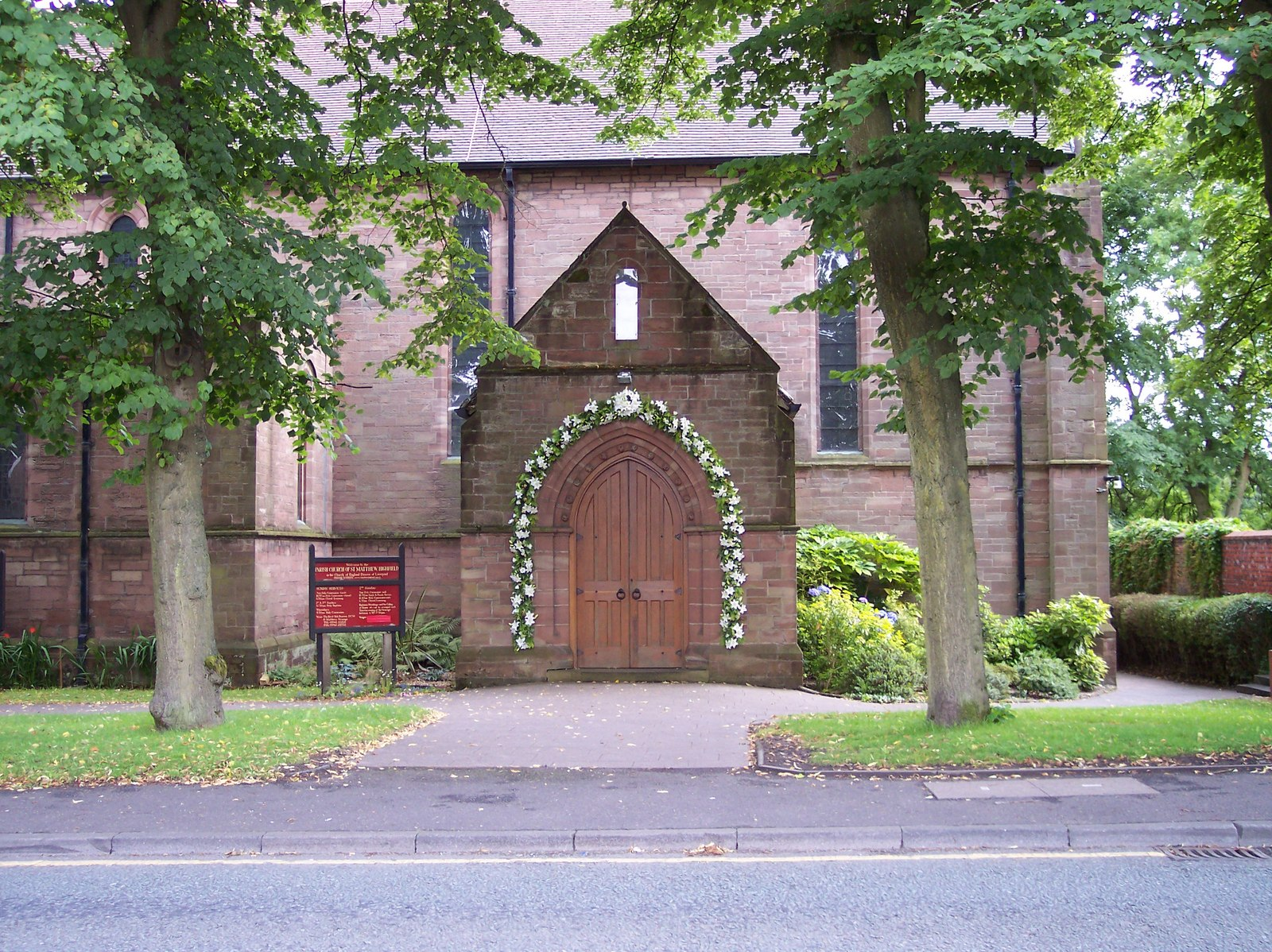

- Location in Greater Manchester
- OS grid reference: SD 555,038
- Location: Billinge Road, Highfield, Wigan, Greater Manchester
- Country: England
- Denomination: Anglican
- Website: St Matthew, Highfield, Wigan

History
- Status: Parish church
- Dedication: Saint Matthew

Architecture
- Functional status: Active
- Heritage designation: Grade II*
- Designated: 11 July 1983
- Architect(s): Paley, Austin and Paley, Austin and Paley
- Architectural type: Church
- Style: Gothic Revival
- Groundbreaking: 1892
- Completed: 1910

Specifications
- Materials: Sandstone, tiled roof

Administration
- Province: York
- Diocese: Liverpool
- Archdeaconry: Wigan and West Lancashire
- Deanery: Wigan
- Parish: Wigan West

Clergy
- Vicar: Revd Fran Humphry

St Matthew's Church is in Billinge Road, Highfield, Pemberton, Wigan, Greater Manchester, England. It is an active Anglican parish church in the deanery of Wigan, the archdeaconry of Wigan & West Lancashire, and the diocese of Liverpool. The church is recorded in the National Heritage List for England as a designated Grade II* listed building.

== History ==
St Matthew's was built between 1892 and 1894, and designed by the Lancaster firm of architects, Paley, Austin and Paley. It was paid for by Colonel Henry Blundell-Hollinshead-Blundell, owner of the Pemberton Colliery, in memory of his wife, Beatrice who had died in 1884. The church cost over £10,000 (equivalent to £1,120,000 as of 2025). The nave and the south aisle were extended to the west in 1909–10 by Austin and Paley. In 1917 a stone reredos, designed by Harry Paley, was installed as a memorial to Colonel Blundell.

== Architecture ==
=== Exterior ===
The church is constructed in Runcorn red sandstone, with a red tiled roof. Its architectural style is Early English. The plan consists of a five-bay nave, a two-bay north aisle, a north porch, a five-bay south aisle, north and south transepts, and a single-bay chancel. Above the crossing is tower with a spire. Around the church are pilasters, and all the windows are lancets. The tower has two unequal stages and a northeast stair turret. Between the stages is a string course, and the upper stage contains two louvred bell openings on each side. The parapet is stepped at the corners, and the tower is surmounted by an octagonal spire with lucarnes.

=== Interior ===
Inside the church are a two-bay north arcade and a five-bay south arcade. The north transept contains a Lady chapel, and in the south transept is the organ loft. On the south side of the chancel is a sedilia. The furnishings were designed by the architects, including the reredos of 1917, the font, and the pulpit. The stained glass in the east window (from 1917), and in the north aisle and transept (from the 1920s) is by Hardmans. Also in the church are three windows designed by Harold Harvey, dating between 1976 and 1992.

== See also ==
- Grade II* listed buildings in Greater Manchester
- Listed buildings in Wigan
- List of works by Paley, Austin and Paley
