= Stephen Walsh (politician) =

British trade union official and politician

The Right Honourable Stephen Walsh
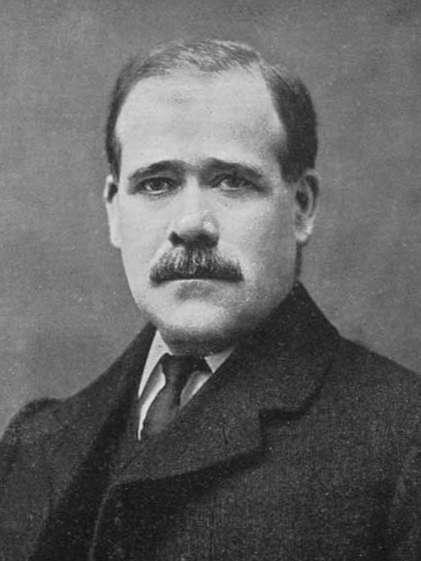

Secretary of State for War
- In office 22 January 1924 – 3 November 1924
- Prime Minister: Ramsay MacDonald
- Preceded by: The Earl of Derby
- Succeeded by: Sir Laming Worthington-Evans, Bt

Deputy Leader of the Labour Party
- In office 14 February 1921 – 21 November 1922
- Leader: J. R. Clynes
- Preceded by: J. R. Clynes
- Succeeded by: J. R. Clynes

Parliamentary Secretary to the Local Government Board
- In office 28 June 1917 – 27 January 1919
- Prime Minister: David Lloyd George
- Preceded by: Hayes Fisher
- Succeeded by: Waldorf Astor

Parliamentary Secretary to the Ministry of National Service
- In office 17 March 1917 – 28 June 1917
- Prime Minister: David Lloyd George
- Preceded by: Office Established
- Succeeded by: Cecil Beck

Member of Parliament for Ince
- In office 12 January 1906 – 16 March 1929
- Preceded by: Henry Blundell-Hollinshead-Blundell
- Succeeded by: Gordon Macdonald

Personal details
- Born: 26 August 1859 Liverpool, Merseyside, UK
- Died: 16 March 1929 (aged 69)
- Party: Labour
- Other political affiliations: Coalition Labour
- Occupation: Miner

Stephen Walsh (26 August 1859 – 16 March 1929) was a British miner, trade unionist and Labour Party politician.

== Background ==
Born in Liverpool, Walsh became an orphan at a very young age. He was educated at an industrial school in the Kirkdale area of the city, leaving school aged 13 to work in a coalmine in Ashton in Makerfield.

== Political career ==
Walsh was an official of the Lancashire and Cheshire Miners' Federation before he was elected to parliament for Ince in the 1906 general election. Later that year he attacked the idea that an MP needed an Oxbridge education further adding that: "To use an arithmetical metaphor, the Labour party had reduced the points of difference among the working classes to the lowest common denominator, and had promoted and developed the greatest common measure of united action".

Walsh was a member of David Lloyd George's Coalition Government as Parliamentary Secretary to the Ministry of National Service in 1917 and as Parliamentary Secretary to the Local Government Board from 1917 to 1919.

Walsh stood in the 1918 election as a Coalition Labour candidate opposed by the official Labour Party. He was vice-president of National Union of Mineworkers from 1922 to 1924 until he was appointed Secretary of State for War by Ramsay MacDonald in January 1924, a post he held until the government fell in November of the same year. He was sworn of the Privy Council in January 1924.

== Family ==
One of Walsh's sons died in World War I. Walsh himself died in March 1929, aged 69.

Trade union offices
Preceded by Herbert Smith	Vice-President of the Miners' Federation of Great Britain; 1922–1924	Succeeded by Thomas Richards
Parliament of the United Kingdom
Preceded by Henry Blundell-Hollinshead-Blundell	Member of Parliament for Ince; 1906–1929	Succeeded by Gordon MacDonald
Political offices
Preceded by New office	Parliamentary Secretary to the Ministry of National Service; 1917	Succeeded by Cecil Beck
Preceded by William Hayes Fisher	Parliamentary Secretary to the Local Government Board; 1917–1919	Succeeded by Hon. Waldorf Astor
Preceded by The Earl of Derby	Secretary of State for War; 1924	Succeeded by Sir Laming Worthington-Evans, Bt
