= Ince (constituency) =

Parliamentary constituency in the United Kingdom, 1885–1983

- Former county constituency for the House of Commons
- County: Lancashire
- Major settlements: Ince-in-Makerfield, Abram

1885–1974
- Created from: South West Lancashire

1974–1983
- Type of constituency: Borough constituency
- Replaced by: Makerfield, West Lancashire, St Helens North and Wigan

Ince was a parliamentary constituency in England which elected one Member of Parliament (MP) to the House of Commons of the Parliament of the United Kingdom. It comprised the town of Ince-in-Makerfield and other towns south of Wigan.

It was created by the Redistribution of Seats Act 1885 as a division of the parliamentary county of Lancashire. The constituency boundaries were redrawn in 1918 and 1950, and in 1974, it was reclassified as a borough constituency.

The constituency ceased to exist with the implementation of the 1983 boundary changes and was largely replaced by the Makerfield Parliamentary constituency.

== Boundaries ==
Ince in Lancashire, boundaries used 1974–1983

=== 1885–1918 ===
The constituency, officially designated as South-West Lancashire, Ince Division consisted of parishes south of, but not including, the town of Wigan, namely:

- Abram
- Haigh
- Hindley
- Ince-in-Makerfield
- Orrell
- Pemberton

The electorate also included the freeholders of the municipal borough of Wigan who were entitled to vote in the county.

=== 1918–1950 ===
The Representation of the People Act 1918 reorganised constituencies throughout the United Kingdom. Boundaries were adjusted and seats were defined in terms of the districts created by the Local Government Act 1894. According to the schedules of the Act, the Lancashire, Ince Division comprised:

- Abram Urban District
- Ashton in Makerfield Urban District
- Billinge Urban District
- Ince-in-Makerfield Urban District
- Orrell Urban District
- Standish with Langtree Urban District
- The civil parish of Shevington from Wigan Rural District

=== 1950–1983 ===
The Representation of the People Act 1948 redistributed parliamentary seats, with the constituencies first being used in the general election of 1950. The term "county constituency" was introduced in place of "division". Ince County Constituency was redefined as consisting of seven urban districts:

- Abram
- Ashton in Makerfield
- Billinge & Winstanley
- Ince-in-Makerfield
- Orrell
- Skelmersdale
- Upholland

The changes reflected local government boundary changes that had taken place, and the renaming of Billinge UD as "Billinge and Winstanley" in 1924. Standish with Langtree and Shevington were transferred to the Westhoughton county constituency. Skelmersdale and Upholland had previously formed part of the Ormskirk division.

The Parliamentary Constituencies (England) Order 1970 altered the seat's name to Ince Borough Constituency. The constituency was defined as consisting of six urban districts: Abram, Ashton in Makerfield, Billinge & Winstanley, Ince-in-Makerfield, Orrell, and Skelmersdale & Holland. Skelmersdale and Upholland urban districts had been amalgamated in 1968, and the 1970 boundaries were the same as those of 1950.

== Abolition ==
The constituency was abolished by the Parliamentary Constituencies (England) Order 1983, which redrew constituencies based on the new counties and districts created in 1974. Most of the area (Abram, Orrell and Winstanley) was included in the Makerfield County Constituency, in the parliamentary county of Greater Manchester. Ashton in Makerfield and Billinge was divided between Makerfield constituency, in Greater Manchester, and St Helens North Borough Constituency in Merseyside; Skelmersdale & Upholland formed part of West Lancashire County Constituency.

== Members of Parliament ==
Election	Member	Party
1885	Henry Blundell-Hollinshead-Blundell	Conservative
1892	Samuel Woods	Lib-Lab
1895	Henry Blundell-Hollinshead-Blundell	Conservative
1906	Stephen Walsh	Labour
1929	Gordon Macdonald	Labour
1942 by-election	Tom Brown	Labour
1964	Michael McGuire	Labour
1983	constituency abolished	

== Election results ==
=== Elections in the 1880s ===
General election Nov 1885: Ince
Party	Candidate	Votes	%	±%
Conservative	Henry Blundell-Hollinshead-Blundell	4,271	53.4	
Liberal	Cornelius McLeod Percy	3,725	46.6	
Majority		546	6.8	
Turnout		7,996	87.3	
Registered electors		9,157		
Conservative win (new seat)				

General election Jul 1886: Ince
Party	Candidate	Votes	%	±%
Conservative	Henry Blundell-Hollinshead-Blundell	4,308	57.2	+3.8
Liberal	George Paul Taylor	3,228	42.8	−3.8
Majority		1,080	14.4	+7.6
Turnout		7,536	82.3	−5.0
Registered electors		9,157		
Conservative hold		Swing	+3.8	

=== Elections in the 1890s ===
General election Jul 1892: Ince
Party	Candidate	Votes	%	±%
Lib-Lab	Sam Woods	4,579	51.3	+8.5
Conservative	Henry Blundell-Hollinshead-Blundell	4,352	48.7	−8.5
Majority		227	2.6	N/A
Turnout		8,931	88.8	+6.5
Registered electors		10,059		
Lib-Lab gain from Conservative		Swing	+8.5	

General election Jul 1895: Ince
Party	Candidate	Votes	%	±%
Conservative	Henry Blundell-Hollinshead-Blundell	5,235	52.2	+3.5
Lib-Lab	Sam Woods	4,790	47.8	−3.5
Majority		445	4.4	N/A
Turnout		10,025	91.7	+2.9
Registered electors		10,935		
Conservative gain from Lib-Lab		Swing	+3.5	

=== Elections in the 1900s ===
General election Sep 1900: Ince
Party	Candidate	Votes	%	±%
Conservative	Henry Blundell-Hollinshead-Blundell	Unopposed		
Conservative hold				

General election Jan 1906: Ince
Party	Candidate	Votes	%	±%
Labour Repr. Cmte.	Stephen Walsh	8,046	70.2	New
Conservative	Henry Blundell-Hollinshead-Blundell	3,410	29.8	N/A
Majority		4,636	40.4	N/A
Turnout		11,456	88.2	N/A
Registered electors		12,986		
Labour Repr. Cmte. gain from Conservative		Swing	N/A	

=== Elections in the 1910s ===
General election January 1910: Ince
Party	Candidate	Votes	%	±%
Labour	Stephen Walsh	7,723	60.6	−9.6
Conservative	Walter Greaves-Lord	5,029	39.4	+9.6
Majority		2,694	21.2	−19.2
Turnout		12,752	90.4	+2.2
Registered electors		14,107		
Labour hold		Swing	−9.6	

General election December 1910: Ince
Party	Candidate	Votes	%	±%
Labour	Stephen Walsh	7,117	57.2	−3.4
Conservative	Walter Greaves-Lord	5,332	42.8	+3.4
Majority		1,785	14.4	−6.8
Turnout		12,449	88.2	−2.2
Registered electors		14,107		
Labour hold		Swing	−3.4	

General election 1918: Ince
Party	Candidate	Votes	%	±%
Labour	Stephen Walsh	14,882	87.0	+29.8
Socialist Labour	William Paul	2,231	13.0	New
Majority		12,651	74.0	+59.6
Turnout		17,113	55.7	−32.5
Registered electors		30,736		
Labour hold		Swing	N/A	

=== Elections in the 1920s ===
General election 1922: Ince
Party	Candidate	Votes	%	±%
Labour	Stephen Walsh	17,332	67.7	−19.3
Unionist	E.L. Fleming	8,257	32.3	New
Majority		9,075	35.4	−38.6
Turnout		25,589	80.0	+24.3
Registered electors		31,974		
Labour hold		Swing	N/A	

General election 1923: Ince
Party	Candidate	Votes	%	±%
Labour	Stephen Walsh	17,365	73.5	+5.8
Unionist	Rachel Parsons	6,262	26.5	−5.8
Majority		11,103	47.0	+11.6
Turnout		23,627	72.2	−7.8
Registered electors		32,710		
Labour hold		Swing	+5.8	

General election 1924: Ince
Party	Candidate	Votes	%	±%
Labour	Stephen Walsh	18,272	70.0	−3.5
Unionist	E.V. Gabriel	7,820	30.0	+3.5
Majority		10,452	40.0	−7.0
Turnout		26,092	78.5	+6.3
Registered electors		33,235		
Labour hold		Swing	−3.5	

General election 1929: Ince
Party	Candidate	Votes	%	±%
Labour	Gordon Macdonald	26,091	73.8	+3.8
Unionist	John Bankes Walmsley	9,260	26.2	−3.8
Majority		16,831	47.6	+7.6
Turnout		35,351	82.2	+3.7
Registered electors		43,026		
Labour hold		Swing	+3.8	

=== Elections in the 1930s ===
General election 1931: Ince
Party	Candidate	Votes	%	±%
Labour	Gordon Macdonald	23,237	63.4	−10.4
Conservative	R Catterall	13,440	36.6	+10.4
Majority		9,797	26.7	−20.9
Turnout		36,677	82.5	+0.3
Labour hold		Swing		

General election 1935: Ince
Party	Candidate	Votes	%	±%
Labour	Gordon Macdonald	26,334	72.6	+9.2
Conservative	Herbert F. Ryan	9,928	27.4	−9.2
Majority		16,406	45.2	+18.5
Turnout		36,262	77.3	−5.2
Labour hold		Swing		

=== Elections in the 1940s ===
General election 1945: Ince
Party	Candidate	Votes	%	±%
Labour	Tom Brown	28,702	74.4	+1.8
Conservative	Robert Cecil	9,875	25.6	−1.8
Majority		18,827	48.8	+3.6
Turnout		38,577	79.0	+1.7
Labour hold		Swing		

=== Elections in the 1950s ===
General election 1950: Ince
Party	Candidate	Votes	%	±%
Labour	Tom Brown	32,145	71.8	−2.6
Conservative	JG Scott	12,612	28.2	+2.6
Majority		19,533	43.6	−5.2
Turnout		44,757	88.7	+9.7
Labour hold		Swing		

General election 1951: Ince
Party	Candidate	Votes	%	±%
Labour	Tom Brown	32,148	72.3	+0.5
Conservative	James Porter	12,305	27.7	−0.5
Majority		19,843	44.6	+1.0
Turnout		44,453	87.0	−1.7
Labour hold		Swing		

General election 1955: Ince
Party	Candidate	Votes	%	±%
Labour	Tom Brown	29,830	72.7	+0.4
Conservative	Geoffrey Beaman	11,183	27.3	−0.4
Majority		18,647	45.4	+0.8
Turnout		41,013	81.0	−6.0
Labour hold		Swing		

General election 1959: Ince
Party	Candidate	Votes	%	±%
Labour	Tom Brown	30,752	72.3	−0.4
Conservative	Walter Clegg	11,795	27.7	+0.4
Majority		18,957	44.6	−0.8
Turnout		42,547	83.0	+2.0
Labour hold		Swing		

=== Elections in the 1960s ===
General election 1964: Ince
Party	Candidate	Votes	%	±%
Labour	Michael McGuire	31,042	72.0	−0.3
Conservative	Francis Henry Gerard Heron Goodhart	12,077	28.0	+0.3
Majority		18,965	44.0	−0.6
Turnout		43,119	79.6	−3.4
Labour hold		Swing		

General election 1966: Ince
Party	Candidate	Votes	%	±%
Labour	Michael McGuire	30,915	73.6	+1.6
Conservative	John Birch	11,075	26.4	−1.6
Majority		19,840	47.2	+3.2
Turnout		41,990	75.4	−4.2
Labour hold		Swing		

=== Elections in the 1970s ===
General election 1970: Ince
Party	Candidate	Votes	%	±%
Labour	Michael McGuire	32,295	68.5	−5.1
Conservative	Allan Coupe	14,877	31.5	+5.1
Majority		17,418	37.0	−10.2
Turnout		47,172	70.7	−4.7
Labour hold		Swing		

General election February 1974: Ince
Party	Candidate	Votes	%	±%
Labour	Michael McGuire	39,822	70.0	+1.5
Conservative	John Richard Dyson	17,063	30.0	−1.5
Majority		22,759	40.0	+3.0
Turnout		56,885	74.4	+3.7
Labour hold		Swing		

General election October 1974: Ince
Party	Candidate	Votes	%	±%
Labour	Michael McGuire	35,453	63.5	−6.5
Conservative	John Richard Dyson	11,923	21.4	−8.6
Liberal	John Kenneth Gibb	8,436	15.1	New
Majority		23,530	42.1	+2.1
Turnout		55,812	72.4	−2.0
Labour hold		Swing		

General election 1979: Ince
Party	Candidate	Votes	%	±%
Labour	Michael McGuire	34,599	56.2	−7.3
Conservative	Peter Brown	20,263	32.9	+11.5
Liberal	John Kenneth Gibb	6,294	10.2	−4.9
Workers Revolutionary	John Simons	442	0.7	New
Majority		14,336	23.3	−18.8
Turnout		61,598	74.2	+1.8
Labour hold		Swing		

== See also ==
- Makerfield parliamentary constituency

== Sources ==
- Leigh Rayment's Historical List of MPs – Constituencies beginning with "I"
- Election results, 1950–1979
