= Yvonne Fovargue =

British Labour politician (born 1956)

Yvonne Fovargue CBE
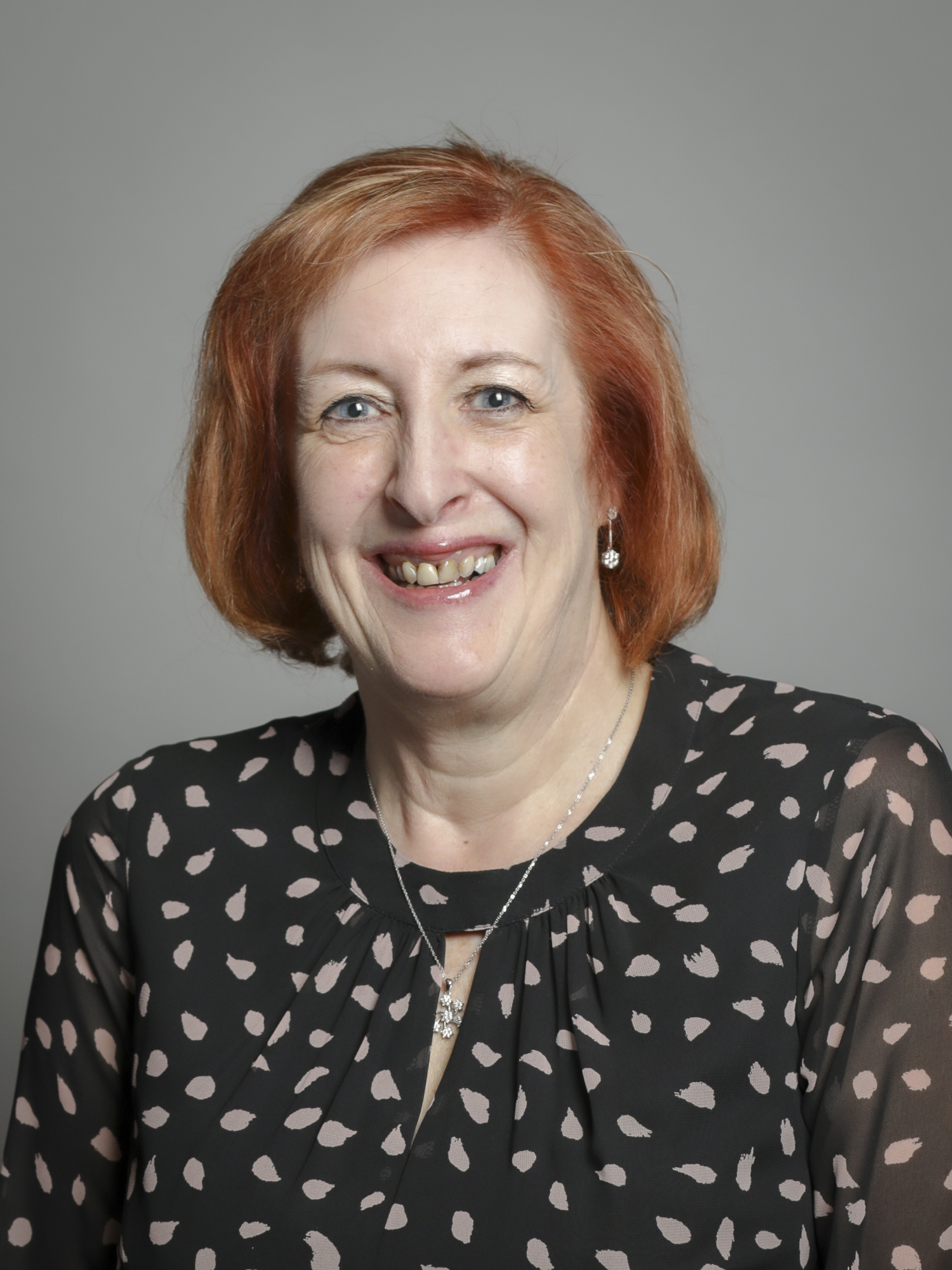
- Official portrait, 2020

Member of Parliament for Makerfield
- In office 6 May 2010 – 30 May 2024
- Preceded by: Ian McCartney
- Succeeded by: Josh Simons

Member of Warrington Borough Council for Fairfield and Howley
- In office 10 June 2004 – 6 May 2010

Personal details
- Born: Yvonne Helen Fovargue; 29 November 1956 (age 69) Sale, Cheshire, England
- Party: Labour
- Spouse: Paul Kenny (m. 2009)
- Education: University of Leeds (BA)

Yvonne Helen Fovargue (born 29 November 1956) is a British Labour Party politician who served as Member of Parliament (MP) for Makerfield from 2010 to 2024.

== Early life and career ==
Yvonne Helen Fovargue was born on 29 November 1956 in Sale, Cheshire. She was educated at Sale Grammar School and obtained a Bachelor of Arts in English from the University of Leeds. Fovargue has been a member of Mensa.

In the 1980s, she worked as a housing officer for Manchester City Council. Fovargue was later chief executive of the Citizens Advice Bureau in St Helens, Merseyside for over 20 years.

Fovargue was elected to Warrington Borough Council at the 2004 local elections, representing Fairfield and Howley ward. She was re-elected in 2007 but resigned ahead of the 2010 general election.

== Parliamentary career ==
Fovargue was elected as Member of Parliament (MP) for Makerfield at the 2010 general election, then considered to be a safe Labour constituency. She has been a member of the Unite the Union and the Co-operative Party.

Under the leadership Ed Miliband, Fovargue was appointed to the opposition front bench as a whip in October 2011. She was promoted to serve as a Shadow Transport Minister from January until October 2013, when she was appointed to shadow the Minister for International Security Strategy.

Fovargue changed roles again upon her appointment as Shadow Further Education and Skills Minister in October 2014. She briefly returned as a Shadow Defence Minister under Harriet Harman's interim leadership from May to September 2015.

In September 2015, she was appointed by Labour leader Jeremy Corbyn as Shadow Consumer Affairs and Science Minister. Fovargue resigned from the front bench in June 2016 to protest Corbyn's leadership, and supported Owen Smith in the subsequent leadership election.

She rejoined the front bench in October 2016, following Corbyn's re-election, as Shadow Local Government Minister. However, she resigned again in March 2019 after defying the Party whip to voting against a motion proposing second EU referendum. In the 2020 Labour leadership election, she supported neighbouring MP Lisa Nandy.

In 2022, Fovargue was appointed as the Prime Minister's Trade Envoy to Libya and Tunisia. She was appointed as a Commander of the Order of the British Empire (CBE) for 'political and public service' in the 2024 New Year Honours.

Following the announcement of the 2024 general election, Fovargue announced that she would not be seeking re-election to Parliament.

== Personal life ==
Fovargue married Paul Kenny in 2009. Kenny served alongside Fovargue on Warrington Borough Council, and he was later elected to represent a Wigan Metropolitan Borough Council ward in her Parliamentary constituency. She employed her husband as a Parliamentary assistant.

Parliament of the United Kingdom
Preceded by Ian McCartney	Member of Parliament for Makerfield; 2010–2024	Succeeded by Josh Simons
