= Michael McGuire (politician) =

British politician (1926–2018)

Michael Thomas Francis McGuire (3 May 1926 – 16 August 2018) was a British Labour Party politician.

McGuire was born in Carrowmore, County Mayo, Ireland in May 1926. He was the National Union of Mineworkers full-time branch secretary at Sutton Manor Colliery, St Helens, in 1957-64, and he was also secretary of St Helens Trades and Labour Council in 1957-64.

He was elected Member of Parliament for Ince from 1964 to 1983, and Makerfield from 1983. He was deselected by his constituency party in 1985, largely because of his failure to support the miners' strike of 1984 to 1985, and he left parliament at the next general election in 1987.

In 1954 he married Marie T. Murphy (died 1998), with whom he had three sons and two daughters. He died in Aintree University Hospital in August 2018 at the age of 92.

Parliament of the United Kingdom
Preceded by Tom Brown	Member of Parliament for Ince; 1964–1983	Constituency abolished
New constituency	Member of Parliament for Makerfield; 1983–1987	Succeeded by Ian McCartney
