= Helen Thompson (political economist) =

British political economist

- Title: Professor

Academic work
- Discipline: Political Sciences
- Institutions: University of Cambridge
- Website: Professor Helen Thompson

Helen Thompson is an English academic who teaches politics at Cambridge University, where she is a professor of political economy and a fellow of Clare College, Cambridge.

She has been working in Cambridge since 1994 and is currently a member of the Department of Politics and International Studies. One of her research interests has been the 2008 financial crisis.

Her current research interests are the political economy of energy and the history of the democratic, economic, and geopolitical disruptions of the current century.

She has co-hosted the Talking Politics podcast with David Runciman and the UnHerd podcast These Times.

In 2024, the New Statesman named Thompson 48th in The Left Power List 2024, the magazine's "guide to the 50 most influential people in progressive politics".

== Selected works ==
- — (Spring 1999). "The Modern State, Political Choice and An Open International Economy". Government and Opposition. 32 (2). Cambridge University Press: 203–225. doi:10.1111/j.1477-7053.1999.tb00478.x. eISSN 1477-7053. ISSN 0017-257X. JSTOR 44482823. LCCN 65009983. OCLC 904489489. S2CID 143614074.
- — (18 May 2017). Oil and the Western Economic Crisis. Palgrave Macmillan. doi:10.1007/978-3-319-52509-9. ISBN 978-3-319-52509-9. LCCN 2019744263. OCLC 987826447. OL 28330723M.
- — (8 June 2017). "Inevitability and contingency: The political economy of Brexit". The British Journal of Politics and International Relations. 19 (3): 434–449. doi:10.1177/1369148117710431. eISSN 1467-856X. ISSN 1369-1481. LCCN sn99033216. OCLC 49056411. S2CID 157939675.
- — (24 March 2022). Disorder: Hard Times in the 21st Century. Oxford University Press. ISBN 978-0198864981. LCCN 2021951494. OCLC 1260819550. OL 33958421M.
