= Gordon Macdonald, 1st Baron Macdonald of Gwaenysgor =

British politician, last British governor of Newfoundland

The Right Honourable The Lord Macdonald of Gwaenysgor KCMG PC
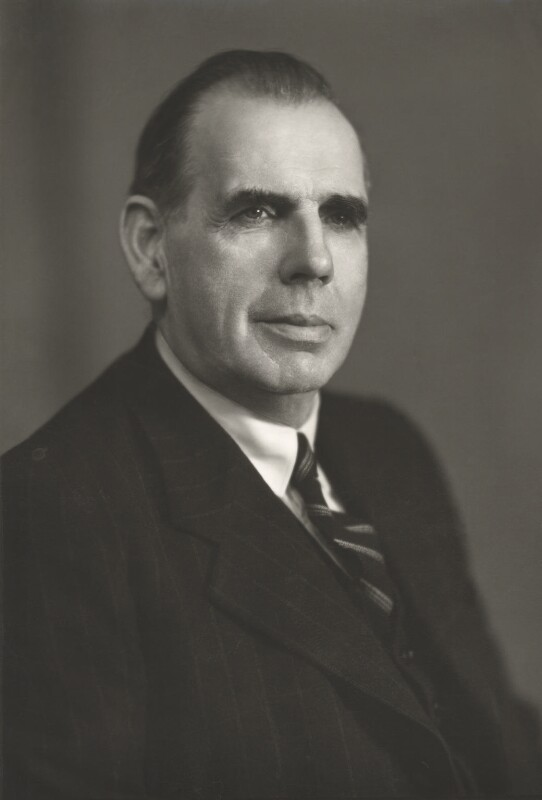
- Macdonald in 1948

68th Governor of Newfoundland
- In office 1946–1949
- Preceded by: Sir Humphrey Walwyn
- Succeeded by: Sir Albert Walsh (as Lt. Governor)

Personal details
- Born: May 27, 1888 Gwaenysgor, Wales
- Died: January 20, 1966 (aged 77)
- Party: Labour

Viceregal styles of The Lord Macdonald of Gwaenysgor
- Reference style: His Excellency
- Spoken style: Your Excellency

Gordon Macdonald, 1st Baron Macdonald of Gwaenysgor KCMG PC (27 May 1888 – 20 January 1966), was a British Labour Party politician and Newfoundland's final British governor as well as the last chairman of the Commission of Government serving from 1946 until the dominion joined Confederation in 1949 and became a province of Canada.

== Early life ==
Macdonald was born in Gwaenysgor, near Prestatyn, Flintshire, Wales. His birth was registered (as Gordon McDonald) in Holywell in the third quarter of 1888. His father, Thomas Macdonald, and his mother, Ellen, were both Welsh. The family moved to the Lancashire Coalfield where he was brought up, his father working as a coalminer in a pit near Ashton in Makerfield. Educated in a local elementary school, he initially followed his father into the collieries aged 13. He subsequently won a scholarship to Ruskin College.

In 1920 he was elected to Wigan Board of Guardians, in 1924 became president of a local co-operative society and in the same year a miner's agent for the Miners' Federation of Great Britain.

== Member of Parliament ==
At the 1929 general election Macdonald was elected Member of Parliament (MP) for Ince, holding the seat until 1942. He was a junior Labour whip from 1931 to 1934 and was chairman of committees in the House of Commons. He resigned from Parliament in July 1942 to take up the post of Regional Controller for the Ministry of Fuel and Power for the Lancashire, Cheshire, and North Wales Region.

== Governor of Newfoundland ==
In January 1946 he was appointed Governor of Newfoundland and Commander in Chief of Newfoundland and its Dependencies, and chairman of the unelected Commission of Government that governed the dominion. At the same time he was created Knight Commander of the Order of St Michael and St George. He oversaw the election of the Newfoundland National Convention in 1946, and the holding of two referendums in 1948, which led to Newfoundland becoming a province of Canada in March 1949.

Macdonald was viewed as being pro-federation and was accused of bias by Peter Cashin and supporters of responsible government and of manipulating the referendums.

Macdonald left the island upon its entry to Canada in 1949. Two days after his departure, an apparently congratulatory poem was published in The Evening Telegram. It emerged that the poem was an acrostic, with the first letter of each line spelling out "THE BASTARD".

== Paymaster-General ==
On return to the United Kingdom in 1949, Macdonald joined the government of Clement Attlee as Paymaster General, elevated to the House of Lords as Baron Macdonald of Gwaenysgor. In 1950 he was leader of the British delegation to the Commonwealth Conference on Economic Aid to Countries of South East Asia held in Sydney, Australia and was a delegate to United Nations General Assembly at Lake Success, New York. He was appointed a Privy Counsellor in 1951. He held office until Labour lost power at the 1951 general election.

== Later life ==
Macdonald continued to be active in public life.

A fluent Welsh speaker, from 1952 to 1960 he was National Governor for Wales of the British Broadcasting Corporation, and from 1953 until his death was chairman of the Broadcasting Council for Wales. From 1952 to 1959 he was a member of the Colonial Development Corporation.

A Congregationalist in religion, he was National President of the Band of Hope Union of Great Britain in 1951. He held two honorary doctorates in law from Mount Allison University, Sackville, New Brunswick and the University of Wales.

== Family ==
In 1913 he married Mary Lewis of Blaenau Ffestiniog. The couple had two sons and one daughter.

He died in January 1966, aged 77. His eldest son, Gordon Ramsay MacDonald, succeeded him in the barony.

== See also ==
- List of people from Newfoundland and Labrador

Parliament of the United Kingdom
Preceded by Stephen Walsh	Member of Parliament for Ince; 1929–1942	Succeeded by Tom Brown
Government offices
Preceded by Humphrey T. Walwyn	Commission Governor of Newfoundland; 1946–1949	Succeeded by Albert Walsh as Lieutenant Governor of Newfoundland
Preceded by Humphrey T. Walwyn	Commission Governor of Newfoundland; 1946–1949	Succeeded by Joey Smallwood as Premier of Newfoundland
Political offices
Preceded by The Viscount Addison	Paymaster General; 1949–1951	Succeeded by The Lord Cherwell
Peerage of the United Kingdom
New creation	Baron Macdonald of Gwaenysgor; 1949–1966	Succeeded by Gordon Macdonald
