= Noah Ablett =

Welsh trade unionist and political theorist

- Born: 4 October 1883; Ynyshir, Rhondda, Wales
- Died: 31 October 1935 (aged 52); Merthyr Tydfil, Wales
- Education: Ruskin College, Oxford
- Occupations: coal miner, trade unionist, political theorist, educator
- Organisation: South Wales Miners' Federation Miners' Federation of Great Britain Plebs' League Central Labour College
- Known for: Co-author of The Miners' Next Step; Founding member of Plebs' League
- Spouse: Annie Howells (m. 1912)
- Children: Beatrice Ablett; Watkin Ablett
- Parents: John Ablett (father); Jane Ablett (mother)

Noah Ablett (4 October 1883 – 31 October 1935) was a Welsh trade unionist and political theorist. He contributed to The Miners' Next Step, a syndicalist treatise which Ablett described as "scientific trade unionism". Through the Plebs' League he helped establish Marxist educational programmes for miners in the Rhondda valleys.

== Early life and education ==
Ablett was born on 4 October 1883 at Ynyshir in the Rhondda Fach in South Wales to John Ablett and his wife Jane (née Williams); he was the tenth child of eleven. After attending Ferndale Higher Grade School, he began work at the Standard Colliery in Ynyshir at age 12 in 1895. Originally intending to join the ministry, Ablett was a lay preacher with the Baptists during the 1904–1905 Welsh revival.

Ablett suffered a serious work accident when a four-ton piece of coal landed on his leg, causing compound fractures, and also broke two fingers on his hand. He had been studying for Civil service entrance examination as a means of escaping underground work. However, the accident left him with a lasting disability and the civil service did not employ people with physical disabilities at the time. Ablett recalled:

The doctor advised me not to go to college. I had a compound fracture of the leg ... two broken fingers and a small growth in the nostrils, and this he assured me would prevent me being allowed to enter the civil service ... I felt like a trapped animal.

He remained in the coal mines and later described the miner's working conditions:

The hewer down in the mine, away from the sunlight and fresh air, sometimes in a temperature of up to 90 °F, every movement of the day inhaling coal and shale dust ... subject at any moment to the terrible list of mining diseases ... liable always to wounds and death from falls of roof ... such a man is entitled to our sympathy and respect, but what he frequently gets is abuse.

Another turning point came when Ablett discovered that his father was to face a reduction in wages, which Ablett believed was punishment for his union activities. He "immediately rushed back to the pit, and on my own initiative posted up notices that a meeting at the pit top was to be held". The wage reduction was later cancelled, but the incident led Ablett to study the works of Robert Blatchford and Karl Marx, becoming a convinced socialist. At age 16, Ablett participated in the 1898 South Wales miners' strike, which led to the workers' defeat through a six-month lockout. Following this lockout, the miners formed the South Wales Miners' Federation. The strike and formation of the Federation had a major influence on Ablett's political attitudes.

Ablett became concerned with the poor pay and working conditions of the Rhondda coal miners and joined the Independent Labour Party. A keen learner, he won a scholarship to Ruskin College, Oxford in 1907. Ablett was dissatisfied with the education he received at Ruskin, feeling that the college's connection to Oxford University was an example of the establishment attempting to control working-class knowledge and opinion. He organised alternative lectures on Marxist economics and history for his fellow students to promote different ideas from the college's more traditional offerings. While at Ruskin, Ablett was significantly influenced by the ideas of American socialist writer Daniel De Leon, whose theories on industrial unionism and workers' control would later shape Ablett's syndicalist philosophy. In March 1909, when the college authorities dismissed Principal Dennis Hird for supporting student Marxist activities, Ablett organised a student strike in protest.

On returning to the valleys Ablett established Marxist educational classes and took part in campaigns for a minimum wage.

== Syndicalist activism ==
On his return to South Wales in 1909, Ablett became a checkweighman at Mardy Colliery in Maerdy and the following year was one of the founders of the Unofficial Reform Committee. Ablett took part in the Cambrian Combine strike of 1910–11, a dispute that involved over 30,000 miners and which led to the Tonypandy riots.

In 1912 Ablett married Annie Howells, with whom he had one son (Watkin) and a daughter (Beatrice). During 1912 he also co-authored The Miners' Next Step, a pamphlet demanding a minimum wage for miners and advocating for workers' control of the mines. The pamphlet opposed nationalisation of the coal mines, instead favouring direct worker control of mining operations.

In November 1912, Ablett debated W. F. Hay at Trealaw on the question of political versus industrial action, asking his audience: "Are we willing to let ignorance in Whitehall sit in judgement on knowledge in the Rhondda, to let the man who does not know govern the men who do?"

The outbreak of the First World War in 1914 posed a challenge to Ablett's syndicalist convictions. Having been brought up to believe that the only war worth fighting was the class war, he watched as thousands of Welsh miners enlisted. The Central Labour College closed for the duration and did not reopen until 1919, when Ablett himself was given the honour of reopening it. Between 1914 and 1919 Ablett's oratory drew large audiences and he influenced events including the South Wales miners' strike of 1915.

By 1919 Ablett was an executive of the South Wales Miners' Federation and was chairman of the board of governors of the Central Labour College, where he had served on the board of management representing the Rhondda district from 1911 to 1915. He also represented South Wales miners at the Leeds Convention of 1917, which expressed solidarity with the Russian Revolution. Although Ablett described himself as a "convinced communist", he never joined the Communist Party of Great Britain. At heart he remained a syndicalist, believing that socialism should be achieved through workers' control of industry rather than through the state, and warning of "the horror of bureaucracy co-mingled with the desire to govern as much as possible the conditions under which one has to live".

This scepticism towards state power also set Ablett at odds with the Labour Party, whose commitment to harnessing the resources of the state was enshrined in Clause IV of its constitution. In 1919 Ablett was approached by the Labour Party to contest the Pembrokeshire constituency ahead of the 1922 general election. Ablett turned down the invitation, explaining that "my belief in the efficacy of the industrial movement of Labour far exceeds my hopes of the rapid success of Labour politics". Also in 1919, Ablett's sole book Easy Outline of Economics was published through the Plebs' League. Between 1921 and 1926 he served as an executive member of the Miners' Federation of Great Britain.

== Later years ==
In 1918 Ablett became Miners' Agent for the Merthyr district of the South Wales Miners' Federation and sought the union's nomination for the post of General Secretary of the Miners' Federation of Great Britain, but was beaten by Frank Hodges, also an ex-Ruskin student. He again sought the post in 1924, this time coming third behind Arthur Cook. Arthur Horner, a former pupil of Ablett's, explained why he voted for Cook instead:

Ablett ... was a thoughtful logical Marxist who did not bother about personal popularity and who would not fail in anything he decided to try. But ... he would be inclined to try one path and pursue it to the end. Cook on the other hand would examine half a dozen paths and would try the lot ... This I said was a time for new ideas. We needed an agitator, a man with a sense of adventure and I believed Cook was the man.

The period after the war proved difficult for the mining areas, and the Merthyr area suffered severely in the 1920s. When the miners were locked out by employers in 1921 and 1926, things went from bad to worse. At the end of the 1926 lockout, Ablett made a deal with the managers to try to keep the Plymouth Hill pits open, contrary to his lifelong belief of not yielding an inch to employers. This caused him to be mocked by radical elements of the union and labour movement.

Ablett had always been a heavy drinker, a phenomenon not uncommon in the physically demanding world of the South Wales coalfield, and his partiality for whiskey contributed to his decline. He later described how he "cruelly abused my body to keep up the family tradition of hard and successful work." Fellow miners had tolerated his drinking for years, but by the late 1920s it was affecting his work. Dai Dan Evans, a contemporary, recalled that Ablett's drinking led to the closure of the Central Labour College in 1929, describing Ablett and fellow educator Bill Craik as "drinking partners you see, not attending to their duty". Ablett was fined in 1927 for being drunk and disorderly in London when he was supposed to be attending a committee meeting. He lost his influence on the Labour movement and lost his seats on the executive committee of the South Wales Miners' Federation, the management committee of the Miners' Federation of Great Britain, and the board of governors of the Central Labour College.

In later life Ablett struggled with alcoholism. He died of cancer at his home, Rock Villa in Dyke Street', Merthyr Tydfil, in 1935.

== Legacy ==
Aneurin Bevan, Labour politician and founder of the National Health Service, described Ablett as "a leader of great intellectual power and immense influence." Will Lawther, a pupil of Ablett's at the Central Labour College who later became a prominent miners' union leader, described him as "the greatest pre-war Marxist." The Miners' Next Step has been described as a landmark document in British labour history.

His educational philosophy, embodied through the Plebs' League, helped establish independent working-class education programmes that countered mainstream liberal educational approaches. His textbook Easy Outline of Economics was used to popularise Marxist economics within the labour movement.

Ablett played the major role in the political education of Arthur Horner, who later served as Secretary General of the National Union of Mineworkers.

== See also ==
- Syndicalism
- Industrial unionism
- Central Labour College

== Notes ==
Trade union offices
Preceded by Thomas Isaac Mardy Jones	Checkweighman at Mardy Colliery; 1910–1917	Succeeded by Ted Williams
Preceded by John Williams	Agent for the Merthyr District of the South Wales Miners' Federation; 1915–1933	Position abolished
Preceded by New position	Agent for the Merthyr, Aberdare and Dowlais District of the South Wales Miners' Federation; 1934–1935; With: Owen Powell	Succeeded by Emlyn Thomas
