= Craik =

Craik may refer to:

== People ==
- Charles Craik, American chemist
- Dinah Craik (1826–1887), English novelist
- Donald Craik (1935–1981), Canadian politician
- Fergus I. M. Craik (born 1935), Scottish psychologist
- George Lillie Craik (1798–1866), Scottish man of letters
- Henry Craik (evangelist) (1805–1866), Scottish Hebraist and theologian
- Sir Henry Craik, 1st Baronet (1846–1927), Scottish politician
- James Craik (1730–1814), Physician General of the United States Army
- John Craik-Henderson (1890–1971), British politician
- Kenneth Craik (1914–1945), English philosopher and psychologist
- Stephen Craik (born 1964), British DJ, musician, actor and rapper
- Wendy Craik (born 1949), Australian zoologist and company director
- William Craik (politician) (1761–1814), American politician from Maryland
- William Craik (educationalist) (born 1881), Scottish promoter of independent working class education

== Places ==
- Craik, Scottish Borders
- Craik, Saskatchewan
- Rural Municipality of Craik No. 222, Saskatchewan
- Craik Forest
- James Craik, Argentina, a city in Córdoba, Argentina

== Other ==
- Craik Sustainable Living Project
