= The Miners' Next Step =

Political pamphlet by Noah Ablett

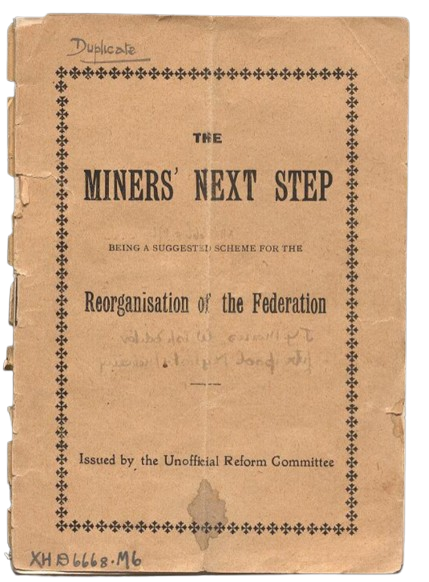
- The front cover of the pamphlet. From the collections of the National Library of Wales
- Author: Noah Ablett on behalf of the Unofficial Reform Committee
- Language: English
- Subject: Syndicalism
- Published: 1912
- Publisher: Plebs' League
- Publication place: United Kingdom of Great Britain and Ireland
- Media type: Pamphlet
- Text: The Miners' Next Step at Wikisource

The Miners' Next Step was a syndicalist pamphlet published in 1912 by the Unofficial Reform Committee in South Wales. Written primarily by Noah Ablett and other members of the Plebs' League, the document emerged from widespread dissatisfaction with the South Wales Miners' Federation's leadership and their policy of conciliation with mine owners following industrial conflicts, particularly the Cambrian Combine strike.

The pamphlet presented a systematic critique of trade union bureaucracy, arguing that "all leaders become corrupt, in spite of their good intentions" and advocating for direct workers' control rather than state ownership. It proposed radical reorganisation based on "Decentralisation for Negotiating, Centralisation for Fighting" and introduced tactical innovations such as the "irritation strike".

The document synthesised economic analysis with syndicalist theory, calling for immediate demands including a minimum wage of eight shillings per day and a seven-hour working day, alongside the ultimate objective of workers democratically controlling industry. The pamphlet caused considerable alarm in establishment circles and became the subject of parliamentary debate, whilst its influence transformed South Wales mining leadership with syndicalists replacing moderate leaders. Modern historians recognise it as one of the most sophisticated expressions of British syndicalist thought and a foundational text in Wales's transition from Victorian Lib-Lab politics to twentieth-century socialism.

== Background ==
Ablett had embraced syndicalism while studying at Ruskin College, and was a founding member of the Plebs' League. On his return to Rhondda, Ablett found himself in connection with like-minded socialists William Mainwaring, Noah Rees, Will Hay and A.J. Cook. In 1911 the Cambrian Combine dispute ended with the Tonypandy riots, which in turn caused ill feelings towards the then Liberal government after Home Secretary Winston Churchill ordered the deployment of the British Army to suppress the workers.

== Synopsis ==
The Miners' Next Step was a sustained critique of the style of union leadership shown by the likes of William "Mabon" Abraham who had been seen as too liberal in his dealings with the coalowners during such disputes as the Welsh coal strike of 1898. The pamphlet called for Decentralization for Negotiating, Centralization for Fighting, The use of the Irritation Strike, Joint Action by Lodges, Unifying the men by unifying demands, The Elimination of the Employer, against the Nationalization of Mines and Industrial Democracy.

The first section, "Old Policy Outworn", provides a detailed economic critique of the Federation's conciliation policy since 1900. The authors demonstrate through careful analysis that despite coal prices rising nearly 6 shillings per ton, miners received only 50% wage increases instead of the 60% they should have gained. The chapter exposes how arbitration awards, particularly Sir David Dale's 1902 award, and subsequent agreements had systematically reduced wages by over 10% whilst employers profited from protections that never operated as intended.

Section II, "Present Position Criticism", examines the shift towards direct membership control that began in 1910, when miners insisted on ballot votes for agreement ratification. The chapter analyses the Cambrian and Aberdare disputes as examples of how leadership interference consistently prejudiced workers' cases and constrained their ability to settle disputes independently.

The third section, "The Goal We Should Strive For", contains the pamphlet's most theoretically sophisticated analysis of leadership structures. The authors argue that "all leaders become corrupt, in spite of their good intentions" because the growth of power among members necessarily diminishes leaders' prestige, creating an inherent conflict of interest. This section outlines their vision for industrial democracy and workers' control, explicitly opposing nationalisation of mines as merely creating state capitalism and instead calling for direct workers' control through elected management.

Section IV, "Constitution We Need", details proposals for democratic reorganisation. These include monthly delegate conferences, direct election of executives by ballot, exclusion of permanent officials from leadership positions, and centralised funds with decentralised tactical control. The authors propose that "all power of legislation shall remain in the hands of the members, through the lodge and the ballot vote."

The fifth and concluding section, "Policy of the New Organisation", presents the tactical framework, including the famous principle of "Decentralisation for Negotiating, Centralisation for Fighting." This section introduces the concept of the "irritation strike" - maintaining work whilst reducing output to pressure employers without the costs of full stoppages. The pamphlet's programme includes immediate demands for a minimum wage of 8 shillings per day and a seven-hour working day, alongside the ultimate objective of workers taking over and administering industries themselves. The document concludes with a vision of "real democracy in real life, making for real manhood and womanhood" through industrial organisation that would "ultimately take over the mining industry, and carry it on in the interests of the workers."

== Analysis ==
=== Theoretical Framework and Innovation ===
The Miners' Next Step represented what historian Ralph Darlington described as "a precise distillation of a set of revolutionary demands, allied to the day to day tasks of running a trade union". The pamphlet synthesised syndicalist theory with Marxist analysis, creating what the National Library of Wales noted as "a highly publicised syndicalist manifesto that argued for reformation in the ownership, control and organization of the coal pits" with "its mixture of Syndicalism and Marxism".

The document's theoretical innovation lay in its rejection of both capitalist ownership and state control. As academic Tim Evans argues, the pamphlet "urged workers to reject the idea of an identity of interest between workers and employers and instead argued that 'a policy of open hostility should be installed'". This position distinguished it from both moderate trade unionism and state socialist approaches, advocating instead for direct workers' control of industry.

=== Critique of Trade Union Leadership ===
The pamphlet's analysis of trade union bureaucracy proved particularly influential. It argued that the SWMF should be constructed "to fight rather than to negotiate" and should be "based on the principle that we can only get what we are strong enough to win and retain". This critique extended beyond immediate grievances to a fundamental analysis of how union officials, separated from workplace discipline, developed conservative tendencies.

The document's famous assertion that "all leaders become corrupt, in spite of their good intentions" reflected a sophisticated understanding of bureaucratic dynamics. As one analysis noted, this position argued that "the growth of power in the members of an organisation would diminish the prestige and titles of the leaders, pushing those leaders towards opposing a decentralisation of power".

=== Impact on Welsh Mining Communities ===
The pamphlet's influence extended far beyond its immediate readership. Following the Cambrian Combine Strike, "the aftermath saw the removal of many of the 'moderates' from the 'Fed', with their places taken by syndicalists and other radicals". This transformation of union leadership demonstrated the document's practical impact on South Wales mining politics.

The pamphlet's call for democratisation and direct action was particularly significant because "Labour's dominance was only consolidated in the grim inter-war period" following "the defeat of the 1926 General Strike [which] was key because it marginalised the pre-First-World-War syndicalism represented by The Miners Next Step".

=== Educational and Cultural Influence ===
The document emerged from and contributed to a broader educational movement within Welsh mining communities. Noah Ablett and other Plebs' League members "took syndicalism and revolutionary Marxism with them, setting up local Plebs' Leagues and discussion groups, and, most importantly, intervening in the strikes and uprisings of 1910-14".

This educational dimension was crucial to the pamphlet's lasting influence. As one historian noted, Ablett's legacy rested on "his uncompromising attitude to class conflict" and his role as both "syndicalist, teacher, scholar and autodidact steeped in classical Marxism".

=== International Context and Comparative Significance ===
The Miners' Next Step must be understood within the broader context of international syndicalism. The document emerged during "a period of intense industrial conflict that occurred in several countries simultaneously in the years leading up to the First World War, and which became known as the Great Unrest".

The pamphlet's approach differed from syndicalist movements elsewhere by combining workplace militancy with sophisticated theoretical analysis. As one scholar observed, Welsh syndicalism was notable for its "extreme distrust of 'leaders'; combined with moral outrage; the vast power that lies in education for and by people; the willingness to unite not only morally but practically; the confidence in ordinary people to conduct their own affairs".

=== Limitations and Contradictions ===
Despite its influence, the pamphlet embodied contradictions that limited its practical application. As historians Tony Cliff and Donny Gluckstein observed, "the inevitable endpoint of their political logic was the capturing of [leadership positions]" despite syndicalist opposition to traditional leadership structures.

The document's strategy of "boring from within" existing union structures proved problematic. The [nofficial Reform Committee "was a channel upwards for rank and file grievances, but it also carried the best militants up the structure of the union and dropped them into the bureaucratic mire when they reached the top".

=== Legacy and Contemporary Relevance ===
The Miners' Next Step has been recognised as a landmark document in labour history. Revolutionary socialist Paul Foot described it as "one of the landmarks in our trade union literature" that "exposed the treacherous role which the union leaders had played in the struggle with the coal owners".

The pamphlet's emphasis on rank-and-file control and workplace democracy continues to influence contemporary labour movements. Sociologist Hilary Wainwright noted that the pamphlet put "the stress on trade union members as independent thinkers rather than 'the masses'" with "an understanding of collectivity as relationships between individuals as creative social subjects".

=== Historiographical Assessment ===
Modern historians have recognised the document's significance whilst acknowledging its limitations. The Dictionary of Welsh Biography notes that it "contains a plea for the formation of one vast industrial union, and advocates workers' control and ownership of industry" and "had a large sale and provoked intense discussion in the industrial areas of the country".

Ralph Darlington, Professor of Employment Relations at the University of Salford, in his comprehensive study Radical Unionism: The Rise and Fall of Revolutionary Syndicalism, positions The Miners' Next Step within the broader international syndicalist movement, arguing that it represented "the best practical application in Britain at this time of syndicalist ideas". Darlington's analysis, described by the International Journal of Social History as delivering "an informative representation of syndicalism that highlights its essential features", places the pamphlet within a comparative framework examining syndicalist movements across six countries.

Contemporary analysis suggests the pamphlet's enduring relevance lies in its demonstration that "Welsh syndicalism has been shown here to be capable of providing a guide; through an extreme distrust of 'leaders'; combined with moral outrage; the vast power that lies in education for and by people", offering lessons for contemporary movements seeking to challenge both capital and state power.

Historian David Egan's work in Llafur, the journal of Welsh labour history, particularly his 1985 article "Noah Ablett, 1883–1935", provides crucial biographical context for understanding the pamphlet's origins and impact. Egan's research, alongside that of labour historians Hywel Francis and Dai Smith in The Fed: A History of the South Wales Miners' Federation in the Twentieth Century, establishes The Miners' Next Step as a pivotal document in the transition from Victorian Lib-Lab politics to twentieth-century socialism in Wales.

Recent historiographical debate has focused on the pamphlet's theoretical sophistication. Kenneth O. Morgan's assessment that Ablett was "the one original thinker Wales has produced in the last hundred years" reflects a growing recognition of the pamphlet's intellectual contributions to political theory. This view contrasts with earlier dismissals of syndicalism as merely an immature precursor to Bolshevism, suggesting a more nuanced understanding of the pamphlet's place in the history of socialist thought.
