= Plebs' League =

British political and educational organisation 1908 to 1926

- Predecessor: Unofficial Marxist study groups at Ruskin College
- Successor: National Council of Labour Colleges
- Formation: November 1908
- Founder: Noah Ablett and students at Ruskin College, Oxford
- Dissolved: 1926
- Type: Educational and political organisation
- Legal status: Absorbed by National Council of Labour Colleges
- Location(s): Oxford (initially), later London and nationwide
- Region served: United Kingdom
- Members: Working-class students and activists
- Key people: Noah Ablett, Ebby Edwards, A. J. Cook, Mark Starr, John Maclean, Dennis Hird
- Publication: Plebs' Magazine (1909–1926)
- Affiliations: Central Labour College, Socialist Labour Party, Communist Party of Great Britain

The Plebs' League was a British educational and political organisation founded in 1908 that pioneered Independent Working Class Education based on Marxist principles. Established by Noah Ablett and fellow students at Ruskin College, Oxford, the League emerged from opposition to the college's liberal educational approach and rejection of Marxist economic theory.

The League's formation was precipitated by the 1909 Ruskin College strike, when students and staff protested the dismissal of Principal Dennis Hird for his support of radical educational content. Following the strike's failure, the League helped establish the Central Labour College in London as an independent alternative to mainstream adult education institutions. The organisation operated throughout the United Kingdom, with particularly strong branches in South Wales, Scotland, and Lancashire, serving industrial working-class communities through evening classes and study groups.

Central to the League's educational philosophy was the concept that workers required their own educational institutions, entirely free from middle-class patronage and liberal educational assumptions. Unlike conventional adult education, which the League viewed as serving to integrate workers into the existing capitalist system, their approach sought to develop class consciousness and revolutionary understanding through the study of Marxist political economy, history, and philosophy.

The League published the influential Plebs' Magazine and developed innovative pedagogical methods that emphasised participatory discussion, connection between theory and practice, and student-centred learning. These educational innovations influenced adult education practice well beyond radical circles. The organisation's decline in the 1920s culminated in its absorption by the National Council of Labour Colleges in 1926, though its legacy continued to influence working-class education, trade union training, and radical political movements throughout the twentieth century.

== History ==
=== Background ===
Central to the League's formation was Noah Ablett, a miner from the Rhondda who led a group at Ruskin College, Oxford challenging lecturers' opposition to Marxism. Ablett arrived at Ruskin in 1907 through a scholarship scheme for working men in trade unions but became disillusioned with the college's paternalistic approach and reluctance to engage with Marxist economic theory.

Ablett opposed Ruskin's liberal educational philosophy, which emphasised gradual social reform rather than revolutionary transformation. College authorities viewed Marxist ideas as dangerously subversive, preferring practical subjects and moderate political theory that would help workers advance within the existing system.

In 1907–08, Ablett led unofficial Marxist political economy classes attended by Ebby Edwards and others. These evening and weekend study groups focused on Marx, Engels, and contemporary socialist theorists that college authorities viewed with suspicion. The classes grew popular among students who felt Ruskin's conventional approach failed to address working-class realities or provide tools to understand capitalist exploitation.

Tensions escalated throughout 1908, with confrontations over curriculum and teaching methods creating a polarised atmosphere. College officials pressured Ablett to moderate his views or face disciplinary action.

Tensions peaked when Ablett returned to South Wales in 1908, promoting Marxist education through Independent Labour Party branches. His Rhondda valley activities galvanised support for alternative education independent of middle-class liberal influence.

In autumn 1908, students and graduates began organising the Plebs' League. Meeting in Oxford lodging houses and public houses, they planned an organisation to challenge both Ruskin's philosophy and adult education's entire structure.

Students and former students at Ruskin founded the Plebs' League in November 1908, launching the Plebs' Magazine. The name evoked Rome's plebeian class, emphasising commitment to working-class education rather than patronising charity. Like the Roman plebs fighting patrician control, workers should control their own educational destiny. In the first Plebs issue (February 1909), Ablett wrote a foundational article on Independent Working Class Education, outlining the principle that workers needed their own institutions free from bourgeois control. This manifesto became central to the League's identity and influenced similar movements across Britain.

The League ran classes teaching Marxist and later syndicalist ideas, offering a class-conscious alternative to mainstream adult education.

=== The 1909 Ruskin College Strike ===
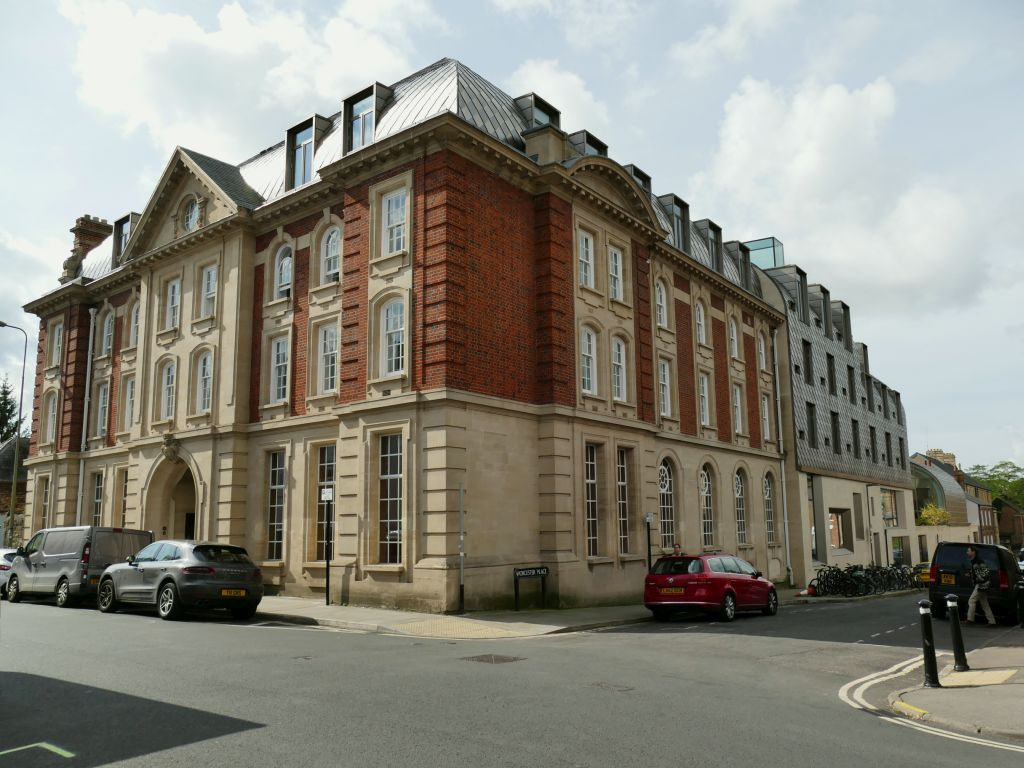
Ruskin College, Oxford, where the 1909 strike took place

The tensions that had been building at Ruskin College throughout 1908 reached a critical point in early 1909, leading to one of the most significant confrontations in the history of working-class education. The conflict centred around the college's Principal, Dennis Hird, a progressive educator who had increasingly found himself at odds with the college's governing body over the direction of the institution.

Dennis Hird had been appointed Principal in 1903 and initially represented a compromise between different educational philosophies. However, by 1908 he had become sympathetic to the students' demands for more radical content in the curriculum. Unlike his predecessors, Hird believed that working-class students should be exposed to a full range of economic and political theories, including Marxism, rather than being protected from ideas that the governing body considered dangerous.

The college's governing body, dominated by liberal philanthropists and moderate trade union leaders, viewed Hird's approach with growing alarm. They were particularly concerned about the influence of Noah Ablett and other radical students, and the informal Marxist study groups that were operating alongside the official curriculum. The governors feared that allowing such activities would damage Ruskin's reputation and jeopardise its funding from donors who expected the college to produce moderate, responsible working-class leaders rather than revolutionary agitators.

The crisis came to a head in early 1909 when the governing body issued an ultimatum to Hird, demanding that he suppress the radical activities and conform to their vision of appropriate working-class education. When Hird refused to comply, arguing that academic freedom required exposure to all significant economic theories, the governors dismissed him from his position in March 1909.

The dismissal of Hird triggered an immediate and dramatic response from the student body. Led by members of the newly formed Plebs' League and supported by sympathetic faculty, the students declared a strike and refused to attend classes. They demanded Hird's reinstatement and fundamental changes to the college's governance structure that would give students and staff a voice in educational policy. The striking students occupied buildings, organised alternative classes, and appealed for support from trade unions and socialist organisations across the country. The strike lasted for several months and attracted considerable attention from the labour movement. However, the college authorities refused to compromise, and it became clear that the rebels would need to establish their own institution if they wanted to pursue their educational vision. With support from sympathetic trade unions and socialist organisations, the striking students and their allies began planning an alternative college that would be entirely independent of liberal patronage.

The immediate result of the strike was the formation of the Central Labour College in August 1909, established in London with Dennis Hird as its first Principal. The new institution was funded entirely by trade union subscriptions and operated according to principles of independent working-class education that the Plebs' League had been advocating. Unlike Ruskin, the Central Labour College made no attempt to present a "balanced" view of economic theory, but explicitly adopted a Marxist perspective on political economy and social analysis.

The Central Labour College worked closely with the Plebs' League from its inception, with many League members serving as tutors and the organisation providing educational materials and coordination with local branches. This partnership represented the practical realisation of the League's vision of independent working-class education, free from the constraints and compromises that characterised institutions like Ruskin College.

The Ruskin College strike and its aftermath had profound implications for working-class education in Britain. It demonstrated both the possibilities and limitations of reform within existing institutions, while also showing the potential for genuinely independent educational initiatives when supported by organised labour. The events of 1909 would influence educational debates within the labour movement for decades to come and established the Plebs' League as a significant force in British radical politics.

=== Regional Expansion ===
Following the success of the Ruskin College strike and the establishment of the Central Labour College, the Plebs' League rapidly expanded its activities beyond Oxford into the major industrial regions of Britain. By 1910, the League was active in South Wales, Lancashire and Scotland, areas where militant trade unionism and socialist politics had created fertile ground for independent working-class education.

==== South Wales ====
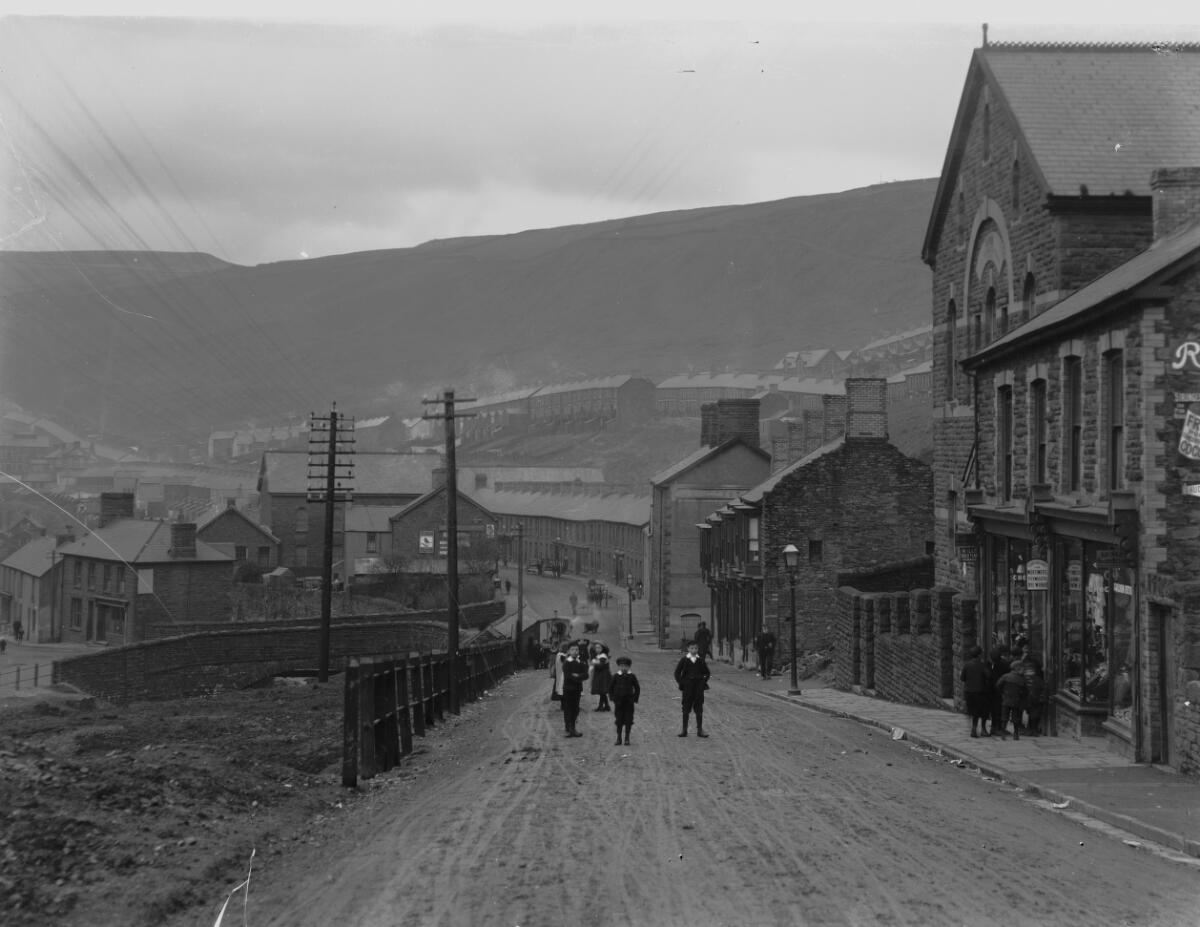
The Rhondda Valley coal mining community where Noah Ablett promoted League activities

South Wales became perhaps the League's most important regional stronghold, building on Noah Ablett's earlier work in the Rhondda valleys. The region's coal mining communities provided an ideal environment for the League's activities, with workers already radicalised by dangerous working conditions, industrial disputes, and exposure to socialist ideas through the Independent Labour Party and other organisations. Local branches organised evening classes in Marxist economics, often meeting in miners' institutes and trade union halls throughout the coalfield.

The League's work in South Wales was particularly influenced by the growing syndicalist movement, which emphasised direct action by workers rather than parliamentary politics. Key activists included A. J. Cook, who would later become a prominent leader of the miners' union, and William Mainwaring, both of whom had been influenced by Ablett's teaching at Ruskin College. These men helped establish a network of study groups that combined Marxist theory with practical discussion of industrial strategy and trade union tactics.

==== Scotland ====
In Scotland, the League's most prominent figure was John Maclean, a school teacher from Glasgow who had independently developed similar ideas about working-class education. Maclean had been conducting Marxist economics classes in Glasgow since 1906 and quickly aligned himself with the League's principles after its formation. His classes, held in venues across the west of Scotland, attracted large audiences of workers eager to understand the economic forces shaping their lives.

Maclean's approach differed somewhat from the League's other activists in that he placed greater emphasis on Scottish national identity and the specific conditions of Scottish workers. However, his commitment to independent working-class education and his rejection of bourgeois educational institutions aligned perfectly with the League's broader goals. The Scottish branches organised not only economics classes but also sessions on history, literature, and political theory, creating a comprehensive alternative to mainstream adult education.

==== Lancashire ====
Lancashire's industrial communities, particularly around Manchester and the textile towns, provided another important base for League activities. The region had a strong tradition of working-class self-improvement and mutual education, which the League was able to build upon. Local activists, including Mark Starr, organised classes that focused particularly on the economics of the textile industry and the international dimensions of capitalist exploitation.

The Lancashire branches were notable for their emphasis on practical applications of Marxist theory to contemporary industrial disputes. Classes often discussed current strikes and lockouts, analysing them through the lens of class struggle theory and drawing lessons for future action. This approach helped bridge the gap between abstract economic theory and the immediate concerns of working-class audiences.

==== Political Affiliations ====
The League's regional expansion brought it into contact with various radical political organisations, particularly the Socialist Labour Party, which represented De Leonist ideas in Britain. The SLP's emphasis on industrial unionism and revolutionary syndicalism resonated with many League activists, particularly in Scotland where John Maclean maintained close connections with the party. This relationship influenced the League's increasingly militant approach to both education and industrial action.

Following the Russian Revolution of 1917 and the formation of the Communist Party of Great Britain in 1920, many League activists found themselves drawn to the new party's revolutionary programme. However, the League maintained its focus on educational work rather than direct political action, seeing its role as providing the theoretical foundation for working-class consciousness that would enable effective political organisation. This relationship with the CPGB would prove both beneficial and problematic, as it brought resources and energy but also political tensions that would eventually contribute to the League's decline.

=== Decline and absorption ===
The Plebs' League's decline in the 1920s reflected broader changes in British politics and the labour movement following the end of the First World War. Several factors contributed to the organisation's gradual weakening and eventual absorption into the National Council of Labour Colleges in 1927.

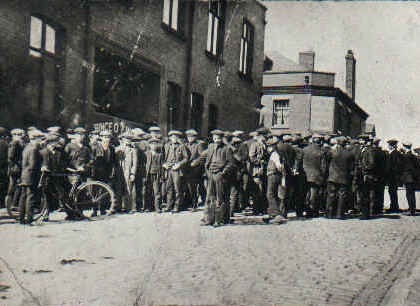
The 1926 United Kingdom general strike marked a turning point for radical labour organisations

The 1926 United Kingdom general strike marked a turning point for many radical organisations within the British labour movement. The strike's failure demonstrated the limitations of direct industrial action and led to a period of demoralisation and reassessment among militant activists. Many of the League's most committed members found themselves facing unemployment, blacklisting, or imprisonment in the strike's aftermath, severely disrupting local educational activities.

The League also faced increasing competition from other educational initiatives within the labour movement. The Trades Union Congress had begun developing its own educational programmes, whilst the Workers' Educational Association expanded its activities and attracted many working-class students who might previously have been drawn to the League's more radical offerings. These mainstream organisations could offer resources and recognition that the League, with its confrontational approach, found difficult to match.

Internal tensions within the League became more pronounced during the 1920s, particularly regarding its relationship with the Communist Party of Great Britain. Some members embraced the party's discipline and revolutionary strategy, whilst others preferred the League's traditional focus on educational autonomy. These disagreements weakened the organisation's unity and effectiveness, making it less capable of adapting to changing political circumstances. Financial pressures also played a significant role in the League's decline. The organisation had always depended on subscriptions from working-class members and donations from sympathetic trade unions, but economic difficulties in the 1920s reduced both sources of income. The costs of maintaining local branches, producing educational materials, and supporting tutors became increasingly difficult to sustain without broader institutional support.

The National Council of Labour Colleges, established in 1921 to coordinate various labour education initiatives, offered a potential solution to these difficulties. The NCLC could provide administrative support, financial resources, and access to a broader network of educational institutions. However, absorption into the NCLC also meant accepting a more moderate approach that emphasised practical education over revolutionary theory.

The final negotiations for the League's absorption took place throughout 1926 and early 1927, with the formal merger completed in 1927. Many of the League's educational functions were transferred to NCLC control, whilst local branches were either incorporated into the larger organisation or gradually wound down. The decision was controversial among League members, with some viewing it as a necessary adaptation to changed circumstances whilst others saw it as a betrayal of the organisation's founding principles.

Despite the League's organisational demise, the Plebs' Magazine continued to appear for many years under NCLC auspices, maintaining some continuity with the original movement's educational mission. However, the magazine's content gradually became less radical and more aligned with mainstream labour movement positions, reflecting the broader institutionalisation of working-class education that the League had originally opposed.

The League's absorption marked the end of one of Britain's most significant experiments in independent working-class education, but its influence continued through the many activists who had been shaped by its approach and the educational methods it had pioneered. Many former League members continued their educational work within other organisations, carrying forward the principle that workers needed their own institutions for developing class consciousness and political understanding.

== Educational philosophy and methods ==
The Plebs' League challenged prevailing approaches to working-class education by insisting that workers required their own distinctive educational approach based on class-conscious analysis rather than access to mainstream liberal education.

Central to the League's philosophy was "Independent Working Class Education," distinguishing their approach from "education for the working class." The League argued that conventional adult education was compromised by middle-class patronage and served to integrate workers into the capitalist system rather than develop revolutionary consciousness. Educational content, methods, and control should be determined by working-class organisations themselves, free from employers, philanthropists, or state influence.

The League's educational programme was explicitly grounded in Marxist political economy. Unlike mainstream adult education which presented various economic theories as equally valid, the League insisted Marx's analysis provided the only scientific understanding of capitalism. Classes began with basic concepts like surplus value and class struggle, building toward analysis of contemporary developments. This theoretical foundation was presented as a practical tool for understanding working-class experience, with tutors encouraging students to apply Marxist concepts to workplace situations and industrial disputes.

The League developed distinctive teaching methods reflecting democratic principles. Classes were organised as discussion groups where students contributed experiences and insights, with tutors serving as facilitators rather than authorities. Students brought newspaper clippings and workplace experiences for collective analysis, bridging theory and practical application while developing analytical confidence.

The curriculum centred on political economy but included history, philosophy, and trade union organisation. Historical study focused on capitalism's development and working-class struggle as ongoing processes. The League produced educational materials through the Plebs' Magazine and Textbook Committee, designed for working-class audiences while maintaining theoretical rigour.

The League systematically critiqued liberal education's claims to political neutrality, arguing it implicitly supported existing social relations. They particularly opposed "balanced" presentation of viewpoints, which suggested exploiter and exploited had equally valid perspectives. Liberal education's focus on individual advancement weakened working-class solidarity by encouraging escape from class rather than collective improvement.

The League's pedagogical innovations influenced educational practice beyond radical circles. Their emphasis on participatory discussion, theory-practice connections, and student-centred learning anticipated later adult education developments. However, their explicitly political approach remained controversial, with critics arguing it constituted indoctrination while supporters contended all education was inherently political.

== Legacy and influence ==
Despite its brief existence, the Plebs' League significantly influenced working-class education, radical politics, and adult learning in Britain, establishing principles that inspired educational movements long after 1927.

The League's challenge to paternalistic adult education assumptions helped establish new standards by insisting working-class students could engage with complex theoretical material and make their own educational choices. Mainstream institutions gradually adopted more participatory and student-centred approaches. The League's methods of connecting theory with practical experience became widely adopted, even by institutions rejecting its Marxist content, helping establish adult education as a field valuing students' life experience.

Trade unions initially suspicious of the League's radical approach gradually adopted its emphasis on economic analysis and class-conscious education. The Miners' Federation, influenced by activists like A.J. Cook, developed programmes incorporating Marxist analysis alongside practical training. The League's insistence that workers understand broader economic and political contexts became accepted within trade unionism, developing leaders who articulated demands through social and economic principles rather than narrow interests.

League alumni played significant roles in twentieth-century British radical politics. A.J. Cook became a prominent trade union leader, while Mark Starr continued labour movement educational work for decades. John Maclean's influence on Scottish socialism extended beyond his League involvement, influencing generations of Scottish radical activists. The League's political education approach influenced the Communist Party of Great Britain, particularly when former members brought educational experience to party training programmes.

Internationally, League ideas spread through British emigrants. Mark Starr introduced League principles to American labour education, while others carried approaches to Australia, Canada, and South Africa. The League's emphasis on education for social transformation and oppressed groups controlling their educational processes became central to liberation pedagogy movements worldwide.

Although absorbed by the National Council of Labour Colleges, the League's innovations persisted within the broader labour college movement. The Central Labour College operated along League principles until 1929, and regional colleges maintained elements into the 1930s. The League's collectively-authored textbook series remained in use for decades, demonstrating that working-class organisations could produce sophisticated educational resources independently.

The League's critique of mainstream education continued resonating with later radical educators. During the 1960s-1970s, community education movements and radical pedagogy drew on League precedents, while its theory-practice connections influenced action research and participatory education methods. More recently, critical pedagogy advocates cite the League as an early example of transformational education, with its rejection of educational neutrality influencing contemporary debates about adult education in an era of increasing inequality. The League's legacy extends beyond its historical context, providing inspiration and insights for educational movements challenging dominant social relations.

== Plebs' Magazine ==
The Plebs' Magazine was the principal publication of the Plebs' League, launched simultaneously with the organisation's formation in November 1908. The magazine served as the primary vehicle for disseminating the League's educational philosophy and Marxist analysis to working-class audiences across Britain.

In the first issue, published in February 1909, Noah Ablett contributed the foundational article "The Relation of Ruskin College to the Labour Movement," outlining the need for Independent Working Class Education and establishing the magazine's commitment to challenging mainstream adult education approaches. The four-page editorial was likely written by George Sims, setting the tone for the publication's radical educational mission.

The magazine featured regular contributions from prominent League members and allied intellectuals. Maurice Dobb contributed several significant articles, including "The Importance of the Labour Value Theory" (September 1920) and a four-part series "Colonial and Imperialist Expansion: A Marxist Analysis" (September-December 1921), demonstrating the magazine's commitment to serious theoretical engagement with contemporary political and economic issues.

Plebs' Magazine served multiple educational functions beyond publishing theoretical articles. It provided practical guidance for League classes, advertised educational events, and maintained communication between regional branches. The magazine also serialised educational content that was later compiled into the League's textbook series, such as Noah Ablett's "Easy Outlines in Economics," based on articles first published in the magazine during 1909.

After the League's absorption by the National Council of Labour Colleges in 1926, the magazine continued publication under NCLC auspices, though its content gradually became less radical and more aligned with mainstream labour movement positions. The magazine maintained continuity with the original movement's educational mission until the 1960s, representing one of the longest-running publications in British working-class education.

== Publications ==
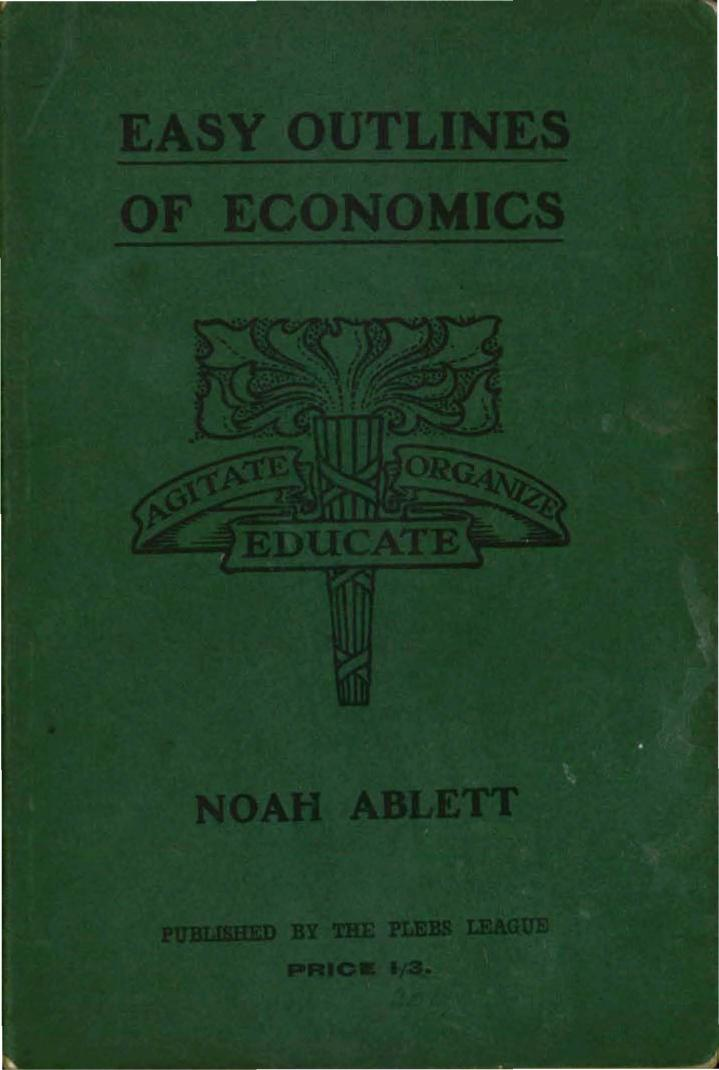
Front page of Easy Outlines of Economics by Noah Ablett, published in 1919.

Beyond the Plebs' Magazine, the League produced various educational materials to support independent working-class education. These publications reflected the organisation's commitment to providing Marxist analysis accessible to working-class students.

Early publications included Noah Ablett's Easy Outlines in Economics (Sheffield: Plebs' League, 1919), which expanded on articles originally published in the magazine during 1909. This work exemplified the League's approach of developing theoretical content through practical class discussion before publication.

The Plebs' League established the Plebs Textbook Committee after 1921, responsible for collective publishing of educational materials attributed to "communal production" rather than individual authors. The textbook series included works on psychology, modern imperialism, economics, economic geography, and European history. The most documented publication is the Outline of Modern Imperialism (London: Plebs League, 1922), which received international attention, including a Japanese translation published in 1929.
