= William Craik =

William Craik may refer to:

- William Craik (politician) (1761–1814), U.S. Representative from Maryland
- William Craik (educationalist) (1881–?), educationalist, promoter and practitioner of independent working class education
