= Central Labour College =

British higher education institution supported by trade unions

- Logo of the Plebs' League, which founded the Central Labour College in 1909
- Other name: The Labour College
- Type: Independent labour college
- Active: August 2, 1909–July 1929
- Endowment: Funded by National Union of Railwaymen and South Wales Miners' Federation
- Principal: Dennis Hird (1909–1920); William Craik (1920–1929)
- Academic staff: George Sims (Secretary); Alfred Hacking; Fred Charles
- Location: Oxford (1909-1911); Earl's Court, London (1911-1929), England
- Recognition: Trades Union Congress (1915)
- Closed temporarily 1917–1919 during World War I

The Central Labour College, also known as The Labour College, was a British higher education institution that provided independent working class education from 1909 to 1929. The college was founded by trade unions as an alternative to existing educational institutions, with the explicit aim of providing Marxist-influenced education for the working class outside the control of traditional academic establishments.

Established in Oxford as a direct response to the Ruskin College strike of 1909, the Central Labour College represented a significant development in the British labour movement of the early 20th century. The college was financially supported primarily by the National Union of Railwaymen and the South Wales Miners' Federation, reflecting the strong connection between industrial trade unions and educational advancement. Under the leadership of Dennis Hird, who had been dismissed from Ruskin College for supporting the striking students, the institution moved to Earl's Court, London in 1911 and became officially recognised by the Trades Union Congress in 1915.

The college played a crucial role in training a generation of Labour politicians and trade union leaders, with notable alumni including Aneurin Bevan, Jim Griffiths, and Arthur Jenkins. The institution's educational philosophy emphasised dialectical materialism and aimed to teach workers "how to think" rather than "what to think", distinguishing it from other adult education providers of the era. The college's closure in 1929, precipitated by the Great Depression and the withdrawal of financial support from the mining unions, marked the end of a significant chapter in British adult education and working-class political development.

== Background ==
=== The Plebs' League and independent working-class education ===
The origins of the Central Labour College lay in the growing dissatisfaction among working-class students with the approach taken by existing adult education institutions. The Plebs' League, founded in October 1908 by students and former students at Ruskin College, Oxford, represented a core group of Marxist-influenced activists who sought to establish truly independent working-class education. The League took its name from the plebs, the common people of ancient Rome, symbolising its commitment to education controlled by and for the working class rather than philanthropic or paternalistic institutions. The movement's intellectual lineage can be traced back to the Marxist study classes that James Connolly organised in Scotland in 1903, through their tutors such as William Paul, who was prominent in the Plebs League, the Socialist Labour Party, the Communist Party and later the National Council of Labour Colleges.

The movement for independent working-class education was based on the principle that "the working class should produce its own thinkers and organisers" and sought to create educational sites "beyond the authority of the state" and controlled directly by the working class. This philosophy stood in direct opposition to the approach taken by institutions such as the Workers' Educational Association, which working-class activists viewed as insufficiently radical and too closely tied to establishment interests.

=== The Ruskin College strike of 1909 ===
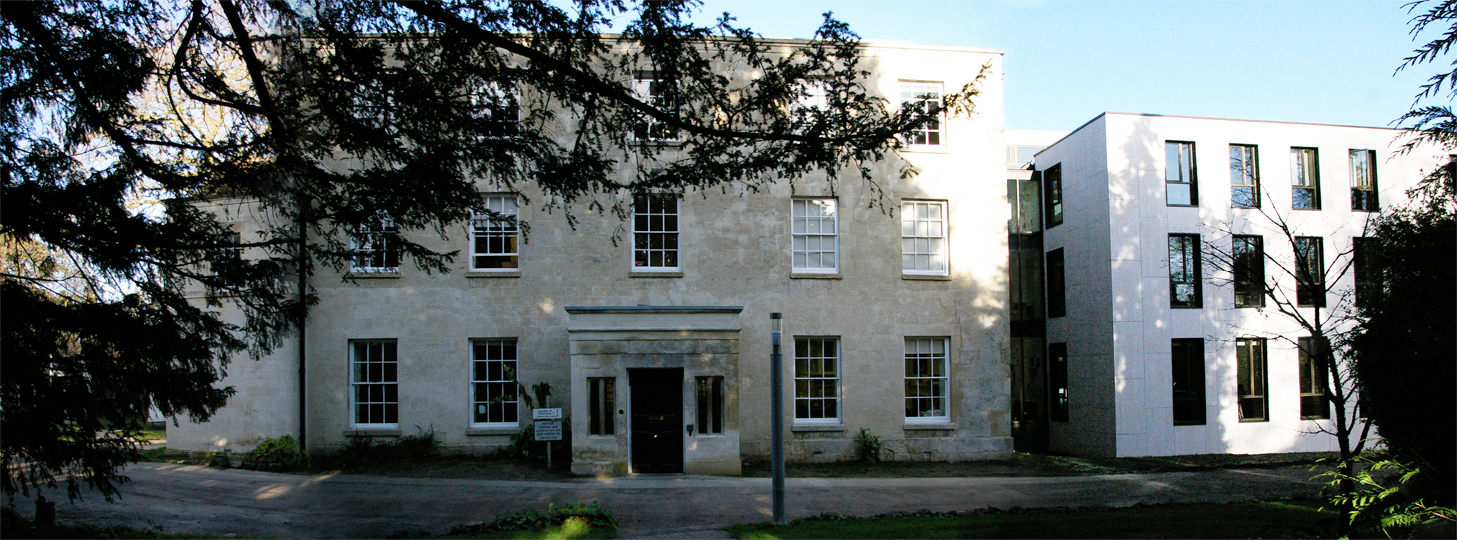
Ruskin College, Oxford, where the 1909 student strike led to the establishment of the Central Labour College

The immediate catalyst for the establishment of the Central Labour College was the Ruskin College strike of March-April 1909. The strike, which lasted from 26 March to 6 April 1909, was organised by students who conducted a boycott of lectures in protest at the college's educational approach and governance. The strike was led by figures such as Noah Ablett, a miner from the Rhondda, who became central to organising the student rebellion and was later described as playing a key role as "midwife of IWCE and author of The Miners' Next Step".

The striking students objected to Ruskin's refusal to teach historical materialism and Marxist economics, arguing that the college was failing to provide the kind of class-conscious education that working-class students required. The conflict came to a head when the college authorities dismissed several students and refused to compromise on curricular matters, leading to a complete breakdown in relations between the students and the college administration.

== Establishment ==
Following the failure of the Ruskin College strike, the Plebs' League organised a conference at Oxford on 2 August 1909, attended by approximately 200 trade union representatives. A resolution was passed calling for the establishment of a Central Labour College to provide independent working class education, outside of the control of the University of Oxford and other establishment institutions. The provisional committee controlling the new college was to consist of representatives of Labour, Co-Operative and Socialist societies, following the model of the Labour Representation Committee.

Logo of the South Wales Miners' Federation, one of the college's primary financial supporters

The college was supported financially by the National Union of Railwaymen and the South Wales Miners' Federation. The college was headed by Dennis Hird, who had been dismissed as principal of Ruskin for supporting the striking students. The college initially operated from two rented houses in Bradmore Road, Oxford, before moving to Earl's Court, London in 1911.

== Educational philosophy and curriculum ==
The Central Labour College distinguished itself from other adult education institutions through its explicitly Marxist educational philosophy and commitment to dialectical materialism. The college's approach was based on the principle of teaching workers "how to think" rather than "what to think", emphasising critical analysis and class consciousness over vocational training or cultural enrichment. This pedagogical approach aimed to develop independent thinkers capable of leading the labour movement rather than merely producing skilled workers for existing economic structures.

The curriculum was comprehensive and theoretically rigorous, explicitly stating that it was "grounded on a Marxist basis" and designed to provide students with a complete understanding of historical materialism and socialist theory. By 1914, the college was teaching students to "look for the causes of social evils and the problems arising therefrom in the material foundations of society; that these causes are in the last resort economic; that their elimination involves in the first place economic changes of such a character as to lead to the eradication of capitalist economy".

Core subjects included the History of Socialism in England, examining figures such as John Lilburne and Gerrard Winstanley, and "The Science of Understanding", which focused on historical materialism and Marx's conception of humans as "the historical products of social evolution - the self-made products of their own social activities (labour)". Students also studied the Trade Unions and Law, the Industrial Revolution, Imperialism, Advanced Economics and Economic Geography, and Sociology. The curriculum was designed to integrate theoretical understanding with technical expertise, covering both elementary education for rank and file workers and more advanced education for those capable of carrying their studies further.

The college's teaching staff reflected its commitment to independent working-class education. Beyond Dennis Hird, who served as the first Principal, the college employed William Craik as Vice-Principal from 1910, who later became Principal following Hird's death in 1920. Other core faculty members included George Sims, who served as Secretary and co-leader, Alfred Hacking, who taught English grammar and literature, and Fred Charles, who instructed students in industrial and political history. The college also attracted notable visiting lecturers, including Frank Horrabin, Winifred Batho, Rebecca West, Emily Wilding Davison, H. N. Brailsford, Arthur Horner, and Frederick Pethick-Lawrence.

Student life at the college was characterised by intense intellectual engagement and political debate. The educational environment fostered vigorous discussion, with students such as Aneurin Bevan famously engaging in political arguments "into the small hours most nights". This atmosphere of intellectual ferment was precisely what the college's founders had intended, creating a space where working-class students could develop their analytical capabilities and political consciousness away from the constraints of traditional academic institutions.

=== Publications and educational materials ===
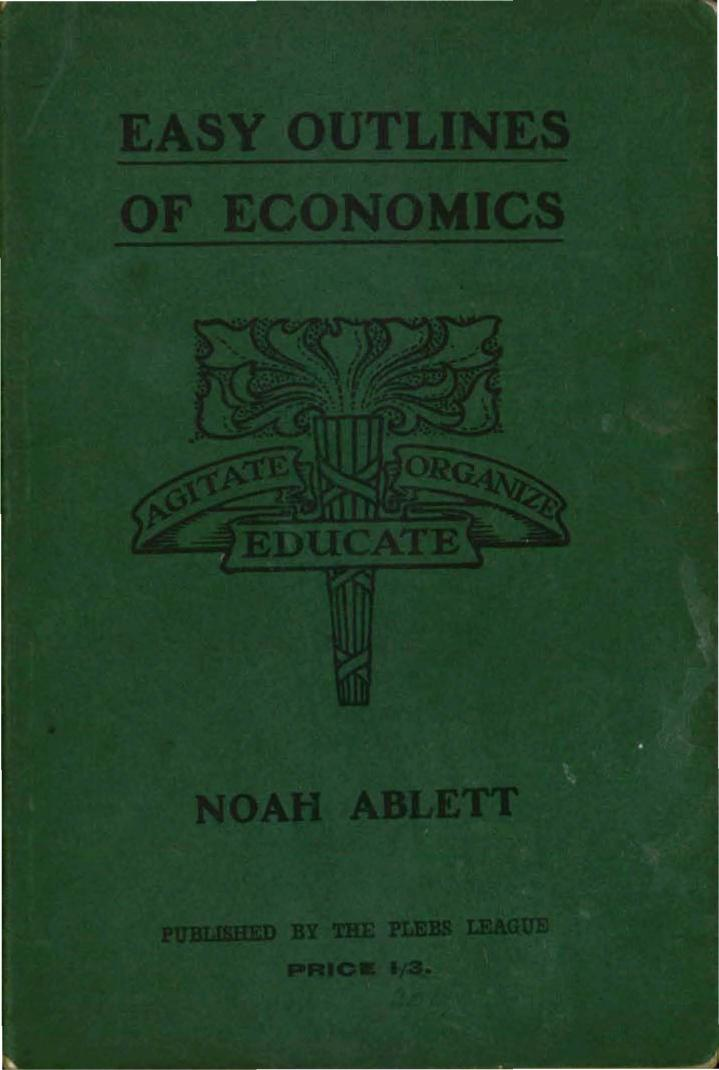
Easy Outline of Economics (1919) by Noah Ablett, one of the college's influential publications

The college and its associated Plebs' League developed an active publishing programme to support their educational mission. The Plebs Magazine became a key vehicle for promoting independent working-class education, with circulation reaching 6,000 copies monthly by the climactic period around 1920. The publications department, established in 1917, sold more than 25,000 copies of pamphlets such as What Does Education Mean to the Workers? demonstrating the reach of the college's educational influence beyond its residential students.

Among the most significant publications was Mark Starr's A Worker Looks at History (1917), described as "an accessible and considerable contribution to 'history from below'". Similarly, Noah Ablett's Easy Outline of Economics (1919) enjoyed wide circulation, providing working-class readers with accessible introductions to Marxist economic theory. These publications represented a significant attempt to create educational materials specifically designed for working-class audiences, free from the academic jargon that characterised much university-based adult education.

=== Women's involvement and the Women's Labour College initiative ===
The Central Labour College's relationship with women's education reflected both the progressive aspirations and the limitations of the early 20th-century labour movement. Between 1909 and 1912, Mrs Bridge Adams made ambitious attempts to establish a Women's Labour College, efforts that were "stamped with some of the assertion of the pre-1914 movement". She emphasised the need to develop women activists in the unions, inquiring "where are the sisters of the young men who are doing such good work for their class in South Wales?"

However, these efforts proved largely unsuccessful and gave way to the Women's League of the Central Labour College, which embraced socialists such as Dora Montefiore of the British Socialist Party and Rebecca West of The Clarion, as well as women trade unionists such as Grace Neal, General Secretary of the Domestic Workers Union. While it was urged that "the education of our working class women is just as important as that of the working class men", the role of the League was seen as subordinate and ancillary: to raise funds, establish a women's hostel and enrol more women students.

The experiment was largely a failure in terms of student recruitment. Apparently only three women studied at the Central Labour College: Alice Smith of the Lancashire Textile Operatives, Mary Howarth (another graduate of Plebs League classes in Lancashire), and Jean Dott. The approach taken reflected the limitations of the era, with little attention paid to feminist arguments and women's specific oppression, as "there was no sex war only class war; men were as much its victims as women".

== Development and recognition ==
In 1915, the college received official recognition from the Trades Union Congress, marking its acceptance as a legitimate institution within the organised labour movement. This recognition was significant as it demonstrated that the college's approach to working-class education had gained acceptance among trade union leadership, despite initial scepticism about its radical educational philosophy.

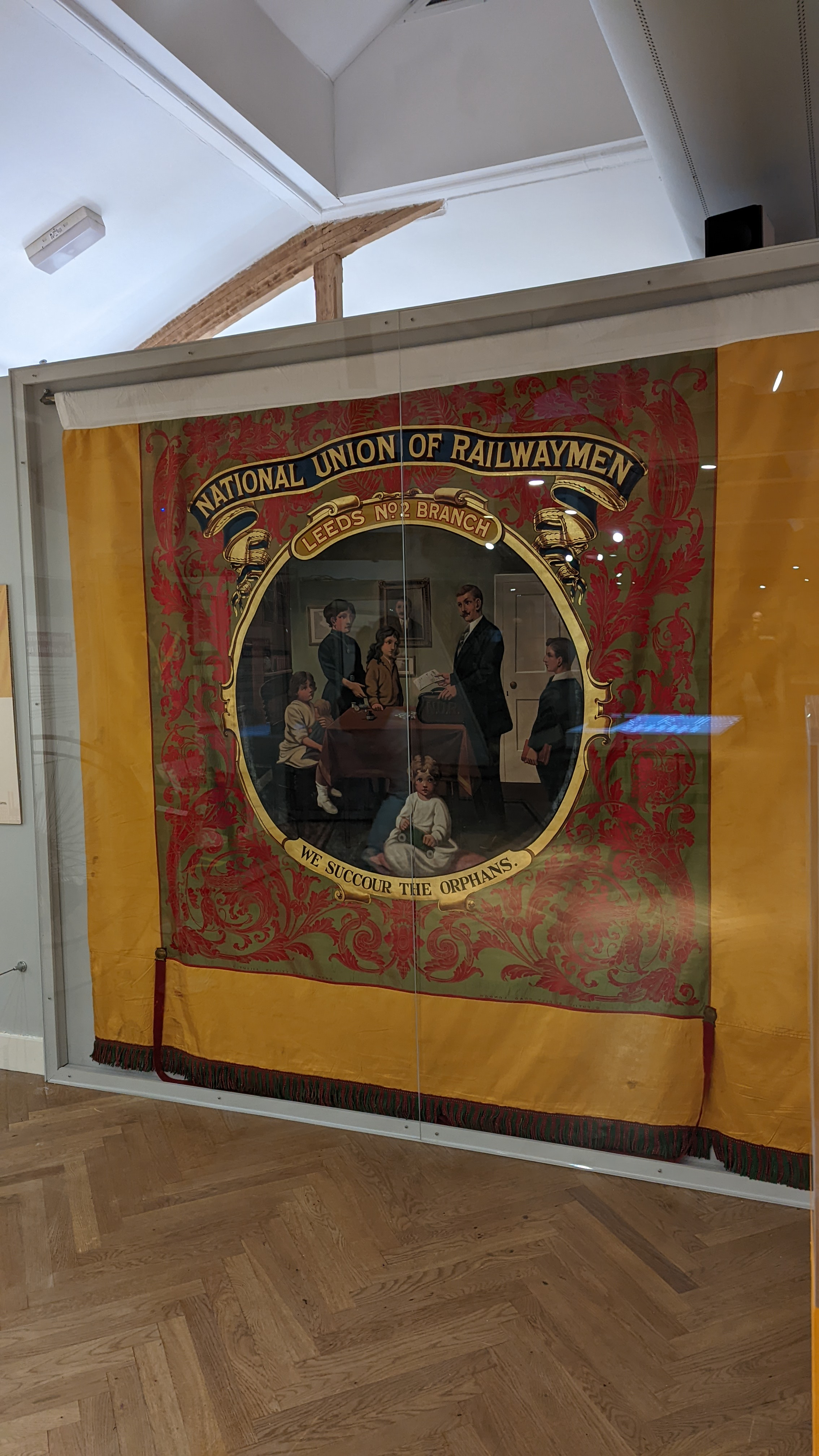
National Union of Railwaymen branch plaque, representing one of the college's key financial supporters

A major development came in 1921 when the college became the centre of the newly formed National Council of Labour Colleges (NCLC). This expansion reflected the growing influence of the independent working-class education movement, with the NCLC coordinating a network of labour colleges across Britain. By 1926-27, under the NCLC umbrella, there were 1,201 classes across Britain with 31,635 students, demonstrating the significant reach and impact of the movement that had originated with the Central Labour College.

The college's influence was reinforced by government reports identifying its work with industrial unrest. The key leaders of the war-time shop stewards movement Tom Bell, Arthur McManus and J.T. Murphy were active in the Plebs League. In 1920 King George himself expressed concern about the Labour Colleges to the President of the Board of Education, while government intelligence reports described the Central Labour College as "the fountainhead of Marxian teaching in this country ... responsible for the training of more dangerous revolutionaries than all the Communist parties put together".

The government's concern about the college's influence was matched by its awareness of the institution's role in promoting revolutionary consciousness. The Directorate of Intelligence reports in 1919-20 deplored the weakness of the Workers' Educational Association in countering the college's influence, noting that "Unfortunately almost the only agency in the field is the Labour Colleges which is imparting instruction in false economics". This assessment reflected the state's recognition that the college represented a genuine ideological challenge to the established order. The revolutionary pedagogue John McLean captured the significance of this educational work when he observed in 1917: "The greatest 'crime' I have committed in the eyes of the British government and the Scottish capitalist class has been the teaching of Marxian economics to the Scottish workers".

The college's success in training labour leaders became increasingly evident throughout the 1910s and 1920s. Former students occupied prominent positions in trade unions, particularly in the South Wales coalfield where "the majority of the Officials are either former resident students or have passed through the Plebs classes". The institution had succeeded in its goal of "schooling a whole generation of the brightest workers mainly from the mines and railways of Britain".

In 1926, a controversial proposal emerged to merge the Central Labour College with Ruskin College into a new Labour College based at Easton Lodge near Great Dunmow, Essex. However, the proposal faced significant opposition from several large unions who viewed it as a betrayal of the principles of independent working-class education. On 7 September 1926, the proposal by the General Council of the TUC to proceed was defeated on a card vote, preserving the college's independence but also highlighting growing tensions within the labour education movement.

== Challenges and early struggles ==
Despite its eventual influence, the college faced significant financial difficulties throughout its existence. Even in its early years, progress was slower than often imagined, with only 300 students in Plebs League classes in 1910 and circulation of the Plebs Magazine remaining under 1,000. There was "a heavy financial cloud hanging over the League" and the immediate pre-war period was described as "the most critical in the [Central] College's existence, time after time it appeared as though we must close down".

The college was forced to close temporarily in 1917 "for the duration" of the First World War, though by then protracted negotiations had ensured its takeover by the National Union of Railwaymen and South Wales Miners' Federation. When it reopened in 1919, its future seemed more secure, and the wartime militancy and impact of the Russian Revolution was reflected in a qualitative expansion of local classes, with 1,200 students attending classes in South Wales and 36 classes with 2,500 students in Scotland by 1917.

== Decline and closure ==
The college's fortunes became increasingly precarious in the late 1920s as the economic conditions that had supported its foundation began to deteriorate. By 1929, the mining industry was in severe decline due to the Great Depression, undermining the financial base that had sustained the institution for two decades. The college's dependence on funding from industrial unions, particularly the South Wales Miners' Federation, proved to be both its strength and its vulnerability.

In April 1929, a conference of the South Wales Miners' Federation voted to discontinue funding of the college unless additional levies could be raised from members. With the mining industry in crisis and unemployment rising, the Federation's members were unwilling to bear the additional financial burden required to maintain the college. No such funding was forthcoming, and attempts to transfer ownership of the college to the wider trade union movement proved unsuccessful, as other unions were reluctant to assume financial responsibility for an institution they had not directly supported.

By July 1929, it became clear that the college could not continue to operate without its primary source of funding. The closure marked not only the end of the Central Labour College but also, according to William Craik, the effective "de-capitation" of trade union education in Britain, as the focus shifted away from critical, class-conscious education towards more narrowly skills-based training.

== Impact and legacy ==
The Central Labour College's influence on British politics and the labour movement extended far beyond its relatively brief twenty-year existence. The college succeeded in its primary objective of training a generation of working-class leaders who would go on to play crucial roles in British political and industrial life throughout the 20th century. The institution's emphasis on developing critical thinking skills and class consciousness, rather than merely providing vocational training, produced graduates who were equipped to challenge existing power structures and advocate effectively for working-class interests. As contemporary observers noted, the college represented "a creative movement from below, a sustained attempt by workers to control their own education" in opposition to what they perceived as externally imposed and hostile educational approaches.

The college's alumni made significant contributions to British political life, with several becoming prominent Labour politicians and cabinet ministers. Aneurin Bevan, who served as Minister of Health in the post-war Attlee government and was instrumental in establishing the National Health Service, exemplified the type of principled, intellectually rigorous leadership that the college sought to develop. Similarly, Jim Griffiths, who became Secretary of State for Wales and Deputy Leader of the Labour Party, and Arthur Jenkins, who served as a Labour MP and trade union leader, demonstrated the college's success in nurturing political talent.

Beyond individual achievements, the Central Labour College played a pivotal role in establishing the principle of independent working-class education in Britain. The college's rejection of paternalistic approaches to adult education and its insistence on worker-controlled institutions influenced the broader development of labour education throughout the early 20th century. The National Council of Labour Colleges, which emerged from the Central Labour College's work, represented the most successful attempt to create a comprehensive system of working-class education independent of state or establishment control.

The college's educational philosophy also had lasting influence on Marxist and socialist educational theory. Its emphasis on dialectical materialism and the principle of teaching workers "how to think" rather than "what to think" provided a model for radical education that was studied and emulated by labour movements in other countries. The college's approach to combining theoretical education with practical political training helped establish a template for revolutionary education that influenced subsequent generations of labour educators.

However, the college's closure in 1929 also marked a significant turning point in British labour education. According to William Craik, the institution's demise led to the effective "de-capitation" of trade union education, as subsequent approaches focused more narrowly on skills training and industrial relations rather than the broader critical education that the Central Labour College had championed. This shift represented a move away from the radical educational vision that had inspired the college's founders, towards more pragmatic but ultimately less transformative approaches to working-class education.

The college's legacy continues to be felt in contemporary debates about the role of education in social and political change. Its example demonstrates both the potential and the limitations of independent working-class education, showing how such institutions can produce significant political leadership while remaining vulnerable to economic and political pressures. The Central Labour College's history provides important insights into the relationship between education, class consciousness, and political power that remain relevant to understanding the role of education in democratic societies.

== Notable alumni ==
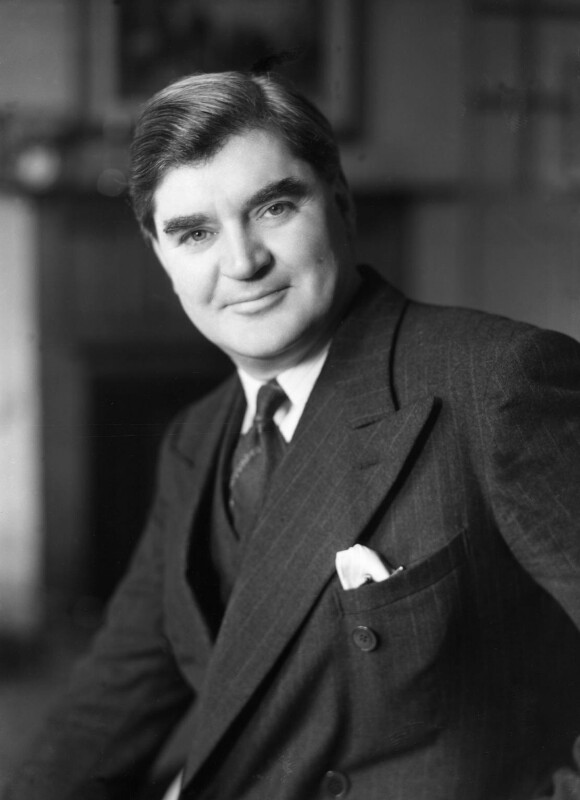
Aneurin Bevan in 1943, one of the college's most prominent alumni who became instrumental in establishing the National Health Service

The Central Labour College produced a remarkable generation of labour leaders, politicians, and intellectuals who went on to play significant roles in British political and industrial life. The college succeeded in its goal of "schooling a whole generation of the brightest workers mainly from the mines and railways of Britain". Many graduates occupied prominent positions in trade unions, with former students becoming particularly influential in the South Wales coalfield where "the majority of the Officials are either former resident students or have passed through the Plebs classes".

Among the most prominent alumni were several who became cabinet ministers and leading figures in the Labour Party. The diversity of careers pursued by graduates demonstrates the college's success in developing critical thinking skills that were applicable across various fields of public service and political activism.

=== Political leaders ===
- Aneurin Bevan, Labour MP and cabinet minister, instrumental in establishing the National Health Service
- Jim Griffiths, Labour MP, cabinet minister, Secretary of State for Wales and Deputy Leader of the Labour Party

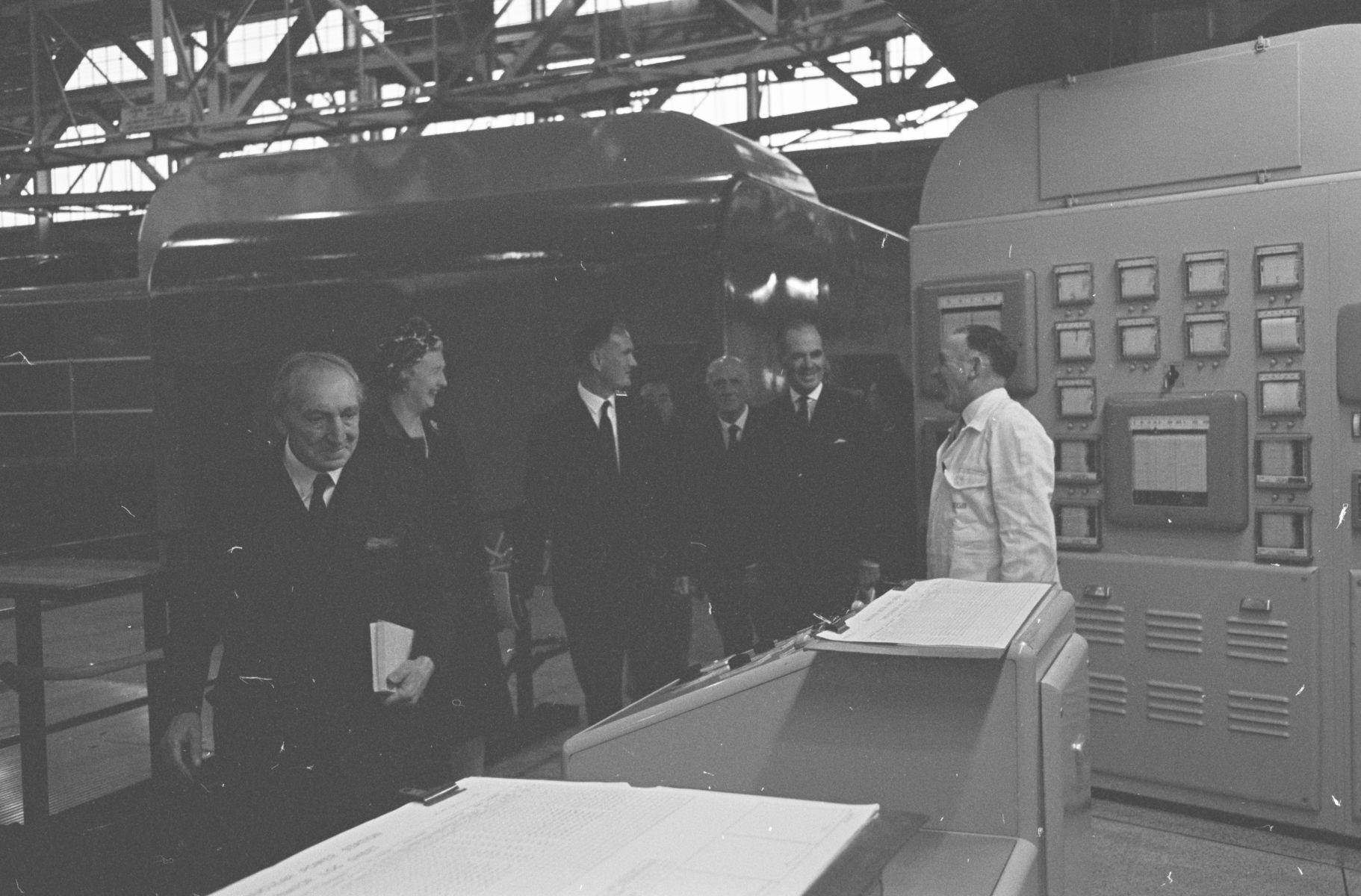
Jim Griffiths in 1968, alumnus of the Central Labour College who became Secretary of State for Wales

- Arthur Jenkins, Labour MP and trade unionist
- William Mainwaring, Labour MP and trade unionist
- William Paling, Labour MP and trade unionist
- Joseph Sparks, Labour MP and trade unionist
- Ivor Owen Thomas, Labour MP and trade unionist
- John Williams, Labour MP
- Ted Williams, Labour MP and diplomat

=== Co-operative and Labour movement figures ===
- Jack Bailey, Labour and Co-operative Party politician
- Dick Lewis, Labour and Co-operative Party politician
- Morgan Phillips, Labour politician and trade unionist, General Secretary of the Labour Party 1944-62

=== Trade union leaders ===
- Herbert Booth, trade unionist
- Will Lawther, Labour MP and trade unionist
- Bryn Roberts, trade unionist

=== Writers and intellectuals ===
- Harold Heslop, writer and political activist, described as one of the "proletarian novelists" who studied at the college
- Lewis Jones, writer and political activist, another of the "proletarian novelists"
- Mark Starr, British-American labour historian and educationalist, won Rhondda Miners Scholarship in 1915 and later became a major figure in the Plebs League and NCLC

=== Communist activists ===
- Idris Cox, communist activist and trade unionist

=== International figures ===
- Christopher Pattinson, British-born Canadian politician

== See also ==
- Scottish Labour College

== Bibliography ==
- Atkins, John (1981). Neither Crumbs nor Condescension: the Central Labour College, 1909-1915. Aberdeen: Aberdeen People's Press. ISBN 0906074134.
- Craik, William White (1964). The Central Labour College, 1909-29: A chapter in the history of adult working-class education. London: Lawrence & Wishart.
- Lewis, Richard (1976). "The South Wales miners and the Ruskin College strike of 1909". LLafur. 2 (1): 57–72.
- Lewis, Richard (1984). "The Central Labour College: Its decline and fall, 1919-29". Welsh History Review/Cylchgrawn Hanes Cymru. 12 (1–4): 225–245.
- McIlroy, John (1996). "Independent working class education and trade union education and training". In Fieldhouse, Roger (ed.). A history of modern British adult education. Leicester: National Institute of Adult Continuing Education. pp. 264–289. ISBN 1-872941-66-4.
- Millar, James Primrose Malcolm (1979). The Labour College Movement. London: N.C.L.C. Publishing Society. ISBN 9780716350101.
- Phillips, Anne; Putnam, Tim (1980). "Education for emancipation: the movement for independent working class education 1908-1928". Capital & Class. 4 (1): 18–42. doi:10.1177/030981688001000103.
