= Independent Working Class Education =

Education geared to the needs of working class revolutionary emancipation

Independent Working Class Education is an approach to education, particularly adult education, developed by labour activists, whereby the education of working-class people is seen as a specifically political process linked to other aspects of class struggle. The term, abbreviated to IWCE, is particularly linked to the Plebs' League, the British educational and political organisation which was founded in 1908.

== Ruskin College ==
When Ruskin College was founded in Oxford in 1899, its founders Walter Vrooman and Charles A. Beard declared:

"We shall take men who have been merely condemning our social institution, and we will teach them how, instead, to transform those institutions, so that instead of talking against the world, they will begin methodically and scientifically to possess the world." (Note: Reprinted in Earsman 1920.)

== Proletcult (1921) ==
In their book Proletcult (Proletarian culture), English communist authors Eden Paul and his wife Cedar Paul addressed the question "What ... is the fundamental requirement of the modern working class?" Their response was: "to use the economic power of the workers for the overthrow of the capitalist system, the abolition of wagery and the inauguration of a classless commonwealth." They continued:

"Quite recently, during the last ten years or so, the workers' vanguard has come clearly to recognize that all other efforts will be mis-directed unless guided by knowledge. The workers' demand for education is no longer a demand for graduated doses of bourgeois culture. It is a demand for an education which shall make the workers understand their place in the economic and social system, and shall help them in the successful waging of the class war. It is a demand for Independent Working-Class Education." (Note: Wrigley 2006, p. 37 quoted the observation of Australian historian Stuart Macintyre that the two books of Paul and Paul, Creative revolution (1920) and Proletcult, attracted criticism from the labour colleges for "their obscure vocabulary ... and their generally school marmish tone" (MacIntyre 1980).)

Paul and Paul (1921) went on to identify the Plebs League as "the most effective exponent of the demand for a distinctively proletarian culture", whereas they described the Workers Educational Association, as making a "parade of impartiality" which masked an "unconscious bias in favour of the institutions of the bourgeois State". They drew inspiration from Proletkult, an organisation which was set up in the wake of the Russian Revolution. Envisioning an imminent revolution spreading to Great Britain, they saw the development of a fighting proletarian culture as being requisite for social revolution. They opined: "Proletcult is practically synonymous with what is generally known in this country by the cumbrous name of Independent Working-Class Education."

== Independent Working Class Education Network (ICWEN) ==
In 2013 Robert Turnbull announced the establishment of the Independent Working Class Education Network (ICWEN). He observed that the Plebs Journal, was a 'major vehicle' for promoting Independent Working Class Education. However, after it had been continued by the National Council of Labour Colleges (NCLC) and the NCLC was transferred to the Education Department of the Trades Union Congress (the TUC), he opined that its direction 'had somewhat altered'. He further opined: 'education has to be at the heart of the resistance to neoliberalism' and that it:

'has to begin in schools, in colleges and universities, but it also has to take place in the workplace, in the home - in short, wherever people feel marginalised and dispossessed.'

Turnbull then announced: 'The Independent Working Class Education Network (www.iwceducation.co.uk/) has been established to take forward this vision.'

The ICWEN has disclosed that it wants to 'to rebuild the tradition of independent working-class education (IWCE) that used to exist across many parts of England, Scotland and Wales.' As part of doing so, it hosts an archive of a selection of some of the past issues of the quarterly magazine Post-16 Educator.

== Institutions founded on the basis of IWCE ==
- Central Labour College, London
- Scottish Labour College, Glasgow
- Victorian Labour College, Australia

== Archive ==
- Working Class Movement Library
