= David Webster (broadcasting executive) =

British television producer and BBC executive (1931–2003)

- Born: 11 January 1931; Taunton, England
- Died: 6 August 2003 (aged 72); Washington, D.C., United States
- Occupations: Television producer and executive
- Employer: BBC
- Spouse: Elizabeth Drew
- Children: 2

David Webster (11 January 1931 – 6 August 2003) was a British television producer and senior executive at the BBC.

== Early life ==
Webster was born in Taunton, England, into a Quaker family noted for offering refuge to Nazi-era migrants. He attended Taunton School and, as a conscientious objector, completed national service at a hospital. He later studied politics at Ruskin College, Oxford. He joined the BBC in 1953 as a subeditor in the external services news department.

== BBC career ==
Webster became a producer on current affairs TV programme Panorama in 1959, working with prominent broadcasters like Paul Fox and Richard Dimbleby. In the following five years he proved to be an excellent visual storyteller and worked with journalist of name such as Robin Day, Robert Kee, Ludovic Kennedy, John Morgan, Michael Charlton, Michael Barratt, Richard Kershaw and Robert MacNeil. With Panorama Webster covered major events, including U.S. political conventions and an interview with President John F. Kennedy. He edited the programme from 1967 to 1969.

Webster later served as the BBC’s representative in the United States (1971–1976), controller of information services, and director of public affairs, holding a seat on the board of management for eight years. From 1981 to 1985 he was director, USA, based in New York.

== Later life and death ==
In 1988, Webster founded the Trans-Atlantic Dialogue on Broadcasting and the Information Society, which focussed on international cooperation on broadcasting policy. After the end of the Cold War, the organization helped develop independent broadcasting services and regulations in countries like Czech Republic, Poland, Romania, Hungary and Macedonia. He lived in Washington, D.C., where his home became a forum for political and media discussion. Webster died of heart failure on 6 August 2003 at his home in Washington, aged 72. He was survived by his wife, and two sons from his first marriage.
