= Peter Donaldson (economist) =

Peter Donaldson (27 October 1934 – 6 September 2002) was a British economist, academic, author, and radio and television broadcaster.

== Academic career ==
Born in Eccles, Lancashire, Donaldson's family moved to Gillingham, Kent, when he was only 18 months old. Following education at the local grammar school he gained a scholarship to read philosophy, politics and economics at Balliol College, Oxford. In 1957 he became a junior lecturer at the University of Leeds, before moving to the University of Leicester in 1960. In 1964 he took up a position at Osmania University in Hyderabad, India, where he stayed until 1967, except for a six-month stint back in the United Kingdom at Ruskin College in 1965. On completing his term in Hyderabad he returned to Ruskin College full-time and remained on staff there until his retirement in the early 1990s.

== Publishing and broadcasting career ==
During the course of his early academic career Donaldson became increasingly aware of the limited scope, poor standard, and inaccessibility of economics teaching at school and undergraduate level. In order to provide better teaching material, during his time at Leicester University he began to write what would, in 1965, be published as his first book: Guide to the British Economy. It was this work – which was to be republished in three further editions in 1967, 1971 and 1976 – that established his reputation as a populariser of economics. Soon after its publication the BBC approached Donaldson, and with the corporation he devised and presented Managing the Economy on BBC Radio 4 during the latter part of the 1960s.

Donaldson's time in India had stirred an interest in development economics, and this was reflected in his follow-up programme Affluence and Inequality which aired during the early 1970s, also on Radio 4. The series was accompanied by a book, Worlds Apart, which was based on the programme and dealt with similar subject matter. A number of further educational and popular books appeared during the late 1970s and early 1980s, before Donaldson returned to broadcasting with Yorkshire Television-produced programmes for ITV Schools and the newly launched Channel 4 television station. His shows 10 x Economics and A Question of Economics were popular with both the general public and teachers, and were widely used in economics classrooms. Both were accompanied by books of the same name.

== Selected bibliography ==
- Donaldson, Peter (1965). Guide to the British Economy. Penguin Books. p. 255.
- Donaldson, Peter (1971). Worlds Apart: The economic gulf between nations. British Broadcasting Corporation. p. 160. ISBN 0-563-10594-1.
- Donaldson, Peter (1973). Economics of the Real World. Penguin Books/British Broadcasting Corporation. p. 244. ISBN 0-14-021775-4.
- Donaldson, Peter; Clifford, Jim (1977). The Economy and Decision Making. Longman. p. 187. ISBN 0-582-35546-X.
- Donaldson, Peter (1982). 10 x Economics: A simple guide to the economics of the early eighties. Penguin Books. p. 192. ISBN 0-14-022161-1.
- Donaldson, Peter (1985). A Question of Economics. Penguin Books, in association with Channel 4 and Yorkshire Television. p. 236. ISBN 0-14-022618-4.
- Donaldson, Peter; Farquhar, James (1988). Understanding the British Economy. Penguin Books. p. 318. ISBN 0-14-022743-1.
