= William Craik (educationalist) =

William White Craik MC* (8 December 1881 – 1968) was a Scottish educationalist who was a promoter and practitioner of Independent working class education (IWCE). He participated in the strike at Ruskin College in 1909. Following the failure of the strike, he then played a major role alongside former carpenter George Sims in the use of the Plebs Magazine in advocating the foundation of the Central Labour College as an educational establishment which saw workers education as a political process.

Craik was born in Montrose, Forfarshire, to James Craik and Margaret White. He served as a 2nd Lt in the Border Regiment during WW1 and was awarded the Military Cross and Bar while fighting at Arras in late 1917. Later, Craik served in the army of occupation in Austria. He was demobilised in 1919.

In 1920, he was appointed principal of the Central Labour College.

After leaving the Central Labour College in the mid-1920s, Craik worked variously in adult education and after the war as a correspondent for the BBC and Tribune newspaper, which carried a lengthy obituary after his death.

By the 1960s, Craik was living in a North London council house at which a group composed of Communist Party officials, labour academics and New Left theorists gathered to honour him.
