= Mark Starr (labor educationalist) =

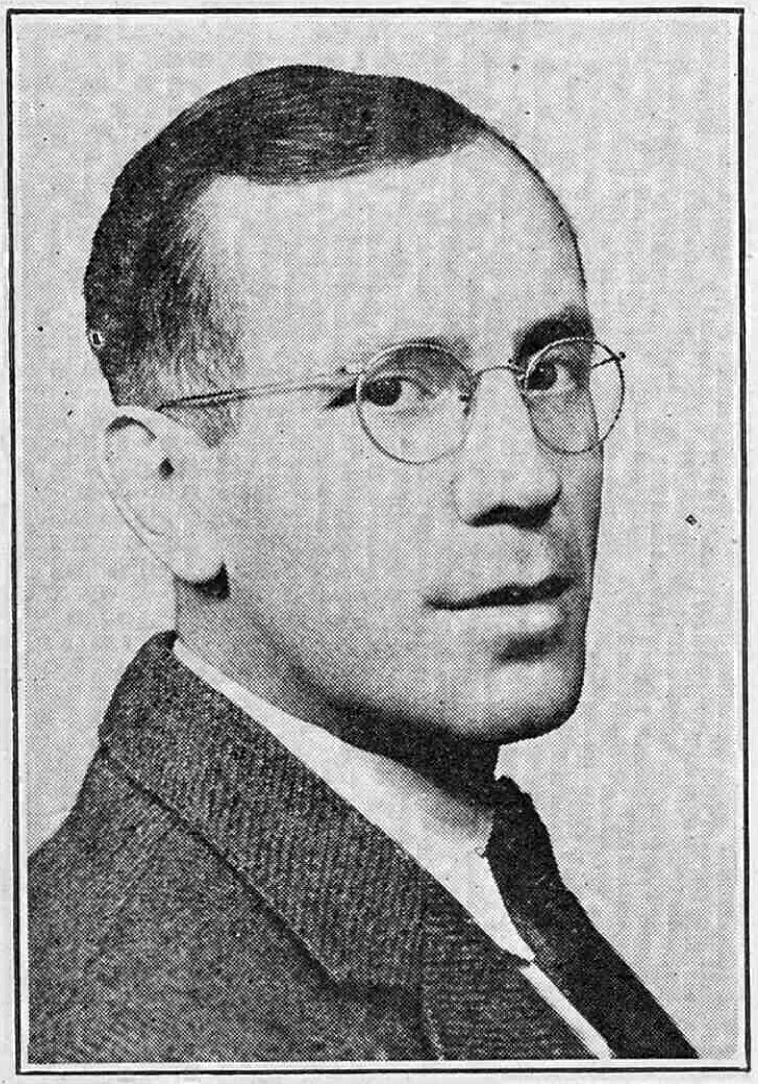
Starr c. 1936

Mark Starr (27 April 1894, Shoscombe – 24 April 1985, New York City) was a British-American labor historian and pedagogue. For 25 years he was educational director of the International Ladies Garment Workers Union.

Born in Shoscombe, Somerset he was the son of a staunch Free Methodist coal miner. From 1899 to 1907 he attended St Julian's National School. At age thirteen he began work in the mines, later migrating to South Wales. He joined the Miners' Federation of Great Britain and the Independent Labour Party and also attended classes arranged by the Workers Educational Association. In 1915 he won a scholarship to the Central Labour College in London, which helped broaden his intellectual horizons. In 1916 he returned to the coal fields and began teaching classes in industrial history under the auspices of the Aberdare District Miners' Federation. These lectures became the basis for his A Worker looks at History.

In 1918 he was called up to service in the army but became a conscientious objector on political grounds. While in prison his sister sent him a copy of the New Testament in Esperanto, which sparked a lifelong interest in the subject. Lobbying by his father got Starr transferred from prison to farm work in Northumberland. In Northumberland Starr came in contact with the Plebs League and became a leading member of that group.

After his release from prison he returned to South Wales and continued his educational work. In 1921 he helped organize the National Council of Labour Colleges and was the Plebs League representative on its council. During the 1920s, the Plebs League and the NCLC became increasingly divided over personal and political animosities. The Plebs were dominated by the Horrabin family: J. F. Horrabin edited Plebs magazine, his wife Winifred Horrabin was national secretary and his sister Kathleen was a clerk in the national office. Starr married Kathleen. The NCLC was dominated by J. P. M. Millar and his wife Christine. When the NCLC absorbed the Plebs in 1927 Starr began to find his position in the group untenable and immigrated to the United States to become an instructor at Brookwood Labor College in Katonah, New York. Though seen as an ally of the Horrabins, his marriage with Kathleen was deteriorating and ended with a divorce.

Along with the Horrabins, Starr briefly joined the Communist Party of Great Britain during the early 1920s, but soon left, unable to stomach the group's discipline. A trip to Leningrad in 1926 to attend an Esperanto conference further alienated him from the Soviets. He stood as a Labour Party candidate for Wimbledon in 1923 and 1924, obtaining about 30% of the vote each time.

In America, Starr continued as an instructor at Brookwood until 1935, when he became educational director of the powerful International Ladies' Garment Workers' Union, a position he kept until 1960. He became active in the American Labor Party and the Liberal Party of New York, both of which the ILGWU was affiliated with. He was chairmen of the Queens branch of the Liberal Party from 1945 to 1959. After retiring from ILGWU he represented the International Labour Organization in Singapore and East Africa and continued his Esperanto advocacy. He was listed as the chairman of the Esperanto Information Center in 1973 when he signed the Humanist Manifesto II.

In 1932 Starr married Helen Norton, also a lecturer at Brookwood. They had two children, John, who died in infancy, and Emily. Mark Starr died on 24 April 1985.

== Works ==
- A worker looks at history: being outlines of industrial history specially written for C.L.C.-Plebs classes London: Plebs League, 1917
- Trade unionism: past and future London: Plebs League, 1923
- Esperanto and Labour. London: The British League of Esperantist Socialists, July 1923 (published anonymously)
- A worker looks at economics London: Labour Pub. Co., 1925
- Lies and hate in education London, Hogarth press 1929
- British labor movement Katonah, N.Y.: Brookwood Labor College 1931
- The worker as a consumer -- how he is exploited, how he may protect himself Katonah, N.Y.: Brookwood labor publications 1936
- The eye route: visual aids, means and agencies, for workers' education New York: Education Dept., International Ladies' Garment Workers' Union, 1938
- Consumer education and labor New York: Education Dept., International Ladies' Garment Workers' Union, 1940
- Education, why and for what? New York: Education Dept., International Ladies' Garment Workers' Union, 1940
- Workers' education today New York City : League for Industrial Democracy, 1941
- Labor in America (with Harold Underwood Faulkner) New York; London: Harper & Bros., 1944
- Labor looks at education Cambridge, Harvard University Press, 1946
- Labour Politics in U.S.A London Fabian Publications, 1949
- Labor and the American way New York, Oxford Book Co., 1952
- "Creeping socialism" vs. limping capitalism New York: Union for Democratic Socialism, 1954
- Garment workers: "welfare unionism" New York: Education Dept., International Ladies' Garment Workers' Union, 1954
- Communication vs. Madison Avenue manipulations New York, n.p. 1958
- Seventh Avenue; road to improved labor-management relations. New York, Education Dept., International Ladies' Garment Workers's Union 1958
- A summary of Minnesota labor's first hundred years: a unit for labor education short-courses New York, n.p. 1960
