= Dennis Hird =

James Dennis Hird (28 January 1850 - 13 July 1920) was a British clergyman, educator and author.

Hird was born in Ashby, Lincolnshire (now part of Scunthorpe) to Robert and Fanny Dennis Hird née Kendall. He was the second of five sons, though only three survived to adulthood. In later life he became known by his middle name, Dennis, this being the maiden name of his maternal grandmother, Fanny Kendall. The Kendall family, who was well known in Ashby, was credited as the main instigators in bringing Primitive Methodism to the hamlet. Six of Dennis's maternal uncles were ordained ministers in this faith, along with a cousin, Holliday Bickerstaffe Kendall. The Hird family were also Methodists and well known in the hamlet. Robert Hird was a grocer and Hird Terrace (no longer standing) was once named after the family. Primitive Methodism was a big influence in Dennis's early life and may be the spark for his socialist tendencies, as it was more favoured by the working classes of the time.

== Ministry ==
Hird was educated at Oxford as a non-collegiate student, graduating BA in 1875 (MA in 1878).

In December 1884, Hird was ordained as a Church of England deacon and appointed to St Michael and All Angels, Bournemouth. Then a year later he was ordained as a priest and appointed curate of Christchurch, Battersea. Hird's talents and oratory skills were soon recognised and it was decided he could better serve the church in the role of General Secretary of the Church of England Temperance Society (C.E.T.S.) and London Police Court Mission for the Diocese of London, to which he was appointed in October 1887. When it was discovered that Hird was a member of the Social Democratic Federation in 1894, he was forced to resign from the Temperance Society. He was removed from London to become rector of Eastnor, Herefordshire.

== Educational activism ==
Hird was a member of the Socialist Educational Association, and in 1896 resigned his church. In 1899 he was chosen to be the first principal of Ruskin College, Oxford. The college's governing charter required the institution to show "neutrality in religion and politics", however, Hird, who was described as "a man of a forcible and attractive personality, ...known also to hold Nationalist and Socialist views of an advanced type" was found to be using the college for propagandist purposes and was dismissed from his post in 1909. His sacking from Ruskin led to a students' strike, and he became warden of the Central Labour College established by trade unions to provide independent working class education.

== Works ==
- The Guide to C.E.T.S. Work in the London Diocese. London: Church of England Temperance Society, 1890.
- Church of England Temperance Society, Junior Division. Health, Wealth and Temperance. Westminster: Church of England Temperance Society, 1890.
- Temperance Reader. London: Cassell, 1890.
- Toddle Island: Being the Diary of Lord Bottsford, London, 1894. (by Lord Bottsford, pseud. of James Dennis Hird).
- Wife-lending, How to Preserve the Poor, etc. London: Reeves, 1894. (by Walter James, pseud. of James Dennis Hird).
- A Christian With Two Wives. London: Watts, 1915.
- Pulpit Science: Is Immortality a Physical Fact? London: Wilson, 1897.
- In Search of a Religion. London: Wilson, 1897.
- Palaestra Oxoniensis : Palaestra Logica. Oxford, 1899. (with W. H. Forbes)
- Was Jesus Christ a Ritualist? London: Watts, 1900.
- The Believing Bishop. London, 1901. (by Havergall Bates, pseud. of James Dennis Hird)
- An Easy Outline of Evolution. London: Watts, 1903.
- A Picture Book of Evolution, vols. 1-2. London: Watts, 1906-07.
- From Brute to Brother. London: Clarion Press, 1908.
- Shear My Sheep. London: Fifield, 1908.
- Jesus the Socialist. London: Clarion Press, 1908.
