= A. J. Cook (trade unionist) =

British trade union leader (1883–1931)

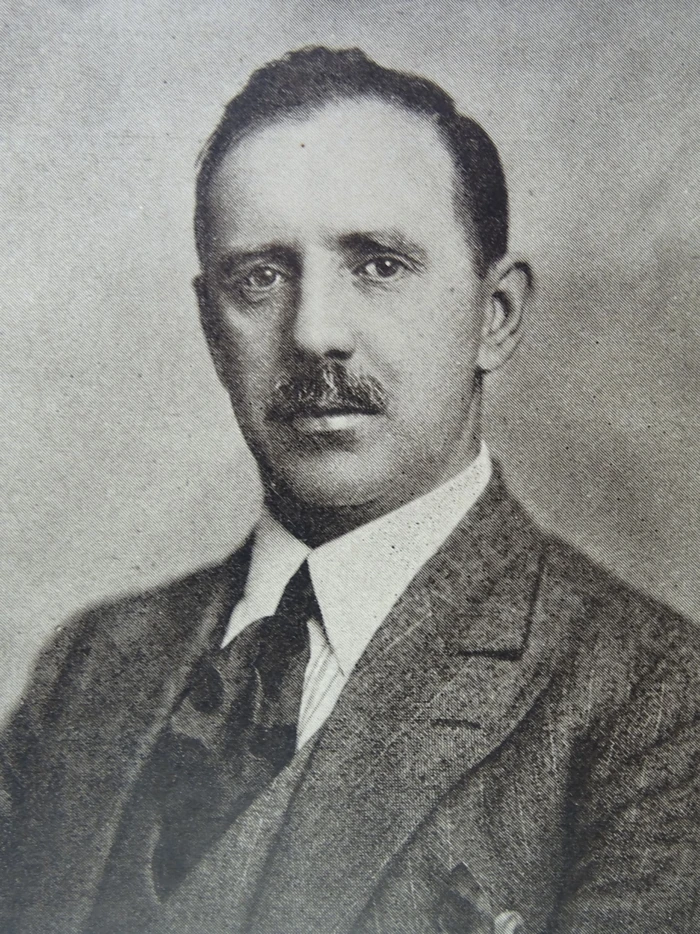
- 1926 self-portrait
- Born: Arthur James Cook; 22 November 1883; Wookey, Somerset, England
- Died: 2 November 1931 (aged 47); London, England
- Occupation: Trade union general secretary
- Years active: 1924–1931
- Spouse: Annie Edwards
- Parent(s): Thomas Cook (father) and Selina Cook (mother)
- A. J. Cook's voice Recorded 1920s

Arthur James Cook (22 November 1883 – 2 November 1931) was a British trade union leader who served as General Secretary of the Miners' Federation of Great Britain from 1924 until his death in 1931. He became one of the most prominent and controversial figures in the British labour movement during the 1920s, known for his passionate oratory and militant approach to industrial relations.

Born in Wookey, Somerset, Cook moved to South Wales at age 18 to work in the coal mines. He quickly became involved in trade union activities and socialist politics, transitioning from Baptist preacher to radical labour organiser. Cook played a key role in developing the syndicalist philosophy outlined in "The Miners' Next Step" (1912) and was instrumental in the Cambrian Combine disputes that transformed industrial relations in the Welsh coalfields.

As General Secretary, Cook became closely associated with the defiant slogan "Not a penny off the pay, not a minute on the day" during the 1926 General Strike. When the Trades Union Congress abandoned the general strike after nine days, Cook continued to lead the miners' resistance for several months, though the strike ultimately ended in defeat. His uncompromising stance and revolutionary rhetoric made him a controversial figure, with critics labelling him a "raving Communist" while supporters saw him as a champion of workers' rights.

Cook's health declined following the 1926 strike, particularly due to a leg injury that worsened over several years. After his right leg was amputated in January 1931, Cook returned to work within six weeks and continued his duties until his death at Manor House Hospital on 2 November 1931, aged 47. His career represents both the potential and limitations of militant trade unionism during the interwar period in Britain.

== Biography ==
=== Early years ===
A. J. Cook was born to Thomas Cook, a serving soldier, and Selina Cook (née Brock), a self-employed dressmaker and devout Baptist, in Wookey, Somerset. Cook spent the early part of his life in the West Country. Cook later described his childhood as a troubled one, which included both a poor relationship with his family as well as a struggle in school. He had a particularly poor relationship with his father, which worsened with the arrival of additional siblings, leading his mother Selina to seek employment for her son to ease family tensions.

After leaving elementary school, Cook worked as a farm labourer. At the age of twelve, he took up employment as a labourer on the farm of Caleb Durbin, a local farmer and fellow Baptist, taking up residence with his employer to rise early enough for cow milking. Inspired by his Baptist faith and with the encouragement of his mother and Durbin, Cook became a noted boy preacher within Somerset. By age 17, he was preaching with the Baptists, and his preaching had garnered such attention that in 1901, he was offered a place at a Baptist college to train for the Ministry.

=== Move to Wales and early career ===
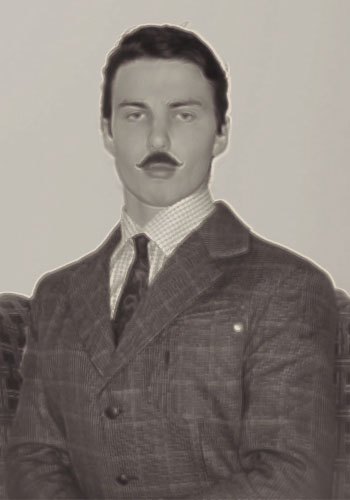
A.J. Cook in 1906

At the age of 18, having "saved up £5 and a box filled with sermons", Cook moved to Porth in South Wales, and later to Merthyr Tydfil, to find work in the coal mines as part of a mass migration of disaffected farm-workers from the Southwest of England seeking better wages. He began work at the Lewis Merthyr Colliery in Trehafod and was also a lay preacher in the local Baptist chapel. However, his developing extreme socialist views led to his severing relations with his religious denomination.

=== Personal life ===
Cook married Annie Edwards, and with £100 in his savings, he was able to furnish a small house in Porth. He later attended the Labour College in London, where he developed his political and economic understanding, and subsequently conducted economics classes in the Rhondda.

=== Political career ===
In this mining town Cook first became involved in politics, committing active service to the Independent Labour Party (ILP). He came to prominence in the Cambrian Combine strike of 1910 and went on to active involvement in the Miners' Unofficial Reform Committee which published the syndicalist pamphlet 'The Miners' Next Step' in 1912. The pamphlet argued that the left needed to organise from below to gain control of the leadership of the union and exposed the treacherous role which union leaders had played in struggles with coal-owners.

=== World War I and anti-war activities ===
Cook's response to World War I was initially cautious, as he did not openly condemn British participation in the early months of 1914, unlike some other militants. However, his activities during the war focused on mitigating its adverse effects on working-class families. By October 1914, Cook was the leading figure in the Porth Relief Committee, established to deal with hardship amongst the community. Writing in the Porth Gazette, he expressed concern for soldiers' families while criticising government priorities.

Cook faced personal difficulties during this period when the Hafod management dismissed him in August 1914, giving him fourteen days' notice to quit his company house in what was seen as blatant victimisation. The threat of strike action by Lewis-Merthyr miners, who unanimously resolved to protect Cook as "a very active member of his trade union", persuaded the company to reverse their decision.

From 1916 onwards, Cook's activities attracted the attention of local police and Home Office intelligence, with Captain Lionel Lindsay and Deputy Chief Constable John Williams conducting extensive surveillance. Police engaged shorthand writers and plain-clothes officers to record his meetings. Cook became increasingly vocal in his opposition to the war, declaring in April 1916: "As a worker I have more regard for the interests of my class than any nation. The interests of my class are not benefitted by this war, hence my opposition."

By 1917, Cook was deeply involved in the anti-war movement that grew following the Russian Revolution. He attended the Leeds Convention in June 1917 and was involved in meetings calling for "an immediate conference of the belligerents to negotiate an immediate cessation of hostilities". At these meetings, Cook declared himself "an internationalist" and stated: "To hell with everybody bar my class. To me, the hand of the German and Austrian is the same as the hand of my fellow-workmen at home."

Cook also played a leading role in the expansion of Central Labour College classes in South Wales, teaching economics at Ynyshir and industrial history and economics at Ynysybwl and Taffs Well. These classes, which grew from nineteen to forty-one between March and December 1917, were viewed with suspicion by authorities.

Towards the end of 1917, Cook began touring the Rhondda with George Dolling, conducting debates on food rationing that served as "surreptitious outlets for revolutionary propaganda". In March 1918, Cook was charged on six counts under the Defence of the Realm Act. He was sentenced to three months' imprisonment. During his trial, correspondence revealed that Cook was "a very active member of the CPGB". The prosecution of Cook sparked threats of strike action, with mass meetings of miners resolving to strike if the summonses were not annulled.

=== Post-war political development ===
Following his imprisonment, Cook emerged as a hero to many miners, "a man who had gone to jail for his beliefs". An editorial in the Porth Gazette praised his "inspiring personality and almost fanatical zeal of the true reformer", noting his "devotion to the workers, or what he call 'his class'".

In March 1919, Cook was elected to the Rhondda District Council, where he made a sensational impact. At his first meeting, he condemned proposals for a peace celebration, arguing there was "no peace" while "armies of occupation were in Ireland and India 'crushing our comrades'". Despite initial criticism of his "occasional outburst of quite uncalled-for and futile belligerency", the Porth Gazette later praised his work on education and housing matters.

A more significant development came in 1919 when Cook was elected as a miners' agent for the Rhondda No. 1 District of the SWMF. In a remarkable electoral success, Cook defeated Noah Rees in the final vote by 18,230 to 17,531, despite most Lewis-Merthyr men being unable to vote as they belonged to a different district. At the beginning of 1920, Cook left the coal-face where he had worked since arriving in the Rhondda, taking up his new position with "youth, virility, strong convictions, and a good deal of push".

In September 1920 he became a founding member of the short-lived Communist Party of South Wales and the West of England, which had emerged from South Wales Socialist Society sharing a similar rejection of parliamentarism as the Communist Party (British Section of the Third International) which held its third conference in Cardiff in December 1920.

=== The 1921 lockout ===
In early 1921, Cook was selected to be the South Wales Miners' Federation (SWMF) representative on the executive of the Miners' Federation of Great Britain (MFGB). During the 1921 lockout, Cook's home was raided by police while he was away, with officers seizing "a large quantity of correspondence". His twelve-year-old son was frightened when the windows of their house in Porth were smashed during the night.

Cook was again charged, this time with inciting to intimidate a safety worker and unlawful assembly. Despite denying the statements attributed to him and claiming he had opposed the withdrawal of safety workers, he was found guilty and sentenced to two months' hard labour. Arthur Horner later recalled the humiliating experience of being chained together with Cook and other miners while being transported between prisons.

The defeat of the 1921 lockout marked a significant shift in Cook's political philosophy. By this time, he was advocating for nationalisation rather than the purely syndicalist approach of "encroaching control", telling miners that "it will be impossible to get peace with the mining industry under private ownership". This pragmatic evolution reflected his recognition that the syndicalist tactic had been "discredited by the consequences of economic depression in 1921".

Cook's leadership during the 1921 dispute was criticised by left-wing elements, leading to his resignation from the Communist Party in July 1921. He informed the Porth Branch that he was "definitely resigning his membership of the Communist Party 'because the Party wanted weeding, at present there were too many undesirables, as it were, within its ranks'". Despite this resignation, Cook never rejoined the party, though he maintained close ties with Communist activists throughout his career. In 1924 the Miners' Minority Movement was able to force Frank Hodges to resign his union office, and thus an election was held to determine the next leader of the movement. The South Wales Miners' Federation nominated A. J. Cook to replace him, and he beat Joseph Jones for the post by 217,664 votes to 202,297. Cook was then 39 years old.

On learning of his election, Trades Union Congress general secretary Fred Bramley exploded in outrage against Cook's election, labelling him a "raving Communist". Nevertheless, Cook served as General Secretary of the Miners' Federation of Great Britain from 1924 until 1931, a period that included the 1926 General Strike. He was also elected as secretary of the International Miners' Federation.

=== Cook's campaign and the road to 1926 ===
Cook's rise to national prominence was significantly enhanced by his intensive speaking campaign throughout 1925, which Robin Page Arnot termed "Cook's Campaign". Speaking at mass meetings across the British coalfields, Cook drew crowds of up to 80,000 people, making these gatherings major social events in the miners' calendar. His oratorical style was unique: he would remove his jacket, tie, collar and hat, and move around the platform to address different sections of the crowd, lacking any sound amplification.

Arthur Horner, who shared many platforms with Cook, observed that while he himself would "make a good, logical speech", Cook would "electrify the meeting" because "he was speaking for the meeting" rather than to it, expressing "the thoughts of his audience" and serving as "the burning expression of their anger at the iniquities which they were suffering". Cook's campaign was instrumental in building the morale and fighting strength of mining communities during this critical period.

=== The 1926 General Strike ===
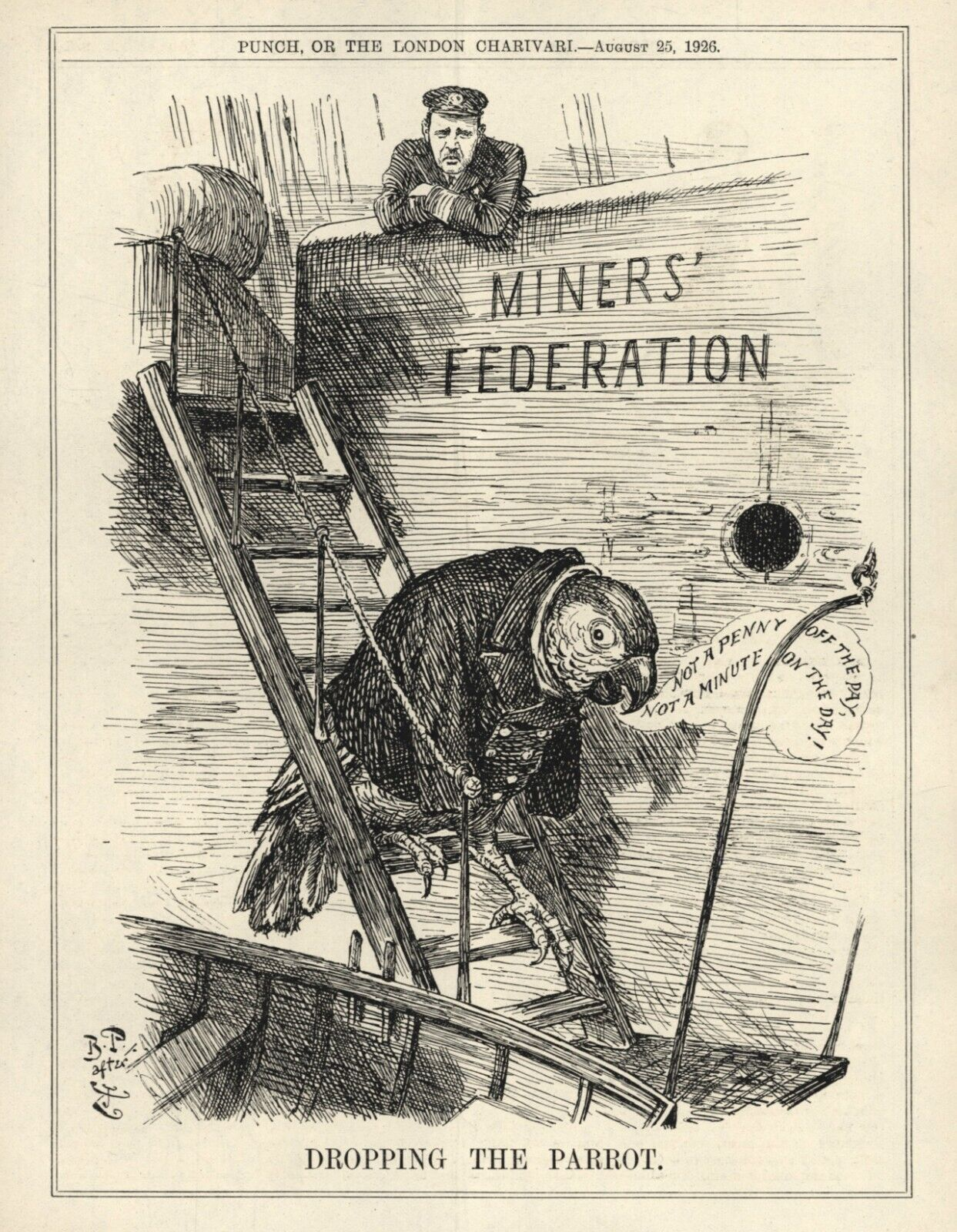
Political cartoon 'Dropping the Parrot' by Bernard Partridge. A parrot in a pilot's uniform is observed by A.J. Cook, whose slogan "Not a penny off the pay, not a minute on the day!" the parrot utters.

When mine owners announced their intention to reduce miners' wages in 1926, the Miners' Federation of Great Britain rejected the terms outright. Cook became closely associated with the defiant slogan, "Not a penny off the pay, not a minute on the day", which became the rallying cry of the striking miners.

The General Strike lasted nine days, from 4 to 12 May 1926. It was called by the General Council of the Trades Union Congress (TUC) in an unsuccessful attempt to force the British government to act to prevent wage reductions and worsening conditions for 1.2 million locked-out coal miners. When the TUC abandoned the general strike, Cook urged the miners to continue their resistance. The miners maintained their strike for several months after the TUC's withdrawal, with Cook providing continued leadership during this extended period of industrial action.

About the strike, Cook wrote the pamphlet "The Nine Days" in 1926, providing his perspective on the events and the miners' struggle. The strike ultimately failed, and by the end of November 1926, most miners were forced by economic necessity to return to work under the employers' terms.

=== Later political activities ===
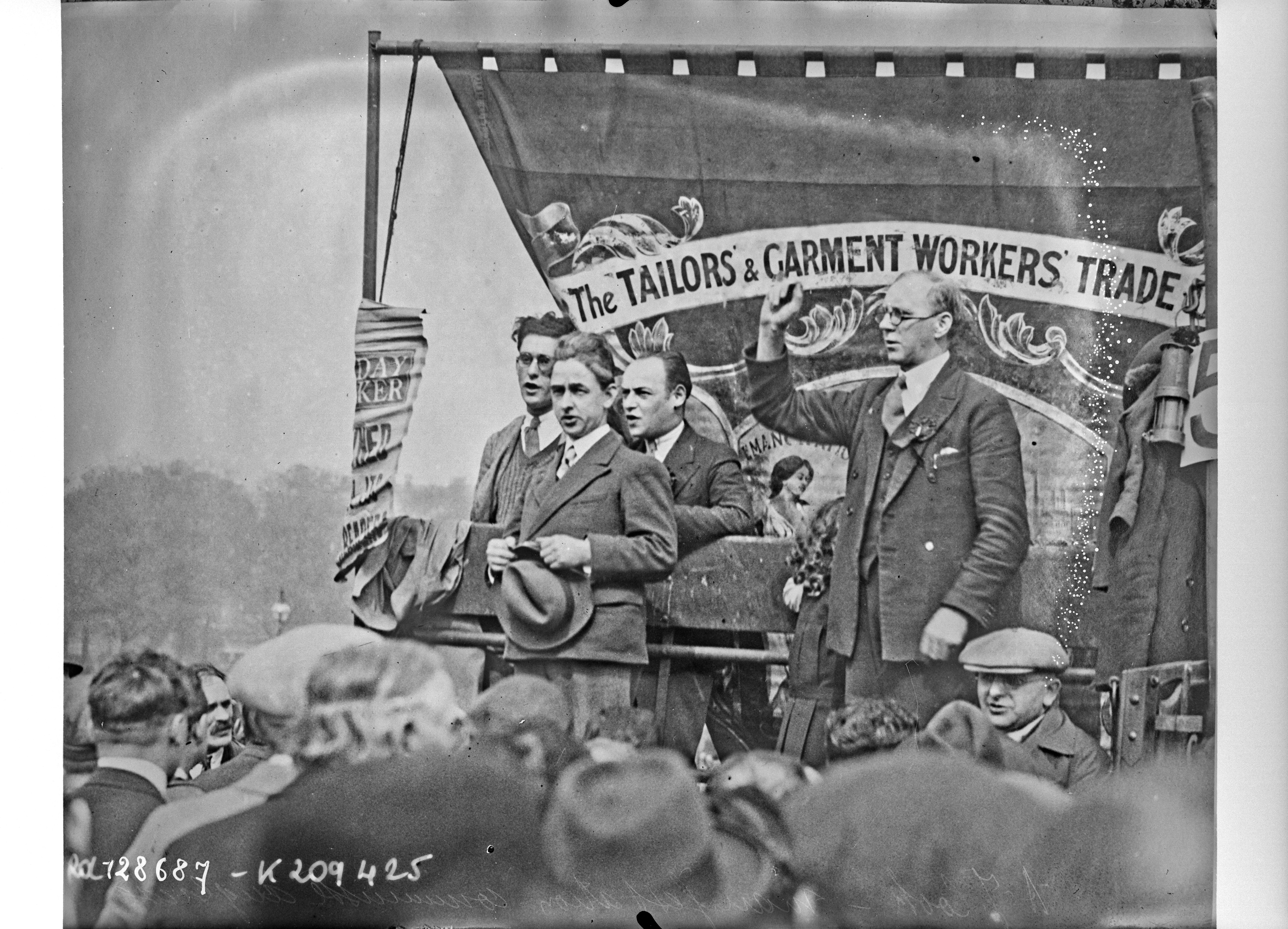
Communist demonstration with A.J. Cook being the farthest right

Although a member of the Independent Labour Party, Cook worked closely with the Communist Party after its formation in 1920 and with the National Minority Movement from 1924 to 1929. Later in his life, he continued to call himself "a humble disciple of Lenin". Arthur Horner, a leading South Wales Communist and mining militant, described Cook's tenure as General Secretary as "a time for new ideas — an agitator, a man with a sense of adventure".

=== Final illness and death ===
==== Health decline and continued political activity ====
Cook's health declined significantly after 1926. According to Davies, he never fully recovered from the strain he experienced during that period, suffering from fatigue, nervous exhaustion and hoarseness. His most serious medical condition was a leg injury that had been present since the 1920s. Cook declined medical treatment for several years, and his condition continued to worsen.

Despite his declining health, Cook remained politically active during 1930-31. He opposed the Communist Party of Great Britain's formation of breakaway unions, stating: "I warn all mineworkers in Britain and in Scotland against this move of the Communist Party, which cannot succeed because the workers of Britain will not allow it." Cook also supported Oswald Mosley's economic proposals for addressing mass unemployment, signing the Mosley Memorandum in December 1930, though his illness restricted his political activities.

With unemployment exceeding two million by December 1930, Cook advocated for a Labour government, telling audiences: "It is the bounden duty of all of us to put on one side disagreements or personal differences and work for a majority Labour government."

==== Hospitalisation and amputation ====
On 1 January 1931, the South Wales Miners' Federation commenced strike action. Cook's medical condition had deteriorated significantly, with his leg injury causing severe pain. He agreed to hospital treatment and was admitted to Manor House Hospital in Golders Green on 9 January 1931.

Upon admission, Cook wrote to Prime Minister Ramsay MacDonald expressing criticism of the Labour government's approach to the miners' situation: "I am terribly disappointed at the shabby way our men have been treated in the face of the attacks of the coal owners especially in South Wales... we are left to battle alone against the most vicious set of capitalists existing in this country." MacDonald responded that he was "getting sick and tired of the way that some of you get your men into difficulties and then turn to the government" for assistance.

Cook underwent amputation of his right leg above the knee on 19 January 1931. Medical reports indicated he tolerated the procedure well, though he expressed concern that his disability might affect his ability to continue as General Secretary. The Miners' Federation of Great Britain Executive meeting of 28 January noted that Cook "was recovering well from the operation and was most cheerful in the circumstances".

==== Return to work and final months ====
Cook returned to work within six weeks of his operation, using a prosthetic leg and crutches. To facilitate his continued duties, Cook purchased a motor vehicle, with the MFGB Executive agreeing to cover the cost and providing £75 annually for a chauffeur. The Executive advised Cook to take an extended period of recuperation, but he declined and resumed his full workload.

On 19 March 1931, Cook attended an important MFGB conference addressing hours and wages, with delegates aware that Stanley Baldwin's Eight Hours Act would expire in July, automatically reverting to a seven-hour working day. Cook informed delegates that "wages cannot be increased by a reduction in hours... Our hopes of three months have been in vain." Observers noted that his recovery from the operation remained incomplete, and he subsequently took the delayed period of rest.

Cook's health continued to decline during his final months. According to Davies, his condition following the 1926 events had not improved, and his leg injury remained a source of ongoing medical complications. In his final months, Davies observed that Cook appeared to recognise the severity of his condition.

Cook died at Manor House Hospital on 2 November 1931, aged 47.

== Legacy and impact ==
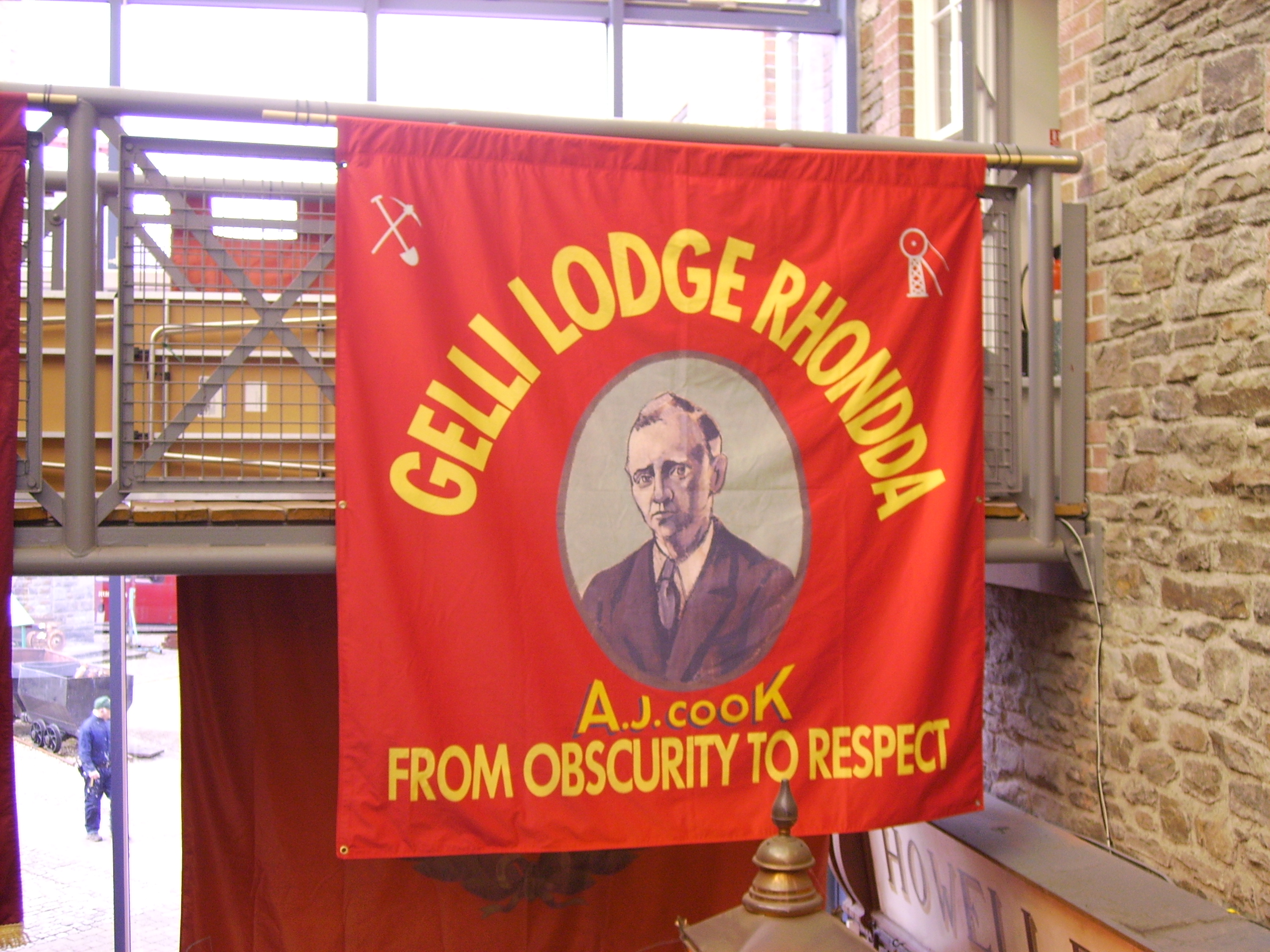
Gelli lodge banner of A.J. Cook held at the Rhondda Heritage Park

Arthur James Cook is remembered as one of the United Kingdom's most prominent miners' leaders and a key figure in the British labour movement of the 1920s. His passionate oratory and unwavering commitment to workers' rights made him a symbol of the miners' determined struggle against wage reductions and deteriorating working conditions. Cook's famous slogan "Not a penny off the pay, not a minute on the day" became a defining phrase of industrial resistance and continues to be associated with British trade union militancy.

Cook's political evolution from Baptist preacher to syndicalist militant reflects the broader radicalisation of the British working class during the early 20th century. His involvement in producing "The Miners' Next Step" helped establish a syndicalist tradition that sought to transform trade unions from below, challenging both capitalist ownership and moderate union leadership. This approach influenced subsequent generations of labour activists and contributed to the development of left-wing politics in Britain.

Despite the ultimate failure of the 1926 General Strike, Cook's leadership during the crisis demonstrated the potential for mass industrial action to challenge government policy. His decision to continue the miners' strike after the Trades Union Congress withdrew support, though ultimately unsuccessful, established him as a figure willing to pursue workers' interests even in the face of overwhelming opposition.

Cook's legacy extends beyond the immediate context of the 1920s labour struggles. His career embodies the tension between revolutionary aspirations and practical trade union leadership, a dynamic that continues to influence debates within the British labour movement. Modern trade union leaders and labour historians continue to study Cook's methods and assess his contribution to the development of industrial relations in Britain.

== Writings and publications ==
Cook was a prolific writer and pamphleteer who used his literary skills to advance the miners' cause and promote syndicalist ideas. His major works include:

- The Miners' Next Step (1912) – Co-authored pamphlet published by the Miners' Unofficial Reform Committee, which became a landmark in trade union literature and promoted syndicalist principles.
- The Nine Days (1926) – Cook's personal account of the 1926 General Strike, published by Co-operative Printing Society.
- "A.J. Cook Tells His Own Story," serialised in Tit-Bits, April and May 1926 – Autobiographical articles providing insight into his early life and political development.

In addition to these major works, Cook contributed numerous articles to labour publications and delivered speeches that were widely reported in the socialist press. His economics classes in the Rhondda also demonstrated his commitment to worker education and political consciousness-raising.

== Bibliography ==
- Davies, Paul (1987). A. J. Cook. Lives of the Left. Manchester: Manchester University Press. ISBN 978-0-7190-2160-2.

== Footnotes ==
Trade union offices
Preceded by Arthur Horner	Checkweighman at Mardy Colliery; 1919–1920	Succeeded by Bryn Roberts
Preceded by William John	Agent for the Rhondda District of the South Wales Miners' Federation; 1919–1922; With: William John (1919–1920); David Lewis (1920–1922)	Succeeded by David Lewis and William Mainwaring
Preceded by Frank Hodges	General Secretary of the Miners' Federation of Great Britain; 1924–1931	Succeeded by Ebby Edwards
