= National Council of Labour Colleges =

The National Council of Labour Colleges (NCLC) was an organisation set up in the United Kingdom to foster independent working class education.

The organisation was founded at a convention held in the Clarion Club House, Yardley, Birmingham on 8/9 October 1921. Its role was to act as a co-ordinating body for the movement of labour colleges, including the Central Labour College.

The National Council of Labour Colleges absorbed the Plebs League the year after the 1926 United Kingdom general strike, and continued to publish the Plebs' Magazine.

The NCLC offered educational schemes to such organisations as the National Clarion Cycling Club, in which they offered:

- Free access to NCLC classes
- Free access to non-residential day schools
- Occasional lectures provided at meetings
- Free NCLC correspondence courses for which the NCLC ran adverts on the inside back cover of The Clarion Cyclist.

In 1964, the NCLC merged with the Workers' Educational Trade Union Committee to form the Trades Union Congress Education Department.
