= Charles Craik =

American chemist

Charles S. Craik is an American chemist, currently at University of California, San Francisco and an Elected Fellow of the American Academy of Arts and Sciences.
