= Working-class education =

Working-class education is the education of working-class people.

== History ==
Prior to the 19th century, education for most members of society was elementary and only an elite received advanced education. This was intended to provide members of each social class with an education befitting their expected future status—toil or leadership.

Children of the working class have a different educational experience than children of the middle and upper classes. Because of this, working-class children can start out life at a disadvantage. Their educational experience may be hindered for several reasons, including influences from their parents, the schools they attend, and their expectations and attitudes, all of which are strongly affected by previous generations.

The interaction between low class learning and more high class used to be identified and only available for the people who weren't of low class. The treatment among the two each was very different and only taken seriously if they were known as being superior. The classrooms were used to make the children from low classes believe that, because they come from low standards they weren't as good as their peers. Children who went to school for education weren't coming out with the proper variety they needed to be successful. The higher class was known as elite and their education was advanced and gifted. They were in charge scholastically and anyone under them was not receiving the same social or academic opportunity. Overall education has been used to keep the social order and academic order for the superior or elite students rather than all students.

== Schools ==
The schools in the lower-income districts are characterized by overcrowding and lack of resources. This is because the funding of American public schools comes mostly from their district's property taxes. Residential segregation occurs when people segregate themselves based on class and race. This leaves schools in the low income school districts with little because those who are capable of paying higher property taxes move to districts where there are higher taxes and schools are receiving more. For example, in New York City, where efforts are being made to level the playing field, students in the wealthiest school districts are given almost twice as much as students in the poorest district, an annual amount of $13,974 compared to $7,457. When schools lack funding, programs such as special education classes and extracurricular activities are cut back. This causes some working-class children to not get the attention and help they require. When schools and teachers are not receiving the goods required to fulfill their duty, students cannot be expected to display the motivation to learn in a flawed system.

== Parental influences ==
The way parents act in the home and raise their children has a large effect on how children will interact in social institutions. Many social scientists claim that middle class parents practice concerted cultivation, meaning a child's life is filled with organized activities and social interactions with adults. Due to the extent of their interactions outside of the home, the children of concerted cultivation develop a greater mastery of language and are instilled with a sense of entitlement, both of which allows them to become more comfortable when interacting with institutions. On the other hand, many working-class parents practice the accomplishment of natural growth, where children have more control over their free time and are exposed to fewer interactions with adults that are outside of the home. These children are usually left to occupy themselves with activities such as watching TV, playing video games, or playing outside. Working-class parents put less emphasis on planned activities, than their middle class counterparts, because they are less likely to have the funds to pay for them.

The problem that comes with these differences in parenting practices is that schools, along with other institutions, are more harmonious with concerted cultivation, the parenting practice of the middle class. Teachers want parents and children to engage and be proactive, but parents and children of the working class feel a sense of constraint that leaves them confused on how to "work the system" and often causes them to become hostile towards schooling. Because working-class parents are often uncomfortable around authority figures, they are less likely to communicate with their child's teacher or become involved in the school. As a result of this, low income school districts have lower involvement in parent teacher conferences. This could also be attributed to the fact that working-class parents often have to hold down more than one job and do not have very much time to help their children with homework or attend school functions. As a consequence, working-class children mature in narrow social settings, receive fewer resources, and feel less entitlement.

== Attitudes ==
The children of the working class approach school with a different attitude than those of higher class. This is because their sense of entitlement is lower than that of their middle class counterparts. Working-class students sometimes feel unentitled or that they do not belong in affluent high schools or colleges. Instead of viewing education as a way up in the world, the working class views it as valuable but not as a reality for them. For working-class parents, they are more consumed with the tasks of simply getting by and providing for their children than they are with good grades and higher education. Parents pass this survival mentality onto their children and cause a cycle where working-class children do not have the same aspirations instilled in them that the middle class does. Only 54% of students whose parents only received their high school diploma go on to pursue their bachelor's degree. This statistic is compared to the 82% of students whose parents received their bachelor's degree that go on to college. First generation students who do go to college experience a culture shock once they get there because they are not as comfortable and sure of themselves as those that have come from a family that has received higher education. A 2012 review of the literature has shown that working-class students have a greater risk of being excluded from social life at universities, including formal activities such as campus-based clubs, societies, and organizations and informal activities such as parties and nonclassroom conversations. This is an important problem because social integration predicts student retention, and working-class students are twice as likely as middle class students to drop out before their second year of college because they lack the persistence they need to face challenges and succeed in college.

The attitude of children born into the working class strongly reflects the way their parents raise them. The outlook and importance of education is not the same as families with wealth. Inheritance plays a strong role in the way parents and children view and value education.

== Solving the problem ==
There are some ways that this may be changed. In order to break this cycle, working-class students might be taught the values of the middle class or the schooling system develop programs that help those students that are not receiving the support and guidance they need from home. The middle class values are the same values that are felt by the authority figures at school; therefore, through teaching working-class students to value education and be more involved they will be able to navigate social institutions with greater purpose and poise. The problem could be that working-class parents did not have these values instilled in them; therefore, they are less likely to pass these values on to their children. Schools have been left with the responsibility of being the only places for some children to learn the rules and values that are present in most institutions.

Solving the problem of racism within these institutions, causing perpetual problems and nearly impossible change, would take large steps towards rectifying problems within the education system. As long as institutionalized racism exists, problems within the educational system will continue to exist.

Due to the lack of resources in needy schools, educational facilities are forced to develop support systems that do not have any additional costs. Programs that have been introduced into lower income schools include the following:

- A specified amount of time set aside every day for homework can help the child better understand. Often working-class parents have neither the time nor the knowledge to help their children with their homework. By providing time for homework during the school day, students who are not receiving the help they need at home are able to receive supplemental instruction.
- Keeping the same teachers for a few years or having separate schools within schools can strengthen relationships. This program allows children and parents to become more familiar with teachers and to form stronger bonds. By strengthening the student and teacher relationship, students are able to receive more guidance from their teachers and grow more comfortable, which may be a lacking opportunity in the home.
- The setting of daily goals can help children learn how to face challenges and deadlines. By setting the goals in writing at the beginning of every day or week, children learn how to manage and prioritize tasks in order to feel a sense of achievement when the goals are met.

== See also ==
- Economic inequality
- Education in the United States
- Educational attainment in the United States
- Educational inequality
- Outliers
- Working class culture
