= Ruskin College =

Educational institution in Oxford, England

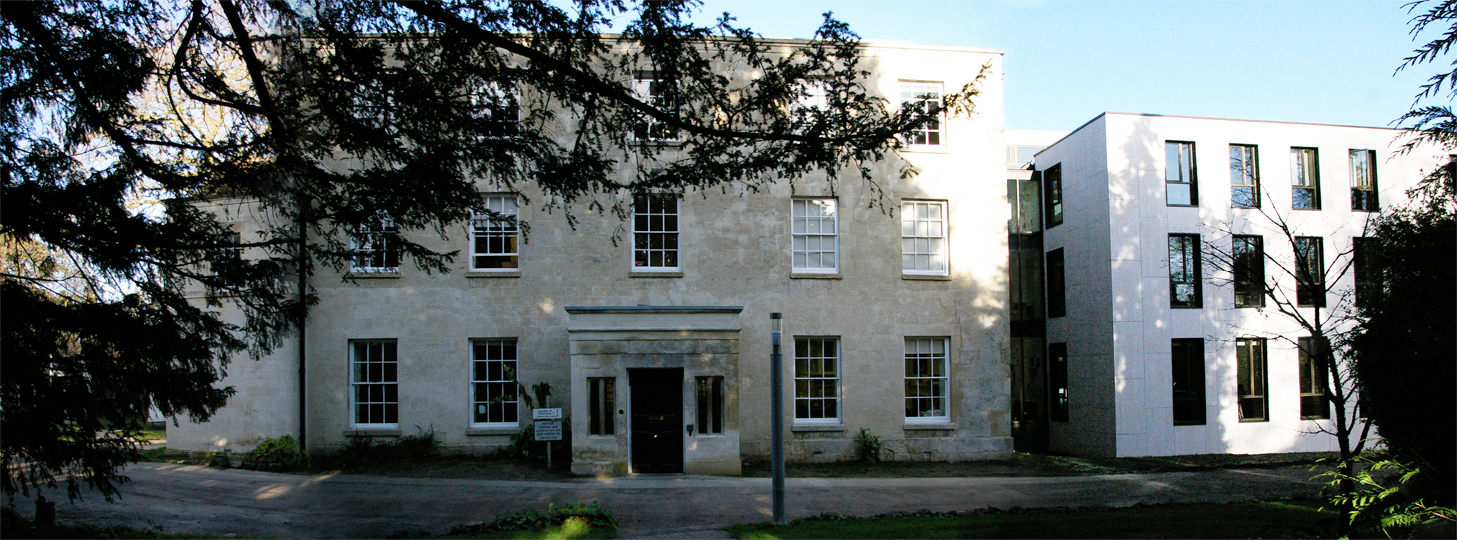
- Ruskin's Rookery building which is now the Ruskin College Academic Building
- Motto: "Learning to make a difference"
- Established: 1899; 127 years ago
- Principal: Peter John
- Location: Dunstan Road, Old Headington, Oxfordshire, England
- Website: www.ruskin.ac.uk

Ruskin College, originally known as Ruskin Hall, Oxford, is a higher education institution and part of the University of West London, in Oxford, England. It is not a college of the University of Oxford.

Named after the essayist, art and social critic John Ruskin, it specialises in providing educational opportunities for adults with few or no qualifications.

Degrees taught at Ruskin were formerly awarded by The Open University. The college joined the University of West London in 2021.

== History ==
Part of the 1901 class of students at Ruskin Hall, Oxford (Ruskin College)

Ruskin Hall, Oxford, was established in 1899 to provide education for working-class men who could not access university. It was founded by Americans Charles A. Beard and Walter Vrooman, both of whom had studied at the University of Oxford. Vrooman's wife, Amne (née Grafflin), an heiress, financially supported the foundation of the college.

The school was envisioned as a mechanism by which "working-class reformers" could "educate themselves efficiently at nominal cost." Tuition, lodging, and board was priced at 12s 6d (£0.625) per week, with a parallel correspondence course alternatively offered for 1 shilling (£0.05) per week plus a 1 shilling entrance fee. Courses were offered in political economy, sociology, the history of the labour movement, principles of politics, English literature, psychology, and other related aspects of the social sciences.

The school was administered by a General Council, which included elected representatives from the Parliamentary Committee of the Trades Union Congress and the Central Board of the Cooperative Union. An auxiliary organisation of supporters of the school was launched in 1901, the Ruskin Hall Educational League, which arranged conferences and public lectures in conjunction with the activities of the school.

=== 20th century ===
In October 1907, Arthur Smith of Balliol College paid a visit to Ruskin College on behalf of some of his university colleagues. He broached the idea of bringing Ruskin closer to the University, suggesting that this would involve the University providing funds for the College, and allowing Ruskin students to join the University. The majority of Ruskin students were suspicious that the proposal would lead to the erosion of the college's independence. Following a visit from Lord Curzon, the proposal was repeated and Dennis Hird, a lecturer in Sociology and Logic, responded that as far as the students were concerned Ruskin College was irrevocably part of the Labour movement.

In 1908, a group of Ruskin students, dissatisfied with its education policy which they viewed as too pro-establishment and imbued with elements of "social control", formed the Plebs' League. The students' revolt was supported by the Principal, Dennis Hird, and following his dismissal the students took strike action, refusing to attend lectures.

During the First World War, some of the two hundred Belgian refugees who came to Oxford were lodged in the college.

In 1970, Ruskin College hosted the UK's first National Women's Liberation Conference. The conference ran from 27 February to 1 March with between 500 and 600 people attending. The Guardian called the conference the "[one of the] biggest landmarks in British women's history". The conference organisers included Ruskin students Arielle Aberson and Sally Alexander, and historian Sheila Rowbotham. The organisers were associated with the History Workshop seminars held at the college and the conference was initially intended to focus on women's history.

Ruskin College was a secular sister-school to and a model for the Roman Catholic-linked Plater College until Plater's closing in 2005.

=== 2012 relocation ===
A £17-million redevelopment programme of the college's Old Headington site was completed in 2012, and the headquarters of the college moved there from the more central original site in Walton Street, which was sold to Exeter College, Oxford. The redeveloped site has a new academic building incorporating an expanded library, named the Callaghan Library in honour of former Labour Prime Minister James Callaghan, who made a major education speech at Ruskin in 1976. The MacColl–Seeger archive has a dedicated room within the new library. All other buildings on the site have been refurbished, the grounds have been improved and the walled garden, with its listed "crinkle crankle wall", has been brought back into use by local volunteers. A cafeteria is open to the public.

Around this time, parts of the college's archives were controversially destroyed. The college asserted that it was legally required to dispose of the records because they contained personally identifying information.

=== 2021 merger ===
In February 2021, the college agreed to merge with Activate Learning. In May 2021, the College Principal was suspended. In August 2021, it was announced that the college had been acquired by the University of West London.

== Campus and buildings ==
The college is located in the Headington area of Oxford.

=== Libraries ===
In 2012, the college opened the Callaghan Library, named after former Prime Minister James Callaghan. Students are also able to access the Bodleian Library and others of the University of Oxford.

== Organisation and administration ==
The college is a part of the University of West London Group, and operates as a charity limited by guarantee. It is administered by a board of trustees.

=== College officials ===
The college is led by a Principal, Peter John (as of 2024). He is supported by a Vice-Principal, currently Graeme Atherton.

== Student life ==
Student accommodation is provided through arrangement with local private providers.

=== Union and societies ===
The Ruskin College Students' Union provides student representation in the college.

In January 2013, the RSU joined a Unite Against Fascism protest at the Oxford Union when the Union invited Nick Griffin, the leader of the British National Party, to speak.

Students are also eligible to join the Oxford Union and other University of Oxford clubs and societies.

== Notable people ==
=== Principals ===
- 1899–1909 Dennis Hird (1st Principal)
- 1909–1916 Gilbert Slater
- 1916–1925 Henry Sanderson Furniss, 1st Baron Sanderson
- 1926–1944 Alfred Barratt Brown
- 1944–1950 Herbert Lionel Elvin
- 1950–1979 Herbert Delauney "Billy" Hughes
- 1979–1989 John Hughes
- 1989–1997 Stephen Yeo
- 1998–2003 James Durcan
- 2004–2013 Audrey Mullender
- 2014–2024 March 2016 Chris Wilkes
- 2016–2021 Paul Di Felice
- 2021–present Peter John

=== Former academics ===
- Clement Attlee, Labour Prime Minister (1945–1951)
- Peter Donaldson, economist, author and broadcaster
- Tom Mboya, Kenyan politician
- Bill McCarthy, Lord McCarthy, Labour Party politician
- Raphael Samuel, writer and historian
- Henry Sanderson Furniss, Lord Sanderson (1907–1916)
- David Selbourne (1966–1986), writer

=== Notable alumni ===
- Jack Ashley (1922–2012), Baron Ashley of Stoke, Labour Member of Parliament
- Sally Alexander English historian and feminist activist
- Michael Berry Jr (2011–2013), actor
- Judith Cummins, Labour MP for Bradford South
- Ben Enwonwu, Nigerian artist
- R. M. Fox, author and historian
- Judy Fryd, Founder of Mencap
- John Goss (1894–1953), baritone
- Fred Harrison (born 1944), British author and economist
- Jack Hilton (1900–1983), British novelist, essayist, and travel writer
- Jónas Jónsson, Icelandic educator and politician
- Sasha Johnson (born 1993) British Black Lives Matter activist and member of Taking the Initiative Party
- Joseph Anthony Kelly (born 1958) newspaper editor and political theologian
- Roy Hughes, Baron Islwyn (1925–2003), former Labour MP for Newport
- Lucy Lameck (1934–1992), Tanzanian politician and Minister
- Tom Mboya (1930–1969), Kenya civil rights hero, Minister of Economic Planning and Development
- Sally J. Morgan, emeritus professor of art in New Zealand
- Adams Oshiomhole, former Nigeria Labour Union President; Former Governor of Edo State, Current Chairman of the All Progressives Congress.
- Walter Padley, trade union leader and Labour MP for Ogmore
- John Prescott, Labour former deputy prime minister
- Charles Savarin, President of Dominica
- Phil Sawford, former Labour MP for Kettering
- Dennis Skinner, former Labour MP for Bolsover
- Siaka Probyn Stevens, Prime Minister and President of Sierra Leone
- James Walker (1883–1945), trade unionist and Labour politician
- David Webster (1931-2003), British BBC television producer and executive
- Thomas Edward Williams, 1st Baron Williams, Co-operative and Labour politician
- George Woodcock, general secretary, Trades Union Congress
- William Woodruff, historian and writer
- Robert Young, trade unionist, Labour Member of Parliament

== Ruskin Fellowship ==
The Ruskin Fellowship is an alumni association for ex-Ruskin College students and staff. Independent of but associated with the college, the Fellowship aims to support the work and ethos of the college in offering university-level education to disadvantaged adults in Britain. There is also a post graduate programme and an international section involving: International Labour and Trade Union Studies; and Webb and Chevening Scholars.

The Ruskin Fellowship was founded in the academic year 1911–1912, and held its first "Annual Meet" on 27 May 1912. This tradition continues with an Annual Reunion held in September. The Reunion is held over a weekend and incorporates speakers on relevant topics, a social activity including a bar, music and a buffet and, on the Sunday morning of the Reunion weekend, the Fellowship's Annual General Meeting (AGM). The AGM elects an executive committee to run the Fellowship for the following 12 months. A history of the Fellowship was produced in 2012 to mark the centenary of the Fellowship's first "Annual Meet".

A pamphlet on The History of the College and the Fellowship During World War One has been published as part of the commemoration of the War.
