= John Davies (Welsh miners' agent) =

Welsh politician and trade unionist

John Davies (died 25 July 1918) was a Welsh politician and trade unionist, who served as Mayor of Merthyr.

Born in Hirwaun, Davies left at the age of eight to attend school in Newchurch. Four years later, he returned to live with his father in Hirwaun, and began working at a local coal mine. He became active in the local trade union, the Aberdare, Merthyr and Dowlais Miners' Association, and when he was 27 he was elected to its executive committee. He was proposed at a workers' meeting as a labour candidate in the October 1888 Merthyr by-election, but he refused the nomination.

In 1895, Davies was elected to represent the Aberdare miners on the Sliding Scale Committee, which determined their wages. He became regarded at the deputy to local miners' agent David Morgan, and during the Welsh coal strike of 1898 collected donations from miners in North Wales and South Staffordshire. At the end of the strike, he was one of four miners' representatives who refused to sign an agreement.

After the strike, the South Wales Miners' Federation (SWMF) was established, and the local union was split into three districts. Davies was elected to the first executive committee of the SWMF. Soon after, he won election as full-time miners' agent for the Dowlais District, relocating to the area, and remained in the post until his death.

In the late 19th-century, Davies spent eighteen months on the Aberdare School Board. He was elected to represent Dowlais on the Glamorgan County Council in an 1899 by-election, as a Liberal-Labour candidate. He was made an alderman in 1905, but stood down in 1908, when Merthyr was made into a county borough. He was elected to Merthyr's first council, again representing Dowlais, and in 1914/15, he served as Mayor of Merthyr. He was the second worker to become Mayor of Merthyr, after Enoch Morrell.

Davies was a deacon at the Bethania Congregational Chapel, and advocated abstinence from alcohol.

In an obituary, the Merthyr Pioneer noted that Dowlais "may have more brilliant leaders in future – it will never have courageous, straightforward, or simple leader; a leader whose ideal of leadership was to be the spokesman of his class and kind, and not the exponent who marched ahead preaching the gospel as he conceived it should be spoken by the mob".

Trade union offices
Preceded by New position	Agent for the Dowlais District of the South Wales Miners' Federation; 1899–1918	Succeeded by S. O. Davies
