= Ebbw Vale and Sirhowy Colliery Workmen's Association =

Former trade union of the United Kingdom

The Ebbw Vale and Sirhowy Colliery Workmen's Association was a trade union representing coal miners in the Ebbw Vale area of South Wales.

== As an independent union ==
The union was founded in 1884 by Thomas Richards, as a miners' lodge affiliated to the Miners' National Union, representing colliers working for the Ebbw Vale Coal Company. In 1888, there was a dispute over the employment of contractors, and the rates paid for slag, in the course of which Richards was sacked. Richards retained the overwhelming support of the workers, and in 1889, he was appointed as the full-time agent for the union. That year, the union affiliated to the new Monmouthshire and South Wales Miners' Association, but retained a high level of independence.

By 1892, the union had 2,500 members, and this grew to 3,500 by 1898. It took part in the Welsh coal strike of 1898, but the action was defeated, and it became the Ebbw Vale District of the new South Wales Miners' Federation (SWMF).

== Ebbw Vale District ==
The Ebbw Vale District retained a high level of autonomy. Richards became the general secretary of the SWMF, and so William Vyce was appointed as a new agent. Membership grew only slightly, reaching 4,000 in 1914. By 1934 all the districts of the SWMF were in financial difficulty, and they were replaced by eight areas, with less importance. The Ebbw Vale District was merged with the Tredegar Valley District to form Area No.7, which soon became known as the Tredegar Area.

== Agents ==
1884: Thomas Richards
1899: William Vyce
1916: Evan Davies
1920: John Griffiths
