= Anthracite Miners' Association =

Former trade union of the United Kingdom

The Anthracite Miners' Association was a trade union representing coal miners in parts of Carmarthenshire, Glamorgan and Breconshire, in South Wales.

== Formation ==
The earliest trade union activity in the anthracite coalfield can be traced to 1872 when the Loughor District of the Amalgamated Association of Miners (AAM) was formed with William Abraham (Mabon) as the miners' agent. The union reached its high-water mark in 1873 when a meeting of coalowners and owners' representatives at Llanelli led to the regulation of wages. However, the fledgling union did not survive the collapse of the AAM in 1875.

== Revival ==
Representatives of miners from the Gwendraeth, Amman and Swansea Valleys began meeting once again in 1881, with the support of William Abraham (Mabon), agent for the nearby Cambrian Miners' Association. In 1882, an agreement was reached with coal owners in the district to regulate wages according to a sliding scale.

By 1883, the support was taking up more of Mabon's time, and he stated that he would withdraw from the meetings, unless the local miners established their own union. As a result, they founded the Anthracite Miners' Association, with Mabon becoming its agent, and Enoch Rees becoming part-time secretary.

== As an independent union ==
The union grew steadily; by 1892 it had 3,500 members, and covered 38 of the 42 collieries in the district. It also became politically active, partially sponsoring Mabon as a Member of Parliament, and also contributing funds to David Randell, MP for Gower, who acted as the union's solicitor.

With Mabon as its agent, the union was closely aligned with the Cambrian Miners, and it similarly supported the sliding scale of payment, whereby wages rose and fell in line with the export prices of coal. As a result, it did not join the Miners' Federation of Great Britain, which opposed the sliding scale.

In 1897, Rees was found drowned at a place known as Pwlldu in the Garw River. He was replaced as secretary by John D. Morgan. Membership of the union continued to rise, as coal production in the district increased, and by early 1898, it had reached 6,050.

Following the unsuccessful Welsh coal strike of 1898, the South Wales Miners' Federation was established, and in November 1898, the union joined the new federation, becoming its Anthracite District.

== Anthracite District ==
The Anthracite District retained a high level of autonomy, and initially continued with its existing leadership. Its membership continued to grow, and by 1900 it was decided that Mabon did not have sufficient time to continue as agent. In a close election, he was replaced by Daronwy Isaac, but Daronwy died just three years later, and Morgan took over the post, remaining in place until 1920.

Membership reached 10,856 by 1914, but by 1934 all the districts of the SWMF were in financial difficulty, and they were replaced by eight areas, with less importance. The Anthracite District was merged with the Western District to form Area No.1, which soon became known as the Anthracite Area.

== Leadership ==
=== Agents ===
1883: William Abraham
1900: Daronwy Isaac
1903: John Daniel Morgan
1920: John Thomas
1925: Jim Griffiths
1933: Arthur Horner

=== General Secretaries ===
1883: Enoch Rees
1897: John Daniel Morgan
1903: David Morgan
1920s: J. J. James
