= Monmouthshire and South Wales Miners' Association =

Trade union in south-east Wales

- Merged into: South Wales Miners' Federation
- Founded: January 1888
- Dissolved: 24 October 1898
- Location: Wales
- Members: 6,059 (1892)
- Key people: William Brace (agent)
- Affiliations: MNU, MFGB

The Monmouthshire and South Wales Miners' Association was a trade union representing coal miners in south eastern Wales.

Miners in Monmouthshire were organised in the 1870s in various small unions affiliated to the Amalgamated Association of Miners. This collapsed in 1875, and there was little trade union activity until 1886, when A. Stanley represented Monmouthshire miners at a conference of the Miners' National Union (MNU). This provided the spur for the formation of the Monmouthshire Miners' Association, in January 1888, which affiliated to the MNU.

Unlike the Cambrian Miners' Association, the Monmouthshire Miners opposed the sliding scale of wages, whereby payments varied in accordance with the export price of coal. In 1889, the Miners' Federation of Great Britain (MFGB) was established at a conference in Newport. The Monmouthshire Miners was a founding member, and the MFGB shared its position on the sliding scale. In the hope of recruiting more widely, the union changed its name to the Monmouthshire and South Wales Miners' Association.

In 1892, the union joined a committee, which for the first time brought together those Welsh coal-mining unions which supported the sliding scale, and those which did not. Subsequently, the employers ended the sliding scale in response to the Welsh coal strike of 1898. This led the Monmouthshire Miners to merge with the other local unions, forming the South Wales Miners' Federation.

The union was led by Samuel Mills, its general secretary, and its agents, William Brace and Ben Davies.

== General Secretaries ==
1888: Samuel Mills
1895: Moses Severn
