= Charles Stanton =

British politician (1873–1946)

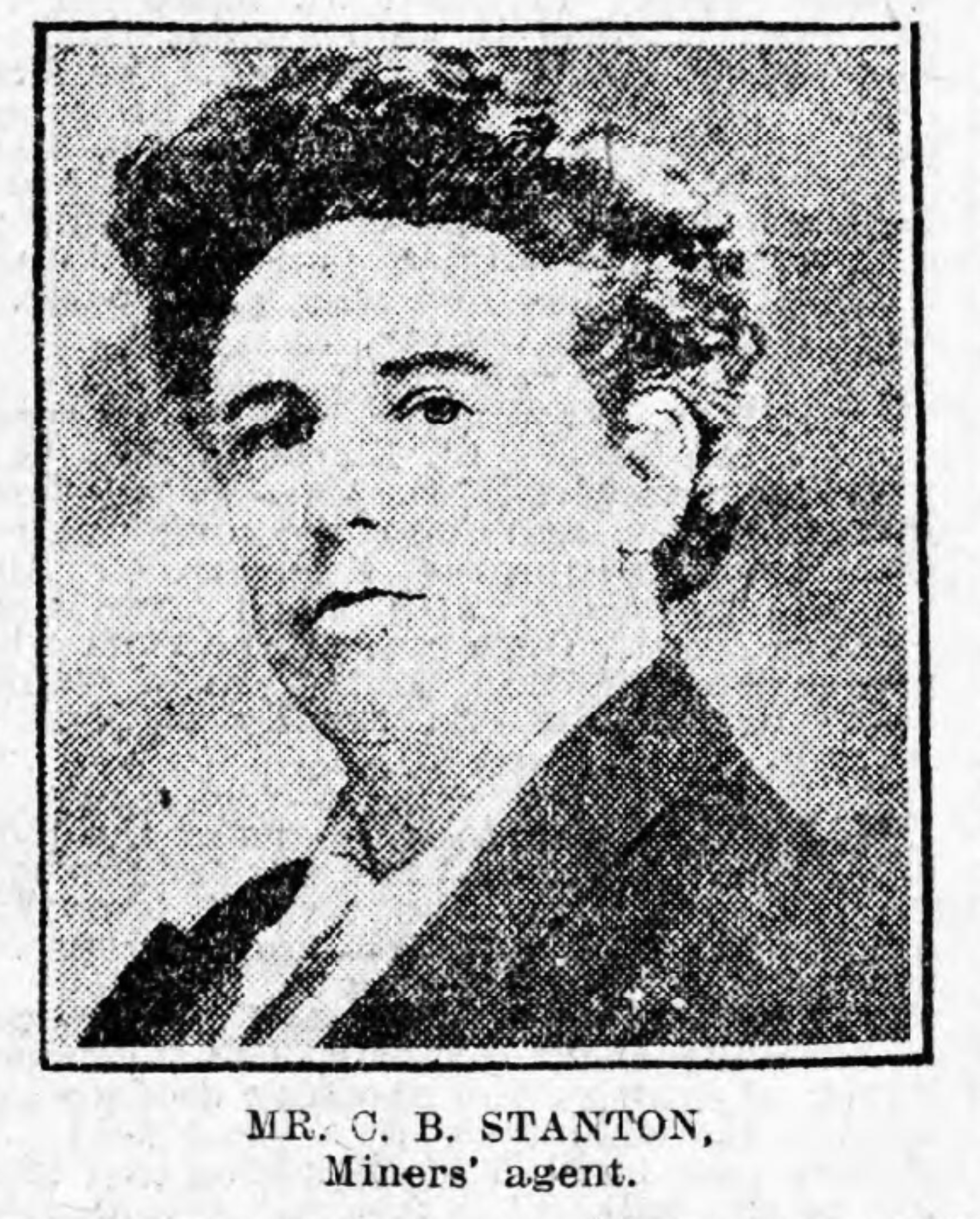
- Charles Butt Stanton

Member of Parliament for Merthyr Tydfil
- In office 1915–1918 Serving with Edgar Rees Jones (1910–1915)
- Preceded by: Keir Hardie; Edgar Jones
- Succeeded by: Constituency abolished

Member of Parliament for Aberdare
- In office 1918–1922
- Preceded by: Constituency established
- Succeeded by: George Hall

Personal details
- Born: 7 April 1873
- Died: 6 December 1946 (aged 73)

Charles Butt Stanton (7 April 1873 – 6 December 1946) was a British politician, who served as a Member of Parliament (MP) from 1915 to 1922. He entered Parliament by winning one of the two seats for Merthyr Tydfil at a by-election on 25 November 1915 caused by the death of Labour Party founder, Keir Hardie. After the two-member Merthyr Tydfil seat was divided into two single member seats, Stanton focused on the Aberdare division, which he won at the 1918 general election, but lost at the 1922 general election.

== Political career ==
=== Shooting incident ===
During the 1893 Miners' Strike, it was reported that on the night of 23 August during a confrontation between a gang of some two hundred strikers and police, a shot was fired at the police in Aberaman, the southern neighbourhood of Aberdare. The mob was surrounded and searched and a revolver was found on Charles Stanton of Aberaman, who was 21 and recently married. Stanton was charged and convicted of possessing a firearm without a licence and sentenced to six months imprisonment.

=== Miner's agent and district councillor, Aberdare ===
Stanton began his political career as a miners' agent at Aberdare where he was a member of the Independent Labour Party. In 1904, he was elected to the Aberdare Urban District Council as a member for the Aberaman Ward. Then a militant, he was critical of the more moderate approach adopted by the local Labour MP, Keir Hardie.

=== The general election of December 1910 – East Glamorganshire ===
At the December 1910 general election, Stanton unsuccessfully fought the East Glamorganshire seat as a Labour candidate.

Since its creation in 1886, East Glamorganshire had been represented by the Liberal Alfred Thomas, a prominent Baptist and former Mayor of Cardiff, who stood as candidate of 'The Liberal and Labour Association' in the constituency. For the 1910 general election, the East Glamorganshire Liberal and Labour Association selected Clement Edwards. Edwards had solid Lib-Lab credentials, a barrister who had represented trade unions in major cases, he was also active in organising trade unions and industrial action. Edwards was not a socialist and he opposed a separate Labour Party.

In February 1910, Stanton comfortably won a poll organised by the South Wales Miners' Federation to select a candidate for East Glamorganshire should Alfred Thomas retire (C. B. Stanton 6,297; Alfred Onions 3,214; Thomas Andrews 3,156; T. I. Mardy Jones 2,257). In May 1910, Stanton was selected as the Labour candidate for the seat by a trade union delegates meeting and, by July 1910, he was described as the "accepted Labour candidate for East Glamorgan". However, Stanton was not universally popular among the leadership of the South Wales Miners Federation and the Miners' Federation of Great Britain, in part because of his militant position on industrial disputes. In November 1910, the executive committee of the M.F.G.B. at first refused to place Stanton's name on the Federation Parliamentary List for East Glamorgan, a decision which was reversed the following day.

At the general election in December 1910, Clement Edwards comfortably won the seat, the Conservative candidate took second place, while Stanton finished third: Edwards (Lib-Lab) 9,088; Gaskell (Con) 5,603; Stanton (Lab) 4,675. In his speech at the declaration, Stanton said that "Although defeated, he was by no means downhearted, as he realised that he was preaching a new gospel for which the electors were evidently not prepared, but the day would come when his views would be much more acceptable.

=== The Merthyr by-election of November 1915 ===
When the United Kingdom entered the First World War, Stanton became a strong supporter of the national war effort, and publicly opposed Keir Hardie's stance opposed to the war.

Hardie's death, on 2 September 1915, a year after the outbreak of the war, caused a vacancy in one of the two Merthyr Tydfil parliamentary seats. The by-election to fill the vacancy was called for 25 November 1915.

The official Labour candidate chosen to succeed Keir Hardie was James Winstone. Winstone was a leader of the miners' union, a miner's agent since 1906, he served as Vice-President of the South Wales Miners Federation from 1912, and had recently been elected President of the South Wales Federation. He had also been a County Councillor in neighbouring Monmouthshire since 1906, and was a former chairman of the Urban District Councils of both Risca and Abersychan.

In the four by-elections held in Wales since the outbreak of war, the candidate of the former member's party had been returned unopposed, in accordance with an electoral truce agreed between the parties. It was assumed therefore that the Labour Party candidate to succeed Keir Hardie would also be returned unopposed. Arthur Henderson, the Secretary of the Labour Party, wrote to the Western Mail on 17 November stating that Winstone's candidature was supported and approved by the Miners' Federation of Great Britain, the South Wales Miners' Federation, the National Executive of the Labour Party and the Merthyr constituency conference "representative practically of every organisation in the constituency", and "Accordingly, other parties have intimated their intention of observing the obligations of the party truce."

Stanton announced that he would stand against Winstone on a patriotic, win-the-war platform. Stanton's campaign focused its attack on the Independent Labour Party. Stanton presented himself as a 'National' candidate "standing on a National platform, and respecting, as I am, the political truce, I am considering not only the opinion of Labour men but of all sections of the community. And hence I do not hesitate to say that my candidature is national in the truest sense of the term. Surely, it is obvious that the success of Mr. Winstone, which is unthinkable, would be a message of discouragement to our soldiers in the field".

In fact, unlike Hardie, Winstone was not a pacifist: he was a supporter of the war effort. One of his sons was serving in France and another had only recently volunteered. Winstone himself addressed recruiting meetings. However, Winstone did not support conscription.

Officially the national Liberal and Conservative parties were not involved in the by-election. But their members actively supported the Stanton campaign on the ground. On 23 November, the Western Mail carried a letter to Stanton's election agent from T. Artemus Jones, who had been adopted as the prospective Liberal candidate before the outbreak of war, stating that there "was no foundation [for] the rumour ... that the 'official' candidate [i.e. Winstone] must receive the support of all the great parties ... Such a contest as is being waged in Merthyr is outside the terms of the party truce because it is essentially a domestic difference among the members of one party and neither of the other parties in the State has any sort of right to interfere either with the one section or the other." Jones added that members of the Liberal and Conservative parties were free to support Stanton: "There is only one issue, one duty before the people. So long as the war lasts and the party truce continues, there are neither Tories nor Radicals nor Socialists in the party sense. That issue is the war and that duty is the vigorous prosecution of the war. ... neither the Liberals nor the Conservatives are concerned in their political organisations with the dispute between Mr. Stanton and the Independent Labour Party. In their capacity as citizens, however, they have the right to form their own judgement at this supreme hour in the fortunes of the country with regard to the support they must give the government."

Stanton was also endorsed by the Socialist National Defence Committee.

Stanton's election address described him as a "National" candidate.

Stanton won the vacant seat with a majority of over 4,000 votes in a low poll. (Stanton: 10,286 votes; Winstone: 6,080 votes).

A few weeks after Stanton's election, on 6 January 1916, the government introduced its first conscription bill. Stanton's by-election victory in Keir Hardie's old seat has been seen as facilitating the introduction of conscription. Stanton supported the Lloyd George Coalition Government throughout the war.

=== The 'Coupon' general election of December 1918 ===
Under the Representation of the People Act 1918 the existing parliamentary borough of Merthyr Tydfil (with its two parliamentary seats) was divided into two single-member constituencies. One of these was Merthyr Tydfil, Aberdare Division, which consisted of the two urban districts of Aberdare and Mountain Ash.

Stanton fought the "Coupon" general election of December 1918 for the Aberdare Division, as a National Democratic and Labour Party candidate, with the support of the Coalition National Government "coupon". He comfortably defeated the Labour candidate, Thomas Evan Nicholas (Niclas y Glais). (Stanton: 22,824 votes; Nicholas: 6,229 votes)

Stanton and Nicholas had taken opposite positions during the War. Nicholas, like Hardie, was a pacifist, and had opposed both the War and conscription. They were also opposed in their policies for the peace, Stanton supporting the policy of imposing heavy reparations obligations on the defeated nations: his manifesto demanded that "the filthy, murderous Huns" be made to pay for the war. He called for the expulsion of "all aliens".

In the Merthyr Division, at the 1918 general election, Sir Edgar Rees Jones, standing as a Coalition Liberal, defeated James Winstone, standing again as a Labour candidate, by 1,445 votes. Sir Edgar Rees Jones had first been elected to Parliament at the January 1910 general election as one of the two MPs for Merthyr Tydfil.

=== The general election of November 1922 ===
Stanton again fought the Aberdare division at the general election of November 1922, this time as a Lloyd George National Liberal candidate. He was defeated by the Labour candidate, George Hall (Hall: 20,704 votes; Stanton: 15,487 votes).

Stanton's failure at the 1922 general election was shared by the nine other MPs seeking to hold seats they had won in the "coupon" election of 1918 under the National Democratic and Labour Party banner. Among the nine was Clement Edwards, who had defeated Stanton in East Glamorganshire in 1910. Edwards won East Ham South as the NDLP candidate in 1918; he defended that seat as a National Liberal supporter of Lloyd George in 1922, but was defeated by the Labour candidate.

In 1928, Stanton joined the Liberal Party.

Parliament of the United Kingdom
| Preceded by Keir Hardie; Edgar Jones | Member of Parliament for Merthyr Tydfil; 1915–1918; With: Edgar Jones | Constituency abolished |
| New constituency | Member of Parliament for Aberdare; 1918–1922 | Succeeded by George Hall |
Trade union offices
| Preceded by David Morgan | Agent of the Aberdare District of the South Wales Miners' Federation; 1900–1916 | Succeeded by Owen Powell |
