= 1915 Merthyr Tydfil by-election =

UK parliamentary by-election

The 1915 Merthyr Tydfil by-election was a parliamentary by-election held on 25 November 1915 for the British House of Commons constituency of Merthyr Tydfil in Glamorganshire, Wales.

The seat had become vacant when the constituency's Labour Member of Parliament (MP), Keir Hardie, died on 26 September 1915, aged 59. He had held the seat since the 1900 general election, when he was elected as one of the first two Labour MPs.

== Candidates ==
In May 1915 the Liberals, the Conservatives and Labour had formed a Coalition Government, although the majority of the Labour Party had stayed outside the Government. Furthermore, from August 1914 until June 1918, a war-time electoral truce existed between the three parties; the party holding a seat would not be opposed by the other two at a by-election. The Conservatives and Liberals therefore did not contest the by-election.

Merthyr Tydfil was a miners' seat, and power within the local Labour Party lay within the locally dominant trade union, the South Wales Miners' Federation. The SWMF balloted their members to determine the Labour candidate.

The selection procedure quickly became a battle between competing factions of the Independent Labour Party, played out within the administrative structures of the SWMF. The two principal candidates were James Winstone, the President of the Federation, and Charles Stanton, a miners' agent in the constituency.

Winstone was anti-conscriptionist and pro-Union of Democratic Control. Stanton, on the other hand, was vice-president of the British Workers League, a 'patriotic labour' group which was anti-socialist and pro-war. Stanton had fought East Glamorganshire as a Labour candidate in December 1910.

The SWMF conducted three successive ballots after which Winstone was narrowly selected.

=== Results ===
Candidate	First ballot	Second ballot	Third ballot: 28 October	
Candidate	Votes	Votes	Votes	%
James Winstone	2,641	4,405	7,832	55.7
Charles Stanton	2,699	4,838	6,232	44.3
John Williams	2,508	4,391	N/A	N/A
Robert Smillie	1,816	N/A	N/A	N/A
Enoch Morrell	1,623	N/A	N/A	N/A
Majority			1,600	11.4
Turnout			14,064	Unknown

== Campaign ==
Following the result of the selection, Stanton resigned as a miners' agent and fought the election as a pro-war 'National' candidate. He attracted support from the local Liberals and Conservatives on a 'straight war ticket "to fight against the Huns for our homeland."' He was designated as 'Independent Labour' on the ballot, but he was not supported by the Independent Labour Party and was highly critical of their anti-war policy in interviews. The Independent Labour Party supported the anti-war candidate Winstone, who stood as a Labour candidate.

The wife of David Watts Morgan, Agent of the No. 1 Rhondda District of the SWMF and to be elected Labour MP for Rhondda East in 1918, supported Stanton, an act he (Morgan) later had to apologise for.

== Result ==
On a reduced turnout, Stanton won the seat with a majority of 4,206 votes.

At the 1918 general election, the Merthyr seat was divided into two single-member constituencies. Stanton fought the Aberdare seat and won it by a larger majority, defeating the pacifist Labour candidate Thomas Evan Nicholas. The British Workers League had transformed itself into the National Democratic and Labour Party and Stanton stood under its label, with the Coalition Coupon.

1915 Merthyr Tydfil by-election
Party	Candidate	Votes	%	±%
Independent Labour	Charles Stanton	10,286	62.8	N/A
Labour	James Winstone	6,080	37.2	−2.4
Majority		4,206	25.6	N/A
Turnout		16,366	67.7	−13.6
Registered electors		24,192		
Independent Labour gain from Labour				

== Previous election ==
General election, December 1910: Merthyr Tydfil
Party	Candidate	Votes	%	±%
Liberal	Edgar Rees Jones	12,258	42.2	+1.2
Labour	Keir Hardie	11,507	39.6	+2.9
Liberal Unionist	J.H. Watts	5,277	18.2	+5.6
Majority		6,981	24.0	−4.4
Majority		6,230	21.4	−2.7
Turnout		29,042	81.3	−11.7
Registered electors		23,219		
Liberal hold		Swing		
Labour hold		Swing		

== See also ==
- Merthyr Tydfil (UK Parliament constituency)
- List of United Kingdom by-elections
