= Evan Davies (Ebbw Vale MP) =

Welsh Labour Party politician

Evan Davies (1875 – 22 December 1960) was a Welsh Labour Party politician. He was the Member of Parliament MP for Ebbw Vale.

Born in Beaufort, Davies began working as a coal miner when he was twelve years old. He became active in the Ebbw Vale and Sirhowy Colliery Workmen's Association, then later became full-time agent for its successor, the Ebbw Vale District of the South Wales Miners' Federation.

Davies was a supporter of the Labour Party, for which he was returned unopposed as a Member of Parliament at the 1920 Ebbw Vale by-election. He retained the seat at the 1922 and 1923 elections, and was unopposed in 1924, retaining it until 1929, but developed a bad reputation for failing to attend local meetings, and even the House of Commons itself. In March 1927, Stanley Baldwin, the Prime Minister, visited his constituency to express sympathy for miners killed in a pit explosion, and was received with hostility because of his actions during the General Strike. Davies created great unpopularity by apologising to Baldwin for the conduct of 'a few irresponsible youths'.

The local supporters of Aneurin Bevan successfully sought Davies's deselection, and he was obliged to stand down in 1929. Bevan succeeded him, and retained the seat until his death.

Parliament of the United Kingdom
Preceded by Thomas Richards	Member of Parliament for Ebbw Vale; 1920 – 1929	Succeeded by Aneurin Bevan
Trade union offices
Preceded by William Vyce	Agent for the Ebbw Vale District of the South Wales Miners' Federation; 1916–1920	Succeeded by John Griffiths
