= Aberdare, Merthyr and Dowlais Miners' Association =

Former trade union of the United Kingdom

The Aberdare, Merthyr and Dowlais Miners' Association was a trade union representing coal miners in part of Glamorgan in South Wales.

== Origins ==
There had been trade union activity in the area from the 1830s onwards and in 1857 a major dispute which became known as the Aberdare Strike occurred. However, there was little organization among the miners until the late 1860s when news of the formation of the Amalgamated Association of Miners (AAM) reached South Wales.

== Early history ==
In 1870, the miners of the Aberdare Valley, like other parts of south Wales, started to organize and demand a wage increase.

An Aberdare District of the AAM grew rapidly in the early 1870s. By April 1871 there were 3,000 members in and around Aberdare, 1,300 at nine lodges in Mountain Ash further down the valley and a further 1,000 in Merthyr. Two months later the combined membership in the Aberdare and neighbouring Rhondda valleys had reached 9,000. In February 1872 Thomas Halliday and Alexander Macdonald addressed a mass meeting at the Temperance Hall, Aberdare.

By 1873 the Aberdare District alone claimed 9,600 members. It survived the collapse of the AAM, affiliating for a short period instead to the Miners' National Union (MNU), but it dissolved before the end of the decade.

== Later history ==
In 1879, a meeting at the Bute Arms in Aberdare established a new union, which initially represented about 4,000 miners, with David Morgan initially acting as chairman, then from 1882 becoming its full-time agent. In about 1881, a Merthyr and Dowlais District of the MNU was created, and these merged in 1884, forming what soon became known as the "Aberdare, Merthyr and Dowlais Miners' Association". Its membership stood at around 8000 by 1885 but this was said to include only around 40% of the mining workforce in the area. Constant bickering between miners' leaders was regarded as a major obstacle to unity.

It membership stood at 7,000 members in 1892, but nearly collapsed in unsuccessful Welsh coal strike of 1898, membership falling to just 500.

Following the strike, the South Wales Miners' Federation (SWMF) was established, and it was decided to dissolve the union, instead establishing three districts of the SWMF, one each for Aberdare, Merthyr, and Dowlais.

== General Secretaries ==
1879: Joseph Price
c.1880: John Lewis
1889: John Thomas
1892: David Parker

== Sources ==
- Jones, Aled (1984). "Trade Unions and the Press. Journalism and the Red Dragon Revolt of 1874" (PDF). Welsh History Review. 12 (2): 197–224.
- Pretty, David A. (June 2001). "David Morgan ('Dai o'r Nant'), miners' agent. A Portrait of Leadership in the South Wales Coalfield". Welsh History Review. 20 (3): 495–531.
