= Oliver Harris (trade unionist) =

Welsh politician

Oliver Harris (January 1873 – January 1944) was a Welsh trade union leader and politician.

Born at Rock, near Blackwood, in South Wales, Harris became a coal miner. He was interested in politics, and by 1894 was a member of Mynyddislwyn parish council, and secretary of the local branch of Cymru Fydd. Mynyddislwyn became an Urban District Council in 1903, Harris remaining a member, and serving a term as its chair.

By 1906, he was a member of the Pochin Lodge of the South Wales Miners' Federation (SWMF), and he was elected as auditor of the union's Tredegar District; in 1908, he served as the district president. In 1912, he was elected as checkweighman at the Oakdale Colliery. In 1919, he became the statistical secretary of the SWMF, and from 1921 was also its treasurer. While in the role, he supported the union's policy in the 1926 UK general strike, and was strongly opposed to the right-wing South Wales Miners' Industrial Union, arguing that trade unions must always be antagonistic to employers.

In 1932, Harris was elected as the union's general secretary, narrowly defeating S. O. Davies. The post of treasurer was abolished, and Harris became known as a practical, moderate administrator, but not a strong personality. He pushed through a rationalisation of the number of union districts, saving money, but also prioritising the role of "combines", bringing together union lodges which represented workers for the same company. He also served on the executive of the Miners' Federation of Great Britain, and on many other committees, including becoming a governor of the National Museum of Wales.

Harris retired in April 1941, moving to Marshfield, where he died three years later.

Trade union offices
Preceded by Alfred Onions	Treasurer of the South Wales Miners' Federation; 1921–1932	Post abolished
Preceded by Thomas Richards	General Secretary of the South Wales Miners' Federation; 1932–1941	Succeeded by Evan Williams
