= Vernon Hartshorn =

British politician (1872–1931)

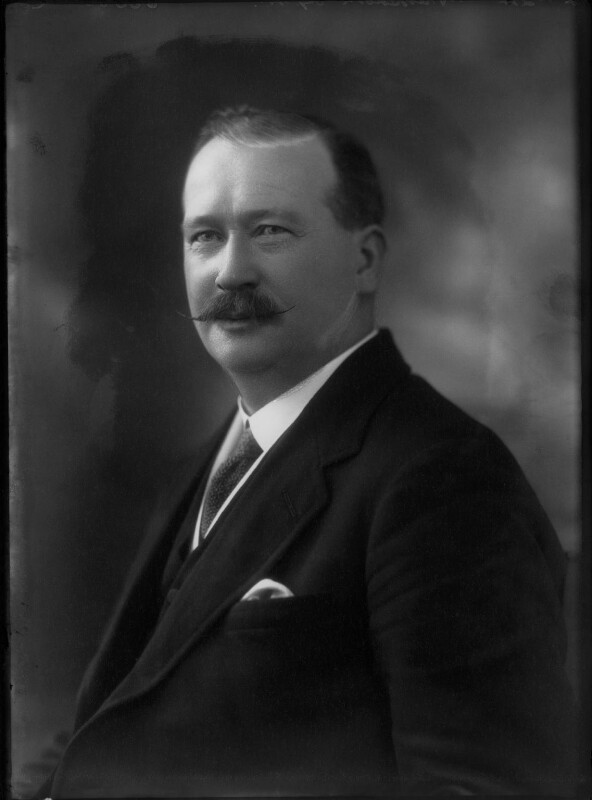
Hartshorn

Vernon Hartshorn (16 March 1872 – 13 March 1931) was a Welsh trade unionist and Labour Party politician who served as a Member of Parliament (MP) from 1918 until his death.

Hartshorn was President of the South Wales Miners' Federation, and a member of the National Executive of the Miners' Federation of Great Britain.

He was elected as Member of Parliament for Ogmore at the 1918 general election. He served as Postmaster-General in 1924, made a Privy Counsellor the same year, and became a member of the Simon Commission. In 1930, he was appointed Lord Privy Seal, serving until his death on 13 March 1931.

== Early life and education ==
Vernon Hartshorn was born on 16 March 1872 in Pontywaun, Monmouthshire. He was the eldest son of Ellen and Theophilus Hartshorn. At the time of his birth his father was a coal miner but later became a local draper/grocer.

The family were Primitive Methodists, Theophilus Hartshorn was a Sunday School teacher and Trustee of Crosskeys Primitive Methodist Church. Various sources describe Vernon Hartshorn as a Sunday School teacher and lay preacher from early adulthood. It is likely he received his education through home, local board school, chapel, work, and local institutes. A childhood friend recalls him spending one term at Oliver's Mount, a Quaker School in Scarborough, Yorkshire where he "was good at arithmetic and could solve problems off hand which the masters found tricky". This innate mathematical ability was to prove invaluable in later years.

== Early career ==
The proving ground for many young men and boys in the South Wales valleys was work at the 'pit bottom' in the local colliery, and Hartshorn was no exception. He started underground, probably at the age of 14, and we have found a record of him working at the coal face of the Black Vein Seam of the Risca Colliery for about a year between 1892 and 1893.

Ill-health resulted in Hartshorn moving to work above ground for Powell Duffryn Collieries in Aberaman from 1896. From there he transferred to the company offices in Cardiff Docks to work as a Junior Clerk. This enabled him to obtain an insight into commercial matters which was to stand him in good stead in later years.

He was later elected Checkweighman at the Risca Collieries, a position rendered vacant by James Winstone, a prominent founder member and future president of the South Wales Miners' Federation.

Hartshorn took an active part in promoting the South Wales Miners' Federation cause. He represented – with another prominent early leader, Alfred Onions – the Tredegar District of the South Wales Miners' Federation.

At the point of his election as Miners' Agent in Maesteg in 1905 Hartshorn was regarded as one of the upcoming men of the Federation. He had shown that he had a good deal of perseverance, a keen insight into mining and political matters, and a determination to do what he considered to be right however heavy the odds against him. He was recommended for the post by the principal leaders of the South Wales Miners' Federation at the time, including William Abraham(Mabon), William Brace and James Winstone, all of them speaking of his "unblemished moral character, his keenness, tact and ability, his knowledge of economic problems, and his good executive abilities". He was going to require all of those characteristics and skills in the years to come.

By 1912 he was being described, in the Pall Mall Gazette, as "the most prominent and capable of the Socialist leaders in the South Wales Coalfield".

== Early political career ==
Hartshorn sought selection as a Labour candidate in the General Election of January 1910 in the Mid-Glamorganshire constituency. On this occasion he failed to gain the support of the South Wales Miners' Federation and had to stand down. He stood again as a Labour candidate in the April 1910 by-election, and yet again in the December General Election of the same year. On both these occasions he was backed by the South Wales Miners' Federation, but he was not successful.

=== Coal disputes ===
During the National Coal Strike of 1912 there are references to Hartshorn in the press as a militant, an extremist, a socialist, as pugnacious, uncompromising and out for trouble . That said, he was not one of the group of young socialists from the Rhondda who published the Syndicalist manifesto, 'The Miners Next Step', with its sustained critique of the style of union leadership shown by the likes of William Abraham. Nor was he an advocate of conciliation and compromise, of co-operation with the coal-owners at any cost. He believed that the 'strike weapon' could and should be used.

The 1912 strike of almost 1 million miners was unprecedented. The Government, fearing widespread trouble on a much larger scale than the Tonypandy Riots of 1911, decided to intervene in the dispute. Within a month they had rushed a Minimum Wage Bill through Parliament. The resulting arrangements for miners' pay were, in operation, far from perfect, but the legislation did see the introduction of the first example of a national minimum wage.

A key player in the negotiations that took place in London, Hartshorn was less than enthusiastic about the Wage Bill, and he made it clear that it could not be accepted as a final solution to the problem. He took the view that if the men should decide to return to work, that would not be surrender, but simply a decision to test what they had won. The strike ended on 6 April 1912.

=== The first World War ===
The production of coal in Britain peaked in 1913, but the First World War brought new challenges within the industry. Throughout the War there was a constant struggle between the collieries and the army for manpower, and conscription did more than any other issue to divide the Labour movement. Also, with the War came inflation but the miner's pay failed to keep pace with the rising cost of living. It became difficult for the miners' leaders to balance the interests of the miners and the interests of the nation. In March 1915 the Miners Federation of Great Britain demanded a 20% pay increase. The coal-owners refused to discuss a national wage rise and negotiations reverted to the districts. Satisfactory agreements were reached in most areas except South Wales where the obdurate coal-owners refused to budge beyond 10%. On 15 July 1915 about 200,000 miners in Wales went on strike. Hartshorn, and other Federation leaders, had urged the miners to abandon their plans to strike, and to continue negotiating while working. He reasoned that there would be a lack of public support for a strike while the country was at war, and naval defence depended on coal. There were also risks to the credibility of the Federation in the longer term. Inevitably he was criticised by some for 'betraying' the miners. The Coal Strike of 1915 was divisive, some viewed the miners as unpatriotic whilst others criticised the mine owners. Either way, it was a serious event, and the Minister for Munitions, Lloyd George, invoked the Munitions of War Act, making the strike illegal. He also travelled to Cardiff to speak to the miners directly. They remained defiant and won many of their demands before returning to work. In November 1916 another strike over pay took place in Wales. This time the Government took control of the industry, and it was to remain under Government control for the next four years.

During the War Hartshorn visited the Western Front with other miners' leaders, ostensibly to assess morale and conditions among the troops. He became a member of the Coal Mining Organisation Committee (CMOC) established in 1915, and later a member of the Advisory Board to the Controller of Mines. He was also one of the three Wales Commissioners on the 1917 Inquiry into Industrial Unrest, and a member of the Colliery Recruiting Court in South Wales.

In January 1918 he was awarded the OBE in recognition of his service to the CMOC.This was the same month and year he lost his brother in Belgium to fighting. He visited the grave with his son not long after the finish of World War one and brought home photos of a simple wooden cross at the site. Th

Prior to, and throughout the War years, the campaign for women's suffrage continued, and it was a campaign that Hartshorn supported.He supported his daughter whilst she campaigned for Women's rights.

Parliament of the United Kingdom
New constituency	Member of Parliament for Ogmore; 1918–1931	Succeeded by Ted Williams
Trade union offices
Preceded by David Beynon	Agent of the Maesteg District of the South Wales Miners' Federation; 1905–1924	Succeeded by Evan Williams
Preceded by James Winstone	President of the South Wales Miners Federation; 1922–1924	Succeeded by Enoch Morrell
Political offices
Preceded by Sir Laming Worthington-Evans	Postmaster-General; 1924	Succeeded by Sir William Mitchell-Thomson
Preceded by James Henry Thomas	Lord Privy Seal; 1930–1931	Succeeded by Thomas Johnston
