= Emlyn Williams (disambiguation) =

Emlyn Williams (1905–1987) was a Welsh dramatist and actor.

Emlyn Williams may also refer to:

- Emlyn Williams (footballer, born 1903) (1903–?), Welsh football player for Hull City
- Emlyn Williams (footballer, born 1912) (1912–1989), Welsh football player for Barnsley and Preston North End
- Emlyn Williams (trade unionist) (1921–1995), Welsh trade union leader
