= Alf Davies =

Welsh trade unionist

Alfred Davies (1896 or 1897 – 29 August 1951) was a Welsh trade unionist.

Born in Blaengarw in Glamorgan, Davies began working as a coal miner, and joined the South Wales Miners' Federation (SWMF). He soon became secretary of the union's Caerau Ocean Lodge, and also of the combined lodges at mines owned by the Ocean Colliery Company. In 1933, he was elected to the executive of the SWMF, then in 1946 was elected as the president of its successor, the South Wales Area of the National Union of Mineworkers.

For many years, Davies was a member of the Communist Party of Great Britain. He left the party in 1950, but did not make public his reasons for doing so.

By 1951, Davies was in poor health. He attended a miners' conference in Luxembourg, where he was taken ill, and died less than a week later.

Trade union offices
Preceded by Arthur Horner	President of the South Wales Area of the National Union of Mineworkers; 1946–1951	Succeeded by Will Paynter
