= 1920 Ebbw Vale by-election =

UK Parliamentary by-election

The 1920 Ebbw Vale by-election was held on 26 July 1920. The by-election was held due to the resignation of the incumbent Labour MP, Thomas Richards. The Labour candidate Evan Davies was unopposed and declared as the victor.

1920 Ebbw Vale by-election
Party	Candidate	Votes	%	±%
Labour	Evan Davies	Unopposed		
Registered electors				
Labour hold				
