= David Morgan (trade unionist) =

Welsh miners' agent and trade unionist (1840–1900)

David Morgan (Dai o'r Nant; 14 February 1840 – 5 July 1900) was a Welsh miners' agent and trade unionist who played a prominent role in the history of industrial relations in the South Wales Coalfield from the 1870s until his death in 1900.

== Early life ==
Morgan was born at Nantygwenith, Merthyr Tydfil, the third son of William Morgan. His parents kept a public house known as the Full Moon at Nantygwenith, and this accounts for the pseudonym Dai o'r Nant. His father was a local musician of some note and there is evidence that his son inherited some of his talents. In the late 1850s the family moved to Mountain Ash where Morgan found work at the Deep Navigation Colliery.

== Industrial disputes of the 1870s ==
It is not certain when David Morgan first emerged as a trade union activist but David Pretty suggests that he addressed a meeting at the celebrated 'rocking stone' on Pontypridd Common in 1868. There is firm evidence that he actively participated in a mass meeting of miners on Aberaman in early 1870 to urge the miners of the Aberdare Valley to join with those in Monmouthshire to demand an advance in wages.

The early 1870s was a time that saw frequent industrial disputes in South Wales and there is evidence that Morgan was actively involved in these events. One of the earliest examples is of a large public meeting held at Aberaman in early 1870 attended by around 3000 miners. At this meeting, he supported a proposal that the miners of the Aberdare Valley join forces with those of the Rhondda and Monmouthshire to achieve their aims. Early in the following year, Morgan was again present at a delegate meeting of miners at Pontypridd. His involvement in these meetings demonstrate that he was already gaining stature as a representative,

During the 1870s Morgan became increasingly involved with the Amalgamated Association of Miners. In 1872, Alexander Macdonald and Thomas Halliday, the national leaders of the AAM had visited Aberdare and addressed a meeting at the Temperance Hall. Within the month, Morgan was addressing a meeting at Mountain Ash, reminding his fellow miners, 'in a temperate and telling speech', that as trade unionists they had a responsibilities to discuss their grievances with the owners before embarking on strike action. Even at this early stage, Morgan was setting out his stall as an advocate of moderation, a stance he retained for most of his career. By May 1873 he was a member of the union executive and had attended a meeting in Manchester.

In 1874 the miners' were defeated in a further coalfield-wide dispute which led to a reduction in wages. The AAM, as an umbrella organisation, went into terminal decline, although the various district unions struggled on, including that in the Aberdare Valley. Morgan sought election as miners' agent in 1875 but was defeated by Samuel Davies, Aberaman. Shortly afterwards, he withdrew from public life.

== David Morgan and Mabon ==
Morgan first came to prominence in the 1870s but was often at odds with his contemporary, William Abraham (Mabon). The contrast between the tall and imposing figure of Morgan and the corpulent Mabon was striking. They did, however, share many features, including a background in nonconformist values and fine tenor voices, which they used to effect at meetings. As the years progressed their rivalry became more personal, with Morgan often outpolling Mabon in union ballots.

Despite their personal animosity, however, and their frequent disputes on specific issues, the two men had more in common than their fiery relationship would suggest. In the 1870s, for example, both Morgan and Mabon opposed the hardline stance of Thomas Halliday and accepted that the miners would have to return to work on the owners' terms. As a result of the 1875 settlement, wages rates would be governed by a sliding scale regulated by the selling price of coal.

In 1882, Morgan was elected miners' agent for the Aberdare, Merthyr and Dowlais Miners' Association and soon found himself at odds with Mabon over, for example, proposals to restrict coal production to maintain the selling price of coal. Soon after, he became embroiled in a bitter dispute at Mountain Ash having supported his preferred candidate for the post of physician at the Deep Duffryn and Navigation collieries. The majority of the miners at the two collieries supported another candidate and the outcome was that they withdrew support from Morgan as miners' agent and aligned themselves with Mabon's Cambrian Miners' Association.

He pointedly refused to support Mabon when he successfully stood as Lib-Lab candidate for the Rhondda in 1885.

== Religious affiliations ==
Morgan was an active Baptist and served as a deacons both at the Gadlys Baptist Church and subsequently at Calfaria, Aberdare.

== Public life ==
David Morgan was involved in Liberal politics from the time of the 1868 General Election, when Henry Richard was elected as MP for Merthyr Boroughs. At the 1874 election the constituency was contested by Thomas Halliday as a Labour candidate but Morgan retained his support for Richard. In 1880 he again supported the two Liberal candidates, Richard and C.H. James. From the 1880s, Morgan became actively involved in local government and was elected to the Aberdare School Board and, in 1892, to Glamorgan County Council where he was later made an alderman. He failed, however, in his attempt to gain a seat on the Aberdare Urban District Council in 1894.

== Later trade union career ==
In early 1888, David Morgan and Mabon set aside their differences to establish the South Wales and Monmouthshire Colliery Workmen's Federation.

David Morgan and Mabon were forced to collaborate more closely when the Miners Federation of Great Britain, which was fiercely opposed to the sliding scale mechanism for regulating miners' wages, became increasingly active in south Wales. The authority of the district unions was undermined by events such as the Hauliers Strike of 1893.

In his later years, Morgan became more militant and opposed Mabon during the 1898 South Wales coal dispute. He was later imprisoned as a result of alleged intimidation at Abernant Colliery. Fellow members at Calfaria passed unanimously passed a resolution expressing "deep sympathy with our dear brother David Morgan, a worthy deacon of this church, and with his wife and family, in their deep distress." Although he was soon released on appeal the episode was said to have affected his health and he died two years later, aged 60.

== Sources ==
=== Books and journals ===
- Parry, Jon (1989). "Labour Leaders and Local Politics 1888–1902: The Example of Aberdare". Welsh History Review. 14 (3): 399–416.
- Pretty, David A. (June 2001). "David Morgan ('Dai o'r Nant'), miners' agent. A Portrait of Leadership in the South Wales Coalfield". Welsh History Review. 20 (3): 495–531.

Trade union offices
| Preceded by New position | Agent for the Aberdare District of the South Wales Miners' Federation; 1898–1900 | Succeeded by Charles Stanton |
