= James Winstone =

British trade unionist (1863–1921)

James Winstone (9 February 1863 – 27 July 1921) was a British trade unionist

Born in Risca, Winstone worked from the age of eight, first at a local brickworks, then at Risca United Colliery. He was elected checkweighman, and worked with William Brace to campaign against the sliding pay scale. As a result, he was a prominent founder member of the South Wales Miners' Federation (SWMF) in 1898.

Winstone was also active in the Independent Labour Party, and was a Baptist lay preacher. He was elected for the Labour Party to Risca Urban District Council, then to Abersychan council, which he chaired in 1911. In 1907, he was elected to Monmouthshire County Council. He stood at Monmouth Boroughs at the 1906 general election, but received no backing from his union, and was not elected. In 1912, he was elected as Vice President of the SWMF, the first socialist to such a position. He was selected as the Labour candidate for the 1915 Merthyr Tydfil by-election, the seat having previously been held by Keir Hardie, but he was defeated by Charles Butt Stanton of the British Workers League, who had resigned as a miners' agent to run with Conservative and Liberal support as a pro-war independent labour candidate. In 1915, he replaced Brace as union president, serving until his death. He also stood in Merthyr at the 1918 general election, but was again unsuccessful. In 1920, he chaired Monmouthshire County Council.

Trade union offices
Preceded by New position	Agent for the Eastern Valleys District of the South Wales Miners' Federation; 1901–1921	Succeeded by Arthur Jenkins
Preceded by William Brace	Vice-President of the South Wales Miners Federation; 1912–1920	Succeeded by Enoch Morrell
Preceded by William Brace	President of the South Wales Miners Federation; 1920–1921	Succeeded by Vernon Hartshorn
Party political offices
Preceded by Harry Davies	Wales Division representative on the National Administrative Council of the Independent Labour Party; 1912–1913	Succeeded by John Watt
