= Will Paynter =

Welsh miner and General Secretary of the National Union of Mineworkers (1903–1984)

William Thomas Paynter
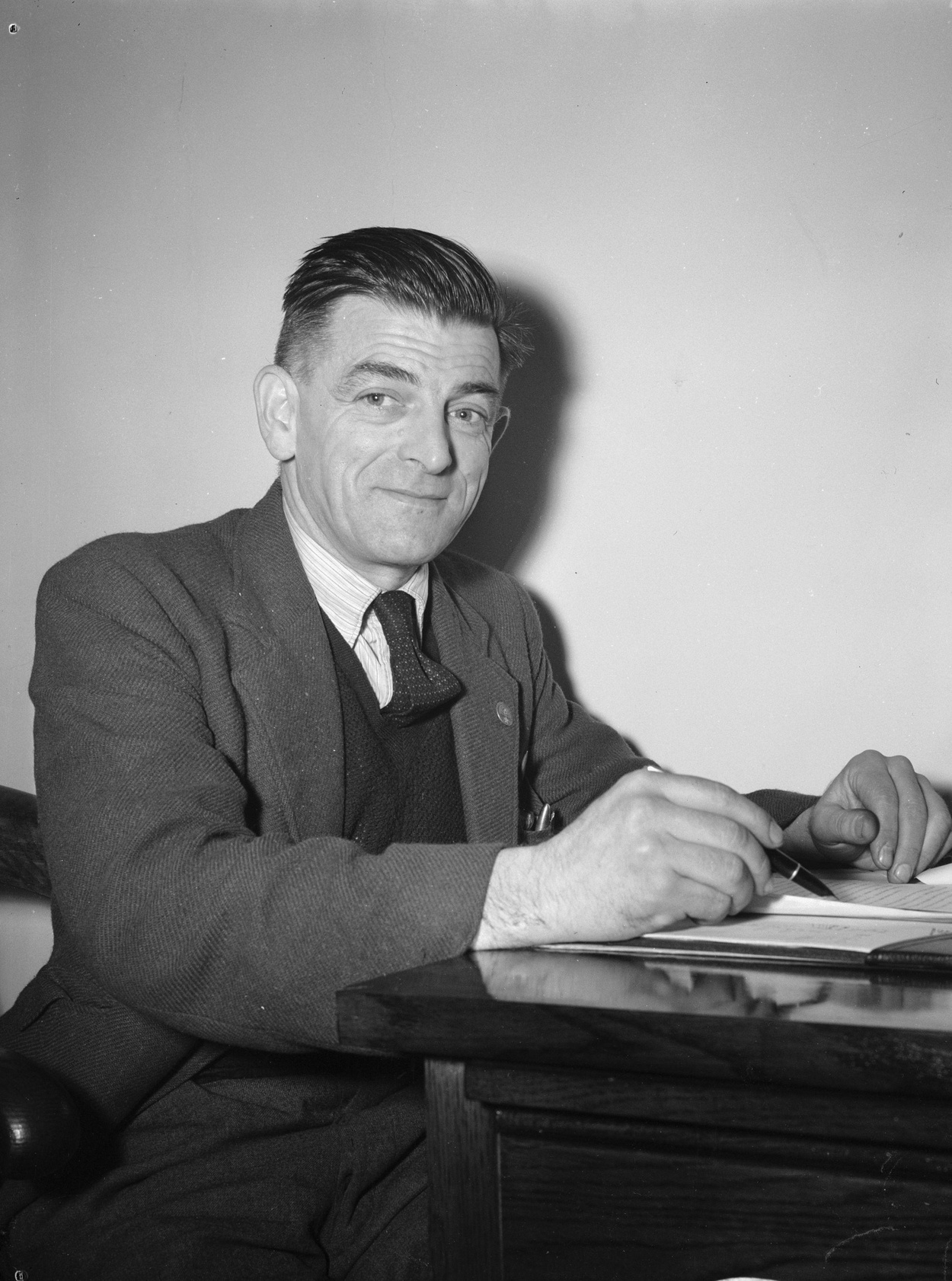
- Paynter photographed by Geoff Charles on 23 November 1951, shortly after his election as President of the South Wales Miners' Federation
- Born: William Thomas Paynter; 6 December 1903; Cardiff, Wales
- Died: 11 December 1984 (aged 81)
- Education: Left school at age 13
- Occupations: Miner, Trade unionist, Checkweigher
- Years active: 1917–1968
- Employer(s): Cymmer colliery, National Union of Mineworkers
- Known for: General Secretary of the National Union of Mineworkers (1959–1968)
- Notable work: My Generation (1972), Trade Unions and the Problems of Change (1970)
- Political party: Communist Party of Great Britain (former)
- Movement: National Unemployed Workers' Movement, Hunger marches
- Children: Seven sons

William Thomas Paynter (6 December 1903 – 11 December 1984) was a Welsh trade unionist and miner who served as General Secretary of the National Union of Mineworkers from 1959 to 1968. Born in Cardiff and raised in the Rhondda Valley, Paynter began working in the coal mines at age fourteen and became a prominent figure in the British labour movement.

Paynter was actively involved in the political upheavals of the 1920s and 1930s, joining the Communist Party of Great Britain and participating as a leader in the hunger marches of 1931, 1932, and 1936. In 1937, he volunteered to fight in the Spanish Civil War with the British Battalion of the International Brigades. He later became President of the South Wales Miners' Federation in 1951 before his appointment as NUM General Secretary, where he focused on preventing pit closures during the industry's decline. After retiring from union leadership, he wrote his autobiography My Generation (1972) and remained active in workers' education and labour history through his involvement with Llafur, the Welsh Labour History Society.

== Early life ==
Paynter was born in Cardiff, the son of a miner who had lost one eye in a pit accident and worked as an onsetter at Cymmer colliery. His mother was born in Watchet, Somerset, and worked washing and ironing for local households. The family lived on the outskirts of Cardiff until October 1915, when they moved to Trebanog in the Rhondda Valley when Paynter was eleven years old.

Paynter left school at age thirteen and initially worked on a local colliery farm for five shillings a week. On the day after his fourteenth birthday in December 1917, he began work in the coal mines, starting as a collier's assistant at Coedely colliery. He later transferred to Cymmer colliery where his father worked. By age sixteen he was working independently, by eighteen he was working on shares with his brother, and before age nineteen he was accepted by management as a competent collier.

== Trade union and political involvement ==
Paynter's political consciousness was shaped by the post-World War I revolutionary ferment and industrial strife. He began attending miners' union meetings during the 1921 lock-out when he was seventeen. His early political development was influenced by the Russian Revolution and the wave of strikes and labour unrest that swept Britain in 1919-1921.

He joined the Communist Party during the industrial conflicts of the 1920s and was instrumental in setting up the National Unemployed Workers' Movement. He participated in the hunger marches of 1931, 1932, and 1936, serving as a leader in these protests against unemployment and poverty.

== Spanish Civil War ==
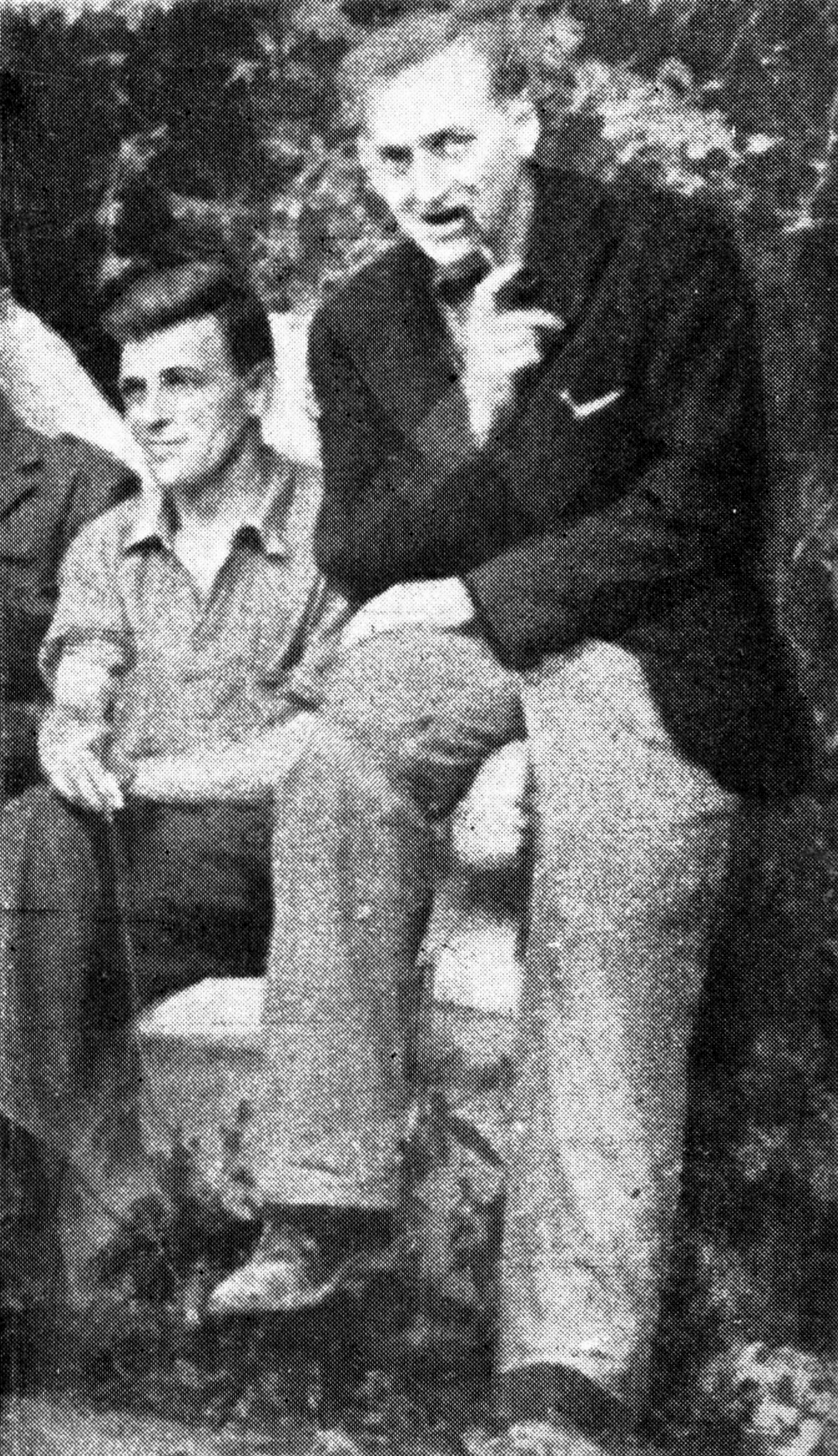
Paynter (left) with Wally Tapsell in Spain c. 1937

In 1937 Paynter volunteered to fight in the Spanish Civil War, joining the British Battalion of the XV International Brigade. The British Battalion was officially known as the Saklatvala Battalion and comprised British, Irish and Commonwealth volunteers who fought alongside the Spanish Republic against the Nationalist forces. During this period, he also undertook a clandestine mission to Nazi Germany.

Paynter was among over 2,300 volunteers from Britain, Ireland and the Commonwealth who served with the International Brigades between 1936 and 1939, of whom over 500 were killed in action. His experiences in Spain, like those of many British volunteers, were shaped by his working-class background and commitment to anti-fascist solidarity.

Following his return from Spain, Paynter later ceased to be a communist, explaining that "the union and its members always came first".

== Union leadership ==
In 1951 Paynter became President of the South Wales Miners' Federation, serving until 1959. His election marked a significant moment in Welsh mining history, as he brought both his experience as a working miner and his broader political perspective to the role.

From 1959 to 1968 he served as General Secretary of the National Union of Mineworkers, succeeding Arthur Horner in this position. During his tenure as General Secretary, he was "equally respected by miners and management" and focused particularly on "the struggle to keep the pits open, to stop the run-down of the industry, to save the mining areas from desolation". He was succeeded by Lawrence Daly in December 1968.

After retirement from the NUM, he served as a member of the Commission on Industrial Relations and later Acas. He also became President of Llafur, the Welsh Labour History Society, and was actively involved in the workers' education movement, frequently lecturing at schools and conferences and helping in the development of the South Wales Miners' Library at Swansea University.

== Later life and legacy ==
He was featured in a programme in the BBC television series All Our Working Lives, which was broadcast in the year of his death and discussed the changing nature of the coal industry.

Paynter's autobiography My Generation, published in 1972, provides a firsthand account of the transformation of British industrial relations and working-class politics during the first half of the 20th century. The work was noted for its unpretentious style and focus on the collective experiences of his generation rather than personal aggrandizement.

According to historian Hywel Francis, Paynter represented a generation of working-class leaders who combined practical union experience with broader political vision, helping to shape both the mining industry and the wider labour movement during a crucial period of social and economic change.

== Publications ==
- Trade Unions and the Problems of Change (1970)
- My Generation (autobiography) (1972)

Trade union offices
Preceded by Alf Davies	President of the South Wales Miners' Federation; 1951–1959	Succeeded by William Whitehead
Preceded by Arthur Horner	General Secretary of the National Union of Mineworkers; 1959–1968	Succeeded by Lawrence Daly

== Bibliography ==
- Paynter, Will (1972). My Generation. London: George Allen & Unwin. ISBN 0-04-923057-3.
