= Thomas Richards (Welsh politician) =

Welsh trade unionist and politician (1859–1931)

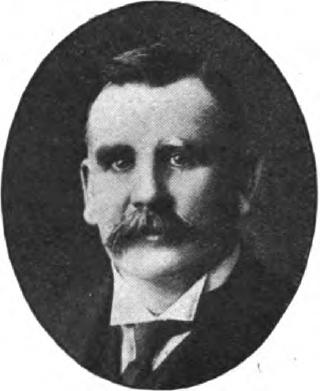
- Thomas Richards in the mid-1900s

Member of Parliament for West Monmouthshire (1904–1918) Ebbw Vale (1918–1920)
- In office 1904 (West Monmouthshire); 1918 (Ebbw Vale) – 1918 (West Monmouthshire); 1920 (Ebbw Vale)
- Preceded by: Sir William Vernon Harcourt (West Monmouthshire); New constituency (Ebbw Vale)
- Succeeded by: Constituency abolished (West Monmouthshire); Evan Davies (Ebbw Vale)

Secretary of the South Wales Miners' Federation
- In office 1898–1931
- Preceded by: New position
- Succeeded by: Oliver Harris

President of the Miners' Federation of Great Britain
- In office 1929–1930
- Preceded by: Herbert Smith
- Succeeded by: Ebby Edwards

Vice-President of the Miners' Federation of Great Britain
- In office 1924–1929
- Preceded by: Stephen Walsh
- Succeeded by: Ebby Edwards

Agent for the Ebbw Vale District of the South Wales Miners' Federation
- In office 1898–1901
- Preceded by: New position
- Succeeded by: William Vyce

Personal details
- Born: 8 June 1859; Beaufort, Wales
- Died: 7 November 1931 (aged 72)
- Political party: Liberal-Labour (1904–1909); Labour (1909–1920)
- Education: Beaufort British School
- Occupation: Coal miner, trade unionist, politician

Thomas Richards PC (8 June 1859 – 7 November 1931) was a Welsh trade unionist and politician.

Born in Beaufort, Richards was educated at the Beaufort British School, before becoming a coal miner at the age of twelve. In 1884, he was the main founder of the Ebbw Vale and Sirhowy Colliery Workmen's Association, serving as its secretary and agent. The association became part of the South Wales Miners' Federation in 1898, Richards continuing as agent of its Ebbw Vale District until 1901, while also becoming the first general secretary of the South Wales Miners' Federation.

Richards was a supporter of the Liberal-Labour movement, and was elected to Monmouthshire County Council in 1904. That year, he won a by-election to become Member of Parliament for West Monmouthshire. In 1909, he was instructed by his trade union to resign the Liberal whip and take the Labour whip and at both the 1910 General Elections he stood as a Labour candidate. He held the seat until its abolition at the 1918 general election, when he was elected for the new Ebbw Vale constituency. He resigned from Parliament in 1920.

Out of Parliament, Richards devoted his time to the South Wales Miners' Federation, and the Miners' Federation of Great Britain (MFGB). He represented them on the General Council of the Trades Union Congress from 1925, and served as President of the MFGB from 1929 to 1930.

Richards was made a Privy Councillor in 1918.

Parliament of the United Kingdom
Preceded by Sir William Vernon Harcourt	Member of Parliament for West Monmouthshire; 1904–1918	constituency abolished
New constituency	Member of Parliament for Ebbw Vale; 1918–1920	Succeeded by Evan Davies
Trade union offices
Preceded by New position	Agent for the Ebbw Vale District of the South Wales Miners' Federation; 1898–1899	Succeeded by William Vyce
Preceded by New position	Secretary of the South Wales Miners Federation; 1898–1931	Succeeded by Oliver Harris
Preceded by Stephen Walsh	Vice-President of the Miners' Federation of Great Britain; 1924–1929	Succeeded by Ebby Edwards
Preceded by Herbert Smith	President of the Miners' Federation of Great Britain; 1929–1930	Succeeded by Ebby Edwards
