= Arthur Horner (trade unionist) =

Welsh trade union leader and communist politician

- Born: Arthur Lewis Horner; 5 April 1894; Merthyr Tydfil, Glamorgan, Wales
- Died: 4 September 1968 (aged 74); London, England
- Occupation: General Secretary of the National Union of Mineworkers (NUM)
- Political party: ILP (until 1921); CPGB

Arthur Lewis Horner (5 April 1894 – 4 September 1968) was a Welsh trade union leader and communist politician. During his periods of office as President of the South Wales Miners Federation (SWMF) from 1936, and as General Secretary of the National Union of Mineworkers (NUM) from 1946, he became one of the most prominent and influential communists in British public life.

A founding member of the Communist Party of Great Britain in 1921, Horner was imprisoned during the First World War for his opposition to military service and later joined the Irish Citizen Army during his time in Dublin. He played a leading role in the 1926 General Strike and subsequent miners' lockout. During the 1930s, his pragmatic approach to trade union strategy brought him into conflict with Communist Party orthodoxy, leading to the development of "Hornerism" as a distinct political tendency that emphasised working within established unions rather than forming separate revolutionary organisations.

As NUM General Secretary, Horner was instrumental in securing the nationalisation of Britain's coal industry and implementing the comprehensive 1946 Miners' Charter, which established some of the best working conditions in British industry. By his retirement in 1959, he had transformed the position of miners from among the lowest-paid workers to having wages and conditions that rivalled any sector of the British economy.

== Early life and political development ==
Arthur Horner was born in Merthyr Tydfil, Wales, the eldest surviving son in a family of seventeen children, only six of whom lived past infancy. His father worked as a chargehand porter at the railway goods station, while his maternal grandfather and two maternal uncles were miners. Horner's earliest employment was as a grocer's assistant and delivery boy in the coalfield communities around Merthyr. After a brief period at Merthyr railway goods station, he was drawn into coalmining employment in 1915, attracted by the political radicalism of trade union activists in the nearby Rhondda coalfield.

Horner's first political affiliation was socialist, with Keir Hardie, elected MP for Merthyr Tydfil in 1900, serving as his first political hero. After joining the Independent Labour Party in Merthyr, Horner moved to the colliery village of Ynyshir in the Rhondda, where he became a protégé of Noah Ablett. Ablett was a trade union militant and executive member of the South Wales Miners Federation, who also convened local classes in Marxist education that Horner attended. During this period, Horner gradually abandoned the strong Christian faith of his teenage years, when he had been baptised into the Churches of Christ. This small but intellectually oriented Protestant sect had recognised his potential as a preacher and financed his training as a lay evangelist, experience that gave him considerable confidence in public speaking and debate.

== Wartime resistance and imprisonment ==
Opposing the First World War on grounds of class solidarity, Horner fled to Dublin in 1917 to avoid arrest for ignoring his call-up papers. As a supporter of Irish Home Rule, he became involved with rebel factions from the 1916 Easter Rising and joined the Irish Citizen Army. Horner explained that he chose Ireland because he believed the "Irish are the only people waging a war of real freedom" Upon his return to Britain, he was arrested by police and handed over to the army. For disobeying orders, he was sentenced to six months' hard labour at Wormwood Scrubs. After serving his sentence, he was denied the amnesty granted to most conscientious objectors after the war and was rearrested and sent to Carmarthen jail. The SWMF campaigned for his release and secured his election in absentia as checkweighman at Mardy Colliery, one of the most militant collieries in the Rhondda valleys. To increase pressure on the authorities, Horner began a hunger strike, refusing both food and water. After six days, this combination of tactics secured his release in May 1919.

== Communist Party membership and early trade union leadership ==
Horner became a founding member of the Communist Party of Great Britain (CPGB) in 1921. He was part of the nucleus of Communists who founded the National Minority Movement in August 1924. Elected to the executive committee of the SWMF in 1926, he played a leading role in the ten-month-long countrywide lockout of coalminers in 1926, following the General Strike.

== Hornerism ==
During the early years of the 1930s, Horner's disaffection with the CPGB's policy towards trade unions was such that he faced expulsion from the party. The term "Hornerism" emerged as a label for his deviation from orthodox Communist Party policy, particularly regarding trade union strategy.

The conflict arose from the Comintern's Third Period policy, also known as the "Class Against Class" line, which was implemented from 1928 to 1935. This policy mandated that Communist parties worldwide should reject collaboration with social democratic parties and existing trade unions, instead forming separate revolutionary organisations. In the trade union context, this meant Communists were expected to break away from established unions and create new revolutionary unions under direct Communist control.

Horner opposed this policy from 1929, arguing against splitting from existing unions to form new revolutionary unions. This stance brought him into direct conflict with younger party militants, led by William Rust, editor of the Daily Worker from 1930, who labelled his approach 'Hornerism'. Horner believed that working within established trade unions was more effective than creating rival organisations that would inevitably be weaker and more isolated.

During the 1930s, Horner further alienated sections of the Communist Party by advocating for more disciplined use of industrial action. He opposed unofficial or 'wildcat' strikes and insisted on loyalty to mainstream unions rather than revolutionary adventurism. His approach prioritised building Communist influence within existing trade union structures over ideologically pure but practically ineffective separate organisations.

"Hornerism" was formally denounced by the CPGB Executive as a deviation from the Comintern's Third Period line. Horner travelled to Moscow in 1931 to appeal against his proposed expulsion before a Comintern commission. The verdict, which identified mistakes on both sides, was sufficiently equitable for Horner to feel he could comply with the required public admission of his alleged mistakes. This resolution allowed him to remain in the party while quietly continuing his pragmatic approach to trade union work.

Horner's strategic approach was ultimately vindicated by events. His emphasis on working within established unions and building practical influence rather than pursuing ideological purity proved more effective in advancing working-class interests. His later success as President of the SWMF and General Secretary of the NUM demonstrated the effectiveness of his methods over the doctrinaire approach initially favoured by the party leadership.

In 1932, imprisoned on trumped-up charges of unlawful assembly, Horner took the opportunity availed to him as Cardiff prison librarian to study The Art of War by Carl von Clausewitz, a work which would significantly influence his future approach to formulating Union strategy and class politics in general – often leading to further conflict with the CPGB Executive. His increased strategic awareness would leave him strongly inclined against indiscriminate outbreaks of industrial action jeopardising the Union's strength and ability to win concessions for its members.

== Union leadership ==
Having stood unsuccessfully as a CPGB Parliamentary candidate in the 1933 Rhondda East by-election, Horner was elected President of the South Wales Miners' Federation in 1936. He served until 1946 and was instrumental in effecting a series of compromise settlements with the coal owners that rationalized industrial relations and improved wages and conditions.

During the Second World War, from his position on the Executive of the Miners' Federation of Great Britain, Horner exploited to the full the union's enhanced bargaining position, securing significant improvements in miner's wages and conditions. He played a key role in regulating relations between the wartime government, the coal owners, and the unions. His force of character and intellectual abilities were recognised by civil servants and ministers in the wartime coalition government, who used his enthusiasm and tactical finesse to great advantage to maximise coal production.

In August 1946, Horner was elected General Secretary of the unified National Union of Mineworkers (NUM) into which the coalfield unions had merged. Horner's reputation was such that he was in a commanding position to direct the union's strategy on the nationalisation of the industry and thereafter during the period of post-war reconstruction. This strategy linked a commitment to increased productivity to a series of demands set out in the 1946 Miners' Charter. These included: a five-day working week without loss of pay; a guaranteed weekly wage average wage not to fall below that of any other sector of British industry; two weeks paid holiday; adequate pensions at the age of fifty five; modernisation at existing pits together with the sinking of new ones; adequate training for young people; new safety laws; proper compensation payments for industrial injury and disease; the construction of new towns and villages with good housing in mining areas.

The early agreement in principle to the terms of the Charter by the newly elected Labour government reflected its urgent desire to have the NUM's full support for the newly nationalised industry. It was also an acknowledgement that Horner's expertise and influence was indispensable to delivering much needed increases in coal production. Nationalisation took effect from 1 January 1947 and The National Agreement of the same year delivered the five-day working week. By 1955 all 12 points of the Charter had been implemented.

By the time he retired from office in 1959, the NUM had secured on behalf of its membership some of the best terms and conditions of employment of any sector of British industry.

== Later life and death ==
In 1959 he was made a Freeman of the County Borough of Merthyr Tydfil.

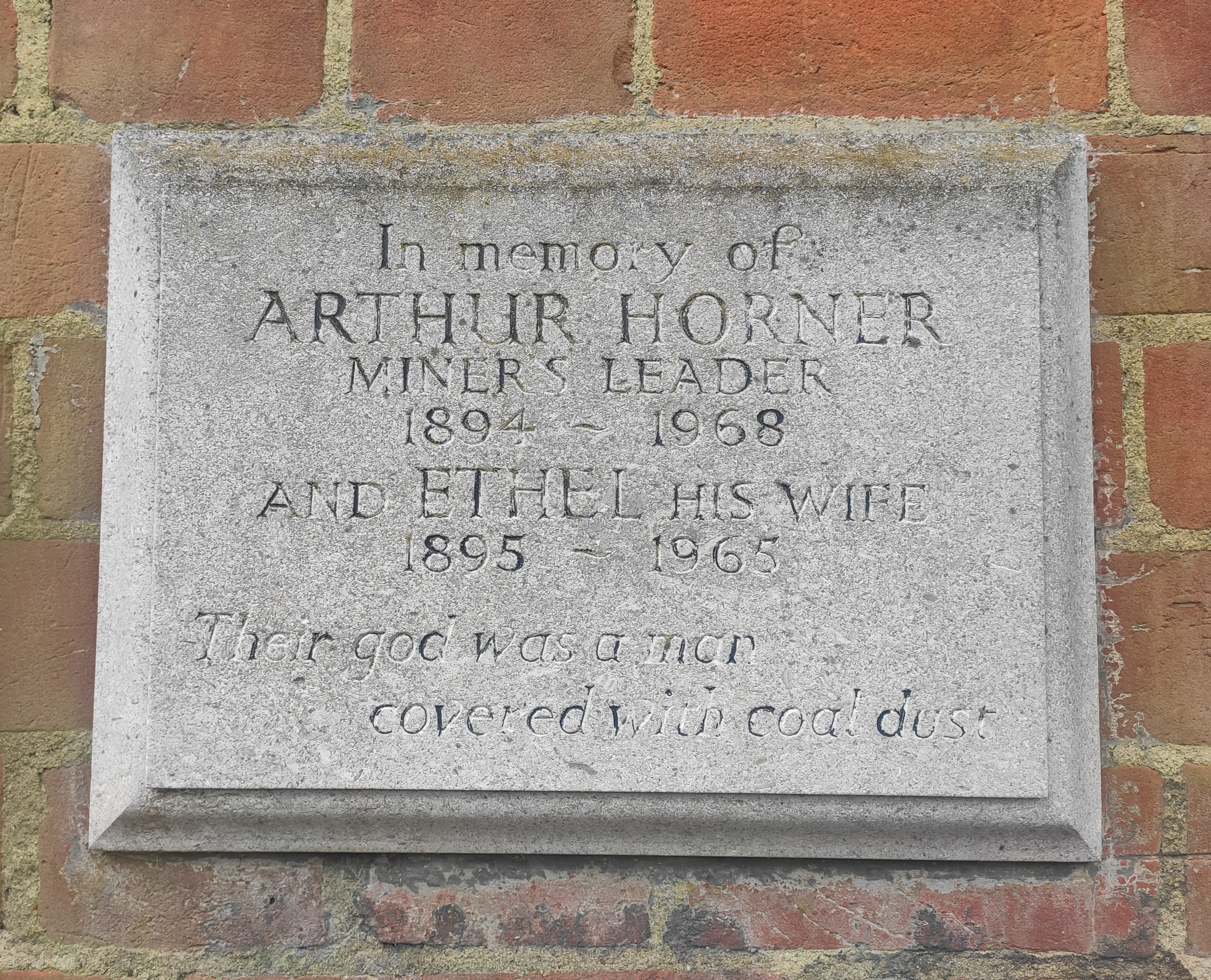
Plaque dedicated to Horner and his wife at Golders Green Crematorium

Horner died in 1968 at the age of 74. He was cremated at Golders Green Crematorium.

== Bibliography ==
- Arnot, R. Page (1961). The Miners in Crisis and War. London: Allen and Unwin.
- Fishman, Nina (1996). "Heroes and anti-heroes: communists in the coalfields". In Campbell, Alan; Fishman, Nina; Howell, David (eds.). Miners, Unions and Politics 1910–1947. Aldershot: Scolar Press.
- Fishman, Nina (2001). "Horner and Hornerism". In McIlroy, J; Morgan, K; Campbell, A (eds.). Party People, Communist Lives. London: Lawrence and Wishart.
- Fishman, Nina (2010). Arthur Horner: A Political Biography. Volume 1 1894–1944, Volume 2 1944–1968. London: Lawrence & Wishart.
- Horner, Arthur (1960). Incorrigible Rebel. London: MacGibbon and Kee.
- Hobsbawm, E. J. (1964). Labouring Men: Studies in the History of Labour. London: Weidenfeld and Nicolson. ISBN 0-297-76402-0.

Trade union offices
Preceded by Ted Williams	Checkweighman at Mardy Colliery; 1918–1919	Succeeded by A. J. Cook
Preceded by James Griffiths	President of the South Wales Miners Federation (from 1945 National Union of Mineworkers South Wales District); 1936–1946	Succeeded by Alf Davies
Preceded by Bill Bayliss and Harry N. Harrison	Trades Union Congress representative to the American Federation of Labour; 1944; With: John Brown	Succeeded by Tom O'Brien and Sam Watson
Preceded by Ebby Edwards	General Secretary of the National Union of Mineworkers; 1946–1959	Succeeded by Will Paynter
