= Cambrian Miners' Association =

Former trade union of the United Kingdom

Cambrian Miners' Federation
- Merged into: South Wales Miners' Federation
- Founded: 1872
- Dissolved: November 1898
- Headquarters: Ton Pentre
- Location: United Kingdom
- Members: 14,000 (1885)
- Key people: William Abraham
- Parent organization: Amalgamated Association of Miners (to 1875)

The Cambrian Miners' Association, also known as the Rhondda District Miners' Association, was an early trade union representing coal miners in the Rhondda Valley, in Wales.

The Amalgamated Association of Miners (AAM) began recruiting members in the Rhondda Valley in 1870, William Brown chairing a recruitment meeting. Members in the valley were part of a largely successful strike in 1871, and early in 1872 they were placed in their own, Rhondda District. Rhondda District secretary, Williams Davies, disappeared partway through a lock out in 1875, and the AAM collapsed soon afterwards. The Rhondda District, like the other surviving Welsh districts, instead joined the Miners' National Union, and was represented by Henry Rowlands at a conference of its Monmouthshire and South Wales Council, in 1876.

Mabon had been the AAM's last agent in South Wales, and he was elected as president of a reformed AAM in 1877. He relocated to the Rhondda in 1877. That year, the Cambrian Miners' Association split, the minority becoming the Rhondda House Coal Miners' Association, and the majority becoming the Rhondda Steam Coal Miners' Association, choosing Mabon as its agent.

Under Mabon's leadership, the union grew rapidly, and his success led to the creation of numerous other unions of coal miners in South Wales. The Cambrian Miners remained the largest of these unions, membership reaching 14,000 by 1885, although this fell to 10,000 by 1893. Retention was good partly because the union worked with colliery clerks to deduct subscriptions directly from members' wages.

The union was led by an executive committee, which alone held the ability to order industrial action and determine strike pay. However, a monthly meeting of delegates from each mine made other policy decisions. It supported the "sliding scale", whereby wages rose and fell in line with the export price of coal, agreed through a joint committee with employers. The Miners' Federation of Great Britain (MFGB) opposed this practice, so the Cambrian Miners did not affiliate to the MFGB.

Mabon was elected as the Member of Parliament for Rhondda at the 1885 general election, with the sponsorship of the union. In 1896, the union's secretary, William Evans, was also approved as a candidate, but he ultimately did not stand for election. The union's other leading figure was its treasurer, Thomas Davies, owner of a pub in Ton Pentre.

In 1892, the union joined a committee, which for the first time brought together those Welsh coal-mining unions which supported the sliding scale, and those which did not, and in 1893 Mabon was appointed as its president. Subsequently, the employers ended the sliding scale in response to the Welsh coal strike of 1898. This led the Cambrian Miners to merge with the other local unions, forming the South Wales Miners' Federation. The area covered by the Cambrian Miners' Association became the No. 1 District of the new federation.
