= William Brace =

Welsh politician (1865–1947)

The Right Honourable William Brace PC
- Brace in 1906

Under-Secretary of State for the Home Department
- In office 30 May 1915 – 10 January 1919
- Prime Minister: H. H. Asquith; David Lloyd George
- Preceded by: Cecil Harmsworth
- Succeeded by: Hamar Greenwood

Deputy Leader of the Labour Party
- In office 6 February 1911 – 13 February 1912
- Leader: Ramsay MacDonald
- Preceded by: J. R. Clynes
- Succeeded by: James Parker

Member of Parliament for Abertillery
- In office 14 December 1918 – 11 November 1920
- Preceded by: Constituency established
- Succeeded by: George Barker

Member of Parliament for South Glamorganshire
- In office 8 February 1906 – 14 December 1918
- Preceded by: Windham Wyndham-Quin
- Succeeded by: William Cope (Llandaff and Barry)

President of the South Wales Miners Federation
- In office 1912–1915
- Preceded by: William Abraham
- Succeeded by: James Winstone

Personal details
- Born: 23 September 1865 Risca, Monmouthshire, Wales, UK
- Died: 12 October 1947 (aged 82) Newport, Gwent, Wales, UK
- Party: Labour (1909–)
- Other political affiliations: Liberal (–1909)
- Spouse: Nellie Humphreys
- Children: 3

William Brace (23 September 1865 – 12 October 1947) was a Welsh trade unionist and Liberal and Labour politician.

== Early life and career ==
Born in Risca, in the coal-mining district of Monmouthshire, he was one of six children of Thomas and Anne Brace. Brace briefly attended school before starting work at the local colliery, aged 12. He later worked at Celynnen and Abercarn collieries He soon involved himself in trade union activities and politics and in 1890 was elected the local agent for the Monmouthshire Miners' Association. He was also elected to Monmouthshire County Council.

== Trade Union career ==
Brace was an early advocate of a single union for all of Britain's colliers, an issue in which he clashed with William Abraham (Mabon). Following the Welsh coal strike of 1898 the Miners' Association became part of the new South Wales Miners' Federation, and Brace was elected its first vice-president. He was later to be the union's president from 1912 to 1915.

== Parliamentary career ==
During the early years of the twentieth century, there was considerable debate within Welsh Liberal Party circles around the selection of working men as Liberal candidates. This had intensified after the election Keir Hardie as the first independent Welsh Labour MP in 1900. Hardie made outspoken attacks on nonconformity and the Liberal establishment and this made even moderate labour leaders such as Mabon appear suspect in the eyes of local Liberal associations. In 1903, Brace presented his name for the South Glamorganshire constituency, held since 1895 by a Conservative landowner. Only after considerable pressure from the Liberal chief whip, Herbert Gladstone, did the Liberal Association in the constituency agree to adopt Brace as their candidate.

At the 1906 general election he was elected as a Liberal-Labour member of parliament for South Glamorganshire, holding the seat at the next two general elections. He continued taking the Liberal whip for some years, despite the Miners' Federation of Great Britain, which sponsored him, having affiliated to the Labour Party in 1909. During the First World War he held the post of Under-Secretary of State for the Home Department in Lloyd George Coalition Government. He was made a Privy Counsellor in 1916. When the South Glamorganshire seat was abolished at the 1918 general election, he was elected unopposed to represent the new Abertillery seat, this time as Labour Party MP.

== Later life ==
He resigned from the House of Commons in 1920 in the wake of a bitter dispute within the miners' unions. Brace was criticised over his failure to support the "Datum Line" strike while he was equally critical of the "wild" union leaders who were determined to bring about conflict in the coalfields. He decided he could better serve the interests of the coal miners by taking up the position of Labour Advisor to the Ministry of Mines.

His brother George Brace borrowed money from him and other family members to form Brace's Bakery.

Brace married Nellie Humphreys in 1890. The couple had had two sons and a daughter. The younger son, Ivor Llewellyn Brace, became Chief Justice of the Supreme Court of Sarawak, North Borneo and Brunei.

William Brace died after a long illness at his home in Allt-yr-yn, Newport in October 1947 aged 82.

== Sources ==
=== Books and Journals ===
- Morgan, Kenneth O. (1981). Rebirth of a Nation. Wales 1880-1980. Cardiff: University of Wales Press. ISBN 0-19-821760-9.

== Images ==
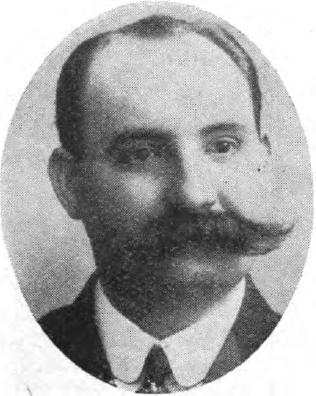
William Brace in the mid 1900s

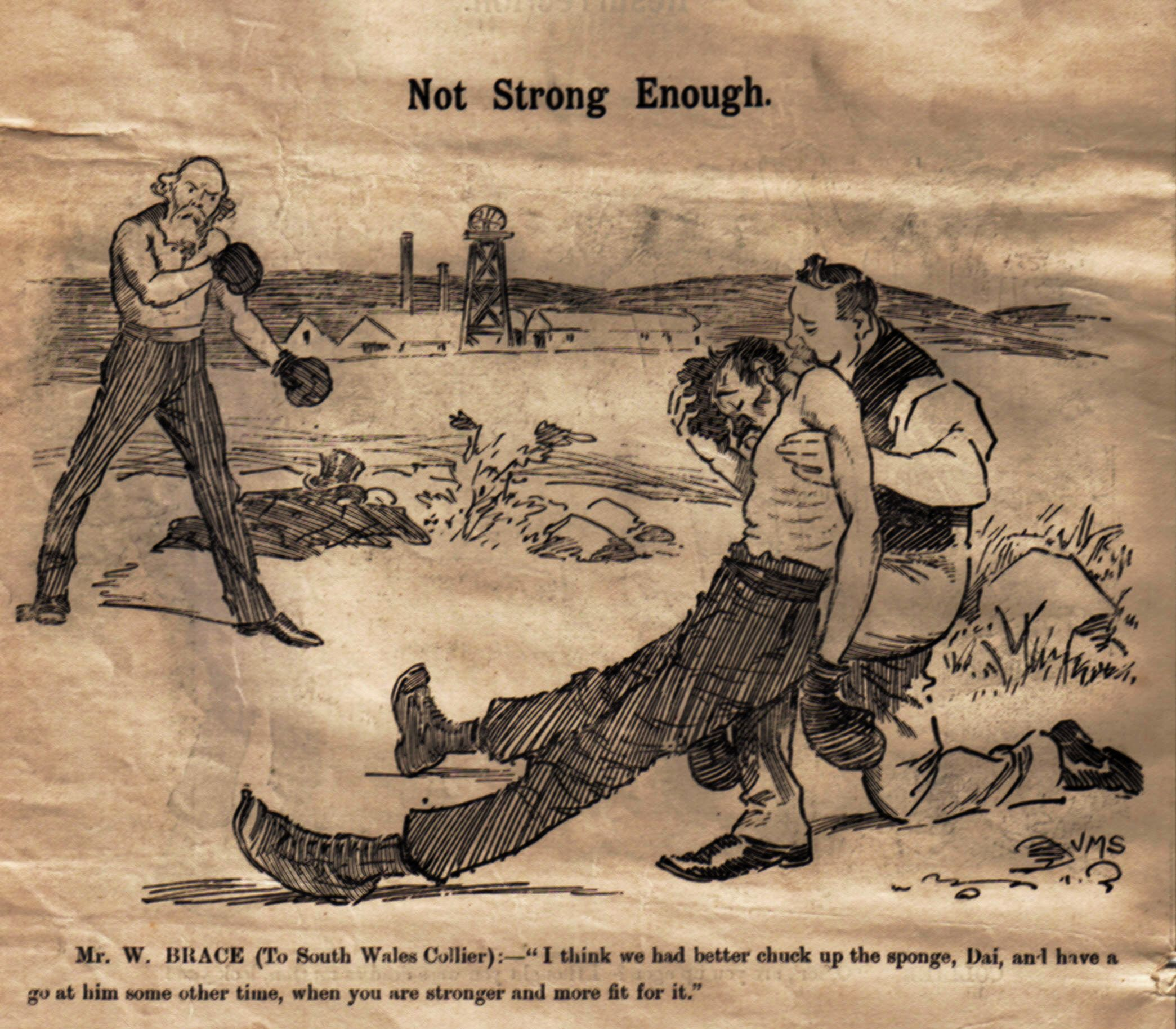
Western Mail Cartoon by JM Staniforth attacking the perceived lack of support from the unions in the Welsh coal strike of 1898

Parliament of the United Kingdom
Preceded by Windham Wyndham-Quin	Member of Parliament for South Glamorganshire; 1906–1918	Constituency abolished
New constituency	Member of Parliament for Abertillery; 1918–1920	Succeeded by George Barker
Trade union offices
New post	Agent for the Monmouth Western Valleys District of the South Wales Miners' Federation; 1898–1906	Succeeded by Michael Roach
Preceded by J. R. Clynes; Alfred Henry Gill	Trades Union Congress representative to the American Federation of Labour; 1910; With: Ben Turner	Succeeded by James Crinion; George Henry Roberts
New post	Vice-President of the South Wales Miners Federation; 1898–1912	Succeeded by James Winstone
Preceded by William Abraham	President of the South Wales Miners Federation; 1912–1920	Succeeded by James Winstone
