= Emlyn Williams (trade unionist) =

Emlyn Williams (20 February 1921 – 14 July 1995) was a Welsh trade unionist.

Born in Aberdare, Williams attended the Parc School until he was fourteen, when he went to work at the Nantmelyn Colliery with his father. He joined the British Army at the outbreak of World War II and served in the Royal Horse Artillery and then the Royal Armoured Corps. He remained with the army until 1947, when the nationalisation of the coal mining industry led him to hope for improved conditions in the mines.

On returning to Wales, Williams again worked at Nantmelyn and became active in the South Wales Area of the National Union of Mineworkers (NUM). He was elected as chairman of its Bwllfa lodge; he later moved to Mardy Colliery and again served as chair of the local lodge. From 1957, he worked full-time for the NUM as an agent for the Rhondda, Cynon and Merthyr Tydfil area, and by his retirement, he was the NUM's longest-serving employee.

Williams was elected to the executive of the South Wales area in 1955, then as vice-president in 1966, and president in 1973 - the first candidate for president to be elected unopposed since Mabon in 1898. His time as president was marked by a series of strikes: the national strike of 1974, then a South Wales strike against pit closures in 1981. The 1981 strike succeeded in preventing immediate closures, but six of the seven pits closed within three years, regardless.

When a national strike was declared in 1984, the majority of NUM members in South Wales voted against striking. Williams accepted this result, but the strike nevertheless rapidly took hold, and within a week, almost all miners in the region were on strike; 93% of them remained on strike until its end, in March 1985.

Williams retired in 1986 to his home in Cwmbach, and died of pneumoconiosis in 1995.

Trade union offices
Preceded by Glyn Williams	President of the South Wales Area of the National Union of Mineworkers; 1973–1986	Succeeded by Des Dutfield
