= Enoch Morrell =

Welsh trade unionist and politician

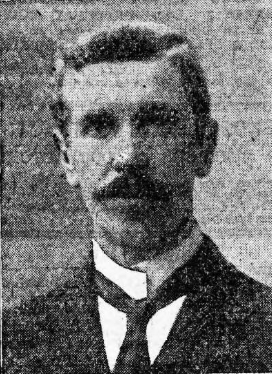
Morrell in 1905

Enoch Morrell (1860 – April 1934) was a Welsh trade unionist and politician.

Born in Troed-y-rhiw, Morrell left school at the age of ten and began working underground at the Saron Level Colliery. He later became a hewer and, after twenty years underground, was elected as checkweighman at Nixon's Navigation Colliery. He joined the South Wales Miners' Federation (SWMF), and was elected to its executive, also serving on the conciliation board for the Taff and Cynon district.

Morrell was also politically active, and served on the Merthyr Urban District Council for four years, during which time he chaired both the health and lighting committees. In 1905, a town council was established in Merthyr. Morrell topped the poll in the Plymouth ward, and was then elected as the first Mayor of Merthyr. He attempted to become the Labour Party candidate in the 1915 Merthyr Tydfil by-election, but in a ballot of SWMF members, he took last place, and so his name did not go forward for consideration.

Morrell was elected as full-time agent for the Taff and Cynon District of the SWMF in 1908, and became known as a leading member of the right wing of the union. He was vice-president of the union by 1922, and in 1924, he was elected as president, serving until his death in 1934. In the 1932 New Year Honors, he was made a Commander of the Order of the British Empire.

Trade union offices
Preceded by James Winstone	Vice President of the South Wales Miners' Federation; 1921–1924	Succeeded by S. O. Davies
Preceded by Vernon Hartshorn	President of the South Wales Miners' Federation; 1924–1934	Succeeded by Jim Griffiths
