= South Wales Miners' Industrial Union =

Former trade union of the United Kingdom

The South Wales Miners' Industrial Union, was a union set up in 1926 to counter the influence of the more radical South Wales Miners' Federation. It was strong in pits such as Taff Merthyr, Trelewis, Treorchy and Bedwas. From 1934 onwards the South Wales Miners' Federation launched a campaign against its existence and it was disbanded in 1938.
