= South Wales Miners' Federation =

Miners' union in Wales

- South Wales Miners' Federation "The Fed"; South Wales Area of the National Union of Mineworkers (since 1945)
- Predecessor: Cambrian Miners' Association; Anthracite Miners' Association; Aberdare, Merthyr and Dowlais Miners' Association; Ebbw Vale and Sirhowy Colliery Workmen's Association; Monmouthshire and South Wales Miners' Association; Western Miners' Association + 4 other local unions
- Merged into: Became NUM South Wales Area (1945)
- Founded: 24 October 1898; 128 years ago
- Headquarters: Cardiff (1898–1945); Maesycoed, Pontypridd (1945–present)
- Location: United Kingdom
- Members: 1898: 60,000 (47% of workforce); 1900: 127,894 (87% of workforce); Historical peak: c. 270,000 (1920s); 1936: 130,000 (post-Depression); Current: 64 (2023)
- Key people: Founding leadership (1898): William Abraham (first president); Thomas Richards (first secretary); William Brace (vice-president); Notable leaders: Arthur Horner (president 1936–46); Will Paynter (president 1951–59); Dai Francis (secretary 1963–76); Current leadership: Wayne Thomas (secretary); Kevin T. Thomas (chair)
- Parent organization: National Union of Mineworkers (since 1945)
- Affiliations: Miners' Federation of Great Britain (1899–1945); National Union of Mineworkers (1945–present)

The South Wales Miners' Federation (SWMF), nicknamed "The Fed", was a trade union for coal miners in South Wales. Founded on 24 October 1898 following the defeat of the 1898 miners' strike, it emerged from the merger of ten local miners' unions to become one of the most powerful and influential trade unions in British history. The federation transformed South Wales from the least unionised major coalfield in Britain - with only 18% membership in 1897 - to achieving an unprecedented 87% workforce penetration by 1900.

The SWMF played a central role in some of the most significant industrial confrontations in British labour history, including the Cambrian Combine Dispute and Tonypandy Riots of 1910-11, the General Strike of 1926, and the 1984-85 miners' strike. The federation was instrumental in the political transformation of the South Wales coalfield, shifting from Liberal to Labour allegiance and becoming a centre of radical politics, with communities like Maerdy earning the nickname "Little Moscow" during the interwar period.

At its peak in the 1920s, the SWMF represented over 270,000 miners across South Wales and later extended its organisation to the Forest of Dean and Somerset Coalfield. The federation championed the cause of coal nationalisation from 1918 onwards, a goal finally achieved when the Labour government nationalised the industry in 1947. In 1945, the SWMF became the South Wales Area of the National Union of Mineworkers, with reduced autonomy but continued influence.

The union's decline paralleled that of the coal industry itself. The devastating defeat of the 1984-85 miners' strike opened the way for mass pit closures across the coalfield, effectively ending coal mining as the dominant industry in South Wales. Today, the organisation survives as the South Wales Area of the National Union of Mineworkers with just 64 members, a remnant of what was once one of Britain's most formidable trade unions and a defining institution of Welsh industrial society.

== Background ==
=== The coal boom and early labour organisation ===
The rapid expansion of the South Wales coalfield from the mid-nineteenth century fundamentally transformed the region's economic and social landscape. By 1850, the discovery of high-quality steam coal in the Rhondda valleys had triggered unprecedented industrial growth, making South Wales coal internationally renowned for its efficiency in powering steam engines and naval vessels. This expansion created a vast workforce of miners, many of whom migrated from rural Wales, the West Country, and Ireland to work in the rapidly developing collieries.

However, the very speed of this industrial transformation created significant challenges for labour organisation. The dispersed nature of the early coalfield, with numerous small collieries owned by different companies, made coordinated trade union activity extremely difficult. Moreover, the coal owners' dominance over their local communities - controlling not only employment but often housing, shops, and credit - created a system of dependency that militated against collective action.

=== Early union attempts: the Amalgamated Association of Miners ===
The first significant attempt at organising South Wales miners came with the expansion of the Amalgamated Association of Miners (AAM) into the region during the early 1870s. Founded in Lancashire in 1869 by Thomas Halliday and William Pickard, the AAM represented a new model of trade unionism based on centralised organisation and systematic support for local strikes.

In South Wales, the AAM achieved remarkable initial success, building a membership of approximately 42,000 by 1873. The union's most significant achievement was establishing the Loughor District in 1872, with William Abraham (later known as "Mabon") serving as the miners' agent, marking the beginning of his long career as the most influential figure in Welsh mining politics.

=== The collapse of 1875 and its aftermath ===
The AAM's presence in South Wales proved short-lived. Following bitter disputes in 1871 and 1872, and facing sustained opposition from coal owners, the organisation collapsed in 1875. This collapse left the South Wales coalfield largely without effective trade union representation for over a decade, a period during which the coal owners consolidated their control over wages and working conditions.

Of all the AAM's constituent organisations, only the Cambrian Miners' Association, centred in the Rhondda valleys, survived the general collapse. Under Abraham's leadership, this union not only endured but steadily expanded its membership base, serving as a beacon for future organisational efforts. The survival of the Cambrian Miners' Association proved crucial, as it provided both organisational experience and leadership continuity for the later development of the South Wales labour movement.

=== The sliding scale controversy ===
During the 1880s and early 1890s, the scattered local unions that gradually emerged faced a fundamental strategic division over wage negotiation methods. The central issue was the "sliding scale" system, whereby miners' wages fluctuated automatically with the export price of coal. This system, favoured by many coal owners and some moderate trade unionists, was seen as providing stability and shared prosperity during boom periods.

However, a growing number of miners' representatives argued that the sliding scale tied workers' fortunes too closely to market forces beyond their control, and prevented collective bargaining over wage levels. This division was not merely tactical but reflected deeper philosophical differences about the nature of industrial relations and the role of trade unions in a capitalist economy.

=== The joint committee of 1892 ===
The breakthrough came in 1892, when representatives from both sliding scale and non-sliding scale unions agreed to form a joint committee. This marked the first serious attempt at coordinated action across the South Wales coalfield since the collapse of the AAM. The committee's composition reflected the geographical and ideological diversity of the miners' movement: sliding scale districts were represented by William Abraham, David Beynon, Thomas Davies, Daronwy Isaac, J. Jones, David Morgan, Alfred Onions and Morgan Weeks, whilst the non-sliding scale districts sent David Ajax, John Davies, J. Edwards, Joseph Phillips and M. Williams.

Thomas Richards was elected as secretary, marking the beginning of his influential career in the miners' movement. The following year, Abraham was elected as president, David Morgan as vice-president, and Josiah Edwards as treasurer. Although this joint committee achieved little in practical terms, it established the personal relationships and organisational framework that would prove essential for the creation of the SWMF six years later.

=== The weakness of fragmented unionism ===
Prior to 1898, the fragmented nature of trade union organisation in South Wales severely limited its effectiveness. Chris Williams's research demonstrates that despite the coalfield's rapid growth, union membership remained disappointingly low: between 1892 and 1897, no more than 18% of the South Wales coalfield workforce were union members. This figure compared unfavourably not only with the British average of 39%, but was significantly lower than other major coalfields: Scotland achieved 25% unionisation, Yorkshire 58%, and the north-east of England 59%.

This organisational weakness left individual collieries vulnerable to employer pressure and made coordinated industrial action virtually impossible. The defeat of the 1898 miners' strike finally convinced the scattered local unions that only through amalgamation could they hope to match the growing power and coordination of the coal owners. It was from this recognition of collective weakness that the South Wales Miners' Federation would emerge as one of the most powerful and influential trade unions in British history.

== Foundation ==
=== The 1898 strike and its aftermath ===
The catalyst for the formation of the South Wales Miners' Federation was the disastrous miners' strike of 1898, a six-month struggle that fundamentally transformed the landscape of industrial relations in the South Wales coalfield. The strike began in April 1898 as an attempt by the miners to abolish the sliding scale system, which tied their wages directly to the fluctuating price of coal without any guaranteed minimum.

Despite widespread support across the coalfield, the strike quickly deteriorated into a lockout as coal owners responded with intransigence, determined to maintain their control over wage determination.

The defeat was comprehensive and demoralising. After six months without wages, the miners were forced to accept not only the continuation of the sliding scale but also the loss of "Mabon's Day" - the traditional first-Monday holiday that had been one of their few workplace privileges. The strike's failure exposed the fundamental weakness of the fragmented union structure that had characterised the South Wales coalfield since the collapse of the AAM in 1875. Individual local unions, depleted of funds and lacking coordination, had proved no match for the organised power of the coal owners.

=== The decision to amalgamate ===
The harsh lessons of 1898 convinced miners' leaders across South Wales that survival required unity. On 24 October 1898, just weeks after the strike's end, representatives of the scattered local unions gathered to form a single, powerful organisation. The timing was significant - the humiliation of defeat was still fresh, and the financial exhaustion of the constituent unions made amalgamation a practical necessity as much as a strategic choice.

The new federation represented the most ambitious attempt at miners' unity in Welsh history. Ten local unions agreed to dissolve themselves and transfer their membership, assets, and responsibilities to the new South Wales Miners' Federation:

Union	Founded	Joined	Membership (1892)	Membership (1898)
Aberdare, Merthyr and Dowlais Miners' Association	1882	1898	7,000	500
Anthracite Miners' Association	1882	1898	3,500	6,050
Cambrian Miners' Association	1872	1898	14,000 (1885)	10,000 (1893)
Colliery Enginemen and Stokers of Neath and District	1892	1900	55	186
Ebbw Vale and Sirhowy Colliery Workmen's Association	1884	1898	2,500	3,500
Garw Miners' Association	1880	1898	3,000 (1890)	
Monmouthshire and South Wales Miners' Association	1887	1898	6,059	70
Monmouth Western Valley Miners' Association	1897	1898	N/A	500
Rhymney Valley Miners' Association	1893	1898	2,500 (1893)	1,917
Western Miners' Association	1872	1898	4,540	5,588

=== Organisational transformation ===
Despite its name, the South Wales Miners' Federation was not a federation in the traditional sense of a loose alliance of independent unions. Instead, the constituent organisations were formally dissolved, their membership and assets transferred to a single, unified body. This represented a radical departure from previous attempts at miners' unity, which had typically preserved the autonomy of local unions whilst attempting to coordinate their activities.

The new organisation was structured around twenty districts, each based on the geographical boundaries of the former local unions but now operating as administrative divisions of the unified SWMF rather than independent entities. Each district was allocated one or more full-time agents, whose salaries and expenses were paid by the central federation. This ensured that the new union could maintain effective representation at the workplace level whilst coordinating policy and strategy from its headquarters in Cardiff.

Despite its name, the new union was not a federation; the former unions were dissolved and became the basis of twenty districts, each with one or more full-time agents. It had an immediate impact. By the end of 1898, the union had 60,000 members, or 47% of the coalfield workforce, and by 1900 this had risen to 127,894 or 87% of the workforce.

== Early development (1898–1914) ==
=== Immediate impact and growth ===
The transformation in miners' organisation was dramatic and immediate. By the end of 1898, just two months after its formation, the new union had recruited 60,000 members, representing 47% of the coalfield workforce. This figure rose to 127,894 by 1900, achieving the remarkable penetration rate of 87% of all miners in South Wales.

The SWMF's impact was revolutionary. By the end of 1898, just two months after its formation, the new union had recruited 60,000 members, representing 47% of the coalfield workforce. This figure rose to 127,894 by 1900, achieving the remarkable penetration rate of 87% of all miners in South Wales. Such rapid growth reflected not only the organisational advantages of unity but also the miners' determination to ensure that the humiliation of 1898 would never be repeated.

The federation's success in recruiting members where previous organisations had failed demonstrated the power of unified action and centralised resources. For the first time, South Wales miners possessed an organisation capable of matching the coordination and financial resources of the coal owners. The SWMF had emerged from the ashes of defeat to become one of the most powerful trade unions in Britain, fundamentally altering the balance of industrial power in the Welsh coalfield.

=== Affiliation to the MFGB ===
The new union affiliated to the Miners' Federation of Great Britain (MFGB) in 1899. This decision marked a crucial strategic shift for South Wales miners, integrating them into a national movement that could coordinate action across Britain's coalfields. The affiliation represented a rejection of the parochialism that had characterised the pre-1898 period, when local unions had operated in isolation from broader labour movements.

The timing of the affiliation was significant, coming during a period of expansion for the MFGB as it sought to unify miners across different coalfields behind common policies. For the SWMF, membership brought immediate benefits in terms of mutual support during disputes and access to the federation's accumulated expertise in industrial relations.

=== Political transformation ===
In the early twentieth century, the union's leadership were firmly aligned with the Liberal Party; MPs Thomas Richards, William Abraham, John Williams and William Brace all took the Liberal Party whip in parliament. This reflected the deep-rooted tradition of Welsh Liberalism, reinforced by shared nonconformist religious values and the party's historic commitment to Welsh causes.

However, this political alignment came under increasing strain as the SWMF's membership radicalised through experience of industrial conflict. When the MFGB held a ballot on affiliation to the Labour Party in 1906, a majority of SWMF members voted in favour, despite their leaders' Liberal loyalties. As the national federation narrowly voted against, another vote was held in 1908, by which time SWMF members voted 74,675 to 44,616 in favour - a decisive margin that reflected the growing influence of Labour activists within the federation.

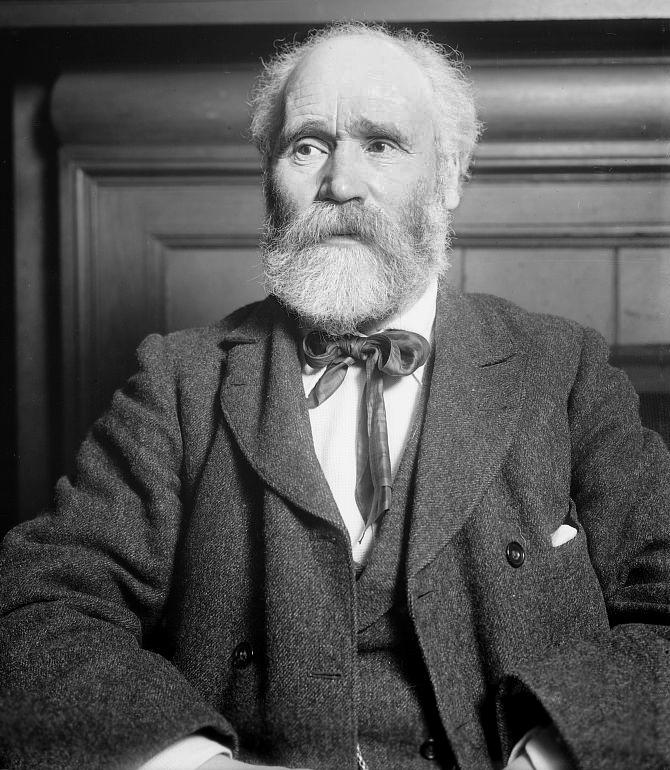
Keir Hardie, whose election as MP for Merthyr in 1900 symbolised the growing influence of the Labour Party among South Wales miners

This political transformation was accelerated by the emergence of a new generation of militant leaders who challenged the accommodationist approach of the Lib-Lab tradition. The Independent Labour Party had gained significant influence in the coalfield following the 1898 strike, and its activists played a crucial role in organising opposition to continued Liberal allegiance. The election of Keir Hardie as MP for Merthyr in 1900 provided a powerful symbol of this political realignment.

=== Industrial militancy and the Cambrian Combine Dispute ===
The federation's growing confidence was tested by a series of major industrial disputes that revealed both its strengths and the limitations of conventional trade union methods. The most significant of these was the Cambrian Combine strike of 1910-1911, which began when miners at the Ely Pit in Penygraig found lockout notices attached to their workplace entrances. The dispute rapidly escalated as the Naval Colliery Company, part of the Cambrian Combine business network, attempted to impose new working arrangements that miners viewed as an attack on established customs and earnings.

The conflict drew in the entire SWMF when a federation conference on 16 September 1910 voted to support the strikers, with 248 delegates representing 147,000 miners backing official action. By November 1910, over 30,000 miners were on strike, representing the largest industrial dispute in the coalfield since 1898. The dispute was particularly significant because it involved not merely wage negotiations but fundamental questions about managerial prerogatives and workers' control over the production process.

=== The Tonypandy Riots and state intervention ===
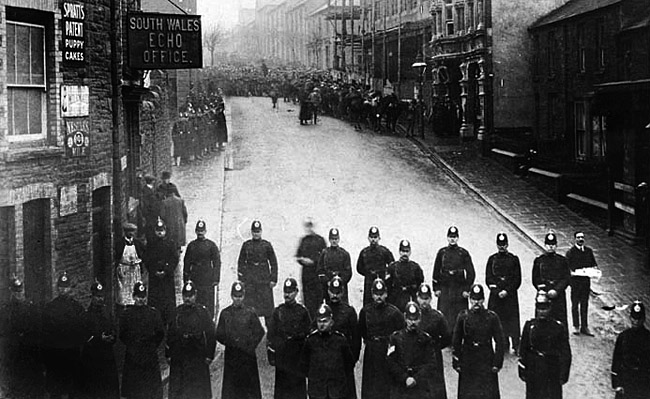
Police officers blocking a street during the Tonypandy Riots of 1910-1911, when striking miners clashed with authorities during the Cambrian Combine Dispute

The Cambrian Combine Dispute reached its climax with the Tonypandy Riot of November 1910, when striking miners attempted to shut down the Llwynypia colliery and encountered heavy police resistance. The confrontation escalated throughout the evening of 7 November, with miners throwing stones at police guarding the power station and breaking sections of wooden fencing to use as weapons. The police responded with repeated baton charges, eventually pushing the strikers back into Tonypandy square where further violence erupted.

The crisis prompted the police authorities to request military reinforcements from Tidworth barracks. Home Secretary Winston Churchill's decision to send forces became a source of lasting controversy, with many miners believing that military intervention had been prevented only by their own resistance.

The events at Tonypandy marked a watershed in the relationship between the SWMF and the British state. For the first time, the federation had been involved in a confrontation that brought the full apparatus of state coercion to bear against striking workers.

=== The emergence of syndicalist influence ===
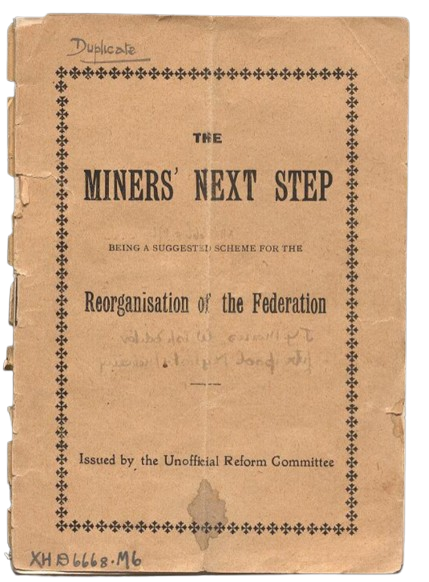
Cover of "The Miners' Next Step" (1912), the influential syndicalist pamphlet produced by the Unofficial Reform Committee that challenged the SWMF's leadership and advocated for workers' control of the coal industry

The aftermath of the Cambrian Combine Dispute saw the emergence of a vocal syndicalist current within the SWMF, crystallised in the publication of The Miners' Next Step in 1912. This influential pamphlet, produced by the Unofficial Reform Committee based in Tonypandy, challenged the federation's existing leadership and advocated for more militant tactics based on direct action rather than parliamentary politics.

The document represented a fundamental critique of the accommodationist policies that had characterised the SWMF leadership since 1898. It argued that the federation had become too bureaucratic and that real power should rest with the rank-and-file miners rather than professional union officials. The syndicalist programme called for the elimination of coal owners altogether and the establishment of democratic workers' control over the mining industry.

Whilst the syndicalists never gained control of the SWMF, their influence was significant in pushing the federation towards more militant policies and in challenging the dominance of the Liberal-Labour tradition. The publication of The Miners' Next Step marked South Wales as a centre of radical trade union thinking that would influence labour movements far beyond the coalfield. These syndicalist ideas would later flourish in mining communities such as Maerdy, which became renowned for its radical politics and earned the nickname "Little Moscow" during the interwar period.

== War and interwar struggles (1914-1945) ==
=== World War I and state control ===
The outbreak of the First World War in August 1914 dramatically transformed the relationship between the SWMF, the coal industry, and the British state. In March 1917, the government nationalised the coal mines, bringing them under direct state control for the first time in British history. This wartime measure was driven by the strategic importance of coal to the war effort and the need to maximise production whilst maintaining industrial peace.

For the SWMF, government control brought significant improvements in working conditions and wages. Miners received an 18.5% wage increase during the war, and the eight-hour day was established across the coalfield. The federation's membership expanded as the union benefited from official recognition and the government's need to maintain production. These gains reinforced the SWMF's growing conviction that public ownership represented the solution to the industry's chronic problems.

The war also accelerated the political radicalisation of the federation. The Russian Revolution of 1917 was enthusiastically received in many South Wales mining communities, whilst the experience of state control during wartime demonstrated the feasibility of alternatives to private ownership. By 1918, the SWMF had committed itself unequivocally to nationalisation as its central political demand.

The return of peace in November 1918 brought immediate challenges to the gains won during wartime. On 31 March 1921, Prime Minister David Lloyd George returned the mines to private ownership, despite apparent wartime promises to maintain public control. The coal owners immediately sought to reverse wartime improvements, demanding wage cuts and longer hours to restore profitability in an increasingly competitive international market.

=== Black Friday ===
The SWMF's response was to invoke the Triple Alliance with the transport workers and railway unions, threatening coordinated strike action to resist the cuts. However, on 15 April 1921 - subsequently known as "Black Friday" - the alliance collapsed when the railway and transport unions withdrew their support at the crucial moment. The miners were left to fight alone, and after eleven weeks of bitter struggle were forced to accept district wage settlements and cuts ranging between 10 and 40 percent across different areas of the coalfield.

The defeat of 1921 was particularly devastating because it signalled the beginning of a systematic assault on trade union gains across British industry. As the SWMF had feared, the miners' defeat "heralded a sweeping round of wage reductions that affected some 6 million workers" throughout the country. The lessons of Black Friday would profoundly influence the federation's strategy in subsequent confrontations.

=== The 1926 General Strike and miners' lockout ===
The most significant industrial confrontation in the SWMF's history began on 30 April 1926, when coal owners locked out miners who refused to accept further wage cuts and an increase in working hours from seven to eight hours per day. The owners' demands were based on the recommendations of a Royal Commission which concluded that the British coal industry required fundamental reorganisation to compete with cheaper foreign coal.

On 3 May 1926, the Trades Union Congress (TUC) called a General Strike in support of the locked-out miners, bringing out over three million workers across Britain. For nine days, the country was brought to a virtual standstill as railway workers, transport workers, dockers, printers, and workers in heavy industry demonstrated unprecedented solidarity with the miners. In South Wales, the strike was almost universally observed, with entire communities mobilising to support the mining families.

However, on 12 May 1926, the TUC called off the General Strike without consulting the miners, accepting government assurances of fair treatment that were never honoured. The SWMF, feeling betrayed by their allies, continued the struggle alone for a further seven months. The lockout became a test of endurance between the miners and the coal owners, with mining families surviving on soup kitchens, charity, and the solidarity of their communities.

The defeat, when it finally came in November 1926, was comprehensive. Miners were forced to return to work on the owners' terms, accepting wage cuts and the eight-hour day whilst gaining none of their demands for improved conditions or recognition of union rights. The 1926 lockout represented not just an industrial defeat but a fundamental shift in the balance of power within British society, marking the end of the post-war militant phase of the labour movement.

=== Depression and unemployment ===
The aftermath of 1926 brought unprecedented hardship to the South Wales coalfield. Between 1921 and 1936, 241 mines closed and the number of miners fell from 270,000 to 130,000. Entire communities that had been built around single collieries faced destitution as pits closed and alternative employment remained scarce.

The SWMF was forced to adapt to representing a workforce devastated by unemployment whilst maintaining organisation among those still in work. The federation played a crucial role in organising relief efforts, coordinating soup kitchens, and lobbying for government assistance. Three major hunger marches from South Wales to London in 1927, 1934, and 1936 demonstrated the federation's continued capacity for political mobilisation despite economic defeat.

=== Reorganisation of 1934 ===
The number of districts gradually increased, to a peak of twenty, then with the abolition of the tiny Saundersfoot district, continued at nineteen until 1934. By this point, most districts were struggling financially, and so a complete restructure took place. The districts were replaced by eight areas, employing one or more agents, but otherwise much less important, governance moving to the level of the combine or lodge.

District (to 1933)	Forerunner	Membership (1914)	Area (from 1934)	Headquarters
Anthracite	Anthracite Miners' Association	10,856	No.1: Anthracite	Swansea
Western	Western Miners' Association	7,330	No.1: Anthracite	Swansea
Afan Valley	Created 1908	2,600	No.2: Afan Valley	Port Talbot
Garw	Garw Miners' Association	3,747	No.3: Garw	Bridgend
Maesteg	Created 1898	5,435	No.3: Garw	Bridgend
Ogmore and Gilfach	Created 1903	2,077	No.3: Garw	Bridgend
Pontypridd and Rhondda	Created 1898	3,422	No.4: Rhondda	Porth
Rhondda No.1	Cambrian Miners' Association	18,956	No.4: Rhondda	Porth
Aberdare	Aberdare, Merthyr and Dowlais Miners' Association	4,903	No.5: Merthyr, Aberdare and Dowlais	Aberdare
Dowlais	Aberdare, Merthyr and Dowlais Miners' Association	2,482	No.5: Merthyr, Aberdare and Dowlais	Aberdare
Merthyr	Aberdare, Merthyr and Dowlais Miners' Association	2,257	No.5: Merthyr, Aberdare and Dowlais	Aberdare
Taff and Cynon	Created 1899	3,376	No.5: Merthyr, Aberdare and Dowlais	Aberdare
East Glamorgan	Created 1898	3,529	No.6: Rhymney Valley	Bargoed
Rhymney Valley	Rhymney Valley Miners' Association	6,367	No.6: Rhymney Valley	Bargoed
Ebbw Vale	Ebbw Vale and Sirhowy Colliery Workmen's Association	4,000	No.7: Tredegar	Pontllanfraith
Tredegar Valley	Created 1898	10,051	No.7: Tredegar	Pontllanfraith
Blaina	Created 1899	4,284	No.8: Blaina and West Monmouth	Crumlin
Eastern Valleys	Created 1899	6,155	No.8: Blaina and West Monmouth	Crumlin
Monmouth Western Valleys	Monmouth Western Valley Miners' Association	10,731	No.8: Blaina and West Monmouth	Crumlin
Saundersfoot	Created 1900	356	Dissolved by 1926	

=== The rise of Communist influence ===
The failures of 1921 and 1926, combined with mass unemployment, radicalised many SWMF members and created space for Communist influence within the federation. Mining communities such as Maerdy became centres of radical politics, with Communist councillors elected to local authorities and the village earning the nickname "Little Moscow" for its rejection of established political authority.

The Communist Party of Great Britain gained significant influence within the SWMF during the 1930s, particularly among younger miners who had experienced unemployment and felt betrayed by the Labour Party's moderate leadership. Communist-led organisations such as the National Unemployed Workers' Movement played important roles in organising resistance to government policies and coordinating relief efforts for mining families.

This political radicalisation was reflected in the federation's increasing support for international causes, particularly the Spanish Civil War. Many South Wales miners volunteered for the International Brigades, seeing the fight against fascism in Spain as linked to their own struggles against economic oppression at home. The SWMF's support for Republican Spain demonstrated how local industrial struggles had become increasingly connected to broader international political movements.

=== World War II and the road to nationalisation ===
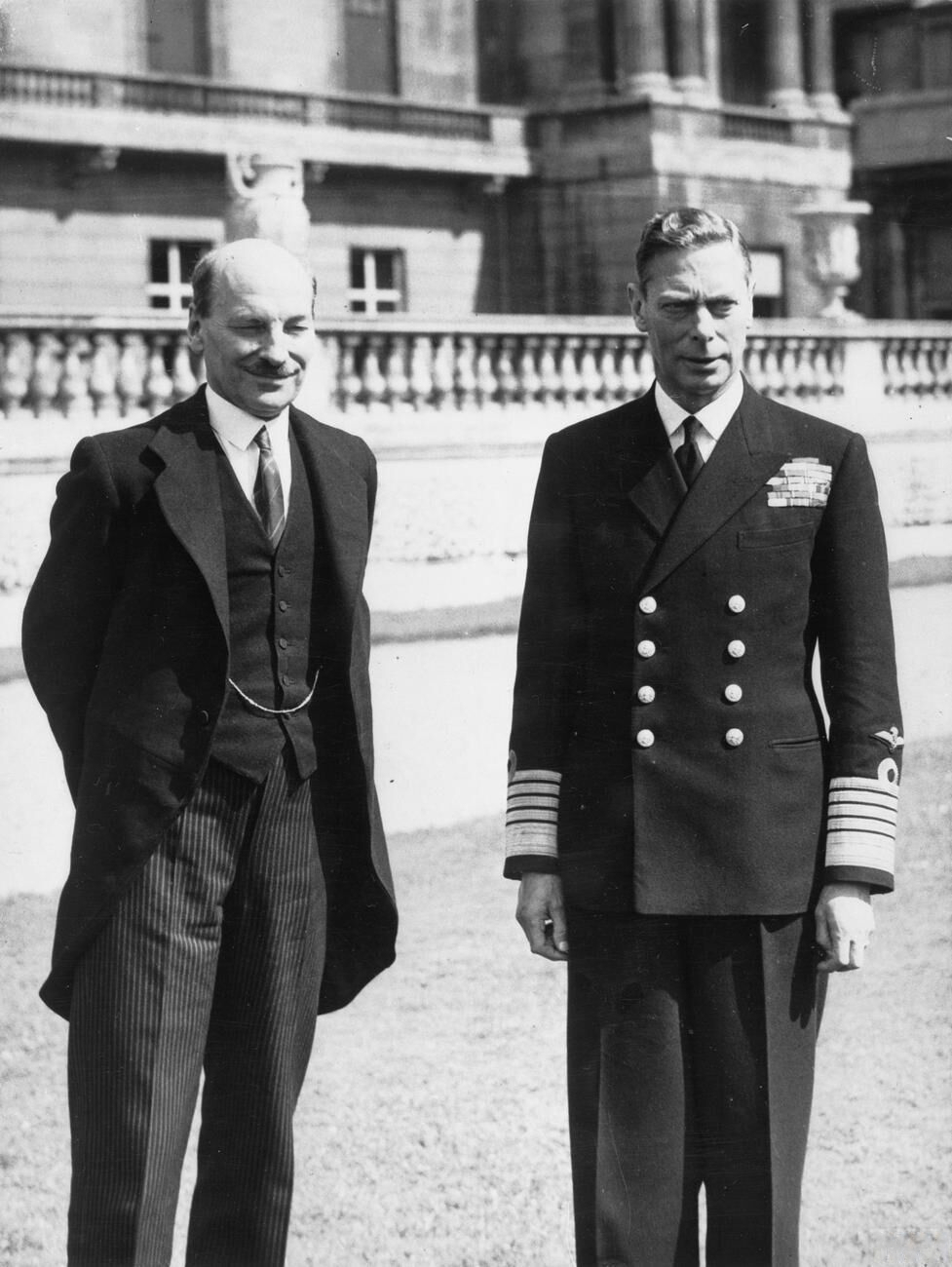
Prime Minister Clement Attlee (left) with King George VI. Attlee's Labour government, elected in 1945, fulfilled the SWMF's long-standing demand for nationalisation of the coal industry in 1947

The outbreak of the Second World War in 1939 once again transformed the position of the coal industry and the SWMF. Unlike in 1914-1918, the mines remained under private ownership, but government control over production and distribution was extensive. The federation initially maintained a cautious attitude towards the war effort, reflecting both pacifist traditions within the labour movement and suspicion of government motives.

However, the German invasion of the Soviet Union in June 1941 transformed Communist attitudes towards the war, and this shift was reflected in increased SWMF cooperation with the government's production drives. The federation used its influence to ensure that wartime conditions did not repeat the exploitation experienced during 1914-1918, whilst building support for post-war nationalisation.

The 1945 general election victory of the Labour Party, committed to nationalising the coal industry, represented the fulfilment of a demand the SWMF had pursued for over quarter of a century. On 1 January 1947, the coal mines would finally pass into public ownership, marking the end of an era of private ownership that had been characterised by conflict, exploitation, and economic instability.

For the South Wales Miners' Federation, nationalisation represented vindication of their long struggle for industrial democracy and social justice.

== Transition to the NUM ==
Badge of the South Wales Area of the National Union of Mineworkers, which the SWMF became in 1945.

The National Union of Mineworkers (NUM), and the Fed became the NUM (South Wales Area), with considerably less autonomy than before. The new structure centralised decision-making in the national executive, reducing the independence that had characterised the SWMF since its foundation in 1898.

The long-awaited nationalisation of the coal industry was implemented on 1 January 1947, bringing the mines under the control of the newly established National Coal Board. For the South Wales miners, this represented the fulfilment of a demand they had pursued for nearly three decades, though the reality of state ownership proved more bureaucratic and less democratic than many had envisioned.

During the 1960s and 1970s, the NUM regained its militant reputation through successful national strikes in 1972 and 1974 that brought down Edward Heath's Conservative government and demonstrated the continued industrial power of organised miners.

However, the union's final confrontation came with the 1984-85 miners' strike against Margaret Thatcher's pit closure programme. Despite fierce resistance, particularly in South Wales where the strike was almost universally observed, the year-long dispute ended in decisive defeat.

The strike's failure opened the way for mass pit closures across the coalfield, effectively ending a century of coal mining as the dominant industry in South Wales. By the early 1990s, the valleys that had once employed over 250,000 miners were left with only a handful of working collieries, marking the end of an era that had begun with the formation of the South Wales Miners' Federation in 1898.

== Splits and expansion ==
Over the years, there were a few splits from the union. The Monmouthshire and South Wales Colliery Enginemen, Stokers and Surface Craftsmen's General Association left in 1903. The South Wales Miners' Industrial Union, a moderate breakaway union was set up in 1926 in opposition to the General Strike but was disbanded in 1938.

In 1940, the SWMF also started representing miners in the Forest of Dean. In 1960, the South Wales Area was expanded to include the Somerset coalfield.

== Leadership ==
=== Presidents ===
1898: William Abraham
1912: William Brace
1920: James Winstone
1922: Vernon Hartshorn
1924: Enoch Morrell
1934: James Griffiths
1936: Arthur Horner
1946: Alf Davies
1951: Will Paynter
1959: William Whitehead
1966: Glyn Williams
1973: Emlyn Williams
1986: Des Dutfield
1991: Position abolished

=== Secretaries ===
1898: Thomas Richards
1931: Oliver Harris
1941: Evan Williams
1943: W. J. Saddler
1946: Evan Williams
1947: William Arthur
1951: W. H. Crews
1958: D. D. Evans
1963: Dai Francis
1976: George Rees
1997: Wayne Thomas

=== Vice presidents ===
1898: William Brace
1912: James Winstone
1921: Enoch Morrell
1925: S. O. Davies
1934: Arthur Jenkins
1935: W. J. Saddler
1943: Alf Davies
1946: Will Arthur
1947: W. H. Crews
1953: D. D. Evans
1957: Glyn Williams
1967: Emlyn Williams
1974: George Rees
1976: Will Haydn Thomas
1981: Des Dutfield
1984: Terry Thomas
1989:

== Sources ==
- Archives Hub. South Wales Miners Federation. Jisc.
- Arnot, Robin Page (1967). South Wales Miners. London: George Allen & Unwin.
- Chase, Malcolm (2000). "Early Trade Unionism: Fraternity, Skill and the Politics of Labour". International Review of Social History. 45 (2): 221–248. doi:10.1017/S0020859000115582.
- Cole, G. D. H. (1937). "Some Notes on British Trade Unionism in the Third Quarter of the Nineteenth Century". International Review for Social History. 2: 1–28.
- "Coal Society - A History of the South Wales Mining Valleys 1840-1980". GENUKI.
- Curtis, Ben (2007). The South Wales Miners: 1964-1985. Pontypridd: University of Glamorgan.
- Curtis, Ben; Thompson, Steven (2016). "For our common cause: Sexuality and left politics in South Wales, 1967–1985". Contemporary British History. 30 (2): 218–241. doi:10.1080/13619462.2015.1073591.
- Davidson, Roger (1972). "Llewellyn Smith, the labour department and government growth". Studies in the growth of nineteenth century government: 227–262.
- Daunton, M. J. (1981). "Down the Pit: Work in the Great Northern and South Wales Coalfields, 1870–1914". Economic History Review. 34 (4): 578–597. doi:10.2307/2595582.
- Daunton, M. J. (1980). "Miners' Houses: South Wales and the Great Northern Coalfield, 1880–1914". International Review of Social History. 25 (2): 143–175. doi:10.1017/S0020859000006271.
- Davies, John; Jenkins, Nigel; Baines, Menna; Lynch, Peredur (2008). The Welsh Academy Encyclopaedia of Wales. Cardiff: University of Wales Press. ISBN 978-0-7083-1953-6.
- Edwards, Ness (1938). History of the South Wales Miners' Federation. London: Laurence and Wishart.
- Francis, Hywel; Smith, David (1980). The Fed: A History of the South Wales Miners in the Twentieth Century. London: Lawrence and Wishart.
- Gilbert, David (1992). "Class, Community, and Collective Action: Social Change in Two British Coalfields, 1850–1926". Economic History Review. 45 (2): 295–317. doi:10.2307/2598237.
- Glocker, Theodore W. (1915). "Amalgamation of Related Trades in American Unions". American Economic Review. 5 (3): 554–575. doi:10.2307/1813842.
- Greasley, David (1985). "Wage Rates and Work Intensity in the South Wales Coalfield, 1874–1914". Economica. 52 (207): 383–389. doi:10.2307/2553806.
- Howell, Chris (2005). Trade Unions and the State: The Construction of Industrial Relations Institutions in Britain, 1890–2000. Vol. 59. pp. 268–287. doi:10.1177/001979390505900206.
- Howell, David (1983). British Workers and the Independent Labour Party, 1888-1906. Manchester: Manchester University Press.
- Lewis, E.D. (1959). The Rhondda Valleys. London: Phoenix House.
- Marsh, Arthur; Ryan, Victoria (1987). Historical Directory of Trade Unions. Vol. 2. Aldershot: Gower.
- Morris, J. H.; Williams, L. J. (1958). The South Wales Coal Industry 1841–75. Cardiff: University of Wales Press.
- North West Labour History Society. Portraits of 19th Century Lancashire Miners Leaders. North West Labour History Society.
- Price, Richard (1980). "Masters, unions and men: work control in building and the rise of Labour, 1830–1914". Economic History Review. 33 (4): 556–574. doi:10.2307/2595386.
- "South Wales Coalfield Timeline". Coalfield Web Materials.
- Staniforth, J.M. (1898). Cartoons of the Welsh Coal Strike: April 1st to September 1st. Cardiff.
- Taylor, A. J. (1955). "The Miners' Association of Great Britain and Ireland, 1842–48: A Study of the Problem of Integration". Economica. 22 (85): 45–60. doi:10.2307/2551825.
- Thompson, Steven (2012). "The friendly and welfare provision of British trade unions: a case study of the South Wales Miners' Federation". Labour History Review. 77 (2): 189–210.
- Treble, John G. (1987). "Sliding Scales and Conciliation Boards: Risk Sharing in the Late Nineteenth Century Coal Industry". Oxford Economic Papers. 39 (4): 679–698. doi:10.1093/oxfordjournals.oep.a041870.
- Webb, Sidney; Webb, Beatrice (1894). The History of Trade Unionism. London: Longmans, Green & Co.
- Walters, Rhodri (1975). "Labour Productivity in the South Wales Steam Coal Industry, 1870–1914". Economic History Review. 28 (2): 280–303. doi:10.2307/2594616.
- Williams, Chris (1998). Captalism, Community and Conflict. The South Wales Coalfield 1898-1947. Cardiff: University of Wales Press.
