= Amalgamated Association of Miners =

- Predecessor: Miners' National Union
- Successor: Miners' National Union
- Founded: 23 August 1869
- Dissolved: 24 August 1875
- Location: United Kingdom

The Amalgamated Association of Miners (AAM) was formed in 1869 in Lancashire, at a time of increasing industrial conflict in the British coalfields.

== History ==
The union was founded by Thomas Halliday and William Pickard, two miners' union agents who had grown disillusioned with the cautious approach of the Miners' National Union (MNU) of Alexander Macdonald. In contrast, they placed an emphasis on being a centralised union, offering systematic support for local strikes. Founded on 23 August 1869, Halliday served as its president, and he called a national conference for January 1870.

The 1870 conference attracted delegates from Wales and Staffordshire, in addition to Lancashire, and established it as a national organisation. While differing from Macdonald's union, it was happy to collaborate on matters of mutual agreement, and Macdonald spoke at several AAM conferences.

By June 1871, the union had 9,000 members in the Aberdare and Rhondda valleys, and in the same year won a major twelve-week strike in Aberdare and the Rhondda in 1871, cementing its position in South Wales.

A second major strike in South Wales in 1873 was also successful, while miners in Lancashire saw their wages rise greatly without having to take industrial action. However, from mid-1873, mine-owners formed their own organisations to target the union, while a downturn in the industry combined to see the union decline.

In 1874, Halliday sought election as MP for Merthyr Boroughs but although he polled well he was comfortably defeated by the sitting Liberal members, Henry Richard and Richard Fothergill.

The last great industrial battle fought by the AAM was in 1874 but Halliday's hardline stance was rejected by the majority of his followers. Thereafter the AAM went into rapid decline. By 1875, it was bankrupt. It was dissolved at a conference held in Shrewsbury on 24 August, with members advised to join the MNU, and Halliday taking a place on its committee.

In 1877, a new Amalgamated Association of Miners was formed, based on the surviving districts in South Wales. Halliday was again secretary, while William Abraham was president, and Edward Williams of Aberdare was treasurer. Although Halliday devoted three years to the union, it was unsuccessful.

== Districts ==
By the 1873 conference, the union claimed 99,399 members, located in a large number of districts. The union's policy was to admit miners in any unrepresented location as a new district, then in the longer term, to merge small districts together.

District	Founded	Membership (1873)	1873 delegates
Aberavon	?	819	David Rees
Aberdare	1871	9,600	J. Griffiths, H. Harries, H. Hopkins, J. Jonathan, R. Jones, W. Lewis, W. Medlicott, G. Mills, David Morgan, J. Price, J. Robson, Henry Thomas, J. Thomas, N. Thomas, G. Vatie, W. Whitcombe, D. Williams, M. Williams, G. Woodford
Abersychan	1872	1,582	John Dagger, William Williams
Abertillery	1871	2,736	W. Allsopp, W. Burland, S. Jones, S. Lewis, J. Morgan, A. Phillips
Argoed	?	248	John A. Lloyd
Begelly	?	316	Isaac Thomas
Blackwood	?	239	None
Blaenavon	?	1,016	Thomas Griffiths, Levi Parry
Bristol	?	2,320	G. Bright, J. Burlton, G. Ford, S. Smith, J. Spicer
Brynmawr	?	2,111	Joseph Baugh, James William Fairbanks, Joseph Palmer
Burnley and Church	?	1,460	Thomas Beaumont, Jabez Edwards
Caerphilly	?	462	Thomas Willis
Cannock Chase	?	2,701	J. Edwards, W. Legert, L. Humphreys, George Pickard, J. Southall, E. Townsend
Cwmbran	?	951	Thomas Ephraim, Charles Vaughan
Darran	?	509	None
Farnworth and Kearsley	1869	2,520	J. Brooks, J. Fletcher, G. Gooke, B. Hall, R. Heyes, W. Hobson
Forest of Dean	1870	4,000	J. Bagott, R. Baker, G. Goode, J. Miles, Timothy Mountjoy, G. Sneensman, J. Thomas
Goginan	?	222	William Evans
Hollingwood	?	212	None
Llantwit and Taff's Well	?	1,265	Francis Edmunds, Daniel Morgan
Loughor	1872	3,393	William Abraham, W. Evans, D. Harris, J. Hughes, T. Morgan
Maesteg	?	1,213	William Evans
Maesycwmmer	?	102	None
Merthyr and Dowlais	?	4,056	Daniel Evans, Isaac Kernick, John Williams, William Williams
Neath	1869	2,010	James Jones, Benjamin Williams
New Tredegar	1871	878	E. Hughes, T. Lloyd
North Staffordshire	1869	8,800	J. Bayley, J. Berks, William Brown, D. Brunt, T. Clark S. Cumberbatch, E. Ellis, W. Elsby, Moses Foulkes, J. Johnson, J. Kidd, B. Langley, E. Lyons, T. McDermott, H. Oakes, H. Pierce, W. Pugh
North Wales	1871	3,192	Joseph Dodd, David Griffiths, Isaac Roberts, Isaac Llewellyn Thomas, John Evan Thomas, Amos Turley, William Venables
Ogmore	1871	542	None
Oldham	?	1,200	None
Old Tredegar	?	1,943	Richard Davies, Henry Jeffries
Pengam	?	503	George Bolton, Thomas Lawrence
Penmain	?	85	None
Radstock	1872	2,174	George Carter, T. Curtis, B. Fish, J. Hobs, J. Young
Rhondda Valley	1872	5,141	J. Andrews, G. Coles, D. Davies, E. Evans, J. Francis, Bethuel Heycock, Lewis Morgan, J. Salathil, J. Trucker, E. Williams
Rhymney	1871	1,570	W. Baker, J. D. Thomas, E. Williams
Salop	?	2,663	Edward Brock, Thomas Edwards, Benjamin Garadrell, John Jones, Enoch Potts
South Staffordshire	1869	5,810	G. Carter, L. E. Coleshill, R. Cotterell, Benjamin Dean, J. Fellows, C. Gething, W. Lloyd, H. Randall, T. Unstone, W. Westwood
St Helens and Haydock	?	2,128	Richard Marsh
Swansea Vale	?	2,150	David Edwards, John Stephens
Tamworth	?	1,124	John Albrighton, Josiah Baybould
West Bromwich	1869	3,260	J. Adams, Henry Barnes, J. Foy, Thomas Griffiths, H. Rust, J. Wadeley, S. Wilding
West Cumberland	1872	2,500	Andrew Sharp, James Simpson
Wigan	1862	6,856	J. Colinson, H. Highton, W. Higson, T. Oakes, G. Silcock
Worsley	?	800	George Seddon, Joseph Smith

== Sources ==
- Jones, Aled (1984). "Trade Unions and the Press. Journalism and the Red Dragon Revolt of 1874" (PDF). Welsh History Review. 12 (2): 197–224.
- Pretty, David A. (June 2001). "David Morgan ('Dai o'r Nant'), miners' agent. A Portrait of Leadership in the South Wales Coalfield". Welsh History Review. 20 (3): 495–531.
