= Miners' National Union =

Former trade union of the United Kingdom

The Miners' National Union (MNU) was a trade union which represented miners in Great Britain.

== History ==
The union was founded in November 1863 at a five-day long conference at the People's Hall in Leeds. It was originally known as the National Association of Coal, Lime and Ironstone Miners of Great Britain or Miners' National Association. It campaigned for legislation in the interests of its members, but did not involve itself in trade disputes, and disappointed strikers who hoped it would provide them with financial support. Its most prominent achievement was in getting the Coal Mines Regulation Act 1872 passed; this required payment of miners by weight and restricted working hours for children in the mines.

The Amalgamated Association of Miners was formed by former members of the union in 1869 and for a few years established new unions across the country. However, by 1875 it was in financial trouble and the two negotiated a merger; however, Macdonald ultimately only changed the name to the "Miners' National Union" and advised former members of the Amalgamated Association to join.

Trade unions affiliated to the union included the Derbyshire and Nottinghamshire Miners' Association, Durham Miners' Association, Northumberland Miners' Association, South Yorkshire Miners' Association and West Yorkshire Miners' Association. The union also worked closely with the Scottish Miners' Association, whose secretary was Alexander Macdonald, President of the MNU.

The union's affiliates in 1873 were:

Union	Founded	Affiliated	Membership (1873)
Ashton-under-Lyne	1869	1869	3,200
Cleveland	1872	1872	5,200
Derby and Leicestershire	1873	1873	1,400
Durham	1869	1869	35,000
Fife and Clackmannan	1869	1873	5,100
Northumberland	1863	1863	16,000
South Yorkshire	1858	1863	17,000
Stirling and Linlithgowshire	1872	1872	5,000
Warwickshire and Leicestershire	1872	1872	2,000
West Bromwich	1869	1873	4,000
West Yorkshire	1858	1863	10,000
Wishaw	1873	1873	1,400

By 1889, in addition to Northumberland and Durham, the newer Yorkshire Miners' Association, Derbyshire Miners' Association, Nottinghamshire Miners' Association, Ashton-under-Lyne Miners' Association and Monmouthshire and South Wales Miners' Association held membership. At that year's conference, the unions voted against involving itself with wage disputes, instead focusing on lobbying Parliament for reforms. However, it had no objection to the creation of a new organisation being created to intervene on industrial matters and, as a result, several affiliates were founder members of the Miners' Federation of Great Britain, the MNU then fading in importance.

In 1898, the Durham Miners and a few remaining minor bodies withdrew from the union; with only the Northumberland Miners still affiliated, the MNU was dissolved.

== Presidents ==
1863: Alexander Macdonald
1881: Thomas Burt

== Secretaries ==
1863: Richard Mitchell
1865: John Worrall
Philip Casey
1875: Thomas Halliday
1877: William Crawford
1890: John Wilson
