= Welsh coal strike of 1898 =

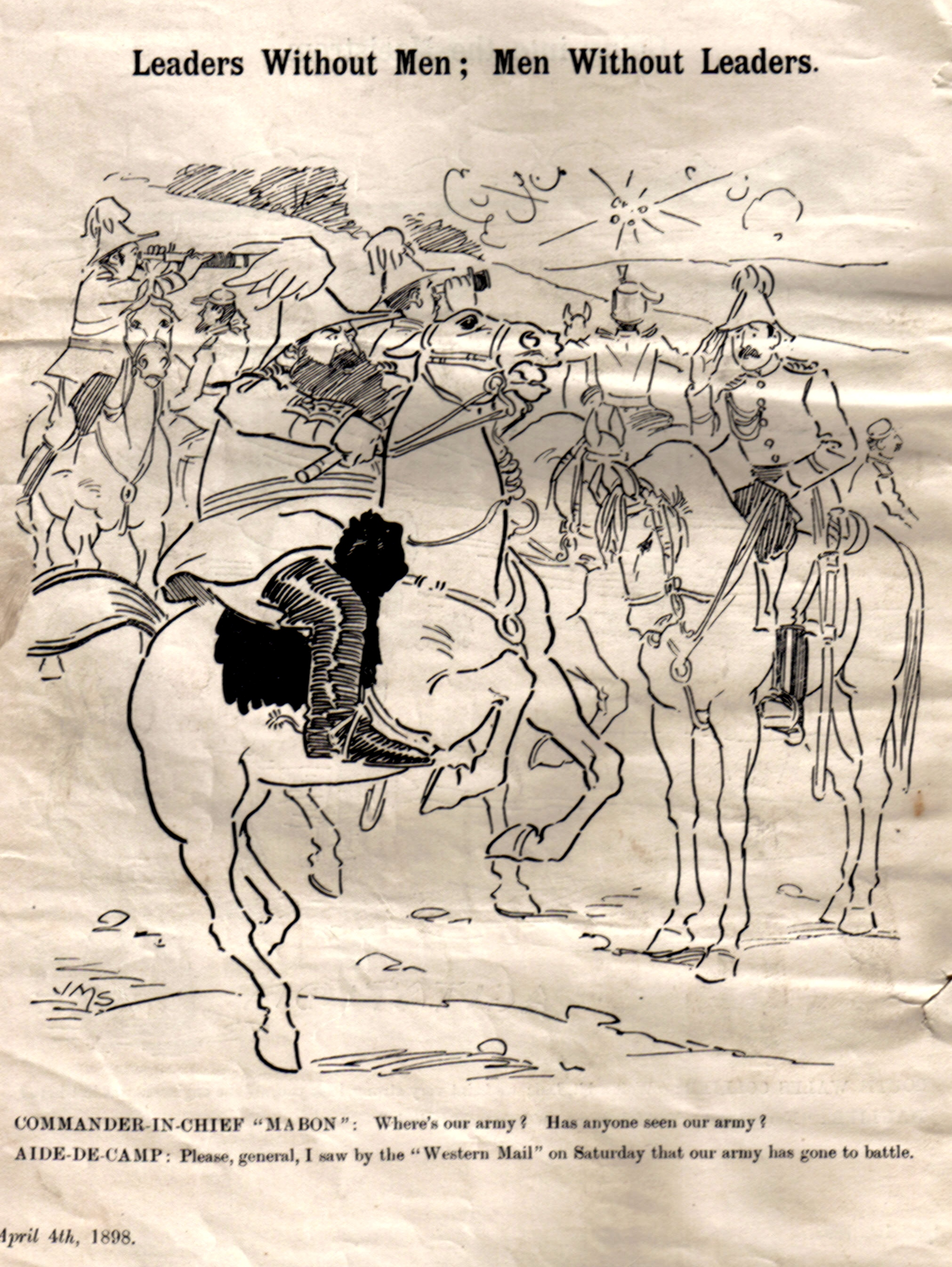
Western Mail Cartoon by JM Staniforth attacking the lack of communication between miners and their leaders at the start of the strike.

A coal strike involving the colliers of South Wales and Monmouthshire took place in 1898. The strike began as an attempt by the colliers to remove the sliding scale, which determined their wage based on the price of coal. The strike quickly turned into a disastrous lockout which would last for six months and result in a failure for the colliers as the sliding scale stayed in place. The strike is seen as an important landmark in Welsh history as it saw the true adoption of trade unionism in the southern coalfield which had been slow to take hold before then. The South Wales Miners' Federation was the largest trade union to have originated from this dispute.

== Reasons for the action ==
Towards the end of 1897 relations between south Wales colliers, led by Liberal MP William 'Mabon' Abraham and the coalowners had become strained. Apart from the obvious wealth of the coalowners, the miners were also unhappy about a system used to determine wages called the sliding scale. The sliding scale was a system whereby the collier's salary was based not only on how much coal they could mine but on the price the coal fetched at market. The miners argued that the scale could be abused by traders and did not prevent cut-throat competition; also there was no minimum to the scale. This led to many miners facing financial difficulties and in September 1897 the miners gave six months' notice to terminate the scale. The coalowners retaliated with what they described as, precautionary measures, to terminate contracts which would come into effect at the same time as the colliers' ultimatum.

== Attempts to resolve the strike ==
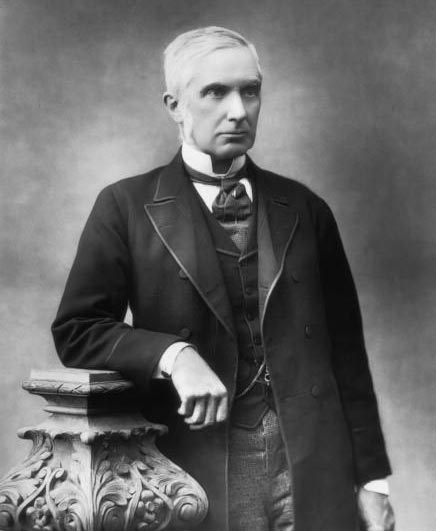
Sir Edward Fry, who acted as arbitrator.

Before the deadline for both actions passed in March 1898, negotiations began to prevent any action. The negotiations were still underway with the deadline of March 31 looming, so both parties agreed to extend talks until April 9. The discussions broke down before the deadline as the colliers refused the options being presented to them, and they walked out of the pits en masse. The miners' demands had been a minimum price per coal of 10 shillings a ton, a sliding scale of 10% not the 8.75% in operation, plus an immediate advance of 10%. The coalowners' compromise had been below those requested on all three demands.

In course of time, the miners shifted their position to the removal of the sliding scale completely but still demanded the 10% advance. The Board of Trade appointed Sir Edward Fry to act as a conciliator, much to the approval of the colliers, but the employers refused to meet with him. Through the endeavours of Sir Edward, the colliers eventually agreed to a reduction on demands in return for the creation of a neutral Concilliation Board to fix wages if coal prices fell below a specified level. The coalowners showed interest in these options but before options were discussed, the colliers' representatives re-introduced demands and negotiations were broken. After a second failed attempt, Sir Edward returned to the Board of Trade describing the owners as obstinate and the workers as leaderless.

== Outcome of the action ==
By August the colliers had decided to push on the single issue of retaining the sliding scale, but with a minimum level. In the end the colliers accepted an immediate advance of 5 percent and a guarantee from the coalowners that if wages fell below 12½ percent above the 1879 standard, then the men could give 6 months notice to terminate the scale. It also saw the end of Mabon's day, the first Monday of the month holiday previously awarded to the miners. The strike officially ended on 1 September 1898.

The lack of organisation and vision apparent from the colliers' leaders was addressed by the foundation of the South Wales Miners' Federation, or 'the Fed'. Abraham would take the presidency of the organisation and William Brace the vice president. After such a long strike without pay, the levels of militancy within the south Wales coalfields rose and men began joining trade unions on a level not before seen in the area.

== Bibliography ==
- Western Mail (1898). Cartoons of the Welsh Coal Strike, April 1st to September 1st, 1898. Cardiff: Western Mail Ltd.
- Davies, John; Jenkins, Nigel (2008). The Welsh Academy Encyclopaedia of Wales. Cardiff: University of Wales Press. ISBN 978-0-7083-1953-6.
- John, Arthur H. (1980). Glamorgan County History, Volume V, Industrial Glamorgan from 1700 to 1970. Cardiff: University of Wales Press.
