= Leonid Krasin =

Russian revolutionary, Soviet politician and diplomat (1870–1926)

- Леонид Красин
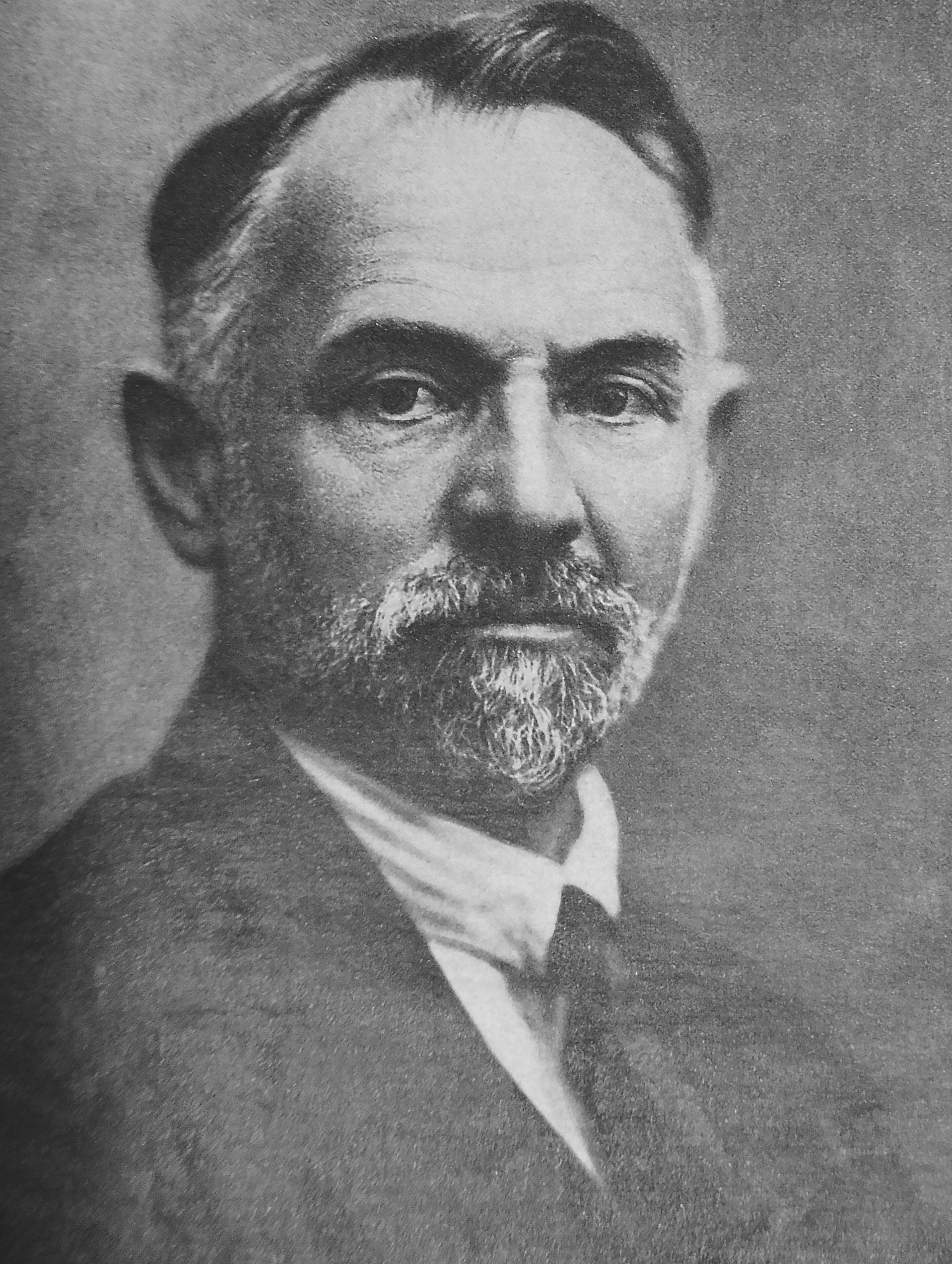
- Krasin in 1924

People's Commissar for Foreign Trade
- In office 6 July 1923 – 18 November 1925
- Premier: Alexei Rykov
- Preceded by: Position established
- Succeeded by: Alexander Tsiurupa

People's Commissar for Trade and Industry
- In office November 1918 – June 1920

People's Commissar for Transport
- In office March 1919 – December 1920

Personal details
- Born: Leonid Borisovich Krasin; 27 July 1870 Kurgan, Kurgansky Uyezd, Tobolsk Governorate, West-Siberian Governorate-General, Russian Empire (now Kurgan Oblast, Russian Federation)
- Died: 24 November 1926 (aged 56) London, England, United Kingdom
- Resting place: Kremlin Wall Necropolis, Moscow
- Citizenship: Russian Empire; Russian Republic; Russian Soviet Federative Socialist Republic; Soviet Union
- Party: RSDLP (1898–1903); RSDLP (Bolsheviks) (1903–1918); Russian Communist Party (Bolsheviks) (1918–1926)
- Education: Kharkov Technological Institute

Leonid Borisovich Krasin (Russian: Леони́д Бори́сович Кра́син; 27 July [O.S. 15 July] 1870 – 24 November 1926) was a Russian Soviet politician, engineer, social entrepreneur, Bolshevik revolutionary and a Soviet diplomat. In 1924 he became the first Soviet ambassador to France. A year later, he left Paris to become ambassador to London, where he remained until his death. He was an early and close associate of Vladimir Lenin and his financier and the first finance wizard of the Communist Party. Krasin died suddenly in London after having contracted pernicious anemia.

== Early years ==
Krasin was born on 27 July [O.S. 15 July] 1870 in Kurgan, Kurgansky Uyezd, Tobolsk Governorate, in the West-Siberian Governorate-General of the Russian Empire.

His father, Boris Ivanovich Krasin (1846–1901), was the local chief of police. The composer and Proletkult activist Boris Borisovich Krasin (1884–1936) was one of his younger brothers. He was educated at a technical school in Tyumen. He was a star pupil at school, and met the American explorer George Kennan when he visited Siberia.

In 1887, Krasin enrolled at the Petersburg Technological Institute, to study chemistry. He was briefly expelled from Saint Petersburg for his part in a student demonstration in 1890. On his return, in October, he joined a Marxist circle founded by Mikhail Brusnev, which was one of the first social democratic groups to make contact with factory workers. He was expelled from the Institute and banished from Petersburg again in 1891, for taking part in a student demonstration. He moved to Nizhny Novgorod where he started military service, only to be arrested in 1892 because of his link with Brusnev, and taken to Moscow, where he spent ten months in prison. After his release, he resumed military service in Tula. During a visit to St Petersburg, he delivered a talk to a Marxist circle organised by Stepan Radchenko, and was aggressively challenged by Vladimir Ulyanov, later known as Lenin, who was in the audience.

In 1893, Krasin visited Leo Tolstoy, the author of War and Peace, who lived nearby, but, according to Krasin's wife, Liubov, who was present, they argued so furiously about revolutionary politics that Tolstoy "began to stamp with rage." Later, Krasin also became friendly with the writer Maxim Gorky, who described Krasin as:

Thin and bony, shrewd-looking, his face for all the world like an old icon. When you looked into it, the pursed lips, wide nostrils and square brow with a deep furrow in the middle, revealed a man of Russian charm, at the same time with an energy that was not Russian.

Arrested again in January 1895, he spent three months in prison before being deported to Irkutsk, where he worked as a draughtsman on the Trans-Siberian Railway. He graduated from Kharkov Technological Institute in 1901.

== Career ==
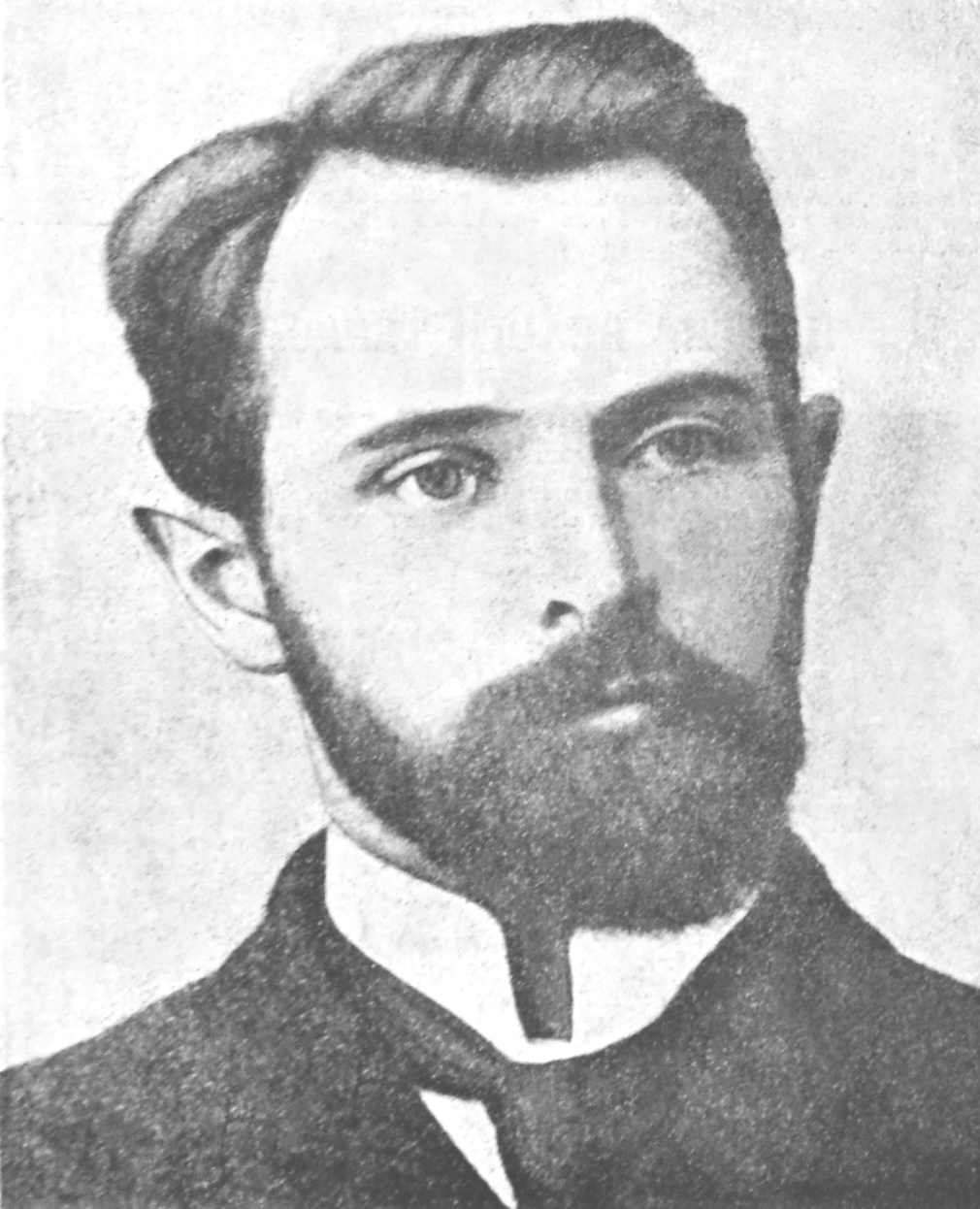
Leonid Krasin in Baku around 1903

On his release from exile in 1900, Krasin moved to Baku on the Caspian Sea, where he worked as an engineer in a large electric-power plant, and played an important role in the electrification of the Baku oilfields. In Baku he joined the underground Russian Social Democratic Labour Party (RSDLP). At its 2nd Congress in 1903, the RSDLP split into Menshevik and Bolshevik factions; Krasin supported the Bolsheviks, led by Lenin, and was elected to the Bolshevik Central Committee. In these early years he was "the most influential Leninist in the whole of Russia", although, unlike Lenin, Krasin was a 'conciliator' who hoped to re-unite the opposing factions of the RSDLP. He lived his double life as an apparently law-abiding factory-manager so convincingly that the workers at one point called for his dismissal, unaware that he was secretly helping produce the literature that encouraged them to resist.

Krasin raised the money from wealthy liberals that made it possible for the RSDLP to organise its first clandestine printing-press in Baku, a huge underground operation accessed by a disappearing trap-door designed by Krasin. This Nina Printing House, whose main operators were Lado Ketskhoveli and Avel Yenukidze, became for a period the main vehicle for Vladimir Lenin's newspaper Iskra. In the late 1930s, Soviet history-books were revised to attribute the founding and running of the printing-press to "Koba" Djughashvili (later known as Joseph Stalin), who also lived in Baku at the time.

After contracting malaria, Krasin left Baku in 1904 for the sake of his health. He obtained a job as the chief engineer for the industrialist, Savva Morozov who owned textile works in Orekhovo-Zuyevo, near Moscow, and to whom he had been introduced by Maxim Gorky. Morozov gave Krasin 2000 rubles per month to support the Bolsheviks and for other needs.

In April 1905 in London, Krasin chaired the Third Congress of the RSDLP, called to create a Bolshevik organisation that excluded Mensheviks and others, and was re-elected to the Central Committee. He was also the Bolsheviks' leading technical expert. His activities were a tight secret at the time. His wife, Liubov, whom he married in 1904, appears to have known nothing about them. In her memoirs, she wrote that Krasin went to Moscow on party business "quite frequently" but was "reticent" about what he was doing there. "It was only many years afterwards that I found out from his friends something about the personal dangers he used to run."

Martyn Liadov, who led the Moscow Bolsheviks in 1905–06, said in memoirs published in 1928 that Krasin organised the bank robberies conducted by Bolsheviks to raise funds, and participated in planning the 1907 Tiflis bank robbery, in Yerevan Square, during which forty people were killed and fifty injured. Liadov also said that the bomb used to blow up the home of the Russian Prime Minister, Pyotr Stolypin in 1906 was made under Krasin's direction.

Yuri Felshtinsky identified Leonid Krasin as the most likely assassin of Savva Morozov, who died on 26 May 1905 in Cannes, France, by gunshot wound.

In summer 1907, Krasin clashed with Lenin over whether the Bolsheviks should participate in elections to the Third Duma. During a conference near Vyborg, in July 1907, Krasin and Alexander Bogdanov led the call for a boycott. Lenin refused to concede, and the Bolshevik faction split, with Krasin supporting the Vpered faction. Lenin, who was usually acerbic in such circumstances, remained complimentary towards Krasin, and continued to exhort him to rejoin the Party.

In 1908, Krasin was arrested in Russian-controlled Finland and held in Vyborg prison for 30 days. Released due to the lack of evidence against him, he emigrated to Berlin, gave up revolutionary activity and focused on his career as an engineer, working for Siemens. In 1912, he was appointed manager of their Moscow office, and in 1914 was made managing director of the Russian subsidiary, based in Saint Petersburg. By now a wealthy man, he was approached by a mutual friend, George Soloman, who asked for a donation for Lenin. Krasin reportedly told him: "Lenin doesn't deserve help. He's a destructive type and you can never tell what wild scheme will suddenly emanate from his Tatar skull. To hell with him!"

During 1917, Krasin supported the Provisional Government, predicting that a Bolshevik revolution would bring a "rush headlong into anarchy", but early in 1918 he returned to the fold and rejoined the Bolsheviks. He was appalled by the Red Terror in September 1918, telling his wife that it was "one of the most disgusting acts of neo-Bolsheviks ... I had to fight for the release of at least thirty engineers - not a pleasant or easy job."

In the Russian Bolshevik government Krasin served as People's Commissar of Foreign Trade from 1920 to 1924.

=== Diplomatic career ===
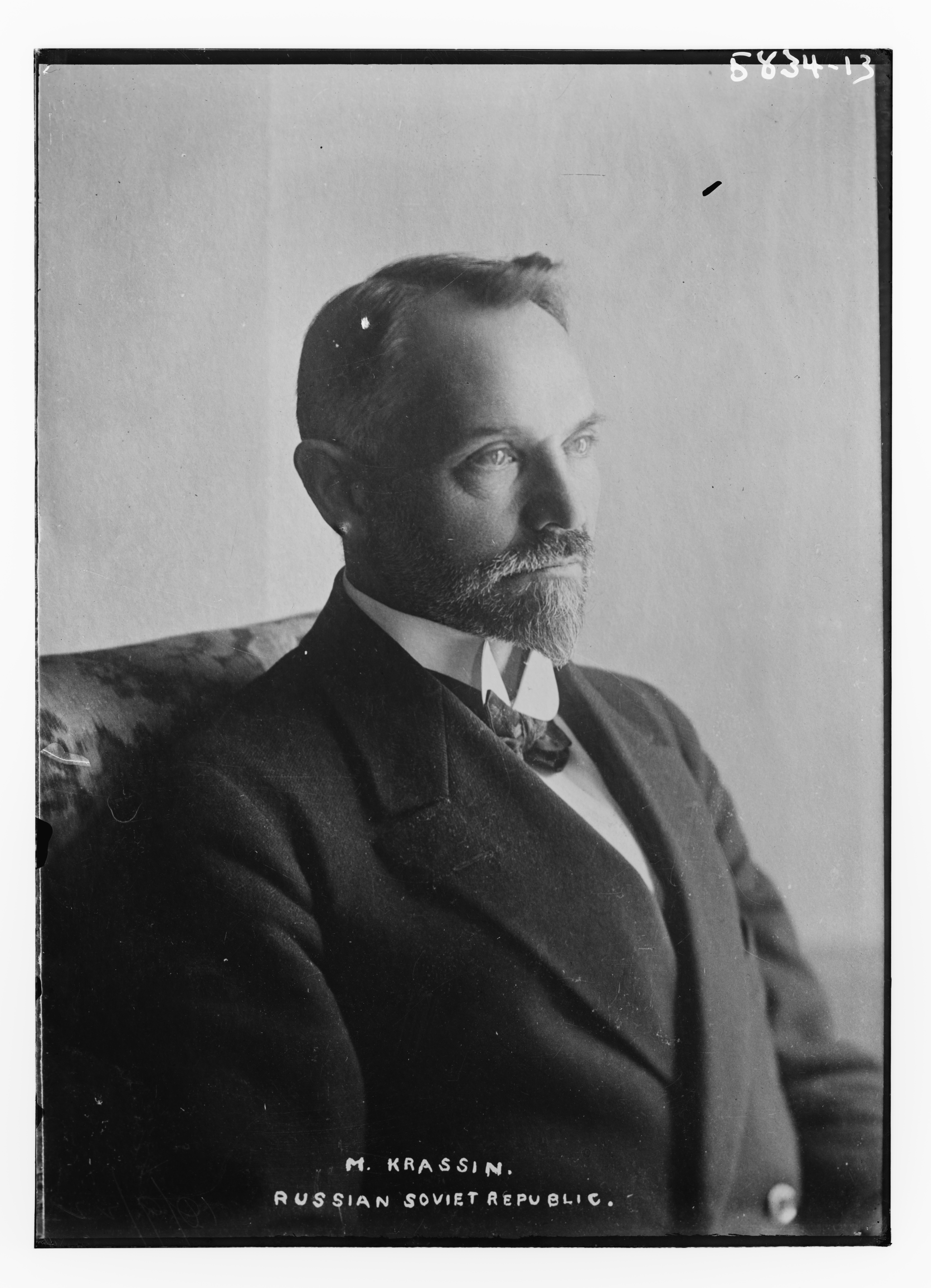
Leonid Krasin in 1920

Krasin met E. F. Wise in Copenhagen in April 1920. Wise was representing the Entente's Supreme Economic Council; with him Krasin negotiated the Anglo-Soviet Trade Agreement, signed in March 1921. In 1924 Krasin was elected to the Communist Party's Central Committee, an office he held until his death in 1926.

In Paris in 1921, he established the second Soviet overseas bank as the Commercial Bank for Northern Europe (French: Banque commerciale pour l'Europe du Nord) or BCEN-Eurobank. (Note: The five overseas "daughter" (Russian: "дочек") banks or "motherland bins" or "bins of the motherland" (Russian: Закрома Родины) were established in London (1919) as part of the Moscow Narodny Bank, in Paris (1921) as the BCEN-Eurobank, in Vienna (1974) as the Donau Bank AG, in Frankfurt am Main (1971) as the Ost-West Handelsbank (OWH), and in Luxembourg (1974) as the East-West United Bank, Luxembourg. In order to financially assist Communist Parties, anti-imperialism, and pro-national liberation movements worldwide, these banks acted as subsidiaries or daughters to their "mother" Gosbank, which was the central bank of Russian Soviet Federative Socialist Republic (Russia) from 1921 to 1922 and of the Soviet Union from 1923 to 1991.)

After Krasin's organized Bolshevik supporters obtained BCEN-Eurobank in Paris as the first overseas Soviet bank, he, as head of the Centrosoyuz mission, which was formed on 24 February 1920 and was an attempt by the Bolshevik's Council of People's Commissars to break through the trade and political blockade of Bolshevist Russia by Western countries, travelled to London, met with British authorities beginning on 31 May 1920, and established "Soviet House" or "Russia House" at 49 Moorgate in London, which was known as the All-Russian Cooperative Limited Liability Company "ARCOS" (Russian: ООО Всероссийское Кооперативное Общество, «АРКОС»). It supported Bolshevik control of the Moscow Narodny Bank in London, which had formed in October 1919, through Centrosoyuz as the next Soviet bank located overseas. (Note: Krasin served as the People's Commissar for Foreign Trade from 1920 to 1923, as the first plenipotentiary and trade representative for Bolshevik Russia in Great Britain from 1920 to 1925, and as the first plenipotentiary and trade representative for Bolshevik Russia in France from 1924 to 1925.)

In 1924, he became the first Soviet Ambassador to France. He left a year later to become the Soviet Plenipotentiary in London, where he died. Christian Rakovsky filled his role in London after his death.

=== Lenin's mausoleum ===
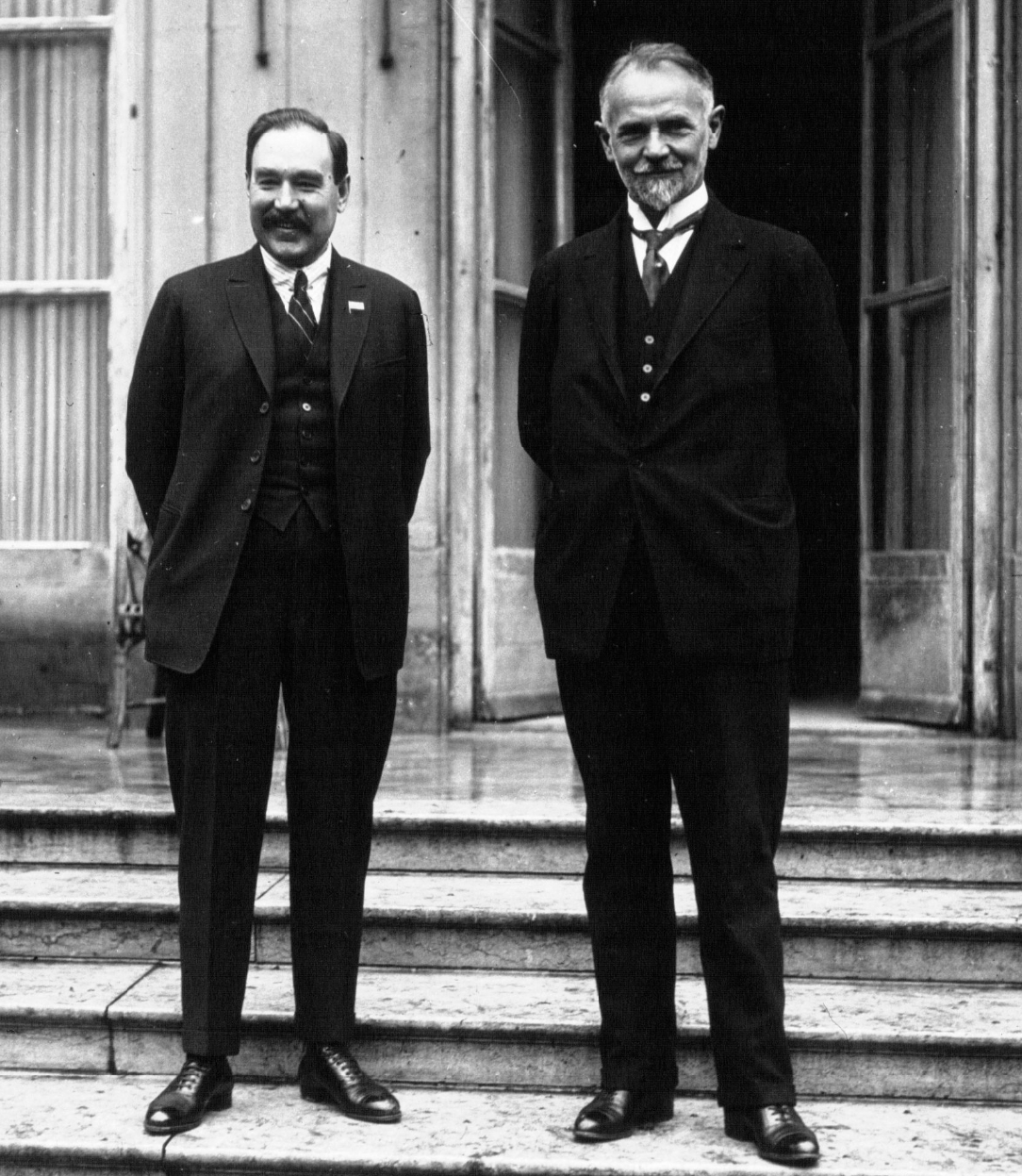
Leonid Krasin (on right) with Alexander Shliapnikov, photo taken in 1924.

Krasin, in the tradition of Nikolai Federov, believed in immortalization by scientific means. At the funeral of Lev Karpov in 1921, he said:

I am certain that the time will come when science will become all-powerful, that it will be able to recreate a deceased organism. I am certain that the time will come when one will be able to use the elements of a person's life to recreate the physical person. And I am certain that when that time will come, when the liberation of mankind, using all the might of science and technology, the strength and capacity of which we cannot now imagine, will be able to resurrect great historical figures- and I am certain that when that time will come, among the great figures will be our comrade, Lev Iakovlevich.

Lenin died in January 1924. Shortly afterwards Krasin wrote an article on "The Immortalization of Lenin" and proposed a monument containing Lenin's corpse that would become a center of pilgrimage like Jerusalem or Mecca. Krasin, along with Anatoly Lunacharsky, announced a contest for designs of the permanent monument/mausoleum. Krasin also attempted - unsuccessfully - to preserve Lenin's body cryogenically.

== Personal life ==
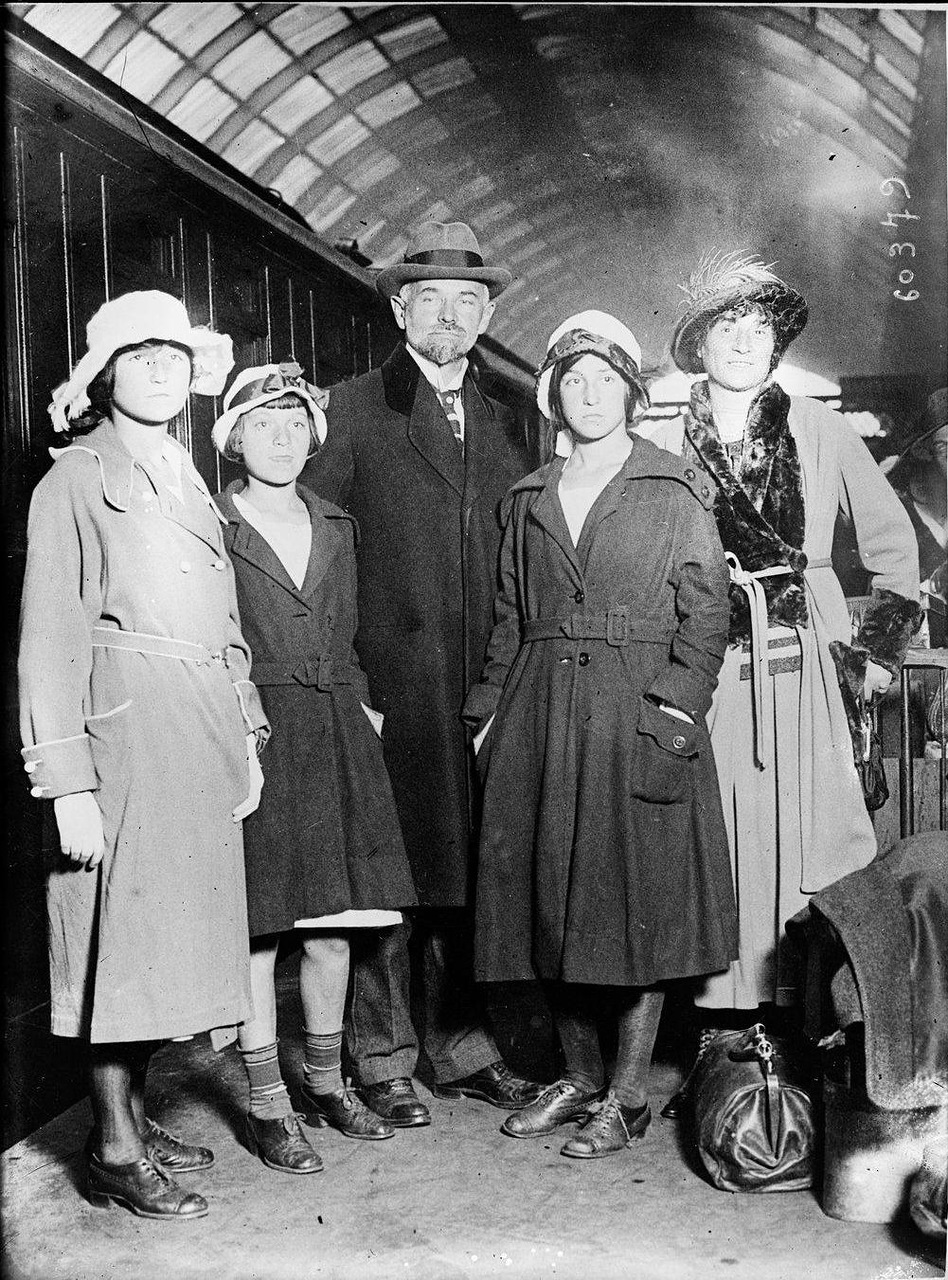
Krasin with his wife and daughters in London

Despite his Siberian upbringing, Krasin was considered one of the most urbane and westernised of the leading Bolsheviks. The Menshevik Simon Liberman, who worked with Krasin in Russia in the 1920s, wrote that:

Krasin was unlike the general run of Lenin's communist aides. Perfect taste always distinguished his attire. His necktie matched his suit and shirt in colour, and even his stickpin was stuck with the special jauntinees of a well-dressed man ... Krasin always emphasised his foreign experience and contacts - his cosmopolitanism. He broadly hinted that he had accepted hardships and privations by returning from Germany to Russia of his own free will.

He and his wife were the parents of three daughters, including:

- Liubov Krasin, who married French politician and diplomat Gaston Bergery, founder of the Frontist Party, from whom she was divorced in 1928. After the Second World War she married French politician and journalist Emmanuel d'Astier de La Vigerie. They were an acquaintance of Svetlana Alliluyeva.
- Ludmilla Krasin, who was reportedly engaged to the Duc de La Rochefoucauld in 1927. She married John Mathiessen Mathias (1906–1963), a son of Robert Moritz Mathias.

While Krasin was negotiating formal recognition of the Bolshevik government by the United Kingdom and France, and despite remedies proposed by his old friend, the physician Alexander Bogdanov, he died from a blood disease. Krasin's funeral procession three days later included 6,000 mourners, many of them Bolshevik sympathizers; he was cremated at Golders Green Crematorium before being buried at the Kremlin Wall Necropolis in Moscow.

== Honors and legacy ==
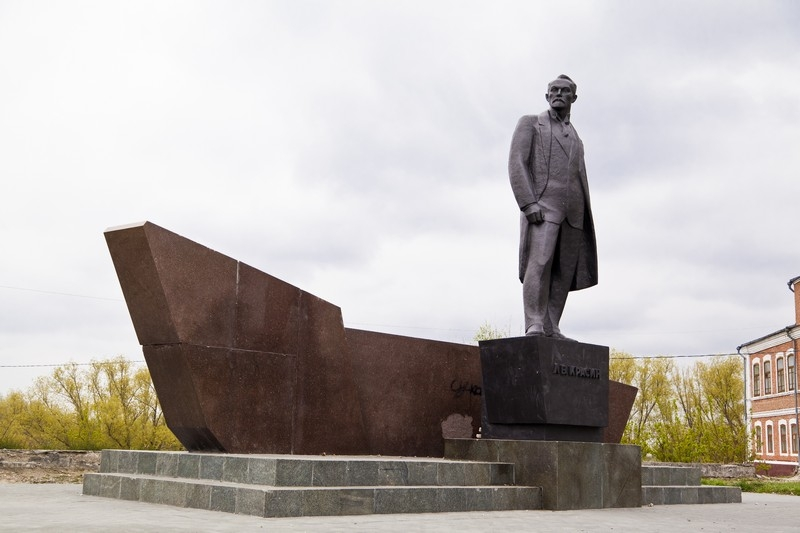
Monument of Leonid Krasin in Kurgan

During the Great Purge and until Stalin's death in 1953, he was largely omitted from the history of the Communist Party and the Soviet government.

Two icebreakers (one launched in 1917 and one in 1976) commemorated Krasin.

== Texts ==
- "Our Trade Policy", Labour Monthly, Vol II, No.1, January 1922
- Archive of Leonid Borisovič Krasin Papers at the International Institute of Social History

== See also ==
- Outline of the Russian Revolution and Civil War
- Bibliography of the Russian Revolution and Civil War
- Bibliography of Stalinism and the Soviet Union
- Index of Old Bolsheviks
- Index of articles related to the Russian Revolution and Civil War
