= Labour left =

Left-wing faction of the Labour Party in the United Kingdom

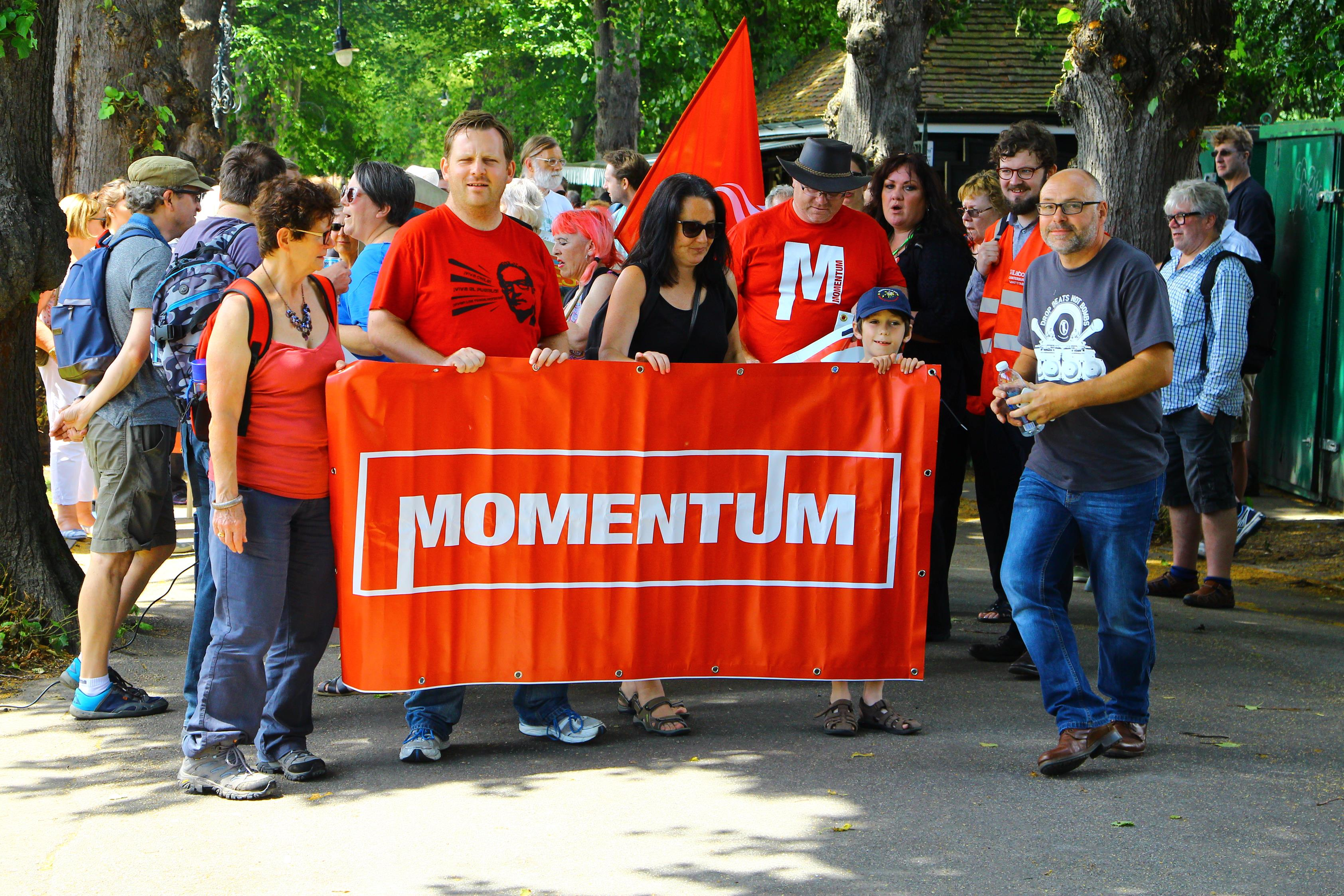
Members of Momentum attending a rally for left-wing Labour Party leader Jeremy Corbyn in 2016

In British politics, the Labour left is the left-wing faction of the Labour Party. (Note: For the purposes of this article, the term Labour left is used. Hard left is another term for the Labour left. Whilst used by several academics, journalists, and commentators, it may be considered pejorative, as the term can be interpreted unfavourably by suggesting that the Labour left is uncompromising on its socialist outlook. An alternative term is outside left. Of the two terms, supporters of the Labour left tend to use outside left; some of its members, such as Labour MP Diane Abbott, have opted to use hard left instead. Other names for the Labour left include Campaign Group left (after the Socialist Campaign Group), firm left, and new Labour left, in contrast to the traditional or old Labour left of Aneurin Bevan and Michael Foot.) Alongside the Labour right, it is one of the two main wings of the Labour Party. It is also one of its four main factions alongside the soft left, the old Labour right, and the New Labour right. In the British parliament, it is represented by the Socialist Campaign Group of Labour members of Parliament (MPs).

A Labour left has existed within the Labour Party since its founding. Historically, the Labour left was one of the two main factions of the party, rivalling the Labour right. In 1980, the Labour left peaked in power as left-wing Labour MP Michael Foot became party leader, marking the first time that Labour had a leader from the Labour left. Following the 1981 Labour deputy leadership election, this traditional Labour left dissolved and split into two new factions, the soft left and the modern Labour left. While the modern Labour left remained on the left wing of the party, the soft left moved towards the party's right-wing, now occupying the space between the Labour left and the Labour right. Foot became a part of the soft left. In 1983, he was succeeded as party leader by soft leftist Neil Kinnock, who took steps to reduce the influence and power of the Labour left within the party.

In 2015, the Labour left saw a resurgence when left-wing Labour MP Jeremy Corbyn was elected as party leader. In 2020, Corbyn resigned and was succeeded by Keir Starmer, who was from the party's right. Under Starmer's leadership of the party, Corbyn was removed from the Parliamentary Labour Party and barred from standing as a Labour parliamentary candidate in the 2024 general election; he was expelled from the party in May of that year, but stood as an independent candidate and won re-election to Islington North.

== History ==
=== Background and early years: 1918–1939 ===
The Labour Party is a political party in the United Kingdom that is typically placed on the centre-left of the political spectrum. It has been characterised as a broad church with a wide range of competing political factions, parliamentary groups, and ideologies. The party has been ideologically divided across its history, leading to the formation of two main rivalling left and right factions within the party. The Labour left is the more left-wing faction of the Labour Party while the Labour right, closer to the political centre, is the more right-wing faction of the Labour Party.

The particular dispute which led to the formation of the two factions was over the meaning of socialism. After the end of the First World War, a revised constitution for the Labour Party was adopted. Clause IV of the new constitution committed the party to the "common ownership of the means of production, distribution and exchange", which was interpreted as a commitment to socialism, even though socialism is not explicitly mentioned. Nonetheless, ideological divisions formed over the meaning of socialism and the purpose of the Labour Party. One group in the party believed that Labour's purpose was to make the British economy more efficient while another group believed that its purpose was to change the relationship between capital and labour. The tension between these two groups made way for the formation of the two factions.

The Labour left emerged as a distinct faction in the Labour Party in the 1920s. By the time the first Labour government came to power under Ramsay MacDonald in 1924, its rivalry with the Labour right had been established, with both factions on an equal footing in the party. Fearing that the Labour leadership was moving away from the party's constitutional commitment to socialism as outlined in Clause IV, the Labour left called for a total overhaul of the British economy, intending to defend the party's socialist principles against the leadership's more pragmatic tendencies. It advocated a transition to a wholly socialist economic system where all industries would be under public ownership and wanted to take power away from people with economic capital. It viewed any alterations to this goal as a form of gradualism, an ideology which it opposed within the Labour Party. The Labour left also wanted a socialist foreign policy characterised by pacifism and internationalism.

There were some members of the Labour left who opposed the formation of MacDonald's 1924 Labour government on the grounds that it would be too moderate because of its parliamentary minority and dependence on the Liberal Party for support. This parliamentary position would have made radical moves near impossible. In the event, the Labour government would take a gradualist approach to socialism; MacDonald rejected calls from the Labour left to govern according to the party's socialist constitution and policy programme, arguing that the party had to prove itself fit to govern. Instead, his government chose to play down or ignore Labour policies such as nationalisation, the capital levy, and public work programmes to alleviate unemployment as a result of its parliamentary position. During the MacDonald government, the Labour leadership's goal was not to end capitalism but to improve its conditions through social reform and wealth redistribution. Thus, Labour was committed to a moderate and competent style of governance, which allowed it to replace the Liberal Party as the main opposition party outside government. Most of the Labour membership supported this gradualist approach; there were socialists within the Independent Labour Party (ILP) who called for militancy instead. The ILP was an affiliated socialist society of the Labour Party that served as its members' section until the adoption of the 1918 Labour constitution, which resulted in the creation of a system of constituency Labour parties (CLPs) with individual Labour membership. Ideologically socialist, it was the main forum for left-wing politics within the Labour Party.

The main achievement of the Labour government was the 1924 Wheatley Housing Act, which MacDonald dubbed "our most important legislative item". John Wheatley, the minister responsible for the Act, was a member of the Labour left. In his role as Minister of Health, he was able to implement this radical Housing Act, which intended to expand council housing and address high rental prices and over-crowding. This measure went some way towards rectifying the problem of the housing shortage, which was caused by the disruption of the building trade during the First World War and the inability of working-class tenants to rent decent, affordable housing. Wheatley was also able to provide public housing to council tenants, as against the previous government's commitment to privatisation. This landmark Act subsidised the construction of 521,700 rented homes at controlled rents by 1933, when the subsidy for encouraging local authority housing construction was abolished.

Although MacDonald's Labour government had dropped Labour's socialist agenda and governed on a largely moderate policy programme, the Liberal Party withdrew its support of the government only nine months after its formation, leading to the Labour government's collapse after a 1924 vote of no confidence against the government of Ramsay MacDonald. In the 1924 general election that followed the government's fall, the Labour Party was defeated by the Conservative Party in a landslide victory. Ultimately, the Labour left and the left-wingers in the ILP considered the 1924 Labour government a failure.

==== Socialism in Our Time and Lansbury's Labour Weekly ====
James Maxton, chairman of the ILP from 1925

In the months that followed the collapse of the MacDonald government collapse, Labour shifted to the left. By the spring of 1925, amid internal discontent with MacDonald's Labour leadership, some members of the Labour Party had started to form left-wing groups in their CLPs, taking inspiration from the Birmingham Left-Wing Labour Group formed in November 1924 by Joseph Southall, a member of the ILP. Also in 1925, Clifford Allen, the moderate chairman of the ILP, was ousted by the Labour left and replaced by the militant James Maxton. Following this change in leadership, the Labour left organised around the ILP.

The ILP's response to the first Labour government was to devise its own programme for government. It authorised six policy commissions in 1925 to "develop a programme for the abolition of poverty within the broader context of an advance towards socialism". These commissions were chaired by J. A. Hobson. By 1926, the ILP had started to develop its own political platform, beginning with a proposal for a new living wage. This proposal evolved into a programme known as Socialism in Our Time, published in 1927, which called for the redistribution of income to reduce unemployment and poverty by creating a demand for housing, the creation of a statutory minimum wage, the nationalisation of banks, transport, utilities and inefficient industries, and the introduction of family allowances and workers' control. These policies were based on Hobson's theories of imperialism and underconsumptionism, which became a doctrine of the Labour left and the ILP during the interwar period.

The Labour leadership was hostile to the ILP's proposals as it was worried that the ILP wanted to implement them in a similar way advocated by Marxists. MacDonald publicly condemned the political beliefs surrounding the proposals, comparing them to "milestones around the parliamentary party's neck". Meanwhile, the ILP insisted on Socialism in Our Time's implementation by the Labour Party, with Maxton stating that this was the only way to preserve the labour movement of the United Kingdom. Differences between the ILP and the Labour leadership began to grow. Labour had been developing a new policy programme since 1927 with a draft of its new manifesto Labour and the Nation scheduled for debate at the 1928 Labour Party Conference, where the ILP and the wider Labour Party clashed. While the Labour leadership remained committed to a gradualist and peaceful transition to socialism through parliamentary politics, and wanted a simple outline of the party's goals, the ILP wanted a short and specific policy programme that would result in the enactment of Socialism in Our Time and full socialism itself. Ultimately, the ILP lost several policy votes at the conference and Labour and the Nation became a simple outline of the party's goals. Subsequently, MacDonald was responsible for the party's platform for the 1929 general election, which made little reference to socialism and no reference to Socialism in Our Time.

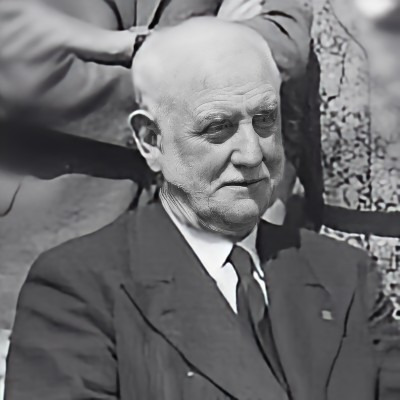
George Lansbury, founder and editor of Lansbury's Labour Weekly

From 1925, the Labour left also organised around Lansbury's Labour Weekly, a newspaper founded in 1925 by its editor George Lansbury, a noted pacifist and socialist from the Labour left. This newspaper acted as a mouthpiece for Lansbury's personal creed of socialism, democracy, and pacifism. In the 1920s, Lansbury was often in alignment with Maxton and his group of Red Clydeside MPs over their criticism of MacDonald's leadership of the Labour Party; he sometimes had a somewhat distant relationship with this group. A party rebel, Lansbury was committed to socialism and clashed with the MacDonald leadership for its moderate and gradualist ideology. He had also been a leading figure in the ILP before 1914. Responding to the gradualist approach adopted by the 1924 Labour government, Lansbury worked with Maxton and John Wheatley to set up an ILP parliamentary caucus within the Parliamentary Labour Party (PLP) to purge it of gradualism. This caucus met regularly, sponsoring joint amendments on the Order Paper and campaigning for support in the Labour Party using the ILP's large individual membership. Although on the left, Lansbury was still a pragmatist. At the 1928 Labour Party conference, Lansbury backed the leadership's plans for Labour and the Nation, calling for party unity in his role as Chairman of the Labour Party. Between 1925 and 1927, Lansbury's Labour Weekly also formed the basis of George Lansbury's Socialist Club, which took a vital role in debates on the left about Labour's future strategy and policy platform.

In 1925, Lansbury's Labour Weekly repeatedly reported on one particular topic, the issues faced by British miners. In turn, Lansbury and his paper would become direct participants in the crisis that was occurring in the coal industry at the time. The crisis, paired with disappointment in the 1924 Labour government and anger towards the policies of the second Baldwin government which followed, led to the outbreak of the 1926 general strike. The Labour leadership did not support the strike, fearing that the revolutionary elements within the union movement would damage Labour's reputation as a party of government and all the work it had done to prove itself fit to govern through gradualist politics. The Labour left responded to this by arguing that a gradualist approach would never achieve its goal, and that gradualism did little to help the workers who needed relief from their suffering and an improved society immediately. Lansbury's Labour Weekly supported the general strike, which in the end was defeated after the Trades Union Congress (TUC) called it off, and Lansbury tried to use the paper to instruct the TUC on preparations for the coming struggle before it occurred; however, when the strike came, the TUC did not want his assistance.

In July 1927, Lansbury's Labour Weekly was merged into the ILP's New Leader newspaper, which the ILP used to promote its political ideology within the Labour movement. By this time, the ILP had become the dominant grouping in several CLPs. It was also the largest socialist society in Labour. The 1929 United Kingdom general election returned 287 Labour MPs and Labour formed another minority government dependent on Liberal Party support. 142 of these Labour MPs were members of the ILP, with 37 of them sponsored by the ILP itself. By 1931, the ILP had a membership of 16,700. This put the ILP into a position that would theoretically allow it to become a strong group for the Labour left within the Labour Party for years to come; however, this would ultimately fail to materialise.

==== Second Labour government and the 1931 political crisis ====
The formation of the second Labour government, again under MacDonald, was opposed by some members of the Labour left for the same reasons they had opposed the first Labour government's formation in 1924; they argued it would be too moderate because of its parliamentary minority and dependence on the Liberal Party for support. The new government decided to take an uncompromising approach towards the Labour left. Lansbury was the only known left-winger to be given a role in the cabinet; the education minister Charles Trevelyan became a left-winger shortly after. Leading figures in the ILP, such as John Wheatley and Fred Jowett, were not included. The new cabinet was generally to the right of the cabinet in the 1924 Labour government, reflecting a rightward shift within MacDonald's Labour Party since that government left office. Lansbury was appointed as the first commissioner of works, an insignificant role with little economic resources available, where it was believed he could not harm the government's moderate reputation.

The political crisis in 1931 proved significant for not just the country but also the wider labour movement and the Labour left. With the fall of MacDonald's second Labour government and MacDonald's formation of the National Government during the crisis, gradualism in the Labour Party fell into uncertainty, with MacDonald expelled from the Labour Party and decried as "a traitor" after years of idolisation. When the National Government won a landslide in the 1931 general election, which returned a rump of 52 Labour MPs, Lansbury became the only leading Labour Party politician to retain his seat. Lansbury became leader of the parliamentary Labour Party (PLP) before succeeding Arthur Henderson as the leader of the party as a whole in 1932. From the beginning of his leadership, Lansbury was challenged by losses and defections from the party caused by the tumultuous relationship between Labour and the ILP. Labour had already suffered the loss of MacDonald's supporters and the supporters of Oswald Mosley, a former Labour MP who had broken away from Labour in 1931 to form the fascist New Party, which attracted figures from the Labour left including Robert Forgan. Nonetheless, the Labour left believed that the year's events were a fair punishment for the Labour Party's mistakes, with Lansbury stating to "honestly believe the movement is going to be purer and stronger for the very heavy defeat we have sustained."

In 1932, the ILP, having already had a negative relationship with the wider party under MacDonald, decided to disaffiliate from the Labour Party. It had increasingly viewed the Great Depression as the beginning of the collapse of capitalism and saw the mainstream Labour Party as insufficiently committed to socialism. It had also openly disregarded party discipline under the second Labour government; a group of ILP Labour MPs known as the Clydesiders during James Maxton's leadership of the ILP criticised the Labour leadership of MacDonald and often disregarded the standing orders of the PLP. These standing orders disallowed Labour MPs from voting against party policy; however, the ILP wanted the ability to instruct its MPs to vote for ILP policy. At the 1931 general election, candidates from the ILP refused to accept the standing orders of the PLP and stood without Labour Party support, becoming known as the unendorsed Labour candidates; five ILP MPs were elected. These MPs were grouped as a separate political party by the speaker of the House of Commons. Lansbury invited Maxton, one of the five ILP MPs, to his opposition frontbench; this attempt at preserving unity between Labour and the ILP proved unsuccessful. Lansbury had been a leading figure in the ILP before 1914 and was typically aligned with Maxton in criticising the Labour leadership of MacDonald during the 1920s. Ultimately, there was little that Lansbury could do to stop the ILP's disaffiliation.

==== Socialist League and the Popular Front ====
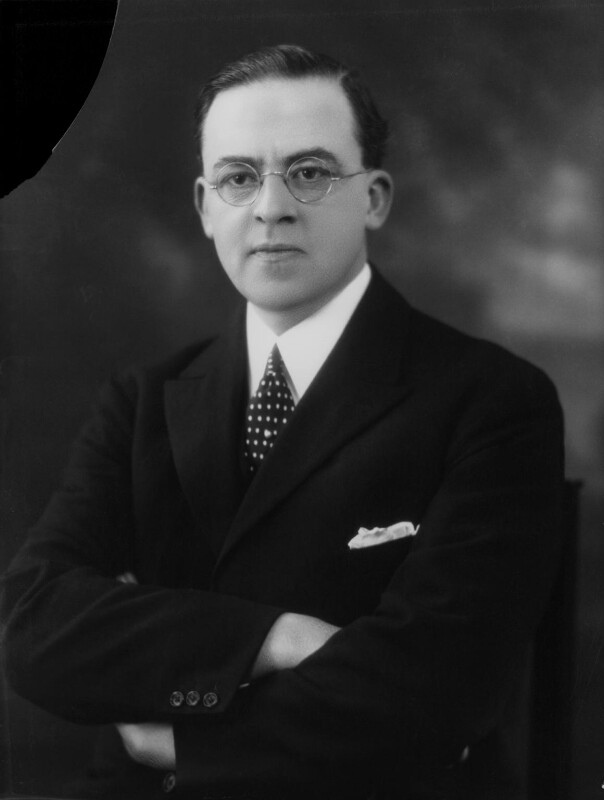
Stafford Cripps, identified as the most dominant member of the Socialist League

Following the disaffiliation of the ILP, the Labour left had to find a new organisation to rally around. In October 1932, the Socialist League was formed mostly to fulfil this role. It was founded by members of the ILP who wanted to remain affiliated to the Labour Party and it was considered to be the ILP's successor in the party. On its founding, they committed itself to mostly undertaking research, complete loyalty to the Labour Party, and avoid the missteps of the ILP. Nonetheless, they would go on to retain the ILP's tendency of becoming disaffected with the Labour Party, and it was proscribed by the Labour leadership within four and a half years of its establishment.

During its short existence, the Socialist League was led by several noted members of the Labour left, including Charles Trevelyan, Frank Wise, Barbara Castle, G. D. H. Cole, William Mellor, and H. N. Brailsford. Other Labour left-wingers who involved themselves with the league included Aneurin Bevan, Harold Laski, and Ellen Wilkinson. On its establishment, the league had six Labour MPs: Clement Attlee, Seymour Cocks, Stafford Cripps, David Kirkwood, Neil Maclean, and Alfred Salter. Within a week of its founding, they saw great success at the 1932 Labour Party Conference, winning votes committing the party to socialist legislation, in particular the nationalisation of the Bank of England and joint stock banks.

=== World War II and the post-war Labour government: 1939–1951 ===
During World War II, the British Labour Party entered a national coalition government under Prime Minister Winston Churchill, with key Labour figures such as Clement Attlee serving in senior roles, including as deputy prime minister. The war years were a crucial period for the British left: they shaped attitudes toward national unity, economic planning, and post-war reconstruction, and they also marked internal debates about socialism, the role of the Communist Party, and the future direction of Labour politics.

Within this wartime context, socialist and left-wing ideas continued to circulate. Some on the Labour left and in affiliated groups opposed the war on ethical grounds, as with sections of the Independent Labour Party which contested elections despite the wartime truce.

After the war, Labour's landslide victory in the 1945 general election brought the party into government with a large majority, giving left-influenced leaders an opportunity to implement a sweeping social reform agenda. Under Clement Attlee as prime minister, the government pursued policies rooted in the party's 1945 manifesto Let Us Face the Future, including extensive nationalization of key industries (such as coal, gas, electricity, railways and, initially, iron and steel), ambitious economic planning, and the creation of a comprehensive welfare state centered on the National Health Service and expanded social insurance.

The post-war period also saw continuing ideological currents on Labour's left: figures such as Aneurin Bevan championed more radical social reforms, while internal debates grew over foreign policy (especially amid emerging Cold War tensions) and the extent of state intervention in the economy.

Labour remained in office until 1951, when it lost to the Conservatives. The achievements of 1945-1951, and the role of left-wing ideas with them, were influential in shaping British social policy and the post-war political consensus, even as internal tensions between different currents of Socialism persisted.

=== Recent developments: 2020–present ===
Following the resignation of Jeremy Corbyn in 2020, Keir Starmer was elected as Labour Party leader. While Labour managed to win a landslide majority in the subsequent 2024 general election, Starmer's position and shift towards a more centrist position has resulted in many MPs in the left faction of the party to grow dissatisfied. With some MPs in talks with Green Party of England and Wales over possible Floor-crossing concerned the decrease in popularity of Labour in their constituencies. Starmer has been accused of marginalising the Labour left by intervening in Labour's parliamentary selection process in favour of more centrist Labour candidates.

Today, the Labour left is usually taken to include former Labour Party leader Jeremy Corbyn and his allies. In Parliament, politicians from the Labour left include Diane Abbott, John McDonnell, Clive Lewis, Richard Burgon, Dan Carden and Nadia Whittome, among others. Outside Parliament, politicians from the Labour left include the former First Minister of Wales, Mark Drakeford; the mayor of the North of Tyne, Jamie Driscoll; and the honorary president of the Socialist Campaign Group and former Labour MP Dennis Skinner.
