= Boris Krasin =

Boris Krasin may refer to:

- Boris Krasin (composer)
- Boris Krasin (policeman)
