= Horrabin =

Horrabin is a surname. Notable people with the surname include:

- J. F. Horrabin (1884–1962), English radical writer and cartoonist
- Winifred Horrabin, née Batho (1887–1971), British socialist activist and journalist
