= Proletariatis Brdzola =

Proletariatis Brdzola (Georgian: პროლეტარიატის ბრძოლა, 'Struggle of the Proletariat') was an illegal Bolshevik newspaper. Proletariatis Brdzola was the organ of the Caucasian League of the Russian Social Democratic Labour Party. It was founded in connection with the 1st congress of Caucasian League. The paper was the result of the fusion of two illegal publications, the Georgian Brdzola and the Armenian Proletariat.

Initially, the paper was printed at the clandestine printing shop 'Nina' in Baku. In September 1904 the printing was shifted to Tbilisi. Proletariatis Brdzola was published in Georgian, Armenian and Russian. The Georgian edition had a circulation of 1200-2500 copies, the Armenian edition 1000–1200 copies and the Russian edition around 1200–1500 copies.

Its editorial board included V. S. Bobrovsky, M. N. Davitashvili, Filipp Makharadze, Joseph Stalin, Alexander Tsulukidze, M. G. Tskhakaya and Stepan Shahumyan. The editorial board of Proletariatis Brdzola had contacts with the exiled Bolshevik leadership. It repeatedly published articles by Lenin and other material from publications such as Iskra, Vperod and Proletary. Proletariatis Brdzola was published between April–May 1903 and October 1905. In total twelve issues were published.
