= Nina Printing House =

Secret underground printing house

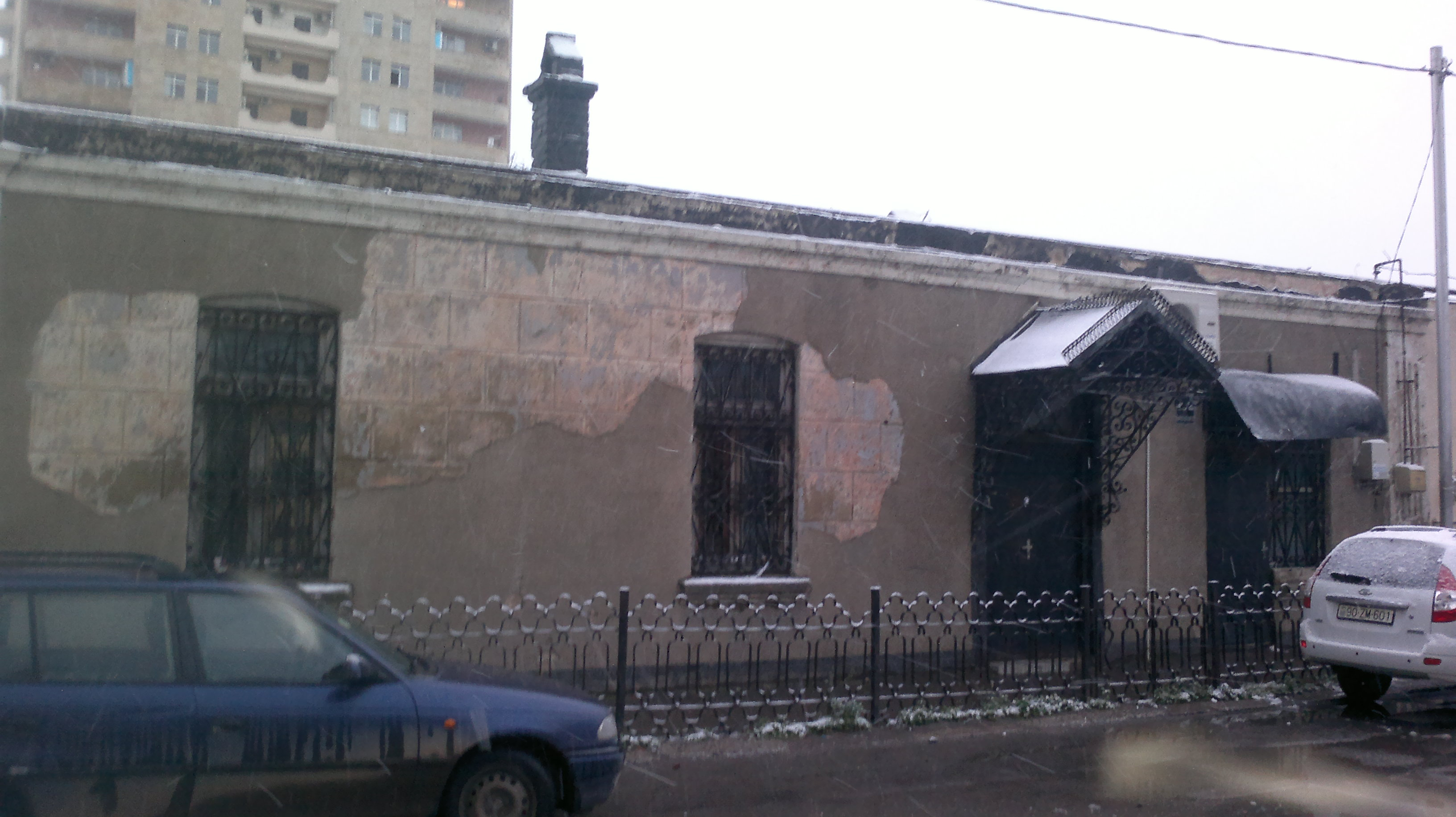
Building of former Nina Printing House nowadays

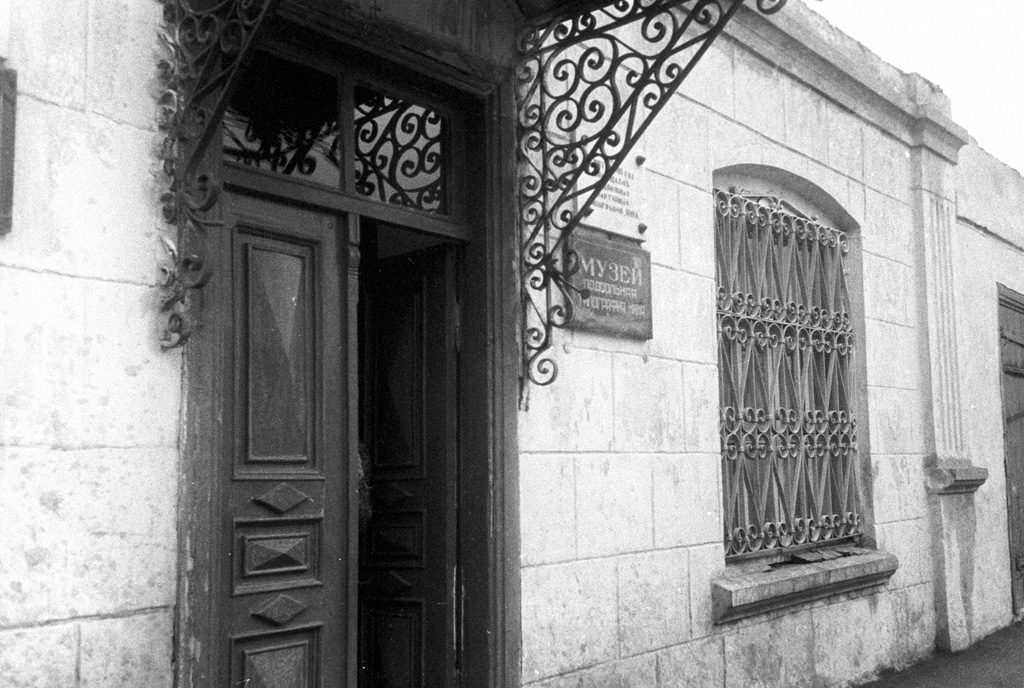
House-museum of underground printing-office Nina where newspaper Iskra (Spark) was published in 1901-1905.

Nina was a Samizdat secret underground printing house in Baku, Russian Empire, established in July 1901 by the Baku Iskraist group, consisting of Lado Ketskhoveli, Leonid Krasin, Nikolay P. Kozerenko, Avel Yenukidze, Semyon Yenukidze, and Lev Halperin. Nina received direct assistance from Lenin and had contacts with the Tbilisi committee of the Russian Social Democratic Labour Party.

At Nina, the illegal Georgian language newspaper Brdzola was printed, as well as an array of leaflets and pamphlets in Russian, Armenian and Georgian languages. Nina was temporarily shut down from April 1902 to December 1902. In 1903 it was occupied with printing the conference documents of the 2nd Congress of the Russian Social Democratic Labour Party, documents of the Caucasian League of RSDLP as well as works by Karl Marx, Friedrich Engels and Lenin.

After the 1903 RSDLP congress in Brussels and London, it came to function as the printing house of the Central Committee of the RSDLP. In total around 1.5 million copies of different publications were brought out by Nina. At the 3rd Congress of the Russian Social Democratic Labour Party, the legacy of Nina was praised. In January 1906 the central committee of the party decided to shut Nina down and moved its printing house to Saint Petersburg.
