= Winifred Horrabin =

British socialist activist and journalist (1887–1971)

- Born: 9 September 1887; Sheffield, England, United Kingdom of Great Britain and Ireland
- Died: 24 June 1971 (aged 83); Dorking, England, United Kingdom
- Education: Sheffield School of Art
- Occupation: Writer
- Spouse: Frank Horrabin (m. 1911; divorced in 1947)

Winifred Horrabin, née Batho (9 September 1887 – 24 June 1971), was a British socialist activist and journalist.

== Early life and education ==
She was born in Sheffield, West Riding of Yorkshire, on 9 August 1887, daughter of Arthur John Batho, a postal telegraph clerk, and his wife Lilian, née Outram. She was the fourth of six children, three of whom died in infancy. The family were members of The Wicker Congregational Church. Her father died in May 1891, in Graaff-Reinet, South Africa, where he was seeking treatment for his tuberculosis.

Winifred began attending the Sheffield School of Art in 1907, where she met her future husband, the political activist, cartographer and cartoonist Frank Horrabin. She had a political awakening while a student, influenced by the South African socialist and feminist Olive Schreiner. She joined the Women's Social and Political Union, a militant group campaigning for women's suffrage led by Emmeline Pankhurst, and in 1909 disrupted a speech by Winston Churchill with the suffragette cry "Votes for women!"

== Career ==
=== 1910s ===
She and Horrabin married on 11 August 1911, and they moved to London the same year. In 1912 she delivered a paper, "Is Woman's Place the Home?", to the Fabian Society, arguing that the liberation of women from economic slavery depended on the destruction of private property. She and her husband were involved in the Central Labour College, and in 1913 Winifred set up a Women's League to focus on the education of female workers. In 1915, inspired by the art of William Morris, she became a guild socialist. She was honorary secretary of The Plebs' League, and contributed to The Plebs, the League's journal, which her husband edited.

=== 1920s ===
She became a founder member of the Communist Party of Great Britain in 1920. She and her husband collaborated on a book, Working Class Education, published in 1924.

In 1926 she travelled to the Soviet Union, where she met N. K. Krupskaya and visited Lenin's tomb. Her trip appears to have been organised by the Soviet Society for Cultural Relations with Foreign Countries. She also visited Poland and witnessed a mass trial of political dissidents.

=== 1930s and 1940s ===
In 1932 her brother Harold died from wounds sustained in the First World War, and she made an anti-war speech to the National Conference of Labour Women, arguing that the working classes should reject employment in munitions factories, even if it meant starvation. The Horrabins were involved in setting up the Socialist League, a left-wing faction within the Labour Party led by Stafford Cripps, in 1932, and it was Winifred who named it, after the original Socialist League, founded by William Morris. It took anti-war, anti-fascist and pro-nationalisation positions, but only lasted until 1937, when the Labour Party declared that membership was incompatible with membership of the Party. She began reviewing books and films for Tribune in 1937, continuing to do so until 1948. She also wrote for the political magazine Time and Tide and had a weekly column in the Manchester Evening News from 1944 under the pseudonym Freda Wynne.

In 1938 her mother died, and she was diagnosed with an ovarian cyst, undergoing a hysterectomy the following year.

== Later life ==
Her husband, who had been having a long-term affair with his secretary, Margaret McWilliams, asked for a separation in 1942 and they divorced in 1947. In her later years she compiled a collection of autobiographical essays, The Summer of a Dormouse, and wrote a novel, After Which War?, but did not publish them. Other unpublished works included a play, Victorian Love Story: Beloved Good, about Thomas Carlyle and his wife Jane, and a biography of Olive Schreiner. She died at her home in Dorking, Surrey, on 24 June 1971, and was cremated at Randall's Park crematorium, Leatherhead, on 30 June. Her papers are held by the University of Hull.

== See also ==
- List of suffragists and suffragettes
