= Abraham Lyons =

English Conservative MP (1894–1961)

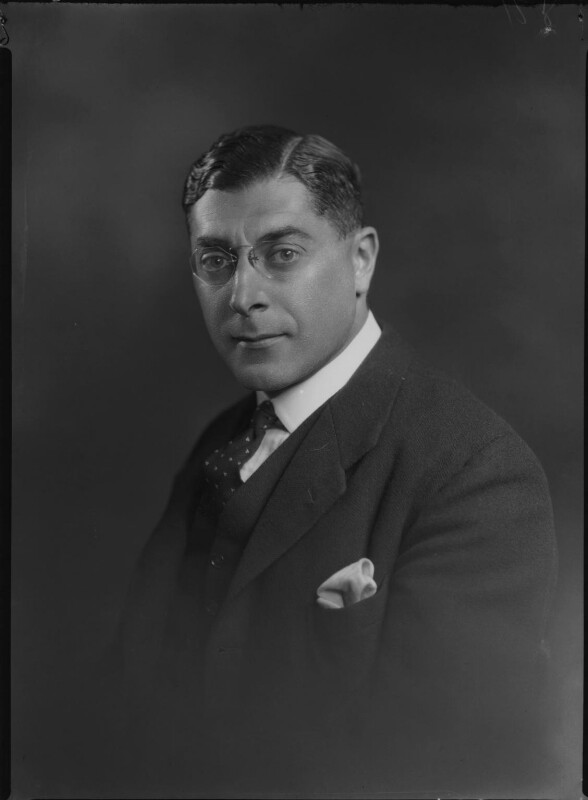
- Lyons in 1932

Member of Parliament for Leicester East
- In office 27 October 1931 – 15 June 1945
- Preceded by: Frank Wise
- Succeeded by: Terence Donovan

Personal details
- Born: 10 February 1894
- Died: 29 November 1961 (aged 67)
- Party: Conservative

Abraham Montagu Lyons (10 February 1894 – 29 November 1961) was an English lawyer, judge, politician and author, who served as a Conservative member of the Parliament of the United Kingdom for Leicester East, and as Recorder of Great Grimsby.

== Background ==
Lyons was the only son of Rabinovitch Lyons of West Bridgford, Nottinghamshire.

He attended Clee Grammar School for Boys in Lincolnshire.

He was commissioned a Second Lieutenant in the British Army on 23 October 1914, following the outbreak of World War I.

== Legal career ==
Lyons was called to the Middle Temple on 28 June 1922, at which time he was a solicitor living in West Bridgford; became "leader" of the Midland circuit, and "took silk" in 1933. In 1936 he was appointed Recorder of Great Grimsby He was said to have been one of the few Jewish judges in 1930s England to take an active role in the Jewish community.

== Service in Parliament ==
Lyons was elected in the 1931 general election, unseating Labour incumbent Frank Wise. He was re-elected in the 1935 election, but was defeated in the 1945 election by Labour candidate Terence Donovan.

== Writings ==
He was the author of The Law and Procedure Relating to Bastardy Orders (London: Stevens and Sons, 1923) and (with S.W. Magnus) of Advertisement Control (Leigh-on-Sea: Thames Bank, 1949), a commentary on the Town and Country Planning Act, 1947, and on the Town and Country Planning (Control of Advertisements) Regulations, 1948.

== World War II service ==
On 5 July 1938, he was granted a commission as Squadron Leader and appointed to the command of the No. 910 (County of Essex) Balloon Squadron of the Auxiliary Air Force. He is referred to in Hansard as "Major Lyons" but in his last appearance in that record (12 April 1945) is referred to as "Colonel Lyons"; the latter may have been a brevet commission.

== Later years ==
From 1959 to 1960 he served as Master of the Livery for the Worshipful Company of Pattenmakers.

Parliament of the United Kingdom
Preceded by Frank Wise	Member of Parliament for Leicester East; 1931 – 1945	Succeeded by Terence Donovan
