= Japhet and Happy =

Japhet and Happy was a British newspaper cartoon strip originally appeared as 'The Adventures of the Noah Family' initially in The Daily News during 1919 and transferred in 1930 to the News Chronicle. It was originated and drawn by J. F. Horrabin, James Francis Horrabin (1884–1962) who was a British journalist, cartoonist and cartographer, and he was elected Labour Member of Parliament for Peterborough from 1929 to 1931. He wrote Political books as well as the 'Dot and Carrie' strip for The Star that ran from 1922 to 1964.

== Characters ==
The main Noah Family characters initially were Japhet, a boy, his brothers Shem & Ham, their parents Mr & Mrs Noah. Selina and Matilda were their cousins who lived with them together with Fido the dog. They all lived in a house on Ararat Avenue in South West London, as mentioned on the 1924 book.

The human Noah Family characters were styled like wooden puppets with human faces but without elbow or knee joints or fingers. The styling changed in the early years from very skinny and stick-like bodies to the more familiar rounded figures as seen by 1924. An early-introduced character was an elderly gentleman, Mr Cheery, who helped Japhet when he was lost in an early story. His adopted son, Tim Tosset featured in the earlier strips but had left by the time Happy was introduced in c1926-27. Happy was a small fat bear that never spoke, unlike other cartoon animals. Later additions included Oswald the tortoise who had a liking for hiding. Jerry was their odd-job handyman who was an ex-sailor & dressed similarly. Adelaide was an ostrich, Archibald (Archie) was a donkey and Gerald was a goat. Their garden later had a Golobosh Tree brought from a trip visiting the Panjandrum. By the time of a 1950s annual, Cracky the dog & Pukky, a parrot-type bird, were added. Despite the Noah characters names, there was no actual religious theme to the series.

The cartoon strips included a whimsical take on everyday life and misunderstandings through the eyes of Japhet including scenes at school and appearing in a Circus. In later annuals from the mid-1930s visits were made to an imaginary African country 'Andamalumbo' where they met His Highness the Grand Panjandrum of Andamalumbo, Lord of the Golden Umbrella, Eater of the Purple Goloboshes, and wearer of the Top Hat (as quoted from the 1933 Annual). The Panjandrum could speak no English, but an invented phrase he used as "Welcome" was Wamblety Oola. In later stories The Panjandrum and his friend Bom would visit the Noah's in England. Also see Panjandrum for a later use of this Samuel Foote invented word, probably influenced by its popularised pre-War usage in the Japhet and Happy strips.

== The Arkubs ==
As with other annuals, such as Teddy Tail with the Teddy Tail League, Pip, Squeak and Wilfred with the WLOG and Bobby Bear with the Bobby Bear Club, Japhet and Happy also had a club in the mid-1930s, The Arkubs. The club had a badge, with Happy and AK on it. There were secret codes, hand signs and rules for The Grand United Order of Arkubs. To join the Arkubs, if you were under 15, you had to collect 12 'Happy' Badges from the News Chronicle and send off three pence. You could also get a Japhet and Happy breakfast set of a cup, saucer, plate and egg cup by enrolling 6 new members.

== Annuals ==
The first book published containing their stories was the 1920 Cassell & Co small format hardback Some Adventures of the Noah Family including Japhet. A large format paperback book The Japhet Book from 1924 (date found from an advert at the back) features 120 cartoon strip reprints. Later Hardback annuals followed with non-annual type titles in 1926 About Japhet & The Rest Of The Noah Family; 1927 Japhet & Co. Including Happy; 1928 Japhet & The Arkubs; 1929 Japhet & The Arkubs At Sea; 1930 Japhet & Co. On Arkub Island. 1931 had the Japhet & Happy Book. The yearly dated Japhet and Happy Annual appeared from 1932 to 1939 (though dated for the following year as typical with Annuals). They featured newspaper reprints and added stories. During the war they changed in format. The 1940 annual was undated, but portrait style, like those that preceded it. In 1941 the annual switched to landscape. From 1942 they slimmed considerably, perhaps due to paper shortages. In style they became reprinted cartoon strips with songsheets at the end, having dropped the longer stories. After the war from 1946 to circa 1951 they continued as undated annuals, mostly in the smaller landscape style, but with two in a larger format in similar size to the 1924 one. For book collectors, the hardback annuals 1926 to 1934 were of a smaller size than the later hardback ones. The slim landscape format hardback books are from 1941 onwards. Also issued were at least 3 'Holiday Annuals', 'The Noahs on Holiday with Japhet', 'The Japhet Holiday Book' and 'The Japhet and Happy Holiday Book'.

== Book publications ==
- Some Adventures Of The Noah Family - Including Japhet, 1920, Cassell & Co. Ltd.
- The Noahs on Holiday - with Japhet, c1921, Cassell & Co. Ltd.
- More About The Noahs & Tim Tosset, 1922, Cassell & Co. Ltd.
- Mr Noah, 1922, The Daily News Ltd. This is a 'Mr Noah' shaped small 24 page paperback book
- The Japhet Book: 120 Pictures about the Noahs of Ararat Avenue SW, 1924 (cover price 1/-), The Daily News Ltd
- About Japhet & The Rest Of The Noah Family, 1926, Fleetgate Publications
- Japhet & Co. Including Happy, 1927, Fleetgate Publications
- Japhet & The Arkubs, 1928, Daily News Publications
- Japhet & The Arkubs At Sea, 1929, Daily News Publications
- Japhet & Co. On Arkub Island, 1930, Daily News Publications
- Japhet & Happy Book 1931 News Chronicle Publications
- Japhet & Happy Annual 1933–1940, News Chronicle Publications (issued the year before cover date, i.e. 1933 was issued 1932, so this list is complete)
- Japhet & Happy Annual (undated) c1941-1951 News Chronicle Publications
- The Japhet Holiday Book, 1937 (cover price 6d), News Chronicle Publications
- The Japhet and Happy Holiday Book, c.1938 News Chronicle Publications
