= Frank Wise (British politician) =

British economist, civil servant and Labour politician

Edward Frank Wise CB (3 July 1885 – 5 November 1933) was a British economist, civil servant and Labour Party politician. He served as a Member of Parliament (MP) from 1929 to 1931.

As a civil servant at the National Insurance Commission, War Office and Ministry of Food and Board of Trade he was instrumental in introducing state control for the requisitioning of raw materials at the War Office and of prices and the meat trade at the Ministry of Food. Following the Paris Peace Conference, 1919, he was a Delegate to the Supreme Economic Council and led the negotiations for the Anglo-Soviet Trade Agreement 1920–21. He was an adviser to David Lloyd George at the Genoa Conference (1922). He controversially resigned from the UK Civil Service to become the Director of the Soviet Union's Trade Office Centrosoyuz in 1923.

Wise was elected as an Independent Labour Party Member of Parliament for Leicester East at the May 1929 general election, but lost his seat at the subsequent general election in October 1931. He was a prominent member of the ILP but resigned when it disaffiliated from the Labour Party in 1932, becoming the first chairman of the Socialist League. From 1929 he had an intimate relationship with Jennie Lee, which ended in 1933 with his sudden death at Wallington Hall, the home of Sir Charles Trevelyan.

== Early life ==
Frank Wise was born on 3 July 1885 at 13 Albert Street, Bury St. Edmunds, the county town of West Suffolk. He was the elder of the two sons of Edward Wise, a game dealer and fishmonger, and Ellen Clayton Wise (née Joel). The Wise family had been East London fishmongers for at least three generations and the Joel family were originally from North Wales and active in the linen trade in London. Edward Wise, his father, died on 29 February 1888 and the two boys were brought up by their mother Ellen Wise, who established a ladies outfitter and baby linen business in Bury St. Edmunds from the early 1890s onwards.

Wise attended Guildhall Feoffment School and King Edward VI School, Bury St Edmunds, winning an Exhibition Scholarship to Sidney Sussex College, Cambridge, to read Mathematics. He was a member of the Football and Athletics teams (half Blue). He was Second Senior Optime in the Mathematical Tripos in 1906, graduating with a B.A. Degree in 1906. He then took a second class in Part I in the Natural Sciences Tripos in 1907.

== Civil servant ==
Wise passed his civil service examinations and became a junior clerk in the House of Commons in 1907. He was called to the Bar at Middle Temple in 1911. At this time he was also a Sub Warden of Toynbee Hall, the University Settlement in Whitechapel. He and Clement Attlee were in the cast of Ali Baba and the Forty Borough Councillors, the Toynbee Hall Christmas pantomime in December 1909. Wise played Ali Baba and Attlee took the role of Guava Djelli. Wise was Sub-Warden between 1911 and 1912 and was noted as a vigorous advocate of new social legislation. Wise was one of the Toynbee men who were in key positions in Government Administration during the First World War. His association with Toynbee Hall continued after the war.

He transferred to the Government Insurance Department which introduced the National Insurance Act 1911 and became acting Principal Clerk to the National Health Insurance Commission in 1912. He was involved in developing the machinery for implementing the Act and was particularly concerned with devising a scheme for the decasualisation of dock labour.

He became secretary to the Anglo-Russian Supplies Committee in the War Office (1914–15), responsible for purchasing munitions for Russia. He was promoted to be assistant director of Army Contracts in charge of clothing and raw materials in late 1915. In this position he created a Raw Materials Section, consciously imitating the work of Walther Rathenau in the German War Office, introducing state trading and control of Russian flax. He had responsibility for army clothing contracts and also took on the chairmanship of the Central Committee for the Boot and Leather Trades which ensured that the sufficient leather for Army boots was available at prices that could be afforded.

He moved to the Ministry of Food, following the appointment of U.F. Wintour as permanent secretary, in 1917, becoming head of the Meat, Milk, Fats Division introducing control of the meat trade. He was described as an ‘aggressive and impatient spirit', convinced of the ‘danger and impossibility of half-measures' and harshly contemptuous of ‘self-interest, timidity and caution'. He was ‘constantly taking risks, doing unprecedented things, defying the precedents, incurring the disapproval of his colleagues, butting in and suggesting improvements, short-circuiting the established routine and stretching the authority given to him to its extreme limit... he was a thruster; a man of action; an adventurer who took a creative artist's delight in a successful piece of organisation.'

He was appointed Companion of the Order of the Bath (CB) in the 1919 New Year Honours for services during the war.

=== Provisioning Germany and Supreme Economic Council ===
Wise was seconded by the Ministry of Food to advise on food supplies to Germany in February 1919 becoming the Food Controller's delegate on the Supreme Economic Council in March 1919 as part of the team, involved with supplying food to Germany and other countries leading up to the Paris Peace Conference 1919. He made an ‘on the ground' inspection and his report on the need to provide food supplies was accepted by the UK Cabinet and the Supreme Economic Council. He remained in Paris during this period and in September was appointed as a UK representative on the Supreme Economic Council when it moved to London that autumn.

=== Anglo-Soviet Trade Agreement ===
He accompanied Lloyd George to Paris as a member of the British delegation which intended to finalise the Peace Treaty. Wise's scheme for opening negotiations with the Soviet Union was circulated to the UK Cabinet on 13 January 1920. It argued that the continuance of the Russian Civil War and the blockade meant that food supplies were not reaching Europe and as a result high prices were being paid for American supplies. Central Europe in particular needed food and only Russia could provide sufficient grain and this would transform the situation. The Cabinet minute confirmed that discussions would begin with the Soviet Representatives on opening trade and negotiations developed over the following months. Wise took a key role as the Chairman of the Interdepartmental Russia Committee, acting as the British Representative on the Supreme Economic Council, which was tasked with the detailed arrangements for concluding the trade negotiations.

The Anglo-Soviet Trade Agreement was signed on 16 March 1921. The legal significance of de facto recognition meant that Soviet goods were now protected from claimants with debts incurred through confiscation or nationalisation and the Soviet Mission in London became a permanent, rather than a transient presence.

=== Genoa Conference (1922) ===
Wise was involved in detailed negotiations about the Russian position and the conditions laid down for their participation in the Genoa Conference 1922. His role as an adviser to Lloyd George provoked resentment in the Foreign Office, which considered him to have "decidedly left wing views" being an "arch-bolshevist" with little "experience of international politics." He was not allowed by the Foreign Office to sit on conference proceedings.

His involvement in the negotiations at the Genoa Conference that culminated in the Rapallo Treaty between the Soviet Union and Germany, was the subject of much speculation and dispute. The treaty cast a shadow of the remainder of the Conference. It is suggested that it had major consequences since Germany deliberately broke the West's solidarity towards Soviet Russia to gain its own advantage. It was decided to postpone all the difficult issues to a further conference at The Hague in June. He attended this but Lloyd George did not and although it was intended to negotiate with the Russians on debts, property, and credits, it failed to reach agreement and the Russians admitted they had nothing new to offer.

== Civil service resignation – appointment to Centrosoyuz ==
Since 1921 he had been an Assistant Secretary Board of Trade in the Civil Service. He was also prominent in the Society of Civil Servants. This Society had arranged a series of lectures in 1920 and 1921. Wise was chairman of its lecture committee and spoke on ‘The Civil Service in relation to industry and commerce.' It is claimed that it was Wise's inspiration that was largely responsible for the founding of the Institute of Public Administration since the sub-committee which organised the lectures was also responsible for drawing up proposals for the institute. Wise became the interim Chairman of the institute (subsequently the Royal Institute of Public Administration) until he resigned from the Civil Service in March 1923.

He resigned as Assistant Secretary, Board of Trade on 1 March 1923. His press statement stated that his resignation was in order for him to accept an invitation to act as an Economic Adviser in respect of foreign trade to the Central Union of Russian Co-operative Societies, Centrosoyuz and as a Director of the London Office of the Russian Co-operative Organisations. Questions were asked in the House of Commons on 6 March 1923. Reaction from the Morning Post was extremely critical although other papers were more complimentary.

The organisation brought together all the co-operatives in Russia which had been formed from the consumer cooperative societies which had been introduced from England and Germany in the late 19th century. Its own bulletin, published to coincide with Wise's appointment in March 1923 stated that it was entirely non political and responsible for its own business. However, it is generally accepted that this was incorrect and that the co-operatives had been under Soviet Government control since at least the start of the trade negotiations in early 1920.

Wise worked for Centrosoyuz as a director and economic adviser developing trade between the UK and Russia until his death in 1933. He visited Russia frequently and represented the Soviet Union's interests in trade, commerce and banking throughout the period. He had excellent contacts both within the UK Government and with the Soviet Government and was used as an intermediary by both.

The Zinoviev letter and the ARCOS affair had a severe impact on Anglo-Soviet relations, leading to a break in diplomatic relations, but Wise's views which he consistently reiterated were that trade between the two countries was essential, as was full diplomatic recognition. He was persistent in seeking to persuade both Arthur Henderson Foreign Secretary and Hugh Dalton Under-Secretary at the Foreign Office in the Labour Government 1929 -31 of the need to restore relations at ambassadorial level.

== Independent Labour Party ==
There are various dates in the literature for when Wise joined the Independent Labour Party. Oldfield suggests that he was a pre-war member and the biography of Jennie Lee gives 1921 but The Times records in its issue for Wednesday 28 November 1923 that following his resignation from the Civil Service to develop Anglo-Russian trade, he placed his services at the disposal of the Independent Labour Party.

In the 1924 General Election, Wise was the Independent Labour Party candidate in the Bradford North constituency. He lost to the Unionist, Eugene Ramsden by 2,017 votes in what had been a Liberal seat in 1923 but had previously been Unionist in 1922.

== The Living Wage ==
Wise's involvement with the ILP was significant. His initial contribution was to its policy on agriculture in the early 1920s, influenced by his experience in the Ministry of Food. This led eventually to the setting up of a number of commissions by 1925, the most significant of which was to forge a plan for the ‘abolition of poverty and the realisation of socialism' based on John A. Hobson's theory of 'under consumption'. The Living Wage Commission under its secretary H. N. Brailsford, produced its interim report Socialism in Our Time for the 1926 ILP Party Conference. Despite criticisms during the debate about the possibility of arriving at a figure for a living wage that everyone could agree to, let alone one that could be enforced, Wise was adamant that in the past every trade union had tried to fix and enforce a minimum wage, restricted by having to look at the circumstances of its own industry at the moment. However, he saw no outstanding difficulties in doing over a wide area what had been done in a multitude of cases.

The final report, called The Living Wage, was produced in September 1926. It is suggested that Wise had been the main author of Socialism in Our Time. Beatrice Webb called The Living Wage a monument of conceit and ignorance, suggesting that Brailsford was probably the author with Wise's help. Others disagreed, claiming that the document was far in advance of its time, becoming the basis of all future social reform legislation. The novelty of the final report was its identification of the low demand for goods as among the potent causes of the widespread unemployment since low wages diminished domestic purchasing power. More than any other document produced by the ILP, it was a comprehensive statement of domestic policy in which, though the overt emphasis was on a living wage, the central argument was for the adoption of full-scale planning. It is claimed that in many ways this programme anticipated Keynesian economics and, indeed, helped to pave the way for the great reception of Keynes in the 1940s.

== Second Labour Government ==
The General Election in May 1929 saw the return of a Labour Government under Ramsay MacDonald. Wise was the Independent Labour Party candidate for Leicester East, winning the seat with a majority of 8,732 over the Unionist.

His maiden speech was on the dumping of German wheat on 30 October 1929. The speech was described as a ‘brilliant debut' and ‘an impressive maiden speech,' although others were less complimentary and he was attacked for his involvement with the Russian Government and his appointment as the Economic Adviser to Centrosoyuz.

He supported the Soviet Government through speeches in the House of Commons, in contributions to conferences and journals and lobbying for diplomatic recognition.

Wise became a member of the dissident ILP Group along with James Maxton, Fenner Brockway and Jennie Lee and others who agreed to the conditions of the ILP National Administrative Council which required that members of the parliamentary group accept the policies of the ILP Conference and those contained in ‘Socialism in Our Time.' This inevitably provoked a clash with the remainder of the Parliamentary Labour Party and they opposed the Government's policy, especially its unemployment policy on fundamental economic grounds.

In December 1929 there were a series of amendments proposed for the Unemployment Insurance Bill, which caused considerable dissension within the Labour Party and within the ILP Group in Parliament. Wise was one of the main contributors and their principal spokesman on the issue.

At the ILP Annual Conference in April 1930 there was a major debate about unemployment. Wise complained that some of the socialists in the House desired to be more capitalistic than the capitalists and that the policy of the Government had been in many respects less socialistic than persons in charge of industry would have desired. The Second Parliamentary Session from October 1930 – October 1931 was dominated by the unemployment issue and the deterioration of relationships between the ILP and the Labour Party Executive. The budget on 27 April 1931 caused great unease because if there was insufficient yield from taxation then the reduction of expenditure would be the only alternative to increased taxation. During the debate in the House of Commons, the budget was called a complete gamble by the Conservatives' Oliver Stanley and attacked by Wise as insufficiently socialist. Matters came to a head with the publication at the end of July 1931 of the May Report on National Expenditure It proposed major reductions in government spending and balancing the budget. Wise wrote in the New Leader of 7 August that it was almost unthinkable that the Government could identify itself with a report which reversed the principles of the Labour Movement.

The Cabinet resigned and King George V agreed to the formation of a National Government, led by Ramsay MacDonald on 24 August 1931. Wise bitterly attacked the Government as it became clear that a general election would follow. He argued for an international approach to the world financial crisis and concluded that never again could this country permit its economic life, its financial stability and the livelihood of its workers to be at the mercy of bankers in the City of London. They were guided, not by any general considerations of national policy or interest, which were entirely outside their province, but only by their immediate personal interests.

== Independent Labour Party disaffiliation from the Labour Party ==
At the subsequent election, Wise lost his seat to the Conservative Abraham Montagu Lyons.

The quarrel between the ILP and the Labour Party continued after the election. James Maxton sought to ensure that the ILP had freedom to advocate its own policies but the Labour Party refused to allow a party within a party. Wise was determined to keep the ILP inside the Labour Party and challenged Maxton on the issue. Maxton's response is quoted by Gordon Brown – "Frank Wise asks me if I have another instrument than the Labour Party for the achievement of Socialism and if I have counted the cost. The answer is 'yes'. I ask him if he has counted the cost of remaining inside and working another 38 years for a repetition of the fiasco of 1931."

There was failure to break the deadlock between the Labour Party and the ILP and a Special ILP Conference was held at Bradford in July and disaffiliation was recommended. This was agreed and ILP members were ordered to withdraw from local Labour Parties and other groups such as local authorities. Wise resigned from the ILP National Administrative Council and the split in the ILP's ranks became final.

The breakdown in relationships between the ILP and the Labour Party in July 1932 left a political vacuum on the left. As a result, those, including Wise, who wanted to remain attached to the Labour Party determined to form a new faction within the Labour Party and established the ILP Affiliation Committee in 1932. The Society for Socialist Inquiry and Propaganda (SSIP) had been founded while the Labour Government was still in office in an endeavour to secure the adoption of a well-considered socialist programme. The first chairman was Ernest Bevin. It had been formed in close association with the New Fabian Research Bureau whose chairman was Clement Attlee. Neither of these groups sought to take any direct part in parliamentary politics or seek formal affiliation to the Labour Party. Negotiations between the SSIP and the Affiliation Committee led to amalgamation and the formation of the Socialist League which was founded prior to the Labour Party Conference in October 1932. The members would not accept Ernest Bevin as chairman of any combined body and insisted on Wise as its first chairman. Bevin's biographer states that this confirmed all his old prejudices about intellectuals.

The National Executive Committee (NEC) of the Labour Party approved the League's request for affiliation to the Party in November 1932.

== Nationalising the banks ==
At the Labour Party Conference at Leicester in October 1932, Wise (as a delegate for the Mid-Bucks Party) moved the amendment to a resolution from the Labour Party's National Executive on the subject of currency, banking and finance. This resolution had made no mention of the joint stock banks other than the Bank of England and he said they should be brought under public ownership and control. It was opposed by Ernest Bevin on what he called "practical grounds". The resolution was defeated and the amendment passed by a narrow majority. As a result of this vote, the Party Conference committed Labour to the immediate introduction of socialist legislation on gaining office and specifically to the nationalisation of the joint stock banks in addition to the Bank of England. The Times commented that this had hung chains on its leaders and fettered its parliamentary candidates with a crippling burden of Socialist obligations.

Following the Conference, the Labour Party's Finance and Trade Committee invited Wise and Clement Attlee to prepare memoranda on the joint stock banks and at the same time Hugh Dalton initiated a series of research projects.

Wise's work was published in a Socialist League pamphlet entitled The Control of Finance and the Financiers and his ideas were set out in more detail in an article entitled "The Socialisation of Banking" in The Political Quarterly April – June 1933.

== The affair with Jennie Lee ==
According to her autobiography, Jennie Lee first properly met Wise in Vienna in 1929 during the summer recess, where he had followed her. She considered this was a pleasant coincidence but admitted that if she had known him better, she would not have been so easily deceived. Their affair is detailed at some length in both her own book My Life with Nye and in her biography by Patricia Hollis and lasted until his death in November 1933.

They were both close friends with Charles Trevelyan and visited his house and estate at Wallington in Northumberland. Trevelyan is described by his great niece Laura Trevelyan as being dashing, handsome, wealthy, sporty and ideologically left wing. He was glamorous and very attractive to women. She reports that he enjoyed a close friendship with Jennie Lee for the rest of their lives.

Wise's affair with Lee was intense and included visits to Russia and the Caucasus in 1930 and in 1932. The affair was common knowledge around Westminster and Beatrice Webb noted in her diary that ‘it was a scandal in the Party'. Although his wife behaved with great dignity, she did threaten Wise with divorce. However, Jennie Lee did not want a divorce pointing out the implications, their age differences and the problems it would cause to their careers.

== Death ==
Wise died suddenly at Wallington, while on a walk on the estate on 5 November 1933. He was 48. The funeral was held at Bury St. Edmunds St. James's Cathedral Church on 9 November 1933 and he was buried in the cemetery, Bury St. Edmunds. A memorial service was held the next day at St. Martin-in-the Fields, London on Friday 10 November 1933.

== Family ==
His brother, Frederick John Wise (born 10 April 1887), was a Member of Parliament (MP) for King's Lynn 1945–51 and was created 1st Baron Wise of King's Lynn in the County of Norfolk, 24 December 1951.

Edward Wise married Dorothy Lilian Owen (1886–1974), eldest daughter of William Shepperson Owen and Lilian Maud Southam on 12 November 1912. Her grandfather was Thomas Southam (1818–1895), founder of the wine merchants Thomas Southam and Son, Mayor of Shrewsbury on four occasions. She was the author of Piers Plowman: A comparison with some earlier and contemporary French allegories, based on her M.A. thesis at Royal Holloway College. They had three daughters and a son – Margaret Dorothy (1913–1994), Mary Frances (1918–2007), Helen Irene (1920–2001) and Thomas Frank (1924–2010). His grandchildren include William John Francis Jenner, English sinologist and specialist translator of Chinese literature, and Peter Jenner, British music manager, former record producer and copyright commentator.

== Publications ==
- Wage Boards in England, American Economic Review Vol. 11 no. 1 March 1912
- The Work of the Supreme Economic Council in A History of the Peace Conference of Paris edited by H.W.V. Temperley Vol. I published under the auspices of the Institute of International Affairs, Henry Frowde, Hodder and Stoughton, London 1920. (Digitised by the Internet Archive in 2007, with funding from Microsoft Corporation A history of the Peace Conference of Paris)
- The civil service in relation to industry and commerce in The Civil Servant and His Profession: series of lectures delivered to the Society of Civil Servants in March 1920 Pitman, London
- Profiteering in Bread. How to Stop It. Evidence Given by E.F. Wise on Behalf of the Independent Labour Party Before the Royal Commission on Food Prices
- The Russian Co-operative Movement, Baron, N. and Wise E. F. Narodny Bank, London 1926
- The Living Wage H.N.Brailsford, John H. Hobson, A. Creech Jones, E.F. Wise. ILP Publication Department, Blackfriars Press, Leicester 1926
- Consumers Cooperation in Soviet Russia, Cooperative Union, Manchester 1929
- The History of the Ministry of Food, Economic Journal 1929 Vol. 39 Issue 156 pp. 566 – 571
- The stabilisation of Wheat Prices, Farmers Club 1930
- Soviet Russia's Place in World Trade, Journal of the Royal Institute of International Affairs Vol. 9 No. 4 July 1930 pp. 498 – 518
- An alternative to tariffs The Political Quarterly Vol. 2 Issue 2, April 1931 pp 186 – 203
- A Reply to Prof. Robbins Political Quarterly Vol. 2 Issue 3 July 1931 pp. 411 – 416
- The socialisation of banking Political Quarterly April–June 1933 Vol. IV Number 2 pp. 169 –181
- The Control of Finance and the Financiers in Problems of a Socialist Government Sir Stafford Cripps et al., Victor Gollancz, London 1933

Parliament of the United Kingdom
| Preceded by John Loder | Member of Parliament for Leicester East; 1929 – 1931 | Succeeded by Abraham Lyons |
Party political offices
| Preceded by Fred Longden | Midlands Division representative on the National Administrative Council of the Independent Labour Party; 1927–1931 | Succeeded by Jim Garton |
| Preceded by New position | Chairman of the Socialist League; 1932 – 1933 | Succeeded by Stafford Cripps |
