= William Mellor (journalist) =

British journalist

- Born: 1888
- Died: 1942 (aged 53–54)
- Occupations: Editor of the Daily Herald. First editor of Tribune.
- Known for: Founding member of the Communist Party of Great Britain (CPGB). Conscientious objector during WWI.

William Mellor (1888–1942) was a left-wing British journalist.

Mellor was born in Crewe, where his father was a Unitarian clergyman. He attended Willaston School, an establishment set up to provide education for the sons of impoverished Unitarian ministers. He then went on to Exeter College, Oxford.

A Guild Socialist during the 1910s, Mellor worked closely with G. D. H. Cole, founding the National Guilds League with him in 1915. He joined the Daily Herald in 1913 as a journalist, and was imprisoned during the First World War as a conscientious objector, returning to the Herald on his release.

He was a founder-member of the Communist Party of Great Britain in 1920, but resigned in 1924. He became editor of the Herald in 1926, succeeding George Lansbury when the Trades Union Congress took over the paper, and was fired in 1930 soon after Odhams Press took half-ownership with the TUC. He was the first editor of Tribune 1937–38, but was sacked after falling out with Stafford Cripps over the latter's proposal for a Popular Front of socialist and non-socialist parties against fascism. For the last ten years of his life, though married with a family, he conducted an affair with the young Barbara Castle.

== Works ==
- (with G. D. H. Cole) The Meaning of Industrial Freedom, 1918
- Direct Action, 1920.
- The co-operative movement and the fight for socialism, 1933

Media offices
Preceded by Hamilton Fyfe	Editor of the Daily Herald; 1926–1930	Succeeded by W. H. Stevenson
New post	Editor of Tribune; 1937–1938	Succeeded by H. J. Hartshorn
Party political offices
Preceded by Stafford Cripps	Chairman of the Socialist League; 1936–1937	Organisation dissolved
