= J. F. Horrabin =

- Portrait of Horrabin by Howard Coster, ca. 1945
- Born: James Francis Horrabin; 1 November 1884; Peterborough, England
- Died: 2 March 1962 (aged 77); London, England
- Occupations: Writer, politician, cartoonist, cartographer
- Years active: 1905–1950
- Spouse: Winifred Horrabin

Member of Parliament for Peterborough
- In office 30 May 1929 – 7 October 1931
- Preceded by: Sir Henry Brassey, Bt
- Succeeded by: David Cecil, Lord Burghley

James Francis "Frank" Horrabin (1 November 1884 – 2 March 1962) was an English socialist and for some time Communist radical writer and cartoonist. For two years he was Labour Member of Parliament for Peterborough. He attempted to construct a socialist geography and was an associate of David Low and George Orwell.

Born in Peterborough and educated at Stamford School, he studied metalwork design at the Sheffield School of Art, where he met his future wife, Winifred Batho, whom he married in 1911. He became a staff artist on the Sheffield Telegraph in 1906, and art editor for the Yorkshire Telegraph and Star in 1909.

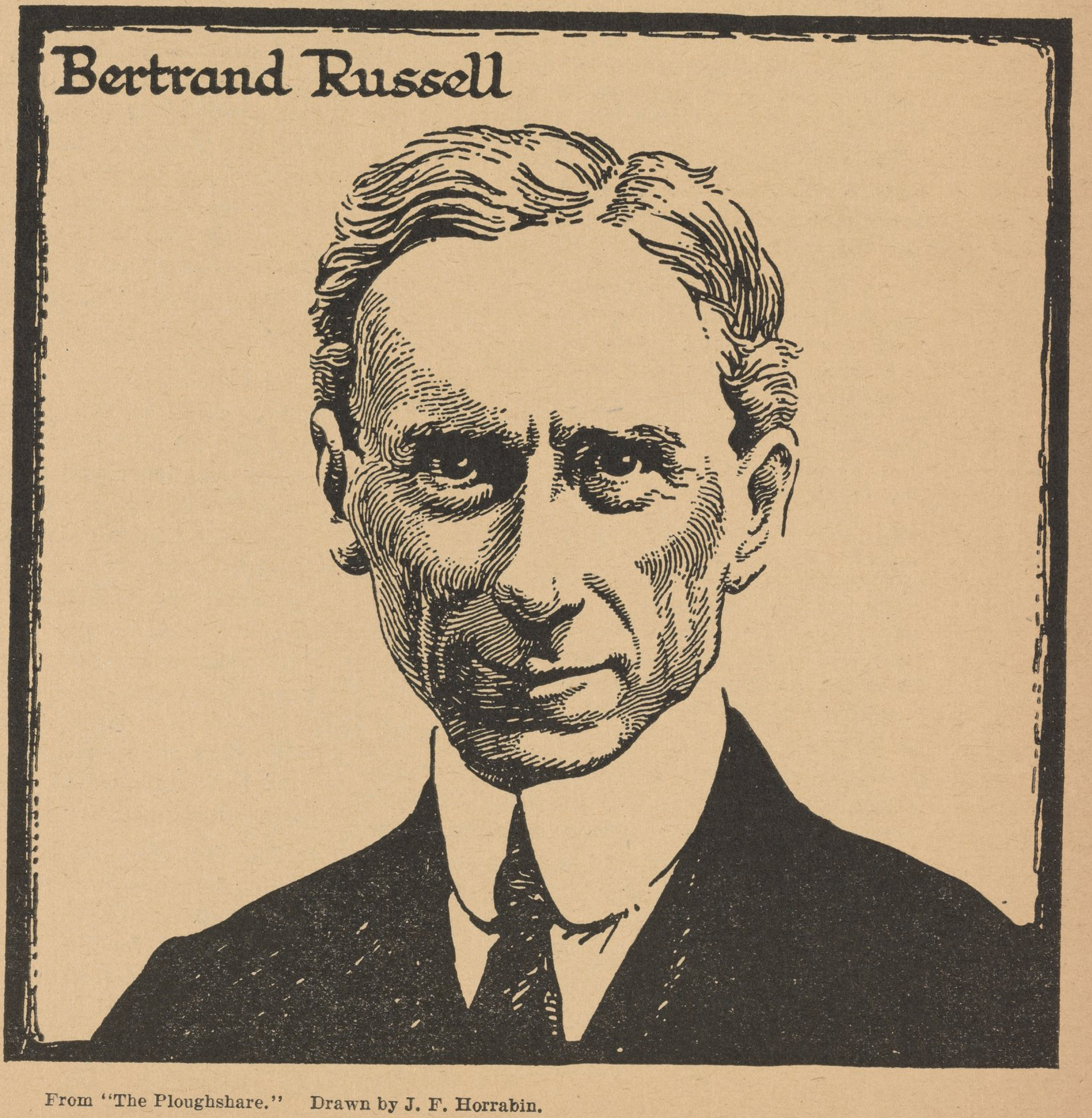
Portrait of Bertrand Russell by Horrabin

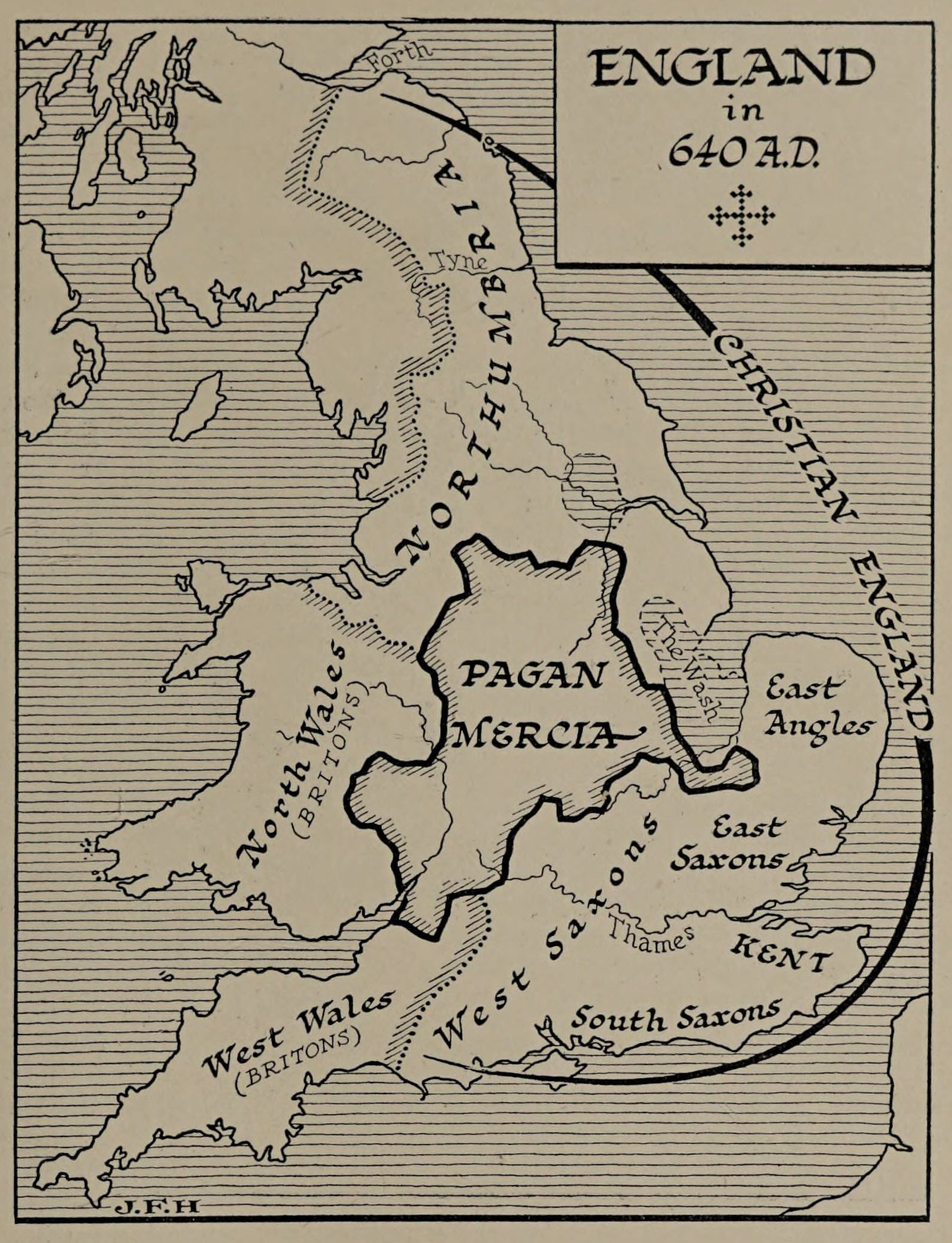
England in 640 A.D. from The Outline of History, page 329

In 1911 he moved to London as art editor of The Daily News. He drew his first maps for this paper during the Balkan War of 1912–13. He became editor of The Plebs, journal of the workers' education campaign group the Plebs' League, to which he also contributed caricatures, in 1914 and a guild socialist in 1915. He also lectured at the Central Labour College.

In 1919 he created The Adventures of the Noah Family in The Daily News, originally a daily panel cartoon, later a continuing four-panel comic strip. It featured a suburban family who shared their names with the Biblical Noah and his sons, who lived at "The Ark", Ararat Avenue with their pet bear cub, Happy. The strip continued into the 1940s, in the News Chronicle after 1930, and was collected into several hard back books, most notably the Japhet and Happy Annuals and Summer Books between 1932 and 1952, and had a fan club, The Arkubs. He illustrated H. G. Wells' The Outline of History in 1920. In 1922 he created Dot and Carrie, a strip about two office workers, for The Star, which continued until 1962, moving to the Evening News in 1960.

His 1923 text An Outline of Economic Geography, which sold in large numbers and was translated into nine other languages, attempted to provide workers with an account of economic (and political and historical) geography that used bourgeois "pure geography" but put it within a socialist and historical–materialist framework.

In 1924 he co-wrote Working Class Education with his wife Winifred. He supported the general strike in 1926, and co-wrote The Workers History of the Great Strike (1927) with Ellen Wilkinson MP and Raymond Postgate. He had a long-standing affair with Wilkinson. He was the Labour MP for Peterborough from 1929 to 1931, under the premiership of the first Labour Prime Minister, James Ramsay MacDonald. In 1930, he was one of seventeen Labour MPs to sign the "Mosley Memorandum", drawn up by Oswald Mosley. He lost his seat at the General Election of 1931 occasioned by the split in the party consequent on MacDonald forming a National Government.

In 1932 he joined the Society for Socialist Inquiry and Propaganda, becoming chairman in 1936. He also joined the national council of the Socialist League, becoming editor of its journal The Socialist and Socialist Leaguer, giving up the editorship of The Plebs. He promoted socialism through his journalism, his appearance on radio programmes like Your Questions Answered, and by illustrating educational texts like Lancelot Hogben's Mathematics for the Million (1936) and Science for the Citizen (1938), and Jawaharlal Nehru's Glimpses of World History (1939 edition). From 1934 on he produced several editions of An Atlas of Current Affairs, for which he also drew the maps.

Horrabin also supported the British Provisional Committee for the Defence of Leon Trotsky, and signed a letter defending Trotsky's right to asylum and calling for an international inquiry into the Moscow Trials.

In 1937, only a few months after its institution, the BBC Television Service produced an occasional political discussion programme called News Map, which was usually presented by the former MP. News Map did not leave the studio and was mainly interested in foreign affairs stories.

In the 1940s he co-founded the Fabian Colonial Bureau (later the Fabian Commonwealth Bureau) with Rita Hinden and Arthur Creech Jones, and edited its journal, Empire. He was chairman of the Bureau from 1945 to 1950. He also wrote a regular column for the monthly magazine Socialist Commentary, edited by Hinden. In 1947 he and Winifred divorced, and the following year he married Margaret Victoria McWilliams, a widow with whom he had been having an affair since the early 1930s. He scaled back his political activities from the 1950s due to failing health. He died of bronchopneumonia at home in Hendon, London, on 2 March 1962 aged 77. He had no children.

Parliament of the United Kingdom
| Preceded by Sir Henry Brassey, Bt | Member of Parliament for Peterborough; 1929 – 1931 | Succeeded by David Cecil, Lord Burghley |
