= Boris Krasin (policeman) =

Boris Ivanovich Krasin (Russian: Борис Иванович Красин (Ishim 1846 – June 23 [July 6] 1901) was policeman in Imperial Russia. He served a police chief in Kurgan and Tyumen. Krasin gave access to the jail in Tyumen to the American explorer, George Kennan. Before his trip to Russia, Kennan had been a supporter of the Tsarist regime, but what he encountered in the jail contributed to his subsequent condemnation of Tsarism.

== Family life ==
Boris was the son of a solicitor Ivan Vasilyevich Krasin, a Titular Councillor - a formal rank in the Imperial Table of Ranks. He married Antonina Grigorievna Kropanina, the youngest daughter of a prominent local merchant. Together they had five children:

- Leonid Krasin (1870–1926): Soviet politician, engineer, social entrepreneur, Bolshevik revolutionary politician, and a Soviet diplomat
- Herman Krasin (1871–1947): the first director of the State Institute of Structures (1927–1929)
- Alexander Borisovich (1874–1909), engineer
- Boris Krasin (1884–1936): composer and Proletkult activist
