= Boris Krasin (composer) =

Russian composer

Boris Borisovich Krasin (3 (15) April 1884, Tyumen–21 June 1936) was a Russian musician who was politically active in Proletkult and the Russian Association of Proletarian Musicians.

== Early life ==
Boris was the fifth and youngest son of Boris Ivanovich Krasin, chief of police in Tyumen. Leonid Krasin was one of his brothers.

== Musical career ==
Krasin was head of the Moscow Proletkult's Music Department in which capacity he claimed that the music provided in restaurants and cabarets was anti-art.

He was one of the founders of the Union of Composers in 1932. He joined Alexei Ogolevets to found the Autonomous Research Section (ANTES) of this organisation in Moscow, which played a major role in the research and development of electronic musical instruments.

He set poems to music such as Andrei Bely's "Чающие" (Tea Lovers), "Одиночество" (Loneliness) and "Осень" (Autumn).

He is buried in the Novodevichy Cemetery, Moscow.

== Texts ==
- 1920 "С чего и как начинать работу в области музыкального искусства" (Where and how to start working in the field of musical art) Proletarskaya Kul'tura, No.17-19, August – December, 1920
