= Avel Yenukidze =

Georgian-Soviet politician

- აბელ ენუქიძე
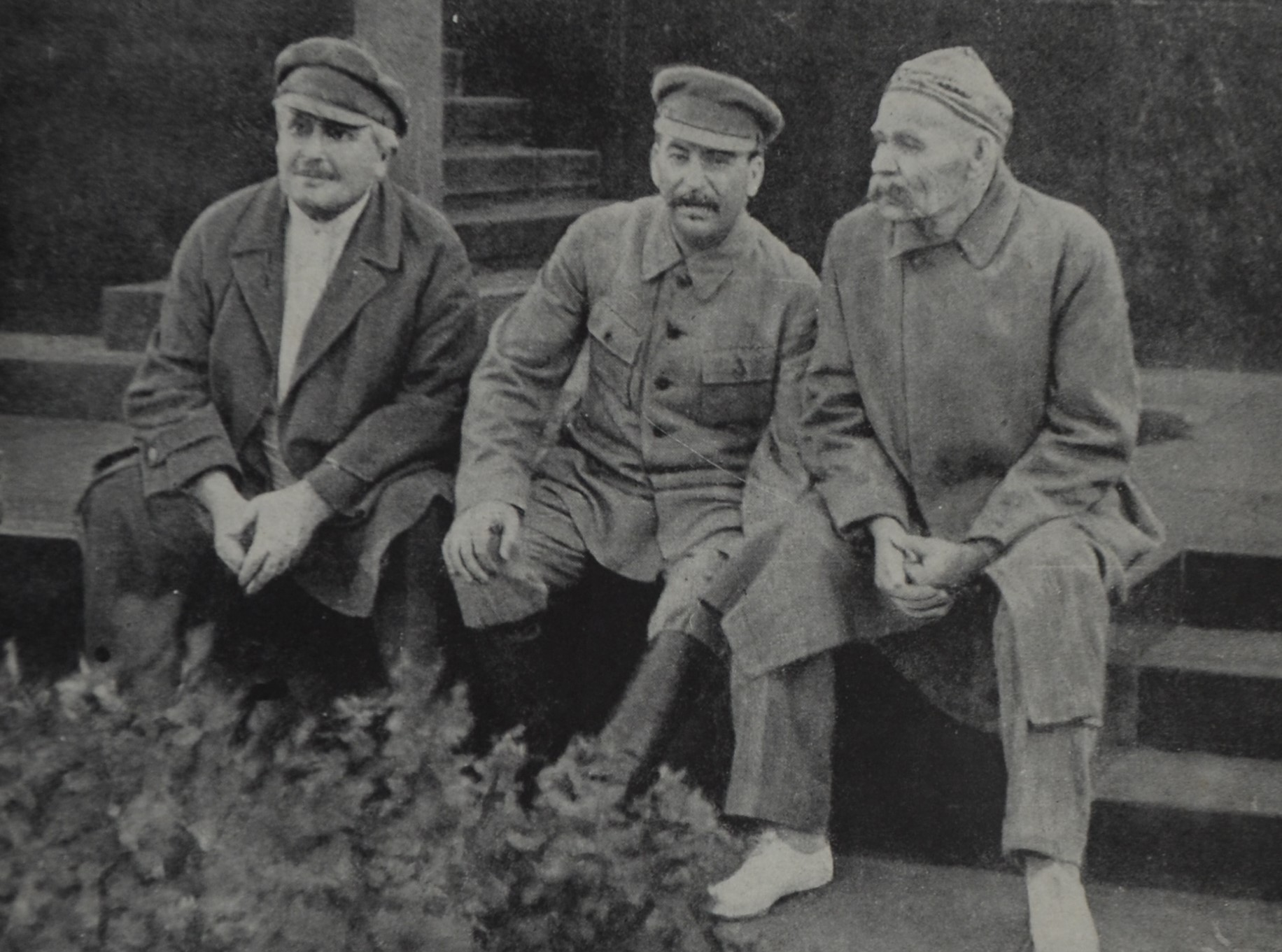
- Yenukidze, Joseph Stalin and Maxim Gorky in Red Square in 1931

Secretary of the All-Russian Central Executive Committee
- In office 1918–1935
- General Secretary: Joseph Stalin
- Preceded by: Varlam Avanesov
- Succeeded by: Leonid Serebryakov

Personal details
- Born: 19 May [O.S. 7 May] 1877
- Died: 30 October 1937 (aged 60)
- Citizenship: Soviet Union
- Party: CPSU

Avel Safronovich Yenukidze (Georgian: აბელ ენუქიძე, Abel Enukidze, Georgian pronunciation: [abel enukʰidze]; Russian: А́вель Сафро́нович Енуки́дзе; 19 May [O.S. 7 May] 1877 – 30 October 1937) was a prominent Georgian Old Bolshevik and, at one point, a member of the Central Committee of the All-Union Communist Party (b) in Moscow. In 1932, along with Mikhail Kalinin and Vyacheslav Molotov, Yenukidze cosigned the infamous "Law of Spikelets". From 1918 to 1935, Yenukidze served as the Secretary of the All-Russian Central Executive Committee and the Central Executive Committee of the Soviet Union.

He was the godfather of Joseph Stalin's wife Nadezhda Alliluyeva. He was shot during the Great Purge in 1937 and was rehabilitated posthumously.

== Early career ==
Yenukidze was the son of peasants, born in a village in Kutaisi province, Georgia. In 1893 he moved to Tiflis to study and became involved in radical politics there while a student. In his autobiography, he noted:

From the beginning of 1894 in Tiflis ... illegal student circles began to be organized. The circle in which I took part from 1894 had at first a semi-nationalist, semi-Marxist program. Since the spring of 1896, I have been a member of an already mixed circle, consisting of workers and students, and from that moment my Marxist education begins.

After graduating from Tiflis Technical College, he was employed in the main workshop of the Transcaucasian Railways in 1897–1900. He joined the Russian Social Democratic Labour Party (RSDLP) in 1898. In 1899, he moved to Baku to work on the railways there, where he met and worked with Lado Ketskhoveli. Together they created Baku's first RSDLP organisation and helped create an underground printing press in Baku, used to print RSDLP literature.

Yenukidze was arrested twice in 1902, escaped from the Tiflis Metekhi Castle in 1903 and lived in a cellar with the illegal printing press in Baku in 1903–1906. After the split in the RSDLP, he joined the Bolshevik faction. He was arrested again in 1907, 1908, 1910 and 1911, but escaped every time, conducting party work in Transcaucasia, Rostov-on-Don, St. Petersburg and Finland during his periods of freedom. He first met with V. I. Lenin, whom he had known by correspondence since 1901, at a meeting of members of the Central Committee of the RSDLP in St. Petersburg at the end of 1905.

In July 1914 he was arrested for the seventh time and in October of the same year he was exiled to Turukhansk, Yeniseysk Governorate. At the end of 1916 he was drafted into the army, where he served as a private in the 14th Siberian Rifle Regiment.

== Political career ==
Yenukidze was sent to the front through Petrograd in February 1917, arriving on February 27 (old style), the first day of the February Revolution. He took an active part in the revolutionary uprisings of the troops, then quit the army in April when he was elected to the executive committee of the Soviets. From June 1917 he was a member of the Petrograd Soviet and executive committee. He took part in the October armed uprising as a member of the Petrograd Military Revolutionary Committee and of the 2nd All-Russian Congress of Soviets.

During 1918, he was appointed Secretary of the executive committee of the Soviets, which meant that he was in charge of administration and security in the Kremlin. From December 31, 1922, to March 3, 1935, he was Secretary of the Central Executive Committee of the USSR. As Secretary he signed the decree of the Central Executive Committee issued on the day of the murder of S. M. Kirov on December 1, 1934, that changed the Code of Criminal Procedure to provide for speeded-up investigation of those accused of preparing or carrying out terrorist acts, hearing their cases without allowing for a defense, and carrying out death sentences immediately in some cases.

He was a member of the commission for organizing the funeral of Lenin and from 1924, a member of the Central Control Commission of the CPSU (b), as well as a member of the Presidium of the Central Control Commission from 1927 to 1934.

Yenukidze published his work "Our Underground Printing Houses in the Caucasus" in 1925. He was also, as one of the three most senior native Georgians in the Soviet leadership, after Joseph Stalin and Sergo Ordzhonikidze, one of four authors of The Life of Stalin, a hagiography published to coincide with Stalin's 50th birthday in 1928. His co-authors were Ordzhonikidze, Kliment Voroshilov and Lazar Kaganovich. In 1922–1934, he was also chairman of the boards of the Bolshoi Theatre and Moscow Art Theatre and was Chairman of the Commission for Control over the Daily Activities of the Academy of Sciences from 1925 through 1927.

== The "Kremlin Plot" ==
In February 1934, Yenukidze was elected a member of the Central Committee of the Communist Party of the Soviet Union (CC CPSU) at the party's 17th Congress—which later acquired the name "the Executed Congress". He was later the first member of the Central Committee to be expelled from it.

In February 1935, he was removed from his post administering the Kremlin and appointed Chairman of the Central Executive Committee of the Transcaucasian Socialist Federative Soviet Republic, which would have meant sending him back to his native Georgia. In the same month, the NKVD began a series of security checks on Kremlin staff in the wake of the assassination of Sergei Kirov.

On March 21 the Politburo sent the members of the Central Committee and commissions of party and Soviet control the "Report of the Central Committee of the All-Union Communist Party of Bolsheviks on the apparatus of the Central Executive Committee of the USSR and comrade. Yenukidze", in which Yenukidze was accused of failing to exercise sufficient political vigilance. By summer, 110 had been arrested, of whom two were sentenced to death, the rest to prison terms. They included a brother of Stalin's former opponent, Lev Kamenev.

In May, Yenukidze—who apparently had not taken up his new job—pleaded with Ordzhonikidze and Voroshilov not to be made to move to Tiflis, on health grounds, and asked to be given a post either in Moscow or the North Caucasus. He was sent to the North Caucasus to run Mineralnye Vody, the agency that supervised mineral resorts.

Two weeks after taking up this position, he returned to Moscow for a plenum of the CC CPSU, apparently unaware that it had been called to denounce him. Nikolai Yezhov, the future head of the NKVD, made his debut as a recently appointed Secretary of the CC, accusing Yenukidze of having put Stalin's life at risk by allowing potential assassins to work in the Kremlin. He was also attacked by his fellow Georgians, Ordzhonikidze and Lavrentiy Beria over his practice of giving money to former Bolsheviks who had been deprived of their livelihoods for opposing Stalin. He was expelled from the Central Committee and appointed head of the automobile works in Kharkiv.

While the accusation of lax security in the Kremlin was the pretext for humiliating Yenukidze, the real reason may have been his failure to contribute adequately to the glorification of Stalin. In particular, his memoirs published in the 1920s gave the late Lado Ketskhoveli credit for the creation of the illegal printing press in Baku at the turn of the century and made no mention of Stalin, who was then based in Tiflis. According to Leon Trotsky, Yenukidze complained privately of being under pressure to change the record for Stalin's benefit, saying: "I am doing everything he has asked me to do, but it is not enough for him. He wants me to admit that he is a genius." On 16 January 1935, Yenukdize was forced to publish a public apology, altering the record to say that Ketskhoveli was "sent to Baku" by Stalin and others to set up and to create the party organisation in Baku. Six months later, on July 22, 1935, Beria published a report, “On the Question of the History of Bolshevik Organizations in Transcaucasia”, which accused Yenukidze of having "deliberately and with hostile intent" falsified the record.

Yenukidze believed he had earned Stalin's enmity by seeking leniency for Kamenev and Zinoviev. Alexander Orlov in his book "The Secret History of Stalin's Crimes" gives Yenukidze a separate chapter, where he writes:

Yenukidze told his investigators the real reason for the conflict with Stalin. "My whole crime", he said, "is that when he told me that he wanted to arrange a trial and shoot Kamenev and Zinoviev, I tried to dissuade him. 'Soso,' I told him, 'no doubt they hurt you, but they have already suffered enough for it: you have expelled them from the party, you keep them in prison, their children have nothing to eat. Soso, I said, they are old Bolsheviks like you and me. You will not shed the blood of the old Bolsheviks! Think what the whole world will say about us!' He looked at me with such eyes, as if I had killed his own father, and said: 'Remember, Avel, whoever is not with me is against me!'"

According to the memoirs of Grigori Tokaev, who was a member of an underground opposition group in the Soviet Union, Yenukidze was "a convinced communist of the right wing" who tolerated "under him a handful—but no more—of men who were technically efficient and useful to the community but who were anti-communists." Tokaev claimed Yenukidze belonged to an opposition group with Boris Sheboldayev, and that the latter told Tokaev that their plan was to reform the USSR into a "free union of free peoples," as "Stalinism [had] meant the restoration of Tsarism in a still more monstrous form."

On September 7, 1935, Stalin sent Kaganovich, Yezhov and Molotov a coded message in which he called Yenukidze's appointment to Mineralnye Vody a mistake. He demanded that he be transferred to a secondary position in Rostov-on-Don or Kharkiv. In addition, Stalin accused Ordzhonikidze of continuing to "befriend" Yenukidze.

Yenukidze for some time ignored the direct order of the Politburo to go to Kharkiv for the post of head of the office of the road transport department, but in the end he was forced to leave Mineralnye Vody. His last position before the arrest was the director of the Kharkiv regional autotranstrust. Despite such defiant behavior, in June 1936 Yenukidze was reinstated in the party at the plenum of the Central Committee of the All-Union Communist Party of Bolsheviks (most likely, under pressure from Stalin's "inner circle"). Six months later, on February 11, 1937, a week before Ordzhonikidze's death, he was arrested in Kharkiv.

After his arrest, Yenukidze was accused of treason and espionage, as well as involvement in the assassination attempt on Andrei Zhdanov. He was also accused of participating in the so-called "military-fascist conspiracy in the Red Army" ("the Tukhachevsky Case"), which supposedly aimed to carry out a military coup in the USSR and overthrow the power of the Bolshevik Party. At the same time, according to investigators, Yenukidze was one of the key figures in this conspiracy: Yenukidze was accused of having recruited Tukhachevsky back in 1928. Finally he was also charged with using his political position to coerce underage women into improper sexual relations. (Note: Maria Svanidze, who was part of Stalin's family circle, wrote in her diary on June 28, 1935: "Abel, undoubtedly, sitting in such a position, colossally influenced our life for 17 years after the revolution. Being depraved and voluptuous himself, he tainted everything around him: he enjoyed pandering, family discord, and the seduction of girls. Having in his hands all the blessings of life, unattainable for everyone, especially in the first years after the revolution, he used all this for personal dirty purposes, buying women and girls. It hurts to talk and write about it. Being erotically abnormal and, obviously, not a 100% man, he switched to younger and younger every year, and finally reached girls at 9-11 years old, corrupting their imagination, corrupting them, if not physically, then morally. This is the foundation of all the outrages that took place around him. Women with suitable daughters owned everything. Girls, as unnecessary, were slipped to other men, more unstable morally. The staff was recruited into the institution only on the basis of gender, which Abel liked. To justify his debauchery, he was ready to encourage him in everything.") Yenukidze was the only Soviet figure of this level who was officially accused of systematic seduction of underage girls.

Yenukidze's name was included in Stalin's execution list dated July 10, 1937, but Stalin deleted it, accompanying the deletion with a note: "wait until". Apparently, Stalin intended to use Yenukidze as one of the defendants at the Third Moscow Trial, which was already being prepared at that time ("Anti-Soviet Bloc of Rights and Trotskyists"), but it was not possible to arrange this. He was therefore reincluded in the Stalinist execution list, dated October 21, 1937, and sentenced to death by Stalin, Molotov, Voroshilov and Kaganovich. On October 29, 1937, the verdict was formally approved at a meeting of the Military Collegium of the Supreme Court of the USSR.

== Arrest and execution ==
Yenukidze was arrested on 11 February 1937. During the purges, it was comparatively rare for the Soviet press to publicise executions, apart from those of the defendants at show trials. In a rare exception to this rule, it was reported in Pravda that Yenukdize and six others had been tried in private on 15 December 1937, and executed on 20 December. His co-defendants were said to have been the Armenian diplomat, Lev Karakhan, the former Georgian party secretary Mamia Orakhelashvili, two former leading officials from the North Caucasus, V.F. Larin and Boris Sheboldayev, the diplomat Vladimir Tsukerman, and the mysterious 'Baron' Boris Steiger.

During the largest of the Moscow trials, in March 1938, Yenukidze was posthumously denounced by one of the leading defendants, Genrikh Yagoda, the former head of the NKVD, as the linchpin of the supposed 'rightist conspiracy' and the principal organiser of the assassination of Kirov, and the supposed murder by poisoning of Maxim Gorky.

He was rehabilitated and posthumously readmitted to the communist party in 1960.

== Personality ==
By all accounts, Yenukidze was one of the most amiable and least ambitious officials in Stalin's circle. Leon Trotsky acknowledged that "he was no careerist and certainly not a scoundrel." Alexander Gregory Barmine described him as "the very soul of kindness and sensitiveness towards the needs and feelings of others...human ..., sympathetic." And the French communist Victor Serge wrote that:

He was a fair-headed Georgian, with a kind sturdy face lit up by blue eyes. His bearing was corpulent and grand, that of a mountain-dweller born and bred. He was affable, humorous and realistic...In the discharge of these high offices, he proved himself a man of human feeling, and as liberal and large-hearted as it was possible to be in that age.

When the poet Anna Akhmatova was seeking Osip Mandelstam after his arrest in May 1934, Yenukidze was the only high-ranking official to receive her. "He listened to her carefully, but said not a word".

However, he was also debauched. While in exile in Siberia, he had an affair with the future wife of Kliment Voroshilov and, while running the Kremlin, he reputedly abused his position to seduce younger and younger women.

== In literature ==
A character named Arkady Apollonich Sempleyarov, 'chairman of the Moscow Theatres' Acoustics Commission', based on Yenukidze appears briefly in The Master and Margarita by Mikhail Bulgakov. The malicious Koroviev, one of the Devil's companions, is giving a stage performance and is challenged by Sempleyarov, who speaks in "a pleasant and supremely self-confident baritone" to explain how he performs his magic tricks. Fagotto's response is to reveal to the entire audience that Sempleyarov, whose wife is sitting alongside him, had secretly spent four hours the previous evening with an actress when he claimed to have been at a meeting.

== See also ==
- Outline of the Russian Revolution and Civil War
- Bibliography of the Russian Revolution and Civil War
- Bibliography of Stalinism and the Soviet Union
- Index of Old Bolsheviks
- Index of articles related to the Russian Revolution and Civil War
- Transcaucasian Socialist Federative Soviet Republic
