= Supreme Economic Council =

The Supreme Economic Council was established in February 1919 at the Paris Peace Conference by the allied powers Belgium, France, Italy, the United Kingdom, and the United States.

== Background ==
The Allied Maritime Transport Council (AMTC) had been established in 1917 to co-ordinate the tight control of all shipping of the Allies of World War I. Even prior to the armistice of 11 November 1918 the AMTC had been making preparations for changes to introduce in the event of fighting ceasing. In particular they had sent a proposal that German and Austrian ships should be placed under their control as part of the armistice agreement – however they did not succeed in this. By 13 November, two days after the armistice, the British government proposed to their counterparts in France, Italy and the United States that the AMTC be transformed into a "General Economic Council". However the American government wanted the previous organisation to be discontinued, with a new organisation being set up to deal with such economic problems as arose. After discussion amongst the parties involved an agreement to set up the Allied Supreme Council of Supply and Relief was reached on 12 December 1918, with the organisation holding its first meeting on 11 January 1919, a week before the actual Paris Peace Conference opened.

== Establishment ==
By the beginning of February 1919, the Supreme Economic Council was created by merging the Allied Maritime Transport Council with the barely established Allied Supreme Council of Supply and Relief, the Inter-Allied Food Council, and the Superior Blockade Council. Its role was to advise the conference on economic measures to be taken pending the negotiation of peace, but also more urgently to coordinate the distribution of resources and the access to raw material in the devastated European economy.

Specialized commissions were appointed to study particular problems: the organization of a League of Nations and the drafting of its Covenant; and the determination of responsibility for the war and guarantees. The Supreme Economic Council was soon undermined, however, by a growing division of views between France and Italy on one side, advocating a continuation of the wartime joint action, and the UK and U.S. on the other side, preferring a rapid return to market-oriented business as usual.

== See also ==
- Reparation Commission
- Economic and Financial Organization of the League of Nations
