= Alexander Tsulukidze =

Georgian revolutionary

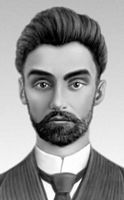
Sasha Tsulukidze

Alexander "Sasha" Tsulukidze (Georgian: ალექსანდრე “საშა” წულუკიძე; Russian: Александр Григорьевич Цулукидзе; 1 November 1876, Khoni – 8 June 1905, Kutaisi) was a Georgian social-democratic revolutionary and journalist.

== Biography ==
Born in Khoni, western Georgia (then part of the Russian Empire), Sasha came from a prominent princely family. His father belonged to the old Imeretian noble house of Tsulukidze and his mother to that of Shervashidze. He joined the Kutaisi-based Marxist organization in 1896 and became involved in underground student activities while studying in Moscow between 1897 and 1899. Returning to Georgia in 1899, he organized a series of workers’ strikes in Tbilisi, Batumi, and other towns in Georgia. He was an active proponent of Lenin’s line within the Caucasus structures of the Russian Social Democratic Labour Party and energetically engaged in pro-Bolshevik journalism, criticizing legal Marxists, nationalists, and Mensheviks.

Together with Joseph Stalin, he was a leader of a Bolshevik revolutionary minority in the Georgian Marxist milieu at a time when the dominant force were the Mensheviks led by Noe Zhordania. During the Russian Revolution of 1905, he was briefly put in the Metekhi prison. Tsulukidze died of tuberculosis in Kutaisi shortly after his release. His funeral attracted thousands who followed the open coffin to his native Khoni singing the Marseillaise.

In the Soviet Union, Tsulukidze's native town of Khoni was known as Tsulukidze from 1936 to 1990.
