= Socialist League (UK, 1932) =

The Socialist League was an organisation inside the British Labour Party, which sought to push it to the left. It was formed in 1932, through a merger between the National ILP Affiliation Committee (NILP) and the Society for Socialist Inquiry and Propaganda (SSIP), and ceased to exist in 1937.

== Political origins ==
The Society for Socialist Inquiry and Propaganda was created by G. D. H. Cole in June 1931, and principally consisted of guild socialists, including Frank Horrabin and Bill Mellor. Cole hoped to attract trade unionists, but although Ernest Bevin agreed to become honorary chairman, Arthur Pugh was the only prominent trade unionist to become actively involved.

The National ILP Affiliation Committee was founded by a group of Independent Labour Party (ILP) members who disagreed with their party's decision in 1932 to disaffiliate from the Labour Party. Led by Frank Wise, they entered into negotiations with the SSIP about a merger, which was achieved in October 1932, forming the Socialist League. Wise was chosen as the new league's first chairman; Cole opposed this, hoping that Bevin would take the post. Cole voted against the merger but remained for a time with the League; Ernest Bevin disassociated himself from the new organisation and its activities.

J. T. Murphy was expelled from the Communist Party of Great Britain in 1932 and went on to join the Socialist League. By 1934 he was National Secretary.

== Relations with the Labour Party ==
Unlike its two predecessors, the League gained affiliation to the Labour Party. Its members included six Labour Members of Parliament: Clement Attlee, Seymour Cocks, Stafford Cripps, David Kirkwood, Neil Maclean and Alfred Salter. It gained great success at the 1932 Labour Party conference, winning votes committing the party to socialist legislation and, in particular, the nationalisation of the Bank of England and joint stock banks.

The group next moved to develop its own policy platform. This advocacy of a platform separate from that of the Labour Party alienated some of its prominent supporters, outside and inside the House of Commons, and by the end of 1933 G.D.H. Cole, David Kirkwood M.P., Frederick Pethick-Lawrence, Arthur Pugh and Alfred Salter M.P. had all resigned. This brought Cripps to greater prominence, and he was elected chairman of the League that year. The League moved from research and propaganda to lobbying inside the Labour Party for particular policies.

== The Unity Campaign ==
Its greatest effort was the Unity Campaign of 1937 which, in a response to events abroad, attempted to bring together all left-wing political forces in the country, notably the ILP and the Communist Party, in an anti-fascist united front.

Launched in January 1937 in Manchester, it signed up supporters, simultaneously, at the city's Free Trade Hall, the Princess Theatre and the Theatre Royal. Aneurin Bevan and Ellen Wilkinson were among the signatories to this campaign for unity on the left and arms for Spain. The fortnightly Tribune magazine, financed by Stafford Cripps and George Strauss (Labour MP for Lambeth North), was set up as the mouthpiece for the movement.

For several weeks thereafter speakers for the campaign—Jimmie Maxton, Fenner Brockway, Harry Pollitt, Nye Bevan, Ellen Wilkinson, Stafford Cripps, Barbara Betts, Bill Mellor and Michael Foot—spoke at meetings up and down the country. The Labour Party, however, regarded this as yet another form of "entry-ism" by the Communist Party and on 27 January 1937 it disaffiliated the League, giving its members until June to quit either the Labour Party or the League.

The League dissolved itself in May 1937. At a conference in Hull "a Labour Unity Committee was formed, consisting of many ex-members of the League and their pro-Unity Labour Party friends" to campaign on similar issues, but events in the USSR and in Spain rapidly undermined its appeal.

== Britain after a Socialist Victory ==
Looking to the future after victory at the polls, the Socialist League was obsessed by the fear that capitalists would fight back once they lost power. Harold Laski repeatedly warned that a socialist government would have to use violence to get its way.

The Socialist League demanded that a future socialist government should immediately pass an Emergency Powers Act, establishing a temporary dictatorship that would be ready to suppress the capitalist counter-revolution. The mainstream Labour Party, however, believed firmly in parliamentarism at all times, and rejected any suggestion of a socialist emergency.

== Executive ==
Year	Chair	Treasurer	Member	Member	Member	Member	Member	Member	Member	Member	Member	Member
1932	Frank Wise	Dick Mitchison and Frank Wynne Davies	H. N. Brailsford	G. D. H. Cole	Stafford Cripps	Frank Horrabin	David Kirkwood	William Mellor	Charles Trevelyan	Frederick Pethick-Lawrence	Arthur Pugh	Alfred Salter
1933	Stafford Cripps	Frank Wynne Davies	H. N. Brailsford	G. D. H. Cole	Donald Barber	Frank Horrabin	Constance Borrett	William Mellor	Charles Trevelyan	Jean Thompson	Frank Wise	Eleven members from 1933
1934	Stafford Cripps	Frank Wynne Davies	H. N. Brailsford	Ithel Davies	Donald Barber	Frank Horrabin	Constance Borrett	William Mellor	Charles Trevelyan	Lionel Elvin	Dick Mitchison	Eleven members from 1933
1935	Stafford Cripps	L. A. Finn	Ruth Dodds	Ithel Davies	R. George	Frank Horrabin	Constance Borrett	William Mellor	D. N. Pritt	Lionel Elvin	Dick Mitchison	Eleven members from 1933
1936	William Mellor	L. A. Finn	Ruth Dodds	Barbara Betts	R. George	Frank Horrabin	Constance Borrett	H. N. Brailsford	Stafford Cripps	Lionel Elvin	Dick Mitchison	Eleven members from 1933
