= Cwmardy =

1937 novel by Lewis Jones about Welsh mining communities

- Author: Lewis Jones
- Language: English
- Subject: Welsh mining communities, labour struggles
- Genre: Social realism, Proletarian literature
- Publisher: Lawrence & Wishart
- Publication date: 1937
- Publication place: United Kingdom
- Media type: Print (hardback & paperback)
- Pages: 352
- ISBN: 978-0-85315-468-6
- Followed by: We Live (1939)

Cwmardy is a 1937 novel by Welsh writer Lewis Jones, based on his experiences in the Rhondda mining community. Set in the fictional mining village of Cwmardy (Welsh for "valley of horses"), modelled on Jones's hometown of Clydach Vale, the novel chronicles the Lovely family across several generations and depicts major industrial disputes similar to the Cambrian Combine strike and Tonypandy riots.

Considered one of the most important works of Welsh industrial fiction, Cwmardy was followed by a sequel, We Live (1939).

== Plot ==
The central narrative of the novel focuses on Len Roberts, a miner's son, who grows up witnessing the transformation of Welsh mining communities. As a young man, Len becomes involved in trade union activities and is gradually radicalised by the poor working conditions, industrial accidents, and exploitation he observes. His political awakening intensifies during a major strike that bears striking similarities to the Cambrian Combine strike of 1910–11, complete with violent confrontations between miners and police reminiscent of the Tonypandy riots.

The novel portrays the strike's devastating impact on the community, with families facing starvation and eviction whilst the mine owners bring in strikebreakers protected by police and military forces. Jones depicts scenes of mass picketing, street battles, and the eventual end of the strike as the miners win a "minimum wage" when the owners realise that reducing pay for cut coal will not be accepted. The win is short-lived however as war is declared and the community up-ended as many men enlist. Len tries to sign up but is told he is unfit, but his father, Big Jim, who is a veteran from the Boer War goes instead.

Throughout the narrative, Jones weaves in the cultural and religious life of the South Wales Valleys, showing how traditional Nonconformist values come into conflict with emerging socialist ideas. The novel explores themes of solidarity, class consciousness, and the gradual politicisation of the Welsh working class. Len's journey from a naive young miner to a committed socialist organiser reflects the broader transformation of Welsh industrial society.

The story culminates with Len's full embrace of Communist politics and his recognition that only through organised struggle can the working class achieve meaningful change. The novel ends with a sense of continuing struggle, setting the stage for the sequel We Live, which would continue the Roberts family saga into the 1920s and 1930s.

== Historical context ==
Jones wrote Cwmardy in the early 1930s, drawing on his experiences as a miner and Communist Party organiser following the General Strike of 1926. The novel depicts industrial conflicts based on the Cambrian Combine strike of 1910-11 and the Tonypandy riots.

Born in Clydach Vale in 1897, Jones witnessed the defeat of the 1926 General Strike and the subsequent depression in Welsh mining communities. His background informed the novel's portrayal of mining life and strike impacts on families. The novel also reflects the period's shift from traditional Nonconformist chapel influence to secular socialist politics.

Published in 1937 during the rise of fascism and the Spanish Civil War, the novel served both as historical record and contemporary political statement. Jones himself fought with the International Brigades in Spain.

== Reception and significance ==
Cwmardy has been recognised as a significant work of proletarian literature and Welsh industrial fiction. Literary critic Gustav Klaus described it as one of the most authentic depictions of working-class life in British literature, noting Jones's firsthand knowledge of mining communities.

Contemporary reviews praised the novel's realistic portrayal of Welsh mining life. Ron Berry, writing in Planet magazine, highlighted Jones's ability to combine political commitment with literary skill, particularly in depicting the human cost of industrial disputes. Scholar John Pikoulis noted the novel's importance in documenting working-class experience during the Great Unrest period.

The novel has been studied as an example of social realism in Welsh literature. Historian Dai Smith positioned Cwmardy within the broader tradition of Welsh industrial writing, emphasising its role in preserving working-class memory of the pre-war period. Literary scholars have praised Jones's technique of blending personal narrative with broader social and political themes.

== Legacy ==
Cwmardy became a foundational text of Welsh proletarian literature, inspiring later industrial novels including Alexander Cordell's Rape of the Fair Country and influencing the development of Welsh working-class writing. The novel's authentic portrayal of mining communities established a template for subsequent fictional treatments of Welsh industrial history.

The work has remained continuously in print since its 1937 publication, with multiple editions released by Lawrence & Wishart. Cwmardy is studied in universities as a key text in Welsh literature and British working-class fiction, and has been translated into several languages including Welsh and German.

The novel's depiction of the fictional strike has shaped popular understanding of the Tonypandy riots and Cambrian Combine strike, sometimes blurring the line between historical fact and literary interpretation.

== See also ==
- History of the socialist movement in the United Kingdom
- Cambrian Combine strike
- Tonypandy riots
- Plebs' League
