= Cambrian Colliery =

Former Welsh coal mine

Coordinates: 51.6241°N 3.4883°W

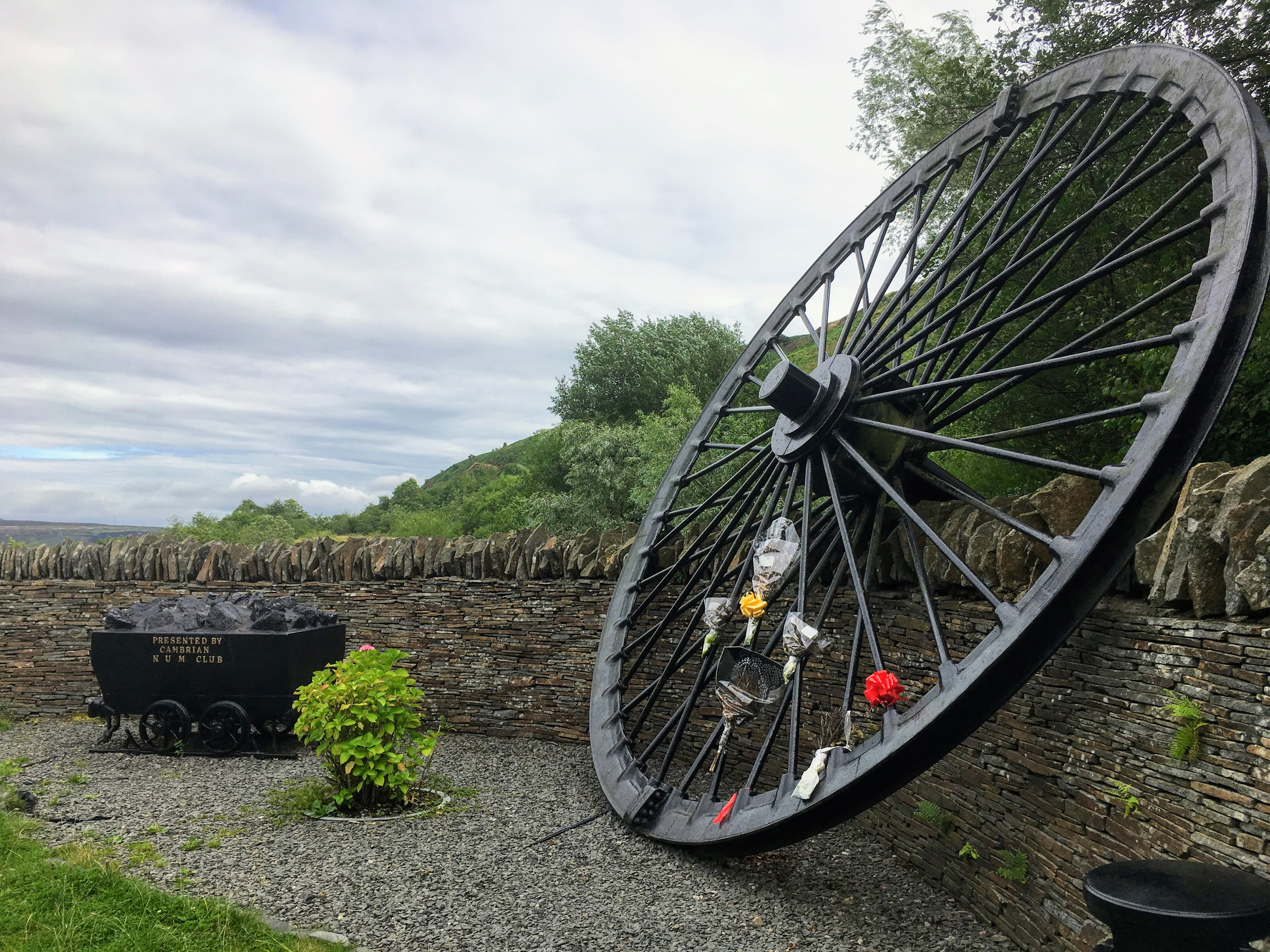
Cambrian Colliery Memorial, near Clydach Vale

The Cambrian Colliery was a large coal mine that operated between 1872 and 1967 near Clydach Vale in the Rhondda Valley, south Wales. It is notable for its huge production and for two infamous explosion disasters, in 1905 and 1965, in which a total of 64 miners were killed. Its owners sank the first pits into a rich coal seam in the 1870s from which, within 20 years, over 700 tons were being extracted daily. The complex was connected to the Taff Vale Railway and had room in its sidings for over 840 wagons. The colliery's workforce, which numbered over 4,000 in 1913, was prominently involved in the Tonypandy Riot of 1910.

== 1905 explosion disaster ==
On 10 March 1905, an explosion occurred at the Cambrian Colliery No.1. The explosion was heard for miles all around the valleys and resulted in the loss of 33 lives and serious injury to 14 others. The accident happened between the day and night shifts, otherwise the death toll would have been far higher. Before being forced back by fire, early rescue teams found and saved 50 uninjured survivors and 13 who were seriously hurt. The fire took five days to extinguish and there were no more survivors. Most of the victims are buried at Trealaw Cemetery in Trealaw.

=== Notable survivor ===
At the time of the disaster, George Brace, brother of prominent unionist William Brace, was employed as an engine driver at the colliery. He decided to leave the mining industry to build up the family bakery business, which has now been run by his descendants for over a century. He named his house Cambrian House in memory of the disaster.

== 1965 explosion disaster ==
On 17 May 1965, a second major mining accident occurred at the Cambrian Colliery. An explosion caused by firedamp, after poor ventilation allowed a build-up of flammable gas, killed 31 miners. The ignition point was later identified as an electric arc on an open switch panel which was being worked on. This was the last major mining disaster in South Wales history.
