= Brace's Bakery =

Crumlin-based Welsh bakery

Braces Bakery Limited

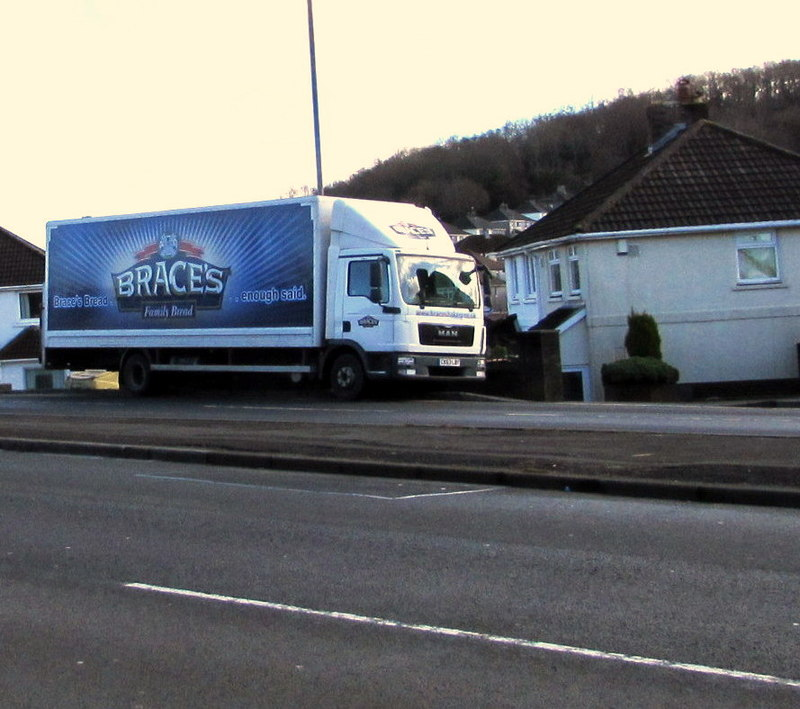
- A Brace's vehicle delivering produce
- Type: Limited company
- Founded: 1902
- Headquarters: Crumlin, Caerphilly, Wales
- Key people: Mark and Jonathan Brace, Directors
- Products: Bread, cakes, crumpets, teacakes Welsh cakes
- Revenue: ▲£ 37.1 million (2023)
- Net income: ▲£ 0.8 million (2023)
- Number of employees: 285 (2023)
- Website: www.bracesbakery.co.uk/

Brace's Bakery is a Crumlin-based Welsh bakery and bakery products brand.

== Founders ==
The company was founded in 1902 by George Brace, an engine house driver born in Abercarn who worked at the Cambrian Colliery in Clydach Vale. Brace's early operation began with a small bakery in Pontllanfraith, funded by a loan from his family.

With the business employing members of his family, George continued to work at the colliery until the 1905 mining disaster which killed 35 men, after which George left the mining industry and started to expand the business. George and his wife had five sons and two daughters, raised in a house next to the bakery with the shop at the front of it, called Cambrian House, in Pontllanfraith, then in the historic county of Monmouthshire.

William Brace, George's brother, was a miners' activist who was elected an MP in 1906 for South Glamorganshire within the Lloyd George government, and from 1918 sat for Abertillery. In 1919 William persuaded the then owners of Oakdale Colliery, the Tredegar Iron and Coal Company to hand the franchise of the bakery in the village over to George's eldest son, Ernest, who had just left the Royal Flying Corps after service in World War I. After winning the franchise, George persuaded each of his children to start bakeries in various towns and villages across the South Wales Valleys.

Ernest the eldest son successfully built his business in Oakdale, and in the late 1930s his business bought his father's business, George Brace & Sons. After Ernest's retirement, he passed the business on to his son Colin. Colin subsequently passed the running of the business on to his sons, Mark and Jonathan Brace, prior to his death at 96 in 2018. Braces today continues to operate across three sites, in Pen-y-fan, Croespenmaen, and Capel Hendre.

== Modern era ==
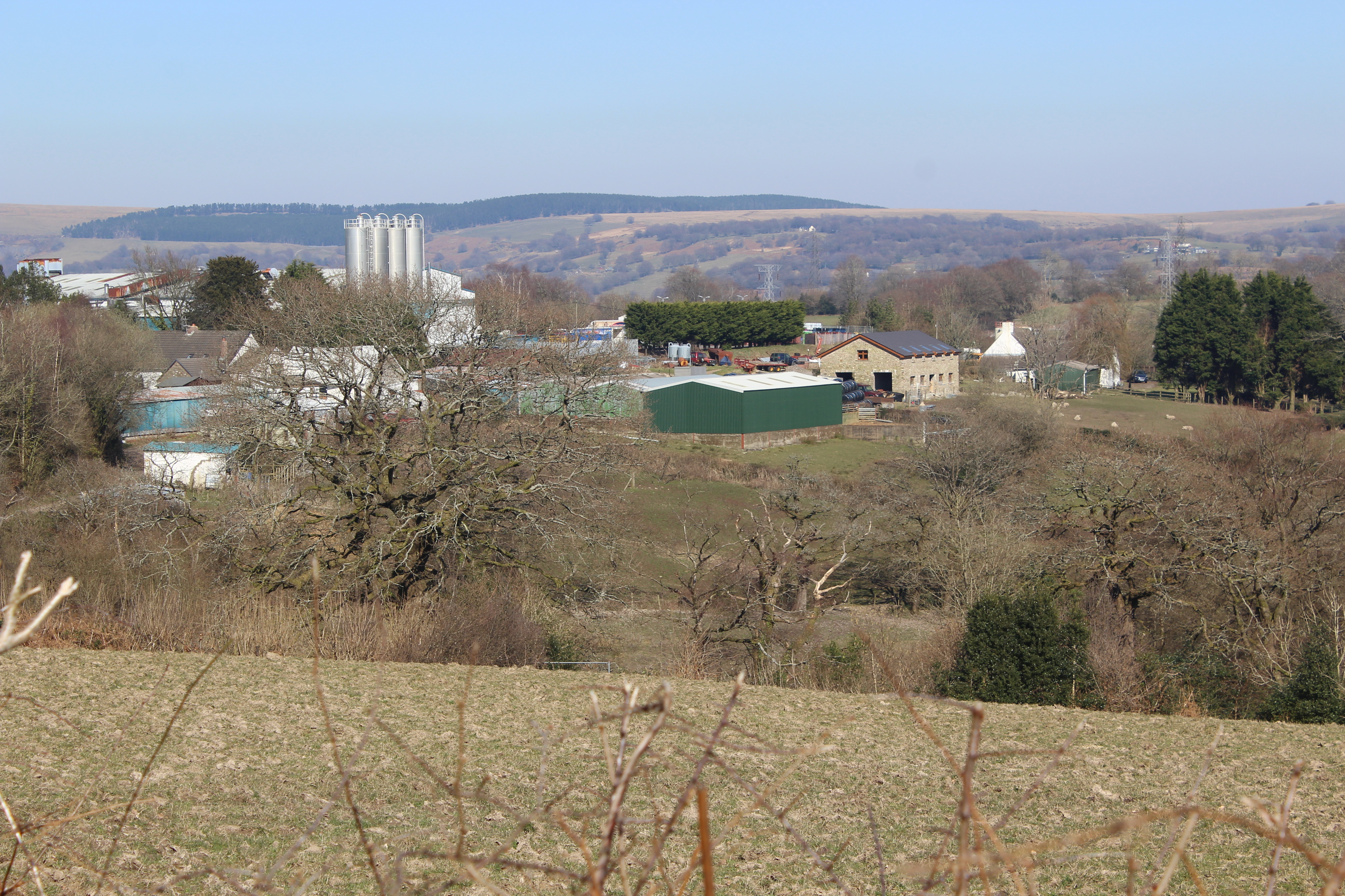
Premises at Croespenmaen, Caerphilly County Borough

Mark and Jonathan Brace expanded the company, closing the old Bakery in Oakdale in 1989 and expanding their Croespenmaen factory from 8,500 sq ft (790 m^{2}) to 60,000 sq ft (5,600 m^{2}). Changing the business from a local baker with shops and vans, to a regional bread manufacturer to serve South Wales and the West Country "to take on national bread brands".

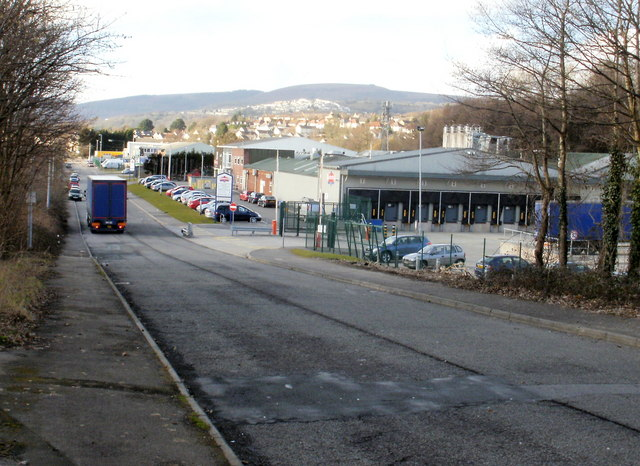
Plant in Rogerstone, Newport

In 2004 Brace's purchased another 60,000 sq ft (5,600 m^{2}) factory unit one mile away and invested £10 million installing the most up to date plant bakery, which can produce up to 900,000 loaves a week. Brace's operates plants in Croespenmaen and Pen-y-Fan Industrial Estate within a mile of each other near Blackwood, and in February 2011 bought an existing facility in Rogerstone. The Rogerstone site was closed in 2017 and rented to David Wood Foods.

In 2011, Brace's came 57th on the Price Waterhouse Coopers/Sunday Times Profit Track 100 survey. It started exporting their bread to Europe in 2011 through international export company, Foodlynx. Braces Bread can now be found in Spain, Portugal, Malta, Greece and Cyprus and is distributed to many hotels and restaurants by European Foodservice Companies as well as being sold in European supermarkets.

In 2022 the company obtained £4m in investment from HSBC UK and HSBC Equipment Finance to expand the number of product lines it offers, covering a range of baked goods including tea cakes, bread rolls, and hot cross buns. The new production line is capable of up to 16,000 rolls an hour and over one million products sold each week.

In financial year 2022 to 2023, the business reported double-digit growth in turnover and it returned to pre-tax profit, showing a turnover of £37.1m (up £6.6m year on year), and a profit before tax of £1.1m.

In 2024 it unveiled a rebrand of its packaging with new designs. Its products are supplied to major supermarkets including Tesco, Asda, Sainsbury's, Morrisons, Lidl, Co-op and other stores in South Wales and the south west.
