= List of miners' strikes =

The following is a list of miners' strikes. Miners' strikes are when miners conduct strike actions.

Strike	Country	Region	Year(s)	Larger movement
African Mine Workers' strike	South Africa	Witwatersrand	1946	
Alabama miners' strike of 1920	United States	Alabama	1920	United Mine Workers of America
Anaconda Road massacre	United States	Montana	1920	Industrial Workers of the World
Anthracite coal strike of 1902	United States	Pennsylvania	1902	United Mine Workers of America
Arizona copper mine strike	United States	Arizona	1983–1986	
Asbestos strike of 1949	Canada	Quebec	1949	
Asturian miners' strike of 1934	Spain	Asturias	1934	
Asturian miners' strike of 2012	Spain	Asturias	2012	
Australian coal strike of 1937	Australia	Victoria	1937	
Australian coal strike of 1949	Australia	New South Wales	1949	
Blackball miner's strike of 1908	New Zealand	Blackball	1908	
Bituminous coal strike of 1894	United States	Nationwide	1894	United Mine Workers of America
Bituminous coal strike of 1927	United States	Indiana	1927	
Bituminous coal strike of 1973	United States	West Virginia	1973	
Bituminous coal strike of 1974	United States	Nationwide	1974	
Bituminous coal strike of 1977–78	United States	Nationwide	1977–1978	
Broken Hill miners' strike of 1892	Australia	New South Wales	1892	
Cananea strike	Mexico	Sonora	1906	
Cape Breton coal strike of 1981	Canada	Nova Scotia	1981	United Mine Workers of America
Coal Creek miners' strike of 1891–1892	United States	Tennessee	1891–1892	
Columbine Mine strike	United States	Colorado	1927	Coal Wars
Copper Country strike of 1913–14	United States	Michigan	1913–1914	
Cripple Creek miners' strike of 1894	United States	Colorado	1894	Western Federation of Miners
Cripple Creek miners' strike of 1903	United States	Colorado	1903–1904	Colorado Labor Wars
Donbas miners' strikes	Ukraine	Donbas	1989–1998	1989 Soviet miners' strikes
Elliot Lake miners' strike of 1974	Canada	Elliot Lake	1974	United Steelworkers
Empire Zinc strike	United States	New Mexico	1950–1952	
Jiu Valley miners' strike of 1977	Romania	Transylvania	1977	
Khewra Salt Mines workers strikes 1849–1930	British India	Punjab	1849–1930	
Kosovo miners' strike of 1989	Yugoslavia	Kosovska Mitrovica	1989	
Leadville miners' strike	United States	Colorado	1896–1897	
Ludlow strike	United States	Colorado	1914	Colorado Coalfield War
Lupeni strike of 1929	Romania	Transylvania	1929	
Marikana miners' strike	South Africa	Marikana	2012	
Mount Isa Mines strike of 1964	Australia	Queensland	1964–1965	
Paint Creek–Cabin Creek strike of 1912	United States	West Virginia	1912	United Mine Workers of America
Pittston Coal strike	United States	Pennsylvania	1989–1990	
Real del Monte silver miners' strike of 1766	Kingdom of Spain	Hidalgo	1766	
South Africa miners' strike of 2007	South Africa	Nationwide	2007	
Cambrian Combine strike	Wales	South Wales	1910-11	
United Mine Workers coal strike of 1919	United States	Nationwide	1919	United Mine Workers of America
United Mine Workers coal strike of 1922	United States	Nationwide	1922	United Mine Workers
Upper Peninsula miners' strike of 1865	United States	Michigan	1865	
UK national coal strike of 1893	United Kingdom	Nationwide	1893	
UK national coal strike of 1912	United Kingdom	Nationwide	1912	
UK miners' strike of 1921	United Kingdom	Nationwide	1921	
UK miners' strike of 1926	United Kingdom	Nationwide	1926	1926 United Kingdom general strike
UK miners' strike of 1972	United Kingdom	Nationwide	1972	
UK miners' strike of 1974	United Kingdom	Nationwide	1974	
UK miners' strike of 1984–85	United Kingdom	Nationwide	1984–85	
Waihi miners' strike	New Zealand	Waihi	1912	
West Virginia coal wars	United States	West Virginia	1912–1921	United Mine Workers of America
Welsh coal strike of 1898	United Kingdom	Wales	1898	
Westmoreland County coal strike of 1910–1911	United States	Pennsylvania	1910–1911	United Mine Workers of America
Warrior Met Coal strike	United States	Alabama	2021–2023	United Mine Workers of America

== See also ==
- List of strikes
- History of coal mining in the United States
