= Cambrian Combine strike =

Workers strike in 1910–11 in Rhondda, Wales

- Part of the Great Unrest
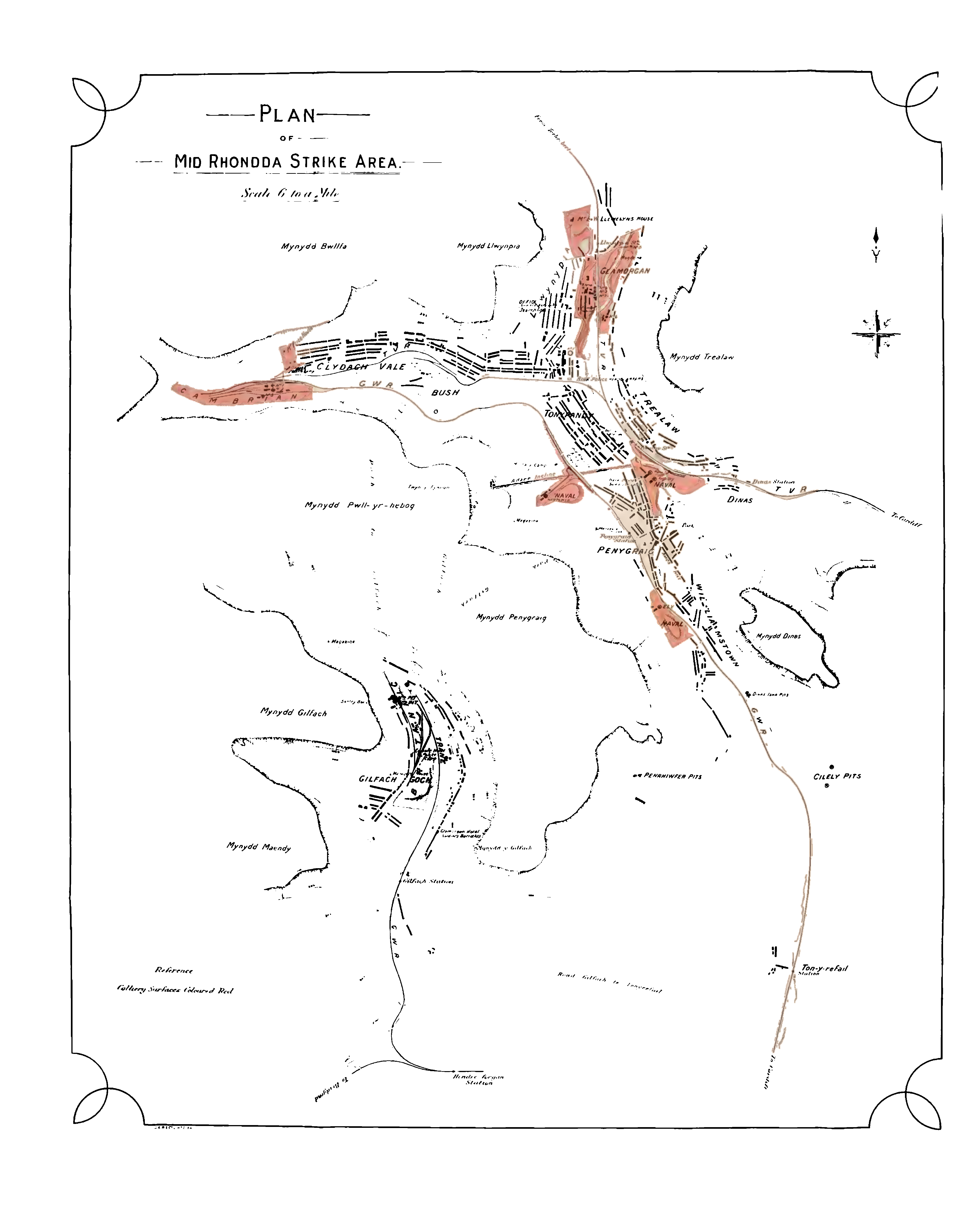
- Plan of the Mid Rhondda Strike Area, taken from D.E. Evans' Labour Strife in the South Wales Coalfield 1910-1911 (1911)
- Date: 1 September 1910 – August 1911
- Location: Rhondda, South Wales
- Caused by: Wage dispute over difficult seam at Ely Pit; Lock-out in Penygraig
- Goals: Higher wages (2s 6d per ton), better working conditions, recognition of dangerous working conditions
- Methods: Strike action; Picketing; Rioting
- Result: Strike defeated; miners forced to accept original wage offer of 2s 3d per ton

Parties
South Wales Miners' Federation	Employers: Cambrian Combine; Naval Colliery Company; Glamorgan Coal Company; Cambrian Collieries Ltd; Britannic Merthyr Coal Company; Police: Glamorgan Constabulary; Bristol Constabulary; Metropolitan Police Service; Armed forces: British Army; Lancashire Fusiliers; 18th Royal Hussars; Somerset Light Infantry

Lead figures
William Abraham ("Mabon")	David Alfred Thomas (Lord Rhondda); F. L. Davis; Captain Lionel Lindsay; Winston Churchill; General Macready

Number
12,000–30,000 miners at peak	400+ police, 1 company Lancashire Fusiliers, 1 squadron 18th Hussars

Casualties
- Arrested: 13 miners from Gilfach Goch

The Cambrian Combine strike was a major strike by coal miners in South Wales from 1910 to 1911 over wages and working conditions, culminating in violent confrontations with police and the deployment of military forces. It began as a dispute over payment rates for working a difficult coal seam at the Ely Pit in Penygraig but escalated into a wider conflict involving up to 30,000 miners.

The strike formed part of the broader Great Unrest period (1910–1914).

== International context ==
The historian Ralph Darlington has situated the Cambrian strike within a broader pattern of international labour unrest during 1910–1911, noting that syndicalist ideas spread through activist networks and translated pamphlets, with Émile Pouget's writings available in Italian, Spanish, Portuguese, English, German, and Swedish.

== Background ==
=== Working conditions and safety ===
By 1910, the South Wales Coalfield had become one of the largest coal-producing regions in the world and a dangerous working environment. The Rhondda Valley alone produced 56.8 million tons of coal in 1914, representing 19.7 percent of Britain's total coal output. The rapid industrial expansion of the late 19th century had transformed the economic and social landscape of the South Wales Valleys. Between 1881 and 1911, Glamorgan experienced inward migration of more than 330,000 people from elsewhere in Wales and neighbouring parts of England, drawn by employment opportunities in the expanding coalfield.

Despite producing 19.7 per cent of total British coal output in 1913, South Wales consistently accounted for between 20 and 30 per cent of total British colliery deaths from the 1870s through the 1930s. Between 1910 and 1914, 16.5 per cent of coal miners were injured annually, compared to 8.3 per cent of metal smelters, 5.3 per cent of railway workers, and 2 per cent of cotton industry workers.

The dangerous conditions were exemplified by the Universal Colliery at Senghenydd, which suffered two major explosions—81 deaths in 1901 and 439 deaths in 1913, the latter being Britain's worst mining disaster.

Working conditions in the South Wales coal mines were notoriously dangerous and difficult. The coal seams were particularly challenging to work due to the dry, gaseous nature of Welsh coal, which made mines prone to explosion, and the presence of numerous geological faults that created layers of rock and shale. Contemporary accounts described miners working "away from the sunlight and fresh air, sometimes in a temperature of up to 90°C, every movement of the day, inhaling coal and shale dust, perspiring so abnormally... the roof perhaps 18 inches low, perhaps 20 feet high, ears constantly strained for movements in the strata on which his limbs or his life is dependent."

Prior to 1912, there was no minimum wage in the mining industry, and miners' pay was typically calculated by the weight of saleable coal extracted rather than by hourly rates or weekly wages. This piece-rate system created ongoing disputes between miners and owners over payment rates for different seams, particularly when geological conditions made extraction more difficult or dangerous. Approximately 1,000 serious accidents occurred annually in the South Wales Coalfield, with roughly 30,000 miners receiving injuries causing disability lasting seven days or more each year.

=== Industrial concentration and the Cambrian Combine ===
The period leading up to 1910 was marked by increasing concentration of ownership in the South Wales coal industry. The most significant example of this consolidation was the expansion of the Cambrian Combine under the directorship of D. A. Thomas (later Lord Rhondda). Thomas had inherited mining interests from his father Samuel, who had commenced sinking operations at Cambrian Collieries in Clydach Vale in 1871. Following Samuel Thomas's death in 1879, D. A. Thomas expanded the business substantially, forming Cambrian Collieries Limited with a share capital of £600,000 in 1895.

Between 1907 and 1910, Thomas systematically absorbed a succession of local collieries through the Cambrian Trust Limited, acquiring controlling interests in the Glamorgan Coal Company in 1907, 67% of the Naval Colliery Company in 1908, and bringing Britannic Merthyr Coal Company and Penrhiwfer Collieries under his control by 1910. By 1910, the Cambrian Combine employed a total workforce of approximately 12,000 miners and produced almost 3 million tons of coal annually, making it one of the largest mining operations in Wales.

Large companies like the Cambrian Combine were able to rely on the support of the Monmouthshire and South Wales Coalowners Association (M&SWCA), which provided financial backing for individual companies to impose lock-outs as a disciplinary measure against workers who resisted wage reductions or changes to working conditions. The Naval Colliery Company, for example, was required to obtain the Association's consent before serving lock-out notices on the Ely Pit workmen, and its members were bound to subordinate their individual views to the Association's collective decisions. This organised power of capital contrasted with the more fragmented structure of the South Wales Miners' Federation (SWMF), which was a federation of autonomous districts rather than a centralised union, a form of organisation that often obstructed united action against the coalowners' offensive.

== September 1910: the Ely Pit dispute ==
Early logo of the South Wales Miners' Federation.

The immediate cause of the 1910 conflict arose when the Naval Colliery Company opened a new coal seam at the Ely Pit in Penygraig. The approximately 70 miners working the seam argued that the new Bute seam was more difficult and dangerous to work due to a substantial stone band running through it, making coal extraction both hazardous and less productive.

The Naval Colliery's wage structure was based on 1877 standard rates, with workers receiving 35 percent above these rates by 1910. After a test period to determine extraction rates, management claimed the miners were deliberately working slowly, while the miners disputed this assessment, citing the geological difficulties. When the company offered one shilling and ninepence per ton plus one penny for stone removal, the miners demanded two shillings and sixpence per ton, reflecting the dangerous working conditions.

When negotiations failed, D. A. Thomas imposed a lock-out on 1 September 1910, closing the entire Ely Pit to all 950 workers, not merely the 70 miners working the disputed seam. The Ely Pit miners responded by going on strike, and the Cambrian Combine brought in strikebreakers from outside the area.

=== Strikebreaker recruitment and protection ===
The employment of external strikebreakers became a central strategy for the Cambrian Combine. The company recruited approximately 60 replacement workers who continued operations at the Glamorgan Colliery in Llwynypia, the only pit that remained operational during the dispute. These strikebreakers were provided with enhanced protection, as employers in some disputes offered wage increases ranging from 25 to 50 per cent to encourage workers to cross picket lines.

The Chief Constable of Glamorgan had assembled 200 imported police in the Tonypandy area by 6 November, transforming the colliery "into a near fortress" with extensive police protection for strikebreakers. The protective infrastructure included baton charges and "fierce hand-to-hand fighting" when miners attempted mass picketing to prevent safety officials and replacement workers from entering the mines.

== October 1910: strike expansion ==
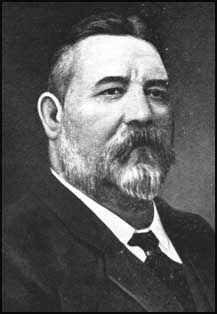
William Abraham (Mabon).

The miners established picket lines around the work site to prevent the employment of non-union labour. Attempts at conciliation were made through a conciliation board, with William Abraham (14 June 1842 – 14 May 1922), universally known by his bardic name Mabon, acting for the miners and F. L. Davis representing the owners. Although an agreed wage of 2s 3d per ton was negotiated, the Cambrian Combine workforce rejected this compromise, maintaining their demand for 2s 6d per ton to reflect the dangerous and difficult working conditions in the disputed seam.

On 1 November 1910, the South Wales Miners' Federation balloted the entire coalfield membership for strike action, resulting in all 12,000 men working for the Cambrian Combine going on strike. By winter 1910, approximately 30,000 miners were involved as the dispute spread to other collieries.

== November 1910: the riots ==
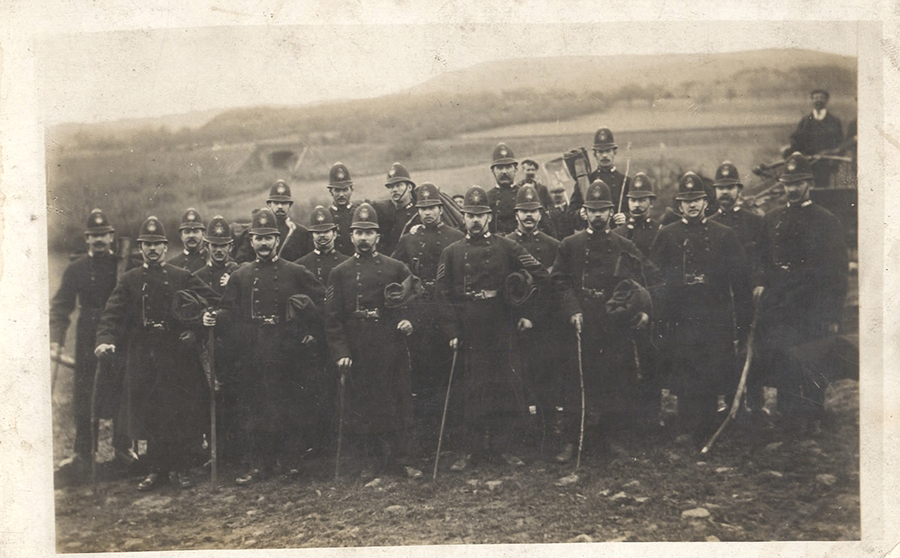
Police officers during the Tonypandy riots, 1910–11.

By November 1910, strikers had shut down all local pits except the Glamorgan Colliery at Llwynypia. On 7 November, strikers picketed the colliery to prevent strikebreakers from entering, resulting in violent clashes with police that led to Glamorgan's chief constable requesting military support.

Home Secretary Winston Churchill's response to the crisis demonstrated the complex decision-making process surrounding military deployment. At 3:30 AM on 8 November, Chief Constable Captain Lionel Lindsay had telegraphed for military assistance, receiving confirmation that 200 cavalry and two companies of infantry were being dispatched from Tidworth on Salisbury Plain. However, Churchill learned of this deployment only after the troops had departed and controversially ordered them stopped at Swindon.

Churchill held urgent conferences with Mr. Haldane (Secretary of State for War), General Ewart (Adjutant General), Sir Edward Troup, and Sir Edward Henry before deciding his course of action. At 1:30 PM on 8 November, he telegraphed the Chief Constable: "We are holding back the soldiers for the present and sending only police." Instead, Churchill dispatched 200 Metropolitan Police officers, who did not arrive until 10:30 PM—just as the major rioting in Tonypandy was concluding.

During the evening of 8 November, what Evans termed "the Sack of Tonypandy" saw properties systematically damaged, with shops attacked and looting occurring. The rioting lasted several hours until Metropolitan Police arrived around 10:30 p.m. Evans recorded that over 500 strikers were injured, with police casualties exceeding 50 per cent of those engaged—38 out of approximately 70–80 officers involved in the November 7th conflicts alone. Of the 18 mounted police, 16 required medical treatment for injuries sustained during the riots.

The sole fatality was Samuel Rhys of Partridge Road, Tonypandy, who died three days after the Llwynypia confrontation. At the inquest held at Porth on 15 December, medical evidence showed he had suffered three separate head injuries, but the jury concluded: "That we agree that Samuel Rays [sic] died from injuries he received on November 8th caused by some blunt instrument. The evidence is not sufficiently clear to us how he received those injuries."

The use of firearms during the riots remains disputed. While official records state no shots were fired by military forces, persistent local accounts claimed troops fired on miners, contributing to lasting Welsh resentment towards Churchill. Thirteen miners were arrested and received sentences ranging from two to six weeks.

=== The 21 November riots ===
A further confrontation occurred on the evening of 21 November 1910, when strikers attempted to prevent the operation of essential services at the collieries. Evans described these as "more sustained, if not also more desperate, than on any other occasion since the beginning of the strike." The violence began at Tonypandy railway station, where strikers had been informed that strikebreakers were arriving by train from Pontypridd.

When the 8:30 p.m. train arrived, intense fighting broke out between strikers and police. The conflict spread simultaneously to Penygraig, where "fierce and sustained street fighting" continued for over four hours. General Macready immediately dispatched 50 Metropolitan Police from Pontypridd and ordered Major Freeth to proceed from Llwynypia to Penygraig with half a company of Lancashire Fusiliers. Additional troops, including the West Riding Regiment and 18th Royal Hussars, were rushed to the scene by both rail and road.

The official casualty list recorded 50 police officers injured in the November 21st riots, with Evans noting that "most of the police engaged in the suppression of the riot were struck with stones or some other missile." The violence was eventually suppressed without direct military intervention, though troops remained positioned throughout the area.

== December 1910 – July 1911: the long strike ==
=== Community hardship and women's role ===
Following the November riots, the Cambrian Combine strike continued through the winter months of 1910–11, causing significant hardship for mining families. Evans recorded that strikers received 10s per week in strike pay, supplemented by 1d per child under 12, free coal, free school meals for children, extended credit from tradesmen, and non-payment of rents and rates, yet many wants remained unsatisfied. With approximately 12,000 miners without wages for nearly a year, the burden of survival fell heavily on miners' wives and families.

=== Religious and social responses ===
The strike occurred during a period when Welsh nonconformist chapels wielded considerable influence in industrial communities. By 1910, nonconformist bodies numbered 550,000 members compared to 193,000 in the established Church of England, making Wales predominantly a nonconformist country. The chapels had traditionally provided moral leadership and social cohesion in Welsh industrial areas, with their ministers having "considerable influence within working class networks."

However, the violence and civil unrest challenged this religious authority. The social disruption revealed what historian Dai Smith described as "a community fracture inimical to the self-image cherished by Liberal and Nonconformist Edwardian Wales." The strikes exposed tensions within the broader nonconformist community that had traditionally provided stability in Welsh mining areas, with the chapels having formed "almost a kind of unofficial established religion" in the industrial valleys.

Women played an active role in the conflict, with local newspapers reporting that "Women joined with the men in the unequal combat" during confrontations with police. The community solidarity extended to the December 1910 trials, where up to 10,000 miners and their families marched the five miles to court each day for six days to support the thirteen arrested miners.

The military presence remained in the area throughout this period, with troops ensuring that prosecutions of rioters and strike leaders proceeded in Pontypridd during 1911.

In December 1910, the trial of the thirteen arrested miners occupied six days and was supported by demonstrations of up to 10,000 men, who were refused entry to the town. Parliamentary debates during February and March 1911 addressed the ongoing strike and the government's use of military forces, with supplementary funding of £15,000 requested for Metropolitan Police expenses.

In late March 1911, disturbances occurred in Blaenclydach during which shop premises were damaged and looted; the incidents were reported by the Rhondda Leader the following month as the "Blaenclydach Terror". The prolonged dispute caused considerable hardship for mining families throughout the South Wales valleys.

== August 1911: resolution ==
The Cambrian Combine strike finally concluded in August 1911 after nearly a year of industrial action. The miners, facing economic hardship, were compelled to accept the original wage offer of 2s 3d per ton that had been negotiated by Mabon prior to the strike's commencement. Workers began returning to the pits sporadically in early September 1911, having failed to achieve their original wage demands and returning on terms that were arguably worse than before the dispute began.

The contrast between the strike's beginning and end was stark. Evans observed that the 17 August 1911 meeting at the mid-Rhondda Grounds presented a dramatically different scene from the defiant gathering of 18 September 1910: "Then the demeanour of the thousands of miners who assembled in front of the platform was one of vociferous defiance of their employers and one of whole-hearted determination to fight the issues to a triumphant end; now their demeanour was one of sullen dejection, and of a suppressed anger against those whom they considered responsible for their defeat, and of a greatly weakened, if not lost, faith in the power of orthodox trades unionism to redress wrongs."

By September 1911, only 80 per cent of the original strikers had obtained re-employment, leaving approximately 2,400 men permanently displaced. The strike's conclusion marked a significant defeat for the miners after the hardship endured during the winter months.

=== Aftermath for displaced miners ===
The military occupation ensured that trials of strike leaders would take place successfully in Pontypridd during 1911, contributing to the miners' defeat. Thirteen miners from Gilfach Goch were prosecuted for their involvement, receiving custodial terms of two to six weeks, whilst others were discharged or fined. The prosecutions, combined with the presence of troops, effectively prevented further strike action and contributed to the "marginalisation of the liberal wing of the trade union movement."

The defeat marked the downfall of Mabon and traditional conciliation-based leadership, whilst simultaneously contributing to demands for a national minimum wage, which Parliament passed a year later. However, the immediate aftermath left many mining families in difficult circumstances, with the 2,400 permanently displaced miners facing uncertain futures in an industry that had demonstrated its willingness to use replacement workers and military force against organised labour.

=== Economic costs ===
The financial toll of the strike was considerable. Evans calculated that by September 1911, the Cambrian Combine workmen had lost nearly £800,000 in wages, while accumulated debts exceeded £90,000 based on an estimated debt accumulation rate of 4 shillings and 6 pence per week per person receiving strike pay. The South Wales Miners' Federation paid out over £300,000 during the 20-month period ending September 1911, with the Cambrian Combine strikers receiving approximately £200,000, averaging over £22 per strike member in benefits.

The Rhondda supplied a third of all coal extracted in the United Kingdom, and the Cambrian Combine supplied fifty per cent of the Rhondda's total output. Local businesses suffered severe disruption, with striking miners attacking shops that had placed families on credit blacklists, preventing them from purchasing adequate food supplies. The prolonged nature of the dispute meant that local commerce faced nearly a year of reduced purchasing power from the 12,000–30,000 miners and their families who were without wages.

The financial burden extended beyond direct costs. Federation members were levied £1 each during the 13 months ending September 1911 to support the strikes, but response was so inadequate that the Executive Council was forced to instruct lodges to pay outstanding strike levies from their local funds. Evans noted that the strike cost represented funds "which it had taken a 13 years' chequered effort to accumulate," effectively bankrupting the organisation's reserves.

=== Political and historical significance ===
The strike's failure created a crisis in Welsh labour leadership. Evans observed that the defeat exposed "the greatest possible defeat" the Federation had encountered, fundamentally undermining confidence in traditional trade union methods. The prolonged dispute revealed deep tensions between established leaders like Mabon and emerging socialist factions who advocated more militant approaches.

The strike demonstrated what Evans characterised as "a struggle for supremacy in leadership and in policy more prolonged and embittered than in any previous struggle in the history of organised labour in the coalfield." The traditional conciliation-based approach of the older leadership was discredited, creating space for the rise of more radical voices who would later author The Miners' Next Step and advocate for direct industrial action.

Welsh historian Dai Smith has argued that the strike represented a pivotal moment in Welsh political development, marking "the passing away within a decade of the Wales of David Lloyd George" and ushering in "the Wales of Aneurin Bevan, Churchill's profoundest opponent." Smith contends that the Cambrian strike "exposed the myth of State neutrality asserted by Churchill," fundamentally altering the relationship between government and organised labour. Modern historiographical analysis has emphasised the strike's role in the broader Great Unrest period, with scholars noting its significance as both a catalyst and exemplar of the intense labour militancy that characterised British industrial relations between 1910–1914.

The influence of syndicalist activists organised in the Unofficial Reform Committee during the strike has been identified as having nurtured militant direct action that would later manifest in The Miners' Next Step (1912). The document, written by a group of young socialists from the Rhondda led by Noah Ablett, was described by historian Bob Holton as one of the high points of syndicalist organising in the UK. It emerged from the Cambrian Combine experience, rejecting the moderate policies of the South Wales Miners Federation under Mabon and advocating for direct industrial action over parliamentary politics. Ablett, who had been influenced by Daniel De Leon and Marxist theory during his time at Ruskin College, led unofficial classes that challenged traditional trade union approaches.

The defeat contributed to the eventual ousting of Mabon from Federation leadership and the rise of more radical voices who would dominate Welsh labour politics through the interwar period. The strike's legacy extended beyond labour relations to influence government policy on industrial disputes. Evans observed that the events provided important "lessons" for future military deployment in civilian disturbances, with the government learning from what he termed "the lessons of Tonypandy" about the complex relationship between civil and military authority during industrial conflicts. The controversy over Churchill's handling of the crisis would continue to influence his political reputation, particularly in Wales, for decades.

== Bibliography ==
- Arnot, R. Page (1967). South Wales Miners: A History of the South Wales Miners' Federation (1898–1914). London: Allen & Unwin.
- Day, Graham (2002). Making Sense of Wales: A Sociological Perspective. Cardiff: University of Wales Press. ISBN 978-0-7083-1771-6.
- Evans, D.E. (1911). Labour Strife in the South Wales Coalfield 1910–1911. Cardiff: Educational Publishing Co.
- Herbert, Trevor (1988). Herbert, Trevor (ed.). Wales 1880–1914: Welsh History and Its Sources. Cardiff: University of Wales Press. ISBN 0-7083-0967-4.
- Holton, Bob (1976). British Syndicalism 1900–1914. London: Merlin Press. ISBN 978-0-85036-211-4.
- Lewis, E.D. (1959). The Rhondda Valleys. London: Phoenix House.
- Smith, Dai (1993). Aneurin Bevan and the World of South Wales. Cardiff: University of Wales Press. ISBN 978-0-7083-1216-2.
