= Croespenmaen =

Village in Caerphilly, Wales

Coordinates: 51.6799°N 3.1644°W

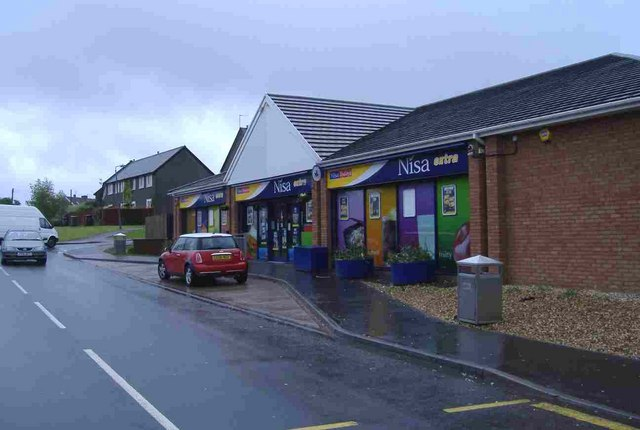
The Nisa in Croespenmaen in 2007

Croespenmaen is a locality near Crumlin, Caerphilly, Wales. The nearby Croespenmaen Industrial Estate is the site of Unilever's Pot Noodle factory, which became the topic of a 2006 advertising campaign, showing fictitious Pot Noodle mines in Wales. The factory typically produces 155 million pots annually. Croespenmaen is also the site of the Brace's Bakery factory.
