= Clydach Vale =

Village in Rhondda Cynon Taf, Wales

Coordinates: 51.626758°N 3.471919°W

Clydach Vale: Welsh: Cwmclydach
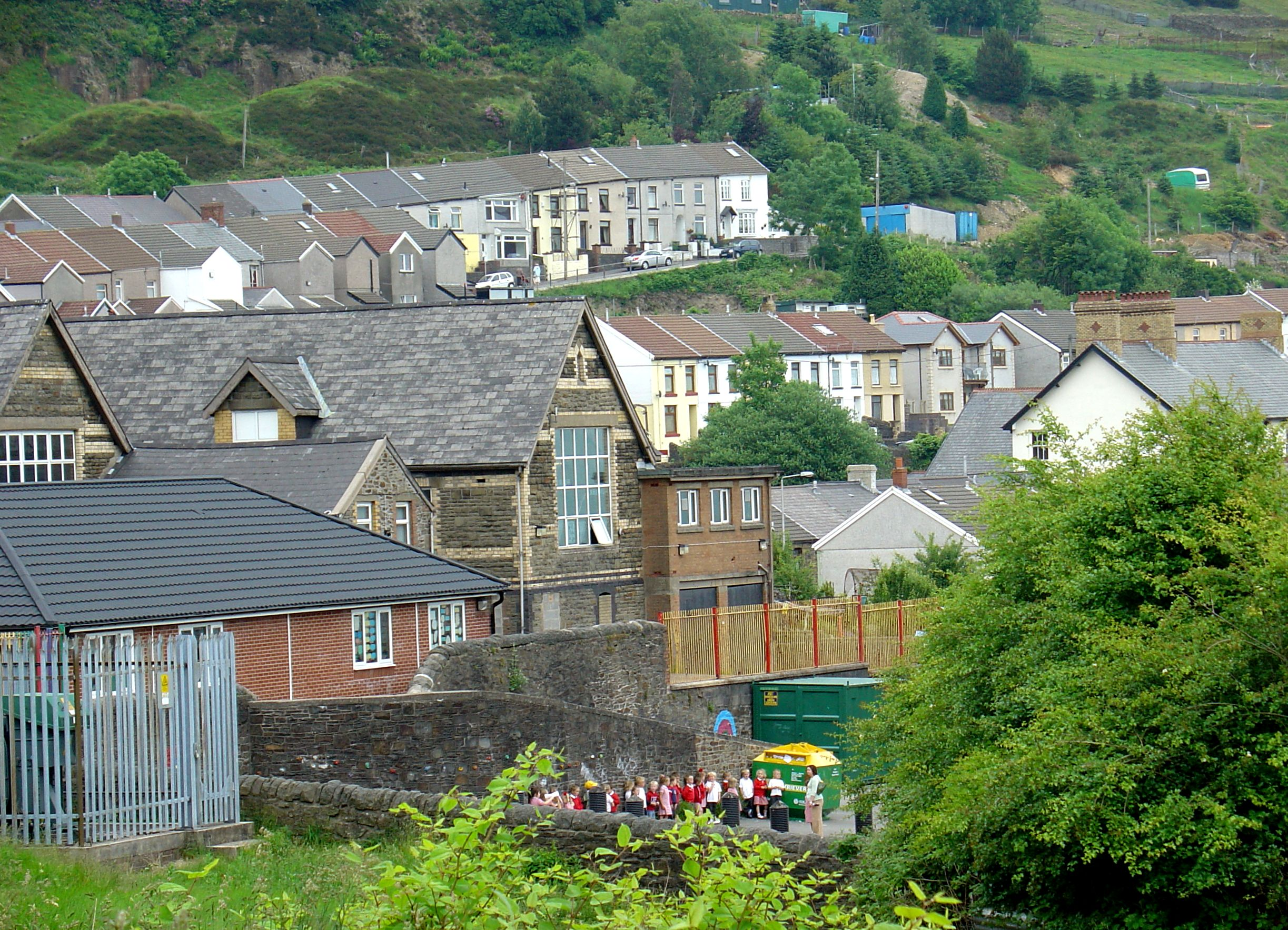
- A view of Clydach Vale—school in foreground

- Location within Rhondda Cynon Taf
- Population: 2,799 2011
- OS grid reference: SS982930
- Community: Cwm Clydach
- Principal area: Rhondda Cynon Taf
- Preserved county: Mid Glamorgan
- Country: Wales
- Sovereign state: United Kingdom
- Post town: TONYPANDY
- Postcode district: CF40
- Dialling code: 01443
- Police: South Wales
- Fire: South Wales
- Ambulance: Welsh
- UK Parliament: Rhondda
- Senedd Cymru – Welsh Parliament: Rhondda

Clydach Vale (Welsh: Cwmclydach and adjoining Blaenclydach) is a village in the community of Cwm Clydach, northwest of Tonypandy in the county borough of Rhondda Cynon Taf, within the Rhondda Valley, Wales. It is named for its situation on the Nant Clydach, a tributary of the River Rhondda. The village is deemed part of the Tonypandy built-up area by the Office for National Statistics and comes under the Tonypandy post town.

== Integration of villages ==
Before the coming of industrialisation, Clydach Vale was a sparsely populated agricultural area. Records show that in the seventeenth century the area was named Dyffryn Clydach (Clydach Vale), and was divided into two areas, Cwmclydach and Blaenclydach. Those two localities are today very much integrated. The Cwmclydach Community Partnership is made up of groups from both villages (and the wider community), plus the Clydach Vale Countryside Park and Mountain Forestry.

== History ==
In the 1840s coal mining began in the valley, but this was on a small scale and no pits were sunk at this time. Towards the end of the century there was a marked increase in mining activity, several collieries being opened, including Lefel-Y-Bush (1863), Blaenclydach (1863), Cwmclydach (1864) and Clydach Vale Collieries Nos. 1, 2 and 3.

=== Industrial conflict ===
The Clydach Vale collieries would later become synonymous with worker activism within the South Wales coalfield. Opened in 1872, the Clydach Vale colliery No. 1 was originally sunk by Osbourne Riches and Samuel Thomas and, by 1894, was served by the Taff Vale Railway. Following the death of Thomas in 1879, his sons became managing partners and, in 1895, formed Cambrian Colleries Ltd. The Cambrian Collieries were a focus for disputation between active trade unions such as the South Wales Miners' Federation and the Cambrian Combine, a business network of mining companies, formed to regulate prices and wages in south Wales. A bitter clash between them resulted in the 1910 Tonypandy Riot.

=== Colliery disasters ===
On 10 March 1905, an explosion occurred at the Cambrian Colliery No.1. The explosion was heard for miles around the valleys and resulted in the loss of 33 lives and serious injury to 14 others. The accident happened between the day and night shifts, otherwise the death toll would have been far higher.

On 25 November 1941, seven men were killed and 53 were injured when a trolley transporting miners down a sharply sloping shaft ran out of control. The incident happened at the 'Gorky' drift mine, with ninety men and boys taking the spake, an open-sided trolley fitted with cross planks for seating and a central overhead handrail as a holding point, down to the workings 525 yards below. The surface engineman suffered a temporary blackout and the manual brake was disengaged, causing the spake to quickly build up speed. Most of the injuries and fatalities were to miners who leapt from the spake and were thrown back under the trolley due to the narrowness of the drift shaft.

On 17 May 1965, a third major accident occurred at the Cambrian Colliery. An explosion caused by firedamp, after poor ventilation allowed a build-up of flammable gas, killed 31 miners. The ignition point was later identified as an electric arc on an open switch-panel which was being worked on. This was the last major mining disaster in South Wales history.

=== 1910 flood disaster ===
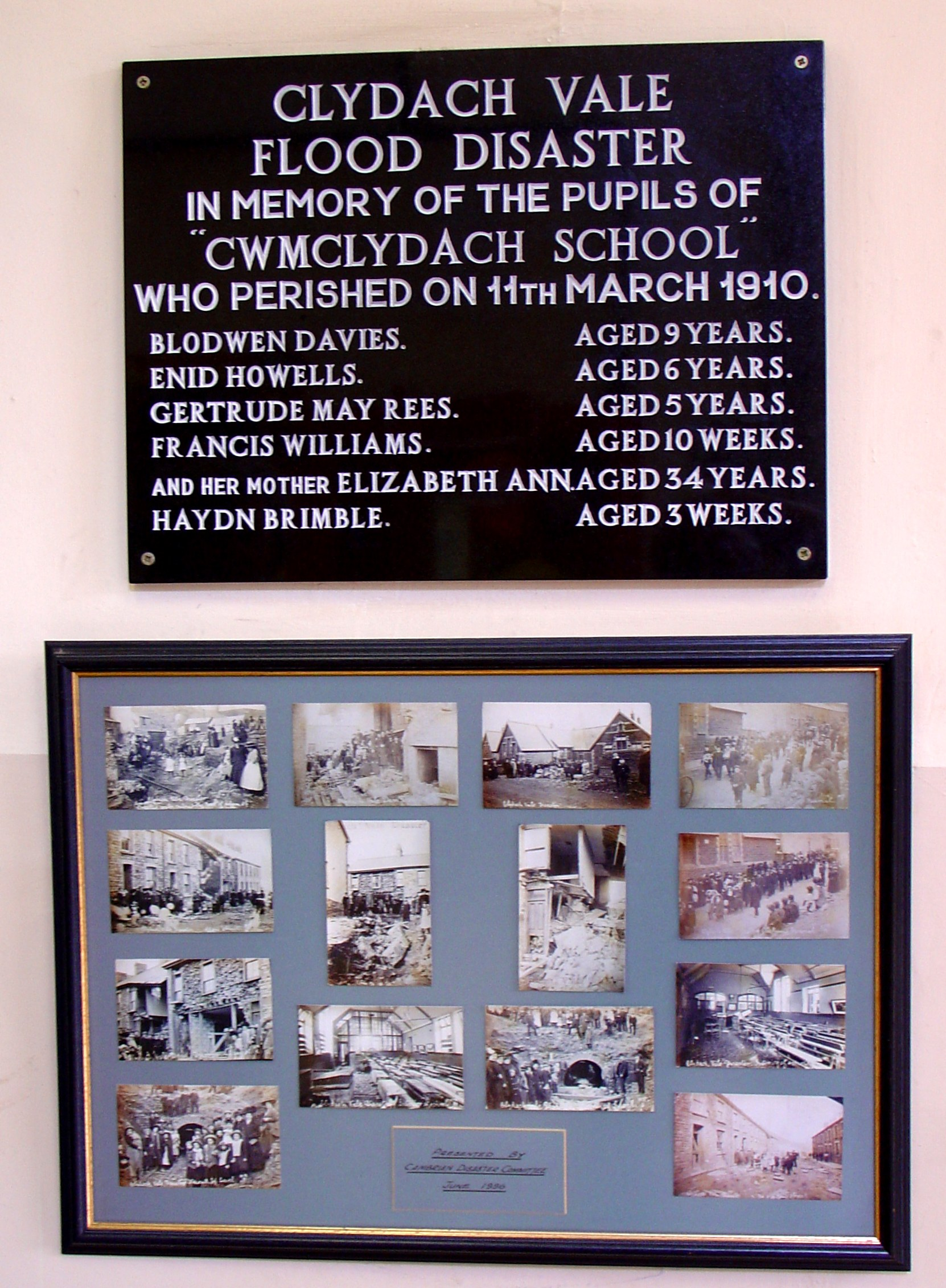
Commemorative plaque and photo montage at Clydach Vale School

At about 4.00 p.m. on Friday 11 March 1910, the lives of one adult and five children were lost when pent-up water from an abandoned coal mine burst through into the village.

The mountainside seemed to give way, 'as though from a volcanic eruption' and a torrent of water together with huge amounts of earth, boulders and other debris swept down the hillside. Directly in the path of this torrent lay Adams Terrace and, according to contemporary newspaper reports, the first house it encountered 'was in a moment completely wrecked like a pack of cards' and its occupants Mrs. Elizabeth Ann Williams and her ten-week-old baby girl perished.

A three-week-old baby boy also died. The newspaper went on to state that, 'Altogether eleven houses and a shoemaker's shop were wrecked, one being completely washed away'.

Rushing down to the valley floor, the torrent inundated the Clydach Vale School and trapped hundreds of children. The time coincided with the homecoming of many miners at the ending of a shift and an immediate rescue effort by them and the school's staff saved all but three of over 950 children. In particular, headmaster Robert Ralph Williams displayed extraordinary bravery in battling the flood and saving many children, for which he was later awarded the Albert Medal.

A brass wall plaque was placed in the school in recognition of the discipline and heroism of the staff in organising the rescue. In preparation for the 2010 centenary of the disaster, another plaque, with names of the dead, was installed at the school together with a montage of photographs showing the aftermath of the flood.

== Governance ==
The electoral ward of Cwm Clydach is coterminous with the boundaries of the community. There is no community council for Cwm Clydach. The ward elects a county councillor to Rhondda Cynon Taf County Borough Council. With the exception of 1999-2004 (when it was represented by Plaid Cymru) it has been represented by the Labour Party. Rhondda Cynon Taf County Borough Council had its main offices in the community, at The Pavilions on the Cambrian Industrial Park from 1996 until early 2024.

== Cwmclydach Countryside Park and mountain forestry ==
Clydach Vale Countryside Park lies between Cwmclydach's two lakes and is a haven for birds, flowers and butterflies. Two main routes are available for walkers and cyclists, with several access routes on to the surrounding mountains.

== Sport ==
Clydach Vale is home to football team Cambrian & Clydach Vale B. & G.C, who play in the Cymru South. The village also has a rugby union club.

== Notable people ==
See Category:People from Clydach Vale

- Lewis Davies, librarian and philanthropist
- Rhys Davies, novelist, born at 6 Clydach Road, Blaenclydach
- Tommy Farr, heavyweight boxing champion
- Donald Houston, stage, film and TV actor
- Glyn Houston, film and TV actor
- Dr David Jenkins CBE, a former Librarian of the National Library of Wales, born in adjoining Blaenclydach
- Lewis Jones, political activist, writer of Cwmardy and We Live
- Tom Norris, Welsh heavyweight boxing champion
- Liam Williams, British and Commonwealth super-welterweight boxing champion

== Images of Clydach Vale ==
Impacts on landscape and society of a century of coal mining are not fully obliterated, though surrounding slagheaps have been greened by environmental programmes. Former miners' cottages are renovated as low-cost housing for a new generation of young families.

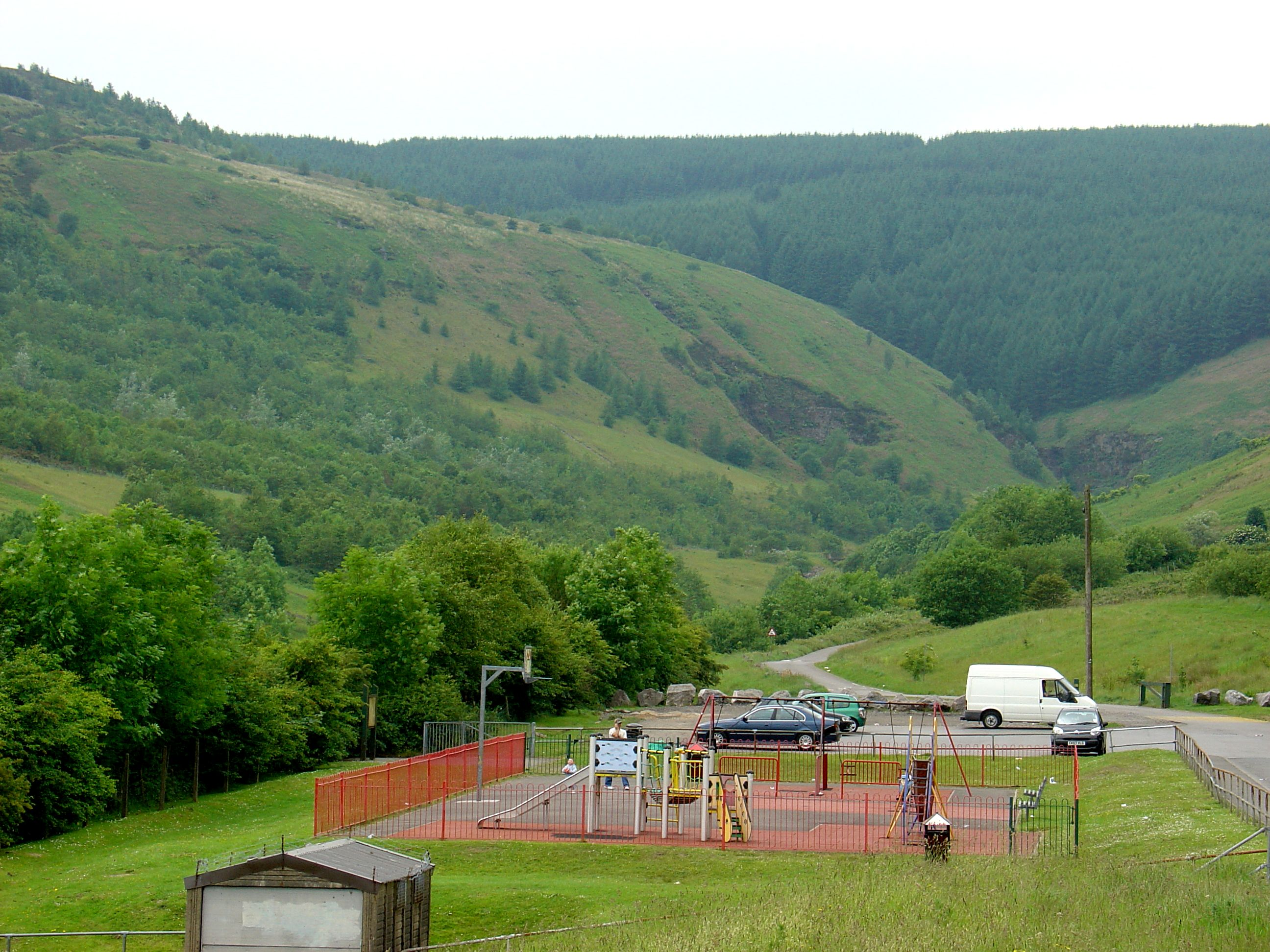
The head of the vale

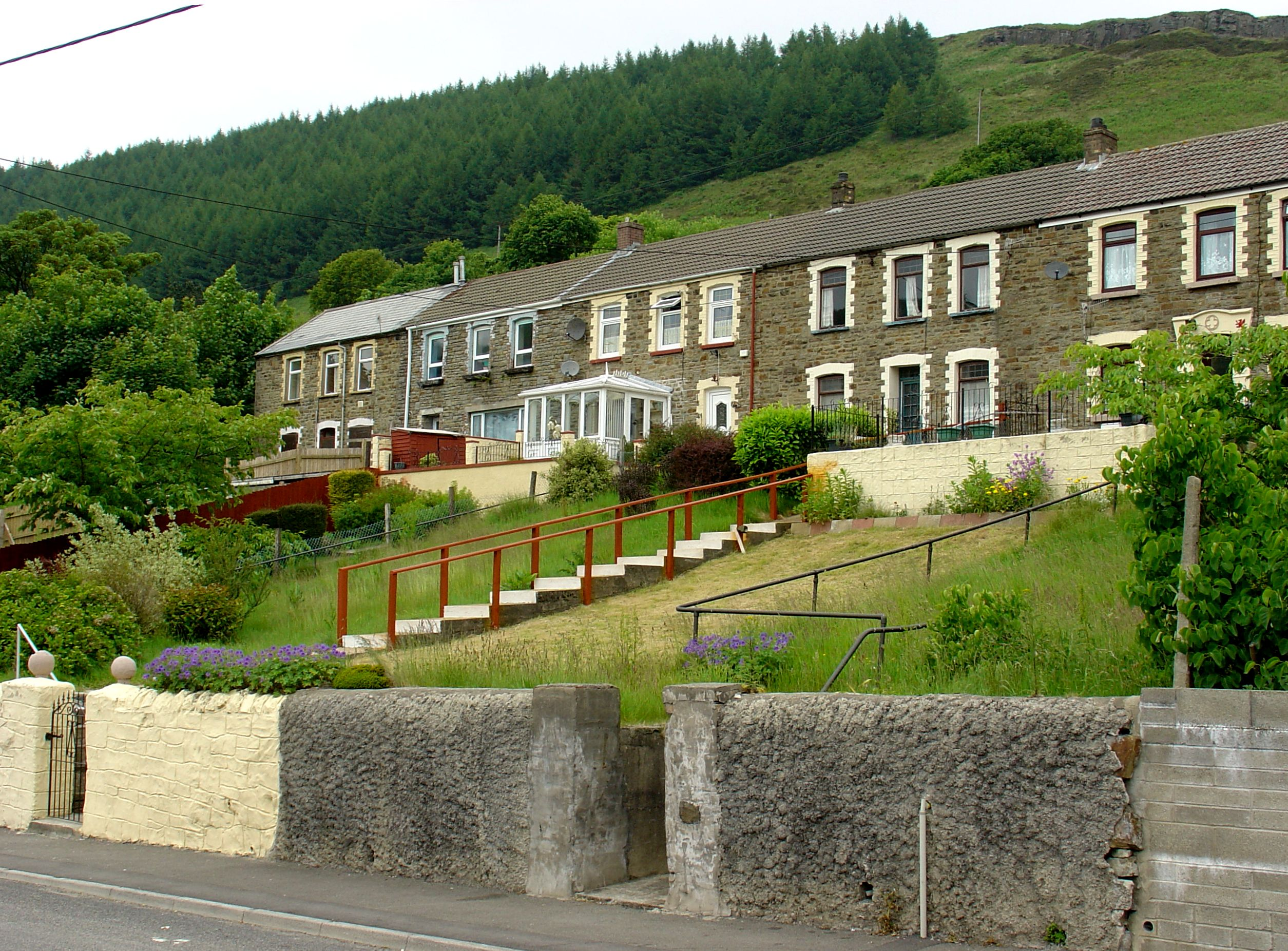
Terraced housing

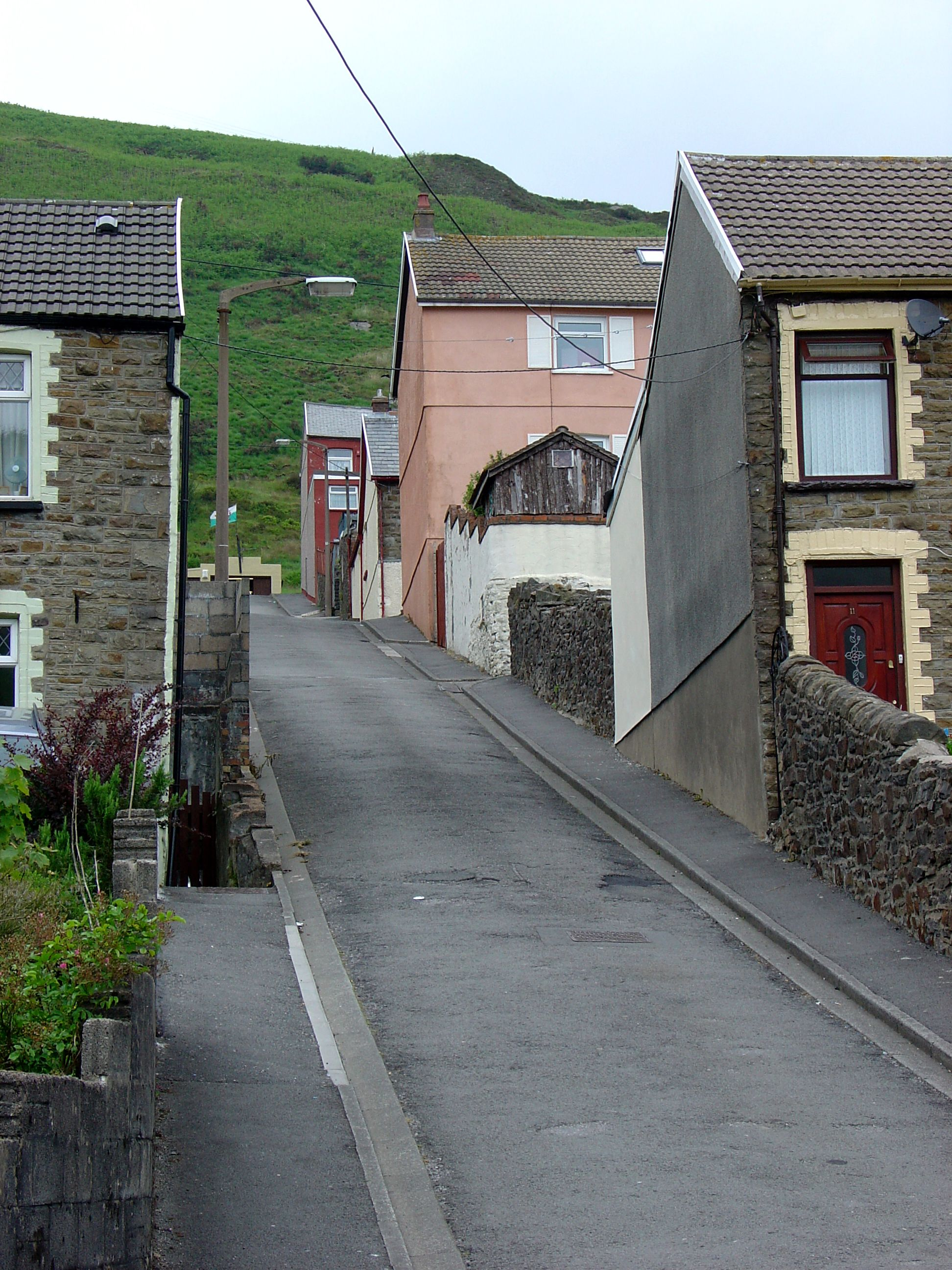
A typical steep hill

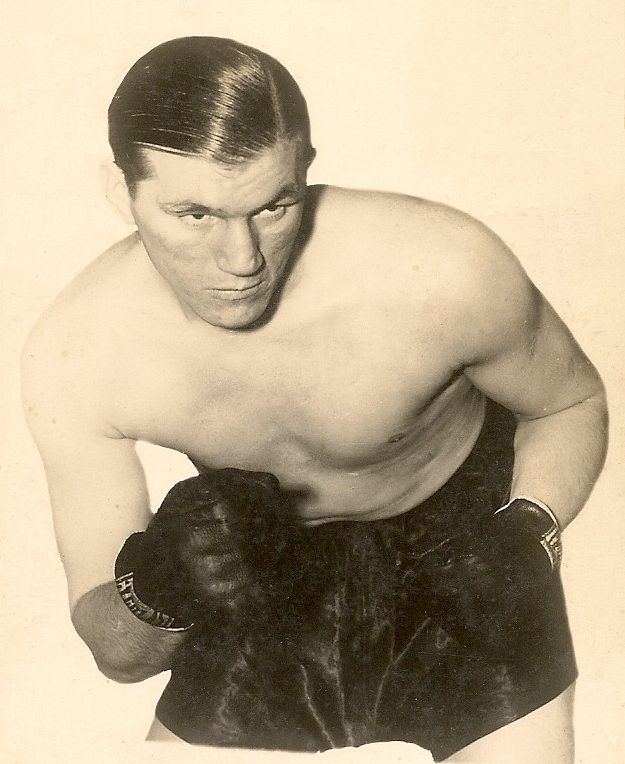
Tommy Farr, famous son

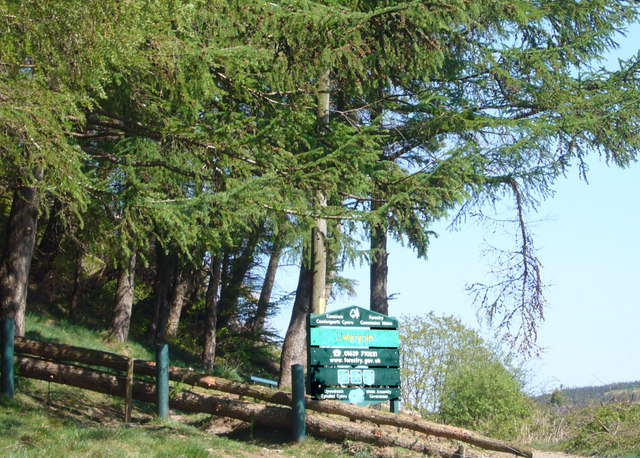
Llwynypia Forest, Blaenclydach
