= Lewis Jones (writer) =

Welsh writer and political activist (1897–1939)

- Born: 28 December 1897 Clydach Vale, Rhondda, Wales
- Died: 27 January 1939 (aged 41)
- Resting place: Trealaw, Rhondda, Wales
- Occupation: Novelist, political activist, trade unionist
- Period: 1930s
- Genre: Proletarian literature, social realism
- Subject: Mining communities, working-class struggle, socialism
- Notable works: Cwmardy (1937); We Live (1939)

Lewis Jones (28 December 1897 – 27 January 1939) was a Welsh writer and Communist political activist from Clydach Vale in the Rhondda Valley, South Wales. A coal miner who became a trade union official, Jones emerged as a prominent figure in the Communist Party of Great Britain and served as Welsh organiser for the National Unemployed Workers' Movement.

Jones is best known for his two novels, Cwmardy (1937) and We Live (1939), which are regarded as classics of proletarian literature for their vivid portrayal of working-class life and political struggle in the South Wales coalfield during the interwar period. He died in 1939 at age 41, shortly after completing his second novel while campaigning for the Second Spanish Republic.

== Early life and education ==
Jones holds a significant position in the history of left-wing politics in Britain and among socialist writers. Following the pattern of many young activists of his generation, he attended the Central Labour College in London from 1923 to 1925, where he joined the Communist Party of Great Britain.

== Trade union activities ==
During the 1926 General Strike, Jones was imprisoned for three months in Swansea Prison for his trade union activities in the Nottinghamshire coalfield.

Returning to the mines, Jones became chairman and subsequently checkweighman of the Cambrian Lodge of the South Wales Miners Federation. While often considered subordinate to the position of Lodge Chairman, the checkweighman role was crucial during periods of industrial unrest, protecting miners against employers who used piece work rules to reduce wages. In this capacity, Jones frequently clashed with management.

Jones played a central role in the stay-down strikes of late 1935, a wave of underground strikes that swept through South Wales collieries. During these strikes, workforces remained underground until non-unionists and company union members (known as 'non-pols') were removed from the pits. While largely spontaneous, the strikes were semi-organised and represented a dramatic assertion of miners' workplace control. At some pits, notably the company-union dominated Taff Merthyr, both unions coexisted after the South Wales Miners Federation secured the right to a free ballot in 1934. Jones later dramatised these events in his novel We Live, capturing both the disciplined collective action of the miners and their determination to maintain solidarity despite management pressure.

== Political activism ==
In 1929, Jones resigned from mining, refusing to work alongside 'scab' (non-unionised) labour. He remained unemployed for the rest of his life, though he was continually engaged in political activities. While extremely popular among rank-and-file Party members, his association with "Hornerism", his turbulent private life, and his distrust of the cult of personality, he was sent home from the Soviet Union for refusing to participate in a standing ovation for Joseph Stalin resulted in repeated suspensions and disciplinary actions by the Party. As Welsh organiser for the National Unemployed Workers Movement, widely regarded as a Communist front, Jones led the 1932, 1934, and 1936 hunger marches to London. In 1936, he was elected as one of two Communist members to Glamorgan County Council. In South Wales during this period, his Communist Party membership enhanced rather than hindered his reputation as a political activist and leader.

== Death ==
Jones died on 27 January 1939 after addressing over 30 meetings that day in support of the republican cause in the Spanish Civil War. He is buried in Trealaw Cemetery, Trealaw.

== Literary works ==
Literary scholar Shintaro Kono characterises Jones not primarily as a novelist but as an 'organic intellectual' who saw himself as unified with his people, for whom writing constituted only one aspect of a comprehensive political life. His novels are fictionalised accounts of his own life, the history of his valley, and the people among whom he worked and lived. Jones described his work as a 'novelised' version of working-class history, which he believed could be expressed 'more truthfully and vividly' through fiction 'than by any amount of statistical and historical research'.

Jones's novels provide a detailed portrayal of Welsh mining community life during his era, demonstrating awareness of the masculinity crisis that mass unemployment inflicted on these communities. His depiction of workers struggling against employers unflinchingly acknowledges both defeat and victory. Literary scholars have identified his novels as both unconventional Bildungsromane and "anti-initiation novels" that reject the conventional pattern of protagonists abandoning their working-class communities for individual advancement. Instead, the novels chronicle the collective development of the mining community of Cwmardy itself.

== Bibliography ==
- Davies, John; Jenkins, Nigel (2008). The Welsh Academy Encyclopaedia of Wales. Cardiff: University of Wales Press. ISBN 978-0-7083-1953-6.
- Hopkins, K.S. (1975). Rhondda Past and Future. Ferndale: Rhondda Borough Council.
- Kono, Shintaro (2019). "Lewis Jones and the Making of Welsh 'Identity'". In Ferrall, Charles; McNeill, Dougal (eds.). British Literature in Transition, 1920–1940: Futility and Anarchy. Cambridge: Cambridge University Press. pp. 259–274.
- Smith, David (1982). Lewis Jones. Writers of Wales. Cardiff: University of Wales Press. ISBN 978-0-7083-0830-1.
