= Dai Smith (historian) =

Welsh historian

Dai Smith CBE FLSW
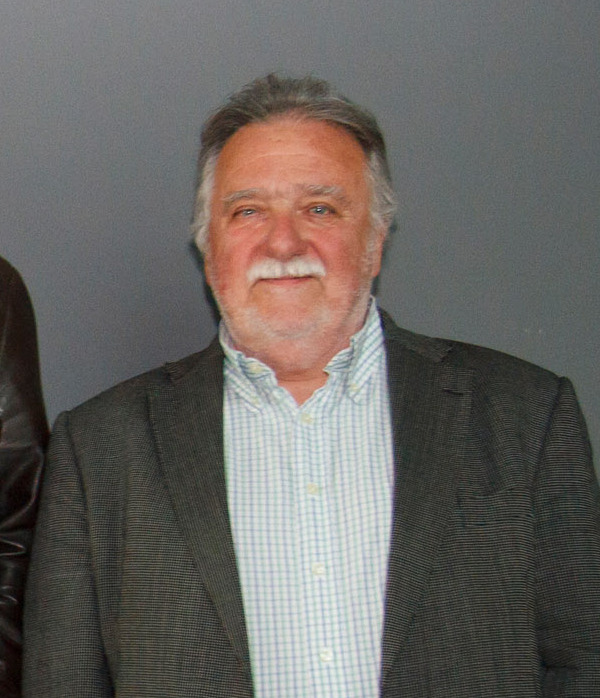
- Portrait of Smith, 2012
- Born: David Burton Smith; 1945 (age 80–81); Tonypandy, Glamorgan, Wales, United Kingdom
- Occupation: Historian
- Children: Owen Smith

Academic work
- Discipline: History
- Sub-discipline: Cultural history of Wales
- Institutions: University of Wales; BBC Radio Wales; University of Glamorgan

David Burton "Dai" Smith CBE FLSW (born 1945) is a Welsh academic, cultural historian, author, and former BBC programme editor and broadcaster. He was chair of the Arts Council of Wales between 2007 and 2016.

Smith was born in the Rhondda. He was educated at Porth County and Barry Grammar School, before studying history and literature at Balliol College, Oxford, and later undertook further studies at Columbia University, New York, and the University of Wales, Swansea. Between 1969 and 1993, he was a lecturer in history in the universities of Lancaster, Swansea, and Cardiff. He was appointed as Professor in the History of Wales at the University of Wales in Cardiff in 1985, holding the post until 1992. He has also held visiting lectureships at universities in Denmark, England, France, Germany, Holland, Ireland and Spain.

In 1993, he joined the BBC as editor of Radio Wales, and in 1994 was appointed as Head of Broadcast (English Language). He was responsible for commissioning programmes on the arts and in drama, and has also presented award-winning documentaries on the people and culture of south Wales.

In 2000, Smith was appointed pro-vice-chancellor at the University of Glamorgan, where he was responsible for developing the university's contributions to the community. He left the post in 2005 to become the Raymond Williams Chair in the Cultural History of Wales at Swansea University. In 2007, he was appointed Chair of the Arts Council of Wales, a post to which he was reappointed twice and held until 2016.

His publications have included The Fed (1980), a history of South Wales miners written with Hywel Francis; Fields of Praise (1986), a history of rugby union in Wales co-authored with Gareth Williams; Wales: A Question for History (1988); Aneurin Bevan and the World of South Wales (1993); the authorised biography Raymond Williams: A Warrior’s Tale (2008); and In the Frame: Memory in Society 1910-2010 (2010). He has also edited the Welsh Assembly Government’s Library of Wales for classic works written in English from or about Wales.

His son is Owen Smith, MP.

In 2011, Smith was elected a Fellow of the Learned Society of Wales. Smith was appointed Commander of the Order of the British Empire (CBE) in the 2017 New Year Honours for services to culture and the arts in Wales.
