= Lievesley =

Lievesley is a surname. Notable people with the surname include:

- Denise Lievesley, British social statistician
- Joe Lievesley (1883–1941), English footballer
- Leslie Lievesley (1911–1949), English footballer and manager
- Wilfred Lievesley (1902–1979), English footballer
