= Staveley, Derbyshire =

Town in Derbyshire, England

Coordinates: 53.2694°N 1.3484°W

Staveley
- Civil parish
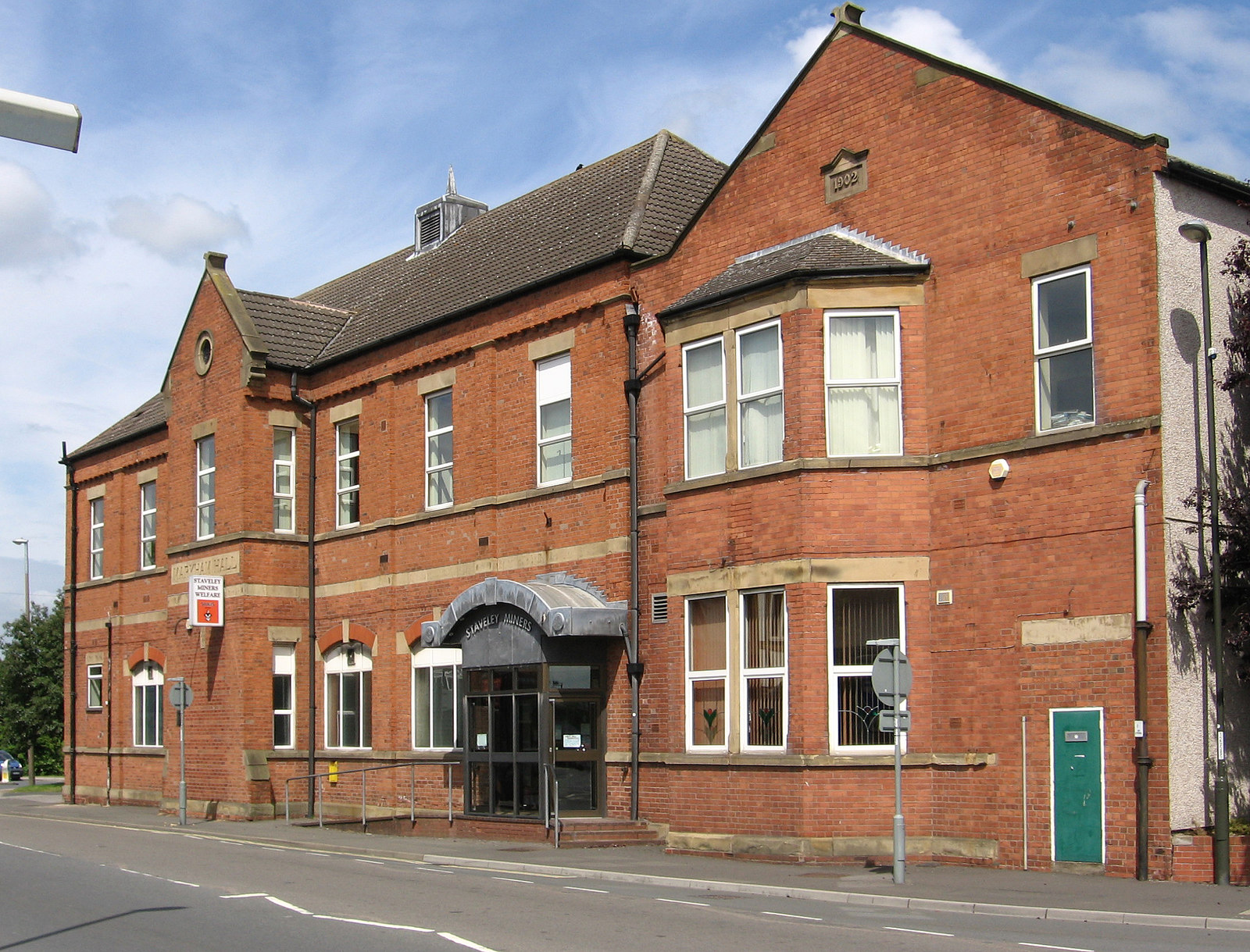
- Staveley Miners' Welfare

- Location within Derbyshire
- Interactive map of Staveley
- Population: 18,247 (including Barrow Hill, Beighton Fields, Mastin Moor and Poolsbrook, civil parish, 2011)
- OS grid reference: SK434749
- District: Chesterfield
- Shire county: Derbyshire
- Region: East Midlands
- Country: England
- Sovereign state: United Kingdom
- Post town: CHESTERFIELD
- Postcode district: S43
- Dialling code: 01246
- Police: Derbyshire
- Fire: Derbyshire
- Ambulance: East Midlands
- UK Parliament: Chesterfield; North East Derbyshire

Staveley is a town and civil parish in the Borough of Chesterfield, Derbyshire, England, along the banks of the River Rother (5 miles) northeast of Chesterfield, (5 miles) west of Clowne, (5 miles) northwest of Bolsover, (11 miles) southwest of Worksop and (13 miles) southeast of Sheffield.

== History ==
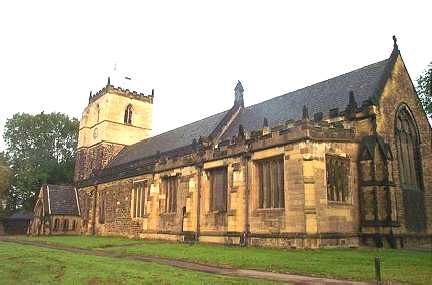
St John The Baptist Church, the parish church of Staveley

The name Staveley derives from the Old English stæflēah meaning 'stave' or 'staff wood or clearing'.

Staveley was formerly a mining town with several large coal mines in and around the area, the closest being Ireland Pit (Ireland Colliery Brass Band is named after the colliery). However, the pit has closed, along with the others in the area.

Staveley Miners Welfare on Market Street was built in 1893 as an indoor market hall by Charles Paxton Markham, for a time owner of Markham & Co. At that time, it was called Markham Hall in memory of his father. Markham played a large role in the industrial development of the area around Staveley. Through his company Markham & Co. and its successor Staveley Coal and Iron Company, Markham owned ironstone quarries, several coal mines (including Markham Colliery), chemical works, ironworks and an engineering works specialising in mining and tunnelling equipment.

Other major local industries in recent history have included Staveley Works foundry and Staveley Chemicals. The nationwide decline in industry has meant that Staveley Chemicals and Staveley Works have now almost entirely closed, with the only section of the chemical plant remaining being the P-aminophenol plant (a key component to making Paracetamol), which is run by American/Irish company Covidien. Notice has been served on the plant, earmarked for closure around June 2012, this closure will mark the end of over 100 yrs. of chemical production at Staveley..

It is also the home town of the Townes Brewery. Modern industry includes a plastic pipe moulding factory for Brett Martin plc. There was also a wood wool production unit on Staveley works.

The New Markham Vale Loop Road has been completed and opens up the former Markham coal field areas to development, linking the town to a new junction (29A) on the M1 motorway, this junction opened in early July 2008. This is part funded by European Union regeneration money. The scheme also reinstates part of the former Chesterfield Canal which crosses the route. There is a long-term project to reinstate the canal from Chesterfield to Kiveton where it currently terminates. Sections from Chesterfield to Brimington were reinstated as part of previous stages of the Chesterfield Bypass and opencast schemes on part of the former Staveley Coal and Iron Company site which was part of British Steel Corporation following Nationalisation. The new Staveley Town Basin was officially opened on 30 June 2012 and forms the centre piece of the imaginative redevelopment of the Chesterfield Canal in Staveley. The basin is designed to provide facilities to enable the economic development of the isolated section in advance of full restoration. It will provide secure short- and long-term moorings, slipway, car parking, cycle racks, toilets and showers as well as a large open play area which can also be used for major waterway events and festivals.

As part of the Markham Vale scheme to regenerate the site of the former Markham Colliery site there was a proposal to build a "Solar Pyramid" to form the world's largest functional timepiece. This project has now been cancelled. However, on the site near Poolsbrook Country Park, a caravan site for tourists has now been built boosting numbers to the country park. The area has several trails for walkers and mountain bikers along former pit railway lines.

== Staveley Hall ==
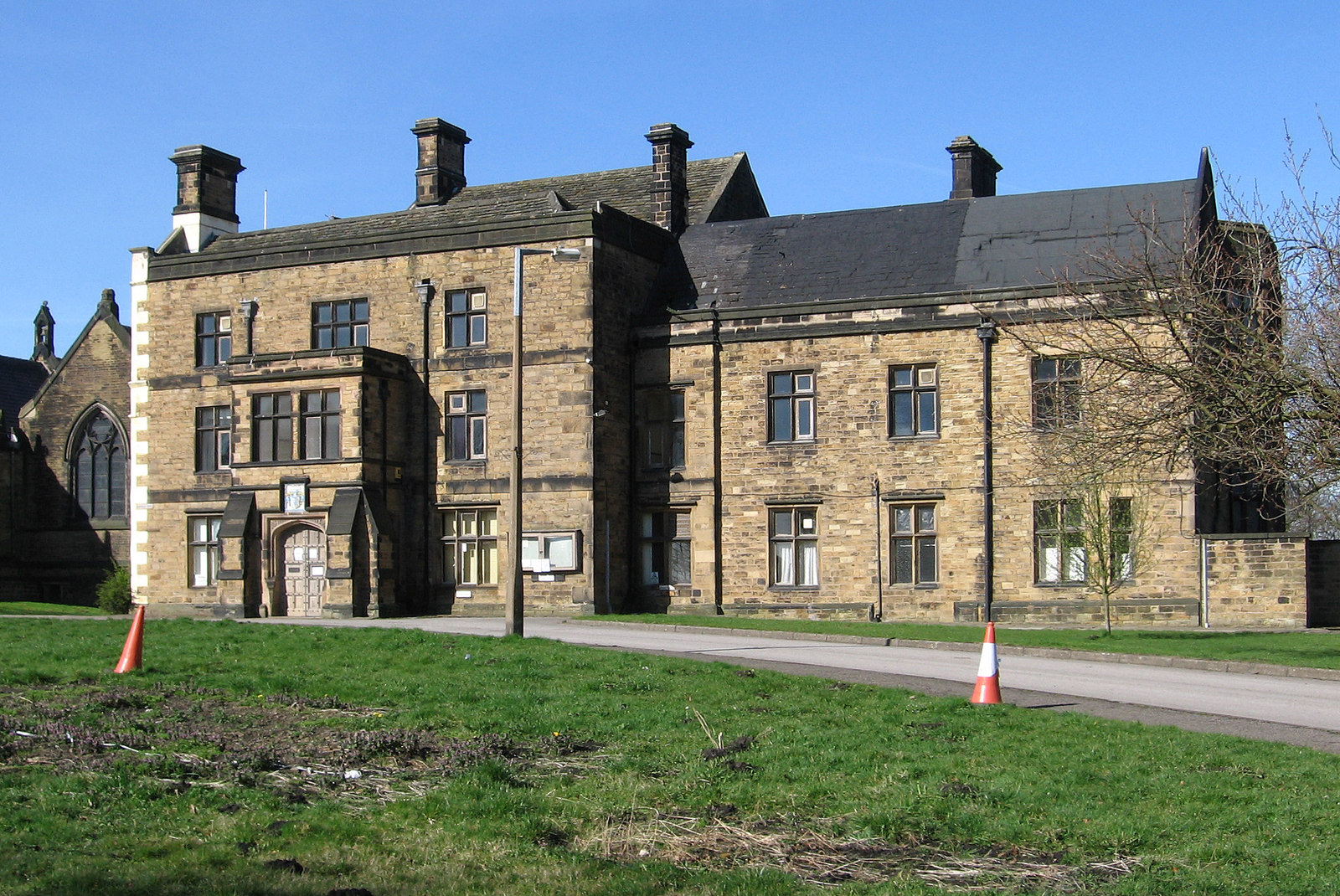
Staveley Hall

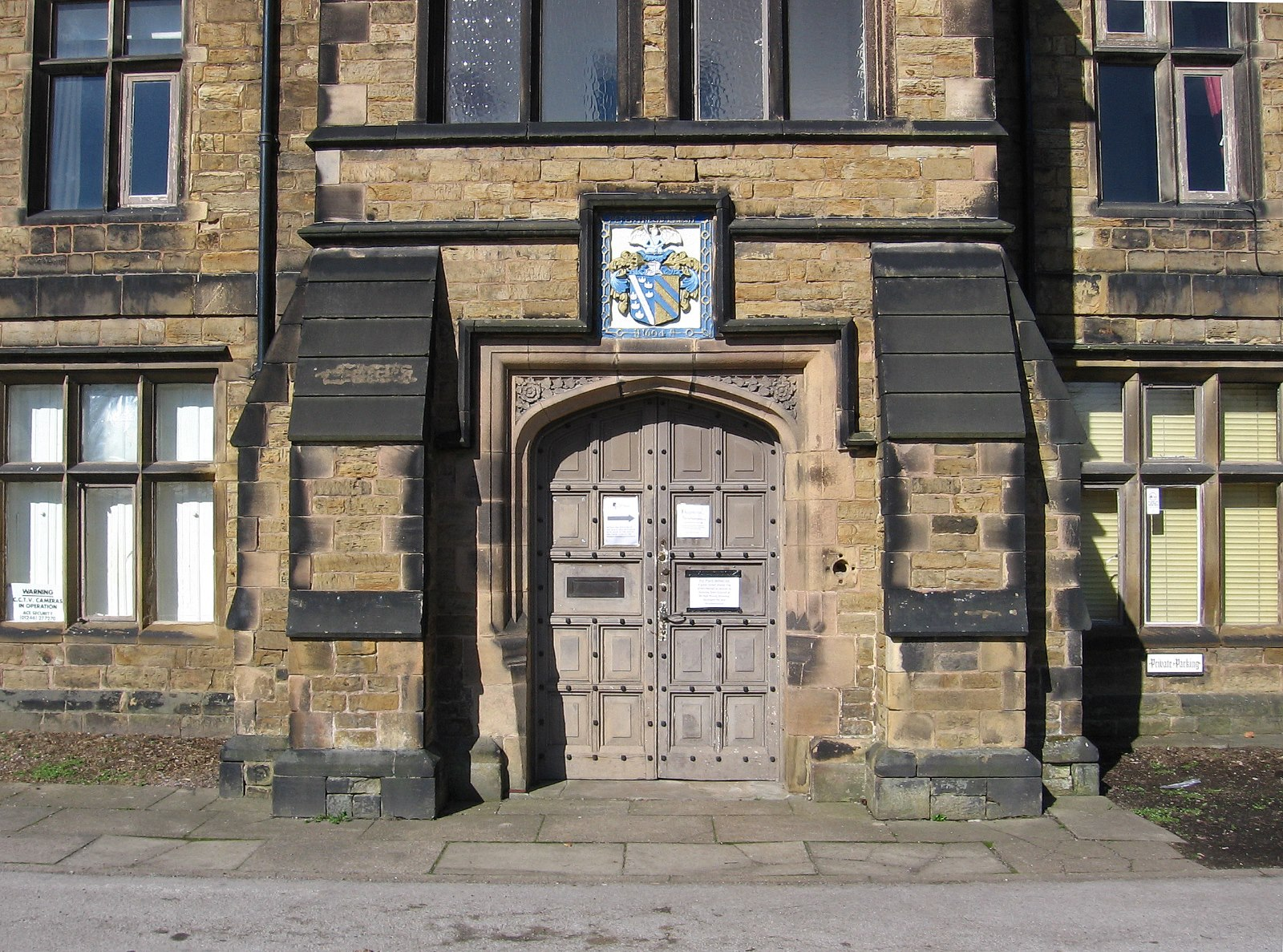
Staveley Hall – main entrance

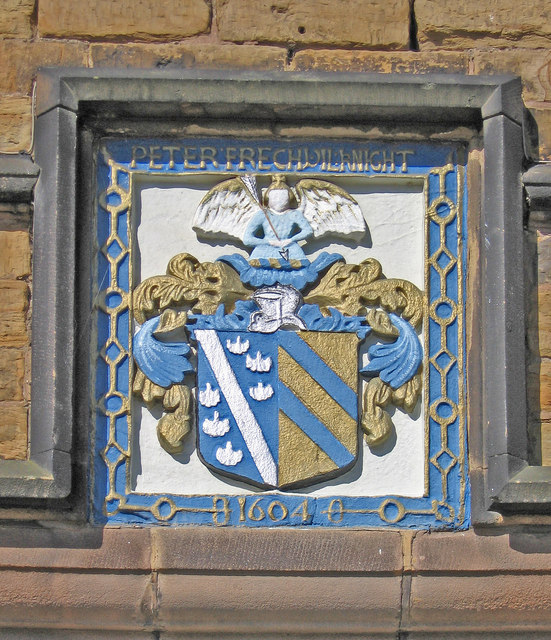
1604 heraldic shield above the front door of Staveley Hall, showing the arms of the father of Sir Peter Frechville (d.1634) ( Azure, a bend between six escallops argent), impaling Kay (for his second wife Margaret Kaye, daughter of Arthur Kaye of Woodsome, Yorkshire) Argent, two bendlets sable (painted incorrectly here as Or, two bendlets azure)

Staveley Hall is situated to the northeast of St John The Baptist Church in Staveley, with vehicular access from the Lowgates traffic island. The Hall in its present form was built in 1604 by Sir Peter Frecheville (c.1571–1634), MP. Before the current building there had been buildings on this site for over 700 years. A brief history of the building and its ownership follows:

- Hascuit de Musard was awarded the Manor of Staveley after the Norman Conquest of 1066.
- In 1306 the Musard family died out and Ralph de Frecheville became the new Lord.
- The Frechevilles lived in the Hall until they died out in 1682. In 1603 Sir Peter de Frecheville was knighted by James I at Worksop and he wished to make Staveley Hall a suitable residence for a knight and Justice of the Peace.
- The architect of Sir Peter de Frecheville's house is not known but may well be Huntingdon Smithson – the architect employed by the Cavendishes at Bolsover Castle.
- In 1682 and the house was sold to the Cavendish family. James Cavendish died in 1751 and the Hall and Park reverted to the Duke of Devonshire.
- In 1756 the Rector of Staveley managed to persuade the Duke of Devonshire to allow his son (and then a series of clerics) to live there.
- It remained as a rectory until bought by Staveley Urban District Council in 1967.
- The Hall was designated by English Heritage as a listed building (grade II) in 1974.
- Upon Local Government reorganisation in 1974 ownership passed to Chesterfield Borough Council and it was eventually bought by Staveley Town Council.

== Transport ==
Staveley was formerly served by four railway stations on two separate lines.

- Staveley Central was on the Great Central Main Line and Chesterfield Loop. It opened in 1892 as "Staveley Town" until being renamed as "Staveley Central" in 1950. It closed to passengers in 1964 and to freight in the 1980s. The platforms survived until the 2000s when a road, "Ireland Close", was built through the site. Nothing remains of the station other than the bridge carrying the road over the former railway.

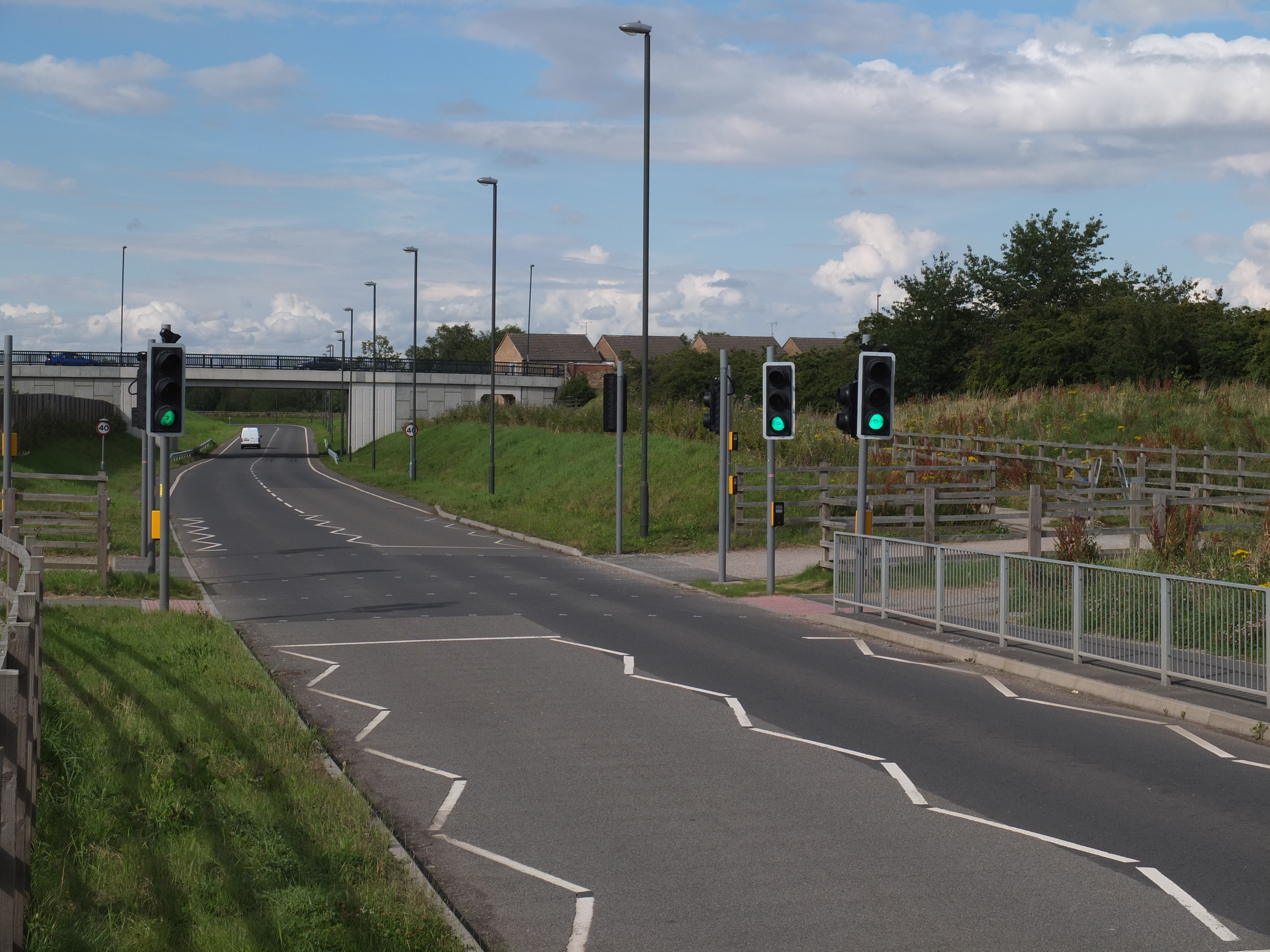
Staveley Central station site in 2012, now under a road.

- Staveley Works was on the former Great Central Main Line and was the next stop north after Staveley Central. The station served the former Staveley Works. It opened in 1892 and closed in 1963. The platforms still survive although the site is now undeveloped land.

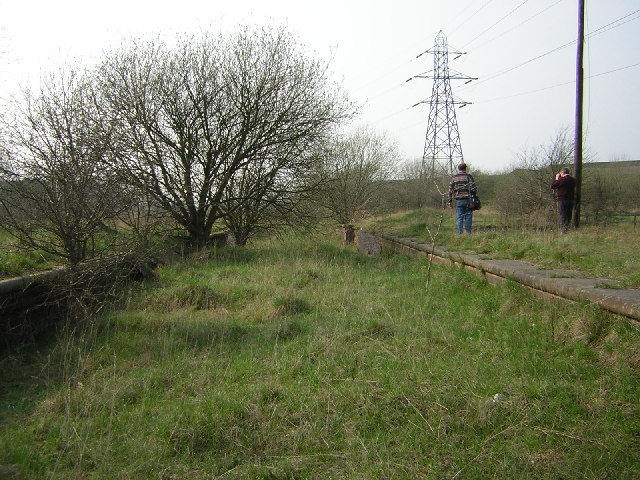
Platforms at the former Staveley Works station site

- Barrow Hill was on the Doe Lea branch line from Chesterfield to Mansfield Woodhouse and the Old Road line from Chesterfield to Rotherham. The station opened in 1841 as "Staveley", only to then be renamed as "Barrow Hill and Staveley Works" in 1900 and finally renamed as "Barrow Hill" in 1951. It closed to passengers in 1954 and to all traffic in 1981. The site was cleared after closure and the line between Rotherham and Chesterfield still runs through the site. The Doe Lea Branch closed in the 1990s and the track has since been lifted. There have been proposals to reopen the station to serve the town of Staveley and surrounding areas.

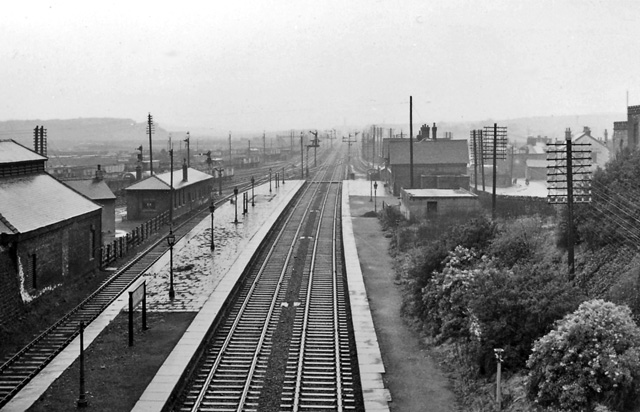
The station in 1961

- Staveley Town was on the former Doe Lea and Clowne branch lines which connected the town to nearby towns of Bolsover and Clowne. The station opened in 1888 as "Netherthorpe" with the opening of the Clowne Branch Line. The line to Mansfield Woodhouse was then opened in 1890 and the station was renamed "Netherthorpe for Staveley Town" in 1893. The station was then finally renamed "Staveley Town" in 1900. The Doe Lea Branch closed to passengers in 1930 and the station was served by services on the Clowne Branch only until 1952. The station was demolished and the line was still in use until the 1990s when the branch lines were closed to both Creswell and Bolsover and Mansfield Woodhouse (after 1974). The site is now an unmarked footpath and there have been proposals to reuse this section of the railway for a possible Chesterfield to Rotherham line.

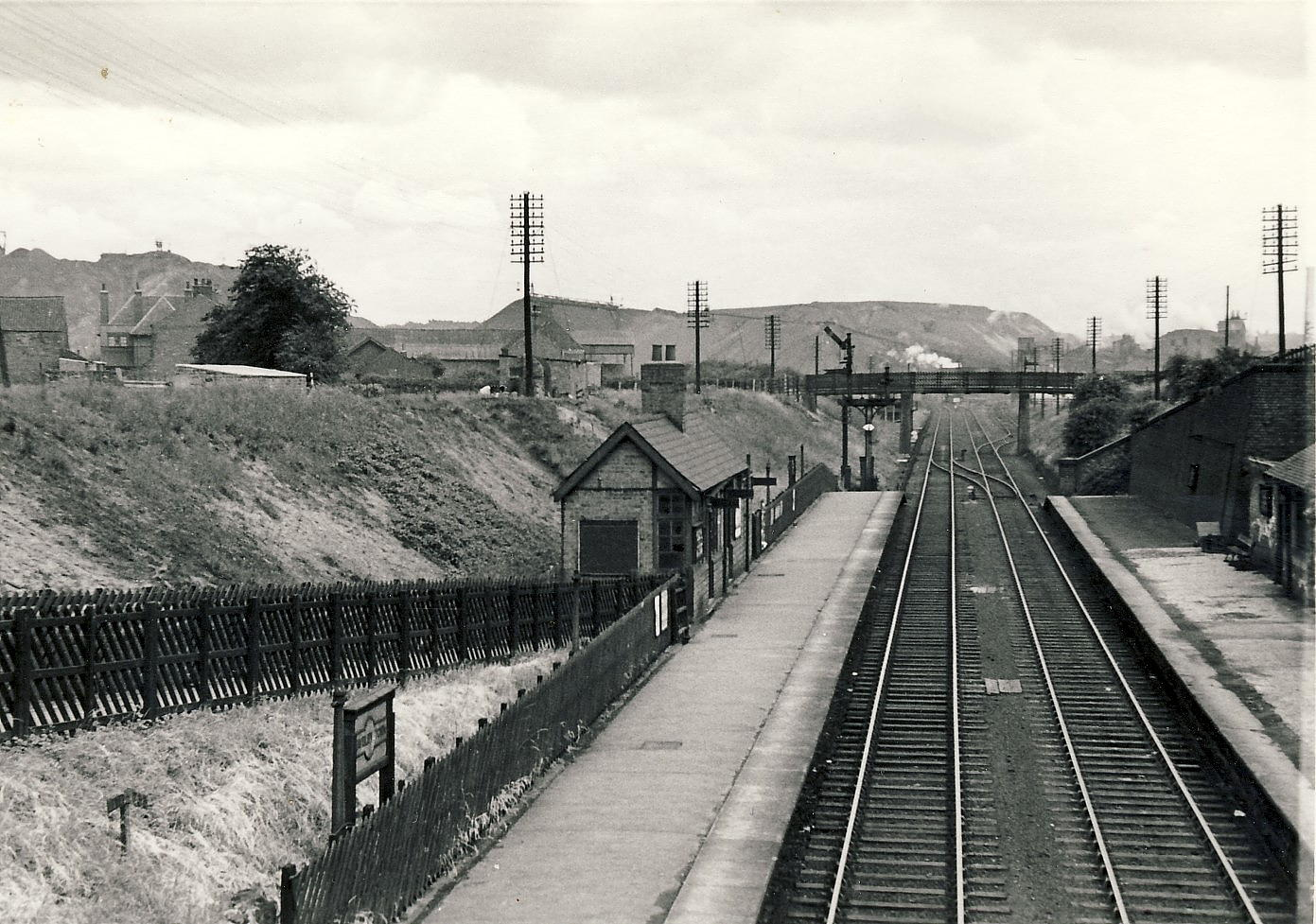
Staveley Town in 1956

=== Proposed Bypass ===
A bypass has been proposed between Staveley and Brimington since 1927. When the A61 Rother Way (also known as the Chesterfield Bypass) was constructed in the 1980s, a short dual carriageway spur was constructed over the River Rother and the Canal, terminating at a large roundabout which has an access road to a supermarket and the single carriageway A619 continuing to Brimington. The dual carriageway was planned to continue, heading northwards through Wheeldon Mill Greyhound Stadium (since demolished) before crossing the Canal twice and following the course of the Rother through Staveley Works. There would have likely been a grade separated junction between Mill Green and Hall Lane to serve the town and the nearby village of Barrow Hill. Then the dual carriageway would have curved eastward and run north of Mastin Moor, connecting to Junction 30 of the M1 at Barlborough. The plans caused controversy as the crossing of the Canal would have divided it into five linear ponds, and a petition put a halt to the bypass plans, but not before digging of a cutting had commenced.

In 2009, the A6192 Ireland Close was built, connecting a small roundabout on Hall Lane to several more roundabouts near Poolsbrook, then to Junction 29A.

As part of regeneration proposals for Staveley Works, there is a 'spine road' proposed to run from the superstore roundabout off Rother Way to Hall Lane. However it is planned to be low speed single carriageway with several roundabouts or signal controlled junctions, which may create even more congestion.

In July 2019, the MP for North East Derbyshire, Lee Rowley, gained support for a proper Staveley Bypass from the government.

== Media ==
Local news and television programmes are provided by BBC Yorkshire and ITV Yorkshire. Television signals are received from the Emley Moor TV transmitter and the Chesterfield TV transmitter.

Radio stations are BBC Radio Sheffield, Hits Radio South Yorkshire, Greatest Hits Radio Yorkshire and local radio stations that broadcast from Chesterfield: S41 Radio, Elastic FM, Chesterfield Radio and Spire Radio.

The Derbyshire Times is the weekly local newspaper that serves the town.

== Notable people ==
- Francis Rodes (c. 1530–1588), judge, built the nearby Barlborough Hall and helped found Netherthorpe School.
- Robert Keyes (1565–1606), participant in the Gunpowder Plot for which he was executed, son of the then Rector of Staveley.
- John Frescheville, 1st Baron Frescheville (1607–1682), who family seat was in Staveley was elected an MP 1628–9 and 1661–9. He was a deputy lieutenant 1639–42 and 1660, a justice of the peace from 1660, and a gentleman of the privy chamber in 1639–45.
- Thomas Rawson Birks (1810–1883), theologian, controversialist and Cambridge Professor
- W.M. Hodgkins (1833–1898), artist and activist in New Zealand, went to school locally
- Henry Jarvis (1839–1907), coal miner, trade unionist and from 1883 worked for the Derbyshire Miners' Association.
- James Martin (1850–1933), a trade unionist, became President of the Derbyshire Miners' Association from 1906 to 1917,.
- William Hallam (1856–1902), President of the Derbyshire Miners' Association, from 1890 to 1898, and clerk to Staveley Parish Council.
- Chris Spedding (born 1944), rock and roll and jazz guitarist
- Nick Ainger (born 1949), politician and MP for Carmarthen West and South Pembrokeshire, was educated at Netherthorpe School.
- Alan Hardwick (born 1949), former journalist and TV presenter, he was the Lincolnshire Police and Crime Commissioner from 2012 to 2016.

=== Sport ===
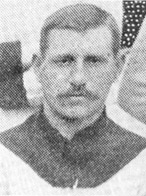
Sam Raybould, 1900

- George Hay (1851–1913), cricketer who played 55 First-class cricket games for Derbyshire
- Dickie Baugh (1864–1929), footballer who played 185 games for Wolverhampton Wanderers
- Harry Lilley (1868–1900), footballer, played 52 games for Sheffield United and one for England
- Sam Raybould (1875–1949), footballer, played 282 games including 211 for Liverpool
- Joe Lievesley (1883–1941), football goalkeeper who played 351 games including 278 for Sheffield United
- Abel Lee (1884–1929), footballer who played 236 games including 150 for Gillingham
- Charles Barley (1904–1962), footballer who played 194 games for Reading
- Leslie Lievesley (1911–1949), footballer who played 271 games including 130 for Torquay United
- Alan Stevenson (born 1950), football goalkeeper who played 601 games including 438 for Burnley
- Alan Morris (born 1953), cricketer, who played 49 First-class cricket games for Derbyshire
- Gary Pollard (born 1959), footballer who played 192 games beginning with 87 for Chesterfield

== See also ==
- Listed buildings in Staveley, Derbyshire
