= William Sewell (trade unionist) =

British trade unionist

William Sewell (22 September 1852 – 24 May 1948) was a British trade unionist.

Born in Worksop, Sewell moved to Derbyshire at the age of nine and began working at a coal mine in Renishaw. He became active in the South Yorkshire Miners' Association, and subsequently was a leading figure in the split which formed the Derbyshire Miners' Association (DMA). He was then working at Holbrook Colliery, and was its first delegate to the DMA. He also served on Eckington Parish Council for many years from 1894, initially as a Liberal-Labour representative, then later for the Labour Party, but only reluctantly, on the insistence of his union.

Sewell served on the council of the DMA for many years, and was elected as its vice-president in 1907, then as president in 1918, around which point he stopped working underground, on account of his age. He stood down from his union post in 1924, living in Halfway until his death, aged 95.

Trade union offices
Preceded by Frank Hall	Vice President of the Derbyshire Miners' Association; 1907 – 1918	Succeeded by Samuel Sales
Preceded by James Martin	President of the Derbyshire Miners' Association; 1918 – 1924	Succeeded by Enoch Overton
