= Frank Hall (trade unionist) =

English trade unionist

Frank Hall (1860 – 2 December 1927) was an English trade unionist.

Hall began working at a coal mine at the age of ten, becoming a checkweighman sixteen years later. He became active in the Derbyshire Miners' Association, and was elected as its treasurer in 1907, then when W. E. Harvey died in 1914, he was elected as the new general secretary. He also served on the executive of the Miners' Federation of Great Britain from 1914.

Hall was shortlisted as the Derbyshire Miners' candidate for the 1914 North East Derbyshire by-election. He was selected by the union's executive, partly on the grounds that he was willing to run as a Labour Party candidate. However, a vote of all the union's members overturned the executive's decision, and the union's president James Martin was instead selected to stand. Instead, Hall was selected to contest Clay Cross at the 1918 general election, but he lost narrowly to the Coalition Liberal candidate, Thomas Tucker Broad.

Hall served as secretary of the Derbyshire Miners' until his death in 1927.

Trade union offices
Preceded by Frederick Bonsall	Vice President of the Derbyshire Miners' Association; 1906–1907	Succeeded by William Hallam
Preceded by Henry Jarvis	Treasurer of the Derbyshire Miners' Association; 1907–1914	Succeeded by Frank Lee
Preceded by W. E. Harvey	General Secretary of the Derbyshire Miners' Association; 1914–1927	Succeeded by Harry Hicken
