= Netherthorpe =

Netherthorpe can refer to various locations in England:

- Netherthorpe, Derbyshire
- Netherthorpe, Sheffield, a suburb of Sheffield
- Netherthorpe Airfield, near Worksop
