= Whittington, Derbyshire =

Whittington may refer to the following places in Derbyshire:

- Old Whittington, a town located to the north of Chesterfield
- New Whittington, a village located to the north of Old Whittington
- Whittington Moor, a town located to the south of the above
