= Hicken =

Hicken is a surname. Notable people with the surname include:

- Blair Hicken (born 1965), Canadian swimmer
- Barry Hicken (born 1946), Canadian politician and farmer
- Dan Hicken (born 1963), American television journalist
- Harry Hicken (1882–1964), English trade unionist
