= Henry Jarvis =

British trade unionist

Henry Jarvis (21 May 1839 – 10 May 1907) was a British trade unionist.

Born in Staveley in Derbyshire, Jarvis worked in a coal mine from the age of twelve. He was radicalised after he was locked out during a dispute at Pilley Green in 1854 and subsequently became active in the South Yorkshire Miners' Association (SYMA). Because of his trade unionism, he lost several jobs, but in 1883 found work for the Derbyshire Miners' Association (DMA), a split from the SYMA.

Because of his campaigning for the DMA, Jarvis was victimised and lost work. The DMA gave him £5 to set up in business as a travelling salesman and the grateful Jarvis combined this new job with the presidency of the DMA, serving from 1884 until 1887, then as the union's treasurer, in which post he served until his death in 1907. As treasurer, he was able to build up both the union's funds and membership.

Trade union offices
Preceded by Richard Bunting	President of the Derbyshire Miners' Association; 1884 – 1887	Succeeded by ?
Preceded by ?	Treasurer of the Derbyshire Miners' Association; 1887 – 1907	Succeeded by Frank Hall
