= John Frith (trade unionist) =

British trade unionist

John Frith (6 July 1837 – 17 February 1904) was a British trade unionist.

Born in Rawmarsh, Frith followed his father into coal mining, beginning as a trapper at the age of ten, and then working his way up to become a coal getter. In 1858, he was a founding member of the South Yorkshire Miners' Association (SYMA), forming a lodge in Rawmarsh. In 1873, he relocated to Roundwood, and the following year, he was elected as president of the union. In 1875, the union's leader, John Normansell, died, and Frith took over as secretary.

When Frith became leader of the union, the price of coal was falling, leading to wage cuts. The SYMA had invested in the Shirland Colliery Company, which collapsed in 1877, losing all the union's funds. The union also lost its members in Derbyshire, who transferred to the new Derbyshire Miners' Association. This succession of difficulties led Frith to arrange a merger between the SYMA and the West Yorkshire Miners' Association, forming the Yorkshire Miners' Association in 1881. He became the new union's first financial secretary, serving until his death in 1904.

Frith also served on Barnsley Town Council, as a Liberal-Labour member.

Trade union offices
Preceded by D. Moulson	President of the South Yorkshire Miners' Association; 1874–1875	Succeeded by ?
Preceded by John Normansell	General Secretary of the South Yorkshire Miners' Association; 1875–1881	Succeeded by Union merged
