= Francis Rodes =

English judge

Arms of Rodes: Argent, a lion passant gules between two acorns in bend azure cotised ermines

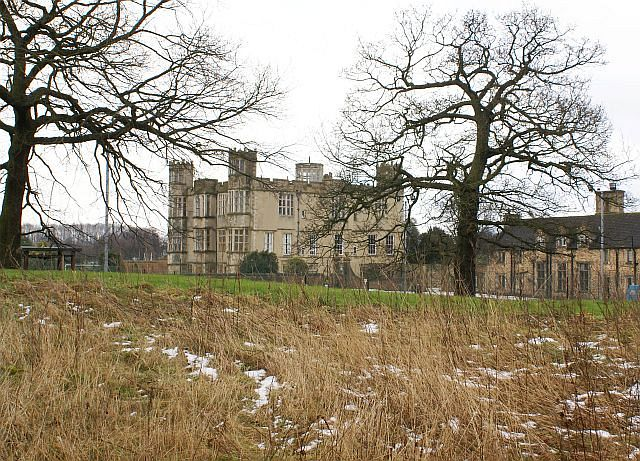
Barlborough Hall, Derbyshire, built by Sir Francis Rodes

Sir Francis Rodes (c. 1530–1588) of Barlborough Hall in the parish of Barlborough, Derbyshire, was an English judge who took part in the trial of Mary, Queen of Scots. He built Barlborough Hall and was one of the founders of Netherthorpe School.

== Origins ==
He was the son of John Rodes of Staveley Woodthorpe in Derbyshire, Sheriff of Derbyshire in 1591, by his first wife Attelina Hewett of the West Riding of Yorkshire. The Rodes family of Derbyshire was founded five generations before Francis by William Rodes, who married Emme Cachehors, daughter and heiress of John Cachehors/Cachehaus of Staveley Woodthorpe. The Rodes family traced its ultimate descent from Gerard de Rodes, a prominent baron in the reign of King Henry II (1154-1189).

== Career ==
Francis was educated at St. John's College, Cambridge, but did not graduate. In 1549 he was entered at Gray's Inn, and in 1552 was called to the bar. He was Lent Reader at his Inn in 1566, and double reader in 1576, and seems to have derived a considerable fortune from this practice. In 1577 Rodes purchased the manor of Hanley in the parish of Steveley from Edmund West. In 1578 he was raised to the degree of the Coif, and on 21 August 1582 he was made Queen's Serjeant. On 29 June 1585 he was raised to the bench as Justice of the Common Pleas, and in October 1586 he took part in the trial of Mary, Queen of Scots, at Fotheringay Castle, though not as one of the main judges.

== Landholdings ==
His principal seat was at Barlborough, Derbyshire, where he built Barlborough Hall, which is still standing; he also purchased extensive estates at Billingsley, Shropshire, Darfield, South Yorkshire, Great Houghton, South Yorkshire and Little Houghton, South Yorkshire.

== Marriages and children ==
Rodes married twice:

- Firstly to Elizabeth Sandford of Thorpe Salvine, Yorkshire, by whom he had children including:
  - Sir John Rodes (1562–1639), eldest son and heir, whose son Sir Francis Rodes, 1st Baronet (died 1645) was created a baronet on 14 August 1641. The title became extinct on the death of Sir John Rodes, 4th Baronet, in 1743.
- Secondly to Mary Charlton of Apley in Shropshire, whose sister Elizabeth Charlton married John Manners, 4th Earl of Rutland, who appointed Rodes one of his executors. By his second wife he had children including:
  - Sir Godfrey Rodes (died 1634), eldest son by his second wife, who inherited from his father the manors of Darfield and Great Houghton. His son Sir Edward Rodes (1599–1666), served as Sheriff of Yorkshire, a Colonel of Horse under Oliver Cromwell and was a member of Cromwell's privy council. He served as High Sheriff of Perthshire and represented Perth in the Parliaments of 1656–1658 and 1659–1660. Sir Edward's sister Elizabeth Rodes was the third wife of Thomas Wentworth, 1st Earl of Strafford.

== Death and legacy ==
Rodes died towards the end of 1588 at Staveley Woodthorpe. His will, dated 7 June 1587, was proved on 28 April 1591. Among numerous other benefactions he made bequests to St. John's College, Cambridge, and to the newly founded the grammar school Netherthorpe School. His 'Reports' were among the manuscript collections of Sir John Maynard (1602–1690) and are now in the library of Lincoln's Inn. A quote from an 1857 directory:

Netherthorpe School.—Francis Rodes, by will, 29th of Elizabeth, left a yearly rent charge of £20 per annum, to be taken forth of his manor of Elmton; £8 thereof to the Grammar School, at Staveley Netherthorpe, £8 for two scholarships in St John's College, Cambridge, and £4 for the relief of soldiers who should be sent to the wars out of Staveley, Barlborough, and Elmton.

Francis' gifts when combined with others from the Duke of Devonshire, Robert Sitwell and a local minister enabled the school to have an annual income of £29.
