= James Martin (trade unionist) =

British trade unionist

James Martin (6 May 1850 – 1 November 1933) was a British trade unionist.

Born in Basford, Nottinghamshire, Martin moved with his family to Staveley in Derbyshire when he was nine, and began working in the Speedwell Colliery, initially as a door-trapper, then later as a driver. In 1864, he joined the Primitive Methodists, and two years later, became a preacher in his spare time, remaining active in the church for the rest of his life.

Martin attended night school and became an active trade unionist, working with William Brown to try to form a union of Derbyshire miners. Unsuccessful, he instead joined the South Yorkshire Miners' Association, becoming secretary of a Staveley branch. In 1876, Martin was appointed as sub-checkweighman at Fairwell Colliery, then in 1882, checkweighman at Ireland Colliery. When the Derbyshire Miners' Association formed in 1880, he transferred his allegiance, and was secretary of the branch at Ireland. From 1906 until 1917, he was president of the union.

Martin also became active in Liberal Party politics, acting as its sub-agent for Staveley from 1869 until 1914, and later becoming president of the North East Derbyshire Liberal Association. In 1894, he was elected to Staveley Parish Council, and from 1896 until 1913, he chaired the council. He agreed to stand as a Labour Party candidate in the 1914 North East Derbyshire by-election, in line with union policy, and left his Liberal Party posts, but he was not elected.

Suffering poor health, Martin left his union posts in 1917, living out his final years in a nursing home in nearby Sheffield.

Trade union offices
Preceded by Barnet Kenyon	President of the Derbyshire Miners' Association; 1906–1917	Succeeded by William Sewell
