= Charles Barley =

English footballer

Personal information
- Full name: John Charles Barley
- Date of birth: 2 December 1895
- Place of birth: Staveley, England
- Date of death: 1962 (aged 57–58)
- Position: Wing-half

Senior career*
Years	Team	Apps	(Gls)
1924–1926	Staveley Town		
1926–1929	Arsenal	8	(1)
1929–1937	Reading	194	(16)
1937	Maidenhead United		
Total		202	(17)
- * Club domestic league appearances and goals

John Charles Barley (30 October 1904 – 1962) was an English footballer who played in the Football League for Arsenal and Reading.
