= The Derbyshire Miners' Holiday Camp =

The Derbyshire Miners' Holiday Camp at Skegness, on the east coast of England, was opened in May 1939, to provide an annual holiday for Derbyshire coal miners and their families. It was seen as a pioneering venture and was part of a broad range of welfare benefits provided by a national Miners' Welfare Scheme established in the 1920s. The camp enabled miners and their families to have a week's holiday by the sea, many for the first time. Its creation owed much to the campaigning work of the trades union, the Derbyshire Miners' Association and, in particular, to the inspiration of Henry Hicken, one of the Derbyshire Miners' leaders. The Skegness camp finally closed in the late 1990s, coinciding with the demise of the British coal mining industry and the continued growth in the availability of affordable holidays in Spain and elsewhere. A similar, but smaller, camp for Derbyshire miners and their families was opened after the Second World War, in Rhyl, on the north coast of Wales.

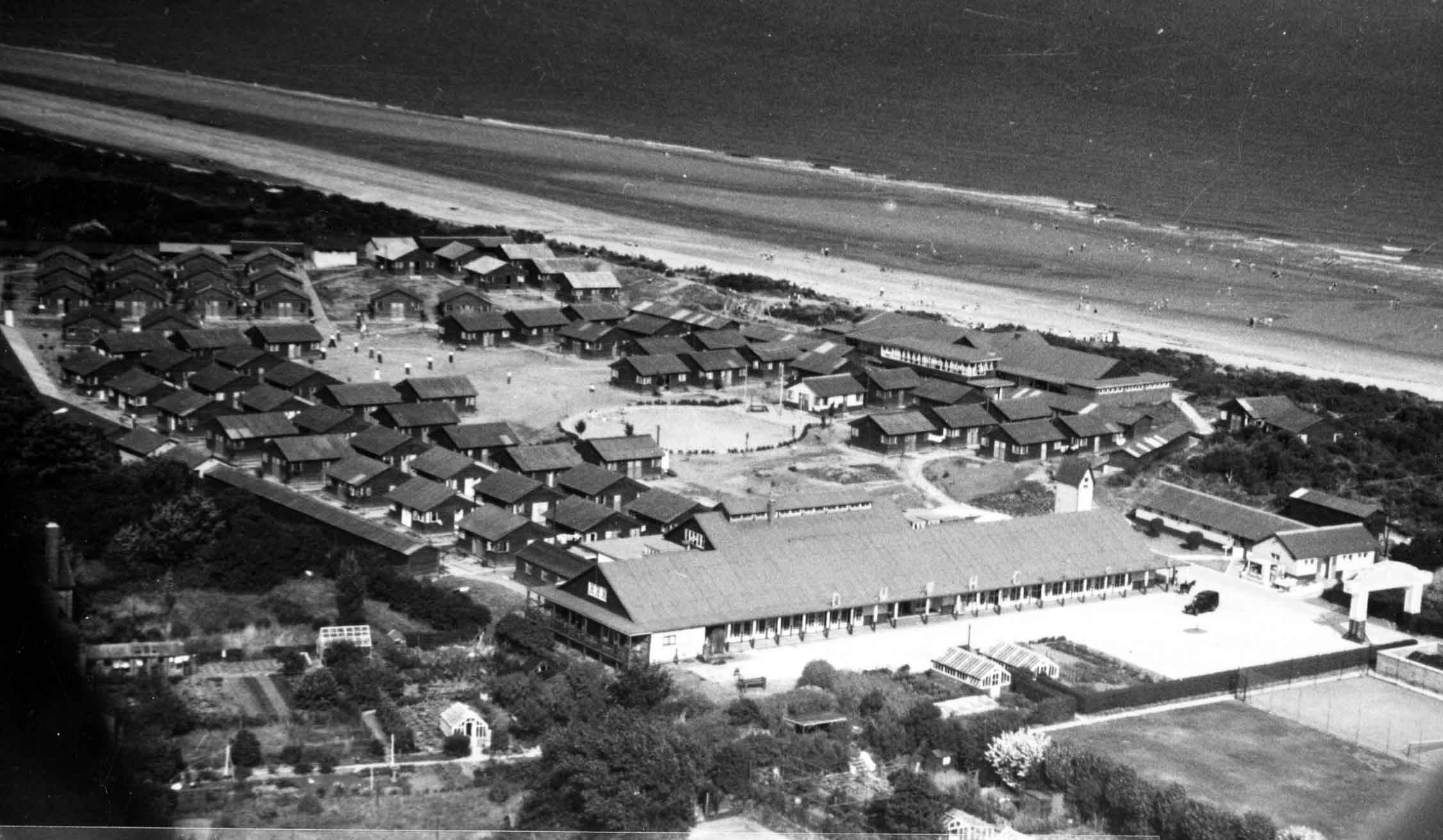
The original 1939 layout of the Derbyshire Miners' Holiday showing the wooden dining room and administration complex that was destroyed by fire in 1949.

== Origins ==
The Derbyshire Miner's Welfare Holiday Centre at Skegness was officially opened on 20 May 1939, by Sir Frederick Sykes, the Chairman of the Miners' Central Welfare Committee. At the opening ceremony he said: "I do not think there is any other non-profit making camp of the kind in the country. It is a pioneer venture which is being watched with close interest. When we remember that there are some 3,000,000 people in the mining community who are affected by the holidays with pay scheme this year, we can appreciate the importance of the lead which is being given here today." The main credit belongs to Henry Hicken, the General Secretary of The Derbyshire Miners' Association, and to the Derbyshire Miners' Welfare Committee and Welfare Fund.

The camp was built on part of the nine acres of land at Winthorpe in Skegness bought in 1925 by the Derbyshire Miners' Association initially for the purpose of building a miners' convalescence home overlooking the sea and with direct access to the beach. The convalescence home, or "Con Home" as it was called by the miners, was opened in 1928 accommodating 120 men and 30 women. Prior to that convalescence for Derbyshire miners was provided in rented accommodation in Skegness. The funds for the purchase of the site were raised by the local union branch committees from galas and dances. Some ten years later, a grant of £40,000 from the Miner's Welfare Fund and various contributions from the coal-owners, enabled the holiday camp to be built next to the convalescence home.

The Miners' Welfare Fund was a national fund and had its origins in the Mining Industry Act 1920 (10 & 11 Geo. 5. c. 50), which imposed on mine-owners a welfare levy on coal production, initially of a penny a ton. The fund was administered by the Miners' Welfare Committee consisting of representatives of mine-owners, mine-workers and some independent members. Pit-head baths, miners' institutes, canteens, recreation grounds, health services and educational activities were all supported by the fund. In the 1920s the miners campaigned for an annual holiday with pay and, in the 1930s, a Holiday Savings Scheme started which enabled Derbyshire pits to close for a week in the summer with a guaranteed payment to each miner. Most of the holiday money was contributed by the men as savings from their pay, with the colliery owners providing a smaller contribution. The Derbyshire miner, Henry Hicken, was instrumental in campaigning for miners' welfare benefits, including the holiday camp and the annual holiday scheme, and he was appointed to the Welfare Committee in 1938.

Born at North Wingfield, Derbyshire, in 1882, Henry Hicken left school at the age of twelve to work underground at Pilsley colliery as a pony lad earning 10d a shift, in pre-decimalisation money, or 4 pence in post-decimalisation money. In 1912 he was elected checkweighman at Williamthorpe Colliery and became Secretary of the Williamthorpe branch of the Derbyshire Miners' Association. Later, Henry was elected to the National Executive of the Miners' Federation of Great Britain, the forerunner of the National Union of Mineworkers (NUM). In 1942 he joined the Ministry of Fuel and Power and when the Industry was nationalised in 1947 he became Labour Director of the East Midlands Division of the National Coal Board (NCB). During his early years as a miner and miners' leader, Henry Hicken also ran an average of six study groups a week as well as being an outstanding Methodist lay preacher.

== Development of the camp ==
In the winter and spring of 1939 men from Vic Hallam Ltd built the camp with the aid of wooden panels pre-fabricated at the company's site in Heanor, Derbyshire. Initially the camp consisted of some 73 large wooden chalets each divided into four separate rooms providing basic sleeping accommodation for four married couples. Flanking the married couples' chalets were rows of 115 so-called "cubicles" for teenagers and single adults. Along the sea front were a series of large communal wooden buildings housing a children's theatre, lounge and billiards room. Young children were accommodated in a communal dormitory, originally a wooden building overlooking the sea front, and then later replaced by a brick block. Just behind the main entrance to the camp was the largest wooden building of all, which housed the main reception area, dining hall and concert hall. Joseph Lynch, the then secretary to the Derbyshire Miners' Association, gave this description of one of the original chalets: "There is provided a double bed which during the daytime may be folded back to the wall and obscured by a curtain, leaving a spacious sitting-room with two chairs and a table. A built-in wardrobe is provided and a wash bowl with water laid on. The floor is covered by a central carpet. The window and bed curtains and bedspread are being merged in a general colour scheme for each chalet expressive of the holiday spirit."

In 1949 fire destroyed the dining hall, kitchens and concert hall, though most of the other buildings survived, including the chalets. By this time Henry Hicken's influence had now been overshadowed by that of Derbyshire union leader, Bert Wynn, who persuaded the trustees, despite objections from Hicken, to seek an alcohol sales licence for the camp. The new facilities to replace those destroyed by the fire, were built of steel and brick, and included several bars serving alcohol. The new facilities were opened in July 1951 by Viscount Lord Hyndley at an official opening ceremony followed by a grand reception in the new theatre. Also in the early 1950s, a purpose-built block was constructed in brick next to the old "Con Home" to provide facilities for the many paraplegic miners who had been injured underground. This Paraplegic Block, or "Para Block" as it was called by the miners themselves, was replaced by improved facilities for paraplegic miners in the 1970s. In the late 1950s and early 1960s, all the original wooden structures throughout the whole camp were gradually replaced by brick buildings as new facilities and features were added. In 1960 an open-air heated swimming pool was built and later an indoor heated swimming pool, sauna and health facilities were added. Eventually, additional land was purchased for providing more car parking and sports facilities. In 1975 a new building complex consisting of the Drifters Club, supermarket, amusement arcade, disco and snack bar was opened by Lawrence Daley, General Secretary of the National Union of Mineworkers (NUM). The following year saw the addition of a complex of self-catering flats, opened by Joe Gormley, President of the NUM.

== The 1953 floods, and the 1956 Hungarian uprising ==
In the early spring of 1953, raging seas brought widespread flooding and devastation to many parts of the Lincolnshire coast, including Skegness. There was little damage to the camp buildings thanks mainly to the sandbag walls hastily constructed by the miners bussed in overnight from Derbyshire. Warnings were given on Friday evening and by Saturday the North Derbyshire NUM Treasurer, Herbert Dilks, had organised busloads of more than 100 men from the three Markham Collieries to help save the camp. The camp provided temporary accommodation for refugees following the Hungarian uprising in 1956. By Christmas of that year the camp housed around 900 male refugees, many of them recruited in Vienna by the National Coal Board (NCB) for the sum of £8 and 6d per week. A member of staff, Jean Ellis, described Christmas Day lunch at the camp in 1956 as being a very moving occasion as the refugees rose to their feet, en masse, to sing the Hungarian National Anthem.

== Life at the camp ==
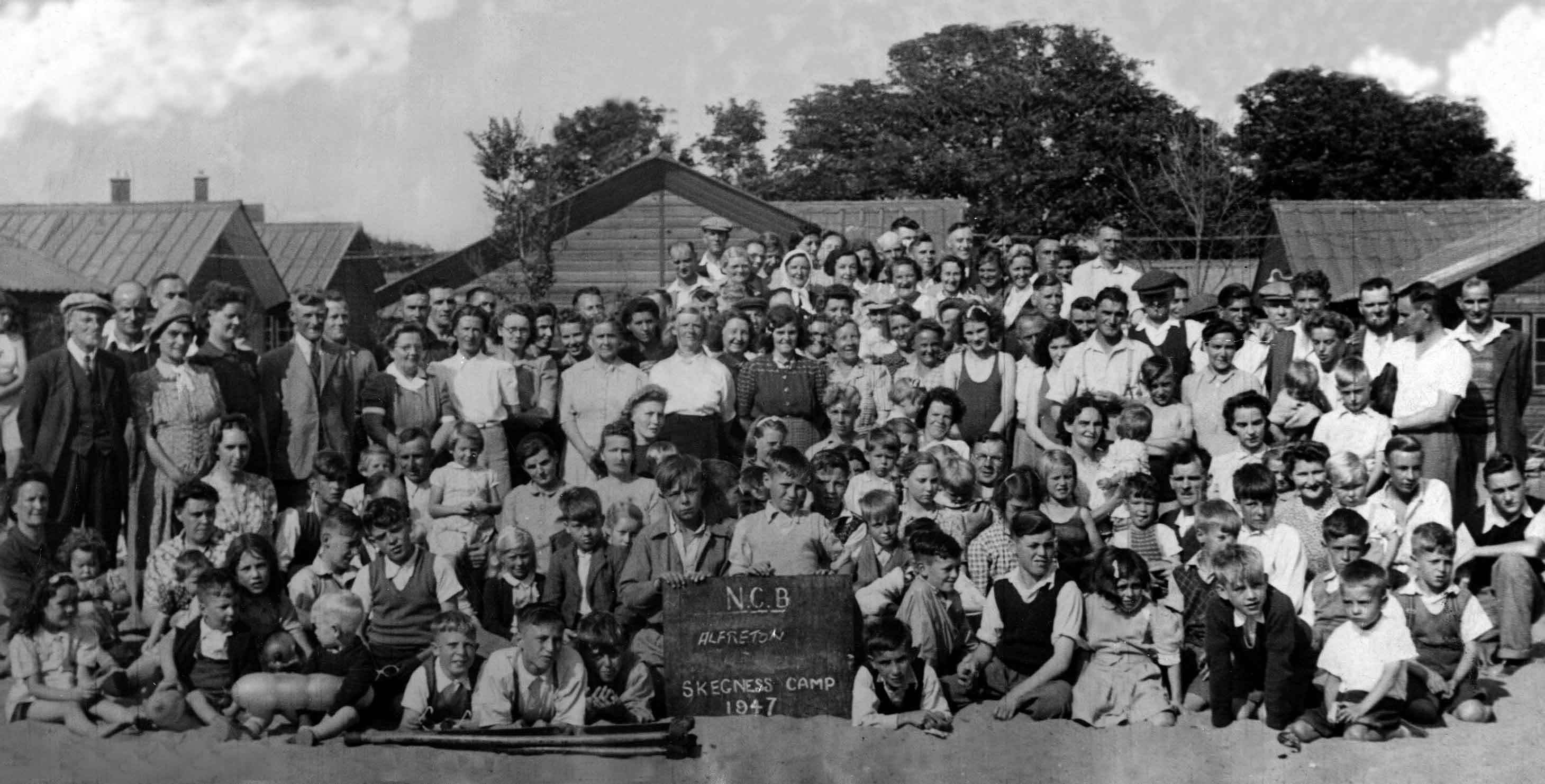
Miners' families, from the Alfreton area of Derbyshire, holidaying at the Derbyshire Miners' Holiday Camp in 1947.

For many of the miners and their families, a week at the camp at Skegness was their first holiday away from home and, for some, the first time they had seen the sea. In the 1940s, and early 1950s, much of the entertainment was organised by the miners themselves and involved simple activities and competitions such as "Ideal Holiday Girl", talent shows, treasure hunts, donkey races, tug a war, knobbly knees, darts, and football. The more unusual activities included competitions to establish who could sit on stage the longest without laughing, and who could sew the quickest and neatest patch on someone's backside. Towards the end of each season, for competitions such as the Ideal Holiday Girl and the Adult Talent Contest, the winners of each particular week throughout the season competed in the Grand Finals Weekend. After the early 1950s, entertainment at the camp became less participative and increasingly involved professional stage acts and eventually included high-profile performers such as Mike and Bernie Winters, Rosemary Squires, Tony Melody, Cy Grant, Lance Percival, Donald Peers, Kenny Ball and Tommy Cooper.
