= Listed buildings in Barlborough =

Barlborough is a civil parish in the Bolsover district of Derbyshire, England. The parish contains 29 listed buildings that are recorded in the National Heritage List for England. Of these, one is listed at Grade I, the highest of the three grades, six are at Grade II*, the middle grade, and the others are at Grade II, the lowest grade. The parish contains the village of Barlborough and the surrounding area. The listed buildings include two country houses, smaller houses and associated structures, a church, a village cross, farmhouses and farm buildings, a former almshouse, two monuments in a garden, the walls of a burial ground, a memorial gateway, and a school.

== Key ==
Grade	Criteria
I	Buildings of exceptional interest, sometimes considered to be internationally important
II*	Particularly important buildings of more than special interest
II	Buildings of national importance and special interest

== Buildings ==
Name and location	Photograph	Date	Notes	Grade
St James' Church; 53.28957°N 1.28584°W		12th century	The church, which was altered and extended through the centuries, is in sandstone with Welsh slate roofs. It consists of a nave with a clerestory, north and south aisles, a chancel with a north vestry and chapel, and a west tower with a north vestry and a south porch. The tower has three stages and string courses, above the porch is a trefoiled niche containing a statue, there are circular clock faces on the west and south fronts, the bell openings have two lights, and at the top is an embattled parapet with crocketed pinnacles.	II*
Village Cross; 53.29036°N 1.28715°W		14th century (probable)	The cross, which has been restored, is in sandstone. It has a square base with chamfered corners, on two octagonal steps. On this is a circular column with a moulded base and top, and a cube-shaped sundial with incised faces and metal gnomons. This is surmounted by a ball finial and a cross.	II*
Park Street Farmhouse; 53.29097°N 1.28695°W	—	Late 16th century	The farmhouse is in sandstone, partly rendered, with a pantile roof. There are two storeys and a T-shaped plan, with a front range of five bays and a rear wing. The round-arched doorway has a moulded surround, a fanlight, impost and jamb blocks, and a keystone. To its left is a round-headed stair window, and the other windows are sashes. At the rear is a mullioned and transomed window.	II
Barlborough Hall; 53.29917°N 1.28463°W		1583	A country house, later a school, it is in rendered sandstone on a chamfered plinth, with moulded bands, and embattled parapets. There are two storeys and a basement, a square plan, and a main south front of five bays. In the centre is a square two-storey porch with balustraded steps lead to a doorway that has paired Doric columns, pieces of entablature, and a doorway with a moulded Tudor arched head and carved spandrels. Above it is a coat of arms, a mullioned and transomed window, and another coat of arms. The outer bays contain three-storey polygonal bay windows rising to towers. In the recessed bays are a cross window in the basement and mullioned and transomed windows above. The north front contains a central square bay window, and there are canted bay windows on the other fronts.	I
Barlborough Old Hall; 53.29050°N 1.28661°W		1618	A former manor house that has been divided, it is in sandstone with quoins, and a pantile roof with coped gables and moulded kneelers. There are two storeys and an H-shaped plan. The north front has five bays, and contains two Tudor arched doorways with moulded surrounds, and mullioned windows. The east front has eight bays, the outer two bays at the ends projecting and gabled, and with two lean-to bays in the centre range.	II*
1–3 Church Street; 53.29032°N 1.28683°W		17th century	A group of three cottages of different dates. They are in sandstone with quoins, and a pantile roof with chamfered coped gables. There are two storeys and an L-shaped plan, with two ranges at right angles. The gable end of the left range faces the street and contains a Venetian window in the ground floor, and most of the other windows in the range are sash windows. The right range contains a doorway with a moulded surround, some windows are mullioned, and others are horizontally-sliding sashes.	II
Gazebo, Barlborough Hall; 53.29924°N 1.28644°W		17th century	The gazebo and attached outbuildings in the grounds of the hall are in stone, they have pantile roofs and coped gables, and are in one and two storeys. The left bay has a two-storey gabled bow window, with a blind cross window in the ground floor and two blind cross windows in the upper floor. Between the storeys and above the windows are panels with wreathed circles in relief, and over them is a moulded cornice. The range of outbuildings to the right has a ramped, gable, and coped parapet.	II*
Stable block, Barlborough Hall; 53.29907°N 1.28532°W	—	17th century	The stable block, which has been converted for residential use, is in brick and stone, and has tile roofs with coped gables and kneelers. It is mainly in two storeys, and forms three ranges round a courtyard, The east range has five symmetrical bays in the centre, three bays on the right, and two single-storey bays on the left. The central round-arched doorway has a moulded surround, half-columns and a cornice, and the windows are cross windows. The two left bays are gabled and contain cross windows and a circular window in the gable. The north range has eight bays, and contains three gabled dormers.	II
Barlborough House; 53.28922°N 1.28627°W	—	17th century	A sandstone house with a hipped Welsh slate roof, two storeys, and a symmetrical front of five bays. The central doorway has a moulded surround and a broken pediment on brackets. This is flanked by canted bay windows, and the upper contains sash windows.	II
Beightonfields Priory; 53.28576°N 1.31763°W	—	17th century	A small country house in sandstone and red brick, with quoins, and a tile roof with coped gables and kneelers. There are two storeys and attics, and an H-shaped plan. The west front has seven bays, the outer two bays projecting and gabled, and the central doorway has a moulded surround and a segmental pediment. In the right front is a two-storey canted bay window, and at the rear is a doorway approached by semicircular steps. Most of the windows are sashes, there are also two stair windows, cross windows, gabled roof dormers, and 20th-century windows.	II*
Park Hall; 53.30410°N 1.30724°W		17th century	A small country house, later a hotel, in sandstone with floor bands, and stone slate roofs with coped gables and ball finials. There are three storeys, a square plan, and fronts of three gabled bays. On the garden front are three two-storey square bay windows with embattled parapets, the middle bay containing a round-arched entrance and a doorway with a fanlight, and in the gables are small windows with pointed arches. The entrance front contains a two-storey porch. Some windows are sashes, some are cross windows, and others are mullioned, or mullioned and transomed.	II*
Barn south of Priory Farmhouse; 53.28576°N 1.31694°W	—	17th century (probable)	A sandstone barn with a pantile roof, three storeys and a basement. The openings include doorways, vents, and other square openings. A pigeon roost runs round the building under the eaves, and on the north gable end are external steps.	II
Gate piers and walls east of Barlborough Hall; 53.29907°N 1.28415°W	—	18th century	The main gate piers flanking the entrance to the hall are in sandstone, and are rusticated with a square plan. Each pier has a moulded top and a ball finial, and between them are wrought iron gates and pilasters. They are flanked by ramped walls with a chamfered plinth and chamfered copings, and contain piers with urns.	II
Clowne Fields Farmhouse; 53.28835°N 1.28351°W	—	18th century	The farmhouse is in sandstone, and has a roof of Welsh slate with coped gables. There are two storeys and a symmetrical front of three bays. The central doorway has rusticated jambs and a plain lintel, and the windows are sashes with wedge lintels and keystones.	II
Barn northwest of Priory Farmhouse; 53.28599°N 1.31726°W	—	18th century	A group of outbuildings in sandstone with roofs of pantile and Welsh slate. They have two storeys, and consist of two staggered rectangular ranges. The south range has external steps, and contains flat-arched doorways. A lower link attaches it to the north range that contains a large cart entry, doorways, including stable doors, and a sash window.	II
Stone Croft; 53.28904°N 1.28430°W		Mid 18th century	The house is in sandstone and has a pantile roof with coped gables and moulded kneelers. There are two storeys and a symmetrical front of three bays. The central doorway has a moulded hood mould, and the windows are sashes with wedge lingtels and keystones.	II
The Pole Almshouses; 53.28934°N 1.28479°W		1752	The former almshouse is in sandstone, rendered at the rear, with quoins, and a Welsh slate roof, hipped to the south and with twin coped gables and moulded kneelers to the north. There are two storeys and a symmetrical south front of three bays. The central doorway has a plain surround, and the windows are mullioned. Above the doorway is an inscribed stone panel.	II
2 Church Street; 53.29002°N 1.28702°W	—	Late 18th century	A house in red brick and sandstone, with sandstone dressings, quoins, a dentilled eaves cornice, and a Welsh slate roof. There are two storeys and a symmetrical front of three bays. The central doorway and the windows, which are casements, all have brick wedge lintels and stone keystones.	II
Coach house, Barlborough House; 53.28928°N 1.28661°W	—	Late 18th century	The coach house, later converted for residential use, is in sandstone, and has a Welsh slate roof with coped gables and moulded kneelers. There are two storeys, four bays, and a lower L-shaped wing to the southwest. It contains a segmental arched carriage entrance, and sash windows. On the roof is a stepped square clock and bell turret, with a concave pyramidal roof.	II
Doric monument 53.28704°N 1.28324°W	—	Early 19th century	The monument is in the garden of Sycamore House, and is in sandstone. It consists of a pair of full-size Doric columns, between which is a lintel with a moulded cornice. There are inscriptions on both faces of the lintel.	II
Embattled monument 53.28696°N 1.28318°W	—	Early 19th century	The monument is in the garden of Sycamore House, and is in sandstone. It consists of two square piers with crocketed pinnacles, between which is an embattled shallow arch. There are inscriptions on the arch and on the inner faces of the piers.	II
The Old Rectory; 53.28913°N 1.28549°W	—	Early 19th century	The rectory, later a private house, is rendered, with sandstone dressings, angle pilasters, a moulded eaves cornice, and a hipped Welsh slate roof. There are two storeys and a symmetrical front of five bays. The windows are sashes, the middle window in the ground floor with a triangular pediment on brackets, and in the roof are three dormers. At the rear are three bays, the middle bay containing a round-headed doorway with a moulded surround, pilasters, a semicircular fanlight, and a bracketed hood. In the outer bays are full-height bow windows. The west front has a pedimented doorway, and to the west of the house is a lower service wing.	II
Lodge, Barlborough Hall; 53.29160°N 1.28719°W	—	Mid 19th century	The lodge at the southern entrance to the grounds of the hall is in sandstone, and in Tudor style. It has a stone slate roof with coped gables, moulded kneelers, and ball finials. There is a single storey, a T-shaped plan, and a front of three bays, the middle bay projecting and containing a canted bay window with a moulded cornice and blocking course. To the left is a two-light window, and to the right is a porch with a chamfered surround and a four-centred arched head. On the east front is another similar bay window.	II
Wall, railings and gate piers, Barlborough House; 53.28928°N 1.28616°W	—	19th century	The gate piers at the entrance to the drive are in sandstone. They are rusticated, and have moulded caps and banded ball finials. The flanking walls have chamfered copings and decorative iron railings.	II
Burial ground walls, Beightonfields Priory; 53.28538°N 1.31700°W	—	19th century	The walls enclosing the burial ground are in sandstone with chamfered copings. The enclosure is rectangular, and at the entrance on the south side are gate piers with moulded caps.	II
7 and 9 Church Street; 53.28925°N 1.28451°W	—	c. 1860	One of a pair of estate cottages in red brick with sandstone dressings and overhanging Welsh slate roofs. There are two storeys, and two bays. In the centre is a doorway with chamfered jambs, and the windows are casements with lattice glazing.	II
11 and 13 Church Street; 53.28917°N 1.28440°W	—	c. 1860	One of a pair of estate cottages in red brick with sandstone dressings and overhanging Welsh slate roofs. There are two storeys, and two bays. In the centre is a doorway with chamfered jambs, and the windows are casements with lattice glazing.	II
Gateway and wall, Memorial Gardens; 53.29043°N 1.28792°W		1869	The gateway and wall are in sandstone. The gateway has a chamfered four-centred arch with a keystone, a hood mould, and mosaic in the spandrels, and is flanked by stepped buttresses. The parapet contains a recessed decorative mosaic panel, it has a moulded base, and double-chamfered coping. In the arch is a pair of iron gates, and the flanking walls have double-chamfered coping and bead moulding.	II
Barlborough Infants School; 53.29106°N 1.28793°W		1870	The school is in red brick with sandstone dressings, quoins, a dentilled eaves cornice, and a Welsh slate roof with coped gables, moulded kneelers, and ball and spearhead finials. There is an H-shaped plan, and a south front of seven bays, the middle three bays projecting and gabled. Some windows are mullioned and transomed and in the centre range are four gabled dormers on each side. On the west front is a lean-to verandah.	II
