= Peter Heathfield =

British trade unionist (1929–2010)

Peter Heathfield (2 March 1929 – 4 May 2010) was a British trade unionist who was general secretary of the National Union of Mineworkers (NUM) between 1984 and 1992, including the period of the miners' strike of 1984/85.

He was born in Somercotes, near Alfreton in Derbyshire, moving to Chesterfield with his family as a child. After leaving school he worked in a colliery drawing office, before starting underground work at the Williamthorpe coal mine. He became active in the North Derbyshire region of the NUM, and the local Labour Party, and attended education courses at Sheffield University's extramural department. He also became a local councillor in Chesterfield, and unsuccessfully sought nomination as a Labour candidate in the 1964 General Election for Ilkeston.

In 1966, he was elected to a full-time post in the NUM, rising to become vice-president of the Derbyshire NUM in 1970 and Derbyshire area secretary in 1973. Although tipped to become national president of the NUM in 1981, he stood aside to support the younger Arthur Scargill as the left-wing candidate.

In January 1984, he was elected general secretary of the NUM, taking over the post in March, five days before the strike began. He backed Scargill's handling throughout the dispute, retiring from the position of general secretary in 1992.

== Personal life ==
He was married to Betty Heathfield, but they separated in 1989 and later divorced. He remarried in 2001.

== Death ==
Peter Heathfield died in 2010, aged 81. He was survived by his second wife and his four children from his first marriage.

Trade union offices
Preceded by Herbert Parkin	General Secretary of the Derbyshire Area of the National Union of Mineworkers; 1973–1984	Succeeded by Gordon Butler
Preceded by Lawrence Daly	General Secretary of the National Union of Mineworkers; 1984–1992	Succeeded by Arthur Scargill
