= Listed buildings in Staveley, Derbyshire =

Staveley is a civil parish in the Borough of Chesterfield in Derbyshire, England. The parish contains 26 listed buildings that are recorded in the National Heritage List for England. Of these, two are listed at Grade II*, the middle of the three grades, and the others are at Grade II, the lowest grade. The parish contains the town of Staveley, the village of Barrow Hill, and the surrounding area. Most of the listed buildings are houses and associated structures, farmhouses and farm buildings. The other listed buildings include churches and a cross in a churchyard, schools, a railway engine shed and a war memorial.

== Key ==
Grade	Criteria
II*	Particularly important buildings of more than special interest
II	Buildings of national importance and special interest

== Buildings ==
Name and location	Photograph	Date	Notes	Grade
St John the Baptist's Church; 53.26907°N 1.35138°W		13th century	The church has been altered and enlarged over the centuries, and in 1864–66 George Gilbert Scott added the north aisle and rebuilt other parts of the church. It is built in stone, mainly gritstone, and has a slate roof. The church consists of a nave with a clerestory, north and south aisles, a south porch, a chancel with a south aisle, and a west tower. The tower is the oldest part, and has four stages, angle buttresses, a southwest clasping buttress containing the stair turret, and a 13th-century west doorway. Above are lancet windows, a clock face on the south side, two-light bell openings, and an embattled parapet with corner pinnacles.	II*
Churchyard cross 53.26889°N 1.35144°W	—	Medieval	The cross base in the churchyard of St John the Baptist's Church has been restored. It is plain and stands on steps.	II
The Chantry; 53.26854°N 1.35253°W	—	Medieval	A chapel or chantry that has been much altered retaining massive internal timbering, it is in stone with a stone slab roof. There are two storeys with the gable end facing the street, and to the right is a wing with one storey and an attic containing a gabled dormer. The windows are sashes.	II
Staveley Hall; 53.26939°N 1.35093°W		1604	A manor house that has been much altered, leaving only its west wing, and a parallel wing to the east that was rebuilt in the 18th century. The house, later offices, is in stone with stone slate roofs. The east front consists of a block with three storeys and three bays, and a wing to the right with two storeys and four bays. On the main block is a projecting porch with a dated coat of arms. The west, garden, front has two storeys and five bays, and contains the older material. On the front is a two-storey canted bay window with a parapet. The windows are mullioned and transomed in rusticated architraves, with alternating segmental and triangular pediments and rustication in the tympani.	II
The Hagge; 53.28428°N 1.38361°W	—	1630	A large stone house on a plinth, with a slate roof and coped gables. There are three storeys, attics and a basement. Steps led up to a central three-storey projecting square porch, flanked by gabled bays, and there are three gabled bays at the rear. The windows are mullioned with two or three lights.	II*
Garden walls, The Hagge; 53.28396°N 1.38351°W	—	1630	The walls are in stone and enclose the garden to the south of the house. Facing the porch of the house, they contain an arched gateway.	II
11 Netherthorpe; 53.26696°N 1.33971°W	—	17th century	A stone house that has a slate roof with coped gables. There are two storeys, and the windows are mullioned with two lights.	II
Former stables and coach house, Staveley Hall; 53.26982°N 1.35095°W		17th century	The former stables and coach house are in stone with quoins and hipped stone slate roofs. The coach house has two storeys, and contains a doorway with a segmental head and a keystone. The stable ranges extend to the right and to the rear, and have a single storey. The buildings contain various openings.	II
Farm buildings, The Hagge; 53.28446°N 1.38297°W	—	17th century	The oldest range of farm buildings is at right angles to the house, and more were added later. They are in stone, most have old tile roofs, some have pantiles, and the gables are coped. The buildings have one or two storeys, and in the oldest range are mullioned windows with hood moulds.	II
Netherthorpe School; 53.26722°N 1.33936°W		1697	The original part of the school is in stone on a plinth, with quoins and a stone slab roof. There is a single storey, and it contains three mullioned and transomed windows. To the left is a projecting two-storey porch with a coped gable. This contains a round-headed doorway with archivolt bands and a hood mould, above which is a two-light mullioned window with a hood mould, and in the gable apex is a sundial.	II
7 and 8 Church Street; 53.26864°N 1.35101°W		1719	Originally a rectory, altered in about 1820, and later used for other purposes. It is roughcast at the front and in brick at the rear, and has a parapet and coped gables. There are two storeys and attics, and five bays, the centre bay recessed, and the outer pairs of bays project under gables. The central doorway has a square fanlight, and the windows are sashes with Gothic glazing and hood moulds. There is an initialled and dated rainwater head.	II
Poplar Farmhouse; 53.24346°N 1.33857°W	—	Late 18th to early 19th century	The farmhouse is in stone and has a slate roof with coped gables. There are two storeys and three bays. In the centre is a round-arched doorway with a traceried fanlight, and the windows are sashes.	II
Ringwood Hall and coach house 53.25854°N 1.38220°W	—	c. 1809	A house that was later extended and converted into a hotel. It is in stone with a hipped slate roof and two storeys. The main block has five bays, the middle bay slightly projecting. On the front is a porte cochère with paired Ionic columns, a moulded cornice and a blocking course with acroteria. On the east side and part of the south side is a continuous loggia of paired Ionic columns, and the windows are sashes with moulded architraves. To the right is a block with nine bays, the middle three bays projecting, and further to the right is the former coach house. This has three bays, the middle bay with three storeys and a pediment containing a clock face, over which is a tower with a pyramidal roof and a weathervane. This bay contains a segmental-arch with a keystone.	II
Inkersall Farmhouse; 53.24953°N 1.35770°W	—	Early 19th century	The farmhouse is in stone with an eaves cornice and a hipped slate roof. There are two storeys and three bays. In the centre is a doorway with pilasters, a semicircular radial fanlight, and an open pediment. The windows are sashes with rusticated lintels.	II
The School; 53.26894°N 1.35224°W		1844	The former school is in stone with slate roofs. In the centre is the schoolmaster's house, with two storeys, quoins and an octagonal plan. The projecting porch has a round-arched entrance, pilasters, and an open pediment containing a crest. The windows are sashes, in the ground floor with flat heads, and in the upper floor with round-arched heads. Linked to this by porch ways are two classroom ranges at right angles with overhanging eaves on brackets, containing Venetian windows.	II
34 and 36 High Street; 53.26832°N 1.35236°W	—	c. 1845	A pair of mirror-image houses in stone, with overhanging eaves and a hipped slate roof. There are two storeys and six bays, the middle two bays projecting under a gable. In the middle two bays are recessed doorways, and the windows are casements; all the openings have wedge lintels.	II
38 and 40 High Street; 53.26847°N 1.35220°W	—	c. 1845	A pair of mirror-image houses in stone, with overhanging eaves and a hipped slate roof. There are two storeys and six bays, the middle two bays projecting under a gable. In the middle two bays are recessed doorways, and the windows are casements; all the openings have wedge lintels.	II
42 and 44 High Street; 53.26860°N 1.35207°W	—	c. 1845	A pair of stone houses with a slate roof and overhanging eaves. There are two storeys and two bays, and on the front are casement windows. In each gable end is a gabled porch, with round-headed windows at the sides and above.	II
Cavendish Place; 53.27286°N 1.37535°W	—	c. 1845	A terrace of three houses with hipped Welsh slate roofs, outbuildings and a wall, all in sandstone. The houses have two storeys, and a symmetrical E-shaped plan with a front range of six bays, and three rear wings. They are on a plinth, and at the front is a floor band and an eaves band. At the ends are full height canted bay windows with a moulded cornice, and between them and elsewhere are sash windows. In the right return is a semicircular-headed doorway with a fanlight. At the rear are coped dividing and boundary walls, and at the northeast is a two-storey outbuilding with an upper floor doorway.	II
St Peter's Church; 53.26610°N 1.32505°W		1849	The church, replacing an earlier chapel on the site, is in sandstone with a slate roof. It consists of a nave and a semi-octagonal chancel, with a bellcote on the west gable, and is in Early English style. The windows are lancets, and at the west end is a doorway with a pointed arch, a double chamfered surround, and a hood mould.	II
Norbriggs House; 53.27154°N 1.32851°W	—	c. 1850	The house is in red brick on a plinth, with moulded stone eaves and a blocking course, and a hipped slate roof. There are two storeys and three bays, the middle bay slightly projecting. In the centre is a round-arched doorway with a fanlight, and the windows are sashes.	II
Barrow Hill Primary School; 53.27409°N 1.37356°W		1853–56	The school is in sandstone, it has roofs of Welsh slate with coped gables, and is in Gothic style. It consists of a central part with an entrance steeple, and a tall five-bay hall, behind which are classroom wings, forming an irregular L-shaped plan. The hall contains mullioned and transomed windows, and string courses stepped to form hood moulds. The steeple has a tower with two stages, stepped buttresses, an embattled parapet with crocketed corner pinnacles, and an octagonal spire with two tiers of lucarnes.	II
Ebenezer Row; 53.26782°N 1.35181°W		1860	A row of eleven workers' cottages in red brick with a slate roof. There are two storeys and attics, and each cottage has a single bay. In the centre is a passageway with an inscribed and dated stone arch. Each cottage has a protecting gabled porch with a round-arched window. The windows are sashes, those in the lower floors have wedge lintels, and in the attics are dormers with round-arched windows and lintels.	II
Roundhouse engine shed 53.27449°N 1.38175°W		1869–70	The engine shed and associated buildings were built by the Midland Railway. The engine shed has an iron frame, it is clad in brick and has a partly glazed roof. There is a rectangular plan, and it contains a turntable and service pits. The ancillary buildings are in brick with Welsh slate roofs, and include the general office at the east corner of the engine shed. Elsewhere, there is a sand dryer, consisting of a tower over a kiln, a workshop with a water tower, a mess and lamp shed, a machine shop with a louvred roof, and a sander unit.	II
Staveley War Memorial; 53.26904°N 1.34891°W		1920	The war memorial is in the Remembrance Gardens, and it consists of a sculpture in white marble depicting a soldier standing and holding a rifle. This is on a tall square marble plinth with a moulded cap, on a concrete base of three steps. On the plinth are inscriptions and the names of those lost in the two World Wars.	II
Garden walls, Staveley Hall; 53.26967°N 1.35278°W	—	Undated	The stone walls extend down a slope and enclose the garden. On the side facing the river, they form a massive retaining wall with buttresses.	II
