= Joe Lievesley =

English footballer (1883-1941)

Personal information
- Full name: Joseph Lievesley
- Date of birth: 25 July 1883
- Place of birth: Netherthorpe, Derbyshire, England
- Date of death: 13 October 1941 (aged 58)
- Place of death: Rossington, England
- Height: 5 ft 10 in (1.78 m)
- Position: Goalkeeper

Senior career*
| Years | Team | Apps | (Gls) |
| 1901–1913 | Sheffield United | 278 | (0) |
| 1913–1915 | Woolwich Arsenal | 73 | (0) |
| 1915–1917 | Chesterfield Town | | |
| 1917–1921 | Rossington Colliery | | |
- * Club domestic league appearances and goals

Joseph Lievesley (25 July 1883 – 13 October 1941) was a footballer who played as a goalkeeper. Born in Netherthorpe, England he spent the bulk of his career at Sheffield United for whom he made over 280 competitive appearances in twelve years. After leaving the Blades he moved to Woolwich Arsenal where he played regularly for two seasons. During World War I he played for Chesterfield Town until the club was disbanded in 1917, before returning to amateur football to play for Rossington Colliery until his retirement. He came from a family of footballers, with an uncle, two brothers and three children all playing the game professionally.

== Career ==
=== Club career ===
A miner by trade, Lievesley was playing for the Ireland Colliery side in Poolsbrook, Derbyshire when he was spotted by Sheffield United. He signed an amateur contract with the club in 1901 and played regularly in the reserves for three seasons before turning professional in 1903. Lieversley didn't make his competitive first team debut until September 1904 but soon became the side's first choice keeper, supplanting the legendary William Foulke. A consistent performer and rarely troubled by injuries he missed only six competitive games between November 1904 and December 1911, at one point playing 130 consecutive league and cup games.

At a time when very few were awarded, Lievesley saved nine penalty kicks whilst with United, including two in one game against Manchester City in 1906. After being a regular for eight seasons Lieversley was eventually replaced by Joe Mitchell and, after picking up an injury against Everton in what would be his last game in October 1912, he was given a free transfer to Woolwich Arsenal at the end of the 1912–13 season.

Despite his injury problems of the previous season Lievesley was virtually ever–present for the Gunners and missed only three out of 76 league games in two seasons. Following the outbreak of World War I he returned north to play for Chesterfield Town until it was closed down by the FA for making illegal payments to players. After the end of the War Lievesley returned to his job as a miner and played for the Rossington Colliery side until retiring from football in 1921.

=== International career ===
Lievesley played (and saved a penalty) in an England trial game in 1910 but was never selected for the full side. He did represent the Football League on one occasion and played on an FA tour of South Africa in 1911.

== Personal life ==
Lievesley was the nephew of Sheffield United full–back Harry Lilley. His brothers Fred and Wilf were also professional footballers, as were three of his sons; Leslie, Dennis and Ernest. Lievesley's first child was born during his time at Woolwich Arsenal but died in infancy, an event that contributed to his decision to return to the north of England. Another of his children contracted tuberculosis and died in 1941, desperate to save him Lievesley attempted mouth–to–mouth resuscitation only to contract the disease himself, dying a short time later.

A miner by trade, Lievesley served in the Royal Flying Corps during World War I, and as a good cricketer, he also played for Sheffield United Cricket Club during the summer months.
