= Herbert Parkin =

British trade unionist and politician

Herbert Edward Parkin (14 August 1908 – 1998) was a British trade unionist and politician.

Born in Waingroves in Derbyshire, Parkin left school aged fourteen to work at the Hartshay Colliery. This pit closed in 1931, but he found work at New Langley Colliery. There, he opposed the introduction of subcontracting, known as the "butty" system, and as a result became active in the Derbyshire Miners' Association (DMA).

In 1937, Parkin was elected as checkweighman at New Langley, and also to the local branch committee of the DMA. From 1941, he was the pit's delegate to the DMA council. He also became active in the Labour Party and was elected to Heanor Urban District Council in 1946. In 1948, he became president of his local DMA branch, and from 1951, he was vice-chair of Heanor UDC.

Parkin was elected as vice-president of the reconstituted Derbyshire Area of the National Union of Mineworkers in 1951. The following year, the post of president became open, and he won the election, serving until 1966, when he took over as the union's general secretary, serving until his retirement in 1973.

Trade union offices
| Preceded by J. Boam | Vice-President of the Derbyshire Area of the National Union of Mineworkers; 1951–1952 | Succeeded by J. Patilla |
| Preceded by Samuel Greenough | President of the Derbyshire Area of the National Union of Mineworkers; 1952–1966 | Succeeded by Dennis Skinner |
| Preceded by Bert Wynn | General Secretary of the Derbyshire Area of the National Union of Mineworkers; 1966–1973 | Succeeded by Peter Heathfield |
