= Joseph Lynch (trade unionist) =

British trade unionist

Joseph Lynch (29 December 1883 - 1972) was a British trade unionist.

== Early life and education ==
Born in New Whittington in Derbyshire, to Michael Lynch, a Coal Miner from Clashmore, County Waterford, Ireland and Mary Ann (Lavender). Lynch studied economics at Ruskin College and Nottingham University College, and sat the commerce examinations of the Royal Society of Arts, coming in first place, and the National Union of Teachers, where he took second place.

== Career ==
In 1912, he was employed by the Derbyshire Miners' Association (DMA) as its first clerk. While in this post, he wrote Business Methods and Accountancy in Trade Unions, which became an important text for the trade union movement, was also an active member of the Labour Party in Chesterfield, and also won a place on the union's executive.

In 1928, Lynch stood for election as treasurer of the DMA against eleven other candidates, including Samuel Sales. In contrast to almost all other office-holders in mining trade unions, he never worked as a coal miner himself. He complained that, during the election, he was falsely accused of being a member of the Conservative Party and of misusing his office to circulate an election address, and he was narrowly defeated by Oliver Wright. However, when Wright died in 1938, Lynch defeated twelve other candidates, including Sales and Harold Neal, to win the post.

Harry Hicken, general secretary of the DMA, resigned in 1942, and the executive posts in the union were rearranged. Lynch was appointed as the new general and financial secretary without an election being held. During his period of office, the union became the Derbyshire Area of the National Union of Mineworkers. He retired in 1947. He died in Chesterfield in 1972.

Trade union offices
Preceded by Oliver Wright	Treasurer of the Derbyshire Miners' Association; 1938 – 1942	Succeeded by Joseph Kitts
Preceded by Harry Hicken	General Secretary of the Derbyshire Miners' Association; 1942 – 1947	Succeeded by Bert Wynn
