= Wilfred Lievesley =

English footballer

Personal information
- Date of birth: 6 October 1902
- Place of birth: Netherthorpe, England
- Date of death: 21 February 1979 (aged 76)
- Place of death: Staveley, England
- Position: Forward

Senior career*
| Years | Team | Apps | (Gls) |
| 1920–1922 | Derby County | 1 | (0) |
| 1922–1923 | Manchester United | 2 | (0) |
| 1923–1928 | Exeter City | 97 | (38) |
| 1928–1929 | Wigan Borough | 26 | (13) |
| 1929–1930 | Cardiff City | 3 | (0) |
| 1930–1931 | Macclesfield | 26 | (20) |
| Total | | 155 | (71) |
- * Club domestic league appearances and goals

Wilfred Lievesley (6 October 1902 – 21 February 1979) was an English footballer. His regular position was as a forward. He was born in Netherthorpe, Derbyshire. He played for Derby County, Manchester United, Exeter City, Wigan Borough and Cardiff City.

His cousin Leslie Lievesley was also a footballer; he was later first-team coach of Torino and was killed in the Superga air disaster in 1949.
