= Barlborough =

Village in Derbyshire, England

Coordinates: 53.287°N 1.287°W

- Village and civil parish
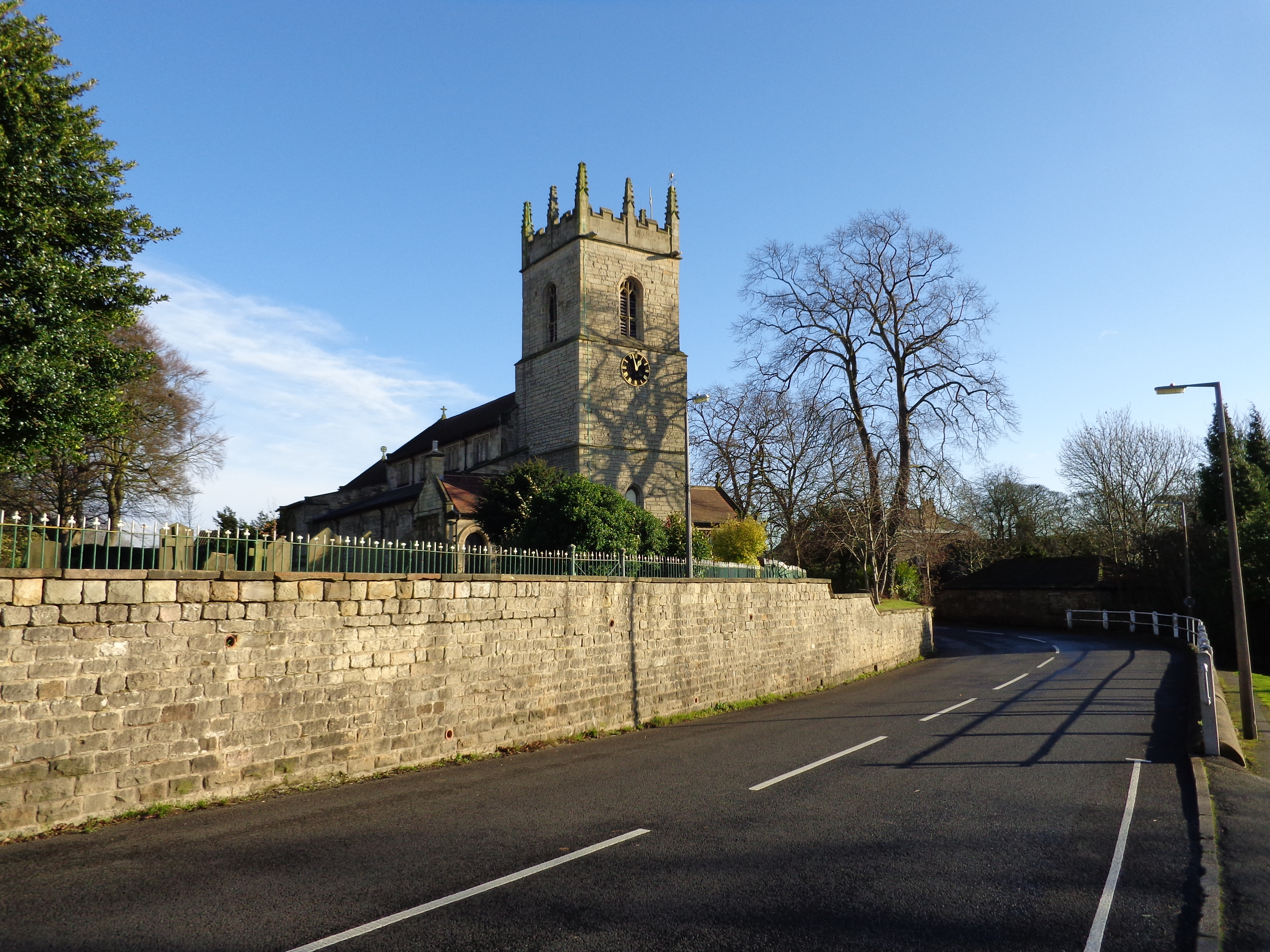
- St James the Great Church

- Barlborough parish highlighted within Derbyshire
- Population: 2,855 (2021)
- OS grid reference: SK476769
- District: Bolsover
- Shire county: Derbyshire
- Region: East Midlands
- Country: England
- Sovereign state: United Kingdom
- Post town: CHESTERFIELD
- Postcode district: S43
- Police: Derbyshire
- Fire: Derbyshire
- Ambulance: East Midlands
- UK Parliament: Bolsover
- Website: https://www.barlboroughparishcouncil.gov.uk/

Barlborough is a village and civil parish in the Bolsover district of Derbyshire, England.

== Geography ==
According to the 2021 census it had a population of 2,855. The village is near junction 30 of the M1 motorway and is about 5 miles (8.0 km) north of Bolsover.

=== Coal ===
At Newman Spinney, an underground gasification plant opened on 22 May 1950, after experiments in 1949. Other experiments were at Bayton in Worcestershire.

== Education ==
Barlborough has two primary schools, one public and one private.

== Transport ==
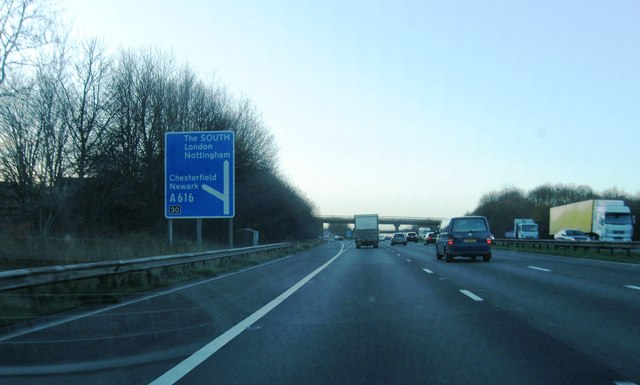
Barlborough M1 junction in November 2011, before adaptation to all-lane running

The second main section of the M1 was the Crick to Barlborough section. The Pinxton to Barlborough section was built by John Laing Construction Ltd, which was to open in late August 1967, being moved to early October 1967, and lastly to late October 1967. There had been mining subsidence. Construction began in August 1965. The section opened on Wednesday 25 October 1967. The section had cost £12.5m, and was two months late. Two days later on Friday 27 October 1967, the four miles of the M1 motorway from Stourton to East Ardsley, to the north, opened.

The section to the north, towards the Thurcroft Interchange was built by Tarmac Civil Engineering, which included the Woodall services nearby to the north, on the county boundary, which opened in summer 1968. This section was opened on the afternoon of 21 December 1967 by Stephen Swingler. The M18 motorway opened the same day.

== Notable residents ==
- Francis Rodes (c. 1530–1588), a judge who took part in the trial of Mary, Queen of Scots, he built Barlborough Hall c. 1583-84.
- John Osborne (1940–1998), football goalkeeper, played 367 games including 250 for West Bromwich Albion.
- Anne Western (born 1955), politician, leader of Derbyshire County Council in 2013, represented Barlborough and Clowne.

== See also ==
- Listed buildings in Barlborough
