= John Normansell =

British trade unionist

John Normansell (December 1830 – 24 December 1875) was a British trade unionist.

Born in Torkington, Stockport, Normansell was orphaned at an early age, and all his three siblings died while young, Normansell being brought up by his grandparents and an aunt. He became a surface worker at a coal mine at the age of seven, and moved to work underground when he was fourteen. When he married, at the age of twenty-two, he was illiterate, but his wife could read and write and persuaded him to learn.

Shortly after his marriage, Normansell moved to Derbyshire, then on to Silkstone in South Yorkshire, where in 1857 he was elected as checkweighman. This was unusual, as at most mines at the time, checkweighman was a position appointed by the owner. The following year, he was a founding member of the South Yorkshire Miners' Association (SYMA), which proved immediately successful. In 1863, Normansell fell into dispute with the owner of his mine, who sacked him, but the union supported him and, after seven months out of work, he won a court case for his reinstatement.

A nineteen-week-long lock-out of miners in 1864 greatly weakened the SYMA, membership fell, and the union sought a new secretary. Normansell took up the post, working with his assistant, Philip Casey, and within ten years, membership had increased tenfold to more than 20,000. Normansell became a nationally prominent leader of the miners, attending the first few annual Trades Union Congresses, and organising an important annual miners' gala. He first stood for election to Barnsley Town Council as a Liberal-Labour representative in 1871, and was successful the following year, the first worker to win election to the council.

From 1874, a recession led to a decline in the mining industry. Normansell recommended that SYMA members accepted wage reductions, which proved highly controversial. He was also accused of poor management of the union's finances, and decided to offer his resignation, but the union's executive convinced him to remain. He died at the end of the year, aged only 45.

Trade union offices
Preceded by Richard Mitchell	General Secretary of the South Yorkshire Miners' Association; 1864 – 1875	Succeeded by John Frith
