= Oliver Wright (trade unionist) =

Oliver Walter Wright (1881 – 21 January 1938) was an English trade unionist and political activist.

Born in Swanwick in Derbyshire, Wright began working in a coal mine at the age of nine. He later worked for the Butterley Company, and in 1920 was elected as lodge secretary for the Derbyshire Miners' Association (DMA), and as a delegate to its council. He stood for the Labour Party in Belper at the 1922 general election. Unusually, he was nominated by the local Labour Party, but later acquired the sponsorship of the DMA after it failed to agree an alternative candidate. He was not elected and, although he stood again in 1923, his vote fell. He was nominated again as a candidate for the 1924 general election, but given his poor performance, decided it wise to withdraw and instead back another candidate - he hoped Hugh Dalton would stand, although ultimately he did not. Following this, Wright decided to restand as the DMA nominee, but lost the nomination to Jack Lees.

Wright then devoted his time to the union. He was appointed as one of its trustees, and in 1928 beat eleven other candidates, including Joseph Lynch and Samuel Sales, to become the DMA's treasurer. He served in the post for ten years, but he suffered from poor health and had to take frequent absences due to illness. He died, still in office, in 1938.

Trade union offices
| Preceded by Harry Hicken | Treasurer of the Derbyshire Miners' Association; 1928 – 1938 | Succeeded by Joseph Lynch |
