= Rodes baronets =

Extinct baronetcy in the Baronetage of England

Arms of Rodes: Argent, a lion passant gules between two acorns in bend azure cotised ermines, ref.

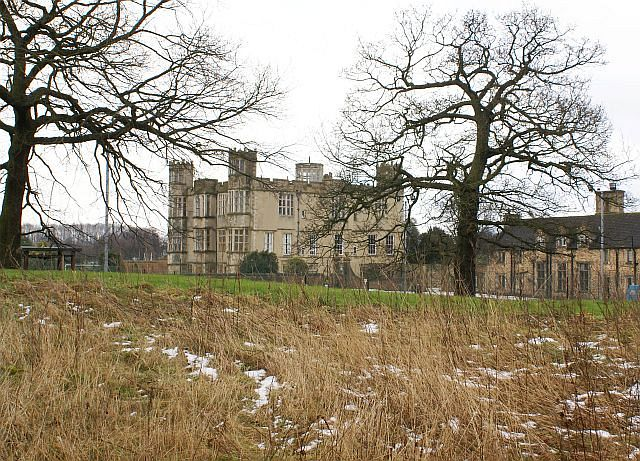
Barlborough Hall, the seat of the Rodes family

The Rodes Baronetcy, of Barlborough in the County of Derby, was a title in the Baronetage of England. It was created on 14 August 1641 for Francis Rodes, of Barlborough Hall, near Chesterfield, Derbyshire. The early family of Rodes was seated in Nottinghamshire. A William Rodes acquired an estate in Derbyshire by marriage. Sir Francis Rodes built Barlborough Hall in 1583–4. The first Baronet was his grandson. The title became extinct on the death of the fourth Baronet in 1743, when the estates passed to his sister's heirs, the Heathcotes and Heathcote-Rodes families.

== Rodes baronets, of Barlborough (1641) ==
- Sir Francis Rodes, 1st Baronet (1595–1646)
- Sir Francis Rodes, 2nd Baronet (died 1651)
- Sir Francis Rodes, 3rd Baronet (1648–1675), High Sheriff of Nottinghamshire in 1670
- Sir John Rodes, 4th Baronet (1670–1743)
