= Bert Wynn =

English trade unionist

Herbert William Wynn (12 September 1901 – 22 February 1966) was an English trade unionist and politician.

Wynn left school at the age of thirteen to work at the Moorgreen Colliery. He was a prominent activist during the 1926 UK General Strike, but was subsequently victimised and had to leave Nottinghamshire. In 1927, he found work at the Coppice Colliery, where he was soon elected as checkweighman. He was also active in the Labour Party, and served on Derbyshire County Council for three years from 1927, while also chairing Heanor District Labour Party, and being vice-president of the Ilkeston Divisional Labour Party.

Wynn objected to Ramsay MacDonald's policies and, in protest, he resigned from Labour in 1929 and joined the Communist Party of Great Britain (CPGB). He subsequently became chair of both the CPGB's Chesterfield area, and its East Midlands district.

During World War II, Wynn was prominent in the "Aid to Russia" campaign, and this raised his profile in the Derbyshire Miners' Association (DMA). He won election to its executive in 1942, beating Harold Neal. The following year, he won the post of treasurer of the DMA, then in 1947 he became general secretary of the reconstituted Derbyshire Area of the National Union of Mineworkers.

By the mid-1950s, Wynn had become disillusioned with the CPGB, and he resigned from the party in 1956, following the Soviet invasion of Hungary. He rejoined the Labour Party, and served as secretary of the Derbyshire miners until his death in 1966.

Trade union offices
Preceded by Joseph Kitts	Treasurer of the Derbyshire Miners' Association; 1943–1947	Succeeded by Hugo Street
Preceded by Joseph Lynch	General Secretary of the Derbyshire Area of the National Union of Mineworkers; 1947–1966	Succeeded by Herbert Parkin
