= Hugo Street =

British trades unionist

Hugo Street (1901–?) was an English trade unionist.

Born in Church Gresley in Derbyshire, Street worked at the Warsop Main Colliery from an early age. He joined the Nottinghamshire Miners' Association in 1916 and became branch secretary in 1927. In this role, he persuaded other members and management not to form a branch of George Alfred Spencer's rival Nottinghamshire and District Miners' Industrial Union.

Despite working in Nottinghamshire, Street lived in Shirebrook in Derbyshire, and was active in the Labour Party there. He served on Shirebrook Parish Council and later Derbyshire County Council, also serving as president of Shirebrook Trades Council.

In 1941, Street was elected to the council of the Derbyshire Miners' Association (DMA). He became president of the union in 1943, surprisingly defeating sitting president Samuel Sales. In 1947, he moved to become treasurer of the reconstituted Derbyshire Area of the National Union of Mineworkers, serving until his retirement in 1966.

Trade union offices
Preceded by Samuel Sales	President of the Derbyshire Miners' Association; 1943–1946	Succeeded by Samuel Greenough
Preceded by Bert Wynn	Treasurer of the Derbyshire Area of the National Union of Mineworkers; 1947–1966	Succeeded by Herbert Dilks
