= New Whittington =

Village in Derbyshire, England

Coordinates: 53.275°N 1.406°W

- Location within Derbyshire
- Population: 5,903 (2011 Census: ward)
- District: Chesterfield
- Shire county: Derbyshire
- Region: East Midlands
- Country: England
- Sovereign state: United Kingdom
- Post town: CHESTERFIELD
- Postcode district: S43
- Dialling code: 01246
- Police: Derbyshire
- Fire: Derbyshire
- Ambulance: East Midlands

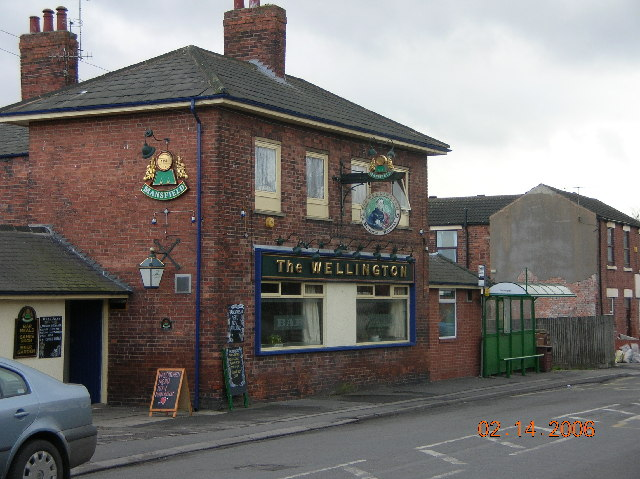
Wellington Inn, in New Whittington

New Whittington is a village located in the Borough of Chesterfield, in Derbyshire, England, near to Whittington Moor and Old Whittington. It is also to the west of Barrow Hill and Staveley. In 2011 the Barrow Hill and New Whittington ward had a population of 5,903.

There are also five pubs/clubs in New Whittington: The Wellington (closed), The Miners Arms, The Rising Sun, New Whittington Social Club and The Forge.

Revolution House, now a museum, is located between New and Old Whittington.

== St Barnabas Church ==
The village is served by St. Barnabas Church.

== Notable people ==
Joseph Lynch (1883-1972) - Trade unionist

== Connection with Hamburger SV ==
The village is the home of a UK-based Hamburger Sport Verein supporters club.

== See also ==
Whittington railway station
