= Enoch Overton =

British trade unionist

Enoch Overton (born 1864) was a British trade unionist.

Born in Wrockwardine in Shropshire, Overton worked as a coal miner from an early age. He moved to Bolsover as one of the first miners there, as the colliery was opening. He was soon elected as checkweighman, and was a founder member of Bolsover Urban District Council. He also sat on the Board of Guardians, and in 1919 was appointed as a magistrate.

In 1919, Overton was elected as vice-president of the Derbyshire Miners' Association (DMA). The union nominated him as a Labour Party candidate for both the Clay Cross and North East Derbyshire constituencies at the 1922 general election, but he refused to stand in either seat. He succeeded William Sewell as president in 1925, serving until his retirement at the end of 1938.

Trade union offices
Preceded by John Samuel Spencer	Vice-President of the Derbyshire Miners' Association; 1918–1924	Succeeded by Samuel Sales
Preceded by William Sewell	President of the Derbyshire Miners' Association; 1924–1939	Succeeded by Samuel Sales
