= Philip Casey (trade unionist) =

British trade unionist

- Born: 22 February 1835; Worsbrough, Barnsley, England
- Occupation: Trade unionist

Philip Casey (born 22 February 1835) was a British trade unionist.

Born in Worsbrough Common, Casey was educated at the National and Catholic schools in Barnsley. In 1864, he became assistant secretary of the South Yorkshire Miners' Association (SYMA), and with secretary John Normansell, they increased its membership to 20,000. He additionally served as secretary of the Miners' National Union, to which the SYMA was affiliated. In 1871, he was elected to the Barnsley School Board, and in 1874 he served as an auditor of the Trades Union Congress. The SYMA purchased the Shirland Colliery Company, and he became its manager in 1875, leaving trade unionism, but the venture was unsuccessful, and dissolved the following year.

Trade union offices
Preceded by John Worrall	Secretary of the Miners' National Union c.1870–1875	Succeeded by Thomas Halliday
Preceded by Henry Broadhurst and Peter Shorrocks	Auditor of the Trades Union Congress; 1874; With: Henry Broadhurst (1874)	Succeeded by Brown and Shipton
