= Barlborough Hall =

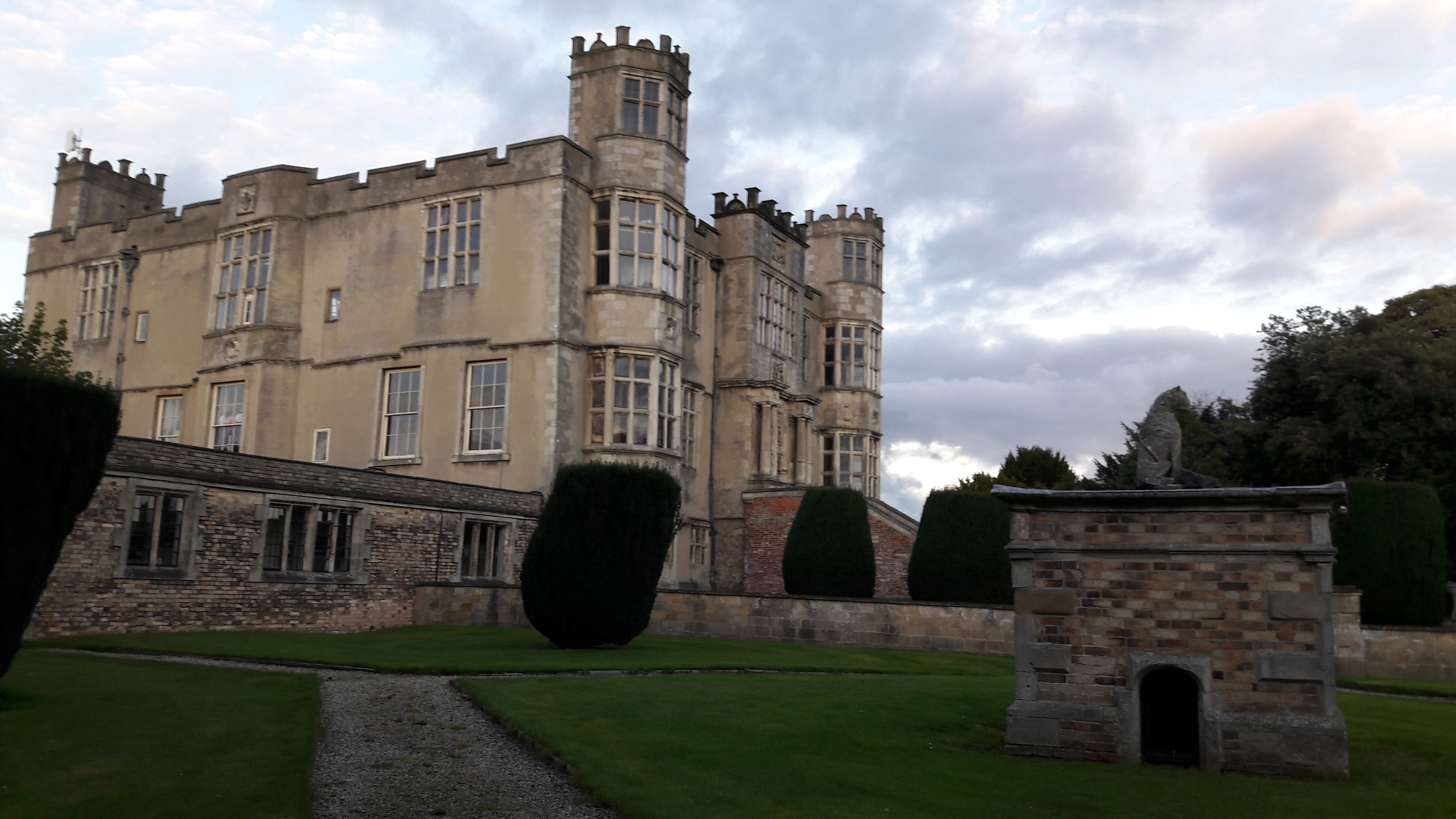
- Barlborough Hall

Quick reference
Location within Derbyshire
53°17′57″N 1°16′58″W
Type	Prodigy house
Location	Barlborough, Derbyshire
History
Built	c. 1583-84
Built for	Sir Francis Rodes
Site notes
Architect	Robert Smythson
Architectural style	Elizabethan
Owner	Mount St Mary's
Website	msmcollege.com/prep
Listed Building – Grade I
Official name	Barlborough Hall
Designated	19 November 1951
Reference no.	1108972
Listed Building – Grade II*
Official name	Gazebo at Barlborough Hall
Designated	23 March 1989
Reference no.	1367143
National Register of Historic Parks and Gardens
Official name	Barlborough Hall
Designated	4 August 1984
Reference no.	1001365

Barlborough Hall is a Grade I listed 16th-century country house in Barlborough, Chesterfield, Derbyshire, England. It was built around 1583-84 for Sir Francis Rodes and is attributed to Robert Smythson.

== History of the house ==
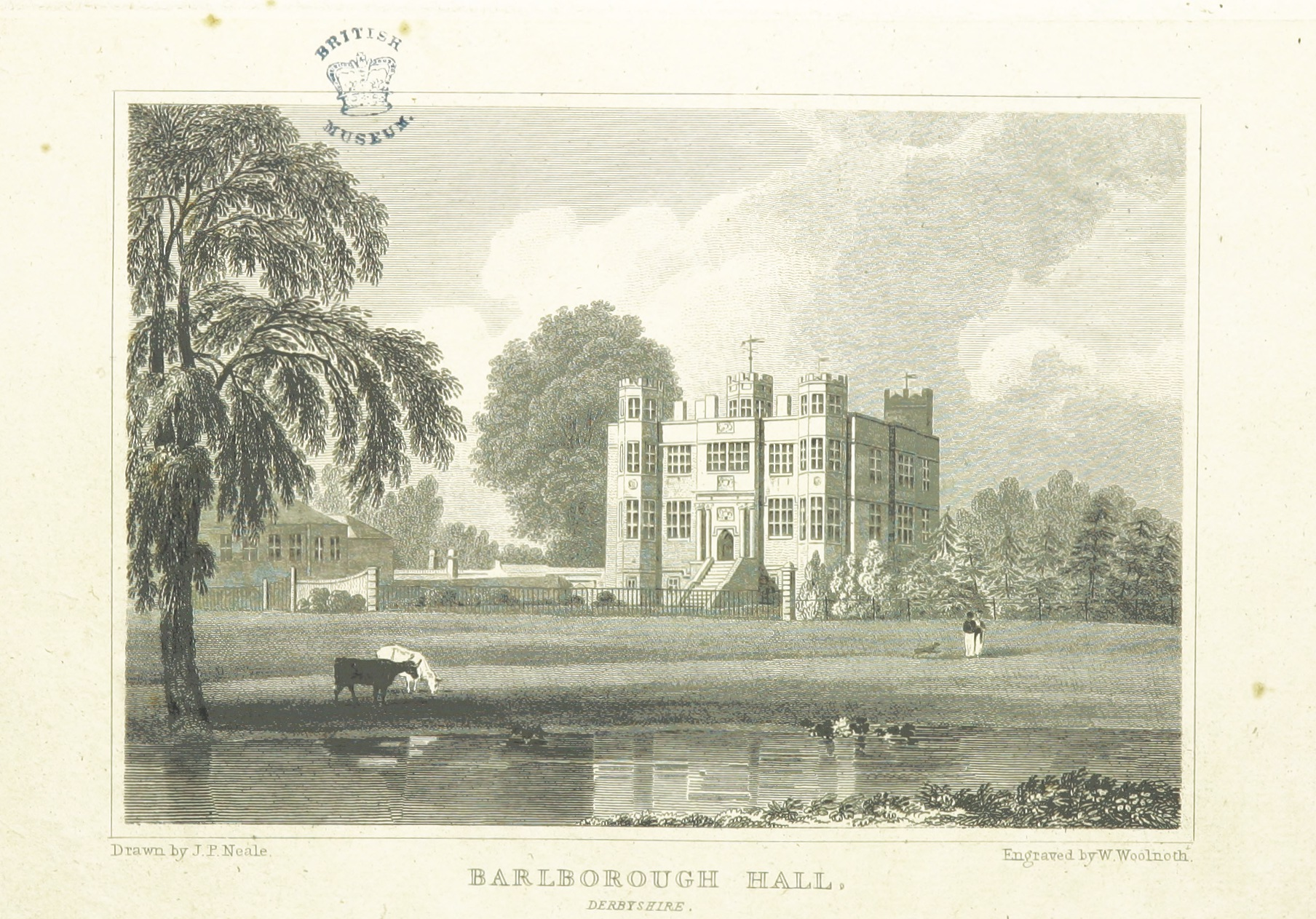
1818 picture of Barlborough Hall

The house was commissioned by Sir Francis Rodes and built around 1583-84, evidenced by the date 1583 on the porch and 1584 on the Great Chamber chimneypiece and is probably by Robert Smythson, designer of several of the most famous Elizabethan houses, who worked with Sir Francis's patron, the wealthy Earl of Shrewsbury.

It was the seat of the Rodes baronets until their extinction in 1743 on the death of the fourth baronet, Sir John Rodes. Sir John made alterations to the house in 1696 and 1713. It then passed to the Hatfield and Heathcote families, whose members took the Rodes surname and altered the house further in the 19th century. It remained in the family until 1935, when it was sold, before being sold again to the Jesuits of Mount St Mary's College in 1938.

A gazebo nearby was built in the 17th century and is Grade II* listed, whilst the gatepiers and former stables are Grade II listed. The house sits in parkland which is Grade II listed on the National Register of Historic Parks and Gardens.

== Barlborough Hall School ==
Barlborough Hall School
- Barlborough, Derbyshire, S43 4TJ; England

Information
- Type: Private day school
- Religious affiliation: Roman Catholic
- Established: 1842; 1939, the school itself
- Founder: Fr Baines
- Status: Closed
- Closed: 2025
- Gender: Co-educational
- Age: 3 to 11
- Houses: Campion, Loyola & Xavier
- Colours: Red, Blue & Yellow
- Senior School: Mount St Mary's College

Barlborough Hall School was founded as an independent Catholic day school around 1939 by the Jesuits who had purchased the house in 1938. The school was the Preparatory school for Mount St Mary's College at Spinkhill, 2.2 miles down the road. In 2025, along with Mount St Mary's College, the school closed because of financial difficulties.

== See also ==
- Grade I listed buildings in Derbyshire
- Listed buildings in Barlborough
- List of Jesuit sites in the United Kingdom
- List of Jesuit schools

== Exterior ==
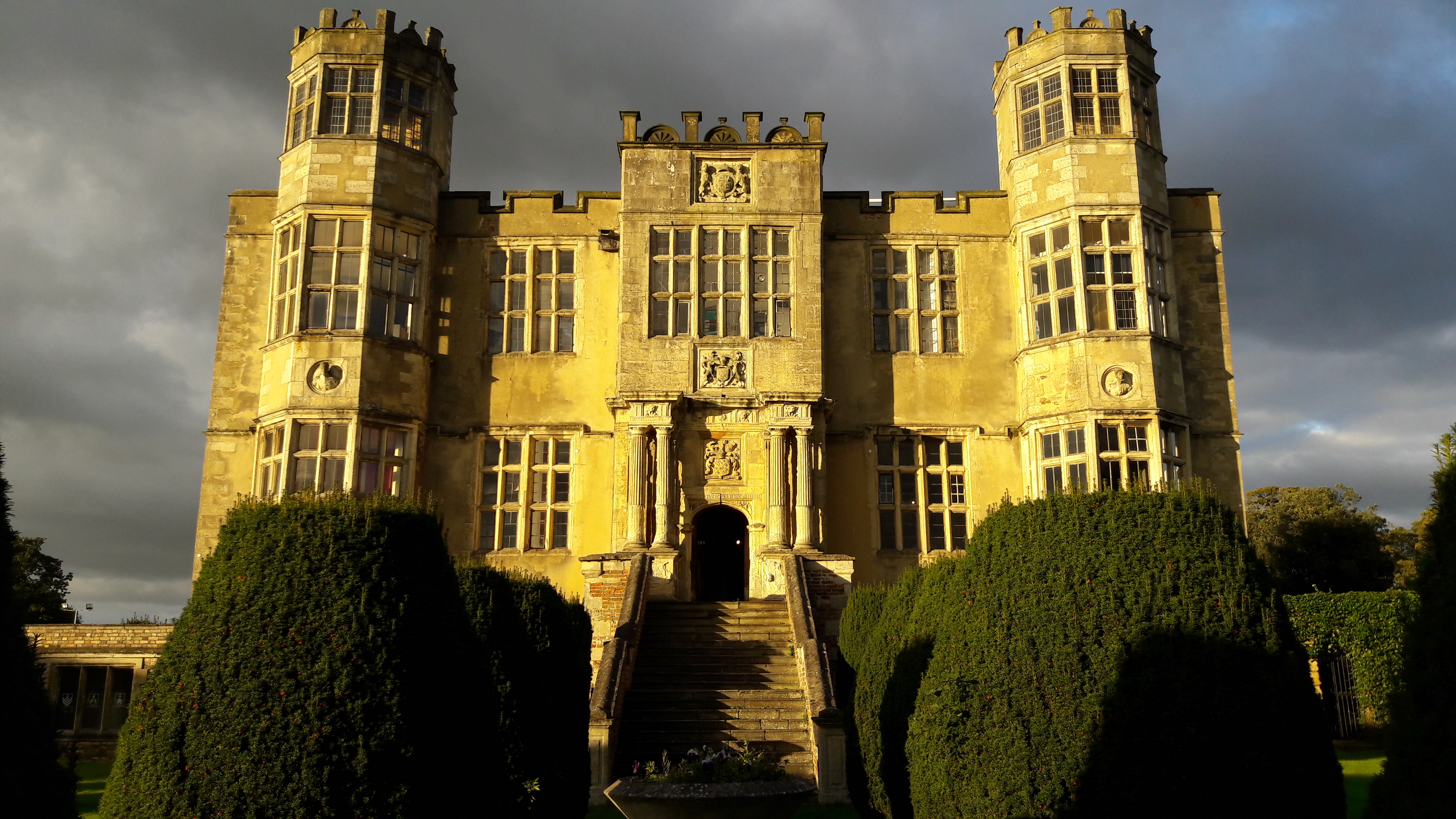
School front

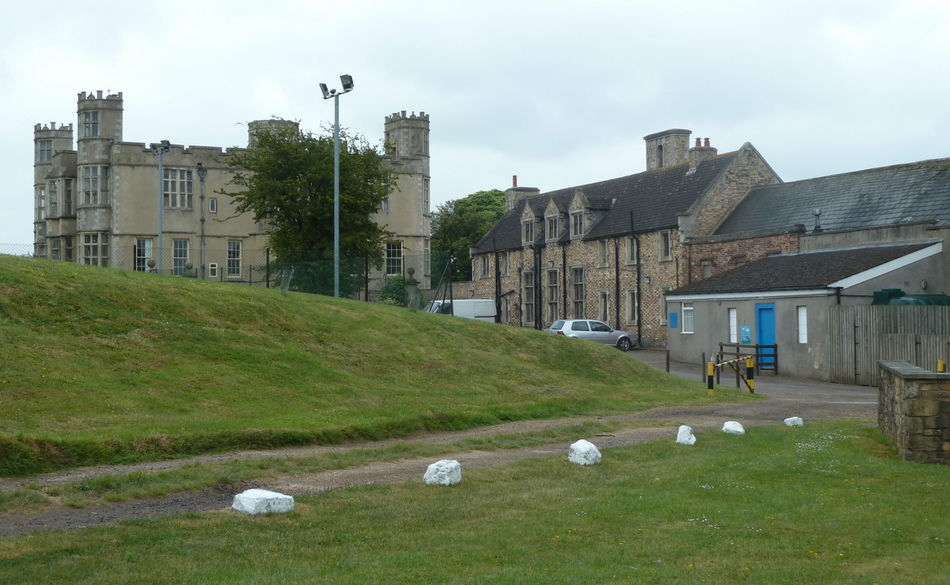
Surrounding buildings

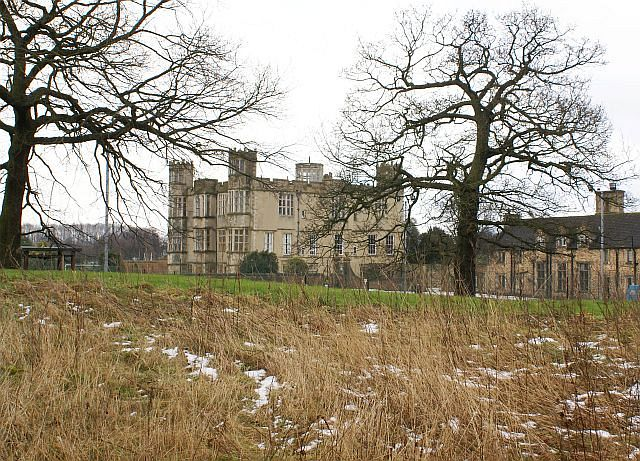
School grounds
