= Leslie Lievesley =

English footballer (1911–1949)

Personal information
- Date of birth: 23 June 1911
- Place of birth: Staveley, Derbyshire, England
- Date of death: 4 May 1949 (aged 37)
- Place of death: Superga, Italy
- Height: 5 ft 11 in (1.80 m)
- Position: Full-back

Senior career*
Years	Team	Apps	(Gls)
192?-1929	Rossington Colliery		
1929–1931	Doncaster Rovers	66	(21)
1931–1932	Manchester United	?	(?)
1932-1933	Chesterfield	?	(?)
1933–1937	Torquay United	130	(3)
1937–1939	Crystal Palace	75	(3)

Managerial career
- 1945–1946: Heracles Almelo
- 1947–1948: Torino (youth team)
- 1948: Italy Olympic
- 1948–1949: Torino
- * Club domestic league appearances and goals

Leslie Lievesley (23 June 1911 – 4 May 1949) was an English football player and manager. During his playing career, his regular position was at full-back.

Born in Staveley, Derbyshire, Lievesley started his career as an amateur with Rossington Main Colliery, where his father Joe was playing at the time while working at the nearby coal mine, following spells at Sheffield United and Arsenal. Leslie moved to Doncaster Rovers in 1929. After scoring 21 goals in 66 games, he was signed by Manchester United, but played with them during one of their less successful eras, when they were a Football League Second Division side. He then went to Chesterfield in March 1933, spent four seasons at Torquay United and two at Crystal Palace.

Following the start of the Second World War in 1939, Lievesley joined the Royal Air Force, where he became a parachute trainer and dispatch officer.

Following the war he became a coach in the Netherlands at Heracles Almelo, then in 1947, after turning down an offer from Marseille in France, transferred to Italian club Torino as youth team coach. He coached the Italy national team at the 1948 Summer Olympics and became first-team coach at Torino that year. In 1949 he had been offered a contract to coach rival team Juventus, when on 4 May he was one of 31 fatalities in the Superga air disaster that killed almost the entire Torino squad when they were in the process of winning the Serie A title. He had previously survived two air crashes in the war and one in 1948 when travelling with the Torino youth team.

As well as his father, Joe, Lievesley's brothers Ernest, and Harold, and uncle Wilf were all professional footballers. His son, Bill, was a professional cyclist

== Honours ==
=== Manager ===
Torino

- Serie A: 1948–49

=== Individual ===
- Torino FC Hall of Fame: 2019
