= Harry Hicken =

English trade unionist

Henry Hicken (2 April 1882 – 20 September 1964) was an English trade unionist.

Born in North Wingfield in Derbyshire, Jarvis left school at the age of twelve to work at Pilsley Colliery, then moved to Parkhouse Colliery and Williamthorpe Colliery, where he was elected checkweighman and secretary of the local lodge of the Derbyshire Miners' Association (DMA). Initially a Methodist and a supporter of the Liberal Party, he became a Marxist atheist, and was known for never wearing a tie.

In 1920, Jarvis was elected as treasurer of the DMA. This was affiliated to the Miners' Federation of Great Britain (MFGB), and he stood unsuccessfully for the post of general secretary of the MFGB in 1924. However, in 1928, he was elected as general secretary of the DMA, also winning a seat on the executive of the MFGB. He stood repeatedly for other offices in the MFGB: vice-president in 1931, 1932 and 1934 and president in 1930 and 1939, but was never successful.

Hicken became Regional Labour Director for the Ministry of Fuel and Power in 1942 and offered to resign his DMA post. The DMA executive rejected his resignation, but branches held a vote which ousted him. Now a full-time civil servant, he joined the National Coal Board in 1947 and was made an Officer of the Order of the British Empire the following year. He retired in 1956 and died eight years later.

Trade union offices
Preceded by John Samuel Spencer	Treasurer of the Derbyshire Miners' Association; 1920 – 1928	Succeeded by Oliver Wright
Preceded by Frank Hall	General Secretary of the Derbyshire Miners' Association; 1928 – 1942	Succeeded by Joseph Lynch
