= William Hallam (trade unionist) =

British trade unionist

President of the Derbyshire Miners' Association
- In office 1890–1898
- Preceded by: R. P. Carter
- Succeeded by: Barnet Kenyon

Personal details
- Born: William Hallam; 1856 Coal Aston, Derbyshire
- Died: 4 July 1902 (aged 45–46) Staveley, Derbyshire

William Hallam (1856 – 4 July 1902) was a British trade unionist.

== Early life ==
Hallam was born in 1856 in Coal Aston to Thomas Hallam (1819-1896), a miner, and Anne Armstong (1823-1878). He married Mary Bramley in Chesterfield in 1873 and had four children, three sons, and a daughter.

== Life ==
Hallam came to prominence when he was elected as the checkweighman at Markham Colliery in Derbyshire in 1883, and subsequently as the colliery's delegate to the new Derbyshire Miners' Association. He was elected as president of the DMA in 1890 and served until 1898, when he was narrowly defeated by Barnet Kenyon. While in office, he wrote Miners' Leaders: thirty portraits and biographical sketches, an important source of information on leading figures in miners' trade unions up to that point.

Hallam contested the presidency against Kenyon each year until his premature death in 1902, but was never successful. Unlike many of the other miners' leaders of this period Hallam was an Anglican. He was a member of the Stavely Parish Church choir and served as the clerk to Staveley Parish Council.

He died from a heart affection on the 4th of July 1902 at his Staveley home and was survived by his wife, three sons and daughter.

His Brother was the miner Elijah Hallam and he was a relative of the Mayor of Sheffield Joseph Hallam, JP

== Publications ==
Miners' Leaders: thirty portraits and biographical sketches 1894

Trade union offices
| Preceded by R. P. Carter | President of the Derbyshire Miners' Association; 1890 – 1898 | Succeeded by Barnet Kenyon |
