= Thurcroft Interchange =

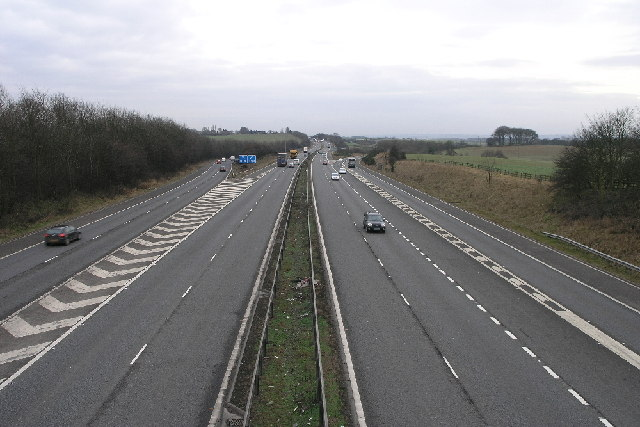
- Thurcroft Interchange from the southwest, along the M18, in February 2006; it is junction 32 of the M1
- Interactive map of Thurcroft Interchange

Location
- South Yorkshire
- Coordinates: 53.39°N 1.28°W
- Roads at junction: M1; M18

Construction
- Constructed: by W. & C. French (M18), Tarmac (M1 south), and Dowsett Engineering (M1 north and the Thurcroft Link)
- Opened: 21 December 1967
- Maintained by: National Highways

The Thurcroft Interchange is a large motorway junction in South Yorkshire (the Metropolitan Borough of Rotherham).

== History ==
=== M1 ===
Early designs for the M1 show the extension to Sheffield and Leeds at what is now the Aston Interchange (A57). The draft scheme for the 87 miles from Crick to Doncaster was first published on 8 January 1960, where the extension to Leeds was now north of the Aston Interchange; all the junctions shown are those that would be built. The route was fixed on 7 October 1960. The M1 north of Crick began construction in early August 1962. On 3 September 1962, the draft scheme for the 34-mile extension to Leeds was published; the section was known as the Sheffield-Leeds Motorway.

The contract for junction 31 to 34 for £5,979,680 was awarded to Dowsett Engineering (Construction) Ltd (Dow-Mac) on 16 June 1965. South of the interchange, the Barlborough to Thurcroft 7.2-mile £4.56m contract was awarded to Tarmac Civil Engineering Ltd in October 1965.

The M1 section west of the junction and the M1 section south of the junction to Barlborough opened on 21 December 1967.

=== M18 ===
On 26 January 1966, the £5,080,309 contract for an 8.5-mile section of the M18 was given to W. & C. French. At this time, 37 miles of the M1, north of Crick, were open to Kegworth Interchange (junction 24) from December 1965, and the M18 was expected to be built in two years. The northern part of the interchange was known as the Thurcroft Link or the Thurcroft Motorway Link.

The M18 section opened on 21 December 1967. The new section of the M1 from Barlborough to Thurcroft, and the M18, was 15.5 miles long.

The opening ceremony was at Barlborough, with Stephen Swingler. There were now 164 miles of the M1.

== Construction ==
Work began in mid-June 1965 for the 6.5-mile section between junction 31 at Aston and junction 34; it was the second section of the M1 in Yorkshire to be constructed, after the section from junctions 42-44 began in May 1965. It was planned to complete this section by the autumn of 1967. At this time, the main M1 was known as the Crick-Doncaster Motorway. Two hundred and seventy houses would be demolished near junction 34 of the M1. The design of the Sheffield-Leeds M1 extension, including the Thurcroft Interchange, was done by West Riding County Council; it did not design the M18. The prestressed concrete beams for the section of the M1 from junctions 31-34 were made by Dow-Mac at Tallington in Lincolnshire.

Work began in October 1965 for the section of the M1 from Barlborough to Thurcroft.

Work began in February 1966 for the M18 section north of the Thurcroft Interchange.

== Structure ==
The eastern part (M18) of the interchange is in Thurcroft, the western side (M1) is in Ulley, and the northern part (the main interconnecting slip roads) is in Whiston, South Yorkshire. The junction is barely one mile north of the Aston Interchange (A57, junction 31).
