= Solar Pyramid =

Proposed sculpture in the United Kingdom

The Solar Pyramid was a proposed sculpture originally scheduled to open in June 2003 in the United Kingdom. The pyramid was to have been the UK's largest sculpture, the world's biggest functioning timepiece, and the world's largest sundial. The sculpture, originally planned for a site in Derbyshire, and later one in Dorset, failed to attract sufficient finance or public support to be constructed.

The design consisted of three towers, or gnomons, which leaned together to create an illusion of a pyramid.

== Design ==
According to the project's website the pyramid was to comprise "three highly polished stainless steel leaning blade-like towers, which cast a shadow onto an enormous elliptical sundial base, telling the date and time". The towers would not meet at the apex, but create "a shifting illusion of a pyramidal structure".

The towers were to be clad in "reflective, mirror polished and green-coloured, stainless steel" to reflect light and capture movement. One tower was to have "a locational latitude of 53.25 degrees and is orientated due south to function in a similar, but more scientifically sophisticated manner, to that of the gnomon of an immense sundial". The tower would cast a shadow on a sixty-metre elliptical base. The remaining towers were to be aligned to the extremes of sunrise and sunset.

== Derbyshire site ==
In 2002, it was announced that construction of the 40-metre-high (130 ft) sculpture, designed by Richard Swain and Adam Walkden would be commenced at Poolsbrook, near Chesterfield, Derbyshire. A scale model of the sculpture was exhibited at the Royal Observatory Greenwich. The site, near the M1 Motorway, was to be visible to 45,000 motorists an hour. Completion was expected by June 2003. Eventually, work on the foundations commenced in January 2004, and it was announced that it was expected to have the sculpture in place by the time of the Autumn Equinox on 22 September of that year. By December 2005, there was little progress, with a completion date of Summer 2006 given.

By September 2007, work had still not started, mainly due to financial problems. It was hoped that construction would finally begin in Spring of the following year, with completion about nine months later. However, in November 2007, the Derbyshire site was abandoned. Instead, it was decided to build a 58-metre-high (190 ft) sculpture near Poole in Dorset.

== "Moments in Time" ==
In February 2006, the Solar Pyramid website began the sale of "Moments in Time" to the public. For £49.75 the purchaser received a certificate of ownership of "a chosen one-minute slot at a date and time that carries special significance for them". A numbered plaque marking the minute would also be affixed to the floor of the planned sundial.

== Dorset site ==
Negotiations with Poole Borough Council began in November 2007. The project had the support of Poole Tourism Partnership. The scheme for the sculpture was opened to public consultation in December 2007, but the response was overwhelmingly negative. In January 2008, Poole Borough Council announced they would not be going ahead, partly due to "unanswered questions about adequate funding". The council's leader issued a statement explaining the decision:

"...no taxpayers' money will be invested in the delivery of this proposal and at this stage, Solar Pyramid Ltd has not been able to provide the necessary evidence of costs and funding for the Council to proceed with the assessment work with sufficient confidence. I will therefore be instructing the Council's Chief Executive to make arrangements to withdraw from discussions with Solar Pyramid Ltd."

All references to Poole were quickly removed from the project website.

== Winding up of company ==
According to documents lodged with the Registrar of Companies, the directors of the company resigned and an application for a voluntary striking off the register was made in June 2009. The final notice indicating that the company had been voluntarily dissolved appeared in the London Gazette in September 2009.
