= Netherthorpe, Derbyshire =

Area in Staveley, Derbyshire, UK

Coordinates: 53°16′9″N 1°20′54″W

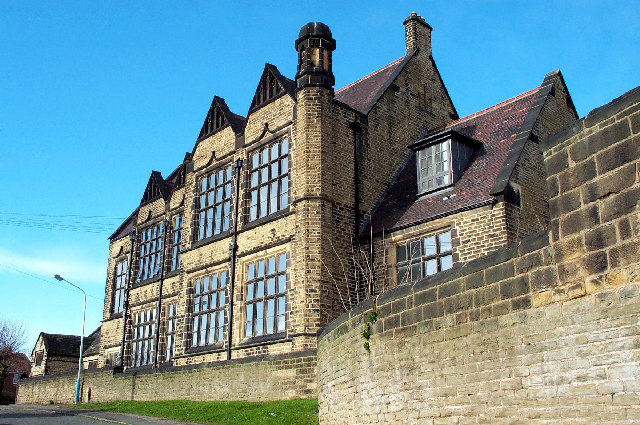
Netherthorpe School in 2002

Netherthorpe is a suburban area adjoining the town of Staveley, Derbyshire, to the east, lying just west of the River Doe Lea.

The village is best known for Staveley's oldest (1572) secondary school, Netherthorpe School.
