= Derbyshire Miners' Association =

Defunct United Kingdom trade union

- Founded: 1880
- Dissolved: 31 March 2015
- Headquarters: Saltergate, Chesterfield
- Location: United Kingdom
- Members: 36,087 (1907)
- Affiliations: Miners' Federation of Great Britain

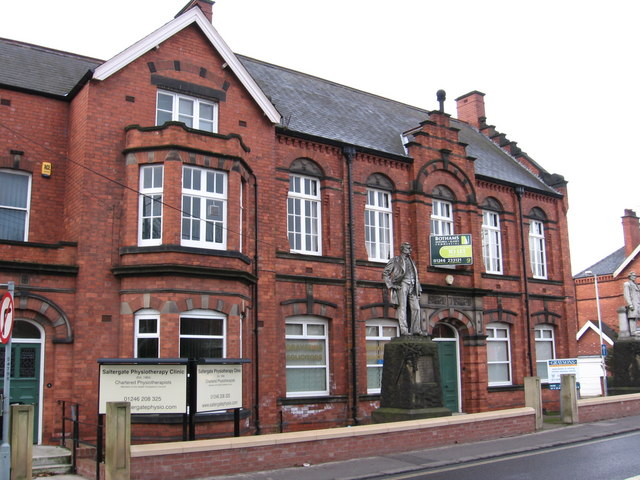
Former Derbyshire Miners' Association offices in Chesterfield

The Derbyshire Miners' Association was a trade union in the United Kingdom.

The union was founded in 1880 to represent coal miners in northern Derbyshire, as a split from the South Yorkshire Miners' Association. Although it initially aimed to recruit members from across the county, it only developed strength in the north Derbyshire coalfield, and the separate South Derbyshire Amalgamated Miners' Association was founded in 1883. An earlier Derbyshire and Nottinghamshire Miners' Association had been founded in the 1860s. By the end of that decade, when it had become moribund, remaining members in south Derbyshire split away to form their own district of the Miners' National Union.

In 1945, the union became the Derbyshire Area of the National Union of Mineworkers. This was dissolved in 2015, by which point it had only four members.

== Secretaries ==
1880: James Haslam
1913: W. E. Harvey
1914: Frank Hall
1928: Harry Hicken
1942: Joseph Lynch
1947: Bert Wynn
1966: Herbert Parkin
1973: Peter Heathfield
1984: Gordon Butler
1996: Austin Fairest

== Presidents ==
Barnet Kenyon

1880: Richard Bunting
1884: Henry Jarvis
1887: R. P. Carter
1890: William Hallam
1898: Barnet Kenyon
1906: James Martin
1918: William Sewell
1924: Enoch Overton
1939: Samuel Sales
1943: Hugo Street
1946: Samuel Greenough
1952: Herbert Parkin
1966: Dennis Skinner
1970:
1972: Raymond Ellis
1979: C. Hawley
1980s: Alan Gascoyne

== Vice-Presidents ==
1903: Frederick Bonsall
1904: James Martin
1906: Frederick Bonsall
1906: Frank Hall
1907: William Sewell
1918: John Samuel Spencer
1918: Enoch Overton
1924: Samuel Sales
1939: Henry White
1942: Harold Neal
1944: Samuel Greenough
1946: Michael Kane
1947: J. Boam
1951: Herbert Parkin
1952: J. Patilla
1954: F. Peacock
1950s: Tom Swain
1959: Stanley Mellors
1980s: Peter Elliott

== Treasurers ==
1880: William Edwin Harvey
1882: Joseph Windle
1887: Henry Jarvis
1907: Frank Hall
1914: Frank Lee
1918: John Samuel Spencer
1920: Harry Hicken
1928: Oliver Walter Wright
1938: Joseph Lynch
1942: Joseph Kitts
1943: Bert Wynn
1947: Hugo Street
1966: Herbert Dilks

== See also ==
- The Derbyshire Miners' Holiday Camp
