= South Yorkshire Miners' Association =

Former trade union of the United Kingdom

- Merged into: Yorkshire Miners' Association
- Founded: 1 April 1858
- Dissolved: 1 July 1881
- Headquarters: 2 Huddersfield Road, Barnsley
- Location: United Kingdom
- Affiliations: Miners' National Union

The South Yorkshire Miners' Association (SYMA) was an early British trade union representing coal miners in the southern West Riding of Yorkshire and northern Derbyshire.

The union was founded in 1858 at the White Bear Inn in Barnsley in response to a planned wage cut, with Richard Mitchell appointed a few weeks later as its secretary. Following the formation of the union, colliery owners agreed not to impose cuts, but at the Oaks Colliery, the owner refused to re-employ union members. Following a lengthy strike, they were taken back, although they had to draw lots with blackleg workers for the seams of coal they had been working. Several more disputes took place over the next few years, the most important in 1859 at Wharncliffe Silkstone Colliery, where workers succeeded in keeping an elected checkweighman, John Normansell.

The union took part in national conferences of miners in Leeds and Ashton-under-Lyne in 1858 and 1859, but these did not lead to any lasting national union. They did agree to send a delegation to Parliament, with Mitchell as its secretary, which succeeded in getting the Mines Regulation Act 1860 passed. This permitted all miners to demand that they elect a checkweighman, although in practice this right was rarely recognised by employers. The Miners' National Association was finally established in 1863, with the strong support of the SYMA, and with Mitchell as its secretary.

In 1864, miners at the Oaks went on strike, asking for a month's advance of wages. This was without the sanction of the union and they did not initially receive any union benefits. However, many other colliery owners feared that the demand would spread, and pre-empted this by locking out miners across the district. This lasted for nineteen weeks, during which Normansell took the lead in maintaining solidarity. At this point, the owners reopened their mines, re-employing the miners under their former pay and conditions, although the Oaks held out until December. This action was considered a success for the union, and membership rose to 2,279.

The SYMA was reorganised under the new leadership of Normansell, introducing standard procedures across all branches, and successfully promoting the election of checkweighmen across the district. With his assistant Philip Casey, they rebuilt membership to over 20,000, and began running annual South Yorkshire Miners' Galas. The union was also a prominent founder of the UK Association of Organised Trades, loaning it money on several occasions. Financial aid was frequently sent to other miners' unions involved in disputes, and local trade unions in other industries. In 1874, new offices were opened in Barnsley.

In 1860, miners at Brightside in Sheffield formed a union and, in November, joined the SYMA, as its first branch in the city. However, they were then victimised by their employer and the branch collapsed. It was only re-established in 1866, when miners in Tinsley also joined, the union prioritising bringing their working conditions up to the standards enjoyed in the rest of the district. This was fiercely resisted by some mineowners, and led to an eighteen-month strike in 1869/70 which spread across the district, with the union successful at some pits but entirely defeated at others.

The union long co-operated with the Derbyshire and Nottinghamshire Miners' Association, but this was largely defeated by 1868. As a result, the SYMA began building up branches in north Derbyshire. However, membership remained low in the district, and the SYMA leadership had little time to deal with disputes there, so little activity took place. In 1880, lodges in the county split away to form the new Derbyshire Miners' Association.

Wages increased rapidly during the early 1870s, but from 1874 coal prices began falling, and wages were cut. Normansell was criticised by some miners for not doing more to oppose this, and resigned in 1875 in protest. He was replaced by John Frith, who invested much of the SYMA's capital in the Shirland Colliery, but lost this when the pit went into liquidation in 1877. Soon after, most of its members in Derbyshire left to form the Derbyshire Miners' Association. The SYMA began negotiating a merger with the West Yorkshire Miners' Association; this was completed in 1881, forming the new Yorkshire Miners' Association.

== Secretaries ==
1858: Richard Mitchell
1864: John Normansell
1875: John Frith
