= Tin Town =

Tin Town may refer to:

- Birchinlee in Derbyshire, England
- Tin Town, Luton, a suburb of Luton, Bedfordshire, England
- Tin Town, Missouri, unincorporated community in Polk County, Missouri, United States
- Caruthersville, Missouri, town in Pemiscot County
- Tin Town, Napier, a temporary shopping centre built following New Zealand's 1931 Hawke's Bay earthquake
- Overslade, a suburb of Rugby, Warwickshire, England
