= East Derbyshire =

Parliamentary constituency in the United Kingdom, 1868–1885

- Former county constituency for the House of Commons

1868–1885
- Seats: two
- Created from: North Derbyshire
- Replaced by: Chesterfield and North East Derbyshire

East Derbyshire was a parliamentary constituency in Derbyshire which elected two Members of Parliament to the House of Commons of the Parliament of the United Kingdom.

It was created for the 1868 general election, and abolished only seventeen years later under the Redistribution of Seats Act 1885. It was then replaced by seven new constituencies: Chesterfield, Mid Derbyshire, North East Derbyshire, South Derbyshire, West Derbyshire, High Peak and Ilkeston.

== Boundaries ==
1868–1885: The Hundred of Scarsdale.

== Members of Parliament ==
Election	1st Member	1st Party	2nd Member	2nd Party
1868	Francis Egerton	Liberal	Henry Strutt	Liberal
1874	Francis Egerton	Liberal	Francis Arkwright	Conservative
1880	Francis Egerton	Liberal	Alfred Barnes	Liberal
1885	constituency abolished			

== Elections ==
=== Elections in the 1860s ===
General election 1868: East Derbyshire
Party	Candidate	Votes	%	±%
Liberal	Francis Egerton	2,089	25.8	
Liberal	Henry Strutt	2,032	25.1	
Conservative	William Gladwin Turbutt	1,999	24.7	
Conservative	William Overend	1,970	24.4	
Majority		33	0.4	
Turnout		4,045 (est)	79.2 (est)	
Registered electors		5,107		
Liberal win (new seat)				
Liberal win (new seat)				

=== Elections in the 1870s ===
General election 1874: East Derbyshire
Party	Candidate	Votes	%	±%
Liberal	Francis Egerton	2,206	26.2	+0.4
Conservative	Francis Arkwright	2,116	25.2	+0.5
Liberal	William Fowler	2,067	24.6	−0.5
Conservative	Henry Strutt	2,017	24.0	−0.4
Turnout		4,203 (est)	86.9 (est)	+7.7
Registered electors		4,836		
Majority		90	1.0	+0.6
Liberal hold		Swing	+0.4	
Majority		49	0.6	N/A
Conservative gain from Liberal		Swing	+0.5	

=== Elections in the 1880s ===
General election 1880: East Derbyshire
Party	Candidate	Votes	%	±%
Liberal	Alfred Barnes	3,119	28.2	+3.6
Liberal	Francis Egerton	3,063	27.7	+1.5
Conservative	Francis Arkwright	2,577	23.3	−1.9
Conservative	William Gladwin Turbutt	2,303	20.8	−3.2
Majority		542	4.9	N/A
Turnout		5,531 (est)	89.6 (est)	+2.7
Registered electors		6,173		
Liberal gain from Conservative		Swing	+2.8	
Liberal hold		Swing	+2.4	
