= List of wards in Rugby borough by population =

This is a guide to the size of the wards in Rugby borough.

== 2001 ==
This is based on the data from the 2001 UK Census. The entire population of the borough was 87,367.

Rank	Ward	Population
1	Benn	6,265
2	Newbold	5,996
3	New Bilton	5,689
4	Caldecott	5,595
5	Earl Craven and Wolston	5,552
6	Overslade	5,520
7	Dunchurch and Knightlow	5,432
8	Eastlands	5,381
9	Hillmorton	5,183
10	Bilton	4,991
11	Admirals	4,743
12	Brownsover South	4,147
13	Brownsover North	4,074
14	Paddox	3,714
15	Fosse	3,545
16	Lawford and King's Newnham	3,231
17	Avon and Swift	2,555
18	Wolvey	2,262
19	Leam Valley	1,820
20	Ryton-on-Dunsmore	1,672

== 2016 ==
This is based on UK National Statistics estimates of districts and wards as of December 2016. The total population of the borough was estimated at 103,815.

Rank	Ward	Population
1	New Bilton	8,608
2	Admirals and Cawston	8,492
3	Newbold and Brownsover	8,347
4	Benn	8,247
5	Eastlands	8,049
6	Rokeby and Overslade	7,809
7	Wolston and the Lawfords	7,600
8	Dunsmore	7,182
9	Coton and Boughton	6,878
10	Paddox	6,803
11	Revel and Binley Woods	6,426
12	Bilton	6,065
13	Hillmorton	5,454
14	Wolvey and Shilton	3,005
15	Clifton, Newton and Churchover	2,451
16	Leam Valley	2,399

N.B. Ward populations will differ from the village population which they are named after and which they are linked to as ward boundaries very rarely match village boundaries exactly.
