= Chesterfield by-election =

Chesterfield by-election may refer to:

- 1984 Chesterfield by-election
- 1913 Chesterfield by-election
