= James Haslam =

British politician

James Haslam MP
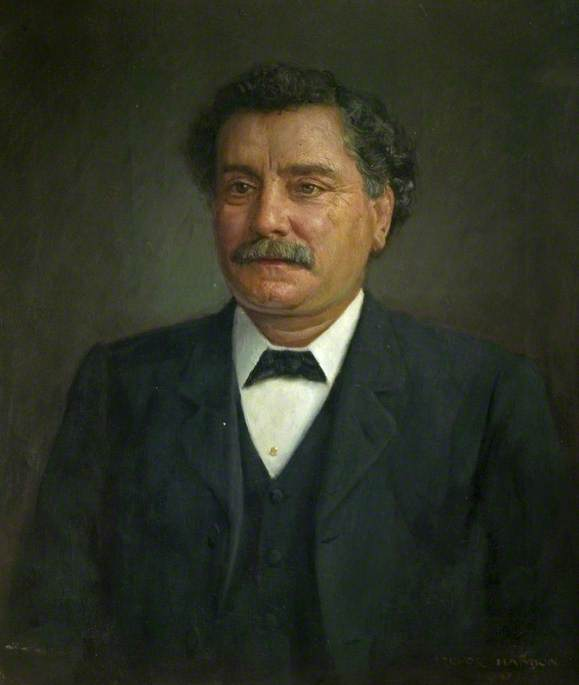

Member of Parliament for Chesterfield
- Preceded by: Thomas Bayley
- Succeeded by: Barnet Kenyon

James Haslam (1 April 1842 – 31 July 1913) was a British politician, representing Chesterfield as an MP from 1906 to 1913.

Before entering Parliament in 1906, Haslam had been a founder member and served as a leading official of the Derbyshire Miners’ Association (DMA) since its inception some 30 years earlier. He was returned in 1906 as a Liberal candidate, but won the two General Elections of 1910 as a Labour candidate.

He died in 1913 in Chesterfield aged 71.

He currently has a statue outside the former Miner's Offices on Saltergate at Chesterfield.

Parliament of the United Kingdom
Preceded by Thomas Bayley	Member of Parliament for Chesterfield; 1906–1913	Succeeded by Barnet Kenyon
Trade union offices
Preceded by New position	Secretary of the Derbyshire Miners' Association; 1881–1913	Succeeded by W. E. Harvey
Preceded by William Inskip and Will Thorne	Trades Union Congress representative to the American Federation of Labour; 1899; With: Alexander Wilkie	Succeeded by Pete Curran and John Weir
Preceded by David Shackleton	President of the Trades Union Congress; 1910	Succeeded by William Mullin
