= Francis Arkwright (politician) =

Member of the British gentry

The Honourable Francis Arkwright

Member of the New Zealand Legislative Council
- In office 13 December 1895 – 12 December 1902
- In office 13 December 1902 – 23 July 1906

Personal details
- Born: 17 March 1846
- Died: 1 March 1915 (aged 68)
- Spouse(s): Louisa Elizabeth Jane Milbank (m. 1868, d. 1873); Evelyn Addington Wells (m. 1875)
- Relations: Richard Arkwright (great-grandfather); Sir William Fitzherbert, 1st Baronet (great-grandfather); George Grey, 6th Earl of Stamford (first wife's grandfather); Arthur Duncombe (uncle)
- Occupation: politician

Francis Arkwright (17 March 1846 – 1 March 1915) belonged to the British gentry. His first wife died after giving birth to a daughter, and he remarried. Arkwright represented East Derbyshire in the British House of Commons from 1874 to 1880.

In 1882, the Arkwright family emigrated to New Zealand, where he commissioned a large country house on the Rangitikei River. Arkwright was a leading Freemason. He unsuccessfully stood for the Rangitikei electorate on two occasions; in the 1887 election and in the 1890 election. In 1895, he was appointed to the New Zealand Legislative Council. The family returned to live in England in 1906 and Arkwright died in 1915 at Bournemouth.

Arkwright owned several notable houses in both England and New Zealand. Of these, Overton in Marton is the most notable and is registered as Category I with Heritage New Zealand.

== Early life in England ==
Arkwright was born on 17 March 1846 and baptised on 13 April of that year in Mayfield, Staffordshire, England. His parents were The Reverend Godfrey Harry Arkwright (c. 1815–1866) and Frances Rafela Fitzherbert Arkwright (1823–1849). Richard Arkwright was his great-grandfather, and Sir William Fitzherbert, 1st Baronet was a maternal great-grandfather. His brother William Harry was born one year earlier. A sister Alice was three years younger; his mother died one week after giving birth to her. Arkwright was 16 when his father remarried. Through his stepmother, he had three more siblings; Marian, Godfrey Edward and Walter. His father died young when Francis Arkwright was only 20. William Harry became the vicar of St Mary's Church, Wirksworth in 1893 and held the position until 1902.

Arkwright was educated at Eton College.

On 2 June 1868, he married Louisa Elizabeth Jane Milbank, the daughter of Henry John Milbank and Lady Margaret Henrietta Maria Grey, at St Paul's Church, Knightsbridge in London. The Arkwrights had one daughter.

Arkwright owned Overton Hall in Derbyshire in 1873. Previously owned by Joseph Banks, Overton Hall became a Grade II* listed building in 1967. Arkwright purchased Coton House in Churchover, Warwickshire, in 1874 including the manorial rights and patronage. At Arkwright's death, the house passed to his nephew Bertram Arkwright (first son of William Harry Arkwright). Coton House was listed as a Grade II* listed building in 1951. Bertram Arkwright's second son was the cricketer Francis Arkwright (1905–1942).

In 1875, Arkwright married Evelyn Addington Wells; there were no children from this second marriage. In 1876, Arkwright was initiated as a Freemason at Scarsdale Lodge No.681.

Arkwright was Member of Parliament (MP) for East Derbyshire from 1874 to 1880.

== New Zealand ==
In 1882, Arkwright emigrated to New Zealand with his second wife and daughter from the first marriage. On 28 November, they arrived in Nelson on the Taiaroa. Francis Arkwright left for Wanganui on the steamer Wallace the next day, followed by his wife and daughter on 6 December on the steamer Murray. He was looking for new opportunities after he lost his seat in Parliament. Arkwright did not think that he would return to his native Derbyshire.

=== Overton, New Zealand ===
Arkwright bought land near Marton and commissioned the architects Frederick de Jersey Clere and Alfred Atkins to design a large country house near the Rangitikei River which he called Overton. The Tudor style building is unusual for its concrete panels between the timber framing; it was a very early application of concrete and de Jersey Clere went on to design many concrete churches. After he had commissioned the house, the family returned to England and came back in 1884 when the house was finished. The contract price was just over £2,500 for the large house. When Arkwright left New Zealand for good, he passed the house on to his nephew Henry Arkwright (third son of William Harry Arkwright). The house passed from the Arkwright family in 1987. In 1990, the building was registered by Heritage New Zealand as a Category I heritage item, with registration number 187.

=== Freemasonry ===
Arkwright was initiated into the Scarsdale Lodge No.681 EC on 21 June 1876, passed to the Fellow Craft Degree on 17 November and made a Master Mason on 6 December.

On 11 August 1884, Arkwright met with 11 other Freemasons at the White Hart Hotel Marton, New Zealand with the sole purpose of establishing a Freemason's Lodge in the township. At that meeting it was proposed that The Honorable Francis Arkwright take the chair as Worshipful Master if and when the Lodge was formed. In October a committee consisting of the following members was to draw up the by-laws to be submitted to the Brethren at a later date, they were Bro. Arkwright, Cash, Thompson, Macintosh and Edwards. The dedication of the Marton Ruapehu Lodge No. 2137 EC was carried out on 15 January 1885, at the Forester's Hall, Marton:

The 15th of January was a day of considerable interest to most of the good folks of this smart little township, but most especially of course to those residents who were members of the Fraternity, that being a day appointed for the opening of the Marton Ruapehu Lodge English Constitution. For the information of our readers we may mention that the town of Marton is situated in the Rangitikei District and is in the center of an excellent farming country distant from Wanganui by rail 32 miles. It is well laid out, and has a business look about it which is very pleasing, and gives it a well to do appearance. It has lately arranged for a permanent water supply which will be a great boom to the inhabitants, as previously there had been difficulty in not being able to find pumping supply by either driving or boring. On the morning in question it was easy to see that some special event was expected as one after another of the business places sent up bunting to flutter in the breeze, and when the train from Wanganui arrived, the Masonic contingent from there made the streets look quite lively in appearance. Masonically speaking Marton is in the district of Wellington and the District Grand Lodge Officers arrived via Palmerston North.

Arkwright was Master of the Lodge in 1884–85 and 1889 Arkwright was a Grand Steward.

In December 1893, Arkwright was installed as District Grand Master took place at the Masonic Hall in Wanganui.

Following some disturbance at the Forster Hall the New Lodge rooms in Wellington Road, Marton were built for one hundred and seventy five pounds and consecrated in 1894, R.W Bro Francis Arkwright was the consecrating officer.

In 1890 the newly formed Grand Lodge of New Zealand was established and many Lodges joined the constitution. In 1904 Marton Ruapehu Lodge No. 2137 EC joined and became The Ruapehu Lodge No.128 NZC.

=== Political career in New Zealand ===
Together with John Stevens and Robert Bruce, Arkwright was one of the three initial candidates in the 1884 election for the Rangitikei electorate. An editorial in the Feilding Star argued in early July that the liberal politician Stevens, the incumbent, would certainly win against the two others, as they were both conservatives and the vote would be split between them. One of the conservatives should thus withdraw from the contest, and the editor thought that Arkwright had the better chances. On the same day, Arkwright had a mixed reception at a meeting with electors at Halcombe. An amendment for a vote of confidence in Arkwright resulted in some dispute amongst the attendees. By mid July, Arkwright had withdrawn from the contest, and Bruce went on to defeat Stevens.

The 1887 election in the Rangitikei electorate was again contested by Bruce, Stevens and Arkwright, with Bruce obtaining the majority during the show of hands during the nomination meeting in Marton. In an address to electors at Bulls, Arkwright lectured on the benefits of free trade. Apparently, Arkwright was better received by the electors, but Stevens was seen as the favourite. In the end, Bruce obtained 716 votes, a considerable margin over the 492 votes for Stevens, with Arkwright coming a distant third at 213 votes.

The 1890 election in the Rangitikei electorate was contested by Arkwright and Douglas Hastings Macarthur, who had been the representative for the neighbouring Manawatu electorate since 1884. Both candidates were well received during meetings with the electors. The Feilding Star in an editorial suggested that there are more policy agreements between the candidates than differences, but endorsed Macarthur. In the end, Macarthur achieved a narrow victory, with 978 vs 946 votes, a majority of 32.

Arkwright was appointed to the New Zealand Legislative Council on 13 December 1895. At the end of the seven-year term, he was reappointed on 13 December 1902. He resigned from the Legislative Council on 23 July 1906.

== Return to England ==
The Arkwrights and their daughter left New Zealand via Wellington on 30 December 1905 to permanently reside in England. He resigned from the Legislative Council after he had returned to England. Apparently, he missed the hunting and shooting opportunities that were available to him in the 'Old Country', and he undertook yearly expeditions into the Scottish sporting districts. He died on 1 March 1915 at Bournemouth from pneumonia, survived by his wife and daughter.

== Notes ==
Parliament of the United Kingdom
Preceded by Francis Egerton and Henry Strutt	Member of Parliament for East Derbyshire; 1874–1880; With: Francis Egerton	Succeeded by Francis Egerton and Alfred Barnes
