= Eric Varley =

British politician and life peer (1932-2008)

The Right Honourable The Lord Varley PC
- Varley in 1965

Member of the House of Lords
- Lord Temporal
- Life peerage 30 May 1990 – 29 July 2008

Secretary of State for Industry
- In office 10 June 1975 – 4 May 1979
- Prime Minister: Harold Wilson; James Callaghan
- Preceded by: Tony Benn
- Succeeded by: Keith Joseph

Secretary of State for Energy
- In office 5 March 1974 – 10 June 1975
- Prime Minister: Harold Wilson
- Preceded by: The Lord Carrington
- Succeeded by: Tony Benn

Shadow Secretary of State for Employment
- In office 14 July 1979 – 31 October 1983
- Leader: James Callaghan; Michael Foot
- Preceded by: Jim Prior
- Succeeded by: John Smith

Shadow Secretary of State for Industry
- In office 4 May 1979 – 14 July 1979
- Leader: James Callaghan
- Preceded by: Keith Joseph
- Succeeded by: John Silkin

Member of Parliament for Chesterfield
- In office 15 October 1964 – 19 January 1984
- Preceded by: George Benson
- Succeeded by: Tony Benn

Personal details
- Born: Eric Graham Varley; 11 August 1932 Poolsbrook, Derbyshire, England
- Died: 29 July 2008 (aged 75) Chesterfield, Derbyshire, England
- Party: Labour
- Spouse: Marjorie Turner (m. 1955)
- Children: 1
- Education: Ruskin College

Eric Graham Varley, Baron Varley, PC (11 August 1932 – 29 July 2008) was a British Labour Party politician and cabinet minister on the right wing of the party. He was the Member of Parliament for Chesterfield from 1964 to 1984.

== Early life ==
Eric Graham Varley was born in Poolsbrook, Derbyshire, to Frank and Eva (née Goring) Varley. His father was a coalminer. He left school at the age of fourteen in 1946. His mother did not wish for him to follow his father's line of work, and he began an early career at the iron works before training as an engineer. He was an accomplished football player as a young man who played semi-professionally. He initially aspired to play professionally, and it was speculated that he could have done so. However, he decided to start a career in politics, partially at the behest of trade unionist Bert Wynn.

== Political career ==
Varley was active in the National Union of Mineworkers, and became a branch secretary of the union in 1955, joining the Labour Party the same year. After a period at Ruskin College, Varley won the NUM nomination to be the Labour candidate for his home town, where the sitting Labour Member of Parliament (MP) George Benson was retiring from Parliament. He was narrowly selected in June 1963 and duly held the Chesterfield seat in the 1964 election.

Despite rebelling against the government's application to join the Common Market in 1967, Varley became an Assistant Whip later that year, and Parliamentary Private Secretary to the Prime Minister Harold Wilson in November 1968. He served briefly as a junior minister under Tony Benn at the Ministry of Technology from 1969. During the Labour Party's period of opposition in the early 1970s, Varley was Chairman of the Trade Union Group of MPs, and became spokesman on fuel and power.

Varley was appointed Secretary of State for Energy when Labour returned to power in 1974, and was the cabinet's youngest member. The appointment of an NUM-sponsored MP helped the government end the NUM strike which had led the previous government to ration electricity to three days a week. Varley subsidised the National Coal Board and chose a British design for new nuclear power stations over an American rival. He also began the procedure to nationalise North Sea oil.

During the Common Market referendum he advocated a 'No' vote but was not prominent in the campaign. Immediately afterwards Wilson swapped Varley's and Benn's posts, so that Varley was effectively promoted to Secretary of State for Industry. In November 1976 Varley suffered an embarrassing public defeat when he determined to shut down the loss-making Chrysler car factory: the Cabinet forced him to increase its subsidy to keep it open. He continued the government's slow nationalisation programme by appointing Michael Edwardes to take over at British Leyland.

When Labour went into opposition in 1979, Varley was elected to the Shadow Cabinet in fifth place. He led Denis Healey's campaign for the party leadership in 1980 and defeated the left-winger Norman Atkinson for the post of party Treasurer (an office he had coveted for some years) in 1981. He served as opposition spokesman on employment, and resisted an attempt by Michael Foot to replace him with Neil Kinnock (whom he disliked) in 1982.

After Kinnock's election as party leader in 1983, Varley announced that he would retire from Parliament at the next general election. However, he ended up leaving before then, as he was appointed as Chairman of Coalite plc, a private company manufacturing coal-based products including a coke-like smokeless fuel of the same name. He resigned his seat in January 1984. Ironically, this opened the way for Tony Benn, a leading left-winger and rival of Varley, to return to the House of Commons as Varley's successor in the seat. Varley served five years at Coalite, until the company was acquired in 1989, and subsequently held other directorships, including as a regional director for Lloyds Bank. Following a Labour Party nomination, he was created a life peer on 30 May 1990 taking the title Baron Varley, of Chesterfield in the County of Derbyshire.

== Personal life ==
In 1955, Varley married Marjorie Turner, and they had one son.

Varley was a Methodist. He lived in Walton, Chesterfield, and was known for maintaining an elaborate garden at his home. He died from cancer at his residence on 29 July 2008, at the age of 75.

Parliament of the United Kingdom
Preceded by George Benson	Member of Parliament for Chesterfield; 1964–1984	Succeeded by Tony Benn
Political offices
Preceded by The Lord Carrington	Secretary of State for Energy; 1974–1975	Succeeded by Tony Benn
Preceded by Tony Benn	Secretary of State for Industry; 1975–1979	Succeeded by Sir Keith Joseph, Bt
Party political offices
Preceded by Norman Atkinson	Treasurer of the Labour Party; 1981–1983	Succeeded by Albert Booth
