= Luton Corporation Tramways =

Defunct tram system in Luton, England (1908–1932)

Coordinates: 51.8796°N 0.4175°W

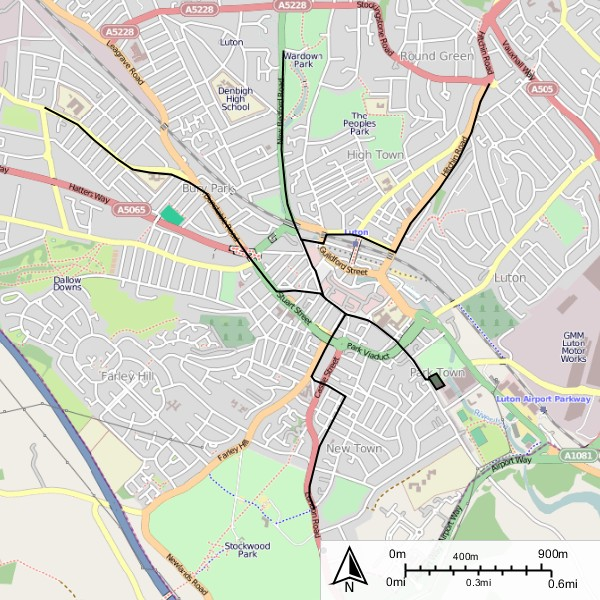
- Map of Luton Corporation Tramways

Operation
- Locale: Luton
- Open: 21 February 1908
- Close: 16 April 1932
- Status: Closed

Infrastructure
- Track gauge: 4 ft 8 1/2 in (1,435 mm)
- Propulsion system: Electric

Statistics
- Route length: 5.25 miles (8.45 km)

Luton Corporation Tramways served the town of Luton in Bedfordshire from 21 February 1908 until 16 April 1932.

== History ==
In 1904, Luton Corporation applied for a provisional order under the Tramways Act 1870 (33 & 34 Vict. c. 78), and this was confirmed and granted as the Luton Corporation Tramways Order 1905, and confirmed by the Tramways Orders Confirmation (No. 2) Act 1905 (5 Edw. 7. c. cxciv). The corporation issued out the work to competitive tender, and the contract was secured by White & Co on 19 March 1907.

The tramway was constructed in 4½ months, work beginning on 7 October 1907. The total cost, including the 12 tramcars, was £63,000 (equivalent to £6,550,000 in 2025).

The official inauguration took place on 23 February 1908. In 1909 the lease transferred to Balfour, Beatty and Co., and Luton Corporation took over the running of the system some years later.

In 1925, the tramways made a profit of £2,000 (equivalent to £105,000 in 2025).

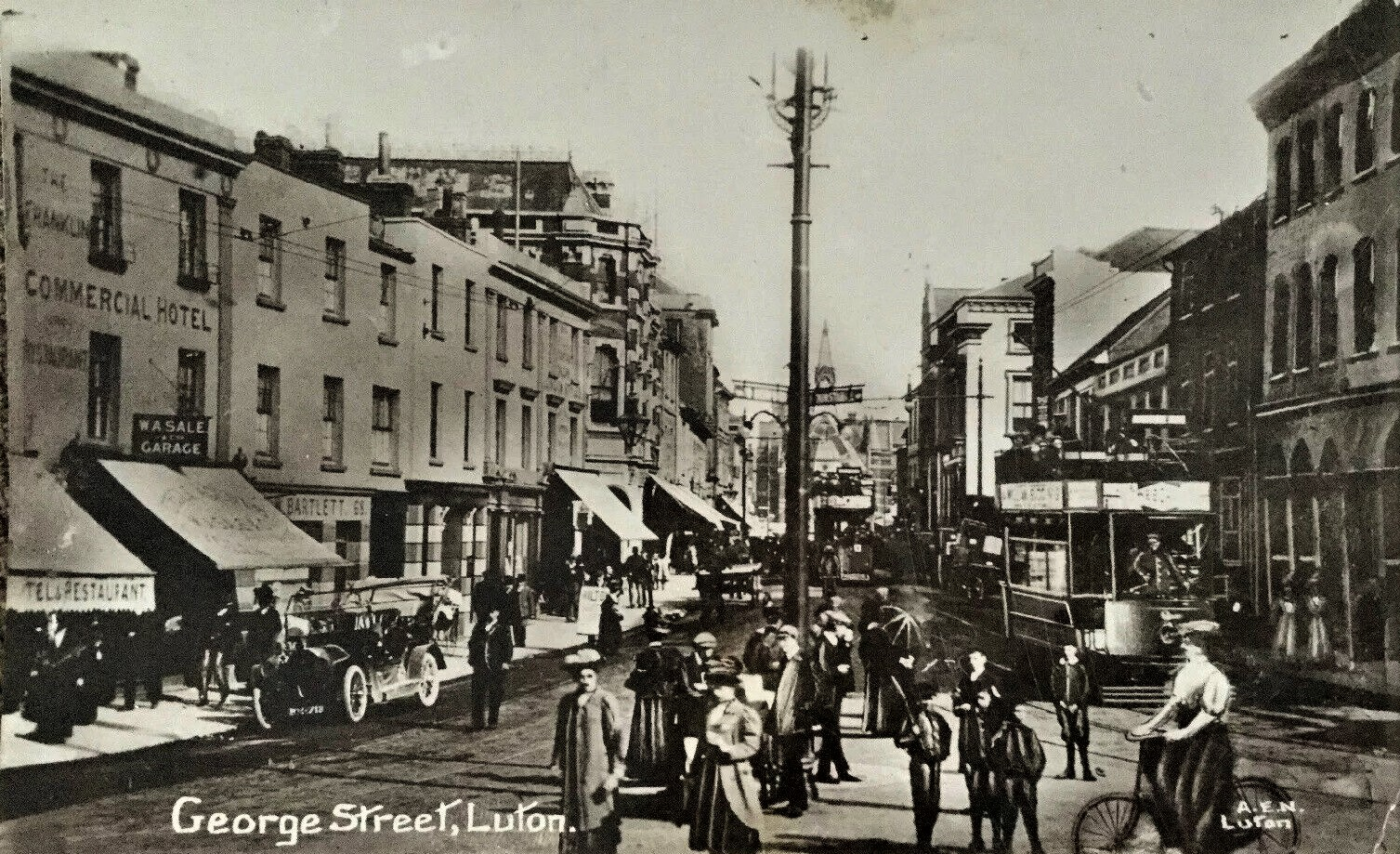
A view of George Street, looking South East towards market hill, showing the trams around 1913.

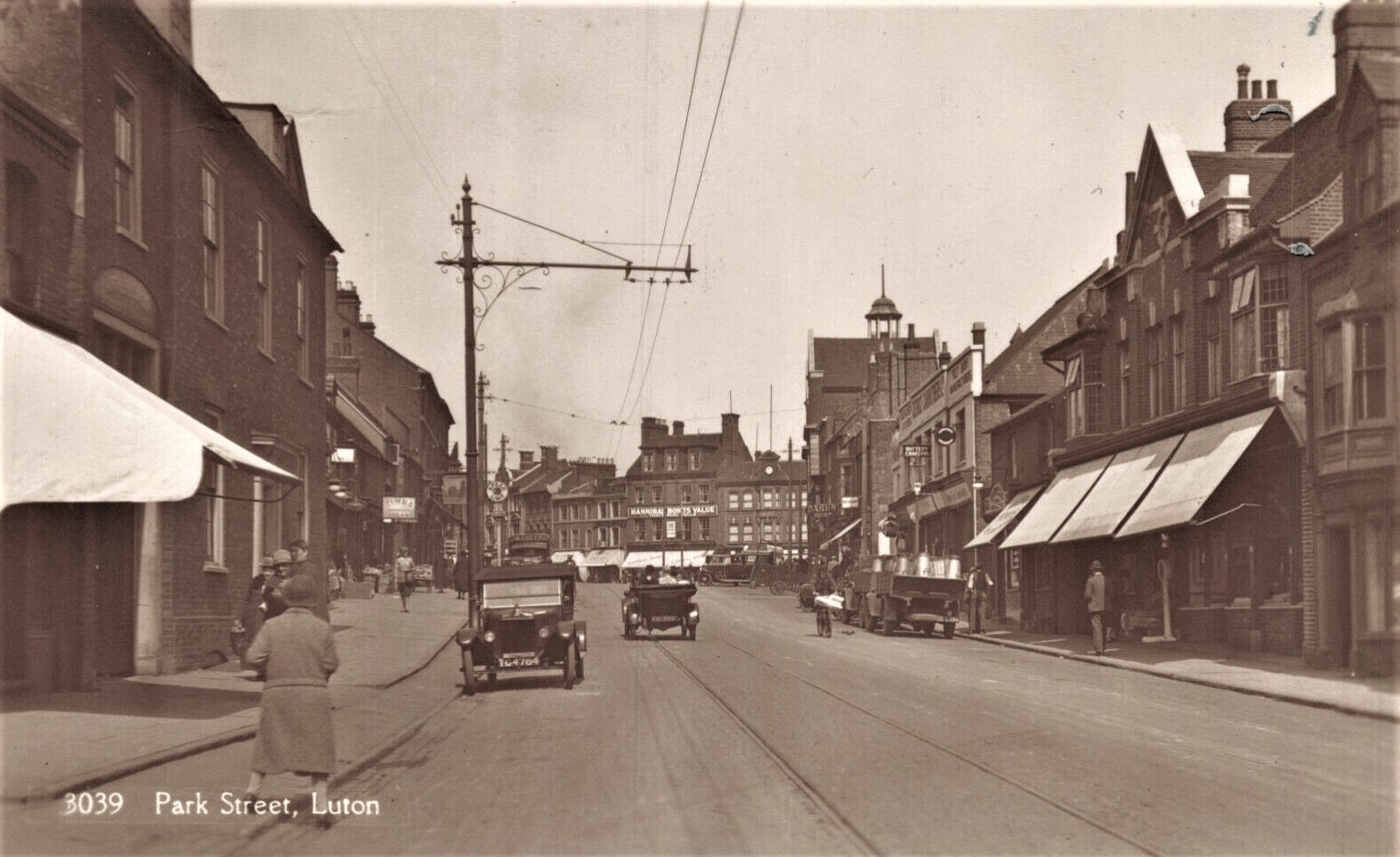
Tram infrastructure on Park Street in the 20th century.

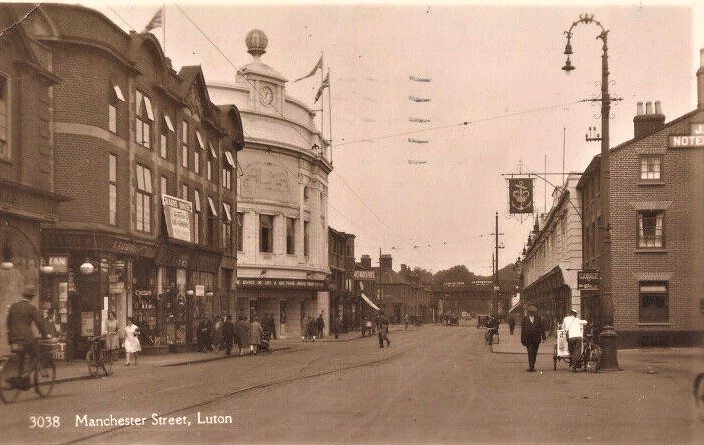
Tram Infrastructure on Manchester Street in 1931.

== Infrastructure ==
The complete system opened in 1908, and had five routes originating at the Town Hall:

- Manchester Street, Mill Street, Midland Road, High Town Road, Hitchin Road to a terminus at the junction with Ramridge Road at TL 10129 22723. (Round Green)
- Manchester Street, New Bedford Road to a terminus by Wardown Park at TL 08741 22881
- Upper George Street, Dunstable Road to a terminus at the junction with Kingsway at TL 07167 22483
- George Street, Chapel Street, Windsor Street, Hibbert Street, Ashton Road, London Road to a terminus at the junction with Tennyson Road at TL 09018 19874. (Stockwood)
- George Street, Park Street to the depot situated opposite Bailey Street at TL 09774 20772. (Park Town)

== Tramcars ==
The fleet, in a livery of grass green with ivory window frames and rocker panels, consisted of:

- 12 open top double deck tramcars, from the United Electric Car Company, each with two 30 h.p. motors. In 1929 five were converted to top covered.
- 1 single deck tramcar.

In 1923, a single deck car was purchased from Glasgow Corporation Tramways as an economy measure.

== Closure ==
Towards the end of 1930, the Eastern National Omnibus Company made an offer to purchase the Luton tramways for £64,000 (equivalent to £3,620,000 in 2025). The offer was accepted by the council on 20 January 1931. On 12 May 1932, the council re-affirmed its decision to sell out to the Eastern National Omnibus Company. However, it was forced to rescind its decision, and eventually decided to operate its own buses in place of the trams.

The tramway system closed on 16 April 1932 and was replaced by the motorbuses of Luton Corporation.

== Preserved tramcar ==
Luton's only single deck tram is being restored, for static display, at Stockwood Discovery Centre.

== Uncovered tramlines ==
On Monday 3 February 2014 a section of road was dug up by contractors during the process of building a new road (to run alongside the current railway lines) at the junction of Old Bedford Road and Midland Road, Luton. Following removal of tarmac and cobblestones a section of single tram line was clearly visible still buried in the road.

== See also ==
List of town tramway systems in the United Kingdom
