= BISF house =

British house design

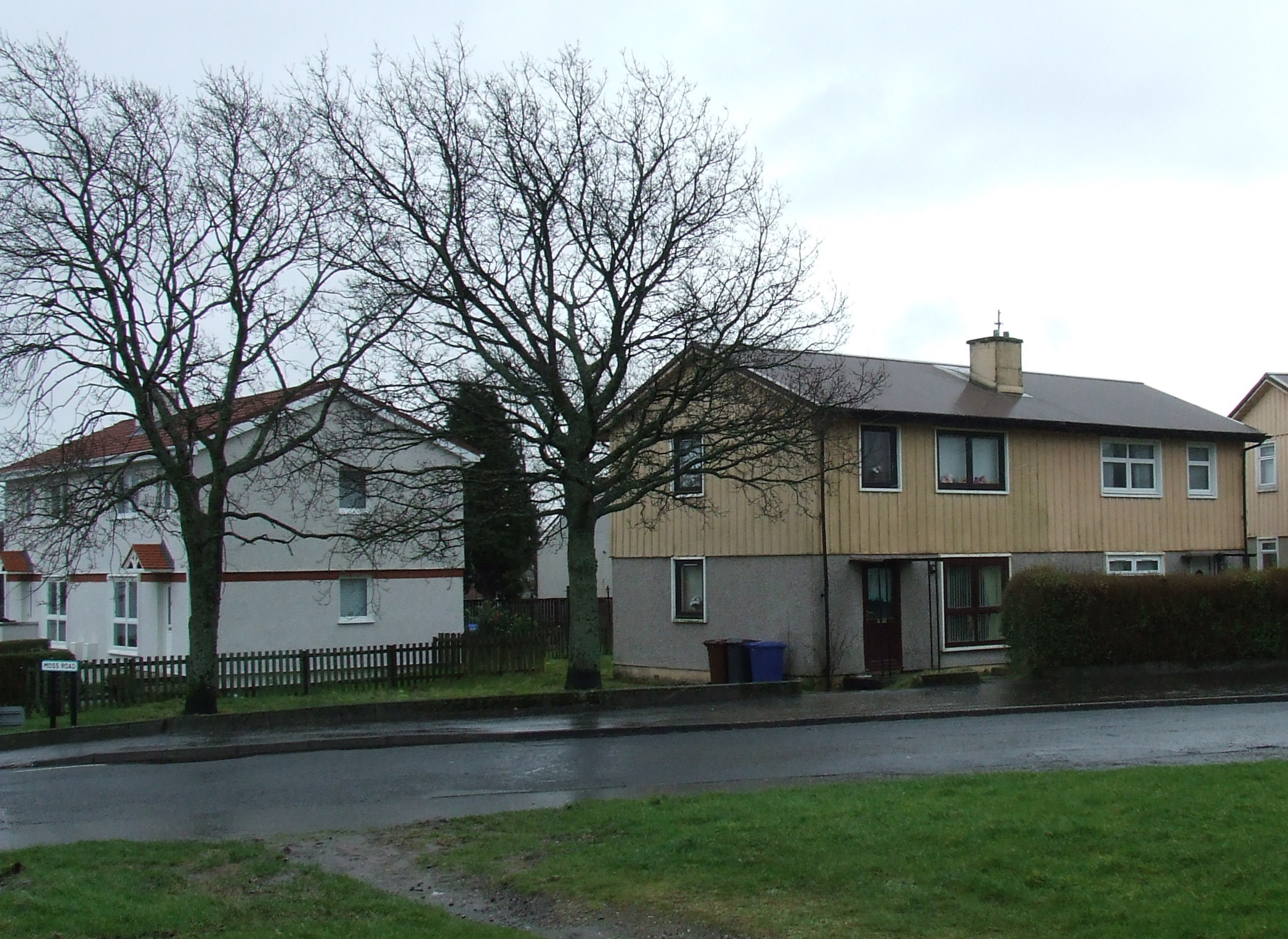
Original (right) and externally cladded (left) BISF type houses at Moss Road and Bardrainney Avenue, Port Glasgow

The BISF house is a type of steel-framed prefabricated house that was built in large numbers in England, Scotland and Wales from 1946. It was designed and produced by the British Iron and Steel Federation (BISF), and was one of many types of prefabs in the United Kingdom used in national strategies to deal with the housing shortage after the end of World War II.

== Role of the British Iron and Steel Federation ==
BISF was an association of steel producers formed in 1934 and was responsible for the national planning of steel production during World War II.

It later contributed to the Ministry of Works' Emergency Factory Made post-war housing programme with a design by Sir Frederick Gibberd, who was also responsible for the Howard house. This steel framed BISF house was intended as permanent housing.

Produced by the British Steel Homes company, the BISF was successful in numerical terms, thanks to the backing of its trade sponsors, who could ensure a supply of steel. The BISF also benefited from a guaranteed order of 30,000 units given directly by the Government in 1941.

== Design ==
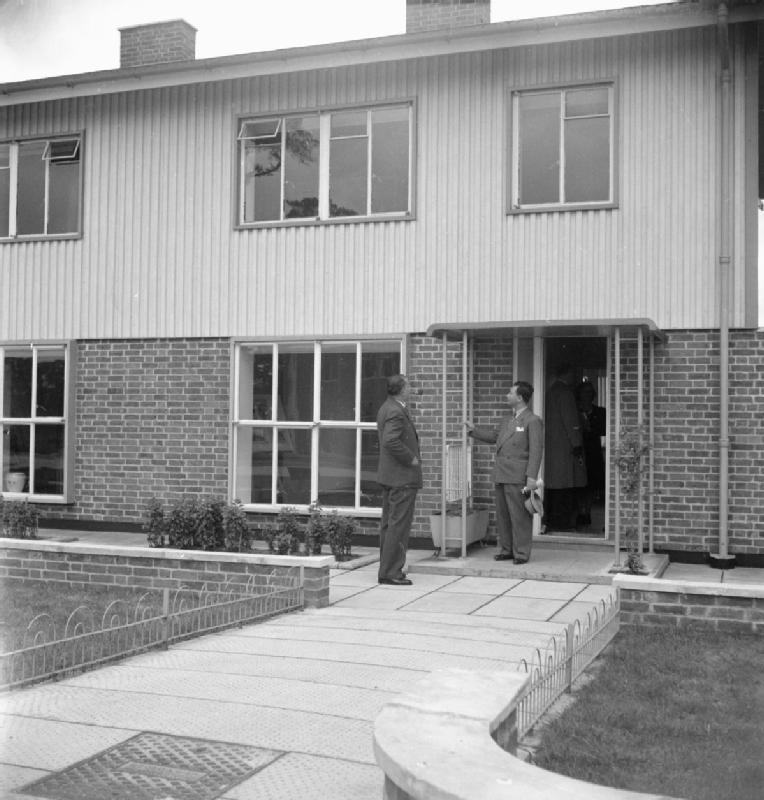
New BISF house on a Ministry of Works experimental housing estate at Northolt

Aesthetically, the BISF house is of a conventional design, with simple architectural devices of projecting window surrounds encasing and differing cladding to the upper and lower stories deal with the junction between components in an understated fashion. Traditional materials could be incorporated or simulated, for example a brick cladding to the lower storey, or steel sheet profiled to match timber weatherboarding to the upper. The houses used Crittall Hope windows.

The main structure is of steel columns spaced to take standard metal windows between them. The central spine of the building which supports the first floor beams is carried on tubular steel columns. The framework is clad on the lower storey with rendering on metal lath. The outer cladding of the upper floor is of steel trussed sheeting fixed by angles to the steel columns. The inner cladding and the partitions are constructed of timber framing faced with plasterboard or hardboard. The upper floors are of tongue & grooved timber and the ceilings are finished with plasterboard or fibreboard. The outer walls and ceilings are insulated with glass quilting.

BISF Houses were built as permanent homes with a similar expected lifespan to that of a traditional brick built house.

== Confusion with temporary house types ==
BISF houses are often confused with other prefabricated houses built in the same post-war era. They are often wrongly referred to as temporary dwellings and incorrectly classified as such due to their visual similarity to the aluminium BL8 and Arcon temporary bungalows which did have an expected lifespan of just 10 years. This can cause problems because many of the other types of prefabricated housing are listed as Defective Housing and potential buyers can not obtain mortgages. BISF houses however have never been listed as defective and continue to be mortgageable.

== Areas with BISF houses ==
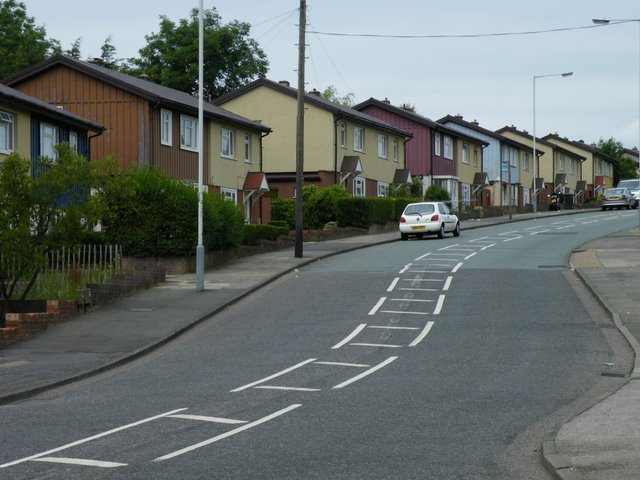
BISF houses on Ashcroft Road Tin Town, Luton

Places with many BISF houses include:

Scotland

- Bardrainney in Port Glasgow
- Bellsmyre in Dumbarton
- Craighall Quadrant, a small housing estate in Neilston, East Renfrewshire

England within or settlements adjoining the M25 motorway

- 25 roads across North Ilford/Hainault/Loughton, outer north-east London
- 17 roads in Dagenham, outer east London
- 17 roads in HA3 (variously in Harrow Weald and Hatch End), Harrow
- 6 roads in WD6 principally South Oxhey, Watford, beyond Harrow Weald
- 5 roads in Dartford and 5 in Bexley, outer SE London
- 3 "drives" in Hayes, four streets in Greenford and two in Northolt, outer west London
- Five roads in New Haw, four in West Molesey, three near Kempton Park in Lower Sunbury, the same in Shepperton Green, the same in Cobham, Surrey.

England outside M25 motorway

- 29 roads, in PO6, principally Paulsgrove, in the city of Portsmouth
- 21 roads across DN15 and DN16 in Scunthorpe, Lincolnshire
- 17 roads in NG8 by the city of Nottingham
- 16 roads in PL2, Plymouth, Devon
- 15 roads in NE5, Newcastle upon Tyne
- 15 roads in Stoke-on-Trent and 11 in neighbouring Newcastle-under-Lyme
- 14 roads in DN2 in the city of Doncaster
- 14 short roads in Corby, Northamptonshire
- 13 roads in the far west of the city of Bristol
- 13 roads in Swindon, Wiltshire
- 12 roads all in Overslade, CV22 in Rugby, Warwickshire
- 11 roads in CT1 in the city of Canterbury
- 11 roads in Aylesbury and 5 in Wycombe, Buckinghamshire
- 11 roads in CV4 in the city of Coventry
- Ten roads in WS3, Walsall, West Midlands
- Nine roads in S18, Dronfield Woodhouse/Unstone, Derbyshire
- Nine roads in Sheldon in the city of Birmingham
- Nine roads in the city of Bath
- Eight roads in Consett, County Durham
- Eight roads in LE3, Leicester
- Eight roads in OX3, in the city of Oxford part of which is Headington
- Eight roads in the city of Salford near Manchester
- Eight roads in YO26, in the city of York
- Eight roads in DE21, in the city of Derby
- Eight roads in Earlham, in the city of Norwich and four in adjoining NR4
- Eight roads, in Taunton, Somerset
- Seven roads comprising "Tin Town" in Luton, Bedfordshire
- Seven roads in BS23, Weston super Mare, Somerset
- Seven roads in HU5 in the city of Hull
- Seven roads in East Leake between Loughborough and Nottingham
- Crowmoor Estate (as to six roads) in Shrewsbury
- New Lodge in Barnsley, South Yorkshire
- Six roads in Braintree, Essex
- Six roads in SR7 part of which in Seaham, County Durham
- Six roads in Harrogate, North Yorkshire
- Five roads in the city of Preston, Lancashire
- Five roads in Castleford and five in Dewsbury, West Yorkshire
- Five roads in Stretton, Derbyshire
- Five roads in Bournemouth, Dorset
- Four roads in the city of Blackburn
- Three roads in Hyde, Greater Manchester
- Three roads in Windsor, Berkshire

Wales

- Gabalfa in Llandaff North, Cardiff
- Ffynonnau in Crickhowell, Powys
