= Round Green =

Area of Luton, England

Coordinates: 51.895°N 0.406°W

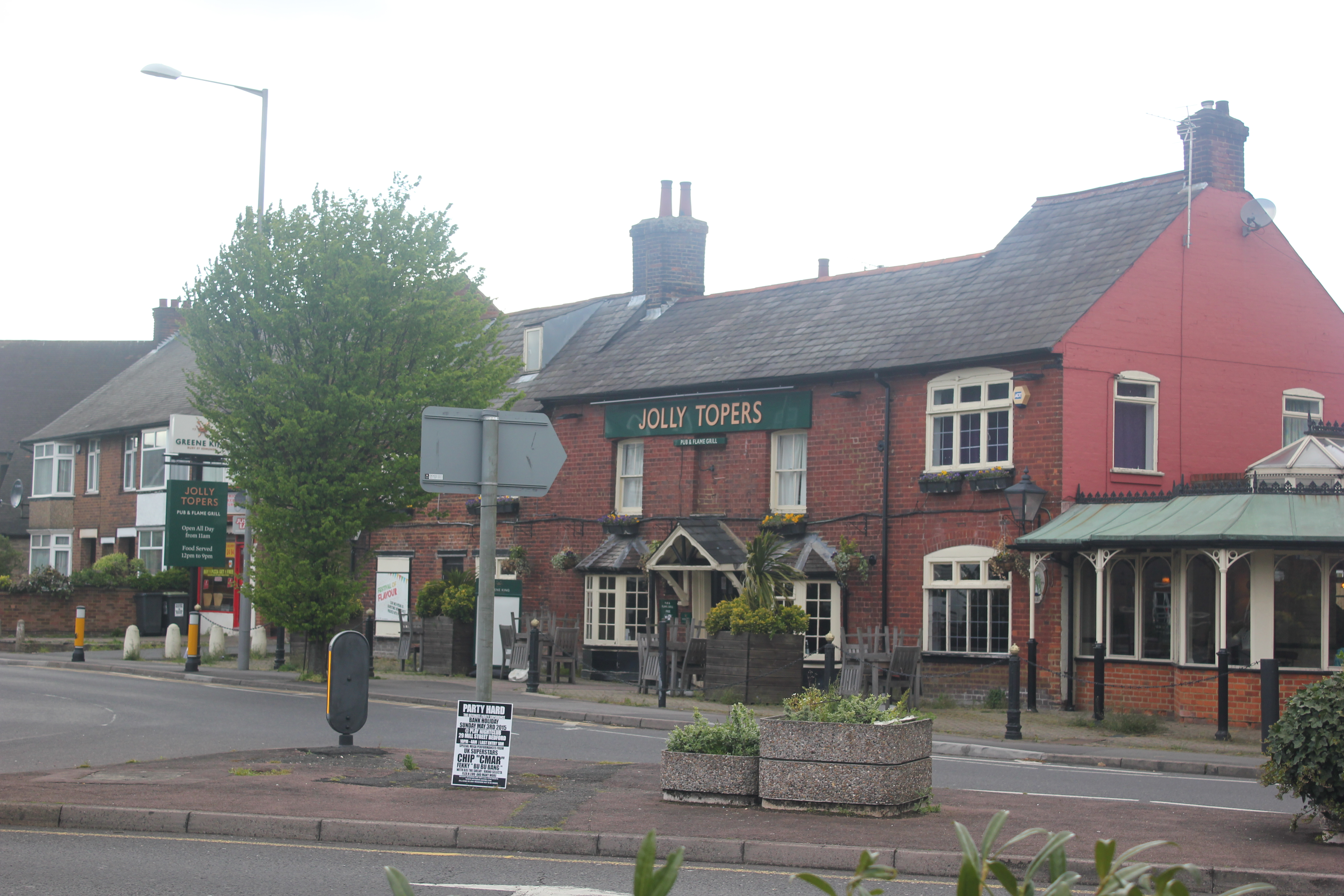
- The Jolly Topers public house, Hitchin Road

- Location within Bedfordshire
- Population: 11,950
- OS grid reference: TL095225
- Unitary authority: Luton
- Ceremonial county: Bedfordshire
- Region: East
- Country: England
- Sovereign state: United Kingdom
- Post town: LUTON
- Postcode district: LU2
- Dialling code: 01582
- Police: Bedfordshire
- Fire: Bedfordshire
- Ambulance: East of England
- UK Parliament: Luton South

Round Green is a suburb of Luton just over 1 mile (1.6 km) north-east of the town centre, and a ward of the Borough of Luton, in the ceremonial county of Bedfordshire, England. The area is roughly bounded by Bradgers Hill to the north, People's Park, Richmond Hill and Turners Road South to the south, Wardown Crescent and Elmwood Crescent to the west, and Vauxhall Way to the east.

== History ==
Formerly a small hamlet between Biscot, Leagrave and Stopsley, Round Green is one of the oldest parts of Luton, with references to the area dating back to 1170.

The area originally called Cowridge End stretches from what is now Old Bedford Road up to Birchen Grove in the North and down to Crawley Green in the south. The area was officially assumed into the boundary of Luton in 1933.

In 1908, the Luton Tram Service started up, with route one terminating at Round Green (starting out in Park Street). The tram service in the town was short-lived, and in 1931 the council decided to replace the trams with buses.

== Culture and community ==
=== Culture ===
==== Architecture and historic buildings ====
There is a Grade II-listed water tower on Hart Lane which is one of the most prominent points on Luton's skyline if looking eastwards from the centre. The building was erected in 1900 following a drought that affected the Stopsley area and is a counterpart to a similarly aged water town on West Hill Road in New Town.

=== Community facilities ===
==== Groups and societies ====
The Luton Co-Operative Club is based on Stockingstone Road and is a member's club featuring a bar and sports facilities.

==== Parks and open spaces ====
There are few parks and open spaces in the Round Green area due to the proximity of People's Park in High Town and other large spaces in the Crawley area. There is a small children's play area at Abbotswood Park between Abbots Wood Road and Abbey Drive, and a wooded area at the northernmost point of Hitchin Road.

==== Historic public houses ====
The Jolly Topers on the Hitchin Road roundabout has licensing records dating back to 1822 and is the last remaining public house in the area. A murder inquest was held there in 1867. A large horse-chestnut tree stood next to the roundabout outside the Jolly Topers; it had presided over the area for 150 years until 2001.

On the other side of the roundabout was the Round Green Tavern, which closed in the late 2010s. The site has been redeveloped as an estate agents office and residential apartments. Next to the Round Green Tavern was the Royal Oak pub, first mentioned in 1850. Closed in the late 2000s, the building has been converted into a veterinary clinic. The Somerset Tavern on the corner of Somerset Avenue and Crawley Green Road was renovated into residential flats in 2009.

== Education ==
Richmond Hill Primary is a special school on Sunridge Avenue. The school has a second site in Wigmore.

There are no secondary schools in Round Green; most of the area is within the catchment areas of either Stopsley High School or Queen Elizabeth School.

== Religious sites ==
=== Churches ===
St. Anne's Church, on the corner of Crawley Green Road and Hart Lane, and St. Christopher's Church, on the corner of Stockingstone Road and Felix Avenue, share equal standing within the Parish of St. Anne's in the Diocese of St Albans. The Grade II listed, brick-built St. Christopher's Church, is by Albert Richardson. Building commenced in 1936–7 but the chancel and vestries were not added until 1959. St. Anne's is also home to the Romanian Orthodox church for the area.

=== Former sites ===
A Methodist chapel, built in 1865, stood on the junction of Ramridge Road and Hitchin Road opposite the Jolly Topers public house. The building was used as a parish hall from 1911 but has since been demolished and the site is now a car park. The Methodists relocated to a new chapel on Turners Road South in 1911. In 1959, a more modern chapel building was erected in front of and connected to the chapel, which became a Sunday school. The church closed in 1997 and the 1959 chapel building was demolished shortly after. The 1911 structure still stands and has been used as a children's nursery since at least 2010.

== Sport and leisure ==
Luton Indoor Bowling Club, established in 1988, has a purpose-built facility off Stockingstone Road officially opened by Diana, Princess of Wales in the same year. Adjacent is an outdoor bowling green operated by the Co-Op Luton Bowls Club.

== Politics ==
Round Green is part of the larger Round Green ward, which also contains parts of Ramridge End and Tin Town. The Councillors for Round Green ward are Cllr David Chapman (Liberal Democrats), Cllr Steve Moore (Liberal Democrats) and Cllr Tahmina Saleem (Labour).

The ward forms part of the parliamentary constituency of Luton South and the MP is Rachel Hopkins (Labour).

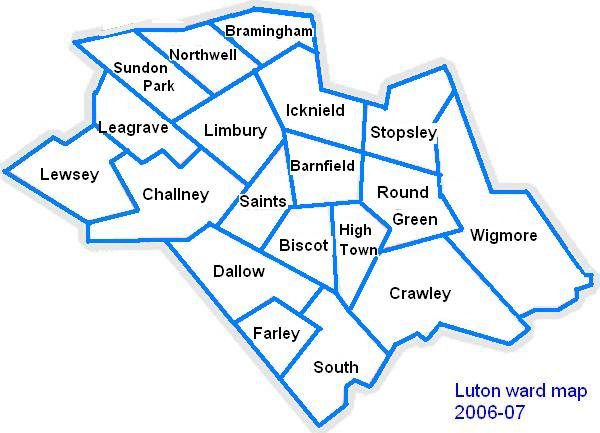
Map of Luton showing Round Green

== Local attractions ==
Key
	Abbey/Priory/Cathedral
Accessible open space	Accessible open space
	Amusement/Theme Park
	Castle
Country Park	Country Park
	English Heritage
	Forestry Commission
Heritage railway	Heritage railway
Historic house	Historic House
Places of Worship	Places of Worship
Museum (free) Museum	Museum (free/not free)
National Trust	National Trust
	Theatre
	Zoo

- Chiltern Hills
- Dunstable Downs
- The Hat Factory
- Leighton Buzzard Light Railway
- Luton Hoo
- Luton Museum & Art Gallery
- Mossman Collection
- Someries castle
- Stockwood Craft Museum
- Stockwood Park
- Wardown Park
- Waulud's Bank
- Whipsnade Tree Cathedral
- Whipsnade Wildlife Park
- Woodside Farm and Wildfowl Park
- Wrest Park Gardens

== Local newspapers ==
Two weekly newspapers cover Round Green, although they are not specific to the area.

- Herald and Post
- Luton News
