= Francis Egerton (Royal Navy officer) =

Politician and Royal Navy Admiral (1824–1895)

Admiral The Honourable Francis Egerton

Member of Parliament for Derbyshire North-East
- In office 1885–1886
- Preceded by: New constituency
- Succeeded by: Thomas Bolton

Member of Parliament for Derbyshire East
- In office 1868–1885
- Preceded by: New constituency
- Succeeded by: Constituency abolished

Personal details
- Born: 15 September 1824
- Died: 15 December 1895 (aged 71) Weybridge, Surrey, England
- Spouse: Lady Louisa Caroline Cavendish (m. 1861)
- Relations: See Egerton family
- Children: 5
- Parent(s): Francis Egerton, 1st Earl of Ellesmere; Harriet Catherine Greville

Admiral Francis Egerton (15 September 1824 – 15 December 1895), known as Francis Leveson-Gower until 1833, was a British naval commander and politician from the Egerton family.

== Early life ==
Egerton was the second son of eleven children born to Harriet Catherine Greville, Countess of Ellesmere, and Francis Egerton, 1st Earl of Ellesmere, who served as Secretary at War and Chief Secretary for Ireland. His father inherited the considerable wealth (but not the titles) of Francis Egerton, 3rd Duke of Bridgewater.

His mother, a great-great-granddaughter of the 5th Baron Brooke, was the daughter of Charles Greville, and his paternal grandparents were George Leveson-Gower, 1st Duke of Sutherland and Elizabeth Leveson-Gower, Duchess of Sutherland (daughter of the 18th Earl of Sutherland). His maternal uncle was the private secretary to the Duke of Wellington.

== Career ==
In 1840, he joined the Royal Navy and immediately saw active service due to the Oriental Crisis of that year: he served off the Syrian coast and was present at the bombardment of Acre. During the Crimean War he was in command of HMS Basilisk and in 1855 he reached the rank of captain.

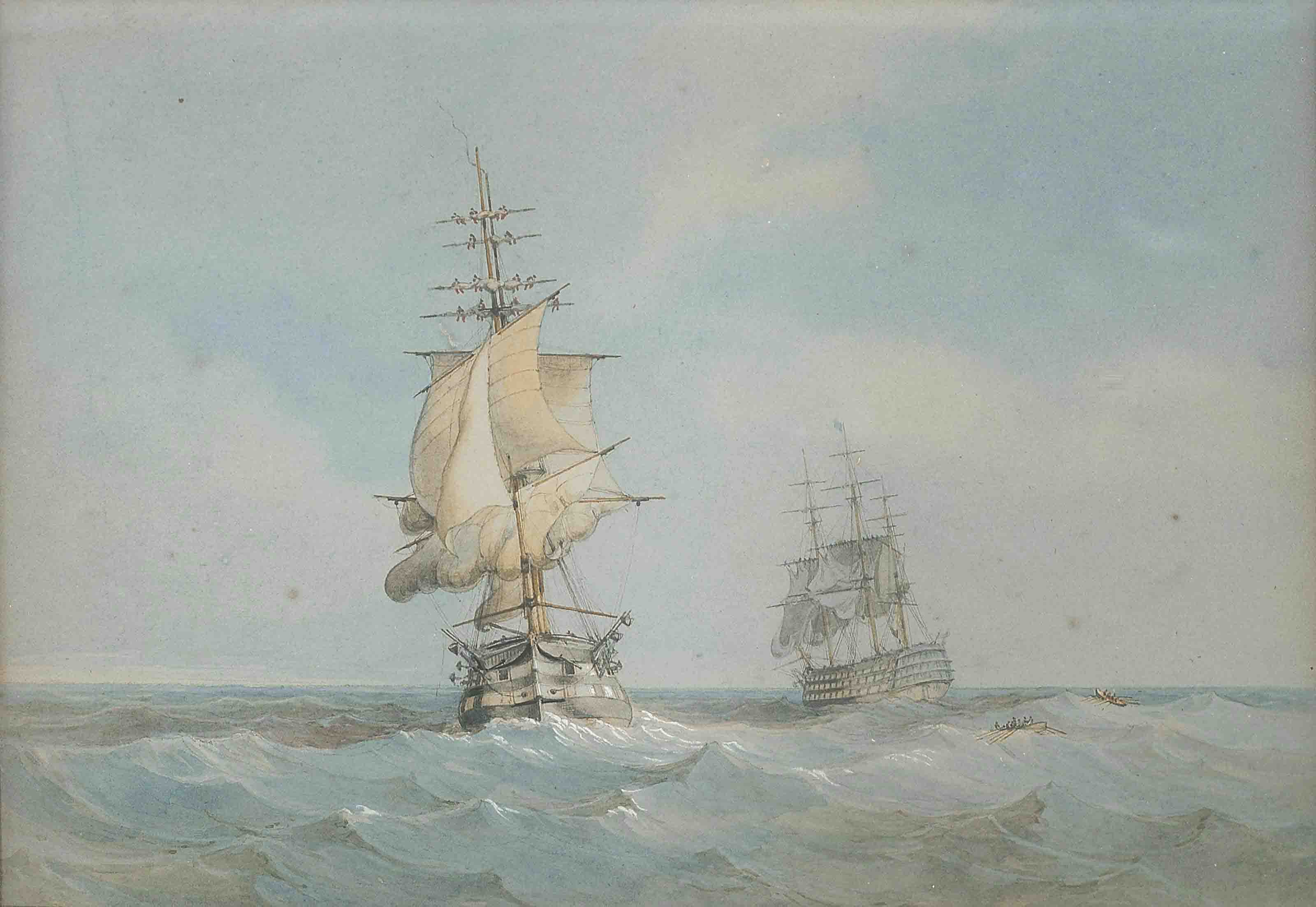
HMS Centurion and the Royal Albert attempt to save a man overboard, during the passage to Corfu, circa 1857–58, as sketched by Capt. Egerton of the Royal Albert

He was aide-de-camp to Queen Victoria from 1865 to 1873. In 1873, he was promoted to Rear admiral, and he was placed on the retired list in November 1875. Following his retirement, he continued to be promoted: in 1878 to Vice-admiral and in 1884 to the rank of Admiral.

He also sat as Member of Parliament for Derbyshire East from 1868 to 1885 and for Derbyshire North-East from 1885 to 1886.

In his later years he was a resident of Surrey, where he continued his political activities as president of the Chertsey Division of the Central Liberal Council. He was appointed Lord Lieutenant of the county in 1893.

== Personal life ==
Egerton married Lady Louisa Caroline Cavendish (1835–1907), daughter of William Cavendish, 7th Duke of Devonshire, and sister of Spencer Cavendish, 8th Duke of Devonshire, in 1861. Together, Francis and Lady Louisa were the parents of:

- William Francis Egerton (1868–1949), who married Lady Alice Osborne, a daughter of George Osborne, 9th Duke of Leeds
- Commander Frederick Greville Egerton (1869–1899), who died at Ladysmith in South Africa, from wounds received in action.
- Blanche Harriet Egerton (1871–1943), who was born in London.
- Dorothy Charlotte Egerton (1874–1959), who was appointed Officer, Order of the British Empire.
- Christian Mary Egerton (1876–1970), who was appointed Member, Order of the British Empire.

He died on 15 December 1895 at his home in Weybridge from heart disease aged 71 and was buried at Byfleet.

=== Descendants ===
Through his son Francis, he was a grandfather of Captain Francis Egerton (1896–1935), who married the Hon. Doris Mary Pottinger Meysey-Thompson, a daughter of Henry Meysey-Thompson, 1st Baron Knaresborough and Ethel Adeline Pottinger (daughter of Sir Henry Pottinger, 3rd Baronet). Among her siblings was Helen Winifred, Lady Newton, the mother of Peter Richard Legh, 4th Baron Newton; Violet Ethel Meysey-Thompson, the mother of Giles Vandeleur and wife of Sir Algar Howard.

With Laura Jean Mary Stevenson, his son William Francis Egerton had an illegitimate child Harold Nigel Egerton Salmon, a Royal Air Force (RAF) pilot and the father of actress Joanna Pettet.

Parliament of the United Kingdom
New constituency	Member of Parliament for Derbyshire East; 1868–1885; With: Henry Strutt 1868–1874; Francis Arkwright 1874–1880; Alfred Barnes 1880–1885	Constituency abolished
New constituency	Member of Parliament for Derbyshire North-East; 1885–1886	Succeeded by Thomas Bolton
Honorary titles
Preceded by The Earl of Lovelace	Lord Lieutenant of Surrey; 1893–1895	Succeeded by The Viscount Midleton
