= Barnet Kenyon =

British politician

Personal details
- Born: July 1850 South Anston, Yorkshire, England
- Died: 20 February 1930 (aged 79) Chesterfield, Derbyshire, England
- Party: Liberal
- Other political affiliations: Lib–Lab
- Spouse: Elizabeth Ramsden
- Children: one adopted

Barnet Kenyon (July 1850 – 20 February 1930) was a British colliery worker, trade union official and Lib–Lab, later Liberal, politician.

== Early career ==
Kenyon was born at South Anston, West Riding of Yorkshire (now South Yorkshire), the son of Henry Kenyon and Ann Hanson. He had no formal education, and went to work in a local stone quarry at the age of seven and a half. At 13, he walked to Conisbrough to work in the newly opened Denaby Main pit. At 16, he went to work at Darfield, where he was injured by a falling pit prop. From there, he went to Old Oaks, Barnsley, when it was reopened after the explosions which had killed 361 men. He moved frequently, working at Ashley Deep, Dukinfield; Ince Colliery, Wigan; and Kiveton Park. From 1876 to 1906 he worked at the Shireoaks Company's Southgate Pit from 1880 as check-weighman, a representative elected by coal miners to check the findings of the mine owner's weighman where miners were paid by the weight of coal mined.

== Private life ==
In 1878, he married Elizabeth Ramsden. They had no children but fostered the four children of his brother George, whose wife, Kezia (née Parker), had died in childbirth. He adopted a son, Ernest, and brought up three other children. In religion, Kenyon was a strict non-conformist, a Primitive Methodist and lay preacher in Chesterfield and in the nearby village of Clowne.

== Miners' Federation official ==
Kenyon was clearly a popular figure with his fellow coal miners. He helped to found the Derbyshire Miners Association in 1880, and from 1898 until 1906 he was President of the Derbyshire Miners' Federation. He was afterwards assistant secretary, a paid position, and by January 1912 he had become the Federation's secretary. During unrest in the coal field during that month, he called publicly for any industrial action the miners might take to be directed towards the coal owners, who, according to Kenyon, were making fabulous profits, and not towards the public or other industries, who would resent indiscriminate strike action. By July 1913 Kenyon was Treasurer of the Federation.

== Politics ==
The best description of Kenyon's politics is Lib–Lab. There had always been close ties between the Liberal Party and organised labour and much overlap between them in terms of beliefs, political thought and personnel. In the late 19th and early 20th century many candidates were described as Lib–Labs but it was hard for working men to get adopted as Liberal candidates by Liberal Associations dominated by middle-class and professional men and this was a principal reason for the founding in 1900 of the Labour Representation Committee, the organisation which later became the Labour Party.

== Chesterfield by-election, 1913 ==
In 1913 Kenyon was selected by the Derbyshire Miners to succeed James Haslam, the Labour MP for Chesterfield since 1906, who had died on 31 July 1913. Once selected for the by-election in Chesterfield, Kenyon agreed to be adopted also by the local Liberal Association, and the question of his party description and affiliation became a divisive issue in the Chesterfield constituency, the Derbyshire Miners' Federation and nationally.

The controversy over Kenyon's party affiliation spilled over into the contest, but in the event he won easily, topping the poll with a majority of 2,186 over the Unionist candidate, Edward Christie, while the socialist, John Scurr, received only 583 votes.

1913 Chesterfield by-election
Party	Candidate	Votes	%	±%
Liberal	Barnet Kenyon	7,725	55.8	
Unionist	Edward Christie	5,539	40.0	
Independent Labour	John Scurr	583	4.2	
Turnout			81.5	
Majority		2,186	15.8	
Liberal gain from Labour		Swing		

The result was much better than Kenyon or other commentators had expected, and, despite all the furore his candidacy had created, Kenyon seemed to have been able to appeal to all elements of progressive opinion in the constituency.

== Political career ==
On 25 November 1918 The Times noted that Barnet Kenyon had again been selected to fight Chesterfield in the forthcoming 1918 general election, describing him as the Labour candidate. As it happened, Kenyon had no competition and was returned unopposed, his party affiliation being shown as Liberal; he is on the list of historian Roy Douglas as an official Liberal in receipt of the ‘Coupon'. It is also known that his nomination papers included the signatures of some local Unionist officials and later press reports described him as a Coalition Liberal. Despite this, Kenyon lent his support to uncouponed candidates elsewhere in Derbyshire, perhaps still hedging his party political bets in anticipation of future election contests. It served him well for the 1922 general election, as he was again returned unopposed. However, at the 1923 election, Kenyon faced Labour and Conservative opponents, but held off the challenge with a comfortable majority of nearly 6,000 votes.

General election 6 December 1923: Chesterfield
Party	Candidate	Votes	%	±%
Liberal	Barnet Kenyon	12,164	50.9	n/a
Labour	George Benson	6,198	25.9	n/a
Unionist	R F H Broomhead-Colton-Fox	5,541	23.2	n/a
Majority		5,966	25.0	n/a
Turnout		23,903		n/a
Liberal hold		Swing	n/a	

At the general election of 1924 he faced only Labour opposition and again emerged as the clear winner, with a majority of 4,765 votes

General election, 29 October 1924: Chesterfield
Party	Candidate	Votes	%	±%
Liberal	Barnet Kenyon	13,971	60.3	+9.4
Labour	George Benson	9,206	39.7	+13.8
Majority				
Turnout		23,177	64.4	
Liberal hold		Swing		

Illness was the reason Kenyon gave for not contesting the 1929 general election, but advancing age must also have been factor; that year he turned 79.

In addition to being a Member of Parliament, Kenyon was a member of the Chesterfield Board of Guardians, the Old Age Pension Committee and the Derbyshire Insurance Committee. He was appointed a Trustee of the King's Fund for the Disabled. He also served as a Justice of the Peace for the County of Derby and was a Member of the Lord Lieutenant's Committee for the Appointment of Magistrates. He died in Chesterfield.

== See also ==
- List of Liberal Party (UK) MPs

Parliament of the United Kingdom
Preceded by James Haslam	Member of Parliament for Chesterfield; 1913–1929	Succeeded by George Benson
Trade union offices
Preceded by William Hallam	President of the Derbyshire Miners' Association; 1898–1906	Succeeded by James Martin
