= Bardrainney =

Coordinates: 55.92°N 4.66°W

Bardrainney: Scottish Gaelic: Bàrr Draighnigh
- Location within Inverclyde
- OS grid reference: NS339728
- Council area: Inverclyde
- Lieutenancy area: Renfrewshire
- Country: Scotland
- Sovereign state: United Kingdom
- Post town: PORT GLASGOW
- Postcode district: PA14
- Dialling code: 01475
- Police: Scotland
- Fire: Scottish
- Ambulance: Scottish
- UK Parliament: Inverclyde
- Scottish Parliament: Greenock and Inverclyde

Bardrainney is a neighbourhood of Port Glasgow, in the Inverclyde district of Scotland.

Bardrainney, possibly from the Gaelic for "hill of thorns", is (post 2000) a housing area, dating from the 1950s and built by the local council, on the hills above Port Glasgow, just to the south of the A761 road to Kilmacolm. The area is called after the farm of that name whose fields the houses occupy. The farm buildings no longer exist, but they were roughly on the site of the house of Alexander Dalzell, factor to the Earls of Glencairn, on the highest spot in the area in the open space at the top end of the present Moss Road, and they may have co-existed with the house.

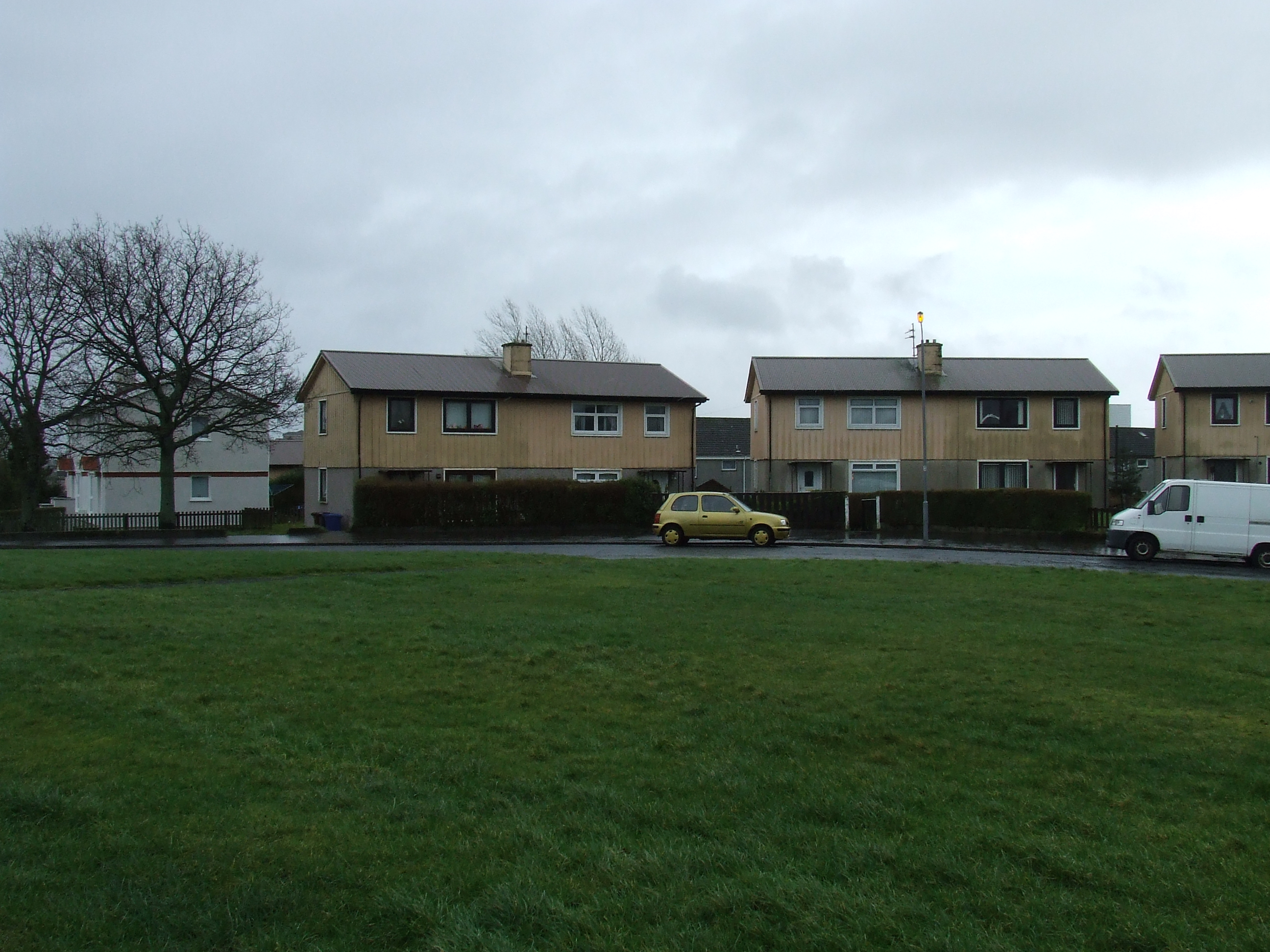
Bardrainney Avenue

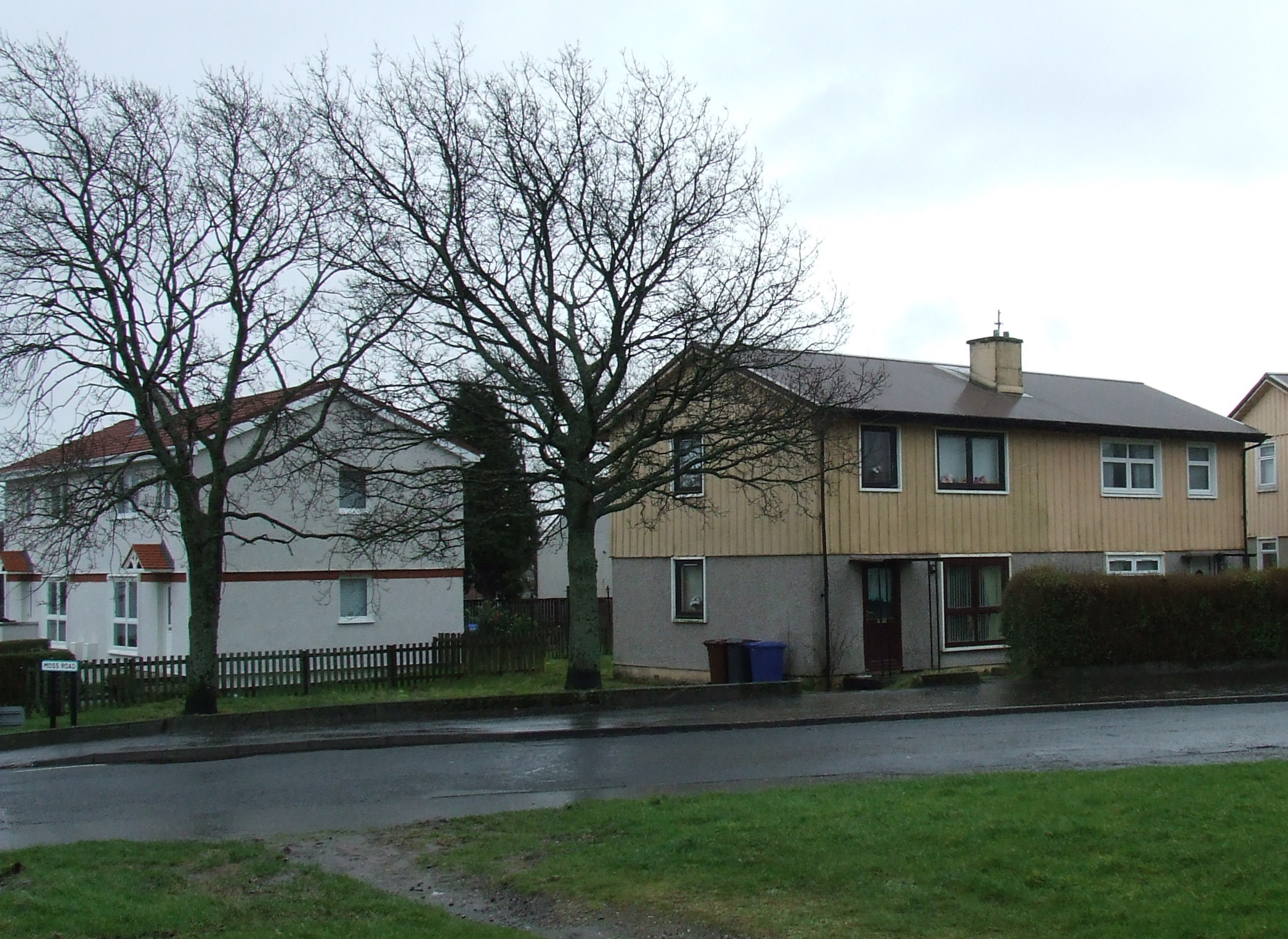
BISF houses before and after renovation

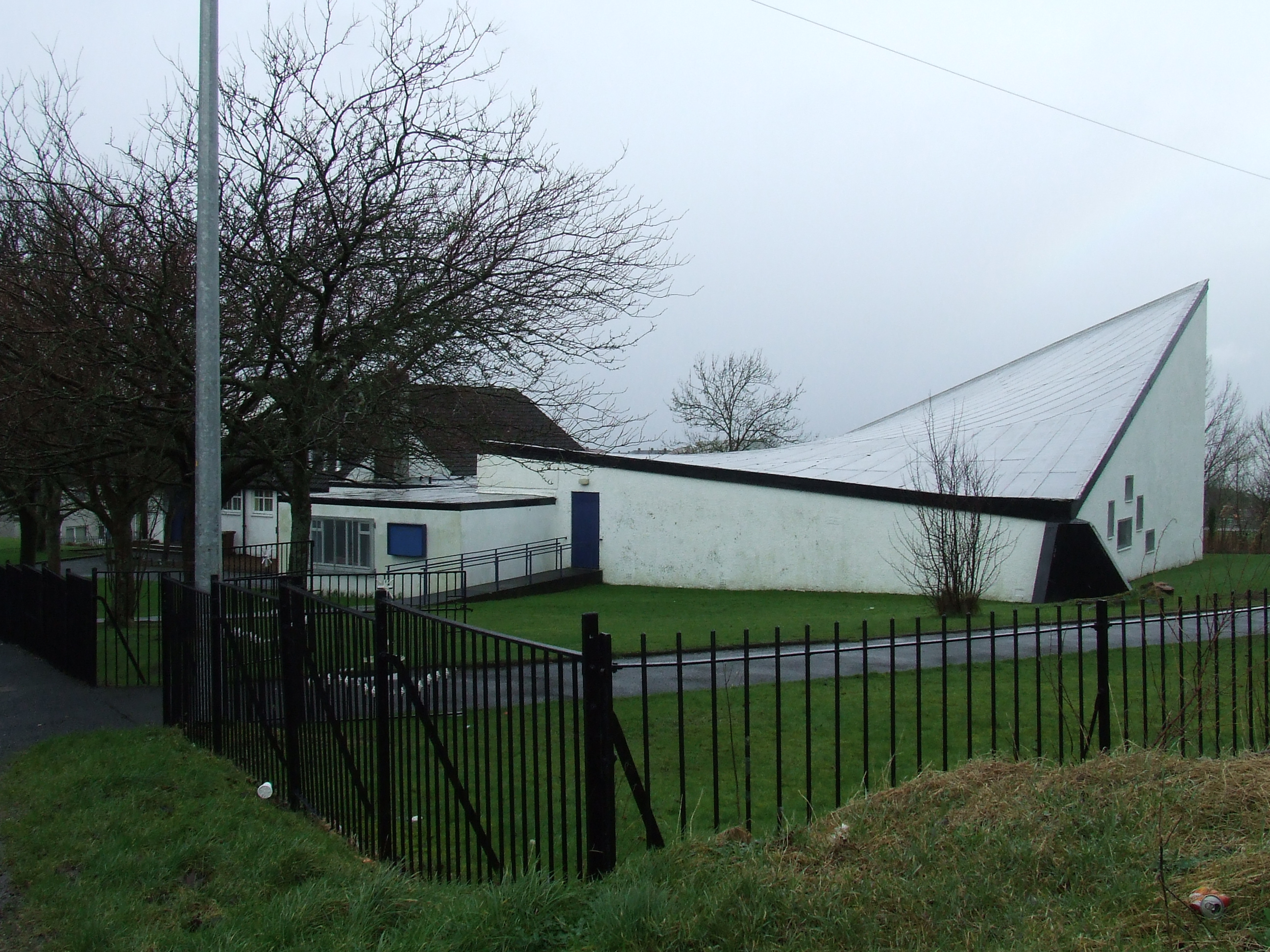
Hamilton Bardrainney Church

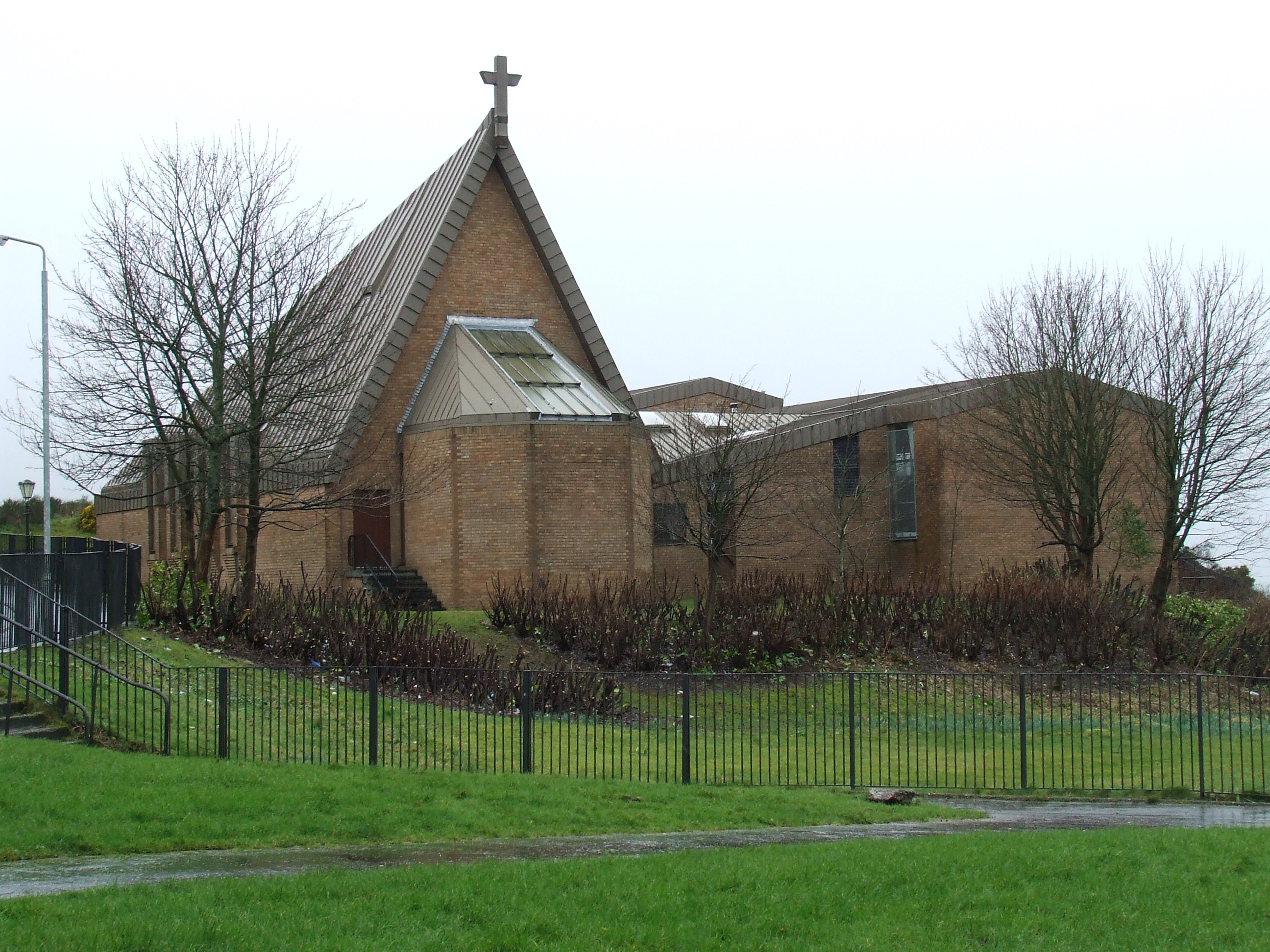
St Mary The Virgin Episcopal Church
