= Chesterfield (constituency) =

Parliamentary constituency in the United Kingdom, 1885 onwards

Coordinates: 53.25°N 1.40°W

- Borough constituency for the House of Commons
- Interactive map of boundaries since 2010
- Location within the East Midlands
- County: Derbyshire
- Population: 93,248 (2011 census)
- Electorate: 70,722 (March 2020)
- Major settlements: Chesterfield

Current constituency
- Created: 1885
- Member of Parliament: Toby Perkins (Labour)
- Seats: One
- Created from: Derbyshire East

Chesterfield is a constituency (Note: A borough constituency (for the purposes of election expenses and type of returning officer)) represented in the House of Commons of the UK Parliament since 2010 by Toby Perkins of the Labour Party. (Note: As with all constituencies, the constituency elects one Member of Parliament (MP) by the first past the post system of election at least every five years.)

== Constituency profile ==
The constituency is located in the north of Derbyshire. It covers most of the Borough of Chesterfield and includes the large town of Chesterfield, parts of the smaller town of Staveley and the village of Brimington. Chesterfield has an industrial heritage; coal mining was economically important to the town, and the boring machines used to create the Channel Tunnel were partly manufactured by Chesterfield-based Markham & Co. Parts of the town are highly deprived, particularly Birdholme and the north-west of the town, whilst the suburb of Walton is affluent. House prices are generally low.

On average, residents of Chesterfield are older, have lower incomes and lower levels of education and professional employment compared to the rest of the country. White people make up 95% of the population. At the local district council, most of the town elected Labour Party councillors whilst the wealthier suburbs are represented by Liberal Democrats. At the county council, most of the town is represented by Reform UK. Most voters in Chesterfield supported leaving the European Union in the 2016 referendum with an estimated 59% voting in favour of Brexit.

== Boundaries ==
=== 2010–2023 ===
From the 2010 general election, the boundaries were defined as comprising the following Borough of Chesterfield wards: Brimington North, Brimington South, Brockwell, Dunston, Hasland, Hollingwood and Inkersall, Holmebrook, Linacre, Loundsley Green, Middlecroft and Poolsbrook, Moor, Old Whittington, Rother, St Helen's, St Leonard's, Walton, and West.

The boundaries include the town of Chesterfield, together with areas to the north towards Dronfield and to the east towards Bolsover. The other two Borough of Chesterfield wards (Barrow Hill and New Whittington; Lowgates and Woodthorpe) fell within the neighbouring North East Derbyshire seat.

Boundary changes before the 2010 general election, when the Mid Derbyshire constituency was created, meant that Chesterfield lost New Whittington to North East Derbyshire but otherwise retained its shape.

=== Current ===
Further to a local government boundary review which came into effect in May 2023, the constituency now comprises the following wards of the Borough of Chesterfield:

- Brampton East & Boythorpe; Brampton West & Loundsley Green; Brimington North; Brimington South; Brockwell; Dunston; Hasland; Linacre; Rother; Spire; Staveley Central (most); Staveley South; Walton; Whittington (part); Whittington Moor.

The boundaries were unchanged by the 2023 review of Westminster constituencies (which was based on the ward structure in place on 1 December 2020).

== History ==
Chesterfield has mainly been a Labour seat, with periods when it has been held by other parties; it was gained by the Liberal Democrats in 2001 and held by them until 2010. Chesterfield was safe seat for Labour from 1935 until 2001. Andrew Cavendish, later the Duke of Devonshire, was the National Liberal candidate at the 1945 and 1950 elections.

The seat was held in succession by two prominent Labour politicians for over 35 years. The former Labour cabinet minister Eric Varley held the seat from October 1964 to January 1984, and was succeeded by his ex-government colleague Tony Benn, who held the seat following a by-election in March 1984. He remained the town's MP until his retirement from the House of Commons in 2001, when he famously remarked that his decision was taken to "spend more time on politics". Benn had been a Labour Cabinet Minister between 1966–70 and 1974–1979, while Varley was in the Wilson and Callaghan cabinets in the latter period. Paul Holmes gained the seat for the Liberal Democrats at the 2001 general election, the party's first Commons seat in the East Midlands, but were narrowly defeated at the 2010 by the Labour candidate Toby Perkins, one of only three seats the Labour Party gained at the 2010 general election. In 2015, a collapse in the Liberal Democrat vote nationwide had them fall behind to fourth place, the Conservatives move into second place, and Labour having their largest majority in the seat since 1979.

== Members of Parliament ==
Derbyshire East prior to 1885

Year	Member	Party
1885	Alfred Barnes	Liberal
1886	Alfred Barnes	Liberal Unionist
1892	Thomas Bayley	Liberal
1906	James Haslam	Lib-Lab
1910	James Haslam	Labour
1913 by-election	Barnet Kenyon	Lib-Lab
1918	Barnet Kenyon	Liberal
1929	George Benson	Labour
1931	Roger Conant	Conservative
1935	George Benson	Labour
1964	Eric Varley	Labour
1984 by-election	Tony Benn	Labour
2001	Paul Holmes	Liberal Democrat
2010	Toby Perkins	Labour

== Election results ==
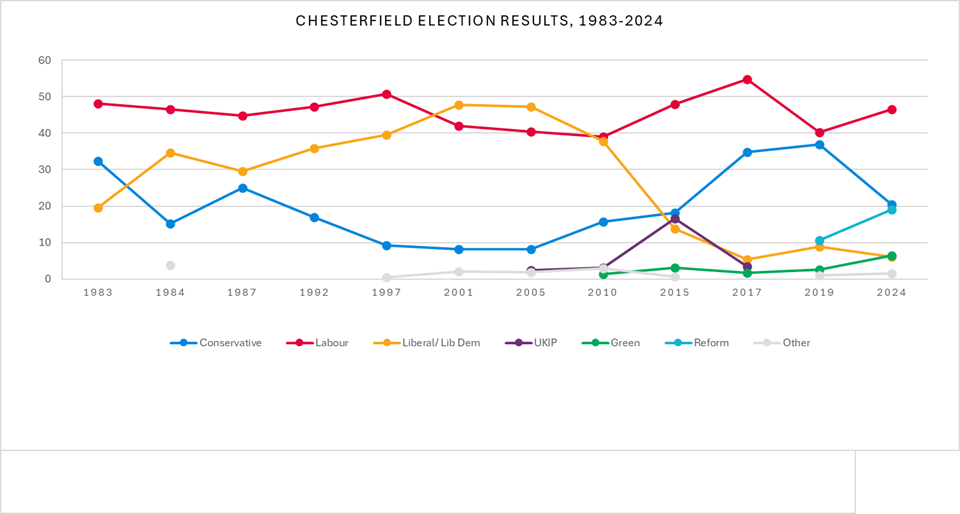
Chesterfield election results 1983–2024

=== Elections in the 2020s ===
General election 2024: Chesterfield
Party	Candidate	Votes	%	±%
Labour	Toby Perkins	19,316	46.5	+6.3
Conservative	Ben Flook	8,496	20.4	−16.6
Reform	Dan Price	7,897	19.0	+8.4
Green	David Wadsworth	2,682	6.5	+4.0
Liberal Democrats	Ian Barfield	2,553	6.1	−2.7
Chesterfield and North Derbyshire Independent	Kris Stone	363	0.9	New
Workers Party	Julie Lowe	248	0.6	New
Majority		10,820	26.1	+22.9
Turnout		41,555	58.0	−5.6
Registered electors		71,654		
Labour hold		Swing	+11.5	

=== Elections in the 2010s ===
General election 2019: Chesterfield
Party	Candidate	Votes	%	±%
Labour	Toby Perkins	18,171	40.2	−14.6
Conservative	Leigh Higgins	16,720	37.0	+2.2
Brexit Party	John Scotting	4,771	10.6	New
Liberal Democrats	Emily Coy	3,985	8.8	+3.4
Green	Neil Jackson	1,148	2.5	+0.9
Independent	John Daramy	391	0.9	New
Majority		1,451	3.2	−16.8
Turnout		45,186	63.6	−3.3
Labour hold		Swing	−8.4	

General election 2017: Chesterfield
Party	Candidate	Votes	%	±%
Labour	Toby Perkins	26,266	54.8	+6.9
Conservative	Spencer Pitfield	16,661	34.8	+16.7
Liberal Democrats	Tom Snowdon	2,612	5.4	−8.4
UKIP	Stuart Bent	1,611	3.4	−13.1
Green	David Wadsworth	777	1.6	−1.4
Majority		9,605	20.0	−9.8
Turnout		47,927	66.9	+3.7
Labour hold		Swing	−4.9	

General election 2015: Chesterfield
Party	Candidate	Votes	%	±%
Labour	Toby Perkins	21,829	47.9	+8.9
Conservative	Mark Vivis	8,231	18.1	+2.3
UKIP	Stuart Yeowart	7,523	16.5	+13.4
Liberal Democrats	Julia Cambridge	6,301	13.8	−24.0
Green	Matthew Genn	1,352	3.0	+1.7
TUSC	Matt Whale	202	0.4	New
Peace	Tommy Holgate	129	0.3	New
Majority		13,598	29.8	+28.6
Turnout		45,567	63.2	−0.6
Labour hold		Swing	+3.3	

At the 2015 general election, this seat was the 25th most marginal constituency in Great Britain, the Liberal Democrats requiring a swing from Labour of 0.6% to take the seat (based on the result of the 2010 general election).

General election 2010: Chesterfield
Party	Candidate	Votes	%	±%
Labour	Toby Perkins	17,891	39.0	−1.6
Liberal Democrats	Paul Holmes	17,342	37.8	−9.1
Conservative	Carolyn Abbott	7,214	15.7	+7.5
UKIP	David Phillips	1,432	3.1	+0.9
English Democrat	Ian Jerram	1,213	2.6	+0.8
Green	Duncan Kerr	600	1.3	New
Independent	John "Noneoftheabove" Daramy	147	0.3	New
Majority		549	1.2	N/A
Turnout		45,839	63.8	+3.8
Labour gain from Liberal Democrats		Swing	+3.8	

=== Elections in the 2000s ===
General election 2005: Chesterfield
Party	Candidate	Votes	%	±%
Liberal Democrats	Paul Holmes	20,875	47.3	−0.5
Labour	Simon Rich	17,830	40.4	−1.6
Conservative	Mark Kreling	3,605	8.2	+0.1
UKIP	Christopher Brady	997	2.3	New
English Democrat	Ian Jerram	814	1.8	New
Majority		3,045	6.9	+1.1
Turnout		44,121	59.6	−1.1
Liberal Democrats hold		Swing	+0.6	

General election 2001: Chesterfield
Party	Candidate	Votes	%	±%
Liberal Democrats	Paul Holmes	21,249	47.8	+8.2
Labour	Reg Race	18,663	42.0	−8.8
Conservative	Simon Hitchcock	3,613	8.1	−1.1
Socialist Alliance	Jeannie Robinson	437	1.0	New
Socialist Labour	Bill Harrison	295	0.7	New
Independent	Christopher Rawson	184	0.4	New
Majority		2,586	5.8	N/A
Turnout		44,441	60.7	−10.2
Liberal Democrats gain from Labour		Swing	+8.6	

=== Elections in the 1990s ===
General election 1997: Chesterfield
Party	Candidate	Votes	%	±%
Labour	Tony Benn	26,105	50.8	+3.5
Liberal Democrats	Anthony Rogers	20,330	39.6	+3.8
Conservative	Martin Potter	4,752	9.2	−7.7
Independent	Norman Scarth	202	0.4	New
Majority		5,775	11.2	−0.3
Turnout		51,389	70.9	−7.2
Labour hold		Swing	−0.1	

General election 1992: Chesterfield
Party	Candidate	Votes	%	±%
Labour	Tony Benn	26,461	47.3	+2.4
Liberal Democrats	Anthony Rogers	20,047	35.8	+6.2
Conservative	PG Lewis	9,473	16.9	−8.1
Majority		6,414	11.5	−3.8
Turnout		55,981	78.1	+1.4
Labour hold		Swing	−1.9	

=== Elections in the 1980s ===
General election 1987: Chesterfield
Party	Candidate	Votes	%	±%
Labour	Tony Benn	24,532	44.9	−3.2
Liberal	Anthony Rogers	15,955	29.6	+10.1
Conservative	Ronald Grant	13,472	25.0	−7.4
Majority		8,577	15.3	−0.4
Turnout		53,959	76.7	+4.1
Labour hold		Swing	−6.6	

1984 Chesterfield by-election
Party	Candidate	Votes	%	±%
Labour	Tony Benn	24,633	46.5	−1.6
Liberal	Max Payne	18,369	34.7	+15.2
Conservative	Nick Bourne	8,028	15.2	−17.2
Independent Labour	Bill Maynard	1,355	2.6	New
Monster Raving Loony	Screaming Lord Sutch	178	0.3	New
Independent	David Bentley	116	0.2	New
Independent	John Davey	83	0.2	New
Independent	Thomas Layton	46	0.1	New
Independent	Helen Anscombe	34	0.1	New
Independent	Jitendra Bardwaj	33	0.1	New
Independent	Donald Butler	24	0.1	New
Independent	Paul Nicholls-Jones	22	0.0	New
Independent	Sid Shaw	20	0.0	New
Independent	Christopher Hill	17	0.0	New
Independent	Giancarlo Piccaro	15	0.0	New
Independent	David Cahill	12	0.0	New
Independent	John Connell	7	0.0	New
Majority		6,264	11.8	−3.9
Turnout		52,992	76.9	+4.3
Labour hold		Swing	−8.4	

General election 1983: Chesterfield
Party	Candidate	Votes	%	±%
Labour	Eric Varley	23,881	48.1	−9.3
Conservative	Nick Bourne	16,118	32.4	+0.2
Liberal	Max Payne	9,705	19.5	+9.1
Majority		7,763	15.7	−9.5
Turnout		49,704	72.6	−0.8
Labour hold		Swing	−4.75	

=== Elections in the 1970s ===
General election 1979: Chesterfield
Party	Candidate	Votes	%	±%
Labour	Eric Varley	31,049	57.4	−2.5
Conservative	S. Hill	17,445	32.2	+6.3
Liberal	Max Payne	5,617	10.4	−3.8
Majority		13,604	25.2	−8.8
Turnout		54,111	73.4	+0.8
Labour hold		Swing	−4.4	

General election October 1974: Chesterfield
Party	Candidate	Votes	%	±%
Labour	Eric Varley	30,953	59.9	+5.1
Conservative	J. D. Taylor	13,393	25.9	−1.7
Liberal	M. W. Brown	7,349	14.2	−3.4
Majority		17,560	34.0	+6.8
Turnout		51,695	72.6	−7.5
Labour hold		Swing	+3.4	

General election February 1974: Chesterfield
Party	Candidate	Votes	%	±%
Labour	Eric Varley	31,040	54.8	−4.2
Conservative	J. D. Taylor	15,644	27.6	−3.9
Liberal	M. W. Brown	9,937	17.6	+8.1
Majority		15,396	27.2	−0.3
Turnout		56,621	80.1	+7.7
Labour hold		Swing	−0.15	

General election 1970: Chesterfield
Party	Candidate	Votes	%	±%
Labour	Eric Varley	30,386	59.0	−2.6
Conservative	John C Ramsden	16,217	31.5	+5.2
Liberal	Terence D Bamford	4,891	9.5	−2.7
Majority		14,169	27.5	−7.8
Turnout		51,494	72.4	−4.3
Labour hold		Swing	−3.9	

=== Elections in the 1960s ===
General election 1966: Chesterfield
Party	Candidate	Votes	%	±%
Labour	Eric Varley	31,542	61.6	+5.1
Conservative	Alan T Hale	13,443	26.3	−2.4
Liberal	Terence D. Bamford	6,227	12.2	−2.6
Majority		18,099	35.3	+7.5
Turnout		51,212	76.7	−2.1
Labour hold		Swing	+3.75	

General election 1964: Chesterfield
Party	Candidate	Votes	%	±%
Labour	Eric Varley	29,452	56.5	−0.1
Conservative	William G Blake	14,944	28.7	−3.0
Liberal	Derek A McKie	7,738	14.8	+3.0
Majority		14,508	27.8	+2.9
Turnout		52,134	78.8	−3.9
Labour hold		Swing	+1.49	

=== Elections in the 1950s ===
General election 1959: Chesterfield
Party	Candidate	Votes	%	±%
Labour	George Benson	30,534	56.6	−1.0
National Liberal	James Anthony Lemkin	17,084	31.7	−10.7
Liberal	Geoffrey R. Smedley-Stevenson	6,360	11.8	New
Majority		13,450	24.9	+9.6
Turnout		53,978	82.7	+2.8
Labour hold		Swing	+4.85	

General election 1955: Chesterfield
Party	Candidate	Votes	%	±%
Labour	George Benson	29,602	57.7	−6.0
National Liberal	Frank Hadfield	21,748	42.4	+6.1
Majority		7,854	15.3	−12.1
Turnout		51,350	79.9	−4.3
Labour hold		Swing	−6.05	

General election 1951: Chesterfield
Party	Candidate	Votes	%	±%
Labour	George Benson	34,753	63.7	+2.9
National Liberal	John F. Nash	19,776	36.3	+5.4
Majority		14,977	27.4	−2.5
Turnout		54,529	84.2	−2.8
Labour hold		Swing	+1.25	

General election 1950: Chesterfield
Party	Candidate	Votes	%	±%
Labour	George Benson	33,914	60.8	−2.0
National Liberal	Andrew Cavendish	17,231	30.9	−6.3
Liberal	John William O'Neill	4,052	7.3	New
Communist	Bas Barker	554	1.0	New
Majority		16,683	29.9	+4.2
Turnout		55,751	87.0	+9.6
Labour hold		Swing	+2.15	

=== Elections in the 1940s ===
General election 1945: Chesterfield
Party	Candidate	Votes	%	±%
Labour	George Benson	29,459	62.8	+11.9
Conservative	Andrew Cavendish	17,424	37.2	−2.1
Majority		12,035	25.6	+14.0
Turnout		46,883	77.4	−2.4
Labour hold		Swing	+7.0	

General Election 1939–40:

Another general election was required to take place before the end of 1940. The political parties had been making preparations for an election to take place from 1939 and by the end of this year, the following candidates had been selected; *Labour: George Benson,

- Conservative:

=== Elections in the 1930s ===
General election 1935: Chesterfield
Party	Candidate	Votes	%	±%
Labour	George Benson	21,439	50.94	
Conservative	Roger Conant	16,555	39.33	
Liberal	Robert George Hill	4,096	9.73	New
Majority		4,884	11.61	N/A
Turnout		40,072	79.78	
Labour gain from Conservative		Swing		

General election 1931: Chesterfield
Party	Candidate	Votes	%	±%
Conservative	Roger Conant	23,026	57.46	
Labour	George Benson	17,046	42.54	
Majority		5,980	14.92	N/A
Turnout		40,072	80.02	
Conservative gain from Labour		Swing		

=== Elections in the 1920s ===
General election 1929: Chesterfield
Party	Candidate	Votes	%	±%
Labour	George Benson	20,296	54.1	+14.4
Unionist	Roger Conant	9,915	26.4	New
Liberal	Harry Cropper	7,329	19.5	−40.8
Majority		10,381	27.7	N/A
Turnout		37,540	77.8	+13.4
Registered electors		48,278		
Labour gain from Liberal		Swing	+27.6	

General election 1924: Chesterfield
Party	Candidate	Votes	%	±%
Liberal	Barnet Kenyon	13,971	60.3	+9.4
Labour	George Benson	9,206	39.7	+13.8
Majority		4,765	20.6	−4.4
Turnout		23,177	64.4	−4.6
Registered electors		35,989		
Liberal hold		Swing	−2.2	

Barnet Kenyon

General election 1923: Chesterfield
Party	Candidate	Votes	%	±%
Liberal	Barnet Kenyon	12,164	50.9	N/A
Labour	George Benson	6,198	25.9	New
Unionist	R F H Broomhead-Colton-Fox	5,541	23.2	New
Majority		5,966	25.0	N/A
Turnout		23,903	69.0	N/A
Registered electors		34,648		
Liberal hold		Swing	N/A	

General election 1922: Chesterfield
Party	Candidate	Votes	%	±%
Liberal	Barnet Kenyon	Unopposed		
Liberal hold				

=== Elections in the 1910s ===
General election 1918: Chesterfield
Party	Candidate	Votes	%	±%
Liberal	Barnet Kenyon	Unopposed		
Liberal hold				

Kenyon

1913 Chesterfield by-election
Party	Candidate	Votes	%	±%
Lib-Lab	Barnet Kenyon	7,725	55.8	−3.2
Unionist	Edward Christie	5,539	40.0	−1.0
Independent Labour	John Scurr	583	4.2	New
Majority		2,186	15.8	−2.2
Turnout		13,847	81.5	+5.6
Registered electors		16,995		
Lib-Lab gain from Labour		Swing	−1.1	

General election December 1910: Chesterfield
Party	Candidate	Votes	%	±%
Labour	James Haslam	7,283	59.0	−0.1
Conservative	W.G.W. Radford	5,055	41.0	+0.1
Majority		2,228	18.0	−0.2
Turnout		12,338	75.9	−9.8
Registered electors		16,248		
Labour hold		Swing	−0.1	

General election January 1910: Chesterfield
Party	Candidate	Votes	%	±%
Labour	James Haslam	8,234	59.1	+2.6
Conservative	W.G.W. Radford	5,693	40.9	−2.6
Majority		2,541	18.2	+5.2
Turnout		13,927	85.7	+0.5
Registered electors		16,248		
Labour gain from Lib-Lab		Swing	+2.6	

=== Elections in the 1900s ===
General election 1906: Chesterfield
Party	Candidate	Votes	%	±%
Lib-Lab	James Haslam	7,254	56.5	+3.1
Conservative	Godfrey Locker-Lampson	5,590	43.5	−3.1
Majority		1,664	13.0	+6.2
Turnout		12,844	85.2	+1.1
Registered electors		15,077		
Lib-Lab hold		Swing	+3.1	

General election 1900: Chesterfield
Party	Candidate	Votes	%	±%
Liberal	Thomas Bayley	5,418	53.4	+2.0
Conservative	A. W. Byron	4,729	46.6	−2.0
Majority		689	6.8	+4.0
Turnout		10,147	84.1	−1.3
Registered electors		12,069		
Liberal hold		Swing	+2.0	

=== Elections in the 1890s ===
General election 1895: Chesterfield
Party	Candidate	Votes	%	±%
Liberal	Thomas Bayley	4,572	51.4	+0.3
Conservative	A. W. Byron	4,325	48.6	−0.3
Majority		247	2.8	+0.6
Turnout		8,897	85.4	+4.8
Registered electors		10,413		
Liberal hold		Swing	+0.3	

General election 1892: Chesterfield
Party	Candidate	Votes	%	±%
Liberal	Thomas Bayley	4,249	51.1	+1.9
Liberal Unionist	Alfred Barnes	4,067	48.9	−1.9
Majority		182	2.2	N/A
Turnout		8,316	80.6	−0.9
Registered electors		10,313		
Liberal gain from Liberal Unionist		Swing	+1.9	

=== Elections in the 1880s ===
General election 1886: Chesterfield
Party	Candidate	Votes	%	±%
Liberal Unionist	Alfred Barnes	3,567	50.8	+22.1
Liberal	Thomas Bayley	3,453	49.2	+3.5
Majority		114	1.6	N/A
Turnout		7,020	81.5	−5.0
Registered electors		8,616		
Liberal Unionist gain from Liberal		Swing	+9.3	

General election 1885: Chesterfield
Party	Candidate	Votes	%	±%
Liberal	Alfred Barnes	3,408	45.7	
Conservative	John Cumming Macdona	2,136	28.7	
Independent Liberal-Labour	James Haslam	1,907	25.6	
Majority		1,272	17.0	
Turnout		7,451	86.5	
Registered electors		8,616		
Liberal win (new seat)				

== See also ==
- 1913 Chesterfield by-election
- List of parliamentary constituencies in Derbyshire
