= Poolsbrook =

Village in Derbyshire, England

Coordinates: 53.258°N 1.340°W

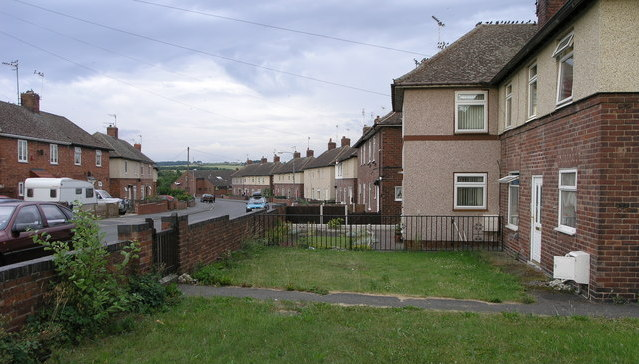
- Poolsbrook.

- Location within Derbyshire
- OS grid reference: SK442736
- Civil parish: Staveley
- District: Chesterfield
- Shire county: Derbyshire
- Region: East Midlands
- Country: England
- Sovereign state: United Kingdom
- Post town: Chesterfield
- Postcode district: S43
- Dialling code: 01246
- Police: Derbyshire
- Fire: Derbyshire
- Ambulance: East Midlands
- UK Parliament: Chesterfield

Poolsbrook (grid reference SK442736) is a former mining village near Staveley in Chesterfield, England. The village was built by Staveley Coal and Iron Company towards the end of the 19th century to provide housing for workers employed at the nearby Speedwell and the later Ireland Collieries. Since then new houses have been built (dubbed the "new village" by locals) and the old houses have been knocked down.

== Local power ==
A large number of residents signed up to have their heating and electricity supplied by landfill gas powered CHP. However, due to a lack of council support the scheme did not go ahead. Poolsbrook is part of Staveley Town council, which is part of Chesterfield Borough Council. They have local elections to elect councillors on both of these councils. Many residents vote for the Labour Party and Labour has been in power over Poolsbrook for many years.
