= Henry Strutt, 2nd Baron Belper =

British businessman, courtier and politician

The Right Honourable The Lord Belper PC JP DL
- Strutt in 1880

Captain of the Honourable Corps of Gentlemen-at-Arms
- In office 16 July 1895 – 4 December 1905
- Monarchs: Victoria; Edward VII
- Prime Minister: The Marquess of Salisbury; Arthur Balfour
- Preceded by: The Earl of Chesterfield
- Succeeded by: The Earl Beauchamp

Personal details
- Born: 20 May 1840 St Helen's House, Derby, Derbyshire
- Died: 26 July 1914 (aged 74) Kingston Hall, Nottinghamshire
- Party: Liberal; Liberal Unionist
- Spouse: Lady Margaret Coke (m. 1874)
- Education: Trinity College, Cambridge

Henry Strutt, 2nd Baron Belper, PC, JP, DL (20 May 1840 – 26 July 1914), styled The Honourable Henry Strutt between 1856 and 1880, was a British businessman, courtier and politician. Initially a Liberal, he left the party over Irish Home Rule and later held office as Captain of the Honourable Corps of Gentlemen-at-Arms from 1895 to 1905 in the Unionist administrations headed by Lord Salisbury and Arthur Balfour.

== Background and education ==
Henry Strutt was born at St Helen's House, Derby, Derbyshire, the son of Edward Strutt, 1st Baron Belper, and his wife, Amelia Harriet Otter. He was educated at Harrow and Trinity College, Cambridge, from which he held the degrees of LLB and MA. In 1862 he played cricket for Cambridge University and from 1863 to 1865 for Marylebone Cricket Club (MCC) against the universities. He became president of the family cotton business W. G. & J. Strutt.

== Capture by pirates ==
Whilst on a hunting expedition with Lord John Hervey and Mr Coore he visited Astakos. They went to a more remote area in search of animals to shoot. Not expecting an encounter with brigands, they had not arranged for an escort of gendarmes on this occasion. Having been captured, the pirates agreed to release two of them with a ransome demand. Mr Coore was chosen by lot to remain a captive. Strutt and Hervey were released on parole with a demand for £3,000 in gold to secure Mr Coore's release. They returned with the support of HMS Chanticleer which remained out of sight while the release of Mr Coore was negotiated.

== Political career ==
Initially a Liberal, Strutt was elected Member of Parliament for East Derbyshire in 1868, a seat he held until 1874. At the 1880 general election he was returned for Berwick-upon-Tweed, which he represented until he succeeded his father in the barony on 30 June 1880 and entered the House of Lords.

Belper later left the Liberal Party over Irish Home Rule and joined the Liberal Unionists. When Lord Salisbury formed his last administration in 1895, Belper was sworn of the Privy Council and appointed Captain of the Honourable Corps of Gentlemen-at-Arms, a post he held until the fall of the government in 1905, the last three years under the premiership of Arthur Balfour.

Belper was also an Aide-de-Camp to Queen Victoria, Edward VII and George V between 1894 and 1914. He was also a lieutenant-colonel in the South Nottinghamshire Yeomanry, a justice of the peace for Derbyshire, Leicestershire and Nottinghamshire and a deputy lieutenant of Nottinghamshire.

== Family ==
Belper married Lady Margaret Coke, daughter of Thomas Coke, 2nd Earl of Leicester, at Holkham, Norfolk, on 2 May 1874. They had three sons and five daughters:

- William Strutt (8 February 1875 – 5 October 1898).
- Norah Strutt (17 June 1876 – 14 September 1948) married, Major Robert Lee Morris, son of General Morris, on 20 November 1911. Secondly, Reverend Joseph David Samuel Parry-Evans, son of Major Samuel Evans, in 1920.
- Lilian Strutt (31 October 1877 – 22 February 1956) married Vernon Austen Malcolmson on 10 January 1901.
- Hilda Strutt (25 May 1879 – 28 April 1923) married Charles Israel Loraine Allix on 23 October 1906.
- Reginald Edward Strutt (12 July 1881 – 10 May 1888).
- Algernon Henry Strutt, 3rd Baron Belper (6 May 1883 – 20 May 1956).
- Margaret Strutt (4 February 1886 – 23 April 1980).
- Muriel Strutt (30 October 1890 – 8 August 1976) married Major Frank Haultain Hornsby, son of lieutenant-colonel Henry Francis Hornsby, on 30 November 1916.

Belper died at Kingston Hall, Nottinghamshire, in July 1914, aged 74, and was succeeded in the barony by his third but eldest surviving son, Algernon.

Parliament of the United Kingdom
New constituency	Member of Parliament for East Derbyshire; 1868–1874; With: Francis Egerton	Succeeded by Francis Arkwright; Francis Egerton
Preceded by David Milne Home; Dudley Marjoribanks	Member of Parliament for Berwick-upon-Tweed; April 1880 – June 1880; With: Dudley Marjoribanks	Succeeded by David Milne Home; Dudley Marjoribanks
Political offices
Preceded by The Earl of Chesterfield	Captain of the Honourable Corps of Gentlemen-at-Arms; 1895–1905	Succeeded by The Earl Beauchamp
Peerage of the United Kingdom
Preceded by Edward Strutt	Baron Belper; 1880–1914	Succeeded by Algernon Strutt
