= Thomas Bayley (politician) =

British politician

Thomas Bayley

Thomas Bayley (3 June 1846 – 11 Mar 1906) was a Liberal Party politician in England who served as a member of parliament (MP) from 1892 to 1906.

He unsuccessfully contested the 1885 general election in Barkston Ash, and at the 1886 election he stood in Chesterfield, where he was narrowly beaten by the sitting Liberal Unionist MP, Alfred Barnes. At the 1892 general election he unseated Barnes by a majority of 182 votes, and held the seat with slightly increased majorities at subsequent elections until he stood down at the 1906 general election.

He married Annie Mary Bradley Farmer (1850–1904), daughter of Nottingham musician Henry Farmer, in 1874 They had nine children:

- Ethel Readett Bayley (1872–1875)
- Emily Mildred Bayley (1874–1877)
- Marguerite Bayley (b.1875)
- Thomas Harold Readdett Bayley (1876–1937)
- Sir Henry Dennis Readett Bayley (1878–1940)
- Muriel Katherine Bayley (1880–1933)
- Annie Katherine Bayley (1881–1933)
- Thomas Charles Bayley (1883–1958)
- Hester Theodora Bayley (b.1887)

He died aged 59 in March 1906, two months after the 1906 election.

Parliament of the United Kingdom
Preceded by Alfred Barnes	Member of Parliament for Chesterfield; 1892–1906	Succeeded by James Haslam
