= George Benson (British politician) =

British politician (1889-1973)

Benson in 1959.

Sir George Benson (3 May 1889 – 17 August 1973) was a British Labour Party politician.

The son of T. D. Benson, treasurer of the Independent Labour Party (ILP), George was educated at Manchester Grammar School, Manchester and became clerk in an estate office. During the First World War he was imprisoned as a conscientious objector. He served as Member of Parliament (MP) for Chesterfield from 1929 to 1931, and from 1935 to 1964 and was knighted in 1958. George was the grandfather of Paddy Benson.

Benson wrote on financial matters and authored a book on the history of socialism. He was chairman of the Howard League for Penal Reform and a member of the Home Office Advisory Council on delinquency.

== Death ==
He died in Surrey in 1973, aged 83.

Parliament of the United Kingdom
Preceded by Barnet Kenyon	Member of Parliament for Chesterfield; 1929–1931	Succeeded by Sir Roger Conant
Preceded by Sir Roger Conant	Member of Parliament for Chesterfield; 1935–1964	Succeeded by Eric Varley
Party political offices
Preceded by Philip Snowden	Treasurer of the Independent Labour Party; 1923	Succeeded by Charles Roden Buxton
