= Coton House =

Country house in Warwickshire, England

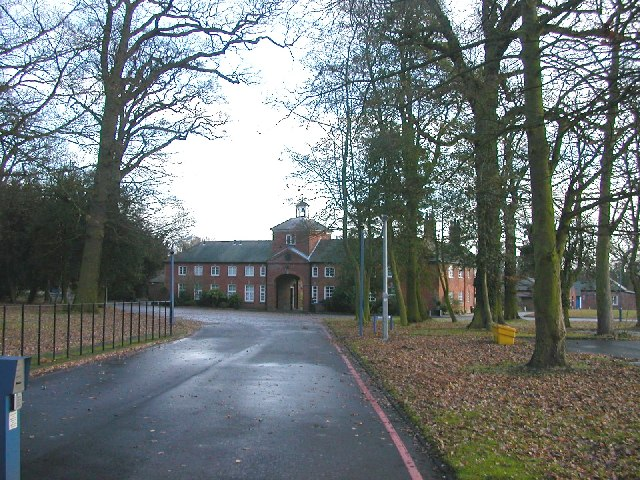
- Stableblock
- Interactive map of Coton House
- 52.411185°N 1.235174°W
- Location: Churchover, Warwickshire, England

Listed Building – Grade II*
- Official name: Coton House
- Designated: 4 December 1951
- Reference no.: 1276617

Listed Building – Grade II
- Official name: Coton House: Stableblock approximately 200 metres west
- Designated: 9 February 1976
- Reference no.: 1233436

Coton House is a late 18th-century country house at Churchover, near Rugby, Warwickshire in England. It is a Grade II* listed building.

== History ==
The Manor of Coton was held before the Dissolution of the Monasteries by the monks of Coombe Abbey. In 1551 the estate was sold to the Dixwell family and a moated manor house was built on the monastic remains. On the death of Sir William Dixwell in 1757 the estate passed to his nephew William Dixwell Grimes, whose son Abraham Grimes in 1787 replaced the old manor house with the present house built to designs by architect Samuel Wyatt.

The two-storey sandstone house has an interesting entrance front, the central three bays being bowed to full height.

In 1874 the estate, then 10,000 acres (40 km^{2}), was sold to Francis Arkwright. Much of the land was sold and in 1881 the house was let out to Arthur James. His widow Venetia bought it in 1936. After her death it was converted in 1948 for use as a corporate training centre and staff hostel. From 1948 to 1968, Coton House served as a hostel for apprentices and students employed by a nearby Rugby industrial company (initially BTH which was part of the AEI group, and which was taken over by GEC in 1967).

Coton House was bought by the Royal Mail in 1970, and used as its management training centre.

Just after 7.30 am on Tuesday 22 June 2010 a fire broke out in the first floor and roofspace of Mansion House at Coton House and burnt it out. The smoke could be seen for miles away. More than 50 firemen were despatched from 12 fire crews across Warwickshire and Northamptonshire to fight the fire. By mid-afternoon that same day, it was brought under control.

In 2012, the estate was sold to a property developer; by 2014, plans had been drawn up to convert the main building into four residences, and build sixty new homes in the grounds.

However, by 2017, the rebuilding plans for the main building had been changed, and it was restored as a single residence. As of 2025, it is on the market for £5.5m.
