= Overslade =

Area of Rugby, Warwickshire, England

Coordinates: 52.361°N 1.274°W

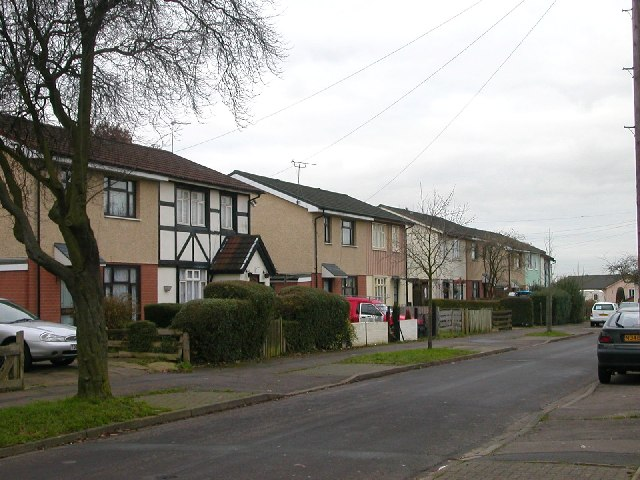
Houses on Saunton Road on the Overslade estate

Overslade is a residential area in the central south part of the town of Rugby, Warwickshire. The area was developed for housing in the 20th century, mostly between the 1930s and late-1950s. It was historically within the parish of Bilton.

The local council built a large number of prefabricated steel-clad BISF houses in Overslade in the late-1940s to solve a local housing shortage after World War II, which led to the area gaining the nickname of 'tin town', although most of these houses have been refurbished in recent years, with their steel cladding removed or covered. A common misconception exists that these houses were meant to be temporary, however they were in fact designed to have the same lifespan as conventional constructions.

The local secondary school is Harris Church of England Academy. There are several parks and open spaces in the neighbourhood, the largest being the long, thin, Burnside Open Space, which runs adjacent to the Sow Brook (a tributary of the River Avon)

Overslade has a community centre.

At the time of the 2001 census, Overslade was a ward of the borough of Rugby, the ward's population in 2001 was 5,606. By 2021, the ward had its boundaries altered to include the adjacent Rokeby area and had been renamed Rokeby and Overslade which had a population of 7,699.
