= Alfred Barnes (Derbyshire politician) =

British politician

Alfred Barnes (1823 – 28 November 1901) was a British Liberal Party and later Liberal Unionist Party politician.

== Biography ==
Barnes was the youngest son of John Gorrell Barnes, of Ashgate, Derbyshire, and was educated at a private school at Worksop. He married, in 1854, Charlotte Wilson, daughter of Thomas Wilson, of Liverpool.

In 1846 he leased a large area of coal-ground in Derbyshire, and was one of the first to develop the Derbyshire coalfield. He was successful, owning one of the finest collieries in the county at the time of his death. He was also a large shareholder in several railway companies.

At the 1880 general election, he was elected as member of parliament for Derbyshire East. When that constituency was abolished in the Redistribution of Seats Act 1885, he was returned to the House of Commons for the new Chesterfield constituency.

When the Liberal Party split over the Irish Government Bill 1886, Barnes was re-elected at the 1886 general election as a Liberal Unionist, and held his seat until the 1892 general election.

In 1893 he was president of the Chesterfield and Midland Counties Institution of Engineers. He was a justice of the peace and was in 1881 appointed a Deputy Lieutenant of Derbyshire.

He died at his residence in Chesterfield 28 November 1901.

Parliament of the United Kingdom
Preceded by Francis Egerton; Francis Arkwright	Member of Parliament for Derbyshire East; 1880–1885; With: Francis Egerton	constituency abolished
New constituency	Member of Parliament for Chesterfield; 1885–1892	Succeeded by Thomas Bayley
