= Tin Town, Luton =

Area of Luton, England

Coordinates: 51.892°N 0.392°W

Tin Town
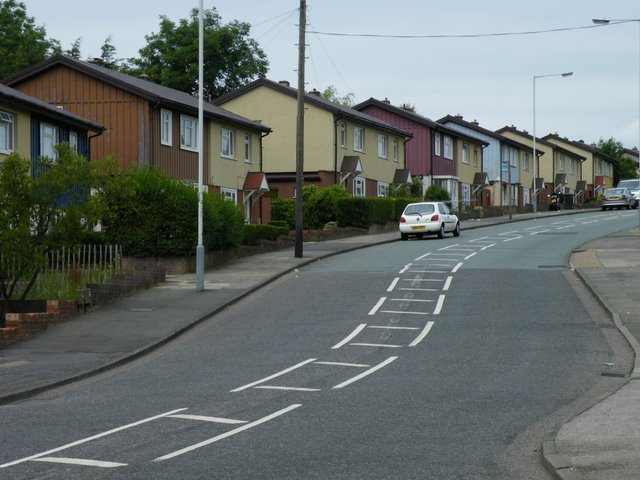
- BISF houses on Ashcroft Road, from which Tin Town derives its name

- Location within Bedfordshire
- OS grid reference: TL 10749 22741
- Unitary authority: Luton
- Ceremonial county: Bedfordshire
- Region: East
- Country: England
- Sovereign state: United Kingdom
- Post town: LUTON
- Postcode district: LU2
- Dialling code: 01582
- Police: Bedfordshire
- Fire: Bedfordshire
- Ambulance: East of England
- UK Parliament: Luton South

Tin Town is a small suburb of north-east Luton, in Bedfordshire, England. The area is roughly bounded by Moreton Road and Turners Road North to the north, Crawley Green Road to the south, Vauxhall Way to the west, and Ashcroft Road to the east. Locally known as the Steel Houses.

== History ==
After the Second World War, there was a severe shortage of accommodation and new building materials were employed in order to save both time and money. The majority were BISF Houses, which used sheetmetal for the upper parts of the construction, hence the local name for the area becoming ‘Tin Town’. Most of these houses still stand today, although in recent years the local council (or private owners) of these houses have covered the original metal with cladding, and only a few of these properties still show the original characteristic painted metal.

== Local area ==
The local area is mainly residential, although Ramridge Primary School, named after the neighbouring Ramridge End is in the area.

== Politics ==
Tin Town is part of Round Green ward, which also contains parts of Ramridge End and Round Green. The councillors for Round Green ward are Cllr David Chapman (Liberal Democrats), Cllr Mark Rivers (Labour) and Cllr Tahmina Saleem (Labour).

The ward forms part of the parliamentary constituency of Luton South and the MP is Rachel Hopkins (Labour).

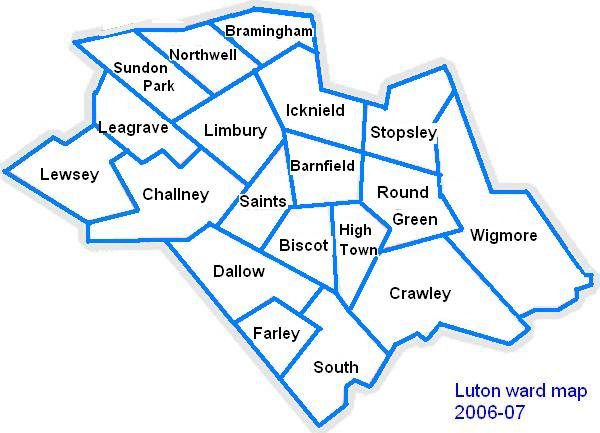
Map of Luton showing Round Green

== Local attractions ==
Key
	Abbey/Priory/Cathedral
Accessible open space	Accessible open space
	Amusement/Theme Park
	Castle
Country Park	Country Park
	English Heritage
	Forestry Commission
Heritage railway	Heritage railway
Historic house	Historic House
Places of Worship	Places of Worship
Museum (free) Museum	Museum (free/not free)
National Trust	National Trust
	Theatre
	Zoo

- Dunstable Downs
- Chiltern Hills
- Leighton Buzzard Light Railway
- Luton Museum & Art Gallery
- The hat Factory
- Luton Hoo
- Mossman Collection
- Someries castle
- Stockwood Craft Museum
- Stockwood Park
- Wardown Park
- Waulud's Bank
- Whipsnade Tree Cathedral
- Whipsnade Wildlife Park
- Woodside Farm and Wildfowl Park
- Wrest Park Gardens

== Local newspapers ==
Two weekly newspapers cover Tin Town, although they are not specific to the area.

They are the:

- Herald and Post
- Luton News
