= 1913 Chesterfield by-election =

UK parliamentary by-election

The 1913 Chesterfield by-election was a by-election held for the British House of Commons constituency of Chesterfield in Derbyshire on 20 August 1913.

== Vacancy and electoral history ==
The seat became vacant following the death of the constituency's Member of Parliament, James Haslam on 31 July 1913. Haslam had been the MP here since 1906. He was the Secretary of the Derbyshire Miners' Association who acted as his sponsor. He had been first elected to the seat as a Liberal or Lib-Lab candidate and once in parliament, took the Liberal whip. Following a decision of the Miners Federation of Great Britain to affiliate to the Labour Party, all miners sponsored MPs were requested to take the Labour whip and contest the following election as a Labour Party candidate. Haslam complied with this request and at both the January and December 1910 general elections was re-elected as a Labour Party candidate without facing a Liberal opponent.

== Kenyon's selection as candidate ==
Kenyon was a long-standing official of the Derbyshire Miners' Federation. When James Haslam announced in 1912 that he would not be standing again the Miners decided to nominate Kenyon to succeed him. Haslam died on 30 July 1913 creating a vacancy and a by-election. Although the Liberals had not opposed Haslam in 1906 or in either of the two general elections of 1910 they decided they would contest the next election and had earlier adopted Alderman George Eastwood, the President of Chesterfield Division Liberal Association. The Unionists adopted Edward Christie of Hendon and the Derbyshire Miners selected Barnet Kenyon, then treasurer of their Association and one of its most popular officials to be the Labour candidate. Kenyon's politics however can best be described as Lib-Lab and when Alderman Eastwood declined the Liberal nomination having been taken ill Kenyon soon agreed to be adopted officially by the Liberals too. This decision soon proved problematic for the Miners Federation and for the Labour and Liberal parties. The position was to be referred to the Miners' Federation of Great Britain and the Derbyshire Miners' Association. This apparent return to outright Lib-Labbery was resented by the socialists who appealed to Labour headquarters to intervene. The outcome was expected to be that if the position could not be resolved, Labour would seek to adopt a new candidate to oppose Kenyon.

== Liberal compromise ==
By 8 August, the Liberals were attempting a compromise, saying they would not formally adopt Kenyon but would rely on his nomination as the Miners' candidate in the expectation he would take the Liberal whip once elected to Parliament. In return he would be known as the Labour-Progressive member and would have full freedom to speak and vote as he wished on issues affecting mining and labour. This was seen as a climb down by many Liberals to avoid the possibility of the national Labour party putting up a rival candidate. Despite an attack on Kenyon's conduct in regard to the nomination for the by-election in the publication Labour Leader, Labour Party headquarters in London was reported to be satisfied with the Liberal Party compromise position, and at this point Ramsay MacDonald announced he would support Kenyon's candidacy. A few days later, Kenyon was being described as the 'Liberal and Labour' candidate in the press but many Liberals in Chesterfield were unhappy at the way he seemed to be ignoring the Liberal side of his programme in favour of labour and mining issues and was apparently refusing to use the word Liberal in his campaign or at his election meetings.

== The National Insurance Act controversy ==
An issue which had a direct impact on the election was the working of the National Insurance Act 1911, which came into effect in 1913. This legislation was a key component of the social reforms introduced by the Liberal government after 1908 which also included the first Old Age Pensions. The Act covered sickness, invalidity and unemployment benefits and brought real improvement in getting access to a doctor for poorer patients. However, regulations which the Insurance Commissioners (the body of civil servants responsible for administering the legislation) had introduced were believed to be adversely affecting many patients. The government had decided not to treat medical associations which were friendly societies in the same way as panel doctors, i.e. doctors agreeing to treat patients under the provisions of the Act. Most doctors who took panel patients also continued to treat private patients who paid their own costs. The panel system did not however operate in Chesterfield where the medical association performed a similar role. The decision not to put the association on an equal footing with panel doctors must have seemed to those who had insured themselves against sickness through their medical associations, a deliberate attempt to penalise the friendly societies. It could also have been viewed as an attack on the traditional Liberal concept of self-help. The Chesterfield Medical Association, a local friendly society, which was variously reported to have had 4,000 or 7,000 members many of whom were Liberal voters, were incensed at the new regulations. There was even a realistic prospect of an independent candidate being put up to fight on the health insurance issue, although negotiation with government to gain concessions was preferred and a meeting was hastily arranged at the House of Commons between a deputation from the Chesterfield Medical Association and Lloyd George the Chancellor of the Exchequer and the Financial Secretary to the Treasury Charles Masterman. While the threat of an independent medical association candidate receded, resentment remained high and the association members were urged not to vote for Kenyon.

== Socialist candidate in the field ==
Despite their earlier willingness to accept Kenyon as the Labour representative, the executive committee of the national Labour party at a meeting at their Victoria Street headquarters in London passed a resolution on 12 August 1913 repudiating Kenyon as an official Labour candidate on the grounds that he was not conducting his campaign in accordance with the Labour Party constitution. This decision caused some disquiet to Labour supporters of Kenyon in the constituency as it now seemed distinctly possible that an official Labour candidate would be put up. They were right to be concerned because on 14 August, just two days before close of nominations, a meeting of trade unionists and socialists in Chesterfield voted to put up John Scurr, Chairman of the London District Committee, Dock, Wharf, Riverside and General Labourers' Union to be Labour and Socialist candidate at the by-election. Scurr had fought a Parliamentary election as a socialist before, at South West Bethnal Green in 1911 where he came bottom of the poll by a long margin. He was to contest the same seat again in 1914 and he also fought at Ipswich in 1914. Scurr later became an Alderman on Poplar Borough Council and was imprisoned in the controversial rates case there in the 1920s. He later won a seat on the London County Council and became Labour MP for Mile End.

Ramsay MacDonald in particular had turned against Kenyon. It was reported on 15 August that he had "...virtually declared war on Mr Kenyon and the many trade unionists like him who refused to cut themselves adrift from the Liberal Party." MacDonald had written to Kenyon criticising him for trying to be both Liberal and Labour at once and the Miners' Federation were warned that nominations of candidates like Kenyon was damaging the Labour Party nationally and compromising its existence as an independent party.

== Kenyon's political manoeuvrings ==
Despite his earlier reluctance to be associated too closely with the Liberal description, it was clear that Kenyon was really an out-and-out Liberal in beliefs and bound tightly to the Liberal organisation in Chesterfield, where the Liberal chairman was the chairman of Kenyon's campaign and the Liberal agent was Kenyon's election agent. He was also claimed by the Liberal Party nationally. On 16 August he got a letter of support from the Liberal prime minister H H Asquith as well as from Lloyd George and the former Liberal candidate Alderman Eastwood spoke for him at his eve of poll meeting. So it seems likely that Kenyon's trying to distance himself from the Liberal Party earlier in the campaign was not because he was ashamed of his Liberal connections or thought they would be damaging to his prospects of election but was rather an attempt to persuade the Labour Party from looking too closely at his real affiliations. On top of this the main motive of the Derbyshire Miners was to elect a man from within their ranks to represent their interests at Westminster. They did not welcome the intrusions into their independence from Liberal or Labour organisations locally or nationally and Kenyon was probably trying to accommodate these sensibilities while obtaining the right levels of support from those best placed to help get him elected.

== Labour concerns ==
Against the background of the Liberal and Labour electoral truce in the Chesterfield constituency since 1903 and the history of Lib-Lab cooperation since the late 19th century, Liberal and Labour sympathies remained high and it was a fact that the Miners' Federation was filled with men like Kenyon who were working-class Liberals, with links to the party through nonconformity and other radical causes. Labour needed the trade unions as their industrial arm and had to fight hard against their traditional close association with the Liberal Party if Labour were to remain a viable, independent political force. There was a real fear that miners' organisations, particularly in the East Midlands could disaffiliate from Labour and revert to their earlier loyalty to the Liberal Party. At this time it was by no means inevitable that Labour would replace the Liberals as the main progressive force in the British political system, hence the disquiet when candidates like Kenyon wanted to play both Liberal and Labour cards together and as the Liberals maintained their connection with the Labour movement across Derbyshire in the 1910s and 1920s.

== Result ==
The result of the election was a triumph for Kenyon. He topped the poll with a majority of 2,186 over the Unionist candidate Edward Christie while John Scurr received only 583 votes.

Barnet Kenyon

Chesterfield by-election, 1913 Electorate 16,995
Party	Candidate	Votes	%	±%
Lib-Lab	Barnet Kenyon	7,725	55.8	−3.2
Unionist	Edward Christie	5,539	40.0	−1.0
Independent Labour	John Scurr	583	4.2	New
Majority		2,186	15.8	−2.2
Turnout		13,847	81.5	+5.6
Lib-Lab hold		Swing	-1.1	

The result was much better than Kenyon or other commentators had expected and despite all the furore his candidacy had created Kenyon seemed to have been able to appeal to all element of progressive opinion in the constituency, gaining working class mining votes as well the support of middle-class Liberals. Kenyon remained MP for Chesterfield until standing down at the 1929 general election on the grounds of declining health at the age of 76.

== The Lib-Lab problem after the by-election ==
The dispute between the Derbyshire Miners and Labour rumbled on after the poll. A meeting of the Derbyshire Miners' Council unanimously passed a resolution critical of the Labour Party stance towards Kenyon's adoption after it had first been authorised by the party and the Miners' Federation and ordered the resolution be sent to Labour headquarters for an enquiry. By December 1913, The Times was reporting that there seemed little prospect of patching up the quarrel between the Miners and the Labour Party and disaffiliation of the Miners' Federation from the party in the New Year was likely. There was some inconclusive discussion at the Miners' Federation executive meeting at Southport in January 1914 but the issue flared up again the following month when Kenyon refused to join the independent Labour group in Parliament and formally confirmed that he wished to be known as 'Liberal and Labour'. This action, which might have been anticipated given all that gone on around his candidacy in the by-election, seems to have taken the Derbyshire Miners by surprise (or perhaps presented left-wing elements within the organisation with an opportunity) because they convened a special meeting in response to Kenyon's announcement and were considering calling on him to resign his seat or sever his connections with the union, including giving up the house he occupied as an official of the Federation. According to the press report, the attack on Kenyon was being orchestrated by younger, perhaps more Labour Party oriented members and Kenyon was expected to gain his support from the older officials of the union, presumably those of more traditional and Liberal leanings. The Miners' Federation made their choice between Labour and Liberal soon afterwards when they decided that all future Parliamentary candidates endorsed by the union must fight on strictly Labour lines and while it is not clear if they called on Kenyon to stand down from the House of Commons at that point, it was implicit that they would put up another Miners' candidate against him at the next election.

== Aftermath ==
The Labour Party accepted the situation in Chesterfield and despite its initial threats never fielded a candidate against Kenyon. The success of Kenyon standing as a local miners backed Liberal candidate, had a knock-on effect elsewhere in the country. In 1914 three miners MPs who had first sat in the House as Liberals, before switching to Labour, re-took the Liberal whip. In 1914 at a further two by-elections in mining constituencies, Labour candidates finished bottom of the poll due to miners preferring to vote for Liberal candidates.

== See also ==
- 1914 North East Derbyshire by-election
- 1914 North West Durham by-election
- List of United Kingdom by-elections (1900–1918)

== Other sources ==
- The Derbyshire Miners: A Study in Industrial and Social History by James Eccles Williams, published by Allen and Unwin, 1962
- The Electoral Position of the Liberal and Labour Parties, 1910–1914, P. F. Clarke in The English Historical Review, Vol. 90, No. 357 (Oct., 1975), pp. 828–836, Oxford University Press
- Why Was There No Marxism in Great Britain?, Ross McKibbin in The English Historical Review, Vol. 99, No. 391 (Apr., 1984), pp. 297–331, Oxford University Press
- For Kenyon's involvement in the Cooperative Movement at Clown
- to see two photographic images of Kenyon in the National Portrait Gallery
