= Churchover =

Village and civil parish in Warwickshire, England

Coordinates: 52.419688°N 1.242643°W

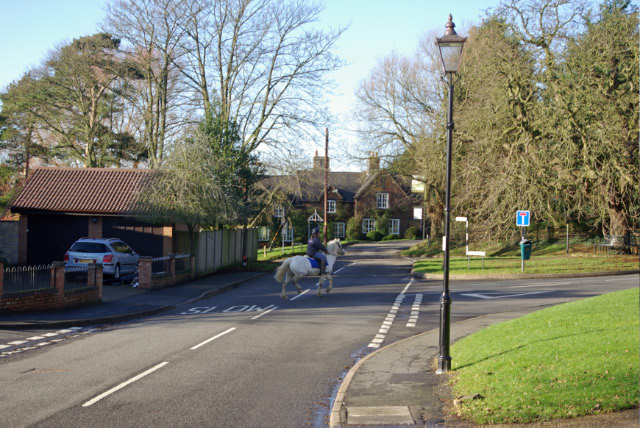
- Village centre

- Location within Warwickshire
- Population: 251 (2011)
- OS grid reference: SP5180
- Civil parish: Churchover
- District: Rugby
- Shire county: Warwickshire
- Region: West Midlands
- Country: England
- Sovereign state: United Kingdom
- Post town: RUGBY
- Postcode district: CV23
- Dialling code: 01788
- Police: Warwickshire
- Fire: Warwickshire
- Ambulance: West Midlands
- UK Parliament: Rugby

Churchover is a small village and civil parish in Warwickshire, England.

== Parish ==
The population of the parish in the 2001 census was 230, increasing to 251 at the 2011 census. It is located around 4 miles (7 km) north of Rugby, and is administratively part of the borough of Rugby. The village lies just west of the A426 road, and just north of the M6 motorway on the border with Leicestershire. It was named in the Domesday Book as Church Wavre.

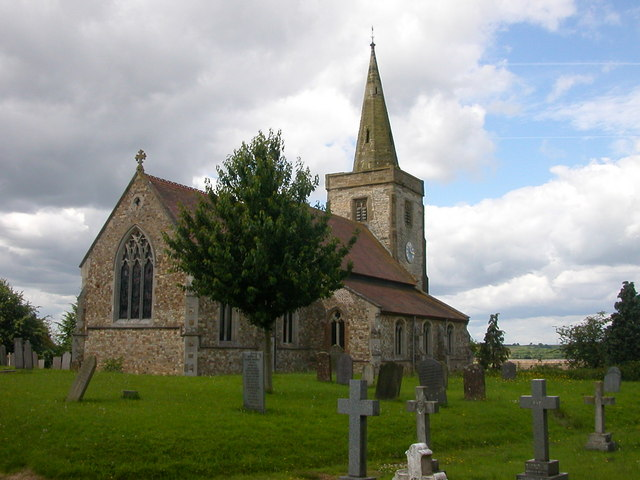
Holy Trinity church

Within the parish boundaries is Coton House, a mansion house dating from 1787. It was Grade II* listed in 1951. Royal Mail purchased the property in 1970 and used it as a training and conference centre. In 2010 the property was destroyed by fire, with the interiors becoming a blackened shell. Within five years however it had been restored to its former glory and sold to a private individual. As of 2025, it is on the market for £5.5m.

The village contains the Holy Trinity Church which dates partly from the 15th century and is a Grade II* listed building. There was a village shop and a post office, both of which have now closed. Similarly the village school closed in 1973 and children now need to go to Monks Kirby and Rugby to be educated. The school building is now a community centre.

A major gas compression station and a pipeline pigging and transfer compound was opened just south-west of the village in the 1970s. Both are part of the National transmission system.
