= Cornhill Insurance plc v Improvement Services Ltd =

UK insolvency law case concerning the presentation of a winding up petition

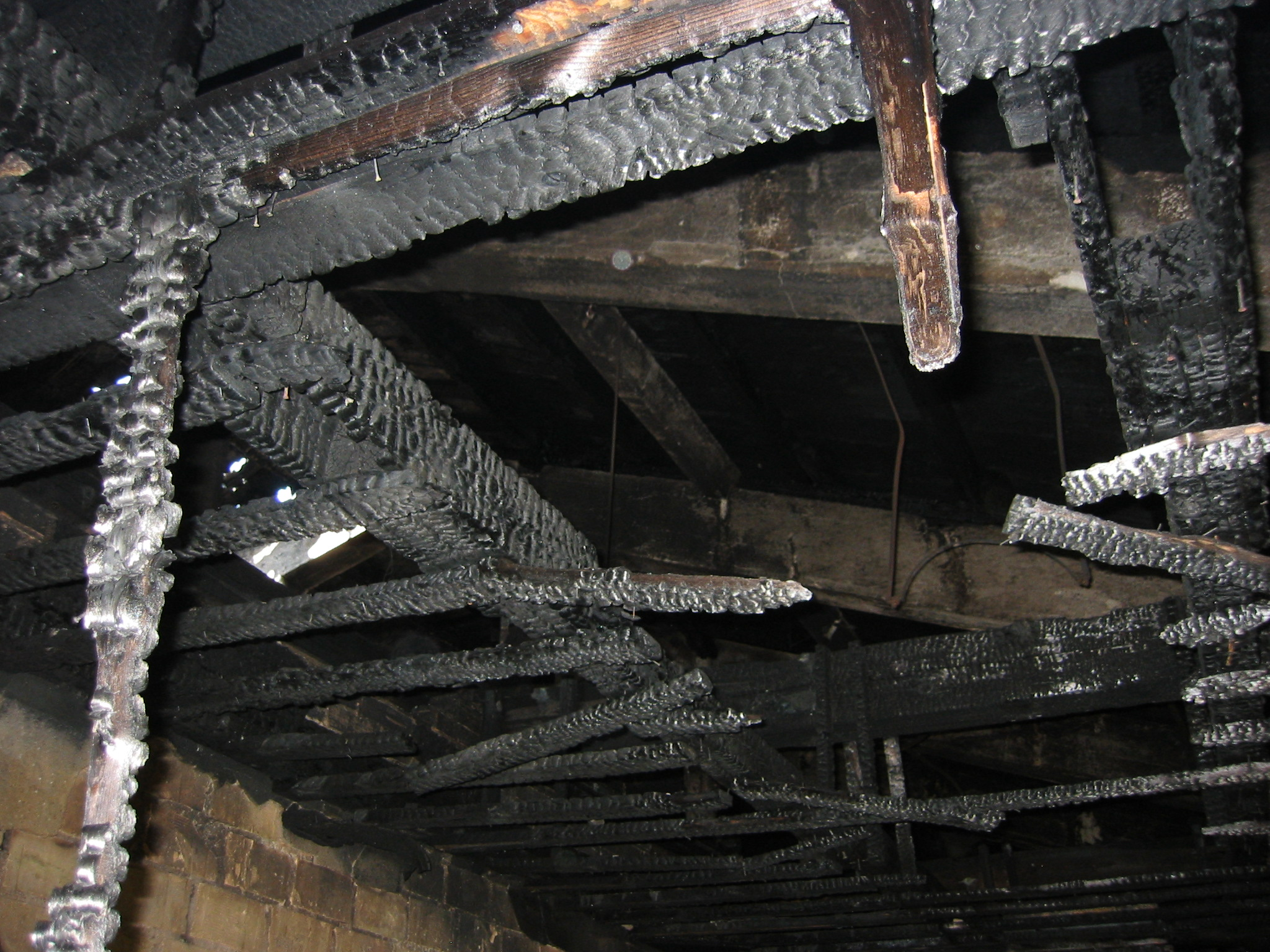
- Court: High Court, Chancery Division
- Decided: 22 July 1985
- Citation: [1986] 1 WLR 114, (1986) 2 BCC 98942

Keywords
- Winding up, inability to pay debts, abuse of process

Cornhill Insurance plc v Improvement Services Ltd [1986] 1 WLR 114 is a UK insolvency law case concerning the presentation of a winding up petition.

== Case ==
Improvement Services Ltd claimed money under an insurance policy covering damage by fire to their building from their insurers, Cornhill Insurance plc (now part of Allianz after a takeover in 1986). £65000 was paid out already under the insurance policy. The solicitors of Improvement Services Ltd agreed with the loss adjusters at Cornhill that £1,154 was owed still: for some damage to plaster and damage to an injection machine lance. But Cornhill was not paying up. The solicitors repeated demands. They were not heard. So they went to the Chancery Court and presented a petition to wind up the company on the ground that it was insolvent under the Insolvency Act 1986 ss 122(f) and 123(1)(a). Straight away Cornhill Insurance claimed that Improvement Services was engaged in frivolous, vexatious litigation and applied for an injunction to restrain the winding up petition. It brought to the court its accounts, showing how much money it had. It was granted an interim injunction, but the matter still needed to be given a full hearing on continuing the injunction.

== Judgment ==
Harman J refused the continuing injunction on the substantive hearing holding that the defendants were entitled to present a petition.

In my view the correct test in approaching these matters is exemplified first by Ungoed-Thomas J, who was a great master of equity (and I, it must be remembered, am being asked to exercise the ordinary equitable remedies, not the Companies Court remedies), in Mann v Goldstein [1968] 1 WLR 1091, 1096 where he said:

“When the creditor's debt is clearly established it seems to me to follow that this court would not, in general at any rate, interfere even though the company would appear to be solvent, for the creditor would as such be entitled to present a petition and the debtor would have his own remedy in paying the undisputed debt which he should pay. So, to persist in non-payment of the debt in such circumstances would itself either suggest inability to pay or that the application was an application that the court should give the debtor relief which it itself could provide, but would not provide, by paying the debt.”

That appears to me to be sound reasoning and sound law. I reinforce it by a reference to In re A Company (1950) 94 SJ 369 where Vaisey J, in a matter in which counsel of the utmost distinction in Chancery at that time, both leading and junior, appeared, said that where a company was well known and wealthy it was the more likely that delay in settlement of its obligations would create some suspicion of financial embarrassment:

“Rich men and rich companies who did not pay their debts had only themselves to blame if it were thought that they could not pay them.”

In my view those words apply to this case also. This is a case of a rich company which could pay an undoubted debt and has chosen — I think I must use that word — not to do so from 12 June to today. In my view in such circumstances the creditor was entitled to (a) threaten to and (b) in fact if it chose to present a winding up petition, and I was wrong to make the ex parte order which I made on 12 July and I should not accede to this motion to continue that order today.

I concede that the matter is sad and unfortunate because it may be there were other and out of court remedies which might effectively have got the money before now. Nonetheless it is my business to give people their rights, according to their proper entitlement in the law and not to force them into other courses, and in my judgment each defendant was entitled to say: “I am undoubtedly owed £1154. If You don't pay me I must suspect You can't. Therefore I can properly swear that You are insolvent and I can properly present a winding up petition to the Companies Court.” I so hold and therefore refuse to make any order on this motion in favour of the plaintiff.

Cornhill Insurance's debt was paid very sharply after this decision.

== See also ==
- Mann v Goldstein [1968] 1 WLR 1091
