= Dennis Skinner =

British politician (born 1932)

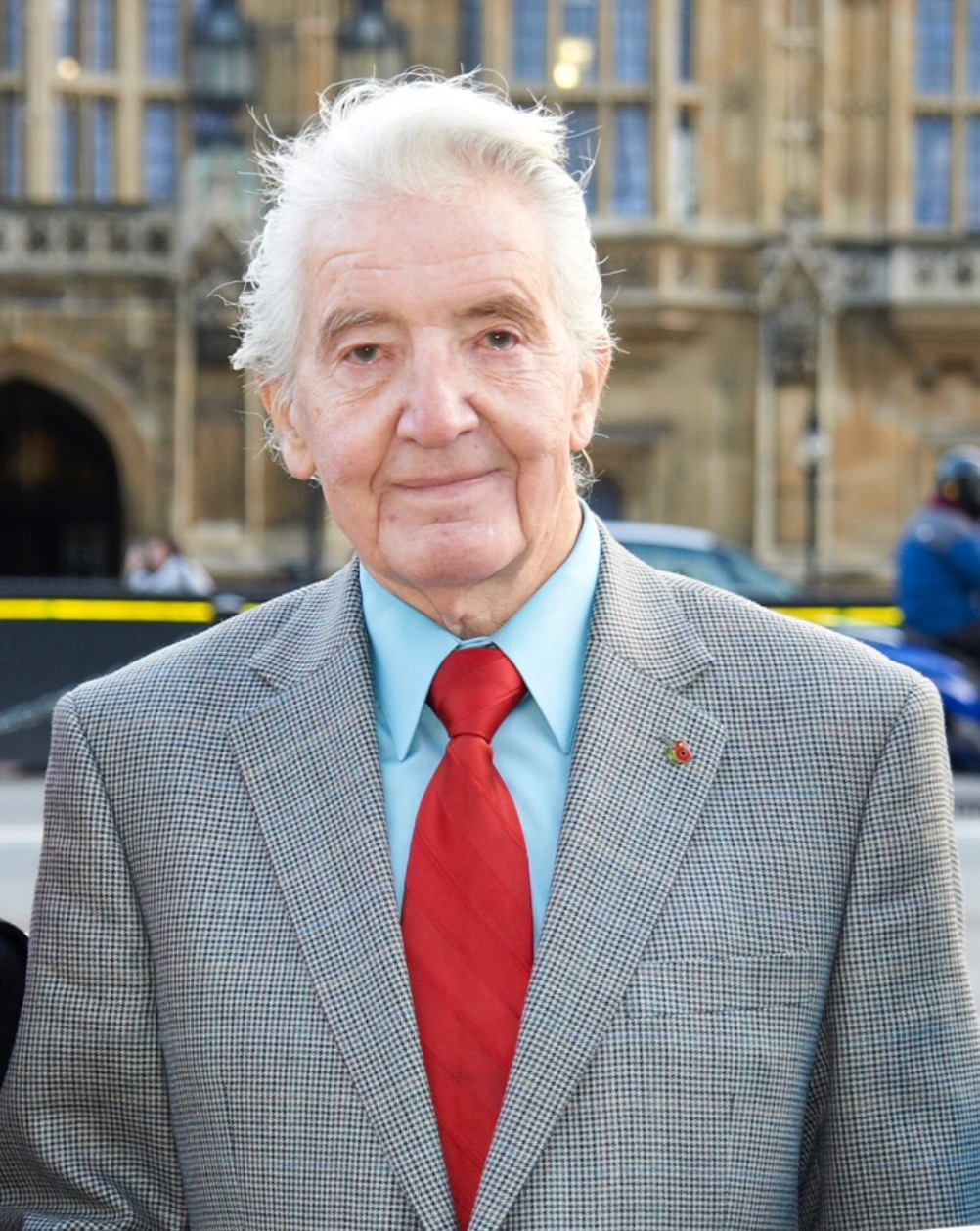
- Skinner in 2011

Honorary President of the Socialist Campaign Group
- Incumbent
- Assumed office 6 May 2020
- Preceded by: Office established

Member of Parliament for Bolsover
- In office 18 June 1970 – 6 November 2019
- Preceded by: Harold Neal
- Succeeded by: Mark Fletcher

Chair of the National Executive Committee of the Labour Party
- In office 7 October 1988 – 6 October 1989
- Leader: Neil Kinnock
- Preceded by: Neil Kinnock
- Succeeded by: Jo Richardson

President of the Derbyshire Area of the National Union of Mineworkers
- In office June 1966 – 25 June 1970
- Preceded by: Herbert Parkin
- Succeeded by: Raymond Ellis (1972)

Councillor on Clay Cross Urban District Council
- In office 1960–1970

Chairman of Clay Cross Urban District Council
- In office 1965–1970

Personal details
- Born: Dennis Edward Skinner; 11 February 1932 (age 94) Clay Cross, Derbyshire, England
- Party: Labour
- Other political affiliations: Socialist Campaign Group (1982–present)
- Spouse: Mary Parker (m. 1960; sep. 1989)
- Domestic partner: Lois Blasenheim
- Children: 3
- Education: Ruskin College
- Profession: Miner, politician
- Nickname: Beast of Bolsover
- Dennis Skinner's voice Skinner speaks to cabin crew strikers outside Parliament; Recorded 12 July 2017

Dennis Edward Skinner (born 11 February 1932) is a British politician who served as Member of Parliament (MP) for Bolsover for 49 years, from 1970 to 2019. A member of the Labour Party, he is known for his left-wing views and republican sentiments. Before entering Parliament, he worked for more than 20 years as a coal miner.

Nicknamed the "Beast of Bolsover", Skinner belonged to the Socialist Campaign Group of Labour MPs. He was a member of the National Executive Committee of the Labour Party, with brief breaks, for 30 years, and was the committee's chairman from 1988 to 1989. He was one of the longest serving members of the House of Commons and the longest continuously serving Labour MP. A lifelong Eurosceptic, Skinner voted for the UK to leave the European Union in the 2016 referendum. Skinner lost his seat at the 2019 general election to Mark Fletcher of the Conservative Party, and was succeeded as the Labour candidate for Bolsover by Natalie Fleet.

During his parliamentary career, Skinner was suspended from Parliament on at least ten occasions, usually for using unparliamentary language when attacking opponents. He was also known for regularly heckling upon the arrival of Black Rod in the House of Commons chamber during the State Opening of Parliament. During most of his tenure in the Commons (in the years when the Labour Party were in opposition), Skinner would usually sit on the first seat of the front bench below the gangway in the Commons in a tweed jacket and signature red tie. During the New Labour government from 1997 to 2010, Skinner sat in the equivalent spot on the government benches.

== Early life and career ==
Born in Clay Cross, Derbyshire, Skinner is the third of nine children. His father Edward Skinner was a coal miner who was sacked after the 1926 general strike, and his mother Lucy was a cleaner. In June 1942, at the age of 10, Skinner won a scholarship to attend Tupton Hall Grammar School after passing the eleven-plus a year early. In 1949, he went on to work as a coal miner at Parkhouse colliery, working there until its closure in 1962. He then worked at Glapwell colliery near Bolsover. In 1956 Skinner entered the Sheffield Star Walk, an amateur walking race, and finished second.

In 1966, Skinner became the youngest-ever president of the Derbyshire region of the National Union of Mineworkers. After working for 20 years as a miner, he became a member of Derbyshire County Council and a Clay Cross councillor in the 1960s. As chairman of the Clay Cross Council, Skinner was noted for his decision not to wear the traditional council dress and gold chain: "My conscience would not permit me to wear it, because I believe ... all the pomp and ceremony attached to local government [and] Parliament is outdated and a waste of time". In 1967, he attended Ruskin College, after completing a course run by the National Union of Mineworkers at the University of Sheffield. Skinner resigned from the colliery and the Derbyshire Miners' Union shortly after his election to parliament in June 1970.

== Parliamentary career (1970–2019) ==
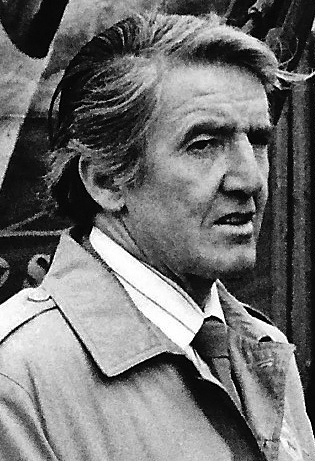
Skinner in 1992

In 1956, Skinner joined the Labour Party. He was chosen as Parliamentary Prospective candidate for Bolsover on 5 June 1969. Skinner was elected as MP for the then safe Labour seat of Bolsover at the 1970 general election, succeeding Harold Neal. He retained the seat for 49 years (receiving his highest vote share in 1970, whilst achieving his highest majority at the 1997 general election), until he lost it at the 2019 general election to Mark Fletcher of the Conservative Party.

Due to his aggressive rhetoric, Skinner became known as the "Beast of Bolsover". Skinner recalls that he earned the nickname for his behaviour in a tribute debate in the Commons following the death of former Conservative Prime Minister Sir Anthony Eden in 1977: "They were making speeches about the wonder of Anthony Eden, so I got up and talked about miners and people seriously injured and dead in the pits and the £200 given to the widow. There was booing and then all the Tories left and the papers had a go, some serious ones".

During most of his tenure in the Commons (in the years where the Labour Party were in opposition), Skinner would usually sit on the first seat of the front bench below the gangway in the Commons (known as the "Awkward Squad Bench" because it is where rebel Labour Party MPs have traditionally sat) in a tweed jacket (whilst most other MPs wear suits) and signature red tie. During the New Labour government from 1997 to 2010, Skinner sat in the equivalent spot on the government benches.

In 1979, Skinner played a role in publicly exposing Anthony Blunt as a spy for the Soviet Union. On 15 November 1979, Prime Minister Margaret Thatcher revealed Blunt's wartime role in the House of Commons in reply to questions put to her by Ted Leadbitter, the MP for Hartlepool, and Skinner. Thatcher made a full statement to the Commons on the matter the following week:

Mr. Leadbitter and Mr. Skinner: asked the Prime Minister if she will make a statement on recent evidence concerning the actions of an individual, whose name has been supplied to her, in relation to the security of the United Kingdom.

Prime Minister Margaret Thatcher: The name which the hon. Member for Hartlepool (Mr. Leadbitter) has given me is that of Sir Anthony Blunt.

On 7 June 1985, Skinner talked out a bill by Enoch Powell which would have banned stem cell research by moving the writ for the by-election in Brecon and Radnor; Skinner later described this as his proudest political moment. On 20 January 1989, he talked out a move to reduce the number of weeks at which an abortion could be legally performed in Britain by moving the writ for the Richmond by-election.

In 2003, Skinner was among the quarter of Labour MPs who voted against the Iraq War; he later rebelled against the party line when he voted against government policy to allow terror suspects to be detained without trial for up to 90 days. In 2007, Skinner and 88 other Labour MPs voted against the Labour Government's policy of renewing the Trident Nuclear Missile System.

In January 2012, Skinner was referred to as "a dinosaur" in a controversial jibe by David Cameron, who said "I often say to my children 'No need to go to the Natural History Museum to see a dinosaur, come to the House of Commons at about half past twelve'". Cameron received criticism for the remark, and was accused of ageism. Labour MPs complained at the time that Cameron's words amounted to "a gratuitous and entirely offensive insult to a greatly respected honourable Member, made entirely because of his age." House Speaker John Bercow replied at the time: "I'm always in favour of humour but just as beauty is in the eye of the beholder, humour is a matter of subjective judgment. Sometimes people are funny. Sometimes they think they are funny. Sometimes they think they are funny deliberately when they are not. Sometimes they don't realise they are funny when they are." In July 2015, Cameron referenced the dinosaur remark in another jibe in which he said "It's always very good to see the Labour Party in full voice, cheering on 'Jurassic Park'. I would stick to the movie".

In May 2014, Skinner was the principal guest speaker at the Kent Miners Rally at the Aylesham & District Social Club to commemorate 30 years since the 1984–1985 United Kingdom miners' strike.

Following the retirement of Peter Tapsell in 2015, Skinner was one of the four longest-serving MPs, but did not become Father of the House, as two other MPs, who were also first elected in 1970, had been sworn in earlier on the same day and consecutively both held that position: Gerald Kaufman (2015–2017) and Kenneth Clarke (2017–2019). The only other remaining MP from 1970 was Michael Meacher, who died within 6 months of the commencement of the 2015 Parliament. Skinner stated that in any case he would not accept the honorific title. In 2019, with Clarke's impending retirement, the issue of Skinner becoming Father of the House resurfaced, but was rendered moot when Skinner lost his seat at the 2019 general election to Mark Fletcher of the Conservative Party.

In 2017, upon Kaufman's death, 85-year-old Skinner became the oldest member of the House of Commons. When Skinner was first elected Bolsover was one of the safest Labour seats in the country, when the town still had a large mining community, but over the following half century with socioeconomic changes in the constituency Skinner's vote share dropped from 77% in 1970, still holding a high vote share of 65% in 2005, to only 36% in 2019, with the result that he lost the seat to the Conservatives by a margin of 11%. He was succeeded as the Labour candidate for Bolsover by Natalie Fleet, who became MP for the seat in the 2024 general election.

=== Views ===
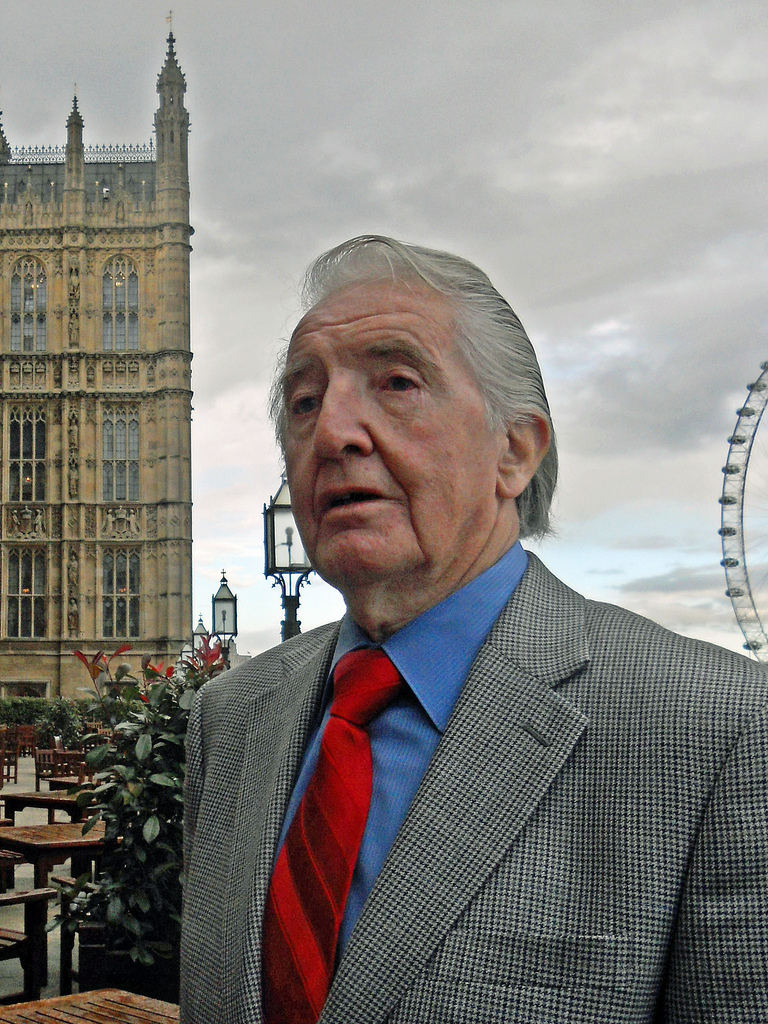
Skinner in 2011

Skinner was a strong supporter of the National Union of Mineworkers and their leader Arthur Scargill in the 1984–85 miners' strike. Skinner refused to accept a parliamentary salary in excess of miners' wages, and during the miners' strike he donated his wages to the NUM.

Skinner voted for equalisation of the age of consent, civil partnerships, adoption rights for same-sex couples, to outlaw discrimination on the grounds of sexual orientation, and for same-sex couples to marry, and has a strongly pro-choice stance on abortion.

Following the sudden death of John Smith in 1994, Skinner was among the MPs to pay tribute to him, saying that despite coming from a different wing of the Labour Party, he and Smith "never had words in anger", and said that he would have become Prime Minister and praised Smith for "dragging the Labour Party from the depths of despair to the pinnacles of power." Skinner concluded his tribute by saying that the best tribute to Smith would be to pass the Disabled Person's Act in his memory.

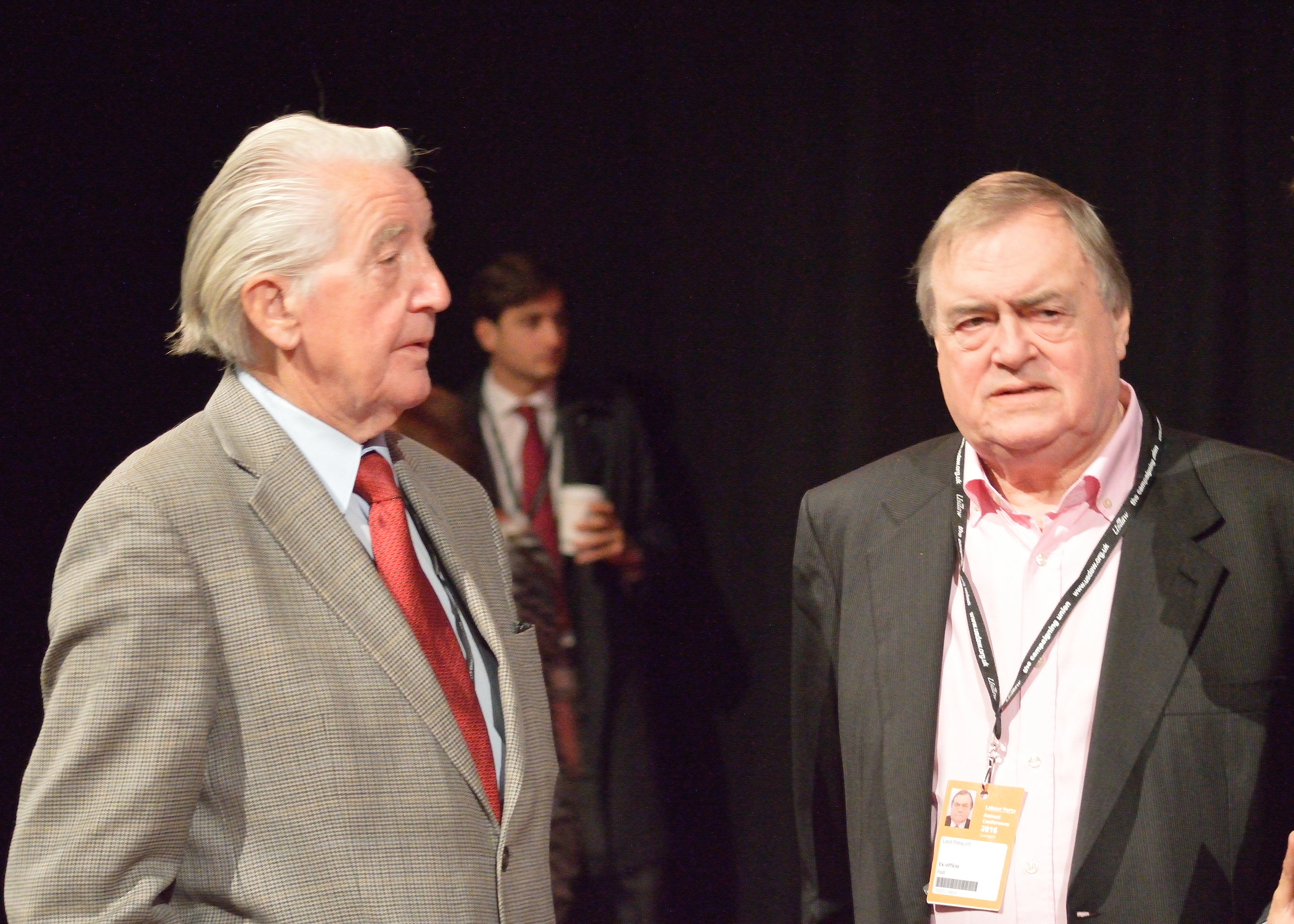
Skinner at the 2016 Labour Party Conference with John Prescott

In 2000, Skinner denounced former ally Ken Livingstone, then serving as a Labour MP. Livingstone had failed to win the party's nomination to be a candidate for Mayor of London, and had then decided to run as an independent candidate instead, urging his supporters to help Green Party candidates get elected. Skinner said that Livingstone had betrayed Labour Party activists in his Brent East constituency, whom he described as having fought for him "like tigers" when his majority had been small: "He tells them he's going to be the Labour candidate, then he lies to them. To me that's as low as you can get". He contrasted Livingstone with the official Labour candidate, fellow MP Frank Dobson, saying that Dobson was "a bloke and a half... not a prima donna ... not someone with an ego as big as a house". Skinner said Livingstone would "hit the headlines, but you'll never be able to trust him because he's broken his pledge and his loyalty to his party. The personality cult of the ego does not work down a coal mine and it does not work in the Labour Party".

Conversely, despite his renowned left-wing views, Skinner for a long time had a positive relationship with Prime Minister Tony Blair, a leading figure on the right wing of the party, stemming from advice that Skinner gave Blair regarding public speaking. As recently as 2018, he described the Blair and Gordon Brown ministries as a "golden period" for the NHS. However, Skinner strongly criticised Blair in 2019, after the former Prime Minister had advised pro-Remain Labour supporters who felt that the party's line on Brexit was too ambiguous to vote for explicitly pro-Remain parties in the 2019 European Parliament election; in the Morning Star, Skinner described Blair as a "destructive force" who was "try(ing) to destroy the Labour Party so people keep talking about his reign" and stating that he "went into Iraq and destroyed himself. He helped David Cameron and Theresa May into power. You're talking about a man who made a mess of it."

Skinner supported David Miliband in the 2010 Labour leadership election, which was won by his brother Ed Miliband. In March 2011, he was one of 15 MPs who voted against British participation in NATO's Libya intervention.

Skinner was one of 36 Labour MPs to nominate Jeremy Corbyn as a candidate in the Labour leadership election of 2015. Shortly after Corbyn was elected as leader, Skinner was elected to Labour's National Executive Committee, on which he remained until October 2016. Skinner supported Corbyn, alongside the majority of Labour MPs, in voting against the extension of RAF airstrikes against ISIS in Syria in December 2015.

Skinner has stated that he voted for the UK to leave the European Union in the 2016 referendum. He also joined repeatedly with other Leave-supporting Labour MPs, including Graham Stringer and Ronnie Campbell, to support Brexit and to defy his party's whip in a series of parliamentary votes during 2016-2019.

Skinner favours abolition of the House of Lords.

=== Suspensions ===
Skinner was suspended from Parliament on at least 10 occasions, usually for unparliamentary language when attacking opponents. Notable infractions included:

- In 1980, he attempted to raise points of order during question time, against parliamentary practice, (Note: In the UK Parliament, points of order are customarily only raised after question time and statements. In other countries with use the Westminster Parliamentary system, such as in Australia, points of order can be raised during question time.) which led to a prolonged altercation with Speaker of the House of Commons George Thomas.
- In 1981, accusing Speaker Thomas (a former Labour MP) of attending functions to raise funds for the governing Conservative Party.
- Twice in 1984, once for accusing Prime Minister Margaret Thatcher of "bribing judges" in relation to a court case the government had won relating to banning GCHQ employees from trade union membership; and the second time for calling SDP leader David Owen a "pompous sod" (and only agreeing to withdraw "pompous").
- In 1987, for accusing former cabinet minister Norman Tebbit of 'lining his pockets' and being 'dishonourable' as a result of his directorship and large shareholdings of British Telecom, a company he had privatised as Secretary of State for Trade and Industry, which Labour MPs perceived as a conflict of interest.
- In 1992, referring to the Minister of Agriculture John Gummer as "a little squirt of a Minister" and "a slimy wart on Margaret Thatcher's nose".
- In 1995, accusing the John Major government of a "crooked deal" to sell off Britain's coal mines.
- In 2005, when referring to the economic record of the Conservatives in the 1980s, making the remark, "The only thing that was growing then were the lines of coke in front of 'Boy George' and the rest of the Tories", a reference to allegations originally published in the Sunday Mirror of cocaine use by the newly appointed Shadow Chancellor of the Exchequer, George Osborne (though, in the Commons, Skinner referred to the News of the World).
- In 2006, accusing Deputy Speaker Alan Haselhurst of leniency towards remarks made by opposition frontbencher and future Prime Minister Theresa May "because she's a Tory".
- In 2016, for referring to Prime Minister David Cameron as "Dodgy Dave" (related to Skinner's contention of Cameron's dishonesty) in a parliamentary debate about the Panama Papers. House Speaker John Bercow asked Skinner to withdraw the word "dodgy". When Skinner refused, he was ordered to leave parliament for the remainder of that day's session. In July 2016, Skinner once again referred to Cameron as "Dodgy Dave" in parliament, though this time he was not reprimanded or asked to leave. "Dodgy Dave" has gained usage in the media, and on social media, when Cameron is being referred to disparagingly. Skinner's remarks resurfaced online after Cameron was appointed foreign secretary by Rishi Sunak in November 2023.

=== Queen's Speech quips ===
External videos
- Dennis Skinner- A collection of quips to Blackrod from 1989-2013-State Opening of Parliament — via YouTube

Known for his republican sentiments, Skinner regularly heckled during the annual Queen's Speech ceremony. He did this upon the arrival of Black Rod (the symbol of royal authority in the House of Lords) to summon MPs to hear the Queen's speech in the Lords' chamber. The best known, according to the New Statesman and other sources, are listed as follows:

Year	Quote	Notes
1987	"Tell her to sell up!"	A reference to the financial situation in the United Kingdom.
1988	"Ey up, here comes Puss in Boots!"	To Black Rod, Sir John Gingell.
1989	"Oh, it's a good outfit!"	To Black Rod, Sir John Gingell.
1990	"I bet he drinks Carling Black Label." "It tolls for thee, Maggie."	Spoken to Black Rod; reference to a popular advertising campaign at the time. Later he made a second comment which was a reference to the impending resignation of Margaret Thatcher as prime minister.
1992	"Tell her to pay her tax!"	In reference to the calls for the Queen to pay income tax.
1993	"Back to basics with Black Rod."	A reference to the Back to Basics campaign by the then Conservative government of John Major.
1995 and 1996	"New Labour, New Black Rod!"	A reference to Labour's election campaign slogan, "New Labour, New Britain" and to new Black Rod, Sir Edward Jones.
1997	"Do you want to borrow a Queen's Speech?"	Told to Black Rod.
2000	"Tell her to read The Guardian!"	The Guardian was campaigning at the time to abolish the monarchy.
2001	"You're nowt but a midget!"	Told to new Black Rod Sir Michael Willcocks to much laughter in the chamber.
2003	"Bar the doors." "Did she lock the door behind her?"	Skinner suggested that the Speaker, Michael Martin, "bar the doors" after Black Rod had arrived, a practice that is used to block late-arriving MPs from casting their votes after the division bells have been sounded. After the command he also said, "Did she lock the door behind her?" to laughter from other MPs. Martin scoffed at Skinner's tongue-in-cheek remark.
2004	"Aye, you've got a job to aspire to."	Spoken to Black Rod.
2005	"Has she brought Camilla with her?"	Of the Queen in reference to the recent wedding of Charles, Prince of Wales.
2006	"Have you got Helen Mirren on standby?"	Reference to Mirren's portrayal of Elizabeth II in the 2006 film, The Queen.
2007	"Who shot the harriers?"	Referring to a recent event in Sandringham, where two protected hen harriers had been shot near a royal property. Prince Harry and a friend had been questioned by police over the incident.
2008	"Any Tory moles at the Palace?"	Referring to the recent arrest of Conservative MP Damian Green in connection with an investigation about him receiving confidential information from a civil servant at the Home Office who was formerly a Conservative Party candidate; to which Black Rod quipped, "I shall miss you, Dennis", receiving laughter from other MPs. The 2008 State Opening of Parliament was Michael Willcocks's last as Black Rod.
2009	"Royal Expenses are on the way."	Reference to the parliamentary expenses scandal.
2010	"No royal commissions this week."	Reference to the recent newspaper story in the News of the World which revealed that Sarah, Duchess of York had taken cash payments for introducing businessmen to the Duke of York. Whether through error or purpose, he made his one-liner in the middle of the speech by Yeoman Usher Ted Lloyd-Jukes, who was filling in for an ill Black Rod. At the end, the Yeoman Usher replied, "Thank you, Dennis".
2012	"Jubilee Year, double-dip recession, what a start!"	Referring to the Queen's Jubilee year and claims that the United Kingdom had just entered a second recession. This quip was responded to by a mixture of laughter and shouts of "Shame" and "Absolute disgrace".
2013	"Royal Mail for sale. Queen's head privatised."	This was in reference to the coalition government's proposed privatisation of the Royal Mail, going against recently deceased Margaret Thatcher's promise that she was "not prepared to have the Queen's head privatised".
2014	"Coalition's last stand."	Referring to the last 11 months of the Conservative–Liberal Democrat coalition (and its final parliamentary session) before the election in May 2015.
2015	None	Skinner later revealed to the press that his preoccupation with preventing newly elected SNP members (whose numbers had swelled to fifty-six from six after the 2015 election) from taking his traditional seat on the opposition front bench prevented him from preparing a usual quip that year. He told The Daily Telegraph, "I was engaged in an activity today to ensure that the Scot Nats weren't going to take over that front bench. I was up at just after 6 o'clock and I had to do it yesterday."
2016	"Hands off the BBC!"	Referencing the government's white paper on the BBC.
2017	"Yeah, get your skates on, first race is half past two!"	Referencing the Queen's attendance at Royal Ascot later that day.
2019	"No, I'll not be going."	As custom, Skinner did not attend the Queen's Speech.

=== Elections ===
==== Elections in the 2010s ====
General election 2019: Bolsover
Party	Candidate	Votes	%	±%
Conservative	Mark Fletcher	21,791	47.4	+6.9
Labour	Dennis Skinner	16,492	35.9	−16.0
Brexit Party	Kevin Harper	4,151	9.0	New
Liberal Democrats	David Hancock	1,759	3.8	+0.9
Green	David Kesteven	758	1.7	New
Independent	Ross Walker	517	1.1	New
Independent	Natalie Hoy	470	1.0	New
Majority		5,299	11.5	N/A
Turnout		45,938	61.1	−2.2
Conservative gain from Labour		Swing	+11.5	

General election 2017: Bolsover
Party	Candidate	Votes	%	±%
Labour	Dennis Skinner	24,153	51.9	+0.7
Conservative	Helen Harrison	18,865	40.5	+16.0
UKIP	Philip Rose	2,129	4.6	−16.4
Liberal Democrats	Ross Shipman	1,372	2.9	−0.4
Majority		5,288	11.4	−15.3
Turnout		46,519	63.3	+2.2
Labour hold		Swing	−7.7	

General election 2015: Bolsover
Party	Candidate	Votes	%	±%
Labour	Dennis Skinner	22,542	51.2	+1.2
Conservative	Peter Bedford	10,764	24.5	−0.1
UKIP	Ray Calladine	9,228	21.0	+17.1
Liberal Democrats	David Lomax	1,464	3.3	−12.2
Majority		11,778	26.7	+1.3
Turnout		43,998	61.1	+0.6
Labour hold		Swing	+0.7	

General election 2010: Bolsover
Party	Candidate	Votes	%	±%
Labour	Dennis Skinner	21,995	50.0	
Conservative	Lee Rowley	10,812	24.6	
Liberal Democrats	Denise Hawksworth	6,821	15.5	
BNP	Martin Radford	2,640	6.0	New
UKIP	Ray Calladine	1,721	3.9	New
Majority		11,183	25.4	
Turnout		43,989	60.5	+3.2
Labour win (new boundaries)				

==== Elections in the 2000s ====
General election 2005: Bolsover
Party	Candidate	Votes	%	±%
Labour	Dennis Skinner	25,217	65.2	−3.4
Liberal Democrats	Denise Hawksworth	6,780	17.5	+5.6
Conservative	Hasan Imam	6,702	17.3	−2.2
Majority		18,437	47.7	−1.4
Turnout		38,699	57.3	+0.8
Labour hold		Swing	−4.5	

General election 2001: Bolsover
Party	Candidate	Votes	%	±%
Labour	Dennis Skinner	26,249	68.6	−5.4
Conservative	Simon Massey	7,472	19.5	+2.8
Liberal Democrats	Marie Bradley	4,550	11.9	+2.6
Majority		18,777	49.1	−7.8
Turnout		38,271	56.5	−14.8
Labour hold		Swing		

==== Elections in the 1990s ====
General election 1997: Bolsover
Party	Candidate	Votes	%	±%
Labour	Dennis Skinner	35,073	74.0	+9.5
Conservative	Richard Harwood	7,924	16.7	−8.6
Liberal Democrats	Ian Cox	4,417	9.3	−0.9
Majority		27,149	57.3	+18.1
Turnout		47,414	71.3	−7.8
Labour hold		Swing	+9.1	

General election 1992: Bolsover
Party	Candidate	Votes	%	±%
Labour	Dennis Skinner	33,978	64.5	+8.3
Conservative	Timothy D.R. James	13,323	25.3	−3.0
Liberal Democrats	Susan P. Barber	5,368	10.2	−5.3
Majority		20,655	39.2	+11.3
Turnout		52,669	79.1	+1.8
Labour hold		Swing	+5.7	

==== Elections in the 1980s ====
General election 1987: Bolsover
Party	Candidate	Votes	%	±%
Labour	Dennis Skinner	28,453	56.2	−0.1
Conservative	Michael Lingens	14,333	28.3	+1.4
SDP	Mark Fowler	7,836	15.5	−1.3
Majority		14,120	27.9	−1.5
Turnout		50,622	77.3	+4.6
Labour hold		Swing	-0.7	

General election 1983: Bolsover
Party	Candidate	Votes	%	±%
Labour	Dennis Skinner	26,514	56.3	
Conservative	S. Roberts	12,666	26.9	
SDP	S. Reddish	7,886	16.8	
Majority		13,848	29.4	
Turnout		47,066	72.7	−5.6
Labour win (new boundaries)				

==== Elections in the 1970s ====
General election 1979: Bolsover
Party	Candidate	Votes	%	±%
Labour	Dennis Skinner	27,495	66.58	
Conservative	Anthony Favell	10,116	24.49	
Liberal	James Ian Frost	3,688	8.93	
Majority		17,379	42.09	
Turnout		41,299	78.31	
Labour hold		Swing		

General election October 1974: Bolsover
Party	Candidate	Votes	%	±%
Labour	Dennis Skinner	27,275	70.55	
Conservative	C.L. Sternberg	6,209	16.06	
Liberal	M. Taylor	5,176	13.39	New
Majority		21,066	54.49	
Turnout		38,660	74.52	
Labour hold		Swing		

General election February 1974: Bolsover
Party	Candidate	Votes	%	±%
Labour	Dennis Skinner	30,787	76.47	−1.03
Conservative	A.R. Dix	9,474	23.53	+1.03
Majority		21,313	52.94	−2.06
Turnout		40,261	78.38	
Labour hold		Swing		

General election 1970: Bolsover
Party	Candidate	Votes	%	±%
Labour	Dennis Skinner	28,830	77.50	
Conservative	Ivor J Humphrey	8,371	22.50	
Majority		20,459	55.00	
Turnout		37,201	70.76	
Labour hold		Swing		

== After parliament (2019–present) ==
During the 2020 Labour deputy leadership election, which was won by Angela Rayner, Skinner endorsed Richard Burgon for Deputy Leader of the Labour Party, saying "I'm backing Richard to be Deputy Leader of the Labour Party. Richard is a socialist who never gives in and never gives up. He gives me hope for the future of our Party. I urge CLPs & unions to nominate Richard and members to vote for him."

On 6 May 2020, Skinner was named honorary president of the Socialist Campaign Group.

== Popular culture ==
=== Nature of the Beast documentary ===
A documentary about Skinner sanctioned by him, Nature of the Beast, was completed in 2017 by production company Shut Out The Light. The documentary traces Skinner's rise to political icon status and covers his working-class upbringing, his family influences and his hobbies away from "The Palace of Varieties". Skinner's four surviving brothers and several of his Bolsover constituents are interviewed in the documentary.

=== Stage play ===
Derby Theatre commissioned Kevin Fegan to write a play inspired by Skinner, titled The Palace of Varieties – life and times of Dennis Skinner, which was performed at the theatre in early 2022.

=== "Tony Skinner's Lad" ===
In September 2020, Robb Johnson's song about Skinner, "Tony Skinner's Lad", topped the Amazon download chart.

"I'm Scum"

Dennis Skinner was mentioned in IDLES's song "I'm Scum" from their album "Joy as an Act of Resistance" released in 2018.

== Personal life ==
In 1960, Skinner married Mary Parker, from whom he separated in 1989. He has three children and four grandchildren. Since the 1990s, his partner has been former researcher Lois Blasenheim.

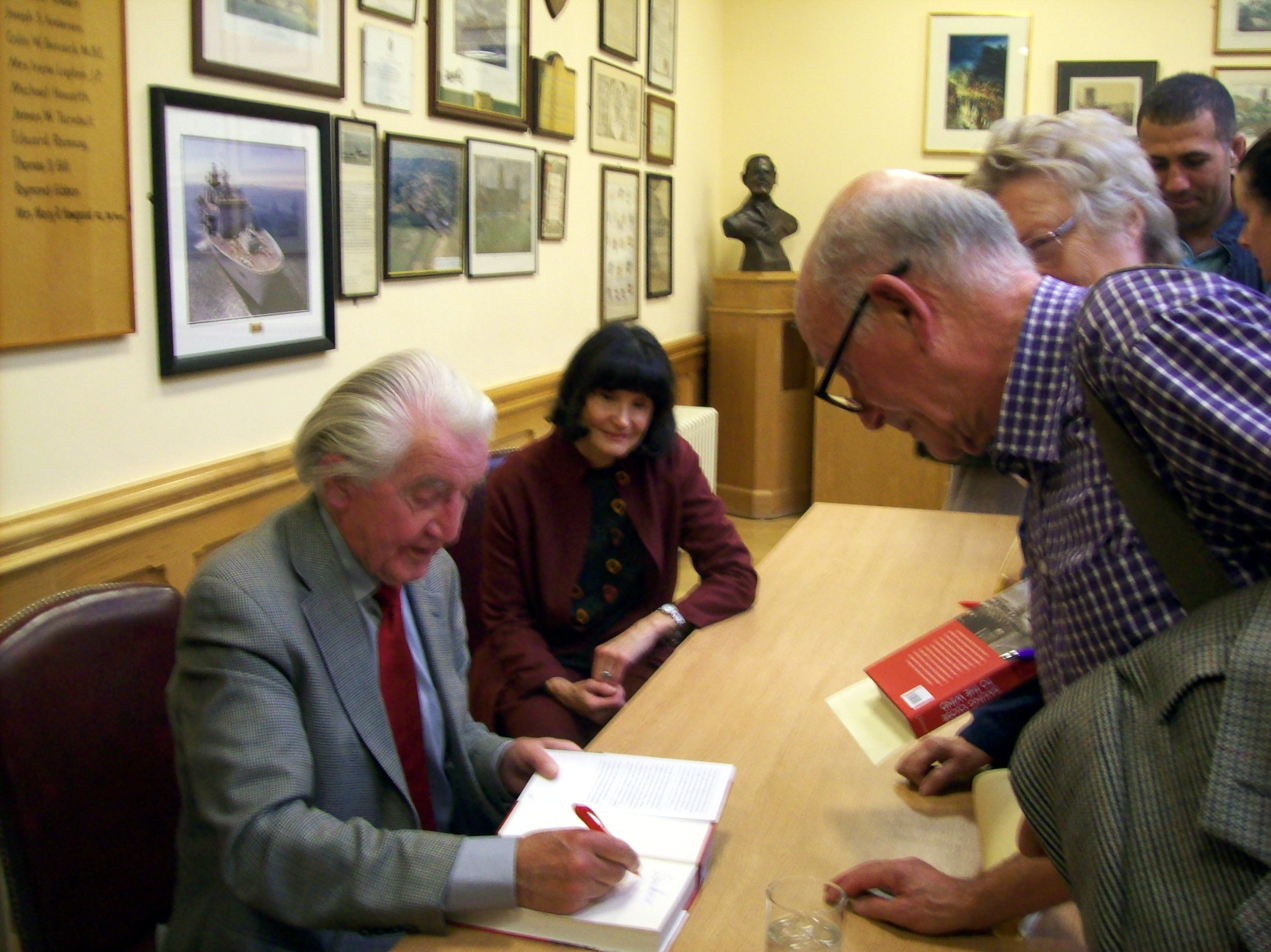
Skinner signing a copy of his book in October 2014

In 2014, Skinner released his autobiography Sailing Close to the Wind: Reminiscences. In an interview he gave later in the year, Skinner stated that he had never sent an email and did not have a Twitter account, and when asked what he considered Cameron's biggest achievement to be, Skinner said "I can't trust him as far as I can throw him."

In 1999, Skinner was diagnosed with advanced bladder cancer and subsequently had surgery to remove a malignant tumour. In 2003, he underwent a double heart bypass operation. He underwent hip surgery in 2019. He was too ill to campaign in the 2019 general election after he was hospitalised with a dangerous infection following the hip operation. He was not present at the count when he lost his seat.

Skinner's mother was diagnosed with Alzheimer's disease prior to her death in the 1980s. Skinner sang to his late mother when she was diagnosed with the disease and was inspired by her ability to recall old songs. Since 2008, he has visited care homes in Derbyshire to sing to elderly patients with dementia.

Skinner is a supporter of Derby County Football Club and Derbyshire County Cricket Club.

== Notes ==
Parliament of the United Kingdom
Preceded by Harold Neal	Member of Parliament for Bolsover; 1970–2019	Succeeded by Mark Fletcher
Party political offices
Preceded by Neil Kinnock	Chairman of the Labour Party; 1988–1989	Succeeded by Jo Richardson
Honorary titles
Preceded by Gerald Kaufman	Oldest sitting Member of Parliament; 2017–2019	Succeeded by Bill Cash
Trade union offices
Preceded by Herbert Parkin	President of the Derbyshire Area of the National Union of Mineworkers; 1966–1970	Succeeded by Raymond Ellis
