= 1942 Llandaff and Barry by-election =

UK Parliamentary by-election

The 1942 Llandaff and Barry by-election was held on 10 June 1942. The by-election was held due to the death of the incumbent Conservative MP, Patrick Munro. It was won by the Conservative candidate Cyril Lakin.

1942 Llandaff and Barry by-election
Party	Candidate	Votes	%	±%
Conservative	Cyril Lakin	19,408	56.9	+5.7
Ind. Socialist	Kim Mackay	13,753	40.3	N/A
Independent Welsh Nationalist	Rolle Malcolm Ritson Paton	975	2.9	N/A
Majority		5,655	16.6	+14.1
Turnout		34,136	41.5	−35.5
Registered electors		82,232		
Conservative hold		Swing		
