= Mark Fletcher (politician) =

British politician (born 1985)

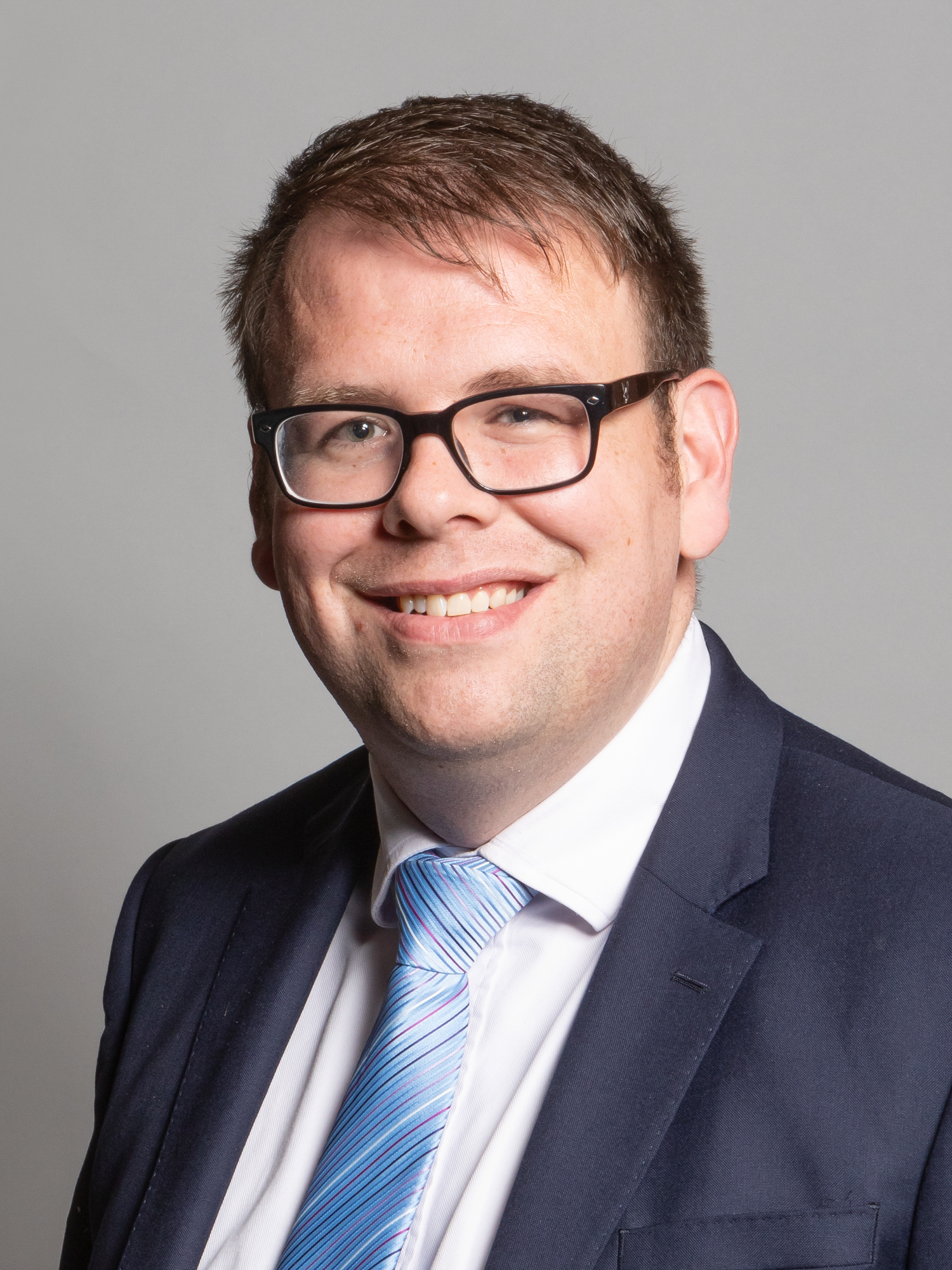
- Official portrait, 2020

Assistant Government Whip
- In office 14 November 2023 – 5 July 2024
- Prime Minister: Rishi Sunak

Member of Parliament for Bolsover
- In office 12 December 2019 – 30 May 2024
- Preceded by: Dennis Skinner
- Succeeded by: Natalie Fleet

Personal details
- Born: Mark Peter Fletcher; 29 September 1985 (age 40) Barnsley, South Yorkshire, England
- Party: Conservative
- Spouse: Will Knock (m. 2016; sep. 2024)
- Education: Jesus College, Cambridge (BA)
- Website: mark-fletcher.org.uk

Mark Peter Fletcher (born 29 September 1985) is a British politician who was the member of Parliament (MP) for Bolsover from 2019 to 2024. He is a member of the Conservative Party.

== Early life ==
Fletcher grew up in Doncaster, South Yorkshire, attending Ridgewood School. The first in his family to go to university, he studied land economy at Jesus College, Cambridge, and was president of the Cambridge University Students' Union.

== Career ==
Fletcher worked in the House of Lords as the chief of staff to the prime minister's trade envoy to Uganda and Rwanda, Dolar Popat, as well as for the private healthcare company Synergix Health, founded by entrepreneur David Ravechio and Byju Thickar.

At the 2015 general election he stood in the Doncaster North constituency against Labour Party Leader Ed Miliband. Two years later, Fletcher was the Tory candidate in Stockton North, where he achieved an 8.5% increase in the Conservative vote share but lost nonetheless to Labour's Alex Cunningham.

Fletcher also contested the local government elections in May 2018 at Tower Hamlets London Borough Council, coming second out of three Conservative candidates in the diverse three-member ward of Whitechapel. He gained 274 votes.

Fletcher was chosen as the candidate for Bolsover in the 2019 general election. He defeated incumbent Labour politician Dennis Skinner, who had held the seat since the 1970 general election. After Harold Neal and Skinner, Fletcher was only the third person to serve as MP for Bolsover since it was first contested in 1950. Fletcher was also one of two former Tower Hamlets 2018 Conservative council candidates to win a marginal seat in the 2019 parliamentary election, the other being Gedling's Tom Randall, who had stood in Canary Wharf ward.

Fletcher was involved in efforts to reopen a disused railway line in Ashfield District, a campaign to restore post-16 education to Bolsover, and an endeavour to make major improvements to Junction 28 of the M1.

Fletcher resigned from his position as parliamentary private secretary (PPS) to the Department for Business, Energy and Industrial Strategy following the Chris Pincher scandal, stating in his resignation letter that he was the MP who reported Pincher to the chief whip, Chris Heaton-Harris. On 26 September 2022, Fletcher was appointed PPS to Kwasi Kwarteng, the new Chancellor of the Exchequer under Prime Minister Liz Truss. In 2023 he became PPS to Jeremy Hunt, the Chancellor to Prime Minister Rishi Sunak. In November 2023, he joined the front benches when he was appointed an Assistant Government Whip.

At the 2024 general election, Fletcher lost his seat to Labour candidate Natalie Fleet.

== Political views ==
Fletcher is a supporter of Brexit, voting to leave the European Union in the 2016 referendum.

Fletcher has been critical of the BBC, saying its employees and coverage "look down on working class communities in the North and Midlands. The coverage of Brexit was borderline farcical, wall-to-wall coverage of anti-British stories and negativity".

== Post-parliamentary career ==
Following his defeat at the 2024 general election, Fletcher was appointed as Director of External Affairs at Feedback Medical.

== Personal life ==
Fletcher is openly gay. He is married to Will Knock. On 19 February 2024, Knock said that they had been separated for six weeks.

Parliament of the United Kingdom
Preceded by Dennis Skinner	Member of Parliament for Bolsover; 2019–2024	Succeeded by Natalie Fleet
