= Leicester North East =

Parliamentary constituency in the United Kingdom, 1950–1974

- Former borough constituency for the House of Commons

1950–February 1974
- Seats: one
- Created from: Leicester East and Leicester South
- Replaced by: Leicester East

Leicester North East was a borough constituency in the city of Leicester. It returned one Member of Parliament (MP) to the House of Commons of the Parliament of the United Kingdom.

The constituency was created for the 1950 general election, and abolished for the February 1974 general election.

== Boundaries ==
The County Borough of Leicester wards of Belgrave, Charnwood, Humberstone, and Latimer.

== Members of Parliament ==
Election	Member	Party	Notes
1950	Terence Donovan	Labour	Resigned 1950 on appointment as a High Court Judge
1950 by-election	Sir Lynn Ungoed-Thomas	Labour	Resigned 1962 on appointment as a High Court Judge
1962 by-election	Tom Bradley	Labour	
Feb 1974	constituency abolished		

== Election results ==
=== Elections in the 1950s ===
General election 1950: Leicester North East
Party	Candidate	Votes	%	±%
Labour	Terence Donovan	25,305	56.49	
Conservative	H A Taylor	14,908	33.28	
Liberal	Michael J Moroney	4,257	9.50	
Communist	Frederick Charles Westacott	327	0.73	
Majority		10,379	23.21	
Turnout		44,797	85.85	
Labour win (new seat)				

Michael J Moroney was an industrial statistician and the author of the best-selling book on statistics Facts from Figures

1950 Leicester North East by-election
Party	Candidate	Votes	%	±%
Labour	Lynn Ungoed-Thomas	18,777	57.92	+1.43
Conservative	H A Taylor	13,642	42.08	+8.80
Majority		5,135	15.84	−7.37
Turnout		32,419		
Labour hold		Swing	+3.68	

General election 1951: Leicester North East
Party	Candidate	Votes	%	±%
Labour	Lynn Ungoed-Thomas	26,209	59.99	+2.07
Conservative	William Browne	17,478	40.01	+6.93
Majority		8,731	19.98	−3.23
Turnout		43,687	84.39	−1.51
Labour hold		Swing	−2.43	

General election 1955: Leicester North East
Party	Candidate	Votes	%	±%
Labour	Lynn Ungoed-Thomas	22,264	56.57	−4.65
Conservative	Thelma Street	17,094	43.43	+3.42
Majority		5,170	13.14	−6.84
Turnout		39,358	78.53	−5.86
Labour hold		Swing	−4.03	

General election 1959: Leicester North East
Party	Candidate	Votes	%	±%
Labour	Lynn Ungoed-Thomas	19,421	51.91	−4.65
Conservative	Ann Spokes	17,990	48.09	+4.56
Majority		1,431	3.82	−9.32
Turnout		37,411	78.38	−0.15
Labour hold		Swing	+4.60	

=== Elections in the 1960s ===
1962 Leicester North East by-election
Party	Candidate	Votes	%	±%
Labour	Tom Bradley	11,274	41.48	−10.43
Liberal	David Bond	9,326	34.31	New
Conservative	Robin Marlar	6,578	24.20	−23.89
Majority		1,948	7.17	+3.34
Turnout		27,178		
Labour hold		Swing	+22.37	

General election 1964: Leicester North East
Party	Candidate	Votes	%	±%
Labour	Tom Bradley	15,494	46.39	−4.91
Conservative	Robert DG Williams	12,195	36.51	+12.31
Liberal	F Ivor Glenton	5,712	17.10	−17.21
Majority		3,299	9.88	+2.81
Turnout		33,401	77.48	−0.90
Labour hold		Swing	+8.61	

General election 1966: Leicester North East
Party	Candidate	Votes	%	±%
Labour	Tom Bradley	17,007	54.03	+7.64
Conservative	Robert DG Williams	10,769	34.21	−2.30
Liberal	F Ivor Glenton	3,703	11.76	−5.34
Majority		6,238	19.82	−9.94
Turnout		31,479	75.36	−2.12
Labour hold		Swing	+4.97	

=== Elections in the 1970s ===
General election 1970: Leicester North East
Party	Candidate	Votes	%	±%
Labour	Tom Bradley	15,016	48.82	−5.21
Conservative	Peter Edward Findlay Heneage	14,125	45.92	+12.71
Anti Immigration	Dennis J Taylor	1,616	5.25	New
Majority		891	2.90	−16.92
Turnout		30,757	70.97	−4.39
Labour hold		Swing	+8.98	
