= Cheney v Conn =

Cheney v Conn (Inspector of Taxes)
- Court: High Court (Chancery Division)
- Full case name: Howard William Cheney v Conn (Inspector of Taxes)
- Decided: 3 July 1967
- Citations: [1968] 1 WLR 242 [1968] 1 AII ER 779

Court membership
- Judge sitting: Ungoed-Thomas J

Keywords
- Parliamentary supremacy

Cheney v Conn (Inspector of Taxes) [1968] 1 WLR 242, [1968] 1 All ER 779, also known as Cheney v Inland Revenue Commissioners, was a decision of the English High Court in which the Court ruled that statutes made by Parliament could not be declared invalid on the basis of illegality, restating the principle that Parliament is supreme.

== Facts ==
Howard William Cheney, a taxpayer, had appealed to the Special Commissioners against an assessment to income tax for 1964-65, made against him under the Finance Act 1964 (and an equivalent assessment to surtax for 1963-64). A substantial part of the income tax collected was used by the UK government to fund the construction of nuclear weapons, which were banned by the Geneva Convention. Cheney argued that the use of income tax and surtax for an illegal purpose had the effect of invalidating the tax assessments made against him.

The Special Commissioners ruled that the purpose towards which the taxes collected were to be put was not relevant to the validity of the tax assessments, and that the assessments were therefore valid. Cheney appealed, but the decision was upheld by the High Court.

== Judgment ==
Ungoed-Thomas J dismissed the appeal, holding:

If the purpose for which a statute may be used is an invalid purpose, then such remedy as there may be must be directed to dealing with that purpose and not to invalidating the statute itself. What the statute itself enacts cannot be unlawful, because what the statute says and provides is itself the law, and the highest form of law that is known to this country. It is the law which prevails over every other form of law, and it is not for the court to say that a parliamentary enactment, the highest law in this country, is illegal.
