= 1950 Leicester North East by-election =

UK Parliamentary by-election

The 1950 Leicester North East by-election was held on 28 September 1950 when the incumbent Labour MP, Terence Donovan was appointed as a High Court Judge. It was retained by the Labour candidate Lynn Ungoed-Thomas.

Leicester North East by-election, 1950
Party	Candidate	Votes	%	±%
Labour	Lynn Ungoed-Thomas	18,777	57.92	+1.43
Conservative	H A Taylor	13,642	42.08	+8.80
Majority		5,135	15.84	−7.37
Turnout		32,419		
Labour hold		Swing	+3.68	
