= Robin Marlar =

English cricketer (1931–2022)

Personal information
- Full name: Robin Geoffrey Marlar
- Born: 2 January 1931; Eastbourne, Sussex, England
- Died: 30 September 2022 (aged 91); Epsom, Surrey, England
- Batting: Right-handed
- Bowling: Right-arm off-spin

Domestic team information
- Years: Team
- 1951–1953: Cambridge University
- 1951–1968: Sussex

Career statistics
Competition	First-class
Matches	289
Runs scored	3,033
Batting average	9.72
100s/50s	0/2
Top score	64
Balls bowled	54,450
Wickets	970
Bowling average	25.22
5 wickets in innings	66
10 wickets in match	15
Best bowling	9/46
Catches/stumpings	137/–
- Source: CricketArchive, 6 February 2014

Robin Geoffrey Marlar (2 January 1931 – 30 September 2022) was an English cricketer and cricket journalist. He played for Cambridge University before playing for Sussex County Cricket Club from 1951 to 1968. He captained both teams.

== Early life ==
Marlar was born in Eastbourne, East Sussex on 2 January 1931. He was educated at King Edward VI School, Lichfield and Harrow School, before studying at Magdalene College, Cambridge. He played first-class cricket for Cambridge University, winning a blue in 1951, 1952 and 1953 (when he captained Cambridge to victory over Oxford).

== Career ==
Marlar debuted for Sussex in July 1951 in a match against Kent held at the Central Recreation Ground in Hastings. He played with the club until 1968 and served as its captain between 1955 and 1959. An innovative off-break bowler, he took 970 wickets in 289 matches at an average of 25.22, with a personal best of 9/46 against Lancashire at Hove in 1955. He was described as "shrewd and skilful" by Wisden Cricketers' Almanack.

== Outside cricket and later life ==
Marlar stood as a Conservative candidate for Bolsover in the 1959 General Election, and in a 1962 by-election at Leicester North East. Decades later, he was an early Referendum Party candidate at the 1993 Newbury by-election.

After retiring from professional cricket, Marlar had a successful journalistic career as an outspoken cricket correspondent of The Sunday Times, and wrote the illustrated history The Story of Cricket (1979). He also wrote Decision Against England: The Centenary Ashes 1982-3 (1983). One noted example of his bluntness came in December 1987, when he described the conduct of umpires officiating at a five-day international match against Pakistan as "intolerable, because whether or not the umpires were cheating, that is the way it appeared", adding that it was the worst crisis since 1932.

Marlar also started a thriving headhunting business based in Sloane Square and became a cricket administrator. He served as chairman of Sussex in 1996 and 1997, laying the foundations for the club's first Championship win in 2003. He was appointed president of Sussex County Cricket Club for 2005 and President of MCC for 2005–06. During this time he incurred some controversy when, on a declaration to the Sunday Telegraph, he described it as "absolutely outrageous" that female athletes play cricket with male athletes, in response to Holly Colvin and Sarah Taylor, who had both played for England, being chosen to play for Brighton College's First XI that summer.

== Personal life ==
Marlar had six children who survived him. He died on 30 September 2022 at Epsom Hospital. He was 91 years old.

Sporting positions
Preceded by Hubert Doggart	Sussex county cricket captain 1955–1959	Succeeded by Ted Dexter
