= Cyril Lakin =

British politician (1893–1948)

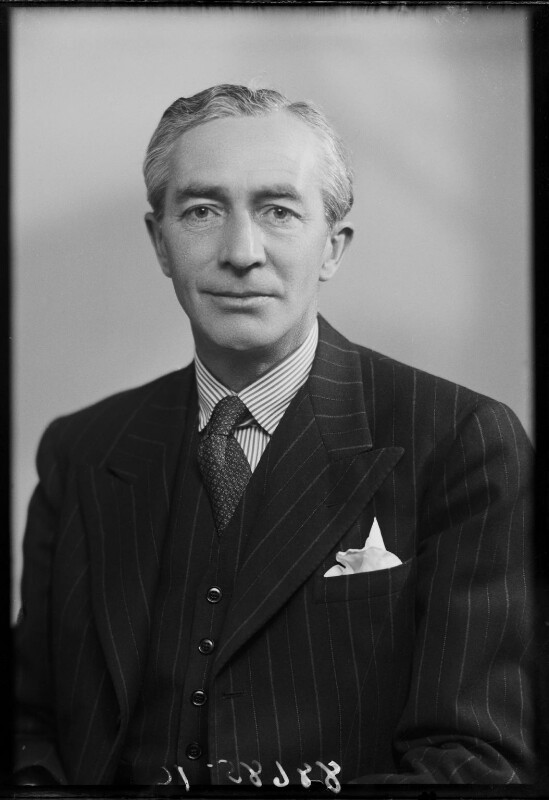
Lakin in 1942

Cyril Harry Alfred Lakin (29 December 1893 – 23 June 1948) was a Welsh politician and farmer who was the Conservative Party Member of Parliament (MP) for Llandaff and Barry in South Wales. He won the seat at a by-election in June 1942, with a 5,655 majority over an independent Labour candidate, but was defeated at the 1945 general election by the official Labour Party candidate Lynn Ungoed-Thomas.

Lakin lived in London, his family lived at Highlight Farm in Barry, Vale of Glamorgan. His wife was Vera Marjory Savill, whom he married in 1926 and had one daughter Bridget, who was born in 1927. He died in France and his wife died on the Isle of Wight in 1990.

== Sources ==
- Geoff Andrews, Smooth operator: the life and times of Cyril Lakin, editor, broadcaster and politician (Parthian, Cadigan, 2022; ISBN 978-1-913640-18-7).
- www.barrywales.co.uk

Parliament of the United Kingdom
Preceded by Patrick Munro	Member of Parliament for Llandaff and Barry; 1942–1945	Succeeded by Lynn Ungoed-Thomas
