= Tom Bradley (British politician) =

British politician (1926–2002)

Thomas George Bradley (13 April 1926 – 9 September 2002) was a British politician for Labour and the SDP.

Kettering-born, Tom Bradley was educated at Kettering Central School and worked in the mines during World War II. Bradley joined the London, Midland and Scottish Railway as a junior clerk in the Goods Depot at Kettering in 1941. He became a railway clerk at Oundle and was national treasurer of the clerks' union, the Transport Salaried Staffs' Association from 1961, its president from 1964 to 1977, and was its acting General Secretary for four months in 1977 after the retirement of the previous General Secretary (David MacKenzie) on health grounds. He served as a councillor on Northamptonshire County Council from 1952 and as an alderman from 1961.

Bradley contested Rutland and Stamford as a Labour candidate in 1950, 1951 and 1955, and Preston South in 1959. He was elected Member of Parliament (MP) for Leicester North East at a 1962 by-election, representing Leicester East from 1974. He served as parliamentary private secretary to the Home Secretary from 1966.

On 20 February 1981 Bradley announced he would not seek to contest his seat again as a Labour Candidate. He claimed that the Party's National Executive Committee and the Party Conference were "knocking the living daylights out of decent, well established party practices" and said he would be morally compelled to join any new party formed by the Council for Social Democracy which had been created by the Gang of Four the previous month. The same day three other supporters of the Council for Social Democracy resigned the Labour whip. Unsurprisingly Bradley was among the Labour MPs who defected to the new Social Democratic Party which emerged from the Council for Social Democracy in March 1981.

In 1983, he stood for re-election in Leicester East but came third with 21% of the vote. This however may have helped the Conservative candidate Peter Bruinvels beat the future Labour minister Patricia Hewitt by 933 votes. He died in Kettering in September 2002, at the age of 76.

Parliament of the United Kingdom
Preceded by Sir Lynn Ungoed-Thomas	Member of Parliament for Leicester North East; 1962–February 1974	Constituency abolished
New constituency	Member of Parliament for Leicester East; February 1974–1983	Succeeded by Peter Bruinvels
Party political offices
Preceded by Fred Mulley	Chair of the Labour Party; 1977–1978	Succeeded by John Chalmers
Trade union offices
Preceded by Ray Gunter	President of the Transport Salaried Staffs' Association; 1965 – 1977	Succeeded by Walter Johnson
