= Bolsover (constituency) =

Parliamentary constituency in the United Kingdom, 1950 onwards

Coordinates: 53.23°N 1.30°W

- County constituency for the House of Commons
- Interactive map of boundaries since 2024
- Location within the East Midlands
- County: Derbyshire
- Population: 94,473 (2011 census)
- Electorate: 74,680 (March 2020)
- Major settlements: Bolsover, Shirebrook, Clowne, South Normanton

Current constituency
- Created: 1950
- Member of Parliament: Natalie Fleet (Labour)
- Seats: One
- Created from: Clay Cross and North East Derbyshire

Bolsover (/ˈbɒlsˌoʊvər/, /ˈbɒlzˌoʊvər/ and commonly /boʊzər/) is a constituency in Derbyshire, represented in the House of Commons of the UK Parliament since 2024 by Natalie Fleet, a member of the Labour Party. The constituency was created in 1950, and is centred on the town of Bolsover.

== History ==
Before the Reform Act 1832, relatively wealthy people (forty-shilling freeholders) of the whole county could attend elections when there was an opposition candidate. From 1868 until 1885 the area formed part of the East Derbyshire constituency, redrawn out of the North Derbyshire constituency formed in 1832. The Bolsover constituency was created in 1950 from parts of the constituencies of North East Derbyshire, formed in 1885, and Clay Cross, formed in 1918.

Between 1970 and 2019, the constituency was represented by Labour's Dennis Skinner, who by 2019 was the oldest member of the House of Commons and the second longest-serving. At the constituency's inception it was one of the safest Labour seats in the country, but over the following half century Skinner's vote share dropped from 77% in 1970, still holding a high vote share of 65% in 2005, to only 36% in 2019, with the result that he lost the seat to the Conservatives by a margin of 11%. The seat was regained by Labour in 2024, in part due to the two right-wing parties, Reform UK and the Conservative Party splitting the vote. Labour's share of the vote was still well below what they had been getting before Brexit.

== Boundaries ==
Boundaries of Bolsover from 1983 to 2010

1950–1983: The Urban District of Bolsover, and the Rural Districts of Blackwell and Clowne.

1983–2010: The District of Bolsover, and the District of North East Derbyshire wards of Morton, Pilsley, Shirland, and Sutton.

2010–present: The District of Bolsover, and the District of North East Derbyshire wards of Holmewood and Heath, Pilsley and Morton, Shirland, and Sutton.

Subject to a minor adjustment due to ward boundary changes in the District of North East Derbyshire, the 2023 review of Westminster constituencies, which was based on the ward structure in place at 1 December 2020, left the boundaries unchanged.

== Constituency profile ==
The seat includes many former mining communities. Before 2019 it was a Labour Party stronghold, although the then MP Dennis Skinner's share of the popular vote dropped to 50% in the 2010 election from a high of 77.5% (see below), amongst social and boundary changes. Its economy faced struggles after the last closures in the early 1990s of the coal pits upon which the area thrived for many years. Bolsover's tourism industry has emerged in recent years, including accommodation and tours involving Bolsover Castle, owned by English Heritage, and Hardwick Hall, home of Bess of Hardwick.

Skinner, who held the seat from 1970 until 2019, was between 2017 and 2019 the second longest serving MP in the Commons after Kenneth Clarke. In the 2010 reforms to the constituency, Labour won 50% of the votes cast. At the 2017 general election, Skinner's majority was cut to little more than 5,000, the first time the Labour majority in the seat had ever been lower than 10,000. He lost his bid to be re-elected in 2019 losing to Conservative candidate Mark Fletcher. Skinner had been ill during the election campaign and was not present at the count when he lost his seat.

The majority of voters in the area voted in favour of Brexit during the 2016 referendum; this was the preferred outcome of the then local MP Dennis Skinner. This considerable turn out in favour of Brexit resulted in Reform UK to include it in its priority list of constituencies for the 2024 General Election.

== Members of Parliament ==
Election	Member	Party
1950	Harold Neal	Labour
1970	Dennis Skinner	Labour
2019	Mark Fletcher	Conservative
2024	Natalie Fleet	Labour

== Elections ==
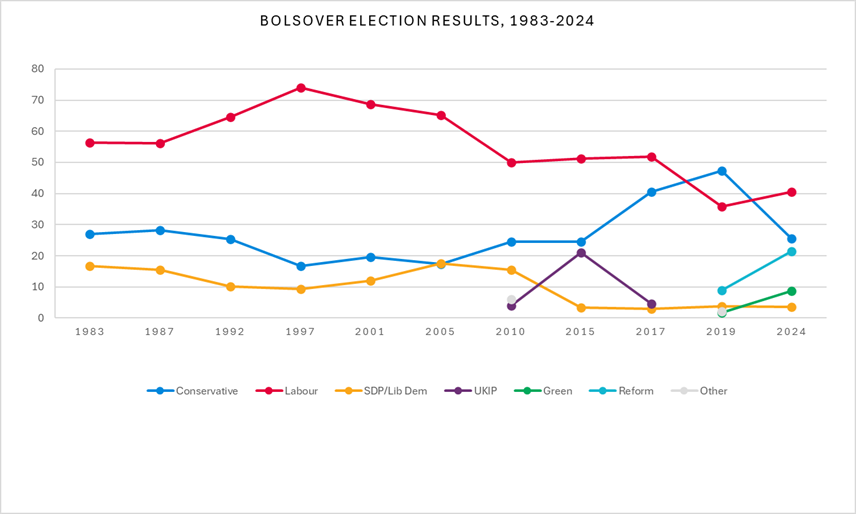
Bolsover election results 1983-2024

=== Elections in the 2020s ===
General election 2024: Bolsover
Party	Candidate	Votes	%	±%
Labour	Natalie Fleet	17,197	40.5	+4.3
Conservative	Mark Fletcher	10,874	25.5	–22.1
Reform	Robert Reaney	9,131	21.5	+12.9
Green	David Kesteven	3,754	8.8	+7.2
Liberal Democrats	David Hancock	1,478	3.5	–0.3
Majority		6,323	14.9	N/A
Turnout		42,434	54.9	−6.2
Registered electors		77,334		
Labour gain from Conservative		Swing	+13.2	

=== Elections in the 2010s ===
2019 notional result
Party	Vote	%
Conservative	21,792	47.7
Labour	16,519	36.2
Brexit Party	3,920	8.6
Liberal Democrats	1,741	3.8
Green Party	717	1.6
Independent politician	517	1.1
Independent politician	470	1
Majority	5,273	11.5
Turnout	45,676	61.2
Electorate	74,680	

General election 2019: Bolsover
Party	Candidate	Votes	%	±%
Conservative	Mark Fletcher	21,791	47.4	+6.9
Labour	Dennis Skinner	16,492	35.9	−16.0
Brexit Party	Kevin Harper	4,151	9.0	New
Liberal Democrats	David Hancock	1,759	3.8	+0.9
Green	David Kesteven	758	1.7	New
Independent	Ross Walker	517	1.1	New
Independent	Natalie Hoy	470	1.0	New
Majority		5,299	11.5	N/A
Turnout		45,938	61.1	−2.2
Conservative gain from Labour		Swing	+11.5	

General election 2017: Bolsover
Party	Candidate	Votes	%	±%
Labour	Dennis Skinner	24,153	51.9	+0.7
Conservative	Helen Harrison	18,865	40.5	+16.0
UKIP	Philip Rose	2,129	4.6	−16.4
Liberal Democrats	Ross Shipman	1,372	2.9	−0.4
Majority		5,288	11.4	−15.3
Turnout		46,519	63.3	+2.2
Labour hold		Swing	−7.7	

General election 2015: Bolsover
Party	Candidate	Votes	%	±%
Labour	Dennis Skinner	22,542	51.2	+1.2
Conservative	Peter Bedford	10,764	24.5	−0.1
UKIP	Ray Calladine	9,228	21.0	+17.1
Liberal Democrats	David Lomax	1,464	3.3	−12.2
Majority		11,778	26.7	+1.3
Turnout		43,998	61.1	+0.6
Labour hold		Swing	+0.7	

General election 2010: Bolsover
Party	Candidate	Votes	%	±%
Labour	Dennis Skinner	21,995	50.0	
Conservative	Lee Rowley	10,812	24.6	
Liberal Democrats	Denise Hawksworth	6,821	15.5	
BNP	Martin Radford	2,640	6.0	New
UKIP	Ray Calladine	1,721	3.9	New
Majority		11,183	25.4	
Turnout		43,989	60.5	+3.2
Labour win (new boundaries)				

=== Elections in the 2000s ===
General election 2005: Bolsover
Party	Candidate	Votes	%	±%
Labour	Dennis Skinner	25,217	65.2	−3.4
Liberal Democrats	Denise Hawksworth	6,780	17.5	+5.6
Conservative	Hasan Imam	6,702	17.3	−2.2
Majority		18,437	47.7	−1.4
Turnout		38,699	57.3	+0.8
Labour hold		Swing	−4.5	

General election 2001: Bolsover
Party	Candidate	Votes	%	±%
Labour	Dennis Skinner	26,249	68.6	−5.4
Conservative	Simon Massey	7,472	19.5	+2.8
Liberal Democrats	Marie Bradley	4,550	11.9	+2.6
Majority		18,777	49.1	−7.8
Turnout		38,271	56.5	−14.8
Labour hold		Swing		

=== Elections in the 1990s ===
General election 1997: Bolsover
Party	Candidate	Votes	%	±%
Labour	Dennis Skinner	35,073	74.0	+9.5
Conservative	Richard Harwood	7,924	16.7	−8.6
Liberal Democrats	Ian Cox	4,417	9.3	−0.9
Majority		27,149	57.3	+18.1
Turnout		47,414	71.3	−7.8
Labour hold		Swing	+9.1	

General election 1992: Bolsover
Party	Candidate	Votes	%	±%
Labour	Dennis Skinner	33,978	64.5	+8.3
Conservative	Timothy D.R. James	13,323	25.3	−3.0
Liberal Democrats	Susan P. Barber	5,368	10.2	−5.3
Majority		20,655	39.2	+11.3
Turnout		52,669	79.1	+1.8
Labour hold		Swing	+5.7	

=== Elections in the 1980s ===
General election 1987: Bolsover
Party	Candidate	Votes	%	±%
Labour	Dennis Skinner	28,453	56.2	−0.1
Conservative	Michael Lingens	14,333	28.3	+1.4
SDP	Mark Fowler	7,836	15.5	−1.3
Majority		14,120	27.9	−1.5
Turnout		50,622	77.3	+4.6
Labour hold		Swing	-0.7	

General election 1983: Bolsover
Party	Candidate	Votes	%	±%
Labour	Dennis Skinner	26,514	56.3	
Conservative	Samuel Roberts	12,666	26.9	
SDP	Stuart Reddish	7,886	16.8	
Majority		13,848	29.4	
Turnout		47,066	72.7	−5.6
Labour win (new boundaries)				

=== Elections in the 1970s ===
General election 1979: Bolsover
Party	Candidate	Votes	%	±%
Labour	Dennis Skinner	27,495	66.6	
Conservative	Anthony Favell	10,116	24.5	
Liberal	James Ian Frost	3,688	8.9	
Majority		17,379	42.09	
Turnout		41,299	78.31	
Labour hold		Swing		

General election October 1974: Bolsover
Party	Candidate	Votes	%	±%
Labour	Dennis Skinner	27,275	70.6	
Conservative	C.L. Sternberg	6,209	16.1	
Liberal	M. Taylor	5,176	13.4	New
Majority		21,066	54.5	
Turnout		38,660	74.5	
Labour hold		Swing		

General election February 1974: Bolsover
Party	Candidate	Votes	%	±%
Labour	Dennis Skinner	30,787	76.5	−1.03
Conservative	A.R. Dix	9,474	23.5	+1.03
Majority		21,313	52.9	−2.06
Turnout		40,261	78.4	
Labour hold		Swing		

General election 1970: Bolsover
Party	Candidate	Votes	%	±%
Labour	Dennis Skinner	28,830	77.5	
Conservative	Ivor J Humphrey	8,371	22.5	
Majority		20,459	55.0	
Turnout		37,201	70.76	
Labour hold		Swing		

=== Elections in the 1960s ===
General election 1966: Bolsover
Party	Candidate	Votes	%	±%
Labour	Harold Neal	30,114	81.55	
Conservative	Peter C Coleman	6,815	18.45	
Majority		23,299	63.10	
Turnout		36,929	74.62	
Labour hold		Swing		

General election 1964: Bolsover
Party	Candidate	Votes	%	±%
Labour	Harold Neal	31,234	79.34	
Conservative	Patrick Cormack	8,131	20.66	
Majority		23,103	58.68	
Turnout		39,365	78.89	
Labour hold		Swing		

=== Elections in the 1950s ===
General election 1959: Bolsover
Party	Candidate	Votes	%	±%
Labour	Harold Neal	32,536	78.2	−0.7
Conservative	Robin Marlar	9,076	21.8	+0.7
Majority		23,460	56.4	−1.3
Turnout		41,612	82.5	+4.9
Labour hold		Swing		

General election 1955: Bolsover
Party	Candidate	Votes	%	±%
Labour	Harold Neal	30,074	78.87	
Conservative	Brian RO Bell	8,055	21.13	
Majority		22,019	57.74	
Turnout		38,129	77.57	
Labour hold		Swing		

General election 1951: Bolsover
Party	Candidate	Votes	%	±%
Labour	Harold Neal	33,661	79.89	
Conservative	John Cordeaux	8,472	20.11	
Majority		25,189	59.78	
Turnout		42,133	85.36	
Labour hold		Swing		

General election 1950: Bolsover
Party	Candidate	Votes	%	±%
Labour	Harold Neal	34,017	80.6	
Conservative	John Cordeaux	8,184	19.4	
Majority		25,833	61.2	
Turnout		42,201	86.2	
Labour win (new seat)				

== See also ==
- parliamentary constituencies in Derbyshire
