= Charles Lloyd (Labour politician) =

British politician (1879–1939)

(Charles) Ellis Lloyd (1879 – 7 May 1939) was a Welsh novelist, barrister and Labour Party politician. He was elected at the 1929 general election as the Member of Parliament (MP) for Llandaff and Barry, having contested the seat unsuccessfully in 1924. He was defeated at the 1931 general election, and when he stood again in 1935 he massively reduced the Conservative majority, but not by enough to re-take the seat.

== Works ==
- Love and the Agitator (1911)
- Scarlet Nest (1919)
- A Master of Dreams (1921)

Parliament of the United Kingdom
Preceded by Sir William Cope	Member of Parliament for Llandaff and Barry; 1929 – 1931	Succeeded by Patrick Munro
