= Terence Donovan, Baron Donovan =

British politician (1898–1971)

The Right Honourable The Lord Donovan PC JP

Lord of Appeal in Ordinary
- In office 1964–1971
- Preceded by: The Lord Salmon

Member of Parliament for Leicester North East Leicester East 1945-1950
- In office 1945–1950
- Preceded by: Abraham Lyons
- Succeeded by: Sir Lynn Ungoed-Thomas

Personal details
- Born: Terence Norbert Donovan; 13 June 1898 West Ham, London, England
- Died: 12 December 1971 (aged 73) City of London, England
- Party: Labour

Terence Norbert Donovan, Baron Donovan PC JP (13 June 1898 – 12 December 1971) was a British Labour Party politician and later a Lord of Appeal in Ordinary.

== Biography ==
Born in West Ham, London, Donovan was educated at Brockley Grammar School, before serving in the Bedfordshire Regiment and the Royal Air Force during World War I. After demobilisation, he joined the Civil Service. He was called to the Bar by the Middle Temple in 1924, although he did not begin practising at the bar until 1932.

Donovan was elected as Member of Parliament for Leicester East in the 1945 general election, and took silk the same year. When that constituency was abolished for the 1950 general election, he was re-elected for the new Leicester North East constituency.

However, Donovan resigned from the House of Commons within weeks of the election, when he was appointed as a High Court judge, receiving the customary knighthood (his successor, Sir Lynn Ungoed-Thomas, also became a judge, in 1962). He was promoted to the Court of Appeal in 1960, when he also became a Privy Counsellor. On 11 January 1964 he was appointed as a Lord of Appeal in Ordinary, remaining in post until 1971. As a Law Lord he was given a life peerage as Baron Donovan, of Winchester in the County of Hampshire.

In 1965–68, he chaired the Royal Commission on Trade Unions and Employers' Associations (the so-called "Donovan commission") on the system of collective UK labour law. He died in the City of London aged 73.

== Arms ==
Coat of arms of Terence Donovan, Baron Donovan
Crest A grenade Sable fired proper winged Azure. Escutcheon Quarterly Gules and Ermine an open book proper bound and edged Or. Supporters On a compartment on either side upon the stock of a tree sprouting a peregrine falcon rising Proper.

Parliament of the United Kingdom
Preceded by Abraham Lyons	Member of Parliament for Leicester East; 1945–1950	Constituency abolished
New constituency	Member of Parliament for Leicester North East; Feb 1950–Sept 1950	Succeeded by Sir Lynn Ungoed-Thomas
