= Patrick Munro =

Scottish politician & Scotland international rugby union player

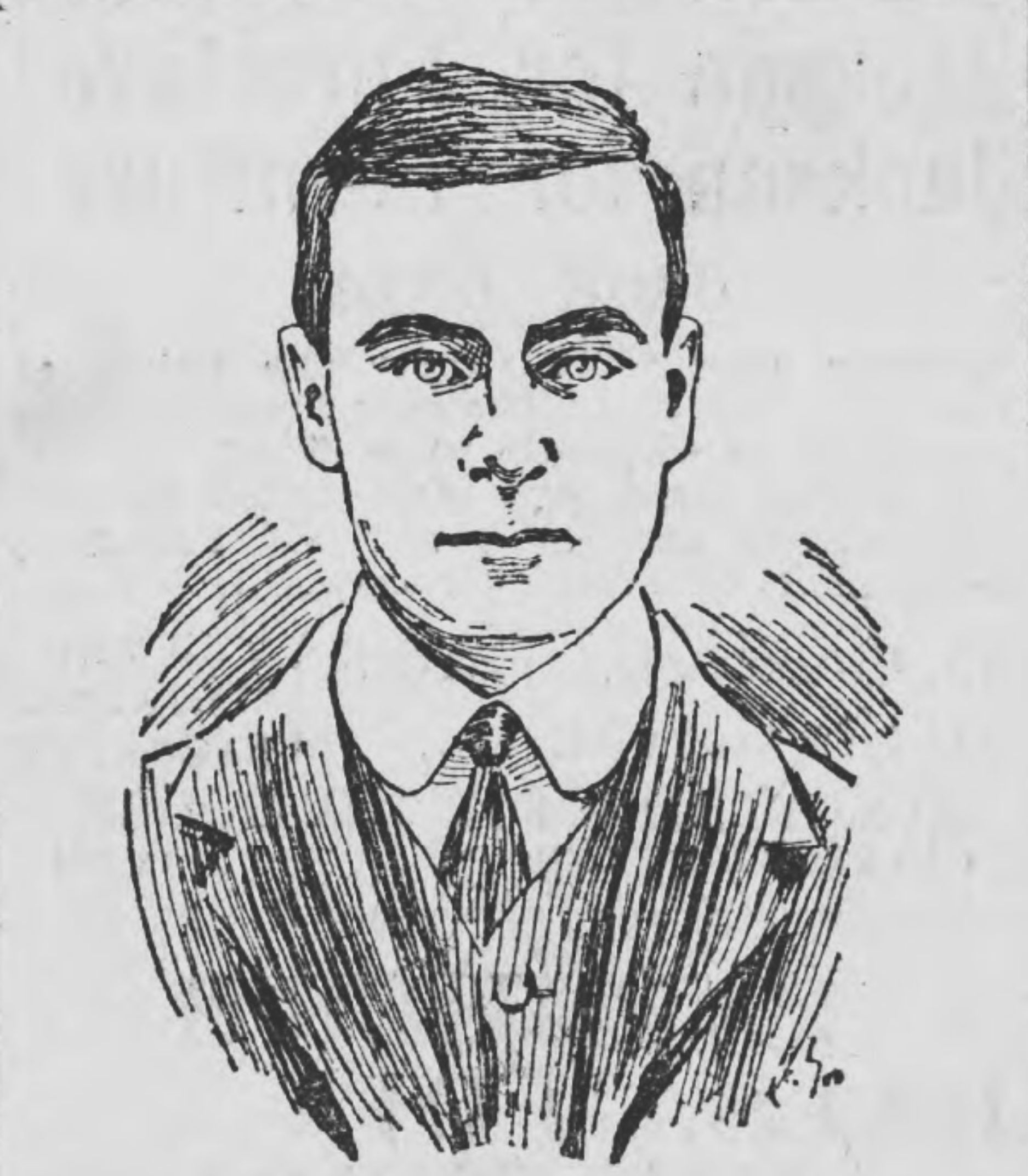
- Born: Patrick Munro; 9 October 1883 Partick, Glasgow, Scotland
- Died: 3 May 1942 (aged 58) Palace of Westminster, London, England

Rugby union career
- Position: Half back
Amateur team(s)
Years	Team	Apps	(Points)
- Oxford University
–	London Scottish		
Provincial / State sides
Years	Team	Apps	(Points)
1911	Whites Trial		
International career
Years	Team	Apps	(Points)
1905–1911	Scotland	13	(14)

59th President of the Scottish Rugby Union
- In office 1939–1942
- Preceded by: William Halliday Welsh
- Succeeded by: Harry Smith

Member of Parliament
- Incumbent: 1931–1942
- Parliamentary group: Conservative Party
- Constituency: Llandaff and Barry

Personal details
- Cause of death: Killed in action
- Spouse: Jessie Margaret Munro
- Awards: Order of the Nile

Military service
- Branch/service: British Army
- Rank: Private
- Unit: Palace of Westminster Home Guard
- Battles/wars: Second World War; Home Front †

Patrick Munro (9 October 1883 – 3 May 1942), also known as Pat Munro, was a Scotland international rugby union player and later a British Conservative politician.

== Rugby union career ==
=== Amateur career ===
He was educated at Leeds Grammar School and Christ Church, Oxford, where he held an Open History Scholarship and graduated with 2nd class Honours in History. He was also awarded a Half Blue for High Jump in 1906 and President of the Vincent's Club (the club for Oxford Blues) in 1906–1907.

He played for Oxford University RFC.

Munro was a Rugby Blue in 1903, 1904, 1905 (and Captain in 1905).

He also played for London Scottish FC.

=== Provincial career ===
He played for the Whites Trial side against the Blues Trial side on 21 January 1911, while still with London Scottish.

=== International career ===
He was capped thirteen times for Scotland between 1905 and 1911, and was also a rugby international for Scotland in 1905, 1906, 1907 and 1911. Munro captained the team in 1907 and 1911.

=== Administrative career ===
He was President of the Scottish Rugby Union for the period 1939 to 1942.

== Political career ==
=== Sudan ===
He joined the Sudan Political Service in 1907, and was Governor of Darfur Province in 1923-1924 and Governor of Khartoum Province from 1925 to 1929.

He was mentioned in dispatches in 1919 and awarded the Order of the Nile (3rd class) in 1929. He was a Member of British Delegation to the Capitulations Conference in Montreux in 1937.

=== Member of Parliament ===
He was Conservative Member of Parliament (MP) for Llandaff and Barry from 1931 until his death. He was Parliamentary Private Secretary to Capt. Euan Wallace when he was Under-Secretary of State for the Home Department in 1935 and then Secretary for Overseas Trade. Munro went on to be a Junior Government Whip in 1937, resigning in March 1942.

He joined the government payroll as a Junior Lord of the Treasury later that year and served until his death.

== Military service and death ==
Munro, a private in the Home Guard, died on 3 May 1942 whilst taking part in a military exercise at Westminster. The exercise was a simulation of a landing by airborne troops in central London in tandem with fifth-column activities as a test of Home Guard defences. As a member of the Palace of Westminster Home Guard, Munro was acting as a runner and was in the Liberal Whips' room with two company colleagues. It was there that he collapsed suddenly and died before he could be taken for aid.

He is buried Cathedine (St. Michael) Churchyard in Brecknockshire under the care of the Commonwealth War Graves Commission.

== Family ==
Munro was the fifth son of Patrick Munro and Mary Helen Catherine Dormond.

Munro was married in 1911 to Jessie Margaret Munro of Bwlch in Wales.

== See also ==
- List of Scottish rugby union players killed in World War II

Parliament of the United Kingdom
Preceded by Charles Ellis Lloyd	Member of Parliament for Llandaff and Barry; 1931–1942	Succeeded by Cyril Lakin
