= Breckland Group Holdings Ltd v London and Suffolk Properties =

Breckland Group Holdings Ltd v London & Suffolk Properties Ltd
- Court: High Court
- Citation: [1989] BCLC 100

Case opinions
- Harman J

Keywords
- Corporate litigation

Breckland Group Holdings Ltd v London & Suffolk Properties Ltd [1989] BCLC 100 is a UK company law case, concerning the right of a majority shareholder to litigate in the company's name.

== Facts ==
A majority shareholder attempted to start litigation in the company's name against the managing director. The board challenged the litigation, arguing it had no authority to do so even with a shareholder resolution.

== Judgment ==
Harman J held that the litigation could not be continued. After noting that the responsibility of the board is collective, not individual and the power of the board is invested in the whole, he said,

there is little doubt that the law is that where matters are confided by articles such as art. 80 to the conduct of the business by the directors, it is not a matter where the general meeting can intervene.

== Significance ==
This was a contentious opinion, and most academic treatises view the law to be that in fact a majority shareholder may by ordinary resolution bring litigation. This is seen to follow implicitly from the rule in Foss v Harbottle, and the House of Lords judgment in Alexander Ward v Samyang.

== See also ==
- UK company law
- Foss v Harbottle
- Alexander Ward v Samyang [1975] 2 All ER 424
- Danish Mercantile Co Ltd v Beaumont
