= William Cope, 1st Baron Cope =

Welsh politician & rugby union footballer

The Right Honourable The Lord Cope TD JP
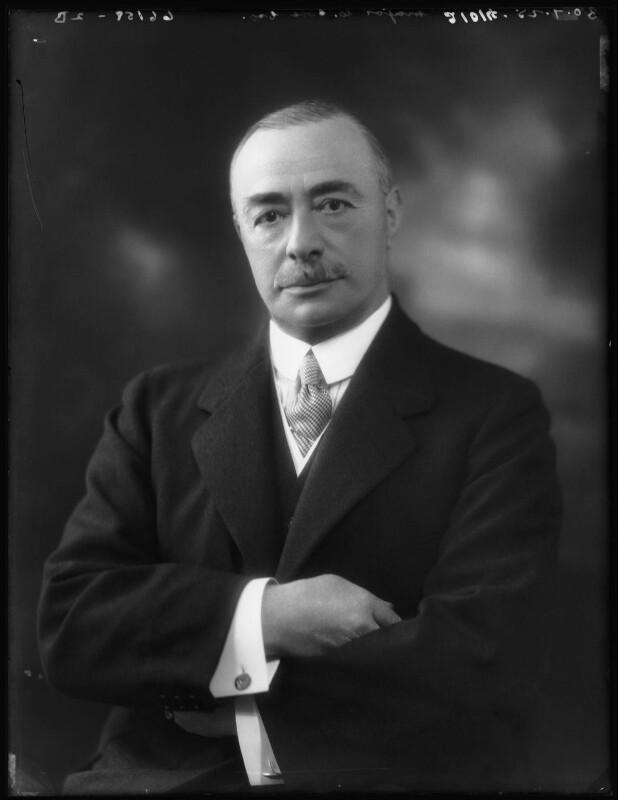
- Born: William Cope; 18 August 1870; Roath, Wales
- Died: 15 July 1946 (aged 75); St Mellons, Wales
- Education: Repton School; Clare College, Cambridge (MA)
- Occupation: Politician

Rugby union career
- Position: Forward
Amateur team(s)
Years	Team	Apps	(Points)
- Cambridge University R.U.F.C.
1891–1895	Cardiff RFC		
- Blackheath F.C.
1891–?	Barbarian F.C.		
International career
Years	Team	Apps	(Points)
1896	Wales	1	(0)

William Cope, 1st Baron Cope, TD, JP (18 August 1870 – 15 July 1946), known as Sir William Cope, Bt, between 1928 and 1945, was a Welsh Conservative Party politician, who was also notable as an international rugby union player for Wales. He was Member of Parliament for Llandaff and Barry from 1918 to 1929, was made a baronet in 1928 and elevated to the peerage as Baron Cope in July 1945.

== Background and education ==
He was born in Roath, Cardiff, in 1870. He was educated at Repton School and matriculated at Clare College, Cambridge in 1888, graduating B.A. in 1891 and M.A. in 1895. He was admitted to the Inner Temple, and in 1894 was called to the bar. He practised as a London barrister for about nine years.

His father, who died in 1933, was described in an obituary as "a pioneer of the South Wales coal trade". He was associated with Cardiff Docks, and chaired the board of the Albion Steam Coal Company, which ran the Albion colliery. William Cope joined the board in 1907. The position came to an end in 1910, with a takeover by the Cambrian Combine.

== Political career ==
With the outbreak of World War I in 1914, Cope joined the Glamorgan Yeomanry, rising to the rank of major. He failed a medical test for military service abroad. In 1918, he ran for Parliament, winning for the seat of Llandaff and Barry. In 1923 he became a Junior Lord of the Treasury, a post he held until 1928, with a break during the brief Labour Government of 1924. In the 1928 Birthday Honours he was created a baronet, of St Mellons in the County of Monmouth.

After the Treasury Cope was given the role of Comptroller of the Royal Household, a role he undertook for just a year when he left government in 1929. He held several offices in his home county of Glamorgan. He was a Justice of the Peace, and a Deputy Lieutenant and in 1932 was made High Sheriff of Glamorgan. In 1933 he was invested as a King's Council. In July 1945 he was elevated to the peerage as Baron Cope, of St Mellons in the County of Monmouth.

== Rugby career ==
Cope first came to note as a rugby player when he played for Cambridge University while a student. In 1891 he played in The Varsity Match against Oxford, gaining a sporting Blue. From 1891 through to 1895 Cope turned out for his home club of Cardiff, and after leaving university he also represented first class English team Blackheath. During the 1891–1892 season Cope became a member of invitational team the Barbarians in only their second year.

Four years later, Cope was selected to represent Wales as part of the 1896 Home Nations Championship in a match against Scotland. Cope was brought in to a much changed team after a disastrous opening match of the tournament against England; the selectors reacting to a 25–0 scoreline by selecting five new caps in the pack. Cope was one of the new members, who under the leadership of Arthur "Monkey" Gould, managed to beat Scotland 6–0. Despite the victory, this was Cope's only international game, being replaced by a returning Arthur Boucher in the next match of the Championship.

== Family ==
Cope married Helen Shuldham (died 21 January 1961), daughter of Alexander Shuldham of Flowerfield, County Londonderry, Ireland, on 5 September 1900. They had two children. He died in July 1946, aged 75, when the baronetcy and barony became extinct: their son and heir to the titles William Shuldham Cope had died in Australia in the preceding years. Quarry Hill House in Cardiff was a family property.

William Shuldham Cope was born in 1902. He was educated at Eton College, and joined the Welsh Guards. In 1928 he was a sheep farmer in New Zealand. Later he was in Calgary, working for the Quaker Finance Corporation. The daughter, Helen Margaret Letitia, married in 1940 Stephen John Valentine Simpson of Spitchwick.

== Bibliography ==
- Davies, D.E. (1975). Cardiff Rugby Club, History and Statistics 1876–1975. Risca: The Starling Press. ISBN 0-9504421-0-0.

Parliament of the United Kingdom
New constituency	Member of Parliament for Llandaff and Barry; 1918–1929	Succeeded by Charles Ellis Lloyd
Political offices
Preceded by Sir Harry Barnston	Comptroller of the Household; 1928–1929	Succeeded by Thomas Henderson
Peerage of the United Kingdom
New creation	Baron Cope; 1945–1946	extinct
Baronetage of the United Kingdom
New creation	Baronet (of St Mellons); 1928–1946	Extinct
