= 1962 Leicester North East by-election =

UK Parliamentary by-election

The 1962 Leicester North East by-election was held on 12 July 1962 when the incumbent Labour MP Sir Lynn Ungoed-Thomas was appointed a High Court Judge. It was retained by the Labour candidate, Tom Bradley.

The by-election was affected by the refusal of many Conservative activists in Leicestershire and nearby Rutland to campaign, with some actively supporting the Liberal candidate.

As a consequence of the Conservatives falling into third place behind the Liberals, Harold Macmillan reshuffled his cabinet removing seven ministers, including Chancellor of the Exchequer, Selwyn Lloyd who was held responsible for the unpopularity of the pay pause policy. This mass removal of ministers, referred to as ‘the night of the long knives', smacked of desperation and caused many people to question Macmillan's political judgment.

Leicester North East by-election, 1962
Party	Candidate	Votes	%	±%
Labour	Tom Bradley	11,274	41.48	−10.43
Liberal	David Bond	9,326	34.31	New
Conservative	Robin Marlar	6,578	24.20	−23.89
Majority		1,948	7.17	+3.34
Turnout		27,178		
Labour hold		Swing	+22.37	
