= Jeremiah Harman (judge) =

English high court judge (1930–2021)

Sir Jeremiah Harman
- Royal coat of arms of the United Kingdom

Justice of the High Court
- In office 1982–1998

Personal details
- Born: Jeremiah Le Roy Harman; 13 April 1930 Kensington, London, England
- Died: 6 March 2021 (aged 90) Chelsea, London, England
- Occupation: Judge
- Profession: Barrister

Sir Jeremiah Le Roy Harman (13 April 1930 – 6 March 2021) was an English barrister and High Court judge. His judicial service was marred by a series of gaffes and high-profile incidents, culminating in his resignation in 1998 after being subject severe criticism by the Court of Appeal for delays in handing down a judgment.

== Early life ==
Harman was born on 13 April 1930 in Kensington, London, England, to Sir Charles Harman and Helen Sarah Le Roy Lewis. Harman was educated at Eton College, an all-boys public school (independent boarding school) in Berkshire.

=== Military service ===
Following school, Harman joined the British Army in 1948 and was commissioned into the Royal Hampshire Regiment; he claimed to have served in the Coldstream Guards. On 4 May 1950, he transferred to the Parachute Regiment as a second lieutenant with seniority in that rank from 27 February 1949. He transferred to the Territorial Army as an acting lieutenant on 1 January 1951 with seniority from 1 December 1950, and was promoted to substantive lieutenant on 13 April 1953 with seniority from 1 December 1950. He transferred to the Territorial Army Reserve of Officers on 14 October 1955, thereby ending his military service.

== Legal career ==
He was called to the bar at Lincoln's Inn in 1954. He was appointed a judge of the High Court's Chancery Division in 1982.

He was known for his comments which were taken to reinforce the popular public stereotype of judges being out of touch with everyday life. He claimed not to have heard of Oasis at the height of their fame in 1996, and not to be familiar with "Gazza" as the nickname for Paul Gascoigne in 1990 when he was the subject of media interest due to his performances at the 1990 World Cup.

When a female witness indicated that she preferred to be addressed as "Ms", Mr Justice Harman was reported to have said to her: "I've always thought there were only three kinds of women: wives, whores and mistresses."

In 1992 he tried to kick a taxi driver whom he mistook for a press photographer trying to take his briefcase.

Two of Harman's more notable decisions were:

- Cornhill Insurance plc v Improvement Services Ltd
- Breckland Group Holdings Ltd v London and Suffolk Properties

But he handed down a number of reported judicial decisions during his career.

== Resignation ==
He resigned his position in 1998 after being subject to severe criticism by the Court of Appeal for not handing down a judgment until 20 months after the hearing. For the year 2000 he served as Treasurer of Lincoln's Inn.

== Personal life ==
Harman married three times. He was married to Helen Gillian Wharton from 1955 to 1958. From 1960 to 1987 he was married to Erica Jane Bridgeman, daughter of the Hon. Sir Maurice Bridgeman. They had two sons and one daughter.

In 1987 he married thirdly, Katharine Frances Goddard Pulay (died 2002), daughter of the Rt. Hon. Sir Eric Sachs.

In 2021 Harman died in his home in Chelsea, London, after suffering from cancer.

== Arms ==
Coat of arms of Jeremiah Harman
Notes Displayed at the Great Hall of Lincoln's Inn
