= Llandaff and Barry =

UK Parliament constituency (1918–1950)

- Former county constituency for the House of Commons
- Preserved county: Glamorganshire
- Major settlements: Llandaff, Barry

1918–1950
- Seats: One
- Created from: South Glamorganshire
- Replaced by: Barry and Cardiff West

Llandaff and Barry was a county constituency centred on the towns of Llandaff and Barry in Wales. It returned one Member of Parliament to the House of Commons of the Parliament of the United Kingdom.

The constituency was created for the 1918 general election. Initial proposals were to call the division "Llandaff" but there was opposition from local representatives of Barry and Glamorgan. The constituency was abolished for the 1950 general election.

== Boundaries ==
The Urban District of Barry, and the Rural District of Llandaff and Dinas Powis..

== Members of Parliament ==
Election	Member	Party
1918	Sir William Cope	Conservative
1929	Charles Lloyd	Labour
1931	Patrick Munro	Conservative
1942 by-election	Cyril Lakin	Conservative
1945	Lynn Ungoed-Thomas	Labour
1950	constituency abolished	

== Elections ==
=== Elections in the 1910s ===
General election 1918: Llandaff and Barry
Party		Candidate	Votes	%	±%
C	Unionist	William Cope	13,307	62.0	
	Labour	Russell Lowell Jones	6,607	30.8	
	Independent	Charles Frederick Gilborne Sixsmith	1,539	7.2	
Majority			6,700	31.2	
Turnout			21,453	63.0	
	Unionist win (new seat)				
C indicates candidate endorsed by the coalition government.

=== Elections in the 1920s ===
General election 1922: Llandaff and Barry
Party	Candidate	Votes	%	±%
Unionist	William Cope	13,129	44.1	−17.9
Labour	James Lovat-Fraser	9,031	30.4	−0.4
Liberal	John Claxton Meggitt	7,577	25.5	New
Majority		4,098	13.7	−17.5
Turnout		29,737	76.8	+13.8
Unionist hold		Swing	-8.7	

General election 1923: Llandaff and Barry
Party	Candidate	Votes	%	±%
Unionist	William Cope	11,050	37.9	−6.2
Liberal	Elfyn Williams David	10,213	35.1	+9.6
Labour	Thomas F. Worrall	7,871	27.0	−3.4
Majority		837	2.8	−10.9
Turnout		29,134	72.1	−4.7
Unionist hold		Swing	-7.9	

General election 1924: Llandaff and Barry
Party	Candidate	Votes	%	±%
Unionist	William Cope	15,801	46.8	+8.9
Labour	Charles Lloyd	11,609	34.3	+7.3
Liberal	Elfyn Williams David	6,389	18.9	−16.2
Majority		4,192	12.5	+9.7
Turnout		33,799	80.2	+8.1
Unionist hold		Swing		

General election 1929: Llandaff and Barry
Party	Candidate	Votes	%	±%
Labour	Charles Lloyd	21,468	40.8	+6.5
Unionist	William Cope	18,799	35.7	−11.1
Liberal	Ewan Davies	12,352	23.5	+4.6
Majority		2,669	5.1	N/A
Turnout		52,619	82.5	+2.3
Labour gain from Unionist		Swing		

=== Elections in the 1930s ===
General election 1931: Llandaff and Barry
Party	Candidate	Votes	%	±%
Conservative	Patrick Munro	33,590	60.7	+25.0
Labour	Charles Lloyd	21,767	39.3	+15.8
Majority		11,823	21.4	N/A
Turnout		55,357	81.8	−0.7
Conservative gain from Labour		Swing		

General election 1935: Llandaff and Barry
Party	Candidate	Votes	%	±%
Conservative	Patrick Munro	29,099	51.2	−9.5
Labour	Charles Lloyd	27,677	48.7	+9.4
Majority		1,422	2.5	−18.9
Turnout		56,776	77.0	−4.8
Conservative hold		Swing		

General Election 1939–40

Another General Election was required to take place before the end of 1940. The political parties had been making preparations for an election to take place and by the Autumn of 1939, the following candidates had been selected;

- Conservative: Patrick Munro
- Labour: Lynn Ungoed-Thomas

=== Elections in the 1940s ===
1942 Llandaff and Barry by-election
Party	Candidate	Votes	%	±%
Conservative	Cyril Lakin	19,408	56.9	+5.7
Ind. Socialist	Kim Mackay	13,753	40.3	New
Independent Welsh Nationalist	Rolle Malcolm Ritson Paton	975	2.9	New
Majority		5,655	16.6	+14.1
Turnout		34,136	41.5	−35.5
Conservative hold		Swing		

General election 1945: Llandaff and Barry
Party	Candidate	Votes	%	±%
Labour	Lynn Ungoed-Thomas	33,706	47.5	−1.2
Conservative	Cyril Lakin	27,108	38.2	−13.0
Liberal	Morgan Edward Bransby-Williams	10,132	14.3	New
Majority		6,598	9.3	N/A
Turnout		70,946	73.8	−3.2
Labour gain from Conservative		Swing		
