= Natalie Fleet =

British politician (born 1984)

Natalie Fleet MP
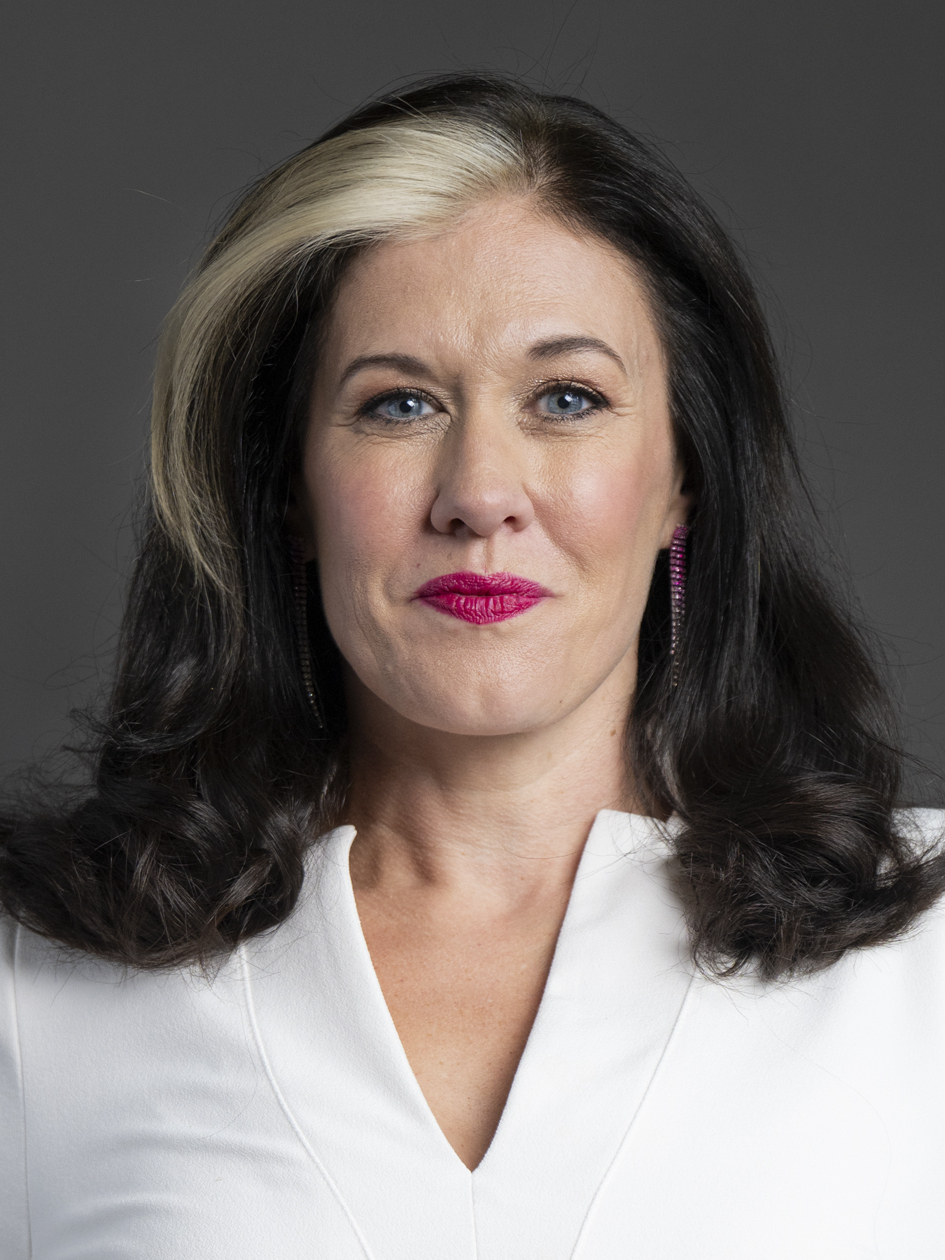
- Official portrait, 2024

Parliamentary Under-Secretary of State for Safeguarding and Violence Against Women and Girls
- In office 12 May 2026 – 22 July 2026
- Prime Minister: Keir Starmer; Andy Burnham
- Preceded by: Jess Phillips
- Succeeded by: Satvir Kaur

Member of Parliament for Bolsover
- Incumbent
- Assumed office 4 July 2024
- Preceded by: Mark Fletcher
- Majority: 6,323 (14.9%)

Personal details
- Born: 24 May 1984 (age 42)
- Party: Labour
- Spouse: Ritchie Fleet (m. 2007)
- Children: 4

Natalie Fleet (born 24 May 1984) is a British politician who served as Parliamentary Under-Secretary of State for Safeguarding and Violence Against Women and Girls from May to July 2026. A member of the Labour Party, she has been the Member of Parliament (MP) for Bolsover since 2024.

== Early life and career ==
Fleet was born on 24 May 1984 and raised in Ashfield, Nottinghamshire. Her mother is a former factory worker and her father and other family members were coal miners. As a child, she received free school meals and experienced homelessness.

Fleet worked in the voluntary sector before working for trade unions, including the National Education Union.

== Political career ==
Fleet joined the Labour Party as a teenager. She was the Labour candidate for Ashfield at the 2019 general election, finishing in third place in the seat Labour had won in 2017. She received threats and her campaign office was vandalised during the election campaign and she chose not to contest the seat again due to safety concerns.

Fleet was elected as the first female MP for Bolsover at the 2024 general election, defeating the incumbent Conservative Mark Fletcher. She had failed to win the initial candidate selection, and subsequently won following the winner's resignation.

In November 2024, Fleet voted in favour of the Terminally Ill Adults (End of Life) Bill, which proposes to legalise assisted dying.

On 12 May 2026, she was appointed Parliamentary Under-Secretary of State for Safeguarding and Violence Against Women and Girls, succeeding Jess Phillips who had resigned during the 2026 leadership crisis.

On 13 July 2026, following a backlash led by Ashfield's Reform MP, Lee Anderson, Fleet apologised and withdrew a tweet which said "Nigel Farage and his gang of binmen get the same security as the rest of us. Sick of the faux outrage" in response to Farage having said, in relation to Ann Widdecombe's death, that the police and parliamentary authorities were failing to protect MPs.

On 22 July 2026, she resigned as minister one day after Andy Burnham became prime minister, stating that the role was too "triggering".

== Personal life ==
She married Richie Fleet in 2007. They have four children and one grandchild.

After her election as an MP in 2024, she said in an interview on GB News that she had been groomed at the age of 15 by an older man, and became pregnant with her first daughter as a result of statutory rape. Fleet has spoken of wanting to be a voice for other women who are victims of grooming and sexual violence. As of June 2025 she was working to remove parental rights from rapists.

== See also ==
- List of MPs elected in the 2024 United Kingdom general election

Parliament of the United Kingdom
Preceded by Mark Fletcher	Member of Parliament for Bolsover; 2024–present	Incumbent
