= Lynn Ungoed-Thomas =

British politician (1904–1972)

Sir Arwyn Lynn Ungoed-Thomas

Member of Parliament for Llandaff and Barry
- In office 1945–1950
- Preceded by: Cyril Lakin
- Succeeded by: Constituency abolished

Member of Parliament for Leicester North East
- In office 1950–1962
- Preceded by: Terence Donovan
- Succeeded by: Tom Bradley

Solicitor General for England and Wales
- In office April 1951 – October 1951
- Preceded by: Frank Soskice
- Succeeded by: Reginald Manningham-Buller

Personal details
- Born: 29 June 1904 Carmarthen, Wales
- Died: 4 December 1972 (aged 68)
- Party: Labour
- Spouse: Dorothy Wolfe (m. 1933)
- Children: 3
- Parent: Evan Ungoed-Thomas (father)
- Education: Queen Elizabeth Grammar School; Haileybury College
- Alma mater: Magdalen College, Oxford
- Military career
- Allegiance: United Kingdom
- Branch: British Army
- Service years: 1939-45
- Rank: Major
- Conflicts: World War II

Rugby union career
Senior career
Years	Team	Apps	(Points)
1931	Leicester Tigers	8	(8)

Sir Arwyn Lynn Ungoed-Thomas (29 June 1904 – 4 December 1972) was a Welsh Labour Party politician and British judge.

== Personal life ==
He was born on 29 June 1904, the son of Evan Ungoed-Thomas, minister of Tabernacle Welsh Baptist Church, Carmarthen, for more than forty years. He was educated at Queen Elizabeth Grammar School (Carmarthen), Haileybury College and Magdalen College, Oxford. He married on 19 April 1933 to Dorothy, the daughter of Jasper Travers Wolfe of county Cork. They had two sons and one daughter.

Ungoed-Thomas played rugby union for Leicester Tigers in 1931, featuring in eight games between January and March and scoring two tries.

== Career ==
Before his political career, he served in the army throughout World War II, where he became a major.

He was elected at the 1945 general election as Member of Parliament (MP) for the Welsh constituency of Llandaff and Barry. His seat was abolished for the 1950 general election, but shortly afterwards the Labour MP for the new Leicester North East constituency became a High Court judge, and Ungoed-Thomas was returned to Parliament in the resulting Leicester North East by-election. Between April 1951 and October 1951, he served as Solicitor General, and received the customary knighthood.

He held the seat until he resigned from the House of Commons in 1962, when he became a High Court judge, assigned to the Chancery Division. He remained on the High Court until his death in 1972.

== The European Convention on Human Rights ==
He was a member of the British delegation to the Council of Europe, where he argued strongly for the creation of the European Convention on Human Rights. However, he opposed the creation of a Court to oversee the implementation of the convention and to provide the protections within it. He, along with Rolin of France, proposed on 6 September 1949 that the Legal Committee's recommendation of a Court be rejected. They believed that both a European Commission of Human Rights and a European Court of Human Rights were unnecessary. One of several objections they had was the proposal that individuals, not just states, could seek redress for alleged violations through the Court. Ungoed-Thomas opposed the right to individual petition because he felt that individuals could "bring one of the States to trial even after examination and with the authority of a 'sorting organization'".

After two days of debate on the issue, on 8 September 1949, Rolin and Ungoed-Thomas' amendment rejecting a European Court of Human Rights was itself rejected.

Ungoed-Thomas then proposed that individuals not be allowed to petition the Commission.

"Personally I object to this right of individuals going to the Commission for this reason. I foresee shoals of applications being made by individuals who imagine that they have a complaint of one kind or another against the country ... In my opinion the objection to the Commission is as great as the objection to the Court."

He was supported in this objection by the likes of Sundt of Norway who felt that the right of individual petition would open a flood of claims against signatory States.

Ultimately, the right to individual petition became an optional clause, in part due to these objections raised, under the original Article 25 of the convention. The right of individual petition has been mandatory since the adoption of a revised European Convention on Human Rights in 1998. (new Article 34).

== Judicial career ==
As a judge he is remembered for his much-cited judgement in the tax case Cheney v Conn (1968). Other notable decisions of his included:

- Butt v Kelson [1952] Ch 197 (as counsel)
- Kevin McClory v Ian Fleming 1963
- Re Golay's Will Trusts [1965] 1 WLR 969
- Cunliffe-Owen v Teather & Greenwood [1967] 1 WLR 1421, terms implied by custom
- Mann v Goldstein [1968] 1 WLR 1091
- Selangor United Rubber Estates Ltd v Cradock (No 3) [1968] 1 WLR 1555
- Bushell v Faith [1970] AC 1099 (at first instance)
- Hodgson v Marks [1971] Ch 892 (at first instance)

Parliament of the United Kingdom
Preceded by Cyril Lakin	Member of Parliament for Llandaff and Barry; 1945–1950	Constituency abolished
Preceded by Terence Donovan	Member of Parliament for Leicester North East; 1950–1962	Succeeded by Tom Bradley
Legal offices
Preceded by Frank Soskice	Solicitor General for England and Wales; April 1951–October 1951	Succeeded by Reginald Manningham-Buller
