= Mann v Goldstein =

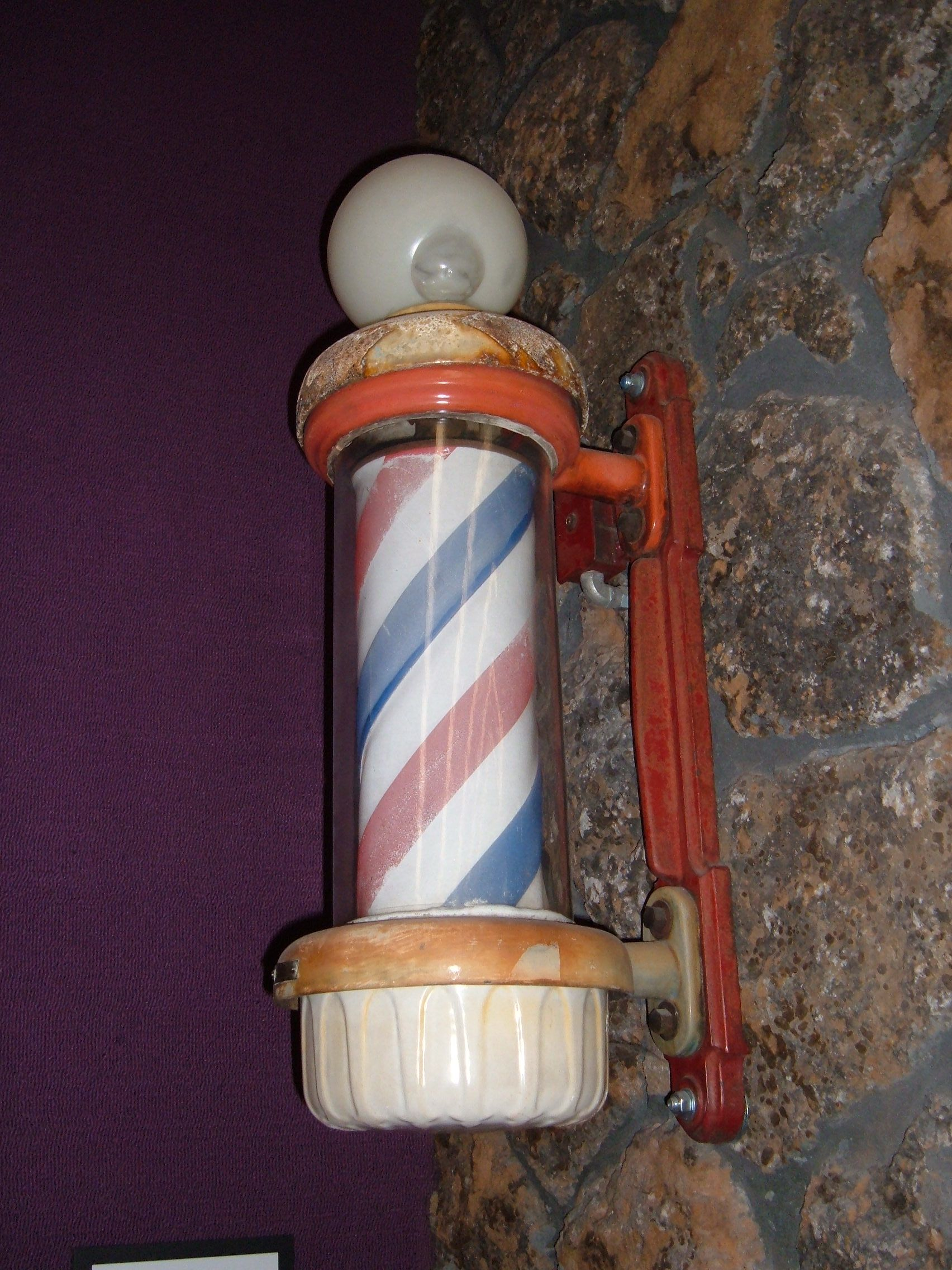
- Court: High Court
- Citation: [1968] 1 WLR 1091

Case opinions
- Ungoed-Thomas J

Keywords
- Liquidation

Mann v Goldstein [1968] 1 WLR 1091 is a UK insolvency law case concerning the bringing of a winding up petition when a company is alleged to be unable to repay its debts.

== Facts ==
Peter and Anita Mann sought an injunction against a winding up petition by Mr Sidney Goldstein and his wife, as well as Wallander Laboratories Ltd, on the ground that the debts were under dispute. The four people were equal shareholders in two hairdressing businesses, Joanita Ltd in Pinner, London, managed by Mr Mann, and Chairmaine Coiffeur d’Art Ltd in Haverstock Hill, run by Mr Goldstein. Wallander Ltd sold wigs They fell out, and negotiated to separate the businesses, but these failed. Mr Goldstein brought the winding up petition alleging that he was owed £1869 16s 3d in directors’ fees, declared by Joanita in 1959-1960 but not paid. Mr Mann did not dispute this, but argued that more than this was paid out in £15 weekly sums from 1965 to 1967. Wallands Ltd argued it was owed £340 16s 6d for goods from Charmaine Ltd’s subsidiary, while the Manns argued that this was in fact owed by another company, Charmaine Marguerite Ltd.

== Judgment ==
Ungoed Thomas J held that the winding up petition could not succeed. It would be an abuse of process to ask for a winding up petition when a debt was bona fide under dispute. Here, the parties were actually disputing the existence of the debt, so the winding up petition had to be rejected. His judgment was as follows.

The defendants, however, relied on the observation of Sir George Jessel MR in Niger Merchants Co. v. Capper, 18 Ch.D. 557, 559 that “Where a company is insolvent no doubt it is reasonable to wind *1095 up the company, even where the debt is disputed.” But this statement is tentatively phrased in an apparently unreserved judgment unreported at the time in the early period of the development of the jurisdiction, and, so far as I know, stands alone. Of course, judges, with due regard to the facts of the particular cases before them, have, naturally, referred to the company's solvency or insolvency, as the case may be, as emphasising the desirability of their dismissal of an application to restrain winding-up proceedings or of granting an injunction to restrain such proceedings, as the case might be. But there is no authority, so far as I have been able to ascertain, to support the suggestion that a company might be wound up on a creditor's petition where the company is insolvent though the debt upon which the petition is founded is disputed. It seems to me to be neither in accordance with the requirements of the Companies Act nor the practice recognised by Lord Greene M.R. and I do not consider it justifiable to treat Sir George Jessel's observation as other than the incidental and tentative observation which it appears to me to be.

To enable the Companies Court to make the winding-up order itself, not only must the petitioner have been shown to be entitled to present the petition, but one of the grounds specified in section 222 of the Companies Act must be established: and the only such ground relied on in the petition and before me was that the company is unable to pay its debts. This requirement is additional to the pre-condition of presenting the petition, that the petitioner must be a creditor, and is not alternative to it. But the insolvency requirement, unlike the creditor requirement, is only a prerequisite of the order and not a prerequisite of the presentation of the petition. So if a person is entitled to present a petition, then the company's inability to pay its debts is the very matter which it is appropriate for the Companies Court to enquire into and decide in the exercise of its jurisdiction to make a winding-up order.

I come now to the allegation of lack of bona fides and to abuse of process. It seems to me that to pursue a substantial claim in accordance with the procedure provided and in the normal manner, even though with personal hostility or even venom, and from some ulterior motive, such as the hope of compromise or some indirect advantage, is not an abuse of the process of the court or acting mala fide but acting bona fide in accordance with the process. And certainly no authority suggesting otherwise has been brought to my attention. In In re Welsh Brick Industries [1946] 2 All ER 197 Lord Greene MR treated a bona fide claim as being a claim based on some substantial ground when he referred to “considering whether or not the dispute is a bona fide dispute, or, putting it in another way, whether or not there is some substantial ground for defending the action.” And, so far as is material here, the winding-up process provides that the petition shall be presented by a creditor and that the winding-up order shall be on the ground that the company is unable to pay its debts. As Malins V.-C. said in Cadiz Waterworks Co. v. Barnett, (1874) L.R. 19 Eq. 182, 196 if the court “sees a petition to wind up presented, not for a bona fide purpose of winding up the company, but for some collateral and sinister object, on that ground it will be dismissed with costs.” There the purpose of winding up the company is treated as a bona fide purpose in contrast with some purpose other than the winding up of the company.

What then is the course for this court to take (1) when the creditor's debt is clearly established; (2) when it is clearly established that there is no debt; and (3) when the debt is disputed on substantial grounds?

(1) When the creditor's debt is clearly established it seems to me to follow that this court would not, in general at any rate, interfere even though the company would appear to be solvent, for the creditor would as such be entitled to present a petition and the debtor would have his own remedy in paying the undisputed debt which he should pay. So, to persist in non-payment of the debt in such circumstances would itself either suggest inability to pay or that the application was an application that the court should give the debtor relief which it itself could provide, but would not provide, by paying the debt. Further, the winding-up order on the ground of inability to pay debts would be the very matter which it would be for the Companies Court to decide after presentation of the petition: and validly to present a creditor's petition which the company inexplicably would not pay could hardly, in general at any rate, be an abuse of the process of the court.
(2) When it is clearly established that there is no debt, it seems to me similarly to follow that there is no creditor, that the person claiming to be such has no locus standi and that his petition is bound to fail. Once that becomes clear, pursuit of the petition would be an abuse of process, and this court would restrain its presentation or advertisement. Indeed, I understood counsel for the second defendant to concede this proposition.
(3) When the debt is disputed by the company on some substantial ground (and not just on some ground which is frivolous or without substance and which the court should, therefore, ignore) and the company is solvent, the court will restrain the prosecution of a petition to wind up the company. As Malins V.-C. said in Cadiz Waterworks Co. v. Barnett,8 of a winding-up application:

“It is not a remedy intended by the legislature, or that ought ever to be applied, to enforce payment of a debt where these circumstances exist — solvency and a disputed debt.”

As Sir George Jessel M.R. said in the judgment from which I have already quoted: “When a company is solvent, the right course is to bring an action for the debt.” So, to pursue a winding-up petition in such circumstances is an abuse of the process of the court.

I would prefer to rest the jurisdiction directly on the comparatively simple propositions that a creditor’s petition can only be presented by a creditor, that the winding up jurisdiction is not for the purpose of deciding a disputed debt (that is, disputed on substantial and not insubstantial grounds) since, until a creditor is established as a creditor he is not entitled to present the petition and has no locus standi in the Companies Court; and that, therefore, to invoke the winding up jurisdiction when the debt is disputed (that is, on substantial grounds) or after it has become clear that it is so disputed is an abuse of process of the court.

== See also ==
- UK insolvency law
