= Parliamentary constituencies in Derbyshire =

The ceremonial county of Derbyshire (which includes the unitary authority of Derby) is divided into 11 parliamentary constituencies: three borough constituencies and eight county constituencies. Since the 2024 general election, all eleven constituencies have been represented by members of the Labour Party.

== Constituencies ==
† Conservative ‡ Labour ¤ Reform

| Constituency (Note: BC denotes borough constituency, CC denotes county constituency.) | Electorate | Majority (Note: The majority is the number of votes the winning candidate receives more than their nearest rival.) | Member of Parliament | Nearest opposition | Map |
|---|---|---|---|---|---|
| Amber Valley CC | 70,625 | 3,554 | Linsey Farnsworth ‡ | Alex Stevenson ¤ | |
| Bolsover CC | 74,680 | 6,323 | Natalie Fleet ‡ | Mark Fletcher † | |
| Chesterfield BC | 70,722 | 10,820 | Toby Perkins ‡ | Ben Flook † | |
| Derby North BC | 71,867 | 8,915 | Catherine Atkinson ‡ | Amanda Solloway † | |
| Derby South BC | 72,067 | 6,002 | Baggy Shanker ‡ | Alan Graves ¤ | |
| Derbyshire Dales CC | 71,435 | 350 | John Whitby ‡ | Sarah Dines † | |
| Erewash CC | 71,986 | 5,859 | Adam Thompson ‡ | Maggie Throup † | |
| High Peak CC | 73,960 | 7,908 | Jon Pearce ‡ | Robert Largan † | |
| Mid Derbyshire CC | 70,085 | 1,878 | Jonathan Davies ‡ | Luke Gardiner † | |
| North East Derbyshire CC | 72,344 | 1,753 | Louise Sandher-Jones ‡ | Lee Rowley † | |
| South Derbyshire CC | 71,202 | 4,168 | Samantha Niblett ‡ | Heather Wheeler † | |

== Boundary changes ==
See 2023 Periodic Review of Westminster constituencies for further details.

| Constituency name | Boundaries 2010-2024 | Boundaries 2024–present |
|---|---|---|
| 1. Amber Valley CC; 2. Bolsover CC; 3. Chesterfield BC; 4. Derby North BC; 5. Derby South BC; 6. Derbyshire Dales CC; 7. Erewash CC; 8. High Peak CC; 9. Mid Derbyshire CC; 10. North East Derbyshire CC; 11. South Derbyshire CC | 2010-2024 Boundaries | Boundaries 2024-present |

For the 2023 Periodic Review of Westminster constituencies, which redrew the constituency map ahead of the 2024 United Kingdom general election, the Boundary Commission for England opted to retain the eleven constituencies in Derbyshire, with minor boundary changes to reflect changes to electoral wards within the county and to bring the electorates within the statutory range. These changes came into effect from the 2024 general election .

The following constituencies were proposed:

Containing electoral wards from Amber Valley

- Amber Valley
- Derbyshire Dales (part)
- Mid Derbyshire (part)

Containing electoral wards from Bolsover

- Bolsover (part)

Containing electoral wards from Chesterfield

- Chesterfield
- North East Derbyshire (part)

Containing electoral wards from Derby

- Derby North
- Derby South
- Mid Derbyshire (part)

Containing electoral wards from Derbyshire Dales

- Derbyshire Dales (part)

Containing electoral wards from Erewash

- Erewash
- Mid Derbyshire (part)

Containing electoral wards from High Peak

- High Peak

Containing electoral wards from North East Derbyshire

- Bolsover (part)
- North East Derbyshire (part)

Containing electoral wards from South Derbyshire

- Derbyshire Dales (part)
- South Derbyshire

== Results history ==
Primary data source: House of Commons research briefing - General election results from 1918 to 2019

=== 2024 ===
The number of votes cast for each political party who fielded candidates in constituencies comprising Derbyshire in the 2024 general election were as follows:

| Party | Votes | % | Change from 2019 | Seats | Change from 2019 |
|---|---|---|---|---|---|
| Labour | 195,568 | 40.1% | ▲5.4% | 11 | ▲9 |
| Conservative | 133,262 | 27.3% | ▼25.0% | 0 | ▼9 |
| Reform UK | 94,292 | 19.3% | ▲16.6% | 0 | Steady |
| Green | 30,348 | 6.2% | ▲3.6% | 0 | Steady |
| Liberal Democrats | 24,897 | 5.1% | ▼2.1% | 0 | Steady |
| Workers | 5,603 | 1.1% | New | 0 | Steady |
| Others | 3,498 | 0.7% | ▲0.2% | 0 | Steady |
| Total | 487,468 | 100.0 | | 11 | |

=== Percentage votes ===
| Election year | 1974 (Feb) | 1974 (Oct) | 1979 | 1983 | 1987 | 1992 | 1997 | 2001 | 2005 | 2010 | 2015 | 2017 | 2019 | 2024 |
|---|---|---|---|---|---|---|---|---|---|---|---|---|---|---|
| Labour | 47.6 | 48.4 | 45.6 | 34.9 | 36.2 | 43.4 | 53.6 | 50.0 | 43.9 | 34.5 | 36.5 | 44.5 | 34.7 | 40.1 |
| Conservative | 37.5 | 33.9 | 40.9 | 41.5 | 43.2 | 41.5 | 29.5 | 31.1 | 30.1 | 36.5 | 39.4 | 48.7 | 52.3 | 27.3 |
| Reform^{1} | - | - | - | - | - | - | - | - | - | - | - | - | 2.7 | 19.1 |
| Green Party | - | - | | - | * | * | * | * | * | 0.6 | 2.8 | 1.2 | 2.6 | 6.2 |
| Liberal Democrat^{2} | 14.8 | 17.5 | 13.0 | 22.6 | 20.5 | 14.7 | 13.8 | 17.5 | 21.4 | 21.6 | 5.6 | 3.8 | 7.2 | 5.1 |
| UKIP | - | - | - | - | - | - | * | * | * | 3.2 | 15.4 | 1.6 | * | - |
| Other | - | 0.2 | 0.5 | 1.0 | 0.1 | 0.4 | 3.1 | 1.4 | 4.6 | 3.7 | 0.2 | 0.2 | 0.5 | 1.8 |

^{1}As the Brexit Party in 2019

^{2}1974 &1979 - Liberal Party; 1983 & 1987 - SDP–Liberal Alliance

* Included in Other

=== Seats ===
| Election year | 1974 (Feb) | 1974 (Oct) | 1979 | 1983 | 1987 | 1992 | 1997 | 2001 | 2005 | 2010 | 2015 | 2017 | 2019 | 2024 |
|---|---|---|---|---|---|---|---|---|---|---|---|---|---|---|
| Labour | 7 | 7 | 6 | 4 | 4 | 4 | 9 | 8 | 8 | 5 | 4 | 5 | 2 | 11 |
| Conservative | 3 | 3 | 4 | 6 | 6 | 6 | 1 | 1 | 1 | 6 | 7 | 6 | 9 | 0 |
| Liberal Democrat^{1} | 0 | 0 | 0 | 0 | 0 | 0 | 0 | 1 | 1 | 0 | 0 | 0 | 0 | 0 |
| Total | 10 | 10 | 10 | 10 | 10 | 10 | 10 | 10 | 10 | 11 | 11 | 11 | 11 | 11 |

^{1}1974 &1979 - Liberal Party; 1983 & 1987 - SDP–Liberal Alliance

=== Maps ===
==== 1885-1910 ====
1885

1886

1892

1895

1900

1906

Jan 1910

Dec 1910

==== 1918-1945 ====
1918

1922

1923

1924

1929

1931

1935

1945

==== 1950-1979 ====
1950

1951

1955

1959

1964

1966

1970

1974 Feb

1974 Oct

1979

==== 1983-present ====
1983

1987

1992

1997

2001

2005

2010

2015

2017

2019

2024

== Historical representation by party ==
A cell marked → (with a different colour background to the preceding cell) indicates that the previous MP continued to sit under a new party name.

=== 1885 to 1918 ===
Conservative Labour Liberal Liberal-Labour Liberal Unionist

| Constituency | 1885 | 1886 | 87 | 91 | 92 | 1892 | 1895 | 1900 | 04 | 1906 | 07 | 08 | 09 | Jan 1910 | 10 | Dec 1910 | 12 | 13 | 14 | 14 | 15 | 16 |
|---|---|---|---|---|---|---|---|---|---|---|---|---|---|---|---|---|---|---|---|---|---|---|
| Chesterfield | Barnes | → | | | | Bayley | | | | Haslam | | | | → | | | | Kenyon | | | | |
| Derby | Roe | | | | | | Bemrose | Roe | | | | | | | | | | | | | | Collins |
| Derby | Vernon-Harcourt | | | | | | Drage | Bell | → | | | | | Thomas | | | | | | | | |
| Derbyshire Mid | Jacoby | | | | | | | | | | | | Hancock | | | | | | | | → | |
| Derbyshire North East | Egerton | Bolton | | | | | | | | | Harvey | | | → | | | | | → | Bowden | | |
| Derbyshire South | Wardle | | | | Broad | | Gretton | | | Raphael | | | | | | | | | | | | |
| Derbyshire West | E. Cavendish | → | | V. Cavendish | | | | | | | | Petty-FitzMaurice | | | | | → | | | | | |
| High Peak | Sidebottom | | | | | | | Partington | | | | | | | | Hill-Wood | | | | | | |
| Ilkeston | Watson | | Foster | | | | | | | | | | | | Seely | | | | | | | |

=== 1918 to 1950 ===
Coalition Liberal (1918-22) / National Liberal (1922-23) Conservative Independent Labour Labour Liberal National Labour

| Constituency | 1918 | 1922 | 1923 | 1924 | 1929 | 31 | 1931 | 33 | 1935 | 36 | 38 | 39 | 42 | 44 | 1945 |
|---|---|---|---|---|---|---|---|---|---|---|---|---|---|---|---|
| Belper | Hancock | | Wragg | | Lees | | Wragg | | | | | | | | Brown |
| Chesterfield | Kenyon | | | | Benson | | Conant | | Benson | | | | | | |
| Clay Cross | Broad | Duncan | | | | | | Henderson | Holland | Ridley | | | | Neal | |
| Derby | Thomas | | | | | → | | | | Noel-Baker | | | | | |
| Derby | Green | Roberts | Raynes | Luce | Raynes | | Reid | | | | | | | | Wilcock |
| Derbyshire North East | Holmes | Lee | | | | | Whyte | | Lee | | | | H. White | | |
| Derbyshire South | Gregory | Lorimer | | Grant | Pole | | Emrys-Evans | | | | | | | | Champion |
| Derbyshire West | C. White | | E. W. Cavendish | | | | | | | | Hunloke | | | C. White jnr | → |
| High Peak | Hill-Wood | | | | Law | | | | | | | Molson | | | |
| Ilkeston | Seely | Oliver | | | | | Flint | | Oliver | | | | | | |

=== 1950 to 1983 ===
Conservative Labour

| Constituency | 1950 | 1951 | 1955 | 1959 | 61 | 62 | 1964 | 1966 | 67 | 1970 | Feb 1974 | Oct 1974 | 1979 |
|---|---|---|---|---|---|---|---|---|---|---|---|---|---|
| Belper | Brown | | | | | | | | | Stewart-Smith | MacFarquhar | | Faith |
| Bolsover | Neal | | | | | | | | | Skinner | | | |
| Chesterfield | Benson | | | | | | Varley | | | | | | |
| Derby North | Wilcock | | | | | MacDermot | | | | Whitehead | | | |
| Derby South | Noel-Baker | | | | | | | | | Johnson | | | |
| Derbyshire North East | White | | | Swain | | | | | | | | | Ellis |
| High Peak | Molson | | | | Walder | | | P. Jackson | | Le Marchant | | | |
| Ilkeston | Oliver | | | | | | Fletcher | | | | | | |
| South East Derbyshire | Champion | | | J. Jackson | | | Park | | | Rost | | | |
| West Derbyshire | Wakefield | | | | | Crawley | | | Scott-Hopkins | | | | Parris |

=== 1983 to present ===
Conservative Independent Labour Liberal Democrats

| Constituency | 1983 | 84 | 86 | 1987 | 1992 | 1997 | 2001 | 2005 | 2010 | 2015 | 2017 | 19 | 2019 | 2024 |
|---|---|---|---|---|---|---|---|---|---|---|---|---|---|---|
| Amber Valley | Oppenheim | | | | | Mallaber | | | Mills | | | | | Farnsworth |
| Bolsover | Skinner | | | | | | | | | | | | Fletcher | Fleet |
| Chesterfield | Varley | Benn | | | | | Holmes | | Perkins | | | | | |
| Derby North | Knight | | | | | Laxton | | | Williamson | Solloway | Williamson | → | Solloway | Atkinson |
| Derby South | Beckett | | | | | | | | | | | | | Shanker |
| Erewash | Rost | | | | Knight | Blackman | | | Lee | Throup | | | | Thompson |
| High Peak | Hawkins | | | | Hendry | Levitt | | | Bingham | | George | | Largan | Pearce |
| North East Derbyshire | Ellis | | | Barnes | | | | Engel | | | Rowley | | | Sandher-Jones |
| South Derbyshire | Currie | | | | | Todd | | | Wheeler | | | | | Niblett |
| W Derbyshire / D'shire Dales ('10) | Parris | | McLoughlin | | | | | | | | | | Dines | Whitby |
| Mid Derbyshire | | | | | | | | | Latham | | | | | Davies |

== See also ==
- List of parliamentary constituencies in the East Midlands (region)
