= 1972 United Kingdom miners' strike =

Industrial action in British coal mining

1972 UK Miners' Strike
- Part of UK miners' strikes
- Date: 9 January 1972 – 28 February 1972
- Location: Nationwide
- Goals: Increased pay for miners
- Methods: Strike action, including flying pickets Civil disobedience
- Result: Pay increase for miners; Battle of Saltley Gate; State of emergency (declared 9 February 1972); Creation of COBR

Parties
National Union of Mineworkers	British Government represented by the National Coal Board

Lead figures
Joe Gormley; Arthur Scargill; Sam Bullough	Edward Heath; Derek Ezra

Casualties and losses
15 injured + 56 arrested (Battle of Saltley Gate); 1 death	17 police officers injured (Battle of Saltley Gate)

A miners' strike took place in the United Kingdom in 1972 as a result of a dispute over pay between the National Union of Mineworkers (NUM) and the Conservative Edward Heath government. Miners' wages had not kept pace with those of other industrial workers since 1960. The strike began on 9 January 1972 and ended on 28 February 1972, when the miners returned to work. The strike was called by the National Executive Committee of the NUM and ended when the miners accepted an improved pay offer in a ballot. It was the first time since 1926 that British miners had been on official strike, but there had been a widespread unofficial strike in 1969.

== Background ==
Competition from cheap oil imports arrived in the late 1950s and the coal industry began to suffer from increasing losses. In 1960 Alf Robens became the chairman of the National Coal Board (NCB), and he introduced a policy concentrating on the most productive pits. During his ten-year tenure, productivity increased by 70%, but with far fewer pits and a much reduced workforce. In 1956, 700,000 men produced 207 million tons of coal; by 1971, fewer than 290,000 workers were producing 133 million tons at 292 collieries. Despite this, the NCB's coal activities were still running at a loss in 1970, putting pressure on the board to hold down pay increases.

The strike occurred because wage negotiations between the NUM and the National Coal Board of the United Kingdom had broken down. In 1960, according to one study, "miners, of whom there were still half a million in 1960, enjoyed historically unprecedented standards of living." According to another study, while the real net income of an average miner in 1957 with a wife and two children was approximately 22% above that of his male counterpart in manufacturing, that fell to approximately 2% below the manufacturing figure in 1969.

During the 1950s, the wages of miners went up from a prewar position of 84th to near the top in the league table of the wages earned by industrial workers, and by 1960, miners' wages were 7.4% above the average pay of workers in manufacturing industries. During the 1960s, however, their pay fell behind other workers, and by 1970 miners were earning 3.1% less than the average worker in manufacturing. By the early 1970s, hundreds of miners had left the industry in search of higher-paying factory jobs.

It was the first time since 1926 that British miners had officially gone on strike (although there had been unofficial strikes, as recently as 1969).

== Strike ==
During a parliamentary debate on the strike in its second week, both Labour and Conservative MPs praised the miners for the forbearance shown during the mass pit closures in the 1960s.

Mine foremen and supervisors, represented by the National Association of Colliery Overmen, Deputies and Shotfirers, did not strike. Following some confrontations with NUM pickets, the National Coal Board adopted a policy of giving leave on full pay to any members of NACODS who faced aggressive intimidation on the way to work.

The strike was characterised by the miners sending flying pickets to other industrial sites to persuade other workers to strike in solidarity, which led to railway workers' refusing to transport coal and power station workers' refusing to handle coal.

Power shortages emerged, and a state of emergency was declared on 9 February, after the weather had turned cold unexpectedly and voltage had been reduced across the entire national grid.

A miner from Hatfield Colliery, near Doncaster, Freddie Matthews, was killed by a lorry while he was picketing on 3 February 1972, and a huge crowd attended his funeral. The non-union lorry driver had mounted the pavement to pass the picket line and struck Matthews in the process. In the aftermath of the death, the picketing in the Doncaster area became more violent, with clashes reported with the NACODS members at Markham Main and Kilnhurst. Tom Swain, Labour MP to Derbyshire North East, remarked, "This could be the start of another Ulster in the Yorkshire coalfield." He threatened to "advocate violence" if an immediate government statement were not made on Matthews's death.

The strike lasted seven weeks, with NUM leaders agreeing to a pay deal on 19 February, which the union claimed to have wrung about 15 extra pay concessions from the Coal Board - over and above the Wilberforce inquiry recommendations. Rank-and-file NUM miners agreed to the pay offer on 25 February, returning to work on 28 February, which officially ended the strike. The pay concessions from the Coal Board came more than a week after the Battle of Saltley Gate, when around 2,000 NUM pickets descended on a coke works in Birmingham and were later joined by thousands of workers from other industries in Birmingham.

The result was characterised as a "victory for violence" by the Conservative Cabinet at the time, in reference to some clashes between miners and police and to some throwing of stones and bottles at lorries trying to pass the pickets.

== Planned strikebreaking force ==
A volunteer force was planned in Scotland to break the miners' pickets during the strike. After release of government papers under the thirty-year rule, it has been revealed that civil servants, police, local authorities and other organisations worked on a secret project to gather hundreds of drivers to supply the country's power stations during the strike.

A Royal Air Force base was to be used for the unit. They were to have between 400 and 600 trucks and drivers. Fire brigades were also contacted to provide off-duty staff and volunteer groups to cater for the coal convoys. The role of the volunteers was to drive in convoys to break the picketlines blocking the supply of coal to the Scottish power plants. The plans were never put into place because the dispute was brought to a close.

== Wilberforce Inquiry ==
An inquiry into miners' pay, chaired by Lord Wilberforce, was set up by the government in February 1972, as the strike was drawing to a close. It reported a week later. It recommended pay increases of between £4.50 and £6 per week. Lord Wilberforce defended the increases, which represented a 27% pay rise, by saying that "we know of no other job in which there is such a combination of danger, health hazard, discomfort in working conditions, social inconvenience and community isolation." Mine workers held out for an extra £1 per week, but eventually settled for a package of "fringe benefits" worth a total of £10 million.

== Creation of COBR ==
The inadequacy of the government's response to the strike provoked re-evaluation of emergency planning. The Cabinet Office Briefing Room (known as COBR) was created to co-ordinate responses to national and regional crises, and is still used to respond to terrorism and other national emergencies by British Government today.

== See also ==
- UK miners' strike (disambiguation)
