= John Houfton =

British colliery owner and politician

J. P. Houfton

Sir John Plowright Houfton (13 December 1857 – 18 November 1929) was a British colliery owner and politician from Mansfield in Nottinghamshire. He sat in the House of Commons from 1922 to 1923.

Houfton first stood for election to Parliament at a by-election in May 1914, when he was the Liberal Party candidate for North East Derbyshire. The vacancy had been caused by the death of the sitting Member of Parliament (MP) William Harvey, who had been a Liberal-Labour candidate when first elected in 1907, and had held the seat with comfortable majorities at both elections in 1910.

The local Liberal Association had sought to run another Liberal-Labour candidate, and were keen that James Martin, a prominent Liberal and President of the Derbyshire Miners Association, would be their candidate. However, Martin, who was keen to stand, was required by the MFGB to pledge support to the Labour Party. The Liberals therefore had to find a different candidate, and the by-election became a three-way contest, with Liberal, Labour and Conservative Party candidates. Houfton lost by a margin to 314 votes (1.9%) to the Conservative candidate George Bowden, with Labour's James Martin polling 22.5% of the votes.

Houfton did not stand again until 1922, when the death of Sir J. D. Rees triggered a by-election in the Nottingham East constituency. He was selected as the Coalition Unionist candidate (i.e. a Conservative standing in the support of the coalition government led by the Liberal David Lloyd George). After a campaign described by The Times newspaper as "strenuous", Houfton won the seat with 52% of the votes, and a majority of 4,973 (25%) over the second-placed Labour Co-operative candidate. He was re-elected at the general election in December 1922, but was defeated at the 1923 general election by the Liberal candidate Norman Birkett.

In August 1926, after the general strike 1926, Houfton was strongly criticised by the Labour MP Frank Varley for negotiating a separate deal with Nottinghamshire and Derbyshire coal miners, without the support of the Miners Federation of Great Britain.

He was knighted in the King's Birthday Honours in 1929, "for political and public services".

Parliament of the United Kingdom
Preceded by Sir John Rees	Member of Parliament for Nottingham East; 1922 – 1923	Succeeded by Norman Birkett
