= 1914 North East Derbyshire by-election =

1914 UK parliamentary by-election

| ← 1910 | 20 May 1914 | 1918 → |

| Candidate | Bowden | Houfton | Martin |
| Party | Unionist | Liberal | Labour |
| Popular vote | 6,469 | 6,155 | 3,669 |
| Percentage | 39.7% | 37.8% | 22.5% |
MP before election
Harvey
Labour
Subsequent MP
Holmes
Liberal

The 1914 North East Derbyshire by-election was a Parliamentary by-election held on 20 May 1914. The constituency returned one Member of Parliament (MP) to the House of Commons of the United Kingdom, elected by the first past the post voting system. About a third of the electorate were directly involved in the mining industry. This was the penultimate by-election to take place before the outbreak of the First World War. It demonstrated the weakness of support for the Labour Party in 1914 when opposed by a Liberal Party candidate.

== Vacancy ==
The by-election was caused by the death of the sitting MP, W. E. Harvey on 28 April 1914 of pneumonia. He had represented the seat since 1907 when he was elected as a Liberal.

== Electoral history ==
Harvey was a senior figure within the Derbyshire Miners Association and also prominent in the Miners Federation of Great Britain. However, in 1909, when the latter body determined to instruct all sponsored miners MPs to take the Labour party whip, Harvey was forced to change his political allegiance. He was re-elected as a Labour candidate in both 1910 general elections when the Liberal party decided not to put up a separate candidate and instead to support Harvey. At the last general election, he was comfortably returned;

Harvey

General election December 1910: North East Derbyshire
| Party | Candidate | Votes | % | ±% |
|---|---|---|---|---|
| Labour | W. E. Harvey | 7,838 | 56.3 | −1.3 |
| Conservative | Josiah Court | 6,088 | 43.7 | +1.3 |
| Majority | | 1,750 | 12.6 | −2.6 |
| Turnout | | 13,926 | 78.7 | −6.8 |
| Labour hold | | Swing | -1.3 | |

== Candidates ==
- As the constituency dominated by the mining industry, the seat had been effectively in the gift of the Derbyshire Miners Association. The Derbyshire Miners executive took the unusual action of appointing their own Election Agent, Bertam Mather rather than looking to use the local Liberal Agent or even a Labour Party agent. Their front-runners for the nomination were their president, James Martin and their Chief Secretary Frank Hall. The appointment of the Labour party supporting Mather suggested that Hall would get the nomination. Hall was prepared to sign the constitution of the Labour party. Martin on the other hand was sympathetic to the Liberal party. He was a member of the local Liberal executive and a sub-agent for the party in his own district.
  Houfton
  When the council of the Derbyshire Miners met they decided to overturn the executive's preference for Hall and voted to nominate Martin. Mather however remained in control as election agent. Mather met with the Labour party who insisted that Martin be made to sign the constitution of the Labour party. Under pressure Martin agreed which meant he subsequently would stand as a Labour party candidate rather than as a Liberal.
- The local Liberal Association had been willing to adopt Martin as their candidate. They had warned that if Martin decided to run for the Labour party rather than as a Liberal, they would adopt their own candidate. To this end they invited John Houfton to be their candidate, though it was thought that he might turn down the Liberal offer, he consented to stand. 58-year-old Houfton, was a native of Chesterfield and owned the Bolsover Colliery Company.
- The Unionists had selected a new candidate in 41-year-old mechanical engineer Major Harland Bowden from Durham. Bowden had been active in the constituency for some time. In April 1912 Bowden had been adopted as the party's prospective candidate for the constituency.

== Campaign ==
The Liberal campaign was dealt an early blow when their Constituency Organiser, Samuel Short, who would have been their By-election Agent, died.

Given that a third of the electorate were directly involved in the mining industry, issues affecting the industry should have dominated the campaign. However the issues surrounding the selection of Martin caused a falling out between the Liberal and Labour parties that cast a shadow over other issues. For the Labour Party, this seemed like an ideal situation to take on the Liberal Party over the issue of miners representation. Their candidate had the official backing of the local miners association and their Liberal opponent was one of bosses the union dealt with.

John Houfton attended the national Liberal Council meeting where he gave a speech about the by-election, in an effort to rally Liberal support from outside the constituency.

On the 14 May nominations closed to confirm that the election would be a three-cornered contest.

The Liberal campaign issued a leaflet entitled 'The Houfton Herald' which presented the issues in national politics in clear and emphatic language.

== Result ==
Electors went to the polls on 20 May 1914. Despite a fall in the Unionist vote share, their candidate gained the seat from the Labour Party, due to a split in the progressive vote;

Bowden

North East Derbyshire by-election, 1914
| Party | Candidate | Votes | % | ±% |
|---|---|---|---|---|
| Conservative | George Robert Harland Bowden | 6,469 | 39.7 | −4.0 |
| Liberal | John Houfton | 6,155 | 37.8 | New |
| Labour | James Martin | 3,669 | 22.5 | −33.8 |
| Majority | | 314 | 1.9 | N/A |
| Turnout | | 16,293 | 84.2 | +5.5 |
| Conservative gain from Labour | | Swing | +14.9 | |

Bowden attributed his victory mainly to his opposition to Irish Home Rule, but also for his opposition to the National Insurance Act. This attribution flew in the face of the fact that 60.3% of the electorate voted for candidates who supported Irish Home Rule. Despite the miners union fielding a Labour Party candidate, it appeared as if the majority of miners decided to vote Liberal. It also indicated that regardless of any local situation, voters were more likely to be influenced by the national situation. The election result confirmed the weakness of the Labour Party as an electoral force when challenged by a Liberal candidate. The result was a humiliation for the Labour Party and a lesson to the Derbyshire Miners Association about party affiliation.

== Aftermath ==
A General Election was due to take place by the end of 1915. By the autumn of 1914, the following candidates had been adopted to contest that election.

- Unionist: George Robert Harland Bowden
- Liberal: John Houfton

Due to the outbreak of war, the election never took place. Bowden found himself estranged from the North East Derbyshire Unionist Association, going so far as to issue libel proceedings against the association's vice-chairman. He continued as the MP, but when he faced re-election in 1918 he was denied endorsement from his party leader Bonar Law and the Coalition Government which contributed to his defeat. The local Liberals replaced Houfton as their candidate and Labour replaced Martin.

General election 1918: North East Derbyshire
| Party | Candidate | Votes | % | ±% |
|---|---|---|---|---|
| Liberal | Stanley Holmes | 6,117 | 31.4 | −6.4 |
| Labour | Frank Lee | 5,560 | 28.6 | +6.1 |
| Ind. Unionist | George Robert Harland Bowden | 5,049 | 25.9 | −13.8 |
| Coalition Unionist | Edward Cavendish | 2,738 | 14.1 | −25.6 |
| Majority | | 557 | 2.8 | N/A |
| Turnout | | 19,464 | 58.0 | −26.2 |
| Liberal gain from Unionist | | Swing | +3.7 | |

The Derbyshire Miners Association continued to find itself at odds with the Miners Federation of Great Britain over matters other than candidate selection and party allegiance. During the General Strike of 1926, the Derbyshire and Nottinghamshire miners brokered a deal with the local colliery owners, led by Houfton. However, the deal was opposed by the MFGB which resulted in a formal split in the local miners unions that lasted into the 1930s.
