= UK miners' strike =

UK miners' strike may refer to:

- 1893 United Kingdom miners' strike
- South Wales miners' strike (1910)
- 1912 United Kingdom national coal strike
- UK miners' strike (1921)
- UK miners' strike (1953)
- 1969 United Kingdom miners' strike, a widespread unofficial strike
- 1972 United Kingdom miners' strike
- UK miners' strike (1974)
- 1984–1985 United Kingdom miners' strike, led by Arthur Scargill of the NUM

== See also ==
- 1926 United Kingdom general strike
