= Battle of Saltley Gate =

1972 British mass picketing in Birmingham

- Date: 3–10 February 1972
- Location: Nechells Place, Nechells, Birmingham; 52.494265°N 1.867888°W
- Type: Mass picketing
- Cause: Industrial dispute
- Outcome: Pickets victory. Closure of the depot for the remainder of the strike
- Injuries: 17 police officers; 15 pickets
- Arrests: 76
- Nechells shown within the West Midlands

The Battle of Saltley Gate was the mass picketing of a fuel storage depot in Birmingham, England, in February 1972 during a national miners' strike. When the strike began on 9 January 1972, it was generally considered that the miners "could not possibly win." Woodrow Wyatt, writing in the Daily Mirror, said: "Rarely have strikers advanced to the barricades with less enthusiasm or hope of success ... The miners have more stacked against them than the Light Brigade in their famous charge." The picketing of the fuel depot – out of which tens of thousands of tons of coke fuel were being distributed nationwide – became a pivotal, and symbolic, event during the strike. Forcing its closure secured victory for the National Union of Mineworkers (NUM).

Having closed every coal mine in the country, the miners' union sought to leverage its position by 'freezing' existing stockpiles of fuel in place, preventing them from being transported to the power stations, businesses and heavy industries that depended on them. By the beginning of February, the tactic was becoming effective and the Central Electricity Generating Board warned that power outages were imminent. The "last large accessible" stockpile of solid fuel in the country was held by a West Midlands Gas Board (WMGB) coke plant in Birmingham, where up to 700 vehicles were collecting fuel each day for supply to industry. WMGB argued that as they employed no miners they were not a party to the dispute and so should be allowed to continue supplying their customers. When news of mile-long queues of lorries waiting to collect fuel was published on 3 February in the Birmingham Mail, a small group of miners from nearby Staffordshire set up a picket line at the works.

Their numbers proved ineffectual at persuading the lorry drivers to turn back, and Birmingham City Police sent hundreds of officers to ensure the depot gates were kept open. Within days, the Staffordshire pickets' request for assistance was answered by several thousand miners from South Yorkshire and South Wales. By 10 February, the number of pickets and protesters, bolstered by the arrival of unionised workers from other Birmingham industries, had reached upwards of 15,000, and Sir Derrick Capper, the chief constable of Birmingham City Police, ordered the depot to close its gates "in the interests of public safety."

The picketing and closure of the depot has been called "the miners' Agincourt", and brought one of its architects, Arthur Scargill – until then, "an obscure regional union official" – to national prominence as "a tribune of the working classes... hailed by the British magazine Harper's & Queen as one of Britain's leaders of the future."

== Background ==
The national strike by coal miners began on 9 January 1972. It was the first official national miners' strike since the General Strike in 1926. The dispute arose from pay negotiations – the miners, led by Joe Gormley, initially asked for pay rises of between 35–47%, while the National Coal Board (NCB), under Derek Ezra, was only prepared to offer 7.4%. All 289 coal mines in the country ceased production. At the beginning of the strike, it was estimated that there were sufficient stockpiles of fuel to supply national requirements for about 8 weeks. However, the stockpiles were unevenly distributed around the country and fuel was "not necessarily at the places where it was needed." Within days of the strike commencing, the Miners' International Federation and the International Transport Workers' Federation had asked their members to block any strike-breaking movements of coal and coke into and across Britain, and the Trades Union Congress (TUC) was asked to convene a meeting of transport unions to ensure that stockpiles were not transported out of collieries. The National Union of Railwaymen instructed its members not to cross picket lines, not to operate trains carrying fuel and "not to do anything that could be construed as strike-breaking". On 11 January, the Amalgamated Union of Engineering Workers instructed its members to cease working at collieries, and the Associated Society of Locomotive Engineers and Firemen instructed its members not to operate trains carrying fuel.

With the collieries successfully closed, the miners were now able to focus their efforts on picketing coal-fired power stations, docks and fuel storage depots. Dockworkers were backing the miners by refusing to unload ships carrying coal, and vessels carrying coal destined for power stations were turned away at Cardiff and Middlesbrough docks in the first week of the strike. Schools and private businesses, which due to their limited storage capacities tended not to stockpile large amounts of fuel, also began to close within the first week, unable to provide heating. Under guidelines agreed between the NUM, the NCB and the government, dispensation was given to allow fuel to be transported to "priority consumers" – hospitals, nursing homes for the elderly, and orphanages. Schools were added to the list on 12 January.

On 7 February, four weeks into the strike, the effective blockade placed on fuel stockpiles led to the CEGB cutting the voltage across the National Grid and warning of impending power outages. The problem of unevenly distributed stockpiles had been compounded by the refusal of transport workers carrying the "lighting-up" oil (used to ignite damp pulverised coal) and hydrogen (used to cool generators) to cross picket lines, and at least three power stations which still held reserves of coal had already shut down. A spokesman for the CEGB declared: "We are in a state of siege".

=== Death of Fred Matthews ===
The picketing was largely without incident and relations between pickets and police were good. Reginald Maudling, the Home Secretary, accepted that, despite exceptional instances of disorder, "the bulk of the picketing that has taken place has certainly been peaceful." Where police and pickets did clash, the confrontations were characterised as "scuffles", amounting to "spirited pushing and shoving." However, tension between pickets and strike-breaking lorry drivers rose on 3 February when Fred Matthews, a miner from the Doncaster area, was struck and killed by a lorry speeding out of Keadby Power Station, near Scunthorpe, North Lincolnshire. Matthews was one of 50 miners manning the picket line. The lorry mounted the pavement, "scattering pickets", and failed to stop after hitting Matthews. Police officers on duty at the picket line had to use cars belonging to miners to pursue the lorry, and brought it to a halt around a mile from the scene of the incident.

As news of Matthews' death began to spread that evening, Tom Swain, the MP for Derbyshire North East, demanded that the Home Secretary return to Parliament immediately to make a statement. Swain warned: "If there is not an immediate statement by the minister I will go back to my constituency tonight and advocate violence, violence, violence." Members of print union the National Society of Operative Printers and Assistants 'downed tools' and halted production of national newspapers for an hour in protest at Matthews' death. When the Home Secretary returned to Parliament late that night to address the House, Shirley Williams, the Shadow Home Secretary, demanded to know what instructions were being given to strike-breaking drivers and urged the government to intervene in the dispute between the miners and the NCB "before it was too late."

== Nechells gas works ==
Although the confrontation has come to be known as the "Battle of Saltley Gate", the picketed depot was located in the adjacent ward of Nechells. Robert Kellaway said: "Many commentators have discussed the mythology surrounding the "Battle of Saltley Gate" yet its most obvious myth – its name – has often been overlooked. The confrontation actually took place at the gate for Nechells gas works. The Saltley gas works and its "gates" were on the other side of the Saltley Viaduct adjacent to the Nechells works. As local trade unionist Bill Shreeve declared, "The press and the media kept insisting on calling it Saltley Gate and that's gone down in the history books."" Don Perrygrove, a local union official, said: "Next to Saltley gas works there's also a locality where there used to be a tollgate, and that is called "Saltley Gate" and when people were trying to close the gas works... they assumed that it was one and the same."

Nechells gas works produced coke as a by-product from the manufacture of coal gas. It was owned and operated by the West Midlands Gas Board. Prior to the strike, the coke was sold largely to schools and hospitals, and a former manager of the depot described its normal operations as "three lorries a day at most". After the strike was announced, demand increased sharply and the depot began receiving up to 400 vehicles per day. By February, around 30,000 tons of coke had been collected and the stockpile was estimated to hold 100,000 tons. The number of collections had increased to around 700 per day, and traffic around the depot was being disrupted by the queues, up to a mile long, of lorries waiting to get in.

== Impact ==
The success of the NUM pickets at Saltley Gate was promoted by Arthur Scargill and many of his supporters as the decisive victory in the 1972 strike and evidence of the effectiveness of solidarity strikes and mass picketing. However, Frank Walters has argued that victory was likely even without the success at Saltley Gate, and Paul Routledge has argued that, in the long-term, the actions were counter-productive by prompting the Conservative Party to adopt a more adversarial attitude towards strikes. The Battle of Orgreave was the state's response in the 1984 miners' strike to mass picketing.

== In popular culture ==
The events are portrayed from the point of view of an AUEW member in Birmingham in the song Close the Gates by Banner Theatre.

== See also ==
- Battle of Orgreave
- 1984–1985 United Kingdom miners' strike
