= George Bowden =

George Bowden may refer to:

- George E. Bowden (1852–1908), U.S. Representative from Virginia
- George Bowden (Australian politician) (1888–1962), Australian soldier and politician
- Harland Bowden (George Robert Harland Bowden, 1873–1927), British MP for North East Derbyshire, 1914–1918
