= 1922 Nottingham East by-election =

UK Parliamentary by-election

The 1922 Nottingham East by-election was held on 29 June 1922. The by-election was held due to the death of the incumbent Coalition Conservative MP, John David Rees. It was won by the Coalition Conservative candidate John Houfton.

== Candidates ==
The local Liberal Association, who had not contested the previous general election, at first selected local journalist Cecil Roberts to contest the seat. However, he gave way for journalist Thomas George Graham. At the previous general election in 1918 Graham had contested Blaydon against a Liberal MP who had the support of the Coalition Government. Graham came third, polling only 5% of the vote.

== Result ==
Nottingham East by-election, 1922
Party		Candidate	Votes	%	±%
C	Unionist	John Houfton	10,404	52.3	−13.4
	Labour Co-op	A.H. Jones	5,431	27.3	+7.9
	Liberal	Thomas George Graham	4,065	20.4	New
Majority			4,973	25.0	−21.3
Turnout			19,900	66.3	+16.8
	Unionist hold		Swing	-10.6	
C indicates candidate endorsed by the coalition government.

== Aftermath ==
Graham did not contest Nottingham East at the general election 5 months later. He instead returned to the north east to contest Wallsend. He was no more fortunate, finishing third out of four, polling 10%. The Liberals were to win Nottingham East at the 1923 general election.
