= 1969 United Kingdom miners' strike =

Unofficial strike in October 1969

An unofficial miners' strike took place in the United Kingdom in 1969, involving 140 of the 307 collieries owned by the National Coal Board, including all collieries in the Yorkshire area. The strike began on 13 October 1969 and lasted for roughly two weeks, with some pits returning to work before others. The NCB lost £15 million and 2.5 million tonnes of coal as a result of the strike.

== Context ==
At the time of the strike, wage negotiations were underway between the NCB and the National Union of Mineworkers. Although that was not the cause of the dispute, it became essential to the settlement of the dispute. During the 1960s employment in coal mining had fallen by almost 400,000 with little resistance from the NUM leadership, but the left wing of the union was becoming stronger and drawing strength from the students' protests. When miners staged a protest in London to support their wage claim, many Londoners were surprised that there were still coal mines operating in Britain. The NUM leadership of Sidney Ford was regarded by many within the union as having been too passive and accommodating of a Labour government.

== Cause ==
The cause was the hours of work for surface workers, who were often older mineworkers who were no longer capable of working underground. Wages were lower, and working hours were longer for surface work than for underground work. The annual conference of the NUM had voted in July 1968 to demand the surface workers' hours be lowered to seven-and-three-quarters, but the union's executive had not acted upon the vote.

== Sequence of events ==
On 11 October, Arthur Scargill led a group of Yorkshire mineworkers in pushing for action at the Yorkshire NUM's area council. The president of the Yorkshire NUM, Sam Bullogh, was unwell at the time and ruled Scargill "out of order". The area council's delegates responded by voting Bullogh out of the chair and voted for a strike by a margin of 85 votes to 3.

Within 48 hours, all 70,000 mineworkers in Yorkshire were on strike. In other militant coalfields, such as Kent, South Wales and Scotland, walkouts followed shortly afterwards. The coalfields of Derbyshire and Nottinghamshire were more conservative and became targeted by pickets from Yorkshire when they did not respond to the strike call. That has been identified as the first widespread use of flying pickets.

Most of north Derbyshire was picketed out, but only five pits in Nottinghamshire were picketed out by the week ending on 24 October 1969. Nottinghamshire NUM officials complained of "hooliganism" from the flying pickets, and called for a police presence.

The clashes were later highlighted as a foreboding of the aggressive picketing during the 1984–5 strike.

Many of those on unofficial strike began to make demands for change in the leadership of the NUM, and they set up strike committees to bypass the official union bodies. The union had avoided making demands of Labour governments since the Second World War, and it had been largely inactive during a period of widespread pit closures under the first Wilson government.

A group of housewives in Wakefield, West Riding of Yorkshire, refused to undertake any housework until their husbands returned to work.

The Chairman of the NCB, former Labour MP Alf Robens, proposed to resolve the dispute by conceding the wage claim of 27 shillings and 6 pence (£1.375) per week. Vic Feather, the TUC general secretary, negotiated a return to work on the basis of the salary increase proposed by Robens but with the issue of working hours for surface workers unchanged pending future negotiations.

The NUM held a ballot that treated the wage offer and the deferment of the surface workers' issues as one package to be accepted: mineworkers were not given the option to accept the former but reject the latter. The package was accepted by 237,462 votes to 41,322. The Yorkshire Area of the NUM recommended that the offer be rejected, but Yorkshire mineworkers voted to accept by 37,597 (72.3%) to 14,373 (27.6%).

The Wilberforce Inquiry, which followed an official strike in 1972, concluded that the mineworkers in the late 1960s had been overworked and underpaid under the National Power Loading Agreement of the first Wilson government.

== Impact on NUM ==
The strike was seen by some as a turning point after which the NUM took a more militant approach, especially in the Yorkshire area, where many of the officials were voted out and replaced with left-wingers. In his study of the Yorkshire NUM, Andrew Taylor gives five reasons why the Yorkshire area aligned itself with the militant areas of Kent, Scotland and South Wales during the 1960s:

1. As a large region, Yorkshire had always had some militant areas (e.g. around Doncaster) but also areas that were opposed to militancy. The militant elements became more prominent in the late 1960s when the moderate leadership of the NUM had failed to win concessions from the first Wilson government.
2. Pit closures in Yorkshire had been rare before the mid-1960s. They had a large psychological impact once they began.
3. The National Coal Board reorganised its regions in the year 1966–7 so that Yorkshire was split into four administrative areas. As the NUM kept the structure of one area for Yorkshire, a panel system developed for negotiation with the NCB, which gave greater opportunities for militant pits in certain districts to go against the NUM leadership.
4. Under the National Power Loading Agreement, wages no longer varied from colliery to colliery so mineworkers were more likely to find a common cause to strike when there was discontent over pay.
5. The area leaders in Yorkshire misjudged the mood of the mineworkers and failed to anticipate the disillusionment with the national leadership.

The action led to discussions on the NUM's threshold of a two-thirds majority for a national strike. Many argued that it was too high and that the 1969 action could have been handled better otherwise. There were further unofficial strikes in the militant collieries in 1970 after a ballot for national action achieved a majority for action of 55%, which was too low for the strike to be authorised. In 1971, the threshold for a majority for strike action was reduced to 55%.

The strike was the first time that Scargill gained attention beyond his activities at Woolley Colliery, where he had previously organised a local strike in spring 1960 over the day that union meetings were held. He nicknamed the strike "the October revolution" (referencing the Soviet historical event of the same name) and said in 1975, "'69 was responsible for producing all the victories that were to come".

Scargill went on to play a key role in the 1972 strike, especially through organisation of the Battle of Saltley Gate, and to lead the union through the 1984–5 strike.
