= 1942 North East Derbyshire by-election =

UK parliamentary by-election

The 1942 North East Derbyshire by-election was a by-election held for the British House of Commons constituency of North East Derbyshire on 2 February 1942. The seat had become vacant on the death in December 1941 of the Labour Member of Parliament Frank Lee.

The Labour candidate, Henry White, was returned unopposed. He represented the constituency until he retired from the House of Commons at the 1959 general election.

== See also ==
- North East Derbyshire (UK Parliament constituency)
- List of United Kingdom by-elections
