= 1907 North East Derbyshire by-election =

UK Parliamentary by-election

Thomas Bolton

The 1907 North East Derbyshire by-election was held on 30 January 1907. The by-election was held due to the death of the incumbent Liberal MP, Thomas Bolton. It was won by the Lib-Lab candidate W. E. Harvey.

North East Derbyshire by-election, 1907 Electorate 16,232
| Party | Candidate | Votes | % | ±% |
|---|---|---|---|---|
| Lib-Lab | W. E. Harvey | 6,644 | 52.9 | −3.6 |
| Liberal Unionist | Josiah Court | 5,915 | 47.1 | +3.6 |
| Majority | | 729 | 5.8 | −7.2 |
| Turnout | | 12,559 | 77.4 | −7.9 |
| Liberal hold | | Swing | -3.6 | |
