= Sir John Rees, 1st Baronet =

British politician (1854-1922)

Member of Parliament for Montgomery
- In office 1906–1910

Member of Parliament for Nottingham East
- In office 1912–1922

Personal details
- Born: 16 December 1854
- Died: 2 June 1922 (aged 67)

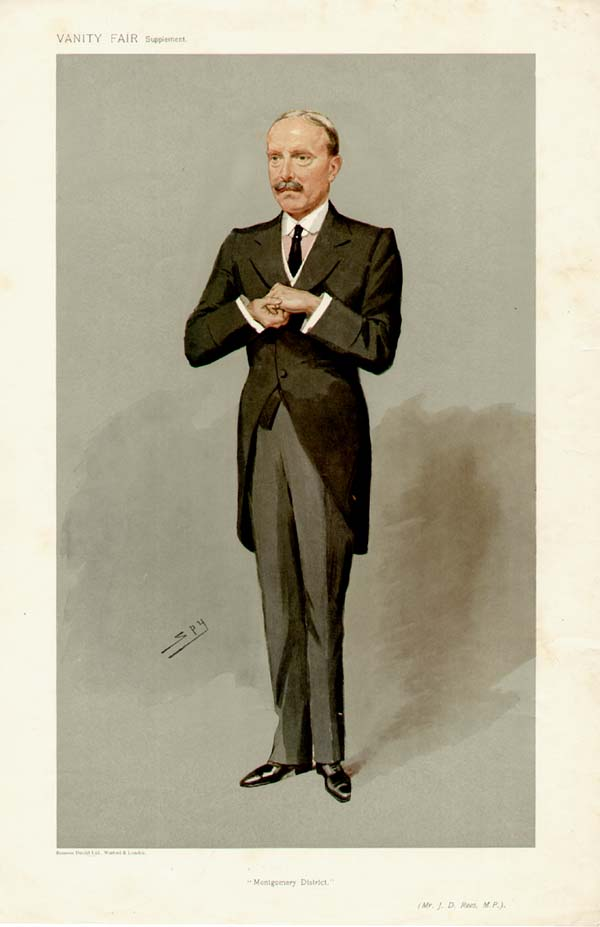
"Montgomery District" Rees as caricatured by Spy (Leslie Ward) in Vanity Fair, February 1907

Sir John David Rees, 1st Baronet, KCIE, CVO (16 December 1854 – 2 June 1922) was a colonial administrator in British India, and subsequently a Member of Parliament at Westminster.

== Biography ==
He was educated at Cheltenham College and joined the Indian Civil Service in 1875. He served mostly in the south of India where he was Under-Secretary in the Madras Government, and later the British Resident in Travancore and Cochin. He also served as an Additional Member of the Governor-General's Council in the 1890s.

In 1901, Rees retired from the Civil Service. He was an active proponent of the Raj and wrote a number of books on British India. The Real India, first published in 1908, went through a number of editions. In 1902, he had even contributed a number of columns to the Times Literary Supplement on Indian matters.

== Parliament ==
He served two terms as Member of Parliament (MP): from 1906 to 1910 as the Liberal MP for Montgomery constituency, and from 1912 to 1922 as the Unionist MP for Nottingham East.

He also unsuccessfully contested Kilmarnock Burghs at a by-election in 1911.

== Family ==
He married Mary Catherine Dormer in 1891, and was created a baronet on 8 May 1919. Lady Rees was a correspondent of George Orwell.

Their daughter Rosemary Rees, later Lady du Cros (1901–1994) was an aviator and one of the first eight female pilots appointed to the Air Transport Auxiliary during the Second World War. She was also a qualified flight instructor and was one of the few pilots to receive an MBE for her work in this field.

He was succeeded in the baronetcy by his son, Richard Rees, the inspiration for Ravelston in Orwell's Keep The Aspidistra Flying.

== Selected works ==
- Tours in India
- The Mahommedans
- The Real India
- Modern India
- Current Political Problems

== Arms ==
Coat of arms of Sir John Rees, 1st Baronet
Crest A demi-lion rampant erased Azure charged on the shoulder with a plate thereon a cross Gules. Escutcheon Argent a chevron Sable between three ravens Proper on a chief of the second between two plates each charged with a cross Gules a like plate charged with a demi-lion rampant erased Azure. Motto Deus Alit Eos (God Nourishes Them)

Parliament of the United Kingdom
Preceded by Edward Pryce-Jones	Member of Parliament for Montgomery; 1906 – December 1910	Succeeded by Edward Pryce-Jones
Preceded by James Morrison	Member of Parliament for Nottingham East; 1912–1922	Succeeded by John Houfton
Baronetage of the United Kingdom
New creation	Baronet (of Aylward's Chase); 1919–1922	Succeeded by Richard Rees
