= Rees baronets =

Extinct baronetcy in the Baronetage of the United Kingdom

The Rees Baronetcy, of Aylwards Chase in the County of Middlesex, was a title in the Baronetage of the United Kingdom. It was created on 8 May 1919 for Sir J. D. Rees, in honour of parliamentary and public services. He was succeeded by his son, the second Baronet. He was a diplomat, writer and painter. The title became extinct on his death in 1970.

== Rees baronets, of Aylwards Chase (1919) ==
- Sir John David Rees, 1st Baronet (1854–1922)
- Sir Richard Lodowick Edward Montagu Rees, 2nd Baronet (1900–1970)

== Arms ==
Coat of arms of Rees baronets
Crest A demi-lion rampant erased Azure charged on the shoulder with a plate thereon a cross Gules. Escutcheon Argent a chevron Sable between three ravens Proper on a chief of the second between two plates each charged with a cross Gules a like plate charged with a demi-lion rampant erased Azure. Motto Deus Alit Eos (God Nourishes Them)
