= Thomas Bolton (politician) =

British politician

Thomas Bolton

Thomas Dolling Bolton (c.1841 (Note: Primary sources suggest he was born in summer 1843.) – 16 December 1906), was a British Liberal Party politician.

== Family ==
He was a son of James Thomas Bolton, of Solihull, Warwickshire and Mary Ratcliffe, daughter of the Rev. William Boughey Dolling.

== Career ==
He was a solicitor, admitted in 1866. He was a member of Windsor Town Council. He was a company director of the Rhymney Coal and Iron Company. He served as a Justice of the Peace in Herefordshire. He sat as Liberal MP for Derbyshire North East from the 1886 General Election until his death in December 1906. He was first elected at the 1886 General Election, holding a seat that had been won by a Liberal when it was created in 1885.

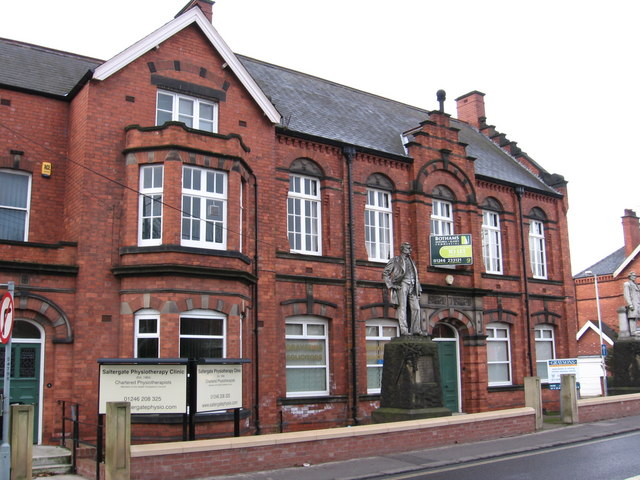
Former Derbyshire Miners' Association offices in Chesterfield

Derbyshire North East was a constituency that was dominated by the mining industry. He developed a good working relationship with the Derbyshire Miners Association and arranged, free of charge, for the conveyance of the land for the miners association new building in 1891, and advised them to register under the Trade Union Act 1871 introduced by Gladstone's Liberal Government, so that they could legally hold the property.

In April, 1897, he presented to Parliament petitions in favour of the Eight Hours' Bill from the miners of the North-East Derbyshire division. This petition argued for a maximum working day.

As a supporter of the temperance movement, he was a formidable opponent of the Conservative Government's Licensing Bill.

== Notes ==
Parliament of the United Kingdom
Preceded by Francis Egerton	Member of Parliament for Derbyshire North-East; 1886 – December 1906	Succeeded by William Edwin Harvey
