= Harry Barnes (Labour politician) =

British Labour politician (1936–2026)

Member of Parliament for North East Derbyshire
- In office 11 June 1987 – 11 April 2005
- Preceded by: Raymond Ellis
- Succeeded by: Natascha Engel

Personal details
- Born: 22 July 1936 Easington, County Durham, England
- Died: 16 February 2026 (aged 89)
- Party: Labour
- Education: Ruskin College; University of Hull

Harold Barnes (22 July 1936 – 16 February 2026) was an English politician who was the Labour Party Member of Parliament for North East Derbyshire from 1987 to 2005.

== Early life and career ==
Born in Easington, County Durham, Barnes was educated at Ruskin College in Oxford and the University of Hull. He was elected to Parliament in the 1987 election. Barnes stood down at the May 2005 general election, and was succeeded by Natascha Engel.

=== Political positions ===
Barnes was considered to be on the left of the party, and as a member of the Socialist Campaign Group (SCG) he voted against Tony Blair's leadership on a number of issues. However, unlike other members of the SCG he was not an advocate of the Troops Out Movement (from Northern Ireland). When the group split over NATO intervention in Kosovo in 1999, he supported intervention, which was the position of the government.

Before entering parliament, Barnes was a member of the Independent Labour Party's successor organisation, Independent Labour Publications. As an MP, he joined a supporters group, Friends of the ILP.

== Death ==
Barnes died from cancer on 16 February 2026, at the age of 89.

Parliament of the United Kingdom
Preceded by Raymond Ellis	Member of Parliament for North East Derbyshire; 1987–2005	Succeeded by Natascha Engel
