= Jardine Whyte =

Jardine Bell Whyte (5 March 1880 – 8 July 1954) was a British consulting engineer and naval architect, who later served a single term in Parliament as a Conservative. He was generally loyal to the National Government but pressed for stronger defence and the use of modern engineering to help society.

== Engineering training ==
Whyte was from a Scottish family; his father Robert lived at Lauchope House in Lanarkshire and in Glasgow. He went to the Royal High School in Edinburgh, and then the University of Edinburgh where he studied engineering. He obtained membership of the Institution of Mechanical Engineers and went into business as an engineer. From 1907 he worked as a consulting engineer and Naval Architect in San Francisco.

== War service ==
After the outbreak of the First World War, Whyte returned to Britain and joined the war effort. He became Chief Engineer on board HM Transport Nile in 1915, then in 1917 he was personal assistant to Sir William Thomson, Director of Auxiliary Ships' Engines at the Admiralty. At the end of 1917 he became Assistant Director and Manager for the Ministry of Shipping in the United States and Canada; the next year, he was promoted to be Chief Technical Adviser and Director in the same office. He returned to Britain in 1921 when the Ministry was abolished. In November 1923 he married Maisie Dreicer, widow of Michael Dreicer, at St Columba's Church, Pont Street. His wife, who was from a New York City family but became prominent in British society: she gave a private dance for Claudia Crichton Stuart, daughter of Lord Ninian Crichton-Stuart. Whyte gained experience lecturing on publicity campaigns, often in the United States.

== 1931 election ==
After a general election was called in October 1931, Whyte was chosen at the last minute as the Conservative candidate for North East Derbyshire; however the constituency was reckoned to be safely held by the Labour Party and the Conservatives were not expected to fight it. On election day, Whyte prevailed over the sitting Labour MP Frank Lee with a majority of 1,334 votes (a candidate from Sir Oswald Mosley's New Party lost his deposit).

== Parliament ==
Whyte described himself as a 'National Conservative' MP. He pressed for the legalisation of sweepstakes to fund voluntary hospitals. He took more than a year to make his maiden speech which defended the 1923 settlement of war debts to the United States as the best obtainable. When a motion from Government members supported the abolition of aerial bombardment without any reservation, Whyte joined with other Conservative MPs in signing a motion urging its retention 'for police purposes'. In December 1933 Whyte welcomed the announcement that the Government would assist in the construction of the Cunard Line's 'Hull no. 534' and called for more help for British shipping firms to enable a full revival of British shipbuilding.

Late in 1934 Whyte pressed the Air Ministry to guarantee that the air services were sufficient to protect the Navy against air attacks. He also joined with other Conservative MPs in putting down an amendment to the Loyal Address after the King's Speech which called for the construction of elevated roadways in major cities to relieve road congestion. Whyte decided not to seek re-election at the 1935 general election.

== Later life ==
Whyte set up his own company, Jardine Whyte & Co Ltd, but it was wound up in 1940. Whyte died in Edinburgh in 1954.

Parliament of the United Kingdom
Preceded by Frank Lee	Member of Parliament for North East Derbyshire; 1931 – 1935	Succeeded by Frank Lee
