= Picketing =

Form of protest, usually labor action

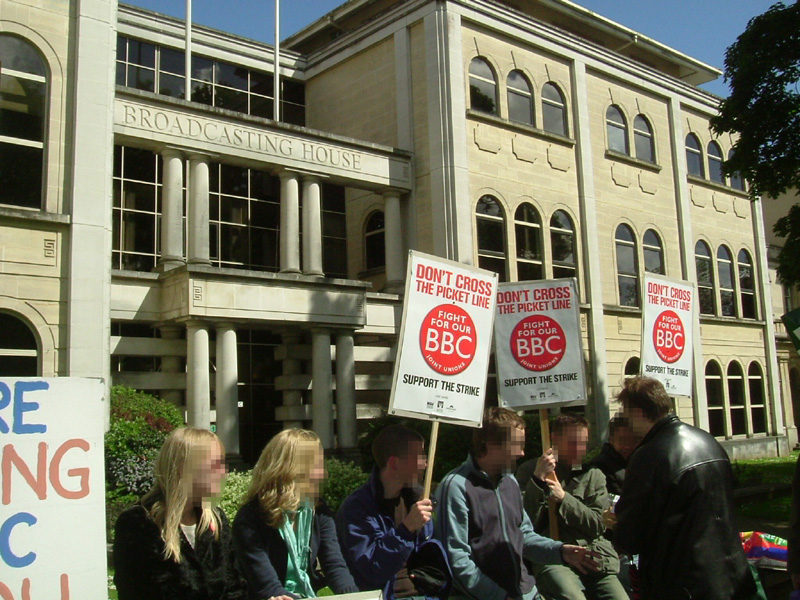
Employees of the BBC form a picket line during a strike in May 2005.

Picketing is a form of protest in which people (called pickets or picketers) congregate outside a place of work or location where an event is taking place. Often, this is done in an attempt to dissuade others from going in ("crossing the picket line"), but it can also be done to draw public attention to a cause. Picketers normally endeavor to be nonviolent. It can have a number of aims but is generally to put pressure on the party targeted to meet particular demands or cease operations. This pressure is achieved by harming the business through loss of customers and negative publicity, or by discouraging or preventing workers or customers from entering the site and thereby preventing the business from operating normally.

Picketing is a common tactic used by trade unions during strikes, who will try to prevent dissident members of the union, members of other unions and non-unionised workers from working. Those who cross the picket line and work despite the strike are known pejoratively as scabs.

== Types of picket ==
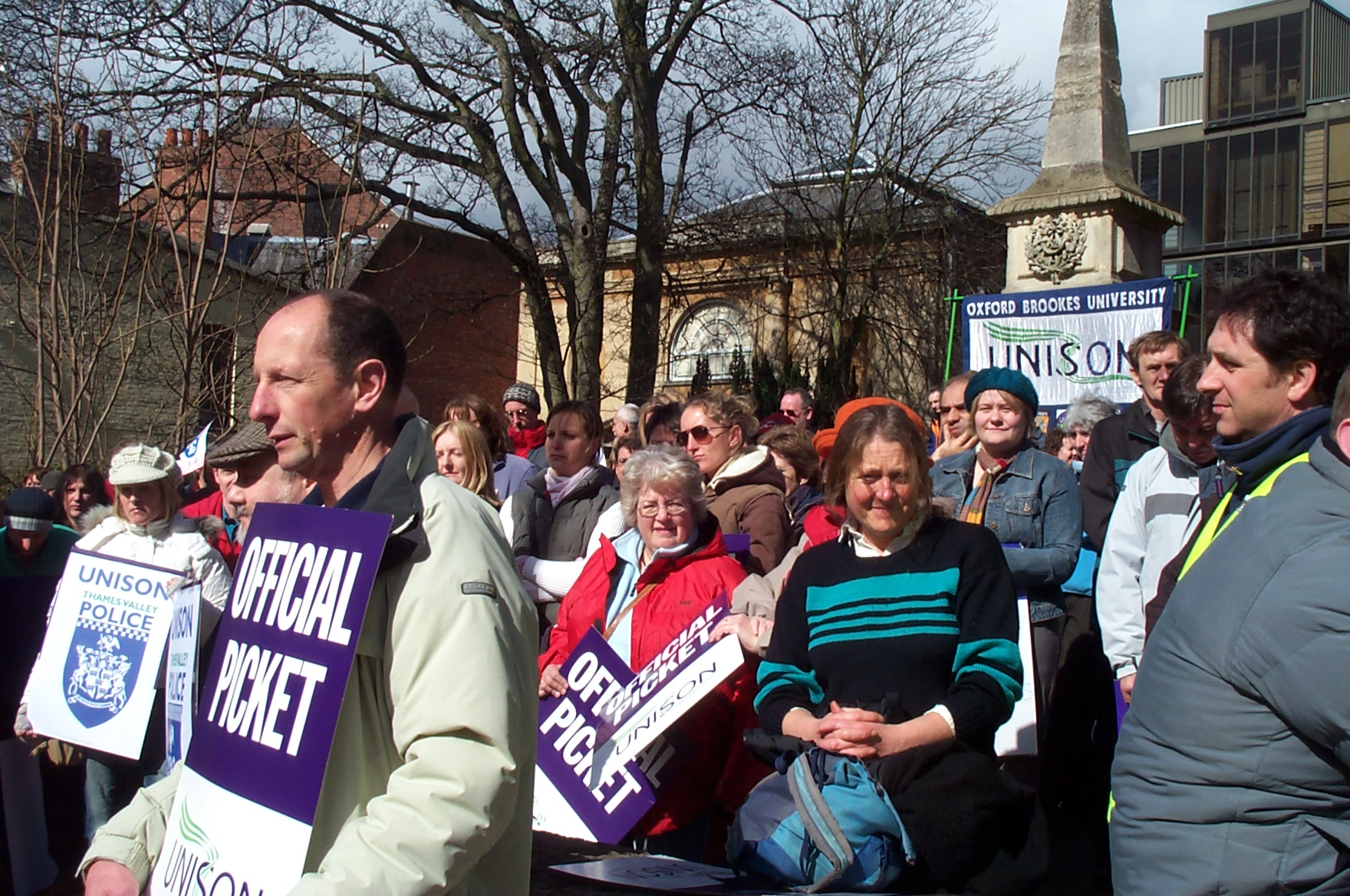
A rally of the trade union UNISON in Oxford during a strike on March 28, 2006, with members carrying picket signs

Informational picketing is the legal name given to awareness-raising picketing. Per Merriam-Webster's Dictionary of Law, it entails picketing by a group, typically a labour or trade union, which inform the public about a cause of its concern. In almost all cases this is a disliked policy or practice of the business or organisation. It is a popular picketing technique for nurses to use outside of healthcare facilities. For example, on April 5, 2006, nurses of the UMass Memorial Medical Center (UMMHC) took part in two separate such events to protect the quality of their nursing program. Informational picketing was used to gain public support and promote further bargaining with management. It may also be a spur or auxiliary to a petition to government to seek regulatory intervention, reliefs, dispensations or funds.

A mass picket is an attempt to bring as many people as possible to a picket line to demonstrate support for the cause. It is primarily used when only one workplace is being picketed or for a symbolically or practically important workplace. Due to the numbers involved, and depending on behaviors, it may turn into an unlawful blockade such as a right of way obstruction, or aggravated trespass (denial of access).

Secondary picketing is of any external entity economically connected to the main business subject to the workers' action. Thus it includes picketing against suppliers on which the picketed business relies, retailers who sell its products, physical premises with shared management or majority shareholders (sister/allied premises) and homes of any of the latter persons. For example, at the Battle of Saltley Gate in 1972 in England, striking miners picketed a coke works in Birmingham and were later joined by thousands of workers from industries locally. In most jurisdictions, secondary pickets lack all or many of the civil law protections given to primary pickets.

Secondary picketing has been illegal (in the sense that, unlike lawful picketing, it may give rise to a cause of action in tort) in the United Kingdom since the coming into force of section 17 of the Employment Act 1980, a law tabled and passed by the Conservative government of Margaret Thatcher. Labour sought repeal of this via the party's 1987 manifesto; the party called for a debate on such issues in the next (1992) manifesto; and dropped this position under Tony Blair and later leaders' manifestos from 1997 onwards.

Another tactic is to organise highly mobile pickets, who can turn up at any of a business's locations quickly. These flying pickets are particularly effective against multi-facility businesses that could otherwise pursue legal prior restraint and shift operations among facilities if the locations were known with certainty ahead of time. The first highly strategic use of such may have been the example of the 1969 miners' strike in Britain. Flying pickets are usually not legal in the United Kingdom; workers must only picket at their workplace.

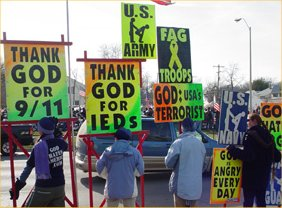
Picketing by the Westboro Baptist Church in Topeka, Kansas, with the group's signature multi-colored picket signs

Picketing can interweave with boycotting campaigns by pressure groups across the political and moral spectrum. In particular, religious groups such as the Westboro Baptist Church seek to picket local store fronts and events they consider sinful. Non-employee protesters are third parties to the business so counter-actions may lie in the courts (or out-of-court remedies) for disruption of trade, unlawful protest, defamation, and certain types of illegal advertising, trespass and nuisance, against which freedom of expression, of religion and/or a public interest defence vie. Different jurisdictions weigh these two competing sets of rights differently. The global result is that the rules and outcomes are fact-sensitive (rest closely on the actions, form, subject-matter, duration and behaviors) and law-sensitive (divergently regulated or governed by case law).

== Disruptive picketing ==
Disruptive picketing covers a wide variety of pickets:

- Obstructive picketing which significantly physically narrows or stalls the flow of persons, goods or services into and out of the business.
- Public order or highway offence picketing which due to behaviors, third-party supporters, or overspill meets with or is entitled to be met with police or local authority enforcement measures to limit its activities or street-side support.
- Criminally violent or menacing picketing: use of force (battery and/or criminal damage), or reasonably perceptible and real threats of such (assault), to injure or sufficiently intimidate persons.
  - At several pickets at the height of the UK miners' strike (1984–85), picketers pelted strikebreakers with stones, paint and brake fluid. Police arrested many of these picketers for offences against the person.
- Vexatious picketing which due to very high frequency causes severe loss of economic activity and/or reputation.

Obstructive picketing may be contrasted with non-obstructive picketing, in which the impact on the business or organization is likely to be limited to the presence nearby of a group of people close in number to the number of strikers, who have an informational picketing line, assembly or rally. It is possible, but rarely allowed in labour law globally, to have an informational picket in a public place of a business which has no simultaneous strike – i.e., a protest of workers outside of their shifts. In some sectors, the immediate financial impact of a non-obstructive picket could be negligible, and the longer-term impacts could include a human resources policy or public-facing policy enhancement and a consumer relations uplift.

== Legality ==
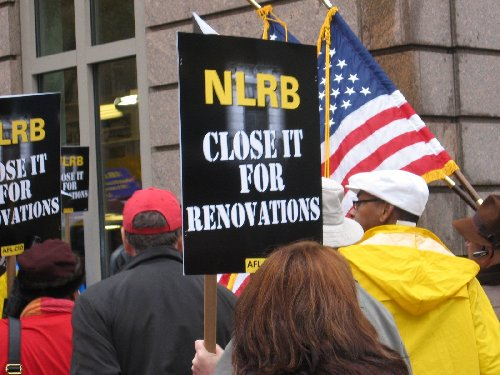
Union members picketing National Labor Relations Board rulings outside the agency's Washington, D.C., headquarters in November 2007

Picketing, as long as it does not cause obstruction to a highway or intimidation, is legal in many countries and in line with freedom of assembly laws, but many countries have restrictions on the use of picketing.

Legally defined, recognitional picketing is a method of picketing that applies economic pressure to an employer with the specific goal to force the employer to recognise the issues facing employees and address them by bargaining with a union. In the US, this type of picketing, under Section 8(b)(7)(A) of the National Labor Relations Act, is typically illegal if representation is not relevant or is unquestionable.

In the UK mass picketing was made illegal under the Trade Disputes and Trade Unions Act 1927, moved by the leaders of what would soon be National Labour, after the 1926 General Strike. Otherwise picketing was banned by the Liberal-tabled Criminal Law Amendment Act 1871 but is decriminalised by the Conservative-tabled Conspiracy and Protection of Property Act 1875. The Trade Union and Labour Relations (Consolidation) Act 1992 gives protection, under civil law, for pickets who are acting in connection with an industrial dispute at or near their workplace who are using their picketing peacefully to obtain or communicate information or persuading any person to work or abstain from working. However, many employers seek specific injunctions to limit the effect of picketing by their door if they can evidence a high likelihood of intimidation or, in general, on non-peaceful behaviour and/or any that significant numbers of the picketers are or will in all likelihood be non-workers.

In the US, any strike activity was hard to organise in the early 1900s, but picketing became more common after the Norris–La Guardia Act of 1932, which limited the ability of employers to gain injunctions to stop strikes, and further legislation to support the right to organise for unions. Mass picketing and secondary picketing was outlawed by the 1947 Taft–Hartley Act. Some kinds of pickets are constitutionally protected.

Viewing laws against stalking as potentially inconsistent with labour rights of picketing, the first anti-stalking law of the industrial world, made by California's lawmakers, inserted provisions that disapply many of its protections from "normal labor picketing", which has survived subsequent amendments.

== See also ==
- BCGEU v. British Columbia
- Bed-In, peace campaigns by John Lennon and Yoko Ono in 1969
- Bandh
- Dharna, fast undertaken at the door of an offender
- Die-in
- Gherao, a kind of picketing practiced in India and Nepal
- Hartal, Indian word for strike action.
- Human Be-In
- Lock-on
- Occupation (protest)
- Occupy movement
- Raasta roko
- Sitdown strike
- Teach-in
- Work-in
