= Raymond Ellis =

British politician

Member of Parliament for North East Derbyshire
- In office 1979–1987
- Preceded by: Thomas Swain
- Succeeded by: Harry Barnes

Personal details
- Born: 17 December 1923 Sheffield, United Kingdom
- Died: 20 April 1994 (aged 70) Sheffield, United Kingdom
- Party: Labour
- Profession: Politician

Raymond Joseph Ellis (17 December 1923 – 20 April 1994) was a British Labour Party politician.

Born in Sheffield, Ellis was MP for North East Derbyshire from 1979 to 1987, when he retired. He died in Sheffield aged 70.

Parliament of the United Kingdom
Preceded by Thomas Swain	Member of Parliament for Derbyshire North East; 1979–1987	Succeeded by Harry Barnes
Trade union offices
Preceded by Dennis Skinner	President of the Derbyshire Area of the National Union of Mineworkers; 1972–1979	Succeeded by ?
