= Henry White (British politician) =

Harold Neal

Member of Parliament for North East Derbyshire
- In office 1942–1959
- Preceded by: Frank Lee
- Succeeded by: Thomas Swain

Henry White (5 August 1890 – 4 February 1964) was a British Labour politician who served as Member of Parliament (MP) for the constituency of North East Derbyshire from 1942 to 1959.

White was a miner and served as vice-president of the Derbyshire Mineworkers' Association for four years and as a branch secretary for 18 years. He was a councillor and alderman on Derbyshire County Council for many years and divisional party organiser. He was first elected to Parliament unopposed in a by-election in 1942, following the death of the sitting MP Frank Lee. He died in Chesterfield aged 73.

Parliament of the United Kingdom
Preceded by Frank Lee	Member of Parliament for North East Derbyshire; 1942–1959	Succeeded by Thomas Henry Swain
Trade union offices
Preceded by ?	Vice-President of the Derbyshire Miners' Association; 1938–1942	Succeeded by Harold Neal
