= W. E. Harvey =

British MP (1852–1914)

W.E. Harvey
- Painting of William Edwin Harvey by Trevor Haddo
- Born: William Edwin Harvey; 5 September 1852; Hasland, Derbyshire, England
- Died: 28 April 1914 (aged 61)
- Political party: Liberal (before 1910; 1914)
- Other political affiliations: Labour (1910–14); Liberal-Labour

William Edwin Harvey (5 September 1852 – 28 April 1914), known as W. E. Harvey, was a British Lib-Lab Member of Parliament.

Born in Hasland, Derbyshire, Harvey worked in a coal mine from the age of ten. He joined the South Yorkshire Miners' Association (SYMA) in 1869, and was the union's local delegate by 1872. For his trade union activity, he was dismissed from the local pit, but managed to find work at Sheepbridge, then later at Morton. He also converted to Primitive Methodism and in his spare time was a lay preacher.

In 1880, the Derbyshire-based members of the SYMA split away to form the Derbyshire Miners' Association (DMA), and Harvey became the new union's first treasurer. He resigned in 1882, because union meetings clashed with cricket matches for his employer's team. However, the following year, he was elected as the union's assistant secretary. In 1891, he was elected to the national executive of the Miners' Federation of Great Britain (MFGB), serving on it in most subsequent years, and in 1894 he was the President of Chesterfield Trades Council.

Politically a classical liberal, strongly opposed to socialism and syndicalism, Harvey became the vice-president of the Labour Electoral Association in 1894. This organisation aimed to secure the election of workers under the auspices of the Liberal Party, and Harvey was elected to Chesterfield Borough Council in 1897, serving until his death.

In 1906, Harvey became financial and corresponding secretary of the DMA, and his high-profile secured him the Liberal Party candidacy in the 1907 North East Derbyshire by-election. He was successful, and reluctantly joined the Labour Party in 1910, on the instructions of his union. Despite his seat in Parliament, he remained an active trade unionist, serving as Vice-President of the MFGB from 1912, and as General and Financial Secretary of the DMA from 1913.

Harvey became increasingly unhappy with how the Labour Party was behaving towards the issue of Miners' representation. In particular he was unhappy with the way Barnet Kenyon was treated during and after the 1913 Chesterfield by-election. He therefore decided to resign the Labour whip and re-took the Liberal whip on 30 March 1914. He died, aged 61, almost a month later.

Parliament of the United Kingdom
Preceded by Thomas Bolton	Member of Parliament for North East Derbyshire; 1907 – 1914	Succeeded by George Robert Harland Bowden
Trade union offices
Preceded by Alfred Smalley and S. H. Whitehouse	Auditor of the Trades Union Congress; 1909; With: Alfred Smalley	Succeeded by John Cairns and Julia Varley
Preceded by John Cairns and Julia Varley	Auditor of the Trades Union Congress; 1911; With: James E. Tattersall	Succeeded by Edward Judson and David Watts Morgan
Preceded by Robert Smillie	Vice-President of the Miners' Federation of Great Britain; 1912–1914	Succeeded by William House
Preceded by James Haslam	Secretary of the Derbyshire Miners' Association; 1913–1914	Succeeded by Frank Hall
