= Frank Lee (British politician) =

British politician (1867–1941)

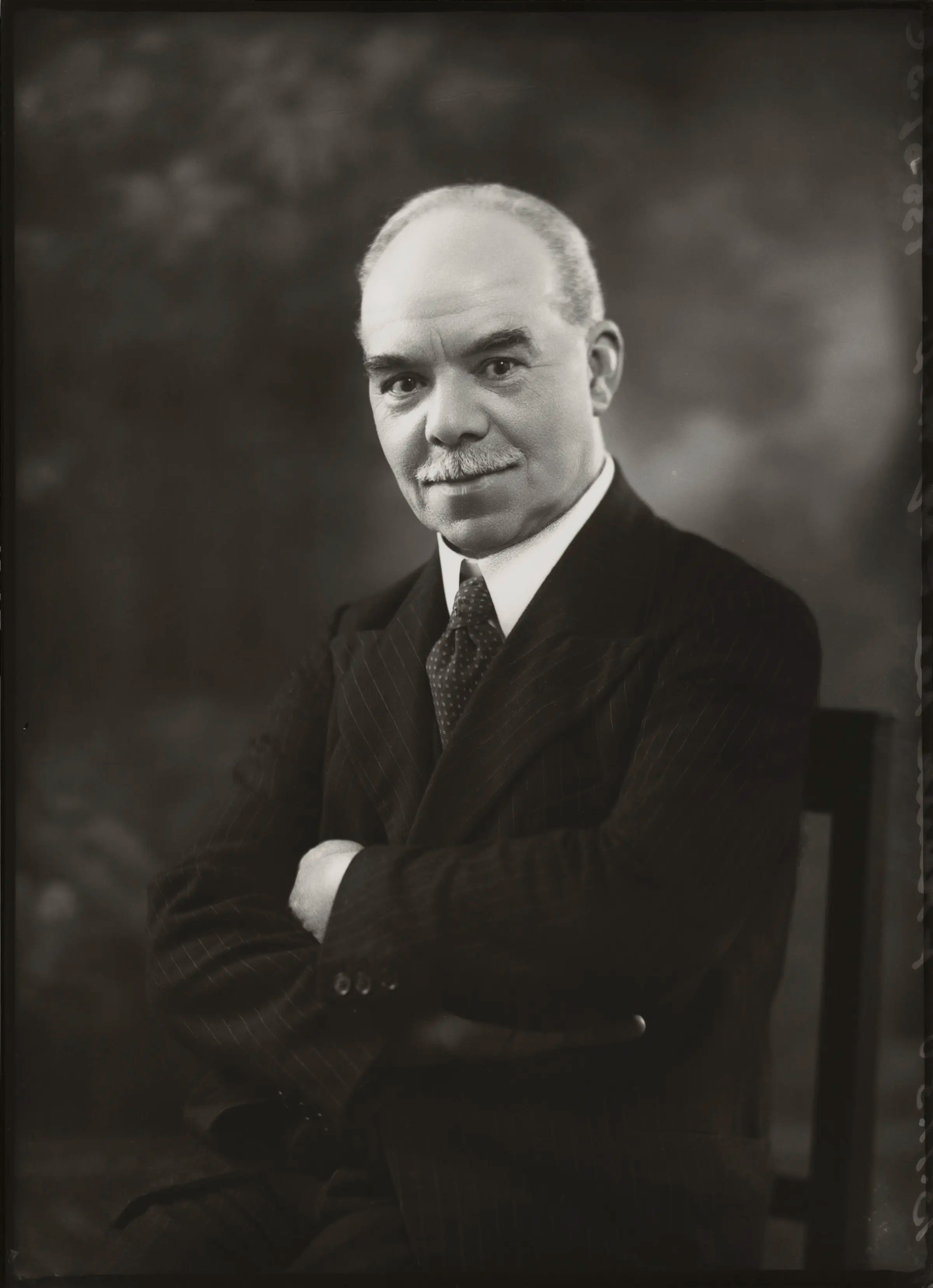
Lee in 1930

Frank Lee (1867 – 21 December 1941) was a Labour Party politician in the United Kingdom.

He was born in Tibshelf, Derbyshire and worked as a compensation agent for the Derbyshire Miners' Association, eventually becoming assistant secretary, and honorary secretary of the Derbyshire Miners' Convalescent Home at Skegness. He was also a governor of Sheffield University. He lived in Chesterfield.

At the 1922 general election, he was elected member of parliament (MP) for North East Derbyshire, and held the seat until 1931. He regained it in 1935 and was still the sitting member when he died in Chesterfield in 1941, aged 74.

Parliament of the United Kingdom
Preceded by Sir Stanley Holmes	Member of Parliament for North East Derbyshire; 1922–1931	Succeeded by Jardine Whyte
Preceded by Jardine Whyte	Member of Parliament for North East Derbyshire; 1935–1941	Succeeded by Henry White
