= North East Derbyshire (constituency) =

Parliamentary constituency in the United Kingdom, 1885 onwards

Coordinates: 53.24°N 1.55°W

- County constituency for the House of Commons
- Interactive map of boundaries since 2024
- Location within the East Midlands
- County: Derbyshire
- Electorate: 72,344 (March 2020)
- Major settlements: Clay Cross, Dronfield, Killamarsh, Staveley

Current constituency
- Created: 1885
- Member of Parliament: Louise Sandher-Jones (Labour Party)
- Seats: One
- Created from: East Derbyshire

North East Derbyshire is a constituency (Note: A county constituency (for the purposes of election expenses and type of returning officer)) created in 1885 represented in the House of Commons of the UK Parliament since 2024 by Louise Sandher-Jones of the Labour Party. (Note: As with all constituencies, the constituency elects one Member of Parliament (MP) by the first past the post system of election at least every five years.)

The seat had been, relative to others, a marginal seat from 2005 to 2017 as its winner's majority had not exceeded 5.7% of the vote since the 23.2% majority won in that year. The seat changed hands in 2017 as the first Conservative victory since 1935 but reverted to Labour in 2024.

== Constituency profile ==
North East Derbyshire is a constituency in Derbyshire in the East Midlands of England, covering the towns and villages surrounding the large town of Chesterfield. Its largest town is Dronfield, which has a population of around 21,000. Other settlements include the towns of Eckington, Clay Cross and part of Staveley, and the villages of Killamarsh, New Whittington, Wingerworth, Grassmoor, Tupton and North Wingfield.

This area has an industrial heritage with a history of engineering and coal mining, industries which mostly closed during the late 20th century. Dronfield, Eckington and Killamarsh, in the constituency's north, are located on the outskirts of Sheffield and serve largely as commuter suburbs for the city. The western edge of the constituency lies within the Peak District national park and contains small, rural villages. Staveley and Clay Cross have high levels of deprivation whilst the rest of the constituency is more affluent, giving the constituency an average level of wealth overall. House prices are generally lower than the national average but similar to the rest of the East Midlands.

North East Derbyshire has a large retired population and a relatively low proportion of younger adults. In general, residents have high rates of homeownership and average levels of household income. The child poverty rate is in line with the national average. Residents have below-average levels of education and high proportion of residents work in the manufacturing and construction industries. A low percentage claim unemployment benefits. White people made up 97% of the population at the 2021 census.

At the local district council level, most of the constituency is represented by the Labour Party with some Conservative councillors elected in Dronfield and the rural west and Liberal Democrats in Tupton. At the county council, which held elections in 2025, the Labour areas instead elected mostly Reform UK representatives. Voters in North East Derbyshire strongly supported leaving the European Union in the 2016 referendum; an estimated 62% voted in favour of Brexit compared to the UK-wide figure of 52%.

== History ==
Summary of results

The seat was created in the Redistribution of Seats Act 1885. Until 1910, the area was regularly represented by a Liberal MP. From the 1935 to the 2015 elections inclusive N.E. Derbyshire returned Labour candidates in succession. In 2010 and 2015 the results featured marginal majorities (a majority of relatively few percentage points between the winner's and the runner-up's tallies). The runner-up candidate from 1945 to 2015 inclusive was Conservative. The 2015 result for example gave the seat the 17th-smallest majority of Labour's 232 seats by percentage of majority. The seat was at the following election one of six gains between the two parties counterbalancing Conservative losses (the party emerged as the biggest single party by more than fifty seats and with an increased share of the vote but with a net loss of thirteen seats). Rowley's local majority was 5.7% of votes cast.

Other parties

In line with nationwide swing in 2015, UKIP fielded a candidate who won more than 5% of the vote therefore kept their deposit; the Liberal Democrat candidate forfeited their deposit in 2015. The Green Party fielded a candidate for the first time in 2015; the party's Kesteven forfeited his deposit. These three parties forfeited their deposits in 2017.

Turnout

Turnout has ranged from 58.9% in 2001 to 86.4% in 1950.

== Boundaries ==
The boundaries of North East Derbyshire from 1983 to 2010

1885–1918: The Sessional Division of Eckington, and in the Sessional Division of Chesterfield the parishes of Bolsover, Staveley, and Whittington.

1918–1950: The Urban Districts of Urban Districts of Bolsover and Dronfield, the Rural Districts of Clowne and Norton, and part of the Rural District of Chesterfield.

1950–1983: The Urban Districts of Clay Cross and Dronfield, and part of the Rural District of Chesterfield.

1983–2010: The District of North East Derbyshire wards of Ashover, Barlow and Holmesfield, Brampton and Walton, Clay Cross North, Clay Cross South, Coal Aston, Dronfield North, Dronfield South, Dronfield Woodhouse, Eckington North, Eckington South, Gosforth Valley, Hasland, Holmewood and Heath, Killamarsh East, Killamarsh West, North Wingfield Central, Renishaw, Ridgeway and Marsh Lane, Tupton, Unstone, and Wingerworth, and the Borough of Chesterfield wards of Barrow Hill and Hollingwood, and Lowgates and Woodthorpe.

2010–present: The District of North East Derbyshire wards of Ashover, Barlow and Holmesfield, Brampton and Walton, Clay Cross North, Clay Cross South, Coal Aston, Dronfield North, Dronfield South, Dronfield Woodhouse, Eckington North, Eckington South, Gosforth Valley, Grassmoor, Killamarsh East, Killamarsh West, North Wingfield Central, Renishaw, Ridgeway and Marsh Lane, Tupton, Unstone, and Wingerworth; and the Borough of Chesterfield wards of Barrow Hill and New Whittington, and Lowgates and Woodthorpe^{1}.

^{1} Further to a local government boundary review which came into effect in May 2023, the parts in the Borough of Chesterfield now comprise the Stapeley North ward, the majority of the Whittington ward, and a small part of the Stapeley Central ward.

Subject to a minor adjustment due to ward boundary changes in the District of North East Derbyshire, the 2023 review of Westminster constituencies, which was based on the ward structure in place at 1 December 2020, left the boundaries unchanged.

The North East Derbyshire constituency covers the north eastern part of Derbyshire, surrounding Chesterfield on three sides. It covers most of the area of North East Derbyshire District Council.

== Members of Parliament ==
East Derbyshire prior to 1885

Election	Member	Party!
1885	Francis Egerton	Liberal
1886	Thomas Bolton	Liberal
1907 by-election	William Harvey	Liberal
January 1910	William Harvey	Labour
1914 by-election	George Bowden	Unionist
1918	Stanley Holmes	Liberal
1922	Frank Lee	Labour
1931	Jardine Whyte	Conservative
1935	Frank Lee	Labour
1942 by-election	Henry White	Labour
1959	Tom Swain	Labour
1979	Ray Ellis	Labour
1987	Harry Barnes	Labour
2005	Natascha Engel	Labour
2017	Lee Rowley	Conservative
2024	Louise Jones	Labour

== Elections ==
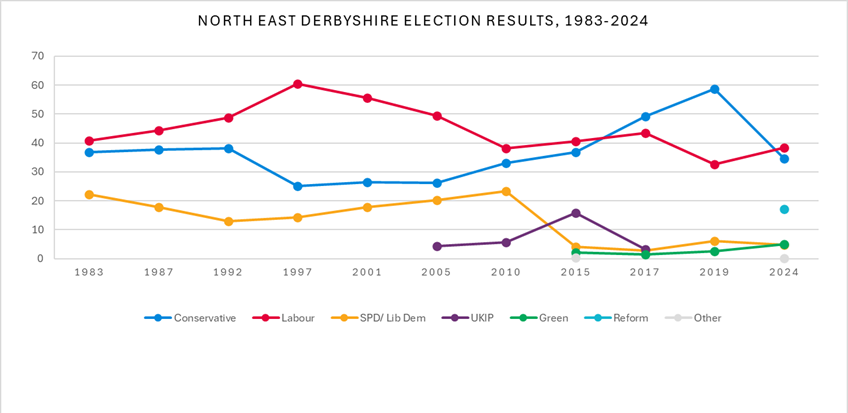
North East Derbyshire election results 1983-2024

=== Elections in the 2020s ===
General election 2024: North East Derbyshire
Party	Candidate	Votes	%	±%
Labour	Louise Sandher-Jones	17,591	38.4	+6.1
Conservative	Lee Rowley	15,838	34.5	−23.9
Reform	Andy Egginton	7,899	17.2	+16.7
Green	Frank Adlington-Stringer	2,271	5.0	+2.3
Liberal Democrats	Ross Shipman	2,159	4.7	−1.4
Freedom Alliance	Wesley Massumbukolt	108	0.2	N/A
Majority		1,753	3.9	N/A
Turnout		45,866	62.6	−5.4
Registered electors		73,139		
Labour gain from Conservative		Swing	▲15.0	

=== Elections in the 2010s ===
General election 2019: North East Derbyshire
Party	Candidate	Votes	%	±%
Conservative	Lee Rowley	28,897	58.7	▲9.5
Labour	Chris Peace	16,021	32.6	▼10.9
Liberal Democrats	Ross Shipman	3,021	6.1	▲3.3
Green	Frank Adlington-Stringer	1,278	2.6	▲1.2
Majority		12,876	26.1	▲20.4
Turnout		49,217	68.0	▼1.9
Conservative hold		Swing	▲10.2	

General election 2017: North East Derbyshire
Party	Candidate	Votes	%	±%
Conservative	Lee Rowley	24,784	49.2	▲12.5
Labour	Natascha Engel	21,923	43.5	▲2.9
UKIP	James Bush	1,565	3.1	▼12.8
Liberal Democrats	David Lomax	1,390	2.8	▼1.4
Green	David Kesteven	719	1.4	▼0.8
Majority		2,861	5.7	N/A
Turnout		50,381	69.9	▲2.8
Conservative gain from Labour		Swing	▲4.8	

General election 2015: North East Derbyshire
Party	Candidate	Votes	%	±%
Labour	Natascha Engel	19,488	40.6	+2.4
Conservative	Lee Rowley	17,605	36.7	+3.7
UKIP	James Bush	7,631	15.9	+10.3
Liberal Democrats	David Batey	2,004	4.2	−19.1
Green	David Kesteven	1,059	2.2	New
Independent	Rob Lane	161	0.3	New
Majority		1,883	3.9	−1.3
Turnout		47,948	67.1	+1.2
Labour hold		Swing	-0.6	

General election 2010: North East Derbyshire
Party	Candidate	Votes	%	±%
Labour	Natascha Engel	17,948	38.2	−10.1
Conservative	Huw Merriman	15,503	33.0	+7.0
Liberal Democrats	Richard Bull	10,947	23.3	+1.8
UKIP	James Bush	2,636	5.6	+1.2
Majority		2,445	5.2	−18.0
Turnout		47,034	65.9	+4.7
Labour hold		Swing	−8.6	

=== Elections in the 2000s ===
General election 2005: North East Derbyshire
Party	Candidate	Votes	%	±%
Labour	Natascha Engel	21,416	49.3	−6.3
Conservative	Dominic Johnson	11,351	26.1	−0.4
Liberal Democrats	Tom Snowdon	8,812	20.3	+2.5
UKIP	Kenneth Perkins	1,855	4.3	New
Majority		10,065	23.2	−5.9
Turnout		43,434	61.2	+2.3
Labour hold		Swing	−3.0	

General election 2001: North East Derbyshire
Party	Candidate	Votes	%	±%
Labour	Harry Barnes	23,437	55.6	−4.9
Conservative	James Hollingsworth	11,179	26.5	+1.3
Liberal Democrats	Mark Higginbottom	7,508	17.8	+3.5
Majority		12,258	29.1	−6.2
Turnout		42,124	58.9	−13.6
Labour hold		Swing	−3.1	

=== Elections in the 1990s ===
General election 1997: North East Derbyshire
Party	Candidate	Votes	%	±%
Labour	Harry Barnes	31,425	60.5	+11.7
Conservative	Simon Elliott	13,104	25.2	−13.0
Liberal Democrats	Stephen Hardy	7,450	14.3	+1.3
Majority		18,321	35.3	+24.7
Turnout		51,979	71.5	−9.1
Labour hold		Swing		

General election 1992: North East Derbyshire
Party	Candidate	Votes	%	±%
Labour	Harry Barnes	28,860	48.8	+4.4
Conservative	John Hayes	22,590	38.2	+0.5
Liberal Democrats	D Stone	7,675	13.0	−4.9
Majority		6,270	10.6	+3.9
Turnout		59,125	80.6	+1.3
Labour hold		Swing	+2.0	

=== Elections in the 1980s ===
General election 1987: North East Derbyshire
Party	Candidate	Votes	%	±%
Labour	Harry Barnes	24,747	44.4	+3.6
Conservative	John Hayes	21,027	37.7	+0.8
SDP	Stephen Hardy	9,985	17.9	−4.3
Majority		3,720	6.7	+2.8
Turnout		55,759	79.3	0.0
Labour hold		Swing		

General election 1983: North East Derbyshire
Party	Candidate	Votes	%	±%
Labour	Raymond Ellis	21,094	40.8	
Conservative	Ian Bridge	19,088	36.9	
SDP	Stephen Hardy	11,494	22.2	
Majority		2,006	3.9	
Turnout		51,676	79.3	
Labour hold		Swing		

=== Elections in the 1970s ===
General election 1979: North East Derbyshire
Party	Candidate	Votes	%	±%
Labour	Raymond Ellis	27,218	48.1	−1.8
Conservative	E. Oliver	21,889	38.7	+9.0
Liberal	P. Hall	7,436	13.2	−7.2
Majority		5,329	9.4	−10.8
Turnout		56,543	79.9	+6.5
Labour hold		Swing		

General election October 1974: North East Derbyshire
Party	Candidate	Votes	%	±%
Labour	Thomas Swain	25,234	49.9	−7.1
Conservative	J. C. Ramsden	14,997	29.7	−13.3
Liberal	C. Cook	10,336	20.4	New
Majority		10,237	20.2	+6.2
Turnout		50,567	73.4	−5.0
Labour hold		Swing		

General election February 1974: North East Derbyshire
Party	Candidate	Votes	%	±%
Labour	Thomas Swain	29,602	57.0	−3.9
Conservative	J. C. Ramsden	22,320	43.0	+3.9
Majority		7,282	14.0	−7.7
Turnout		51,922	78.4	+8.6
Labour hold		Swing		

General election 1970: North East Derbyshire
Party	Candidate	Votes	%	±%
Labour	Thomas Swain	38,181	60.9	−6.0
Conservative	John P Pashley	24,550	39.1	+6.0
Majority		13,631	21.8	−12.0
Turnout		62,731	69.8	−4.1
Labour hold		Swing		

=== Elections in the 1960s ===
General election 1966: North East Derbyshire
Party	Candidate	Votes	%	±%
Labour	Thomas Swain	38,723	66.9	+2.7
Conservative	Michael Fabian Spungin	19,123	33.1	−2.7
Majority		19,600	33.8	+5.4
Turnout		57,846	73.9	−4.0
Labour hold		Swing		

General election 1964: North East Derbyshire
Party	Candidate	Votes	%	±%
Labour	Thomas Swain	38,657	64.2	+1.3
Conservative	Michael Fabian Spungin	21,564	35.8	−1.3
Majority		17,093	28.4	+2.6
Turnout		60,221	77.9	−2.9
Labour hold		Swing		

=== Elections in the 1950s ===
General election 1959: North East Derbyshire
Party	Candidate	Votes	%	±%
Labour	Thomas Swain	37,444	62.9	−3.6
Conservative	Robert A Ward	22,112	37.1	+3.6
Majority		15,332	25.8	−7.2
Turnout		59,556	80.8	+4.1
Labour hold		Swing		

General election 1955: North East Derbyshire
Party	Candidate	Votes	%	±%
Labour	Henry White	34,965	66.5	−0.2
Conservative	George R Shaw	17,621	33.5	+0.2
Majority		17,344	33.0	−0.4
Turnout		52,586	76.7	−7.7
Labour hold		Swing		

General election 1951: North East Derbyshire
Party	Candidate	Votes	%	±%
Labour	Henry White	33,376	66.7	+0.4
Conservative	Peter Hughes	16,655	33.3	−0.5
Majority		16,721	33.4	+0.9
Turnout		50,031	84.4	−2.0
Labour hold		Swing		

General election 1950: North East Derbyshire
Party	Candidate	Votes	%	±%
Labour	Henry White	33,417	66.3	
Conservative	George R Shaw	17,021	33.8	
Majority		16,396	32.5	
Turnout		50,438	86.4	
Labour hold		Swing		

=== Elections in the 1940s ===
General election 1945: North East Derbyshire
Party	Candidate	Votes	%	±%
Labour	Henry White	35,795	65.6	+8.4
Conservative	Ronald Edward Warlow	18,789	34.4	−1.2
Majority		17,006	31.2	+9.6
Turnout		54,584	79.0	+1.1
Labour hold		Swing		

1942 North East Derbyshire by-election
Party	Candidate	Votes	%	±%
Labour	Henry White	Unopposed	N/A	N/A
Labour hold				

=== Elections in the 1930s ===
General election 1935: North East Derbyshire
Party	Candidate	Votes	%	±%
Labour	Frank Lee	25,382	57.2	+6.4
Conservative	Horace Trevor-Cox	15,802	35.6	−15.2
Liberal	Arthur Thomas Marwood	3,186	7.2	New
Majority		9,580	21.6	N/A
Turnout		44,370	77.9	−1.4
Labour gain from Conservative		Swing		

General election 1931: North East Derbyshire
Party	Candidate	Votes	%	±%
Conservative	Jardine Whyte	20,719	50.79	
Labour	Frank Lee	19,385	47.52	
New Party	Albert Vincent Williams	689	1.69	New
Majority		1,334	3.27	N/A
Turnout		40,793	79.35	
Conservative gain from Labour		Swing		

=== Elections in the 1920s ===
General election 1929: North East Derbyshire
Party	Candidate	Votes	%	±%
Labour	Frank Lee	21,633	54.6	+9.7
Unionist	Rupert Eric Herbert Samuelson	9,167	23.1	−10.1
Liberal	Harry Briggs	8,861	22.3	+0.4
Majority		12,466	31.5	−19.8
Turnout		39,661	79.8	+1.3
Labour hold		Swing	+9.9	

General election 1924: North East Derbyshire
Party	Candidate	Votes	%	±%
Labour	Frank Lee	13,420	44.9	+5.4
Unionist	George Bowden	9,914	33.2	+1.7
Liberal	Philip Guedalla	6,529	21.9	−7.1
Majority		3,506	11.7	+3.7
Turnout		29,863	78.5	+2.7
Labour hold		Swing	+1.8	

General election 1923: North East Derbyshire
Party	Candidate	Votes	%	±%
Labour	Frank Lee	10,971	39.5	+5.6
Unionist	Charles Waterhouse	8,768	31.5	−0.7
Liberal	Philip Guedalla	8,080	29.0	−4.9
Majority		2,203	8.0	+8.0
Turnout		27,819	75.8	−1.5
Labour hold		Swing	+3.1	

General election 1922: North East Derbyshire
Party	Candidate	Votes	%	±%
Labour	Frank Lee	9,359	33.9	+5.3
Liberal	Stanley Holmes	9,344	33.9	+2.5
Unionist	Charles Waterhouse	8,877	32.2	+18.1
Majority		15	0.0	N/A
Turnout		27,580	77.3	+19.3
Labour gain from Liberal		Swing		

=== Elections in the 1910s ===
General election 1918: North East Derbyshire
Party		Candidate	Votes	%	±%
	Liberal	Stanley Holmes	6,117	31.4	N/A
	Labour	Frank Lee	5,560	28.6	−27.7
	Ind. Unionist	George Bowden	5,049	25.9	N/A
C	Unionist	Edward Cavendish	2,738	14.1	−29.6
Majority			557	2.8	N/A
Turnout			19,464	58.0	−20.7
	Liberal gain from Labour		Swing		
C indicates candidate endorsed by the coalition government.

General Election 1914–15:

Another General Election was required to take place before the end of 1915. The political parties had been making preparations for an election to take place and by July 1914, the following candidates had been selected;

- Unionist: George Bowden
- Liberal: John Houfton

Bowden

1914 North East Derbyshire by-election
Party	Candidate	Votes	%	±%
Unionist	George Bowden	6,469	39.7	−4.0
Liberal	John Houfton	6,155	37.8	New
Labour	James Martin	3,669	22.5	−33.8
Majority		314	1.9	N/A
Turnout		16,293	84.2	+5.5
Registered electors		19,340		
Unionist gain from Labour		Swing	+14.9	

Harvey

General election December 1910: North East Derbyshire
Party	Candidate	Votes	%	±%
Labour	W. E. Harvey	7,838	56.3	−1.3
Conservative	Josiah Court	6,088	43.7	+1.3
Majority		1,750	12.6	−2.6
Turnout		13,926	78.7	−6.8
Registered electors		17,701		
Labour hold		Swing	−1.3	

General election January 1910: North East Derbyshire
Party	Candidate	Votes	%	±%
Labour	W. E. Harvey	8,715	57.6	New
Conservative	Josiah Court	6,411	42.4	−1.1
Majority		2,304	15.2	N/A
Turnout		15,126	85.5	+0.2
Registered electors		17,701		
Labour gain from Liberal		Swing		

=== Elections in the 1900s ===
1907 North East Derbyshire by-election
Party	Candidate	Votes	%	±%
Lib-Lab	W. E. Harvey	6,644	52.9	−3.6
Conservative	Josiah Court	5,915	47.1	+3.6
Majority		729	5.8	−7.2
Turnout		12,559	77.4	−7.9
Registered electors		16,233		
Lib-Lab hold		Swing	−3.6	

General election 1906:North East Derbyshire
Party	Candidate	Votes	%	±%
Liberal	Thomas Bolton	7,665	56.5	+5.2
Conservative	Josiah Court	5,896	43.5	−5.2
Majority		1,769	13.0	+10.4
Turnout		13,561	85.3	+4.9
Registered electors		15,898		
Liberal hold		Swing	+5.2	

General election 1900:North East Derbyshire
Party	Candidate	Votes	%	±%
Liberal	Thomas Bolton	5,251	51.3	−1.6
Conservative	Josiah Court	4,983	48.7	+1.6
Majority		268	2.6	−3.2
Turnout		10,234	80.4	−0.5
Registered electors		12,732		
Liberal hold		Swing	−1.6	

=== Elections in the 1890s ===
Thomas Bolton

General election 1895: North East Derbyshire
Party	Candidate	Votes	%	±%
Liberal	Thomas Bolton	4,737	52.9	−10.3
Conservative	Josiah Court	4,210	47.1	+10.3
Majority		527	5.8	−20.6
Turnout		8,947	80.9	+3.5
Registered electors		11,066		
Liberal hold		Swing	−10.3	

General election 1892: North East Derbyshire
Party	Candidate	Votes	%	±%
Liberal	Thomas Bolton	5,206	63.2	+8.1
Conservative	Frederic Gorell Barnes	3,034	36.8	−8.1
Majority		2,172	26.4	+16.2
Turnout		8,240	77.4	+1.0
Registered electors		10,643		
Liberal hold		Swing	+8.1	

=== Elections in the 1880s ===
General election 1886: North East Derbyshire
Party	Candidate	Votes	%	±%
Liberal	Thomas Bolton	3,879	55.1	−11.2
Liberal Unionist	Charles Markham	3,158	44.9	+11.2
Majority		721	10.2	−22.4
Turnout		7,037	76.4	−5.4
Registered electors		9,207		
Liberal hold		Swing	−11.2	

General election 1885: North East Derbyshire
Party	Candidate	Votes	%	±%
Liberal	Francis Egerton	4,999	66.3	
Conservative	Charles Gould (barrister)	2,536	33.7	
Majority		2,463	32.6	
Turnout		7,535	81.8	
Registered electors		9,207		
Liberal win (new seat)				

== See also ==
- List of parliamentary constituencies in Derbyshire
