= Harland Bowden =

British engineer and politician (1873–1927)

Harland Bowden

Lieutenant Colonel George Robert Harland Bowden (1873 – 10 October 1927) was a British mechanical engineer and Conservative Party politician.

Born in Durham, at the age of 15 he was apprenticed to Lambton Collieries whilst attending classes at Durham College of Science.

In 1890 he moved to South Wales as improver for the ironworks at Tondu. In 1891 he became assistant engineer and chief draughtsman at Cyfarthfa Ironworks, Merthyr Tydfil. He returned to North East England in 1896 as manager of D Selby Bigge and Company, an engineering company based in Newcastle. In 1902 he founded his own company, G Harland Bowden and Company, consulting engineers of Victoria Street, London. The firm specialised in the design and installation of colliery and factory plants. In 1908 he became a Member of the Institute of Mechanical Engineers.

In 1907 Bowden was granted a Volunteer Force commission in the Royal Garrison Artillery.

Bowden was active in Conservative Party politics, and in April 1912 was adopted as the party's prospective candidate for the parliamentary constituency of North East Derbyshire. In April 1914 the sitting Labour Party member of parliament for North East Derbyshire died, causing a by-election. The by-election was held on 20 May, and Bowden was elected to the Commons, gaining the seat for the Conservatives with a majority of 314 votes. During World War I Bowden became commanding officer of 17th (Empire) Battalion, the Royal Fusiliers, a war-formed unit. He continued to hold his parliamentary seat during the war, but found himself estranged from the Conservative Party, going so far as to issue libel proceedings against a party official. At the 1918 general election he defended his seat as an Independent Conservative, opposed by a Conservative candidate who had the support of the Coalition Government. He lost his seat to the Liberal candidate, finishing in third place. In October 1919 he was awarded 125 pounds in damages for libel against the vice-chairman of the North East Derbyshire Unionist Association. By the time of the 1924 general election Bowden had repaired his ties to the Conservatives, and stood as the party's candidate in North East Derbyshire once more. He was unsuccessful, with the Labour Party holding the seat.

He died suddenly at his home, "Rodney", Belmont Hill, St Albans in October 1927, aged 54.

Parliament of the United Kingdom
Preceded by William Edwin Harvey	Member of Parliament for North East Derbyshire; 1914–1918	Succeeded by Stanley Holmes
