= Thomas Swain =

British politician (1911-1979)

Thomas Henry Swain

Member of Parliament for North East Derbyshire
- In office 1959–1979
- Preceded by: Henry White
- Succeeded by: Raymond Ellis

Personal details
- Born: 29 October 1911 Burton upon Trent, England
- Died: 2 March 1979 (aged 67) Chesterfield, England
- Party: Labour
- Education: Broadway School (Burton upon Trent)
- Occupation: Miner, Trade Unionist, Politician

Thomas Henry Swain (29 October 1911 – 2 March 1979) was a British Labour politician who served as Member of Parliament for the constituency of North East Derbyshire from 1959 until he died in office 20 years later.

Born in Burton upon Trent, Swain was educated at the town's Broadway School. He was a miner for 34 years, from the age of 14 up to his election to Parliament, and held various offices in the National Union of Mineworkers including vice-president of the Derbyshire area. He was a councillor on Derbyshire County Council.

Swain was elected to Parliament in the 1959 general election. He died in a road accident in Chesterfield in March 1979 at the age of 67, and his seat was vacant when the general election was called for that May. Four weeks after his death, the Labour government lost a vital vote of confidence by a single vote, leading to the election which brought Margaret Thatcher to power. Had he not been killed, the vote of confidence would have ended in a tie and, by precedent, the Speaker's casting vote would have gone to the government.

== Personal life ==
He had 10 living children, 1 died.

Parliament of the United Kingdom
Preceded by Henry White	Member of Parliament for North East Derbyshire; 1959–1979	Succeeded by Raymond Ellis
