= List of listed buildings in Kirkcudbright, Dumfries and Galloway =

This is a list of listed buildings in the parish of Kirkcudbright in Dumfries and Galloway, Scotland.

== List ==
Name	Location	Date Listed	Grid Ref. (Note: Sometimes known as OSGB36, the grid reference (where provided) is based on the British national grid reference system used by the Ordnance Survey. • "Guide to National Grid". Ordnance Survey. • "Get-a-map". Ordnance Survey.)	Geo-coordinates	Notes	LB Number (Note: Historic Environment Scotland assign a unique alphanumeric identifier to each designated site in Scotland, for listed buildings this always begins with "LB", for example "LB12345".)	Image
15 And 17 Millburn Street				54°50′17″N 4°02′46″W	Category C(S)	36565	Upload Photo
9 St Cuthbert's Street				54°50′13″N 4°03′00″W	Category C(S)	36571	Upload Photo
38 St Cuthbert's Street				54°50′12″N 4°03′02″W	Category C(S)	36590	Upload Photo
15 St Mary's Place, Townend				54°50′05″N 4°03′03″W	Category C(S)	36595	Upload Photo
21, 23 And 25 St Mary's Place, Townend				54°50′05″N 4°03′02″W	Category C(S)	36598	Upload Photo
35 And 37 St Mary's Street, Royal Bank Of Scotland And Royal Hotel				54°50′12″N 4°02′56″W	Category C(S)	36611	Upload Photo
9 Union Street				54°50′10″N 4°03′14″W	Category C(S)	36630	Upload Photo
23 Union Street				54°50′10″N 4°03′16″W	Category C(S)	36634	Upload Photo
4 Union Street				54°50′10″N 4°03′12″W	Category C(S)	36637	Upload Photo
Castle Street, Maclellan's Castle				54°50′13″N 4°03′11″W	Category A	36484	Upload another image
14 Castle Street				54°50′11″N 4°03′11″W	Category C(S)	36489	Upload Photo
22 Castle Street				54°50′10″N 4°03′12″W	Category B	36491	Upload Photo
13 And 15 Church Place				54°50′08″N 4°02′57″W	Category C(S)	36500	Upload Photo
3, 5 High Street And Gazebo				54°50′13″N 4°03′14″W	Category B	36502	Upload Photo
7, 9 High Street				54°50′12″N 4°03′13″W	Category B	36503	Upload another image
17, 19 And 21 High Street				54°50′12″N 4°03′14″W	Category B	36505	Upload another image
27 And 29 High Street				54°50′11″N 4°03′16″W	Category B	36507	Upload Photo
39, 41 And 43 High Street				54°50′10″N 4°03′17″W	Category C(S)	36510	Upload Photo
81 High Street				54°50′08″N 4°03′18″W	Category C(S)	36516	Upload Photo
109 And 111 High Street				54°50′06″N 4°03′11″W	Category C(S)	36521	Upload Photo
8 High Street, Blair House And Summer House And Walls To Castle Dykes				54°50′13″N 4°03′16″W	Category A	36529	Upload another image
54 And 56 High Street, The Rectory				54°50′08″N 4°03′21″W	Category B	36541	Upload Photo
High Street, Tolbooth, Market Cross And Well				54°50′08″N 4°03′20″W	Category A	36542	Upload another image
64 High Street (Milroys House) And The Cottage, Steeple Close, 64A High Street				54°50′07″N 4°03′20″W	Category B	36544	Upload Photo
74 High Street And Cannon's Close				54°50′07″N 4°03′19″W	Category A	36546	Upload Photo
76-82 (Even) High Street (82 In Police Close)				54°50′06″N 4°03′18″W	Category B	36547	Upload Photo
110 High Street				54°50′06″N 4°03′13″W	Category B	36554	Upload Photo
140 High Street				54°50′05″N 4°03′09″W	Category C(S)	36560	Upload Photo
Castlebank, Harbour Cottage Gallery				54°50′15″N 4°03′10″W	Category B	36456	Upload another image
1 And 3 Castle Street				54°50′12″N 4°03′08″W	Category C(S)	36461	Upload Photo
34 St Cuthbert's Street				54°50′12″N 4°03′03″W	Category C(S)	36588	Upload Photo
St Mary's Street, Town Hall				54°50′10″N 4°03′00″W	Category B	36604	Upload another image
49 St Mary's Street				54°50′14″N 4°02′54″W	Category C(S)	36613	Upload Photo
St Mary's Street, St Mary's Church				54°50′16″N 4°02′50″W	Category B	36616	Upload another image
St Mary's Street, Selkirk Memorial				54°50′13″N 4°02′58″W	Category C(S)	36622	Upload Photo
34, 36, 38 And 40 St Mary's Street				54°50′15″N 4°02′55″W	Category C(S)	36624	Upload Photo
St Mary's Wynd And 60 High Street, Anchorage				54°50′08″N 4°03′21″W	Category B	36625	Upload Photo
27 Castle Street				54°50′09″N 4°03′11″W	Category C(S)	36471	Upload Photo
39 Castle Street				54°50′08″N 4°03′12″W	Category B	36477	Upload Photo
32 Castle Street				54°50′09″N 4°03′12″W	Category C(S)	36494	Upload Photo
15A High Street And 1 Gordon Place				54°50′12″N 4°03′14″W	Category C(S)	36504	Upload Photo
23 And 25 High Street				54°50′12″N 4°03′16″W	Category B	36506	Upload Photo
High Street, Selkirk Arms Hotel And Close And 127 High Street				54°50′05″N 4°03′07″W	Category B	36524	Upload another image
66 (Wynd End) W. Side Of Close, 68 E. Side Of Close And 70 High Street				54°50′07″N 4°03′20″W	Category A	36545	Upload Photo
138 High Street				54°50′05″N 4°03′09″W	Category C(S)	36559	Upload Photo
Castlebank, The Old Studio				54°50′13″N 4°03′13″W	Category C(S)	36454	Upload Photo
1-9 (Odd Nos) Castle Gardens				54°50′12″N 4°03′11″W	Category B	36458	Upload Photo
5 Castle Street				54°50′12″N 4°03′09″W	Category C(S)	36462	Upload Photo
Galloway Hydroelectric Power Scheme, Tongland Dam				54°52′09″N 4°01′28″W	Category B	51698	Upload Photo
8 St Cuthbert's Street				54°50′12″N 4°03′07″W	Category C(S)	36581	Upload Photo
14 St Cuthbert's Street				54°50′12″N 4°03′06″W	Category C(S)	36583	Upload Photo
20 And 22 St Cuthbert's Street				54°50′12″N 4°03′05″W	Category C(S)	36585	Upload Photo
10 St Mary's Place, Saddler's Croft				54°50′04″N 4°03′04″W	Category B	36602	Upload Photo
23 And 25 St Mary's Street				54°50′11″N 4°02′57″W	Category B	36608	Upload Photo
51 St Mary's Street				54°50′14″N 4°02′54″W	Category C(S)	36614	Upload Photo
St Mary's Street, Kirkcudbright Parish Church				54°50′11″N 4°03′03″W	Category B	36621	Upload another image
30 And 32 St Mary's Street				54°50′15″N 4°02′55″W	Category B	36623	Upload Photo
St Mary's Wynd, Kirkcudbright Academy And Cochran Memorial Gymnasium				54°50′06″N 4°03′25″W	Category C(S)	36626	Upload Photo
1 Union Street				54°50′09″N 4°03′12″W	Category C(S)	36627	Upload Photo
15, 17 And 19 Union Street				54°50′10″N 4°03′15″W	Category C(S)	36632	Upload Photo
14 And 16 Union Street				54°50′10″N 4°03′14″W	Category B	36640	Upload Photo
35 Castle Street				54°50′08″N 4°03′11″W	Category C(S)	36475	Upload Photo
55 Castle Street (Through Cobbled Pend)				54°50′06″N 4°03′12″W	Category C(S)	36482	Upload Photo
Castle Street, War Memorial, 1st And 2nd World Wars				54°50′13″N 4°03′09″W	Category C(S)	36485	Upload Photo
16 Castle Street, Castle Guest House				54°50′11″N 4°03′11″W	Category B	36490	Upload Photo
28, 30 Castle Street				54°50′09″N 4°03′12″W	Category C(S)	36493	Upload Photo
46, 48 Castle Street				54°50′08″N 4°03′13″W	Category C(S)	36496	Upload Photo
3, 5, 7 And 9 Church Place				54°50′09″N 4°02′59″W	Category C(S)	36498	Upload Photo
1 High Street				54°50′14″N 4°03′14″W	Category B	36501	Upload Photo
33 High Street				54°50′11″N 4°03′17″W	Category C(S)	36508	Upload Photo
77 High Street				54°50′08″N 4°03′18″W	Category C(S)	36515	Upload Photo
105 High Street				54°50′06″N 4°03′12″W	Category B	36520	Upload Photo
High Street, Cannonwalls				54°50′06″N 4°03′10″W	Category B	36522	Upload Photo
2 High Street, Moatwell				54°50′15″N 4°03′14″W	Category B	36526	Upload Photo
4 High Street				54°50′14″N 4°03′14″W	Category B	36527	Upload Photo
16 High Street				54°50′12″N 4°03′17″W	Category B	36533	Upload Photo
18 High Street				54°50′11″N 4°03′17″W	Category B	36534	Upload Photo
46 High Street, Greengate House				54°50′09″N 4°03′20″W	Category B	36538	Upload another image
62 High Street, Tolbooth Gallery And Steeple Close				54°50′07″N 4°03′20″W	Category B	36543	Upload Photo
94 High Street				54°50′06″N 4°03′16″W	Category B	36549	Upload Photo
100A, B And C High Street				54°50′06″N 4°03′15″W	Category C(S)	36551	Upload Photo
106 And 108 High Street				54°50′06″N 4°03′15″W	Category B	36553	Upload Photo
1 and 3 Castle Bank				54°50′14″N 4°03′13″W	Category B	36453	Upload another image
Millburn Street, Former Cornmill				54°50′19″N 4°02′44″W	Category B	36563	Upload Photo
19 Millburn Street				54°50′17″N 4°02′46″W	Category C(S)	36566	Upload Photo
17 And 19 St Cuthbert's Street				54°50′13″N 4°02′59″W	Category C(S)	36574	Upload Photo
St Cuthbert's Street, The Commercial Hotel				54°50′13″N 4°02′57″W	Category C(S)	36577	Upload Photo
4 And 6 St Cuthbert's Street				54°50′13″N 4°03′08″W	Category C(S)	36580	Upload Photo
1 St Mary's Place				54°50′05″N 4°03′06″W	Category C(S)	36594	Upload Photo
9, 11 And 13 St Mary's Street				54°50′10″N 4°02′59″W	Category B	36605	Upload Photo
19 And 21 St Mary's Street				54°50′11″N 4°02′58″W	Category B	36607	Upload Photo
53, 55 And 57 St Mary's Street				54°50′14″N 4°02′53″W	Category C(S)	36615	Upload Photo
St Mary's Street, Johnston's Free School				54°50′18″N 4°02′48″W	Category B	36617	Upload another image
7 Union Street				54°50′10″N 4°03′13″W	Category C(S)	36629	Upload Photo
26 Union Street				54°50′11″N 4°03′16″W	Category C(S)	36643	Upload Photo
37 Castle Street				54°50′08″N 4°03′12″W	Category B	36476	Upload Photo
49, 51 Castle Street				54°50′07″N 4°03′12″W	Category B	36480	Upload Photo
12 Castle Street				54°50′12″N 4°03′10″W	Category C(S)	36488	Upload Photo
37 High Street				54°50′10″N 4°03′17″W	Category C(S)	36509	Upload Photo
45 And 45A High Street				54°50′10″N 4°03′18″W	Category C(S)	36511	Upload Photo
67A And 67B High Street				54°50′08″N 4°03′19″W	Category C(S)	36514	Upload Photo
83 High Street				54°50′08″N 4°03′17″W	Category C(S)	36517	Upload Photo
High Street, Stewartry District Council Offices				54°50′06″N 4°03′09″W	Category B	36523	Upload another image
12 High Street, With 10 High Street, Broughton House And Walls To Castle Dykes				54°50′13″N 4°03′16″W	Category A	36530	Upload another image
96 And 98 High Street				54°50′06″N 4°03′16″W	Category B	36550	Upload Photo
104 High Street				54°50′06″N 4°03′15″W	Category B	36552	Upload Photo
1 Castle Street And 2 St Cuthbert's Close				54°50′12″N 4°03′08″W	Category C(S)	36460	Upload Photo
15 Castle Street				54°50′11″N 4°03′09″W	Category C(S)	36465	Upload Photo
21 St Cuthbert's Street				54°50′13″N 4°02′59″W	Category C(S)	36575	Upload Photo
28 And 30 St Cuthbert's Street				54°50′12″N 4°03′04″W	Category C(S)	36586	Upload Photo
40 And 40A St Cuthbert's Street				54°50′12″N 4°03′01″W	Category C(S)	36591	Upload Photo
50 St Cuthbert's Street				54°50′12″N 4°02′53″W	Category C(S)	36593	Upload Photo
17 St Mary's Place, Townend				54°50′05″N 4°03′03″W	Category C(S)	36596	Upload Photo
4 St Mary's Place				54°50′04″N 4°03′05″W	Category C(S)	36601	Upload Photo
St Mary's Street, Church Hall				54°50′08″N 4°03′02″W	Category C(S)	36603	Upload Photo
27 St Mary's Street				54°50′12″N 4°02′57″W	Category B	36609	Upload Photo
St Mary's Street, Atkinson's Place				54°50′21″N 4°02′47″W	Category C(S)	36618	Upload Photo
3 Union Street				54°50′09″N 4°03′13″W	Category C(S)	36628	Upload Photo
11 And 13 Union Street				54°50′10″N 4°03′14″W	Category C(S)	36631	Upload Photo
20 And 22 Union Street				54°50′10″N 4°03′15″W	Category C(S)	36641	Upload Photo
21 Castle Street				54°50′10″N 4°03′10″W	Category B	36468	Upload Photo
25 Castle Street				54°50′10″N 4°03′10″W	Category C(S)	36470	Upload Photo
29 Castle Street				54°50′09″N 4°03′11″W	Category C(S)	36472	Upload Photo
33 Castle Street				54°50′09″N 4°03′11″W	Category C(S)	36474	Upload Photo
53 Castle Street				54°50′07″N 4°03′13″W	Category B	36481	Upload Photo
57, 59 Castle Street				54°50′06″N 4°03′13″W	Category C(S)	36483	Upload Photo
6, 8 Castle Street				54°50′12″N 4°03′10″W	Category C(S)	36487	Upload Photo
11 Church Place				54°50′09″N 4°02′58″W	Category C(S)	36499	Upload Photo
57, 59 And 61 High Street				54°50′09″N 4°03′19″W	Category C(S)	36512	Upload Photo
44 High Street, Greengate Close				54°50′10″N 4°03′21″W	Category B	36537	Upload Photo
122 High Street				54°50′06″N 4°03′11″W	Category C(S)	36557	Upload Photo
Castlebank, Shorehouse				54°50′15″N 4°03′11″W	Category C(S)	36457	Upload Photo
Castle Mains				54°50′07″N 4°03′33″W	Category C(S)	36459	Upload Photo
9 And 11 Castle Street				54°50′11″N 4°03′09″W	Category B	36464	Upload Photo
Kirkcudbright Bridge				54°50′20″N 4°03′01″W	Category B	9712	Upload another image
St Cuthbert's Churchyard (Formerly Old Kirkyard), Including Boundary Wall				54°50′16″N 4°02′24″W	Category B	36567	Upload Photo
1 And 2 St Cuthbert's Place, The Steam Packet Inn				54°50′14″N 4°03′01″W	Category C(S)	36569	Upload Photo
27 St Cuthbert's Street				54°50′13″N 4°02′57″W	Category C(S)	36578	Upload Photo
36 St Cuthbert's Street				54°50′12″N 4°03′02″W	Category C(S)	36589	Upload Photo
15 And 17 St Mary's Street, Bank Of Scotland and Manager's House				54°50′11″N 4°02′58″W	Category B	36606	Upload Photo
29 And 31 St Mary's Street				54°50′12″N 4°02′57″W	Category B	36610	Upload Photo
St Mary's Street, Museum				54°50′07″N 4°03′06″W	Category C(S)	36620	Upload Photo
2 Union Street				54°50′10″N 4°03′12″W	Category B	36636	Upload Photo
24 Union Street				54°50′11″N 4°03′16″W	Category C(S)	36642	Upload Photo
2 Castle Street				54°50′12″N 4°03′10″W	Category B	36486	Upload Photo
34, 34A And 36 Castle Street				54°50′09″N 4°03′13″W	Category C(S)	36495	Upload Photo
50, 52 Castle Street				54°50′08″N 4°03′13″W	Category C(S)	36497	Upload Photo
High Street, Sheriff Court House And Public Library				54°50′07″N 4°03′16″W	Category C(S)	36518	Upload Photo
103 High Street				54°50′06″N 4°03′12″W	Category C(S)	36519	Upload Photo
34 High Street				54°50′10″N 4°03′18″W	Category C(S)	36535	Upload Photo
52 High Street				54°50′09″N 4°03′21″W	Category C(S)	36540	Upload Photo
118 High Street				54°50′06″N 4°03′12″W	Category B	36556	Upload Photo
142 High Street				54°50′05″N 4°03′09″W	Category C(S)	36561	Upload Photo
Castlebank, Harbour Cottage				54°50′15″N 4°03′11″W	Category C(S)	36455	Upload Photo
Ellenbank				54°50′59″N 4°02′22″W	Category B	9711	Upload Photo
Cannee Farm Steading				54°49′41″N 4°02′42″W	Category B	9713	Upload Photo
St Cuthbert's Street, Greyfriars Church (Episcopal Church)				54°50′14″N 4°03′09″W	Category B	36568	Upload Photo
11 And 13 St Cuthbert's Street				54°50′13″N 4°03′00″W	Category C(S)	36572	Upload Photo
15 St Cuthbert's Street				54°50′13″N 4°02′59″W	Category C(S)	36573	Upload Photo
2 St Cuthbert's Street				54°50′13″N 4°03′08″W	Category C(S)	36579	Upload Photo
St Cuthbert's Street Well				54°50′13″N 4°03′00″W	Category C(S)	36592	Upload Photo
2 St Mary's Place				54°50′04″N 4°03′05″W	Category B	36600	Upload Photo
47 St Mary's Street				54°50′14″N 4°02′54″W	Category C(S)	36612	Upload Photo
10 And 12 Union Street				54°50′10″N 4°03′13″W	Category B	36639	Upload Photo
30 Union Street				54°50′11″N 4°03′16″W	Category C(S)	36644	Upload Photo
Castle Street, Masonic Arms				54°50′10″N 4°03′10″W	Category B	36467	Upload Photo
23 Castle Street				54°50′10″N 4°03′10″W	Category B	36469	Upload Photo
24, 26 Castle Street				54°50′09″N 4°03′12″W	Category C(S)	36492	Upload Photo
63 High Street				54°50′08″N 4°03′19″W	Category C(S)	36513	Upload Photo
129 High Street				54°50′05″N 4°03′07″W	Category C(S)	36525	Upload Photo
14 And 14A High Street				54°50′12″N 4°03′17″W	Category B	36532	Upload Photo
84 High Street				54°50′06″N 4°03′17″W	Category B	36548	Upload another image
116 High Street, Gordon House Hotel				54°50′06″N 4°03′13″W	Category C(S)	36555	Upload Photo
134 And 136 High Street				54°50′05″N 4°03′10″W	Category C(S)	36558	Upload Photo
9 Millburn Street				54°50′18″N 4°02′45″W	Category C(S)	36564	Upload Photo
3 And 3A St Cuthbert's Street				54°50′13″N 4°03′01″W	Category C(S)	36570	Upload Photo
23 St Cuthbert's Street				54°50′13″N 4°02′58″W	Category C(S)	36576	Upload Photo
10 And 12 St Cuthbert's Street				54°50′13″N 4°03′07″W	Category C(S)	36582	Upload Photo
16 And 18 St Cuthbert's Street, Solway Tide				54°50′12″N 4°03′06″W	Category C(S)	36584	Upload Photo
32 And 32A St Cuthbert's Street				54°50′12″N 4°03′03″W	Category C(S)	36587	Upload Photo
19 St Mary's Place, Townend				54°50′02″N 4°03′02″W	Category C(S)	36597	Upload Photo
31 St Mary's Place, Townend				54°50′06″N 4°03′01″W	Category C(S)	36599	Upload Photo
St Mary's Street. Oakley And Wester Oakley				54°50′02″N 4°03′09″W	Category B	36619	Upload Photo
21 Union Street				54°50′10″N 4°03′15″W	Category C(S)	36633	Upload Photo
25 Union Street				54°50′10″N 4°03′16″W	Category C(S)	36635	Upload Photo
6 And 8 Union Street				54°50′10″N 4°03′13″W	Category C(S)	36638	Upload Photo
31 Castle Street				54°50′09″N 4°03′11″W	Category B	36473	Upload Photo
41, 43 Castle Street				54°50′07″N 4°03′12″W	Category B	36478	Upload Photo
47 Castle Street				54°50′07″N 4°03′12″W	Category C(S)	36479	Upload Photo
6 High Street				54°50′14″N 4°03′15″W	Category C(S)	36528	Upload Photo
36 High Street				54°50′10″N 4°03′19″W	Category B	36536	Upload Photo
48 And 48A High Street				54°50′09″N 4°03′20″W	Category B	36539	Upload Photo
Millburn Street, Millburn House				54°50′20″N 4°02′45″W	Category C(S)	36562	Upload Photo
7 Castle Street				54°50′12″N 4°03′09″W	Category B	36463	Upload Photo
17 Castle Street				54°50′11″N 4°03′09″W	Category C(S)	36466	Upload Photo

== Key ==
The scheme for classifying buildings in Scotland is:

- Category A: "buildings of national or international importance, either architectural or historic; or fine, little-altered examples of some particular period, style or building type."
- Category B: "buildings of regional or more than local importance; or major examples of some particular period, style or building type, which may have been altered."
- Category C: "buildings of local importance; lesser examples of any period, style, or building type, as originally constructed or moderately altered; and simple traditional buildings which group well with other listed buildings."

In March 2016 there were 47,288 listed buildings in Scotland. Of these, 8% were Category A, and 50% were Category B, with the remaining 42% being Category C.
