= Spring Fling =

Spring Fling can refer to:

- Spring Fling!, 1995 film
- "Spring Fling", 6teen episode
- "Spring Fling", Zoey 101 episode
- Spring Fling Open Studios, an event in Scotland
- "Spring Fling" — one of 1-vs-3 minigames in Mario Party 10.

== See also ==
- "Spring-a-Ding-Fling", Modern Family episode
- Spring Thing, an annual competition to highlight works of text adventure games and other literary works, also known as Interactive Fiction
