= Elspeth McEwen =

Convicted witch in Scotland (d. 1698)

- Died: 24 August 1698; Silver Craigs, Kirkcudbright, Kingdom of Scotland
- Cause of death: Execution
- Known for: Being burnt as a witch

Elspeth McEwen or McKewan or Elizabeth MacEwan (died 24 August 1698) of Balmaclellan was the most famous convicted witch in Galloway and the last to be burnt at the stake there.

== Accusations, imprisonment, torture, trial and execution ==
As an elderly educated woman (the 'old wife of Bogha') who lived alone, she was accused of tormenting her neighbours, for example by bewitching their poultry, causing hens, ducks or geese to stop (or increase) laying, fall ill or die. She supposedly kept a wooden pin hidden in her rafters, which she used to steal milk from any cow by first touching the udder with the pin. In 1696 she was summoned to the local church session on charges of witchcraft. Among the proofs of her guilt was the evidence that the minister's mare, on which she rode to the session, was terrorised and sweated drops of blood.

McEwen was then imprisoned for two years at the Kirkcudbright Tolbooth. During this time she was tortured to such a degree that she pleaded for the release of death. In March 1698 she was tried for the "horid cryme of witchcraft" and confessed to "a contract and regular commerce with the Devil, and of practising charms and other evil magical acts to the harm of the people". There are detailed records of her imprisonment and trial.

Dalry Kirk-Session, October 15th, 1697 — Given for alimenting Elspet M‘Koun, alledged of witchcraft in prison, £1 1s 0d.

Commission for Judging of Elspeth M‘Cowen and Mary Millar, alleadged Guilty of Witchcraft, 1698. — The Lords of his Majesties privie Councill, being informed that Elspeth M‘Cowen and Mary Millar, both within the Stewartry of Kirkcudbright, presently prisoners within the tolboth of Kirkcudbright, are alleaged guilty of the horid cryme of witchcraft, and hes committed severall malifices; and considering it will be a great deall of charges and expenses to bring the saids Elspeth M‘Cowen and Mary Millar to this place, in order to a tryall before the Lords commissioners of justiciary...

On 24 August 1698 she was taken to Silver Craigs in Kirkcudbright where she was strangled and then burnt at the stake. The expenses were carefully accounted:

Item given to the Proveist to give him the day of execution — £2 16s 0d
Item for peits to burn Elspet wt. — £1 4s 0d
Item for twa pecks of colls — £0 16s 0d
Item for towes, small and great — £0 4s 0d
Item for ane tarr barle to Andrew Aitken — £1 4s 0d
Item to Hugh Anderson for carrying of the peits and colls — £0 6s 0d
Item to William Kirk qn she was burning, ane pint of aill — £0 2s 0d
Item paid to Robert Creighton, conform to precept, viz., eight shill Scots for beating the drumm at Elspet M‘Queen’s funerall, and to James Carsson, his wife threeteen shillings drunken by Elspet’s executioner, at seall times — £1 1s 0d
