= Open studio event =

An open studio event is an event in which, for a limited time, artists and makers open their studios to the public. It can be thought of as a number of studios that are not normally an open studio, becoming open within a locality and within a time frame defined by the event.

Within the duration of the open studio event, during published opening hours, it is normal that anyone who wants to visit a studio can do so free of charge. Many of the artists taking part allow the public to access studios that are normally their own private workspace. Therefore, an open studio event can offer an unusual insight into the places and the ways in which artists work.

One of the first in the UK was Brighton Artists Open Houses, others include Spring Fling Open Studios in Scotland and Helfa gelf in Wales. There are now many events where artists open their studios to the public for a few days each year.
