= Kirkcudbright Town Hall =

Municipal building in Kirkcudbright, Scotland

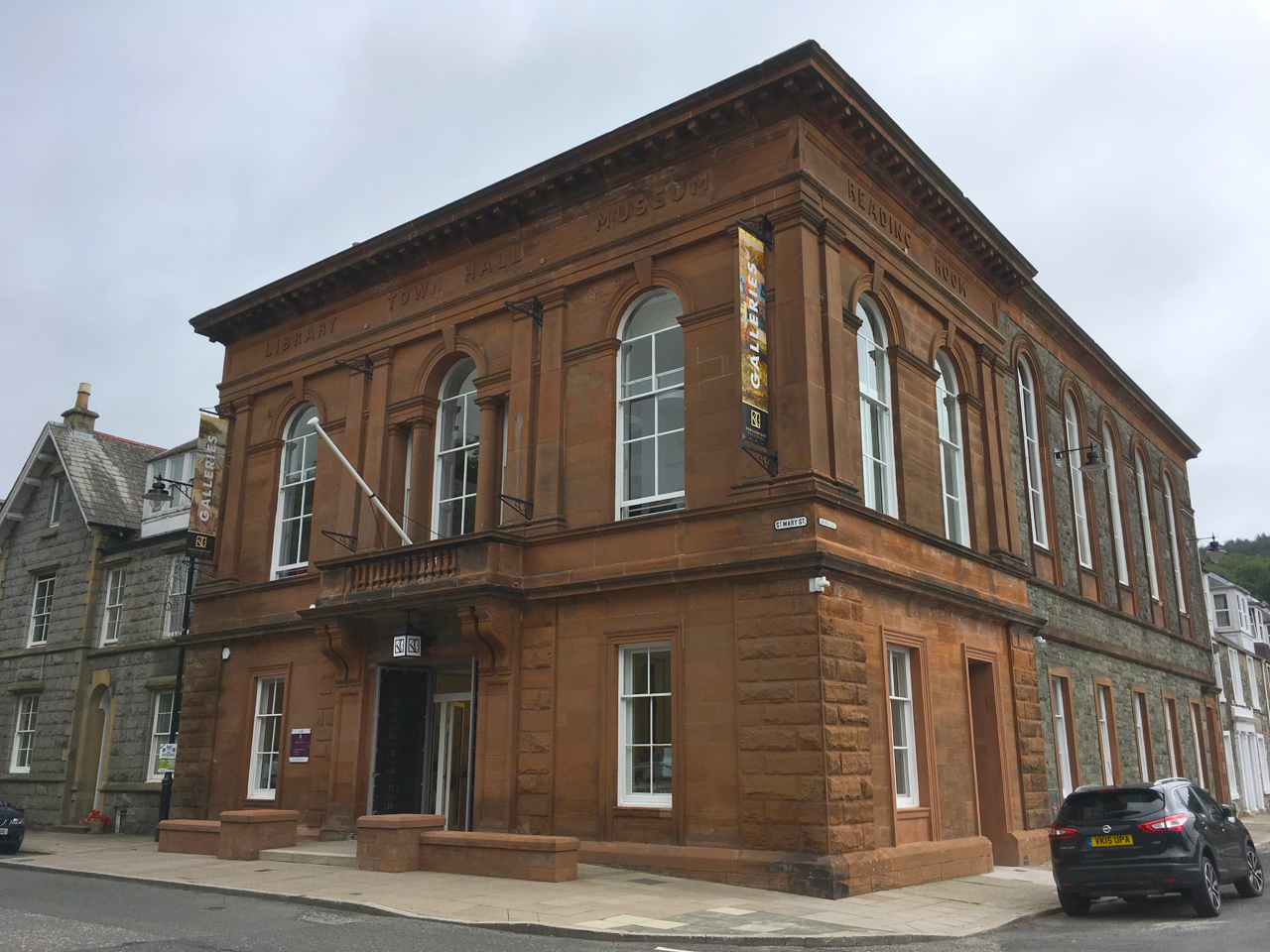
- Kirkcudbright Town Hall

- Shown in Dumfries and Galloway
- 54.8360°N 4.0500°W
- Location: St Mary's Street, Kirkcudbright

History
- Built: 1881

Site notes
- Architect(s): Peddie and Kinnear
- Architectural style: Neoclassical style

Listed Building – Category B
- Official name: St Mary's Street, Town Hall
- Designated: 28 May 1981
- Reference no.: LB36604

Kirkcudbright Town Hall, currently operating as Kirkcudbright Galleries, is a municipal building in St Mary's Street, Kirkcudbright, Scotland. The building, which was the headquarters of Kirkcudbright Burgh Council, is a Category B listed building.

== History ==
The first municipal building in the town was the Kirkcudbright Tolbooth which was completed in 1629. Like other tolbooths, Kirkcudbright Tolbooth had been primarily designed as a prison and, in 1859, the town clerk, William McLellan, and other burgh leaders started a campaign for new public rooms: the site they selected was open land on the east side of St Mary's Street. The new public rooms were erected in 1863 at a cost of £1,900 but within a few years the foundations were found to be unsafe and it became necessary to replace the building with a new structure.

The foundation stone for the new building was laid by the Lord Lieutenant of Kirkcudbright, the Earl of Selkirk, on 7 August 1878. It was designed by Peddie and Kinnear in the neoclassical style, built in red sandstone and was completed in 1881. The design involved a symmetrical main frontage with three bays facing onto St Mary's Street; the central bay featured a doorway on the ground floor flanked by pilasters and brackets supporting a balustraded stone balcony. There was a Venetian window on the first floor; the outer bays were fenestrated by square headed windows on the ground floor and by round headed windows on the first floor. The windows on the first floor were flanked by pairs of Doric order pilasters and, at roof level, there was an entablature inscribed with the words "Library", "Town Hall" and "Museum" and, above that, a modillioned cornice. Internally, the principal rooms were the council chamber, the reading room and the library on the ground floor, and the main assembly hall on the first floor.

The Stewartry Museum was established on the first floor of the town hall when it opened, but after the town hall became inadequate for the increasing size of the collection, the museum relocated to its current location further south along St Mary's Street in 1893. The Kirkcudbright Library and Scientific Institute, later simply known as Kirkcudbright Library, which was also established on the first floor of the town hall when it opened, remained there until the 1950s and then relocated to the Sherriff Court.

The building continued to serve as the headquarters of the burgh council for much of the 20th century, but ceased to be the local seat of government when the enlarged Stewartry District Council was formed at the council offices in the High Street in 1975. An extensive programme of works costing £3.1 million to convert the town hall into an art gallery under the name "Kirkcudbright Galleries" was completed in June 2018. While some rooms were identified for temporary exhibitions, the management also designated a room for a permanent display of works by local artists, known as the "Kirkcudbright Artists' Collection". The new gallery was officially opened by the Princess Royal on 12 July 2018.

== See also ==
- List of listed buildings in Kirkcudbright, Dumfries and Galloway
