= Helfa gelf =

Helfa Gelf (English: Arts Trail) was the Welsh-language name for the largest open studio event in north Wales, with more than 300 artists. However, it is now defunct. The annual art event was held every September starting in 2006, and extended over five counties of North Wales. The Art Trail combined over 100 artists Open Studios and Artists Open Houses with events located all kinds of venues: studios, galleries, village halls and even garden sheds.

Although it was an independent body, it sought much external sponsorship, and was organised in co-operation with many bodies including county councils, the Arts Council of Wales, Betsi Cadwaladr University Health Board, Anglesey Arts Forum, Royal Cambrian Academy, Oriel Plas Glyn Y Weddw, Bodelwyddan Castle, Gwynedd Economic Partnership, Menter Môn and Cadwyn Clwyd.
