= Kirkcudbright war memorial =

War memorial in Kirkcudbright, Scotland

- United Kingdom
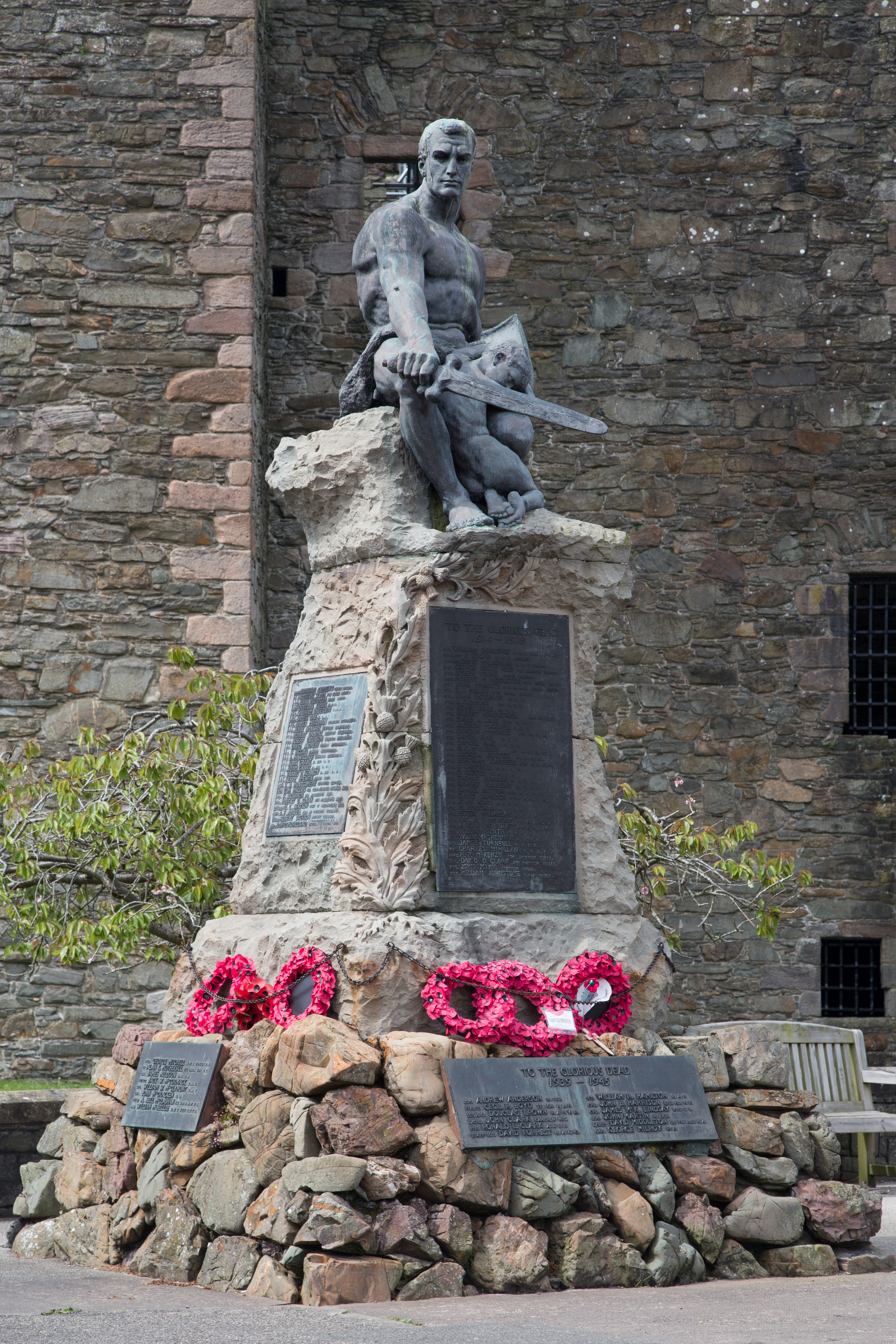
- For men of the town killed in the two world wars
- Unveiled: 14 April 1921; 103 years ago
- Location: 54°50′12.9″N 4°03′09.5″W; Kirkcudbright
- Designed by: George Henry Paulin

Listed Building – Category C(S)
- Official name: War Memorial, Castle Street, Kirkcudbright
- Designated: 28 May 1981
- Reference no.: LB36485

Kirkcudbright war memorial commemorates the men of the Scottish town of Kirkcudbright killed during the First and Second World Wars. It is situated in front of the 16th-century MacLellan's Castle and shows a seated warrior with sword and shield with a sleeping child on his knee. The memorial was designed by George Henry Paulin and erected in 1921 to commemorate the men lost during the First World War. Additional plaques were added following the Second World War.

== Description ==
The memorial stands in front of the 16th-century MacLellan's Castle. It was sculpted by George Henry Paulin of Edinburgh, who had been recommended by the Glasgow School artist Edward Atkinson Hornel, who had strong connections to Kirkcudbright.

The memorial consists of a plinth made from stones taken from the seashore. The plinth is carved with thistle emblems. On top of the plinth is a bronze statue of a half-naked warrior armed with a sword and shield. The warrior is seated, but alert, and has a child asleep on his knee. The plinth holds three large and one small plaques listing the 96 men of the town who died during the First World War.

The statue was cast in bronze at the McDonald and Creswick foundry in Edinburgh. The memorial was unveiled 14 April 1921 by Colonel Robert Francis Dudgeon, the Lord-Lieutenant of Kirkcudbrightshire, and dedicated by Reverend W. Barclay. Contemporary reports note that the unveiling was attended by an 87-year-old veteran of the Crimean War, Robert Kissock Cameron.

After the Second World War, an additional three plaques were added to the memorial, listing the 28 local men killed in that war. The memorial was granted statutory protection as a category C listed building on 28 May 1981.

== Gallery ==
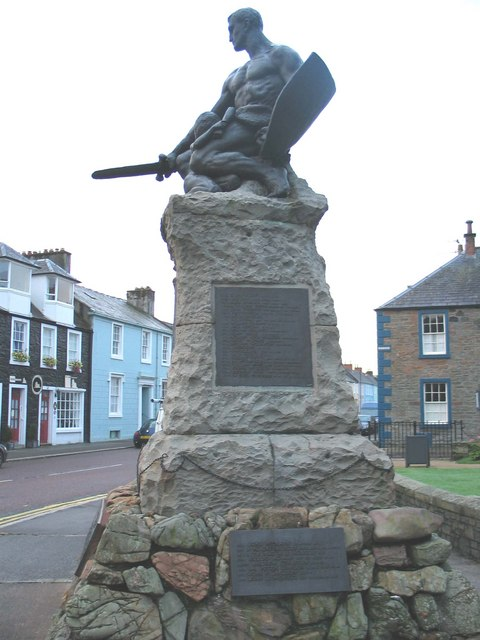
Left profile

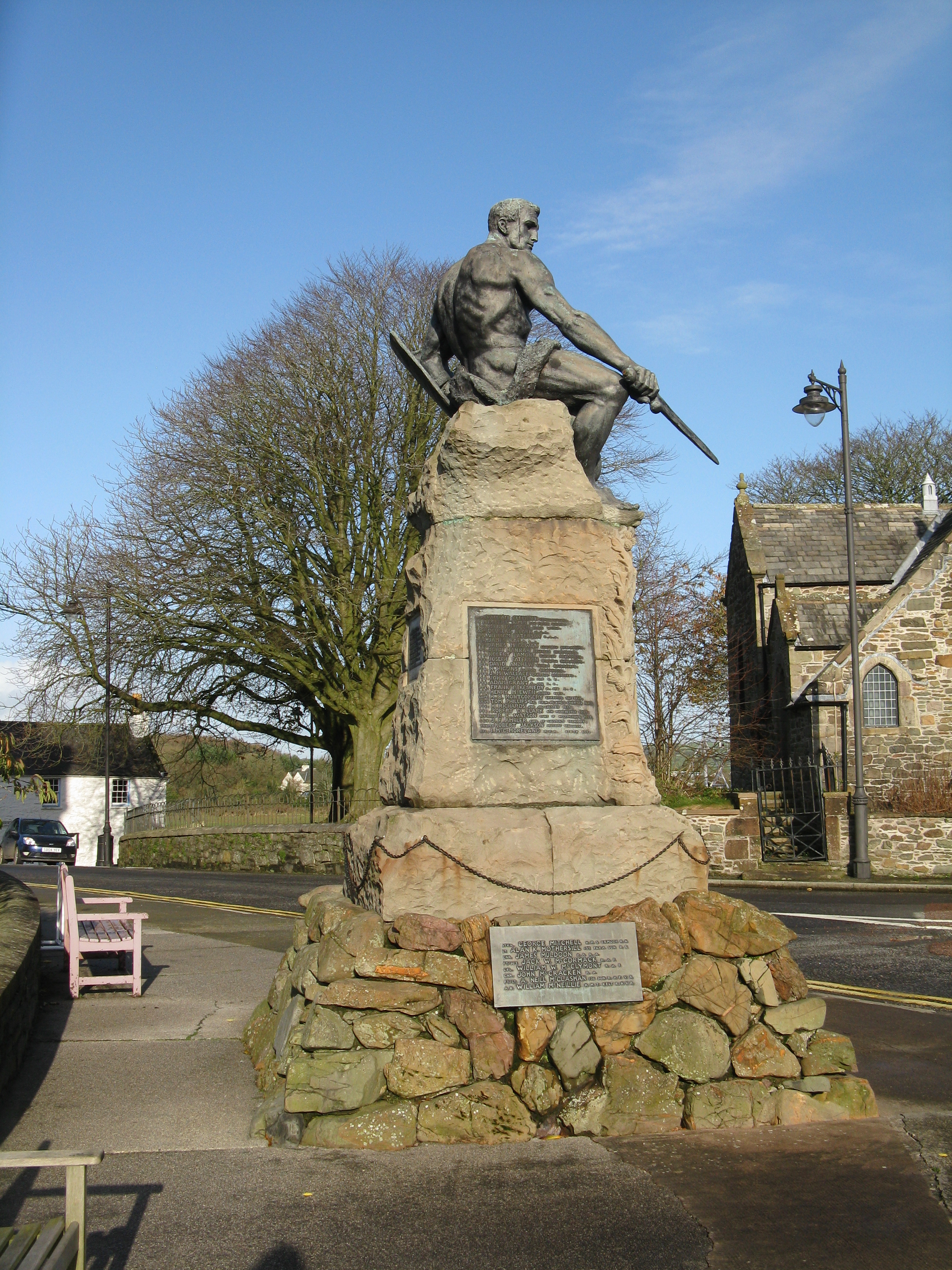
Right profile

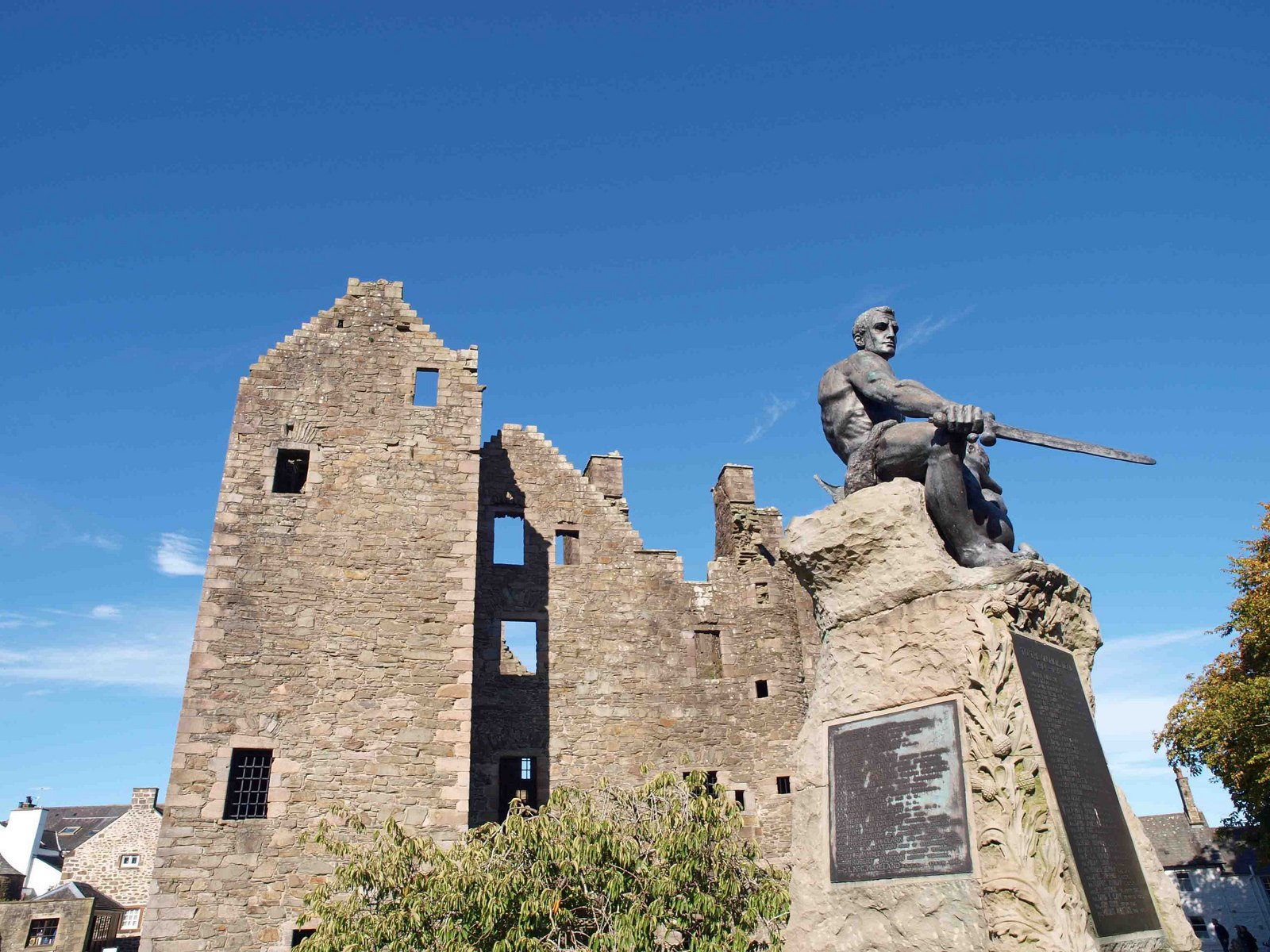
In context with the castle
