= Open studio =

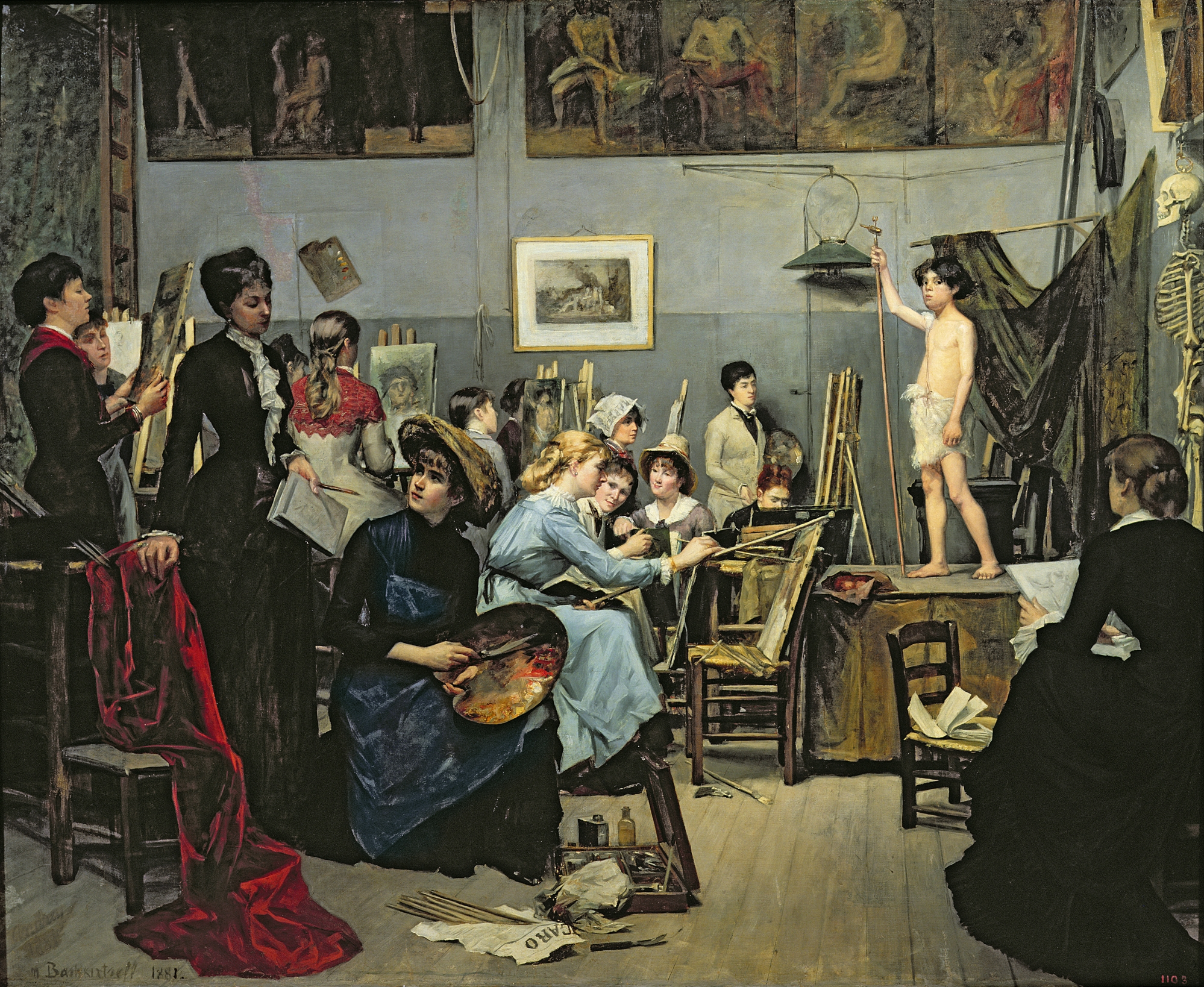
Marie Bashkirtseff. In the Studio. 1881

A studio or workroom which is made accessible to allcomers, perhaps just in the short term, during an open studio event, where artistic or creative work can be viewed and created collaboratively. An open studio is intended to foster creativity and encourage experimentation in an atmosphere of cultural exchange, conversation, encouragement, and freedom of expression.

== History ==
In the modern era, open studios originated in the salons of 17th Century Paris, such as the Hôtel de Rambouillet and the gatherings of intellectuals and artists hosted by Madame de Scudéry. Much later, during the 1950s, 1960s, and 1970s, the concept of the open studio took the form of public poetry exchanges (most notably those of the Beat poets, events that were the forerunners of modern poetry slams), the ‘happenings’ of Andy Warhol’s The Factory (culminating in the multimedia open-floor parties known as the Exploding Plastic Inevitable), and the experimental jamborees of the French literary group OuLiPo.

In the 21st century, the open studio (often taking the form of a virtual or internet location) focuses on the creative act of making and sharing, in a flexible space equipped with a range of contemporary media and multimedia. Artists and non-artists come together in a social act of collaboration, the only entry requirements being an inquisitive nature, a curiosity about new and traditional media, and a lack of inhibition about creating in a semi-public space.

== Modern day ==
A modern-day open studio blurs the boundaries between theory and practice, sparking insights and enabling the discovery of new kinds of meaning. It allows for greater freedom of thought and expression. Its ultimate aim is to pioneer fresh modes of communication and sharing, and produce innovative forms of public engagement.

An internationally recognised event, there a number of countries running its own version of open studios. These include UK, such as Helfa gelf in North Wales, Cyprus, Holland, Germany and America, to name but a few.

=== Open Studios Communications ===
Open Studios Communications is a network and communications platform set up to promote the open studio style events in the UK and Internationally, and to facilitate the exchange of ideas and information with the rest of the world. The website offers multiple search options on date, location, type of event and organisation.

=== Open studios cyprus ===
There has been a number of events in Cyprus under the open studios banner, including the event in Nicosia and Paphos. Both have run independently of one another, with different organisation and structure.

==== Nicosia Open Studios ====
First run in November 2006 inside the city wall of Nicosia, Open Studios presented the opportunity for visitors to visit and see artists work from both sides of the divide. This event typically runs once every two years.

Events were also run in 2008 and 2011.

==== Paphos & Limassol Open Studios ====
This event originally started as Paphos Open Studios in 2006, and primarily consisted of UK Artists living in Cyprus. However it expanded to include the Limassol region and so becoming a truly international affair with artist participating from a variety of countries and cultures. It is an annual event. The purpose of this event is to present the opportunity to the general public to meet and discuss the work of the artist in an informal and relaxed environment.

Taking place during selected weekends in October, the event is launched with an Opening Art Exhibition in Paphos, presenting the opportunity for visitors to view the artists work and to meet some of the artists. Information about the participating artists, their discipline, location and opening weekends can be found in the Artist Information Guide or on-line. This information helps the visitor plan and manage their itinerary for the event, and is typical of most Open Studio Events.

Open Studios is endorsed by the Cyprus Department of Education & Culture, Cultural Services, the Cyprus Tourist Organization and UNWTO

In 2011, the organisers of Paphos & Limassol Open Studios announced that this event would no longer exist in its current form and would go into hibernation. The event has just been relaunched under 'new management' in 2015 - www.cyprusopenstudios.com is under construction.

2011 Participating Artists were,

- Gabriele Boehm
- Mary Louise Chojnowski
- Judith Constantinou
- Elena Daniel
- Alessandra Desole
- Philip Duerdoth
- Anne & Keith Empson
- Helena Georgiades
- Scholi-Mouseion Haraktikis Hambis
- Paul Hughes
- Gillian Keef
- Joep Klinkenbijl
- Jady Kozak
- Jenny Loizides
- Sarah Beale Mary Nottingham
- Gemma Plant
- Natasha Sabeva
- Victor Smith
- Carole Stoate
- Sharen Taylor
- Jane Webster
- Karen Wroe
