= Stewartry Museum =

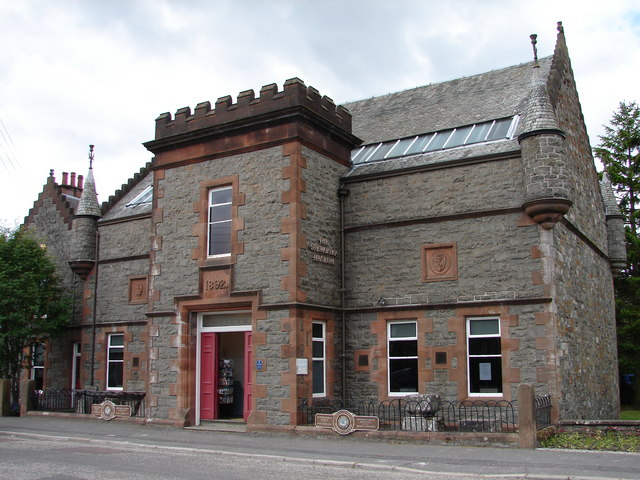
- Established: 1879
- Location: St Mary Street; Kirkcudbright; Scotland; DG6 4AQ
- Coordinates: 54°50′07″N 04°03′06″W
- Type: Local museum
- Website: https://www.futuremuseum.co.uk/about/partner-museums/a-z-list-of-partners/the-stewartry-museum.aspx

The Stewartry Museum is a local museum in Kirkcudbright, Scotland, which covers the history of this part of Galloway.

== History ==
The museum was originally founded in 1879 and housed on the top floor of Kirkcudbright Town Hall. The museum moved to its current building designed by architect Robert Wallace, in 1893 due to the increasing size of the museum collection. The museum was maintained by the Stewartry Museum Association until 1990 when control of both the museum and the building passed to Stewartry District Council. After the Scottish councils were reorganised in 1996, management of the museum was passed to Dumfries and Galloway Council.

== Collection ==
Collections chiefly relate to the human and natural history of the Stewartry, also known as Kirkcudbrightshire. The museum, and the companion art venue Kirkcudbright Galleries, house two nationally Recognised Collections of art and archaeology. The museum houses one of the oldest surviving sports trophies in the United Kingdom called the Siller Cup. Objects illustrative of the folklore, traditional crafts, and agricultural life of the area are also displayed here. Archaeological collections include significant Mesolithic and Neolithic holdings of barbed arrow heads, axe heads and other material from the Early Medieval and later periods - including Viking weaponry. The Museum is a recipient of finds from the Treasure Trove scheme. The Stewartry also houses a significant archive relating to local, family, civic, and social history, including early modern Borough Records with references to numerous witch-trials and attendant incarcerations in Kirkcudbright Tolbooth. The numerous bygones and natural history specimens from local fresh and saltwater habits are a well loved aspect of the museum.

In 2015 the museum put a lens from Little Ross lighthouse on display for the first time. It was made in Paris by the French company, Barbier, Benard, et Turenne in 1896 and was used by the lighthouse until 1960. It was donated to the museum by the Northern Lighthouse Board in 2004.

The museum also has casts made from rock art carvings at High Banks Farm which has several groups of cup and ring marks. The collection also has slabs with cup and ring marks from Blackmyre and Laggan.
