= Spring Fling Open Studios =

Spring Fling Open Studios (also known as Spring Fling) is an open studio event based in Dumfries and Galloway, Scotland.

Every Spring since 2003, 70 - 100 selected artists, makers and designers across the region open their studios for visitors to visit, speak with the artists and purchase contemporary artwork and design. It is the most successful event of its kind in Scotland.

Spring Fling develops new and creative projects for each year's main event as well as manages a year-round programme of workshops, talks and networking events.

The next Spring Fling will take place 23–25 May 2020 with almost 90 artists and makers taking part. Some studios will be open on the evening of Friday 22 May.

== The Main Event ==
Since 2003, Spring Fling has grown from a small local event initialled by the Dumfries and Galloway council's arts team to a well-recognised, artist-run premier contemporary art and craft event in Scotland.

70 - 100 artists and makers, either locally based or with connections to the region, will open their actual studio or set up temporary studio spaces to welcome thousands of visitors. Spring Fling is well known for its wide range of artists from established and internationally known artists to new graduates and fresh starters; this has brought a varied audience to the event. During the 2012 event alone, there were over 10,000 visitors to Spring Fling studios and in 2013, it was estimated that Spring Fling brought almost £1million to the local economy.

== Spring Fling / Wigtown Book Festival Residency ==
Spring Fling started its residency programme with the WASPS artist studios in Kirkcudbright in 2009 and has been running a residency programme with the Wigtown Book Festival since 2010.

Each year, an artist is selected to be the residency artist at Wigtown Book Festival in Autumn and at Spring Fling in Spring the following year. Artist Astrid Jaekel was the artist-in-residence at the Wigtown Book Festival in September/October 2013 and will be a participating artist at Spring Fling 2014 in May.
