= Kirkcudbright Tolbooth =

Historic municipal building in Scotland

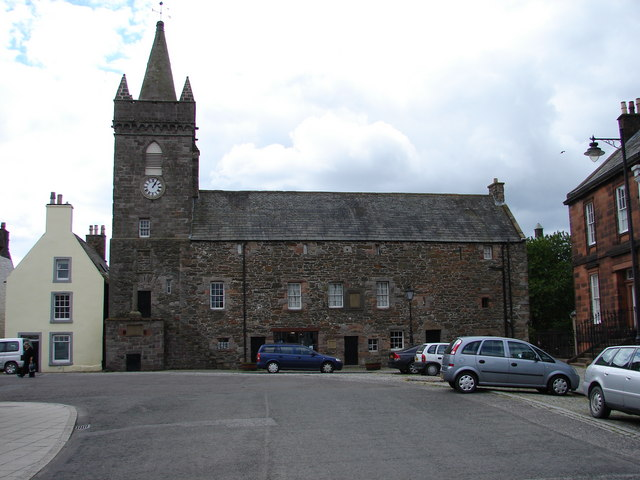

- Location of the tolbooth within Dumfries and Galloway
- 54°50′08″N 4°03′21″W
- Type: Tolbooth
- Location: Kirkcudbright, Dumfries and Galloway

History
- Built: 1627–1629
- Built for: Kirkcudbright Town Council

Listed Building – Category A
- Designated: 1971
- Reference no.: LB36542

Kirkcudbright Tolbooth is a historic municipal building in Kirkcudbright in Kirkcudbrightshire in the administrative area of Dumfries and Galloway, Scotland. Built between 1627 and 1629 to serve the town as a centre of commercial administration, a meeting place for the council, and a prison, it was used for all these roles until the late eighteenth century when the council moved much of its business to new, larger premises they had constructed across the street; the tolbooth remained in use as a prison until the early nineteenth century, after which it remained in council ownership and was put to a variety of uses.

Amongst the people incarcerated in the tolbooth during its use as a prison were people accused of witchcraft, and as late as 1805 it was used to imprison a woman convicted of pretending to be a witch. It was also used to imprison Covenanters during the Killing Time of 1679–1688; in 1684 a crowd stormed the building, killing a guard and freeing the Covenanters held within. American naval hero John Paul Jones was held in the tolbooth in 1770, following his arrest on suspicion of homicide after a sailor under his command died following a flogging Jones had ordered.

Kirkcudbright Tolbooth was designated a Category A listed building in 1971. It was renovated in the 1990s, and is currently used as a visitor centre and art gallery.

== Original function ==
In Scottish towns from the medieval period to the nineteenth century, tolbooths were the centre of local government and law enforcement. From the twelfth century, royal burghs were allowed to hold markets and conduct international trade, and to levy tolls and customs on these commercial activities; the word tolbooth derives from the role the buildings played as the centre of that commercial administration. Their most important functions were as a place for councils and courts to convene, for ceremonial civic functions, and as prisons for debtors and criminals. They usually had bells, which were used to mark the start of the working day, of curfew, and of public events, and from the seventeenth century it was obligatory for them to house a clock; the steeple of the tolbooth's clock tower was considered a mark of civic pride, and of the authority of the council.

From the seventeenth century onwards the word became increasingly synonymous with 'prison', and from the eighteenth century town councils started to erect larger and more commodious buildings, known as town houses or council houses, from which to conduct council business, while maintaining the tolhouse as a place of incarceration.

== Description ==
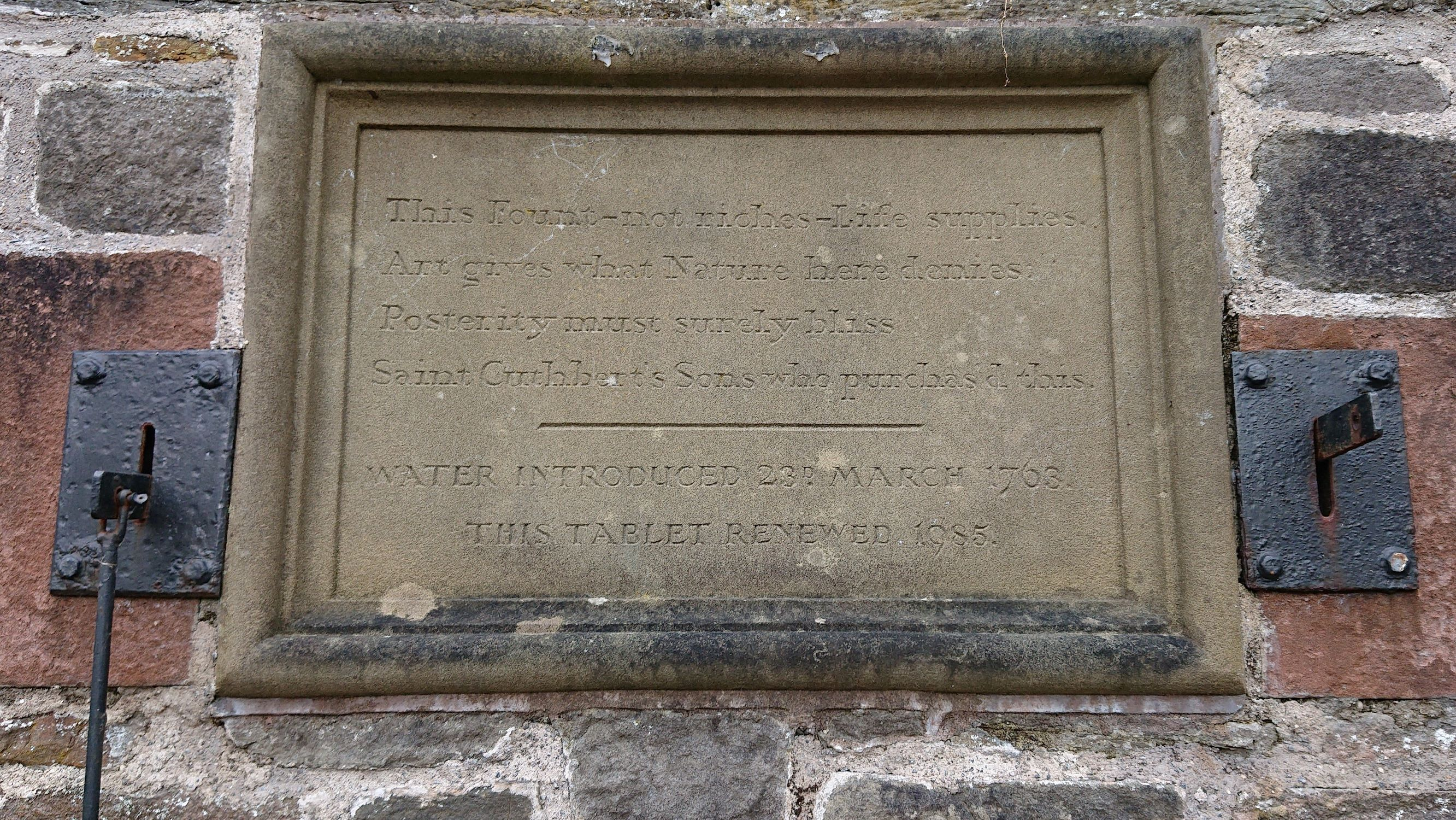
The water pump's commemorative plaque

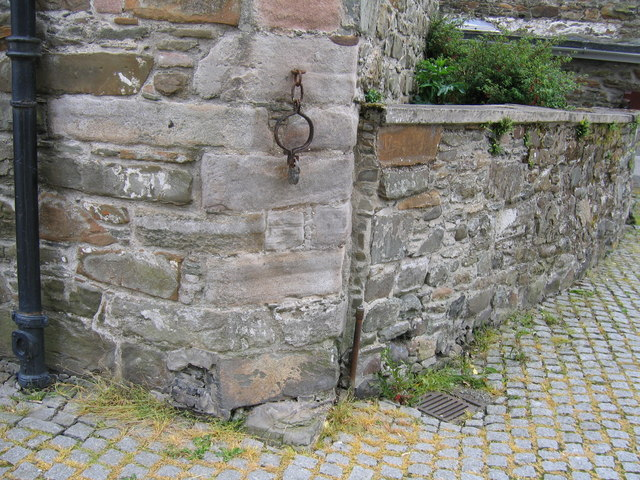
The jougs at the north-west corner of the tolbooth

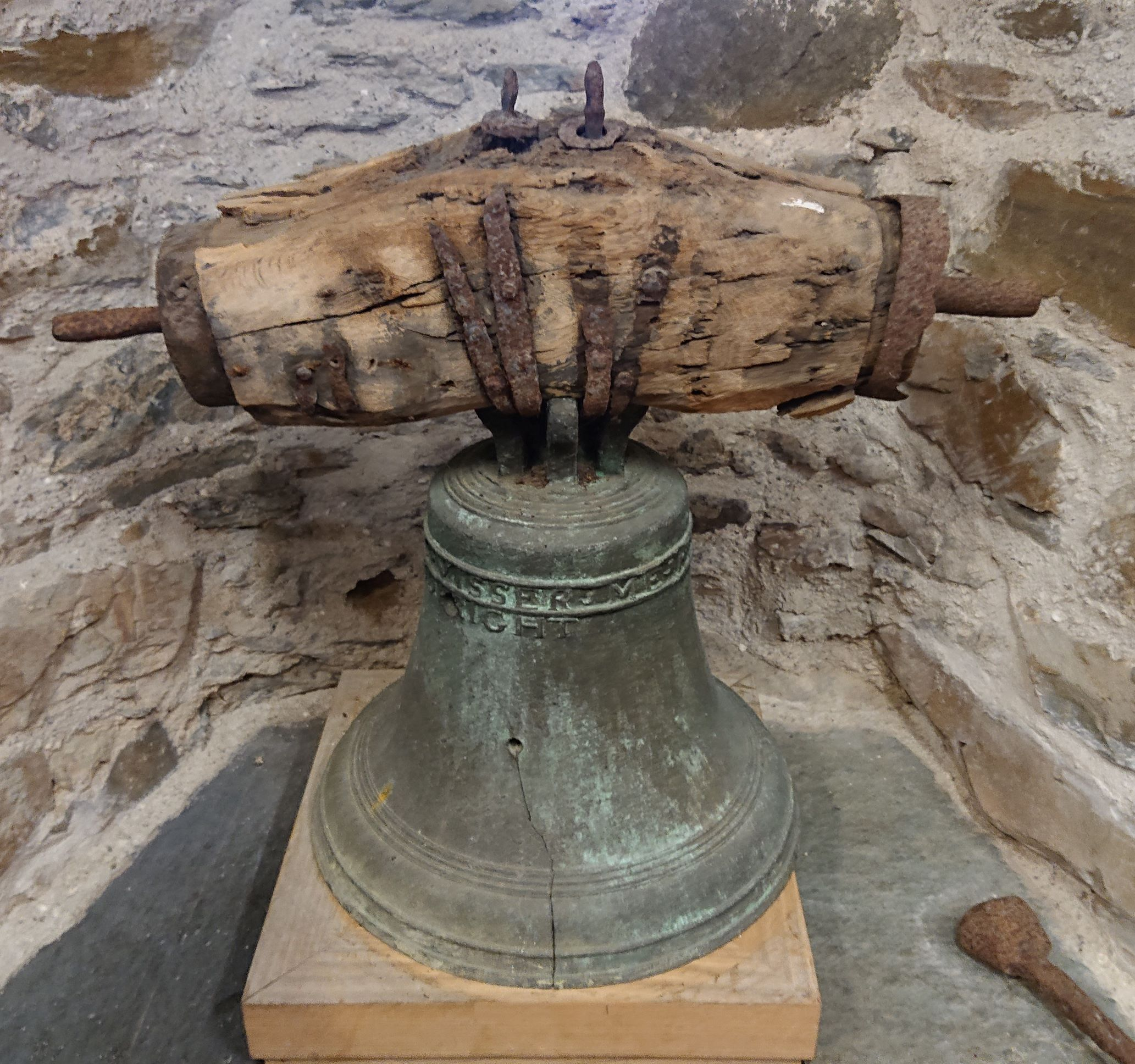
Quirfn de Visser's 1724 bell

Kirkcudbright Tolbooth is a large building, somewhat church-like in appearance, at the corner of Kirkcudbright's right-angled High Street. It has a long, three-storey block running roughly east-west, measuring 22.1 metres (73 ft) by 6.6 metres (22 ft), with a square tower at the east end. The main block and the lower portion of the tower, which would originally have been harled, are made of rubble with red sandstone dressings. The upper stages of the tower, which bear a nineteenth-century clockface, are of ashlar, and are surmounted by a corbeled parapet which is drained by stone spouts. There are obelisks on each of the corners of the parapet, and in the centre is a conical stone spire topped by a boat-shaped weathervane.

Beneath the tower on the north face of the building is an ashlar forestair (an outside stair at the front of the building), added in the 18th century and blocking a door to the prison at the base of the tower. The town's mercat cross now stands on the landing of the forestair; it has a carved base, a 1.95-metre (6.4 ft) chamfered stone shaft, and a triangular finial carved with the date 1610 and the initials EME. At the base of the forestair is a well, with lead spouts and a bolection moulded frame with an inscription which reads:

THIS FOUNT – NOT RICHES – LIFE SUPPLIES,

ART GIVES WHAT NATURE HERE DENIES;

POSTERITY MUST SURELY BLESS

SAINT CUTHBERT'S SONS WHO PURCHAS'D THIS.

WATER INTRODUCED 23D MARCH 1763.

Attached to the wall of the tolbooth are two surviving sets of iron jougs, one at the north-west corner of the building about 1.5 metres (4.9 ft) above the level of the street, and one at the top of the forestair. Secured around the neck, these were used to restrain and publicly shame people convicted of misdemeanours.

Hanging within the steeple are two bells. The principal bell, cast in the Netherlands in 1646, measures 52 centimetres (20 in) in height and 61 centimetres (24 in) in diameter, and carries the inscription "SOLI DEO GLORIA MICHAEL BVRGERHVYS ME FECIT ANNO 1646" (Glory to God alone. Michael Burgerhuys made me in the year 1646). The smaller bell in the steeple was made in London in 1841 by Thomas Mears. A third bell, known as 'the toun's litle bell', is displayed within the tolbooth. It measures 34 centimetres (13 in) in height and 44 centimetres (17 in) in diameter, and was cast in Rotterdam. It is inscribed with "QUIRIN DE VISSER ME FECIT 1724" (Quirin[ius] de Visser made me, 1724). There is also a clock, which was installed in 1897; the tower's original clock, of a single-hand design and probably made in the Netherlands prior to 1580, is on display in the nearby Stewartry Museum.

The interior features of the building are mostly modern; even before its refurbishment in the 1990s, most of the internal partitions were modern, probably due to rearrangements due to frequent changes in the building's use in the 19th and 20th centuries. It is now used as an art gallery and visitor centre: most of the upper part of the building is gallery space, with a small reception area and a gift shop and café on the ground floor.

== History ==
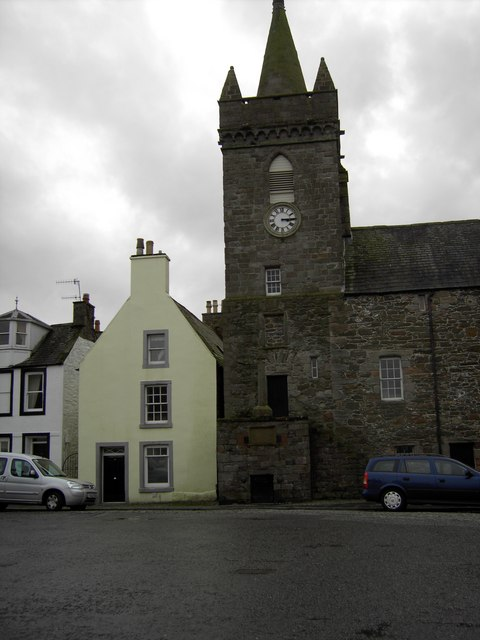
The tower, forestair and the mercat cross

At least two buildings served as the tolbooth for the royal burgh of Kirkcudbright prior to the construction of the surviving building. The whereabouts of the original medieval tolbooth are uncertain; the site and its building materials were sold by the burgh council a few years after they acquired a former church to replace it in 1570. The church, which stood a short distance to the east of the current building, was converted for use as a tolbooth and maintained, but by 1625 the councilors were complaining about the condition of the building, and declared their intention to construct a new building that would serve the needs of the town. Funds were raised from local landowners, by giving over a portion of the fines collected by local magistrates to the council, and by selling rights to the booths that would be available in the new building; Sir John Gordon of Lochinvar also provided a loan of £2000. Construction began in 1627, and the building was completed in 1629.

The converted church initially continued to house the town's clock and bell, but in 1642 the council declared "the necessity of ane steple and bellhouse to keep their knok (clock) and bell quhilk (which) is a special ornament belonging to every burgh, and which they are bound by the ancient laws of this kingdom to maintain and uphold". A tax was raised to pay for construction, and work started on the new tower, which by 1644 was ready to receive the bell and clock from the church; the church's bell would shortly afterwards be replaced by the 1646 bell currently hanging in the steeple.

In the years that followed, numerous repairs, alterations and extensions were made to the building. Extensive repairs were needed in the 1720s after a fire broke out in the steeple, and the forestair was added in 1742. Further repairs to the roof were needed in the 1740s and 1750s. In 1763, the forestair was modified to accommodate a fresh water pump. By the later eighteenth century the council decided that a larger building was needed, since the tolbooth had no storage space for records, and the council chambers were too small for county meetings and elections; it was decided to build a new town house, on the other side of the high street. This was completed in 1788, and the council offices and courthouse were moved over to the new building, but the tolbooth remained in use as a prison. It also continued to be used for some time to host public events; when a memorial stone was being laid to mark the construction of new public buildings in the town in 1878, a local dignitary commented:

Of old, balls and concerts took place in the highest room of the Old Tolbooth, now occupied by the Rifle Company; and I have conversed with persons who told me that they had frequently tripped 'the light fantastic toe' there, over the heads of the miserable debtors and criminals in the prison below. How the ladies dressed out in all their feathers and war paint, with hoops or trains made the ascent of the horrid stairs, I know not...

In the early nineteenth century, the tolbooth had four cells: two for debtors, and two for criminals. Between 1815 and 1816, a new block with seventeen cells was built adjoining the new courthouse at 85 High Street, making the tolbooth redundant as a prison. The new courthouse was itself rebuilt in 1868, and was succeeded by the County Buildings, which became the meeting place for the newly formed Kirkcudbrightshire County Council in 1890.

The town council retained ownership of the tolbooth, and the town's mercat cross was moved to the top of the forestair. Over the course of the nineteenth and twentieth centuries the building was put to a number of different purposes, including a coastguard station, offices for a volunteer rifle company and, for a time, a glove factory.

In 1971 the tolbooth, along with the fountain in its forestair and the mercat cross, were designated a Category A listed building. In 1993 it was renovated by the council, and re-opened by Queen Elizabeth II as an art centre.

== Notable prisoners ==
=== Witchcraft ===
Kirkcudbright Tolbooth was used at several times in its history to imprison people convicted of practising witchcraft or, in later years, of pretending to do so.

In the summer of 1671, five women were accused of casting charms on animals and of attempting to cure children and adults using witchcraft. Bessie Paine, Janet Hewat, Grissall McNae (or Rae), Margaret McGuffok and Margaret Fleming were arrested in Dumfries, bound, and transported to Kirkcudbright to be imprisoned in the "dark dungeon" of the tolbooth. They were held in "a most miserable conditione being alwayes at the point of starving having nothing of ther own nor nothing allowed them for ther sustenance", and in the winter of that year Paine died "through cold, hunger [and] other inconveniences of the prison". The other women were found to have been "maliciously misrepresented as guiltie of the most horrid crymes", and were released in the summer of 1672.

Elspeth McEwen, from Balmaclellan, also known as the 'old wife of Bogha', was imprisoned in the tolbooth from 1696 to 1698, accused of bewitching animals. The harsh conditions during her incarceration eventually led her to wish to die, and she confessed to the crimes; she was executed and burned on 24 August 1698.

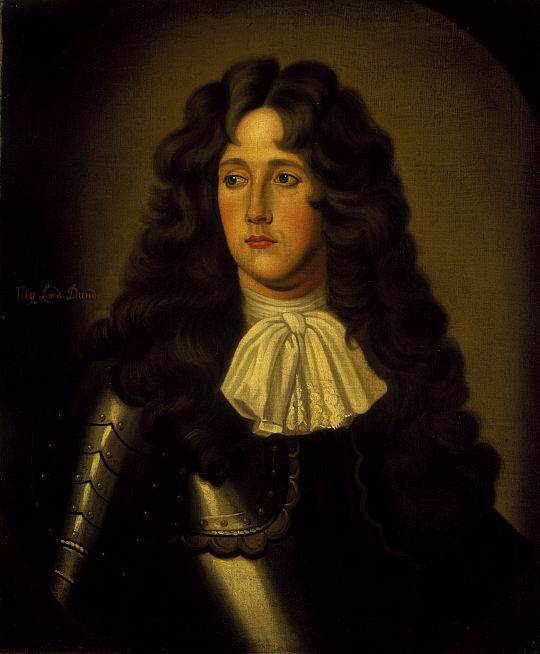
John Graham of Claverhouse who pursued the Covenanters responsible for attacking the tolbooth

By 1735, lawmakers had come around to the idea that the practice of witchcraft, as traditionally understood, was not a real-world possibility. As such, the 1735 Witchcraft Act was introduced in both England and Scotland, making it impossible to apply penalties to someone for actually practising witchcraft, but allowing for people to be convicted for the pretence of witchcraft; penalties could be applied to people who gained financially by claiming to have supernatural powers. Those who still believed that witchcraft was a real threat had no option but to prosecute those whom they suspected of practising it under this new law. In 1805 Jean Maxwell, who was believed by her community to be a witch, was sentenced to a year's incarceration at the Kirkcudbright Tolbooth for "pretending to exercise witchcraft, sorcery, inchantment, conjuration, &c."

=== Covenanters ===
The tolbooth was used to imprison a number of Covenanters in the period after the 1660 Restoration of Charles II, when adherence to the Covenant was abandoned by the Church of Scotland and outlawed. John Neilson of Corsock was held at the tolbooth, having been arrested for allowing ministers loyal to the Covenant to preach in his house. He was fined 2,000 pounds Scots and released, but was later captured at the Battle of Rullion Green and hanged at Edinburgh.

In late 1684, during the Killing Time of 1679–1688, a band of over 100 Covenanters mounted a raid on the tolbooth, and successfully freed some of their brethren; the attack resulted in the death of one of the tolbooth's guards, and John Graham of Claverhouse pursued the attackers. In an engagement at Auchencloy several days afterwards, Graham captured a number of people including William Hunter and Robert Smith, who were taken to the tolbooth and held there until their trial and execution.

=== John Paul Jones ===
John Paul Jones, who would go on to become a hero of the American Revolutionary War, was charged in 1770 over the death of a ship's carpenter, Mungo Maxwell. Jones had ordered Maxwell flogged while they were both serving on the brig John. He later died of yellow fever while serving on another ship, the Barcelona Packet, and Maxwell's father complained that the wounds from the flogging had contributed to his death. Jones was arrested and incarcerated at Kirkcudbright Tolbooth. He was freed on bail, and ultimately acquitted when testimony from the master of the Barcelona Packet indicated that Maxwell had been in good health when he joined its crew.

== In art and literature ==
Kirkcudbright Tolbooth has been the subject of paintings by a number of notable artists. Examples include William Hanna Clarke's painting 'The Tolbooth, Kirkcudbright', which is in the collection of the Kelvingrove Art Gallery and Museum, and William Stewart MacGeorge's painting of the same name, which is held by the Gracefield Arts Centre in Dumfries.

The building is believed to have been Walter Scott's model for the dungeon of Freeport, featured in his novel Guy Mannering.

== Sources ==
- "1770 Extract of Warrant for the arrest of John Paul (Jones)". Scottish Archive Network.
- "Artwork by William Hanna Clarke". Kirkcudbright Galleries.
- "Artwork by William Stewart MacGeorge". Kirkcudbright Galleries.
- Devereux, David F. (2009). "The Lochenkit Moor Covenanters – A Newly Discovered Account of a 'Killing Times' Incident" (PDF). Transactions of the Dumfriesshire and Galloway Natural History and Antiquarian Society. 83: 229–231. ISSN 0141-1292. Archived from the original (PDF) on 16 May 2022.
- Devereux, David F. (2019). "Community Development in Kirkcudbright". In Cowan, Edward J.; Veitch, Kenneth (eds.). Dumfries and Galloway: People and Place c. 1700–1914. Edinburgh: John Donald. ISBN 978-1-910900-12-3.
- Gibson, Marion (2006), "Witchcraft in the Courts", in Gibson, Marion (ed.), Witchcraft And Society in England And America, 1550–1750, Ithaca, New York: Cornell University Press, pp. 1–9, ISBN 978-0-8264-8300-3
- Gifford, John (1996). The Buildings of Scotland:Dumfries and Galloway. London: Penguin. ISBN 0140-71067-1.
- Glendinning, Miles; MacInnes, Ranald; MacKechnie, Aonghus (1996). A History of Scottish Architecture from the Renaissance to the Present Day. Edinburgh: Edinburgh University Press. ISBN 9-780748-608492.
- Henderson, Lizanne (2006). "The survival of witchcraft prosecutions and witch belief in South West Scotland" (PDF). Scottish Historical Review. 85 (1): 52–74. doi:10.3366/shr.2006.0015. ISSN 0036-9241. S2CID 159538376.
- Henderson, Lizanne (2016). Witchcraft and Folk Belief in the Age of Enlightenment Scotland, 1670–1740 (PDF). Basingstoke: Palgrave Macmillan. ISBN 978-1-349-59313-2.
- Historic Environment Scotland. "High Street, Tolbooth, Market Cross and Well (Category A Listed Building LB36542)".
- Hume, John R (2000). Dumfries and Galloway: An Illustrated Architectural Guide. Edinburgh: The Rutland Press. ISBN 1-873190-34-4.
- Jardine, Mark (2009). The United Societies: Militancy, Martyrdom and the Presbyterian Movement in Late-Restoration Scotland, I679 to I688 (PDF) (PhD). University of Edinburgh.
- "John Neilson of Corsock". Scottish Covenanter Memorials Association.
- "John Paul Jones Timeline". SeacoastNH.com.
- "Kirkcudbright Tolbooth". Scottish Covenanter Memorials Association.
- "Life of John Paul Jones". John Paul Jones Cottage Museum.
- Royal Commission on the Ancient and Historical Monuments of Scotland (1996). Tolbooths and Townhouses: Civic Architecture In Scotland To 1833. Edinburgh: H.M. Stationery Office. ISBN 9780114957995.
- Stell, Geoffrey (1996). Exploring Scotland's Heritage: Dumfries and Galloway (Second ed.). Edinburgh: The Stationery Office. ISBN 0-11-495294-9.
- "Tolbooth Art Centre, Kirkcudbright". DG Culture. Dumfries and Galloway Council.
- "William Hunter and Robert Smith's Gravestone". Scottish Covenanter Memorials Association.
