= William Hanna Clarke =

Scottish artist

William Hanna Clarke (1882– 1 May 1924) was a dentist, then an artist, from Glasgow, Scotland. Clarke lived, worked as an artist, died and is buried in Kirkcudbright, Scotland.

Clarke was a landscape and figure painter and many of his works featured Kirkcudbright. He is buried in the town's churchyard and his tombstone was carved by his friend, Glasgow sculptor Alexander Proudfoot.
