= George Henry Paulin =

Scottish sculptor (1888–1962)

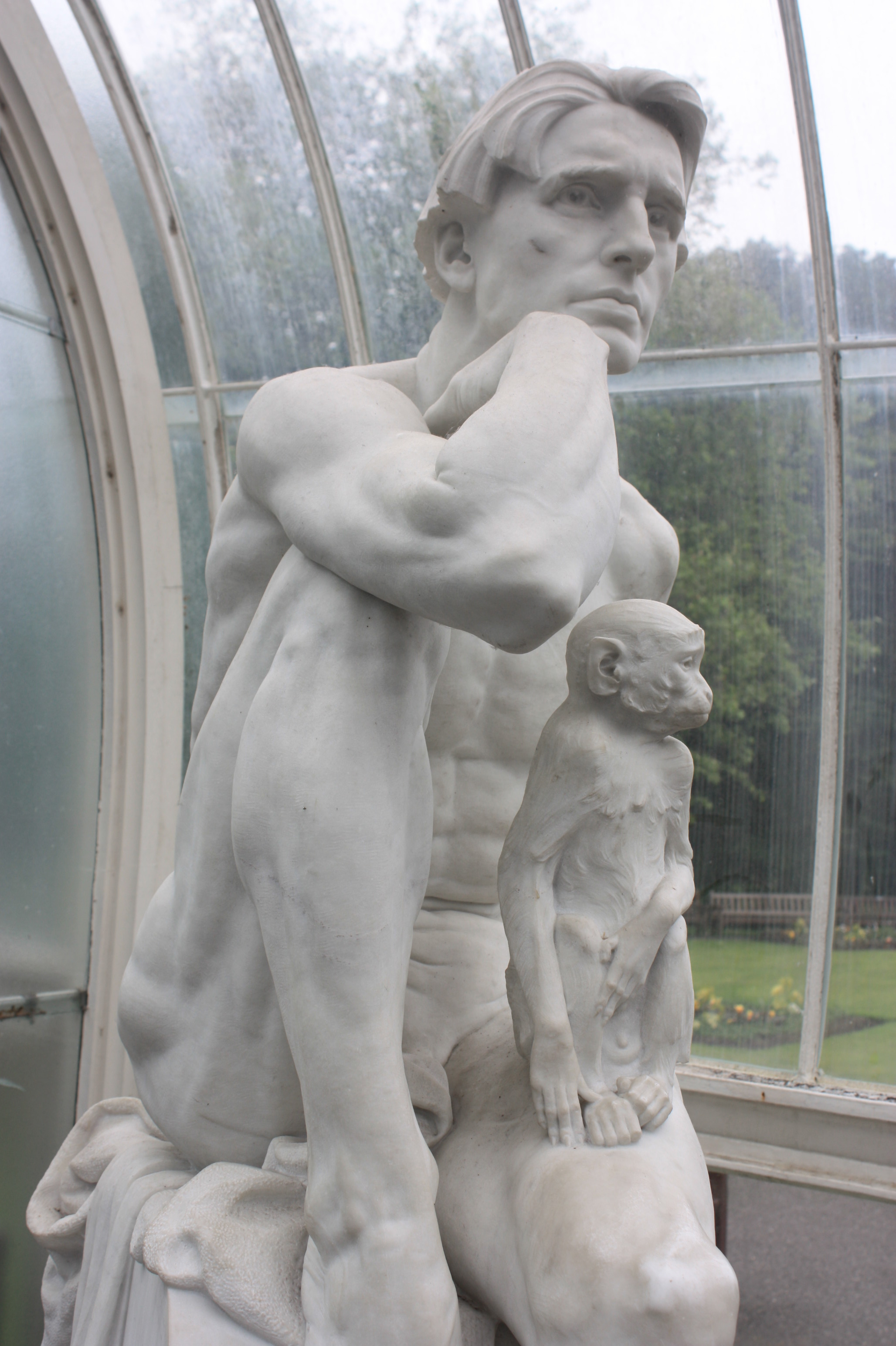
King Robert of Sicily by George Henry Paulin, Kibble Palace, Glasgow

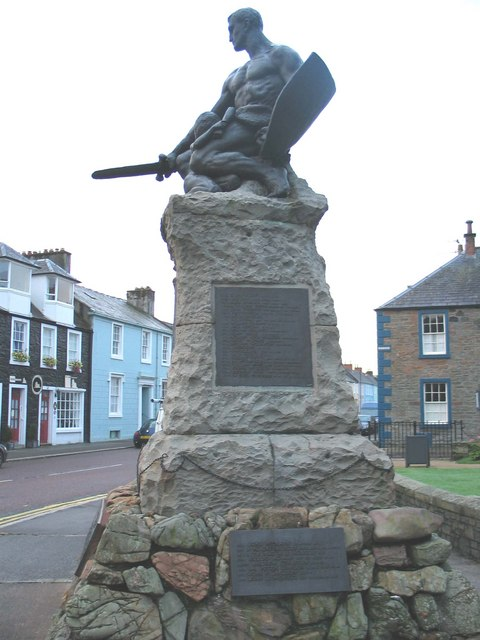
Kirkcudbright war memorial – by Paulin

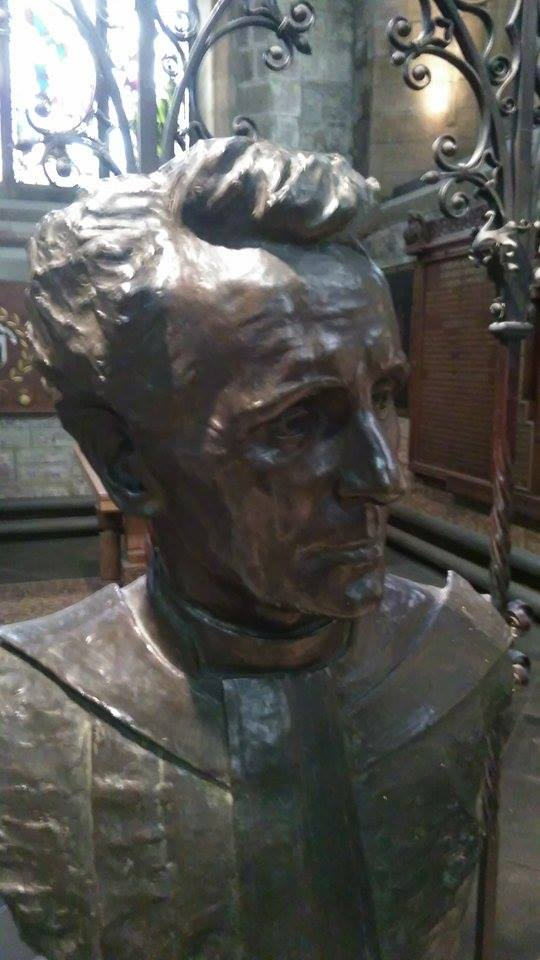
Rev James Black by Harry Paulin, St Giles Cathedral, Edinburgh

George Henry Paulin (14 August 1888 – 1962), often called Harry Paulin, or 'GHP' (his sculpting insignia) was a Scottish sculptor and artist of great note in the early 20th century.

== Life ==
Born in 1888 in the manse at Muckhart, Clackmannanshire, Scotland, the eldest son of the Reverend George Paulin (1839–1909) and Jane Craig Panton (1853–1923). His father was the local Church of Scotland minister. His paternal grandfather George Paulin was Rector of Irvine Academy and wrote poetry. His paternal uncle was Sir David Paulin.

He attended Dollar Academy from 1900 to 1905 where he displayed great artistic talent, primarily as a sculptor and carver. During his youth he attracted the interest of a neighbouring artist, Sholto Johnstone Douglas who lived at Birkhill, Muckhart, where the Paulin family moved following Rev. Paulin's death. He pressed the family into sending Harry to Edinburgh College of Art. As a result, Paulin was withdrawn from school a year early and dispatched to Edinburgh.

At the end of his college period (1912), he was awarded a Diploma in Sculpture and a travelling scholarship to Paris and Rome. He attended L'Ecole des Beaux Arts in Paris for 12 months, where he shared a flat with fellow artist James Gunn, later to become Sir James Gunn RA. Paulin then moved to Florence, setting up studio there for 4 years, during which time he frequently visited Rome.

== First World War ==
At the outbreak of war in September 1914, Paulin had no need to leave, as Italy was initially neutral in the conflict. However, he returned to Scotland and enlisted in the Lothians and Border Horse as a trooper.

At the end of November 1914, he was trampled by a frightened horse, and as a consequence, had a kidney removed in a field hospital. He was invalided out of the army in December 1914. However, after a period of convalescence he re-enlisted as an officer in the Royal Flying Corps. With his keen eye he trained as an observer and navigator. There is evidence that he served in Italy, and this is logical given his strong command of Italian, working at least some of the time for military intelligence in Brindisi.

In January 1918, he transferred to the Royal Naval Air Service as a lieutenant. This later evolved into the Royal Air Force and he served as a lieutenant, largely taking on the role of intelligence. He therefore served in army, navy and air force, a relatively rare distinction.

== Inter-war ==
In many ways, it may be said that the war launched Paulin's career in that it was in the field of war memorials which he gained most fame.

In 1919, he set up a studio in Buccleuch Street in Glasgow. He received many commissions for war memorials at this time, as may be expected of a competent sculptor of the human form. The first to bring him true "fame" was Kirkcudbright war memorial.

This work lead to his commission to create major monuments in Flanders itself, most notably that to the 51st (Highland) Division sited in the Newfoundland's Field of Remembrance at Beaumont-Hamel. Then followed a memorial to the 8th Battalion Argyll and Sutherland Highlanders on a different site near Beaumont-Hamel.

Perhaps his most noteworthy "international commission" at this time was the 1920 headstone on the grave of Andrew Carnegie in Sleepy Hollow Cemetery near New York City. This gives some indication of his international renown at the time.

In 1920, he was elected a member of the Royal Scottish Academy. In 1927, he was elected a Member of the Royal Society of British Sculptors. In 1927, he was also appointed official representative of the Royal Scottish Academy in London, a post retained until 1957.

In 1935, he was commissioned by the Royal Academy of Arts to create a series of 22 busts of eminent fellow artists. In the same year, he was elected Honorary Sculpture Member of the Royal Institution of Painters in Watercolours.

In 1938, he rose to the rank of Fellow in the Royal Society of British Sculptors.

Another major work of this period was a statue of "King Robert of Sicily" a fictional character created by Henry Wadsworth Longfellow which sits in Kibble Palace in Glasgow.

== Second World War ==
In the Second World War, Paulin was rejected for active service, and, somewhat surprisingly perhaps, chose to work in a munitions factory in Glasgow, helping with precision engineering needs.

Meanwhile, his London studio was destroyed in The Blitz.

Latterly in the war, he is believed to have worked in the camouflage section.

== Post war ==
In 1945, he received a commission from the United States Navy to create a monument to John Paul Jones the founder of the American Navy, in his home town of Kirkbean near Dumfries. This memorial forms a font in the church: one panel shows the USS Bonhomme Richard, John Paul Jones' flagship; one panel shows Jones himself; the third shows the seal of the United States Navy.

He was invited to compete for the Commando Memorial at Spean Bridge but was unsuccessful in this bid. A similar unchosen work (though winning the competition was a war memorial to the Australian Armed Forces to be erected on the Strand in London, adjacent to Australia House. Chosen but unexecuted (due to the death of the benefactor) was a statue of St George slaying the dragon originally destined for St. George's Chapel in Westminster Abbey. A successful and built commission of public note was the Royal Coat of Arms added as a ceiling boss to the same chapel. This sculpture was painted by contemporary artist Frank O. Salisbury RA.

In 1953, his career was further boosted by the coronation of Queen Elizabeth II. Three Royal Commissions were received this year by Paulin. Firstly, the first ever depiction of a monarch's head, for use as a hallmark; secondly, miniature busts of both the Queen and Prince Philip for which they sat personally; and thirdly a series of miniature statuettes of the couple for sale throughout the Commonwealth. It is noteworthy that the latter depiction of the Queen sold over 250,000 copies a remarkable number for any art work. Those of Prince Philip sold considerably less.

As a result of this publicity, he received another wave of private commissions. The most important of these (1954) was a memorial to the ballerina, Anna Pavlova. This was erected in her former home in Hampstead, London, then a hospital, now a school.

In 1956, he received another commission for a life-size bust of Queen Elizabeth II for display in the Royal Scottish Academy.

Paulin retired in 1957 and moved to Berkshire. He died from lung cancer in 1962, aged 74.

== Family ==
In October 1921 Paulin married Muriel Margaret Cairns (b. 1897) the daughter of Rev John Edgar Cairns, his father's successor as minister of Muckhart.

== Posthumous success ==
One scheme shelved, but ultimately now built, was a memorial to the Royal Tank Regiment. This macquette from the early 1950s was ultimately recreated full-size (2.75m high) by sculptor Vivien Mallock in June 2000. The central figure, originally modelled on Paulin's own son, is modelled on one of Paulin's grandsons, himself a recent veteran of the British Army. It was unveiled by Her Majesty Queen Elizabeth II on the 100th anniversary of the conceptual invention of the tank. The monument stands at the junction of Whitehall Place and Whitehall Court, in London.

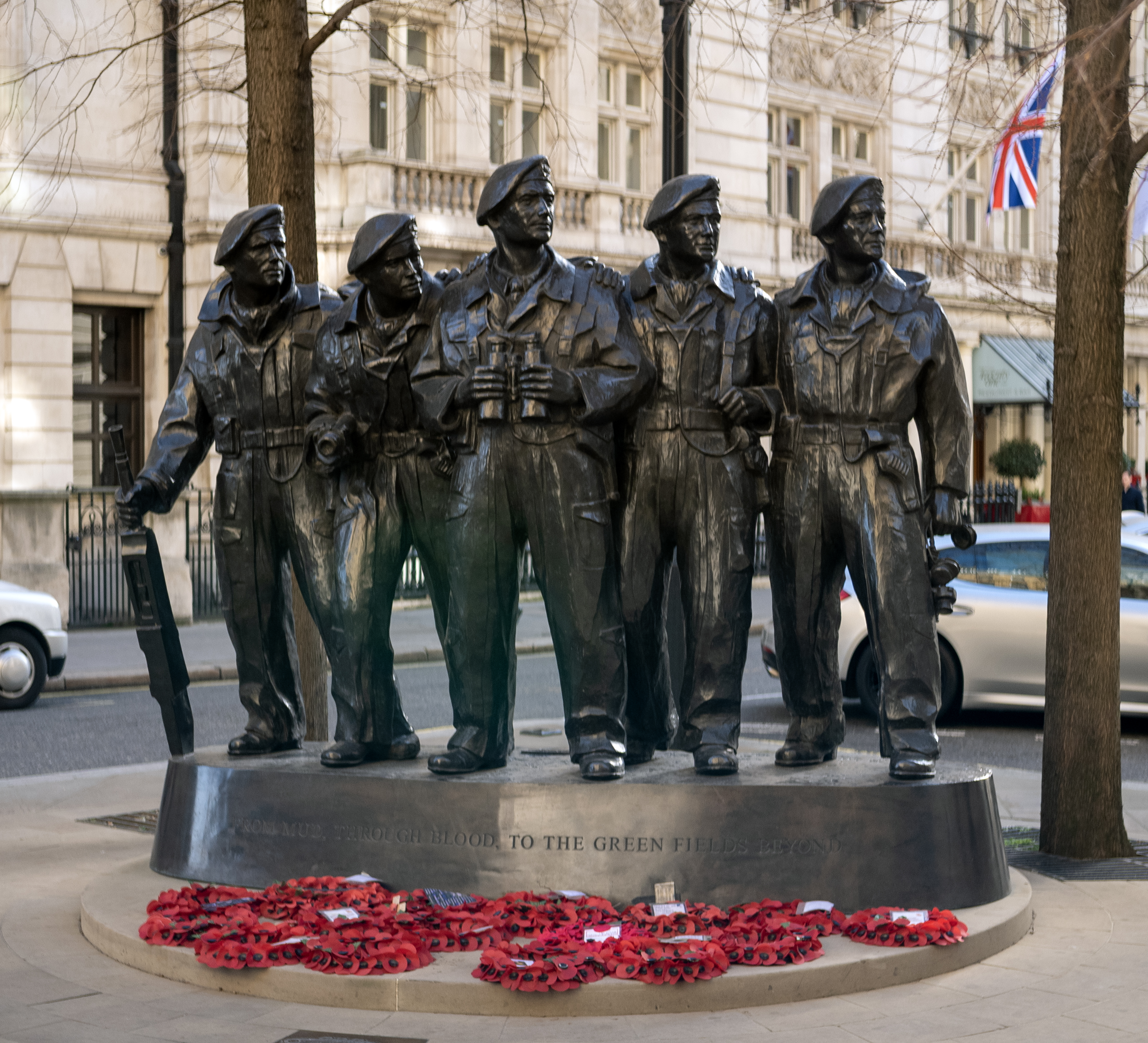

== Principal works ==
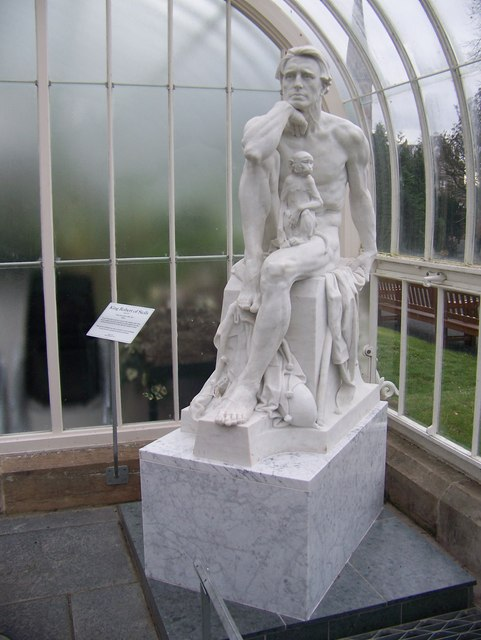
Paulin's "King of Sicily" in the Kibble Palace

- 51st (Highland) Division Memorial, part of the Beaumont-Hamel Newfoundland Memorial).
- Monument to the 8th Battalion Argyll and Sutherland Highlanders, Beaumont-Hamel.
- Kirkcudbright War Memorial
- Dollar War Memorial
- Muckhart War Memorial
- Denny War Memorial
- Milngavie War Memorial
- Rutherglen War Memorial
- Coalsnaughton War Memorial
- Kirkcaldy War Memorial
- Memorial to the Machine Gun Corps and Royal Tank Regiment, Whitehall, London
- Bust of Queen Elizabeth II, Royal Scottish Academy, Edinburgh.
- Gravestone to Andrew Carnegie, Sleepy Hollow Cemetery.
- Memorial font to John Paul Jones, Kirkbean Parish Church, in Kirkcudbrightshire.
- Memorial bust of Lord Lister
- Memorial bust of Sir William Ramsay
- Portrait bust of the Duchess of Atholl at Blair Atholl Castle.
- Portrait busts of all presidents of the Royal Academy.
- Statue of "King Robert of Sicily" in the Kibble Palace.
- Memorial to Anna Pavlova, Hampstead.
- Royal Coat of Arms, ceiling, St George's Chapel, Westminster Abbey.

== Sources ==
- Biography in London Atelier Of Representational Art
- Who Was Who; 1961–70
