= Kirkcudbright =

Town in Dumfries and Galloway, Scotland

Coordinates: 54.832°N 4.048°W

Kirkcudbright: Scottish Gaelic: Cille Chùithbeirt
- Town
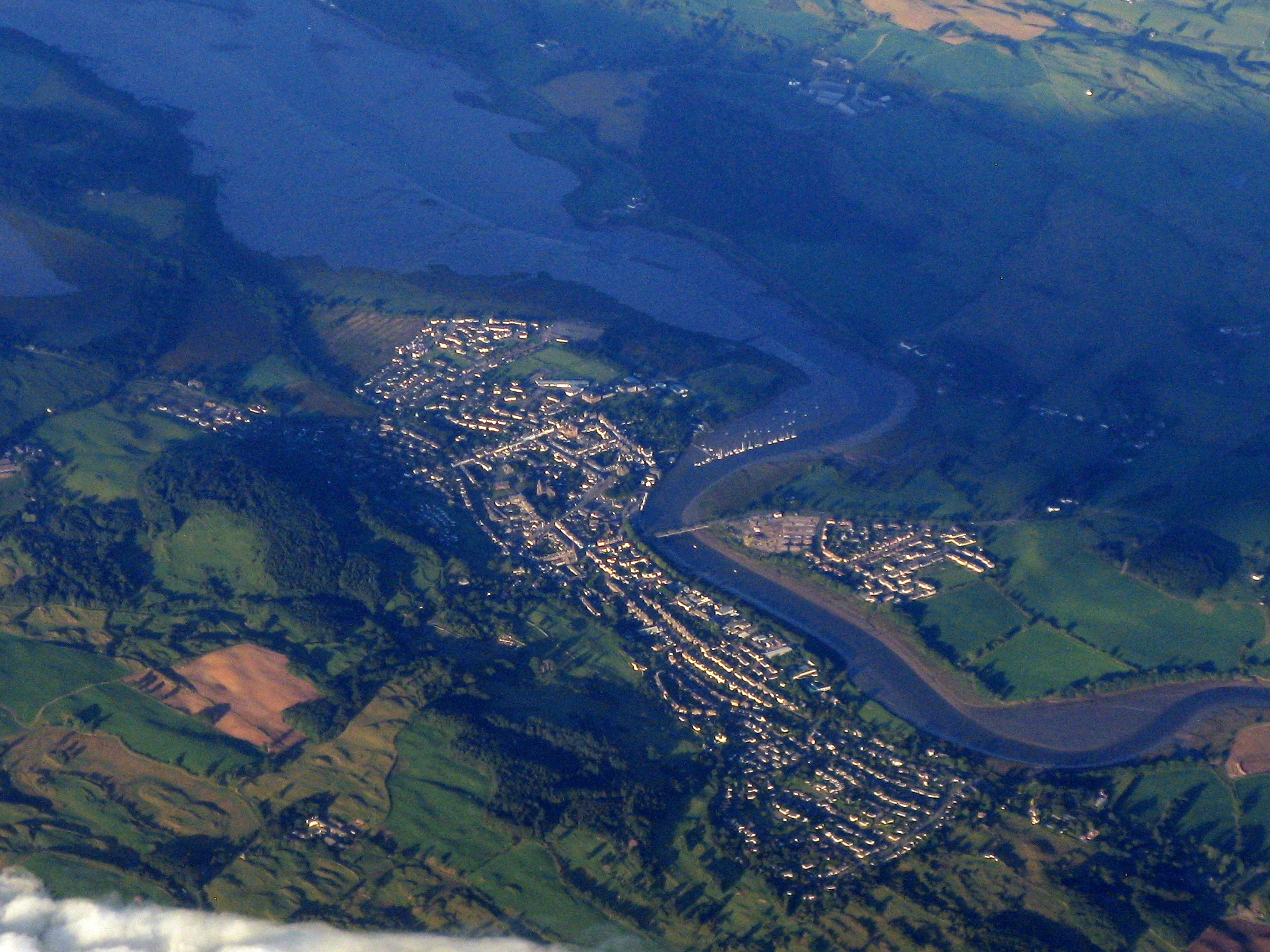
- Aerial view of Kirkcudbright and the River Dee

- Location within Dumfries and Galloway
- Population: 3,233 (2022)
- OS grid reference: NX685505
  - Edinburgh: 84 mi (135 km)
  - London: 282 mi (454 km)
- Council area: Dumfries and Galloway
- Lieutenancy area: Kirkcudbrightshire
- Country: Scotland
- Sovereign state: United Kingdom
- Post town: KIRKCUDBRIGHT
- Postcode district: DG6
- Dialling code: 01557
- Police: Scotland
- Fire: Scottish
- Ambulance: Scottish
- UK Parliament: Dumfries and Galloway
- Scottish Parliament: Galloway and West Dumfries

Kirkcudbright (/kərˈkuːbri/ kur-KOO-bree; Scottish Gaelic: Cille Chùithbeirt) is a harbour town and former royal burgh at the mouth of the River Dee in Dumfries and Galloway, Scotland, southwest of Castle Douglas and Dalbeattie. Traditionally the county town of Kirkcudbrightshire, it is 84 miles (135 km) southwest of Edinburgh, 71 miles (114 km) south-southwest of Glasgow, and 8 miles (14 km) northeast of Castle Douglas. It had a population of 3,233 in 2022.

== History ==
An early rendition of the name of the town was Kilcudbrit; this derives from the Gaelic Cille Chuithbeirt meaning "chapel of Cuthbert", the saint whose mortal remains were kept at the town between their exhumation at Lindisfarne and reinterment at Chester-le-Street.

John Spottiswoode, in his account of religious houses in Scotland, mentions that the Franciscans, or Grey Friars, had been established at Kirkcudbright from the 12th century.

John Balliol was in possession of the ancient castle at Castledykes in the late 13th century and Edward I of England is said to have stayed here in 1300 during his war against Scotland.

In 1455 Kirkcudbright became a royal burgh. About a century later, the magistrates of the town obtained permission from Queen Mary to use part of the convent and nunnery as a parish church. From around 1570, Sir Thomas MacLellan of Bombie, the chief magistrate, received a charter for the site, its grounds and gardens. MacLellan dismantled the church in order to obtain material for his new castle, a very fine house, which was built on the site.

After defeat at the Battle of Towton, Henry VI of England crossed the Solway Firth in August 1461 to land at Kirkcudbright before joining his wife Queen Margaret in exile at Linlithgow. The town for some time withstood a siege in 1547 from the English commander Sir Thomas Carleton during the Eight Years' War but, after the surrounding countryside had been overrun, was compelled to surrender.

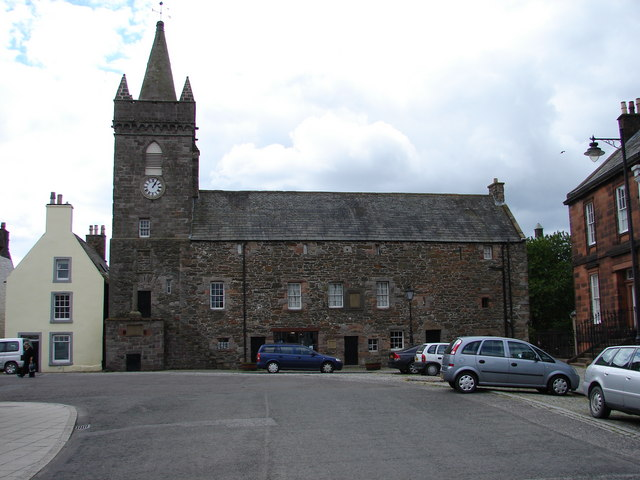
Kirkcudbright Tolbooth

Kirkcudbright Tolbooth was built between 1625 and 1629 and served not only as the tolbooth, but also the council offices, the burgh and sheriff courts, the criminal prison and the debtors' prison. One of the most famous prisoners was John Paul Jones, founder of the United States Navy, who was born in Kirkbean. The Tolbooth was superseded as the county's main administrative building by a new courthouse at 85 High Street, built in 1788 and rebuilt in 1868, which then served as the meeting place of Kirkcudbrightshire County Council from its creation in 1890 until 1952 when the council moved its meeting place to County Buildings.

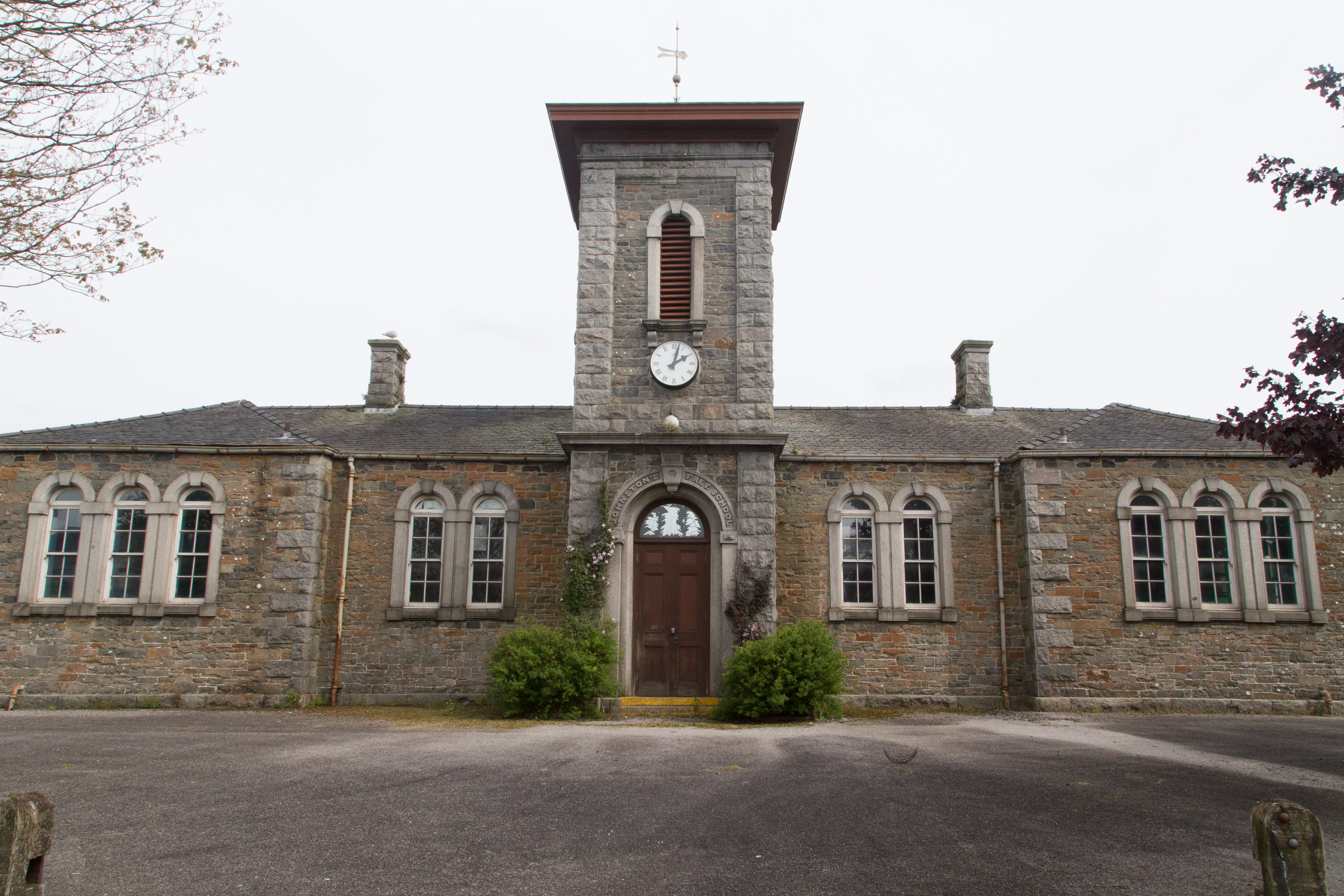
The Johnston School, Kirkcudbright

The Johnston School was one of the town's two primary schools, until it was merged with Castledykes Primary School in 2009, the new School called Kirkcudbright Primary School being housed in a new building. The school was endowed with a bequest by Kirkcudbright merchant and shipowner William Johnston (1769–1845) and opened in 1847 as Johnston's Free School. The building was designed by Edinburgh architect James Newlands (1813–1871) who later went on to be the first Borough Engineer for Liverpool where he designed and built the first integrated sewerage system in the world in 1848. The school building was rebuilt, retaining the Italianate tower and façade in 1933 by William A MacKinnell, (1871–1940). He was the County Architect for Kirkcudbrightshire and built many schools in the Stewartry. In 2020 the building was refurbished as a Community Activity and Resource Centre. The building is Listed Category B.

St Andrew's and St Cuthbert's Church was designed in 1886 by London architect A. E. Purdie (1843–1920), in the Gothic style. It was built on the site of the medieval St Andrew's Church. In 1971 the interior was re-ordered and stripped of its Victorian fixtures and fittings and now features an abstract concrete and iron cross by the Liverpool sculptor Sean Rice (1931–1997), modern stained glass by the Polish artist Jerzy Faczynski (1917–1994) and a set of four paintings by Vivien K. Chapman depicting The Passion of Christ.

The Kirkcudbright Railway opened in 1864 but the railway line and station closed in 1965.

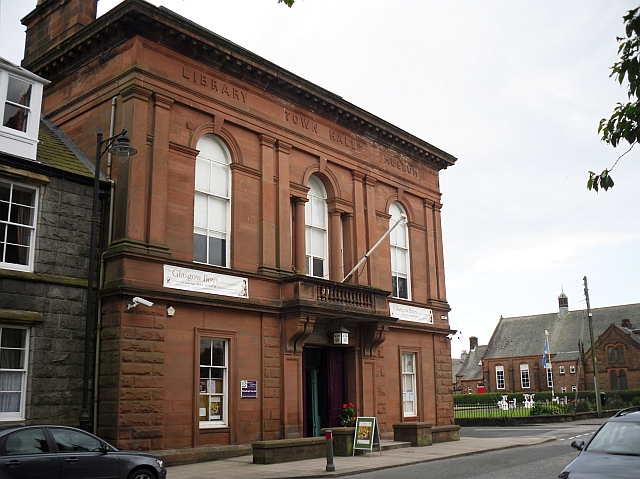
Kirkcudbright Galleries

Kirkcudbright Town Hall was designed by architects Peddie and Kinnear. It was completed in 1879 and is a Category B listed building. It has since been converted into the Kirkcudbright Galleries, a new facility which was opened by the Princess Royal on 12 July 2018.

The war memorial dates from 1921 and was created by the sculptor George Henry Paulin.

=== Training area ===
Like many other remote areas during the Second World War, a 4,700-acre (19 km^{2}) area to the southeast of the town and extending to the coast of the Solway Firth, was acquired by the Army in 1942, as a training area for the D-Day invasion. The area remains in active use for live-firing exercises. Part of the training area is the Dundrennan Range, a weapons development and testing range. The use of this range for the testing of depleted uranium shells has been controversial. The range also contains a surviving A39 Tortoise heavy assault tank.

=== Museums ===
Broughton House is an 18th-century town house standing on the High Street. It was the home of Scots impressionist artist Edward Atkinson Hornel between 1901 and his death in 1933. The National Trust for Scotland maintain the house and its contents as a museum of Hornel's life and work.

The Stewartry Museum was founded in 1879 and was at first based in the Town Hall until it became too small to house the collections. The collection moved to a purpose-built site. It contains the local and natural history of the Stewartry of Kirkcudbright. Britain's earliest surviving sporting trophy, the Siller Gun, is part of the collection.

The Tolbooth building is now used as an arts centre.

== Art ==
Kirkcudbright has for long been a centre for visual artists and is now known as "the Artists' Town". The main routes into the town include brown tourist signs saying "Artists' Town".

Kirkcudbright is home to an artists' collective which has a shop in the town centre, The PA, Professional Artists Collective. Wasps Studios (Workshop & Artists Studio Provision Scotland) occupy two linked townhouses, Canonwalls and Claverhouse, in the High Street. It is also a centre in which many artists open their studios during Spring Fling Open Studios.

The Kirkcudbright Arts & Crafts Trail takes place every summer. This four-day event, finishing on the first Monday in August, allows visitors to see artists' studios and visit places that are normally off-limits to visitors.

=== Galleries ===
Galleries in Kirkcudbright include Kirkcudbright Galleries, in the former Town Hall on St Mary Street, and the Harbour Cottage Gallery.

=== Cinema and literature ===
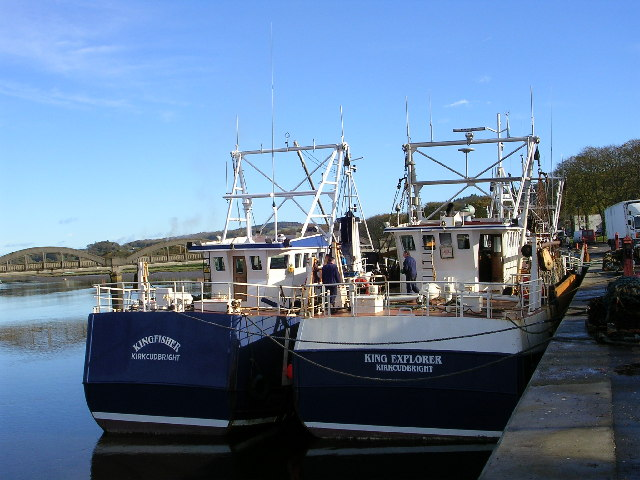
Kirkcudbright Harbour

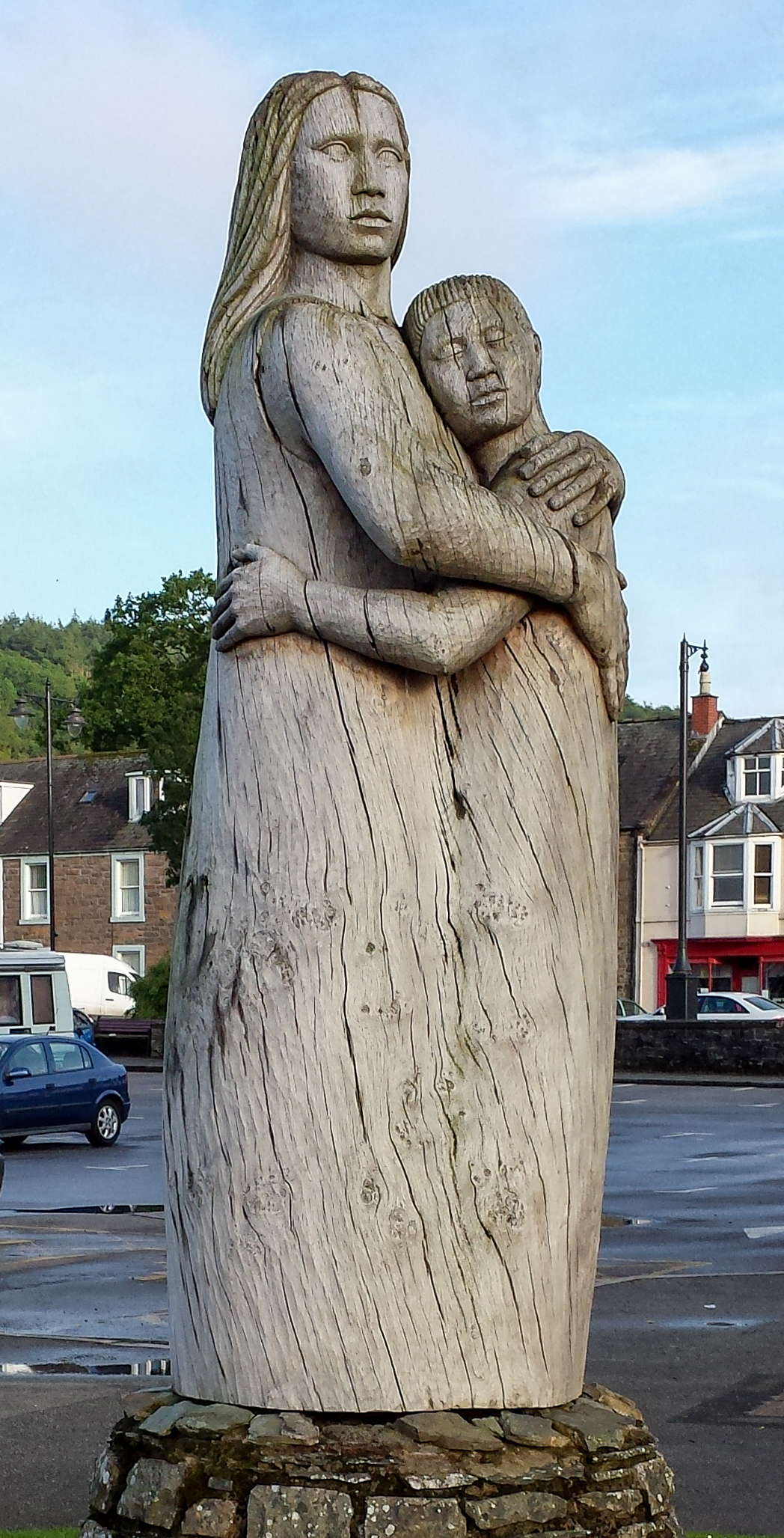
1994 wooden sculpture In Memory of Loved Ones Lost at Sea by Charlie Easterfield in Kirkcudbright harbour

The 1907 novel Little Esson by S. R. Crockett is a romantic mystery involving the artistic community of Kirkcudbright. The title character Archibald Esson is a fictionalised version of William Stewart MacGeorge, Crockett's boyhood friend. The later whodunit Five Red Herrings by Dorothy L. Sayers also involves the artistic community of Kirkcudbright. In 1975, the book was made into a BBC TV drama series shot in the town, with Ian Carmichael playing the lead role of Lord Peter Wimsey.

The town also provided locations for the cult 1973 horror film The Wicker Man.

Robert Urquhart starred in a 1980 BBC adaptation of Ibsen's An Enemy of the People, shot on location in Kirkcudbright.

=== Music ===
Matt McGinn wrote and recorded "The Wee Kirkcudbright Centipede" which has also been covered by other singers including Alistair McDonald on disc and on his BBC Scotland show Songs of Scotland, which included a segment filmed on location at the town's Johnston Primary School where McDonald led the children in a dance sequence.

== Notable people ==
=== Artists ===
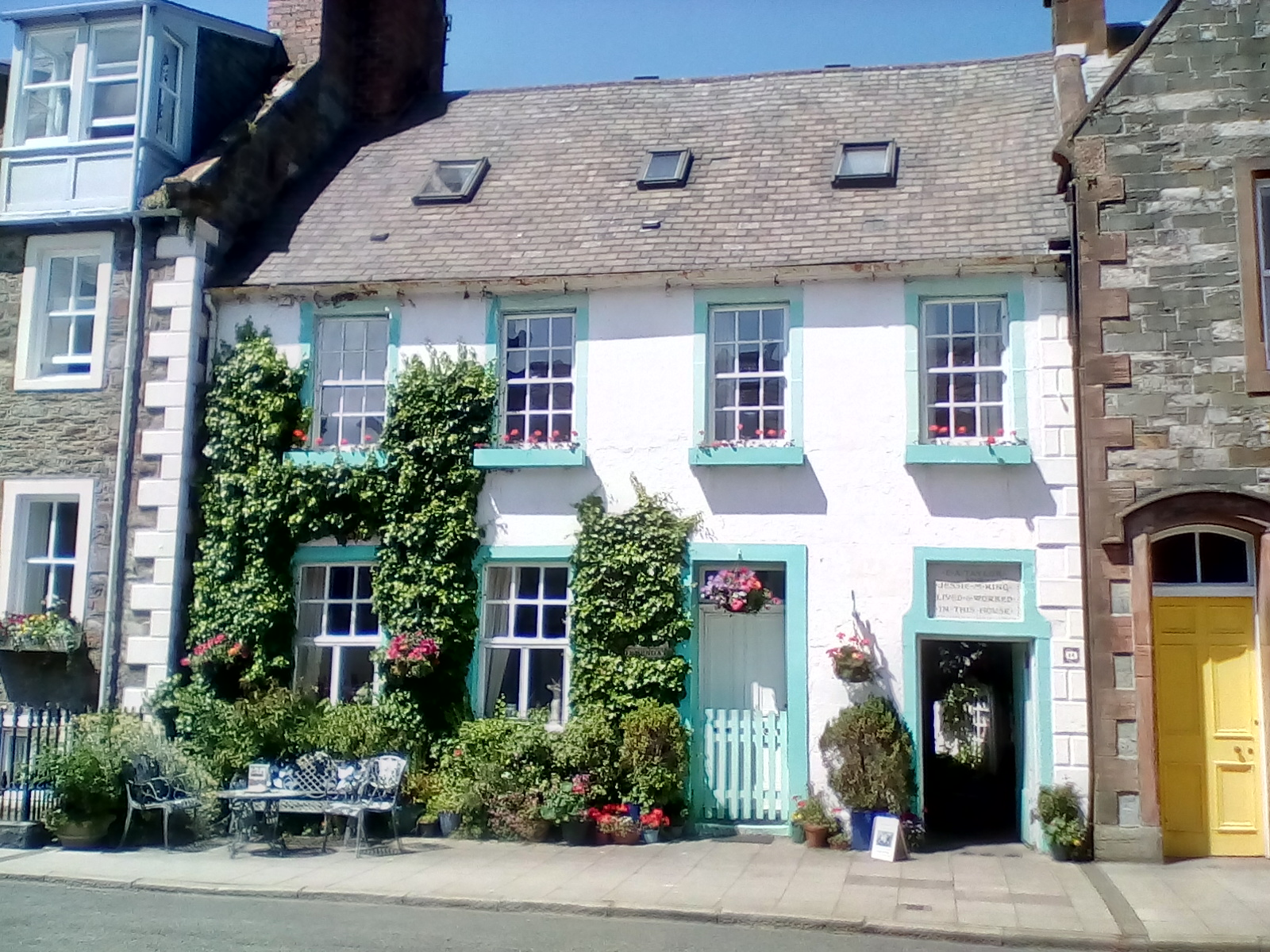
Jessie M. King's house, Greengate

Kirkcudbright has had a long association with the Glasgow art movement. Several artists, including the Glasgow Boys and the famed Scottish Colourists, such as Samuel Peploe and Francis Cadell, based themselves in the area over a 30-year period from 1880 to 1910, establishing the Kirkcudbright Artists' Colony. Also among those who moved here from Glasgow were Edward Hornel, George Henry and Jessie M. King. Later another small group of Glasgow-trained artists built their studios across the river at The Stell, including John Charles Lamont and Robert Sivell. Landscape painter Charles Oppenheimer moved to Kirkcudbright in 1908. He is given credit along with artist Dorothy Nesbitt for protecting the Harbour Cottage (art) Gallery from demolition in 1956. Kirkcudbright became known as "the artists' town". Other artists include:

- Joseph Simpson (1879–1939), British painter and etcher of portraits and sporting subjects.
- Phyllis Bone (1894–1972), Scottish sculptor who moved to Galloway and lived in later life in Kirkcudbright.
- William Hanna Clarke (1882–1924), landscape and figure painter who lived in Kirkcudbright, and many of his works featured the town. He is buried in the town's churchyard and his tombstone was carved by his friend Alexander Proudfoot, a Glasgow sculptor.

=== Sportspeople ===
- Bob McDougall (1894–1936), George Cloy and David Mathieson (born 1978), professional footballers who lived in the town.
- David MacMyn (1903–1978), Scottish rugby international, was from Kirkcudbright.

=== Others ===
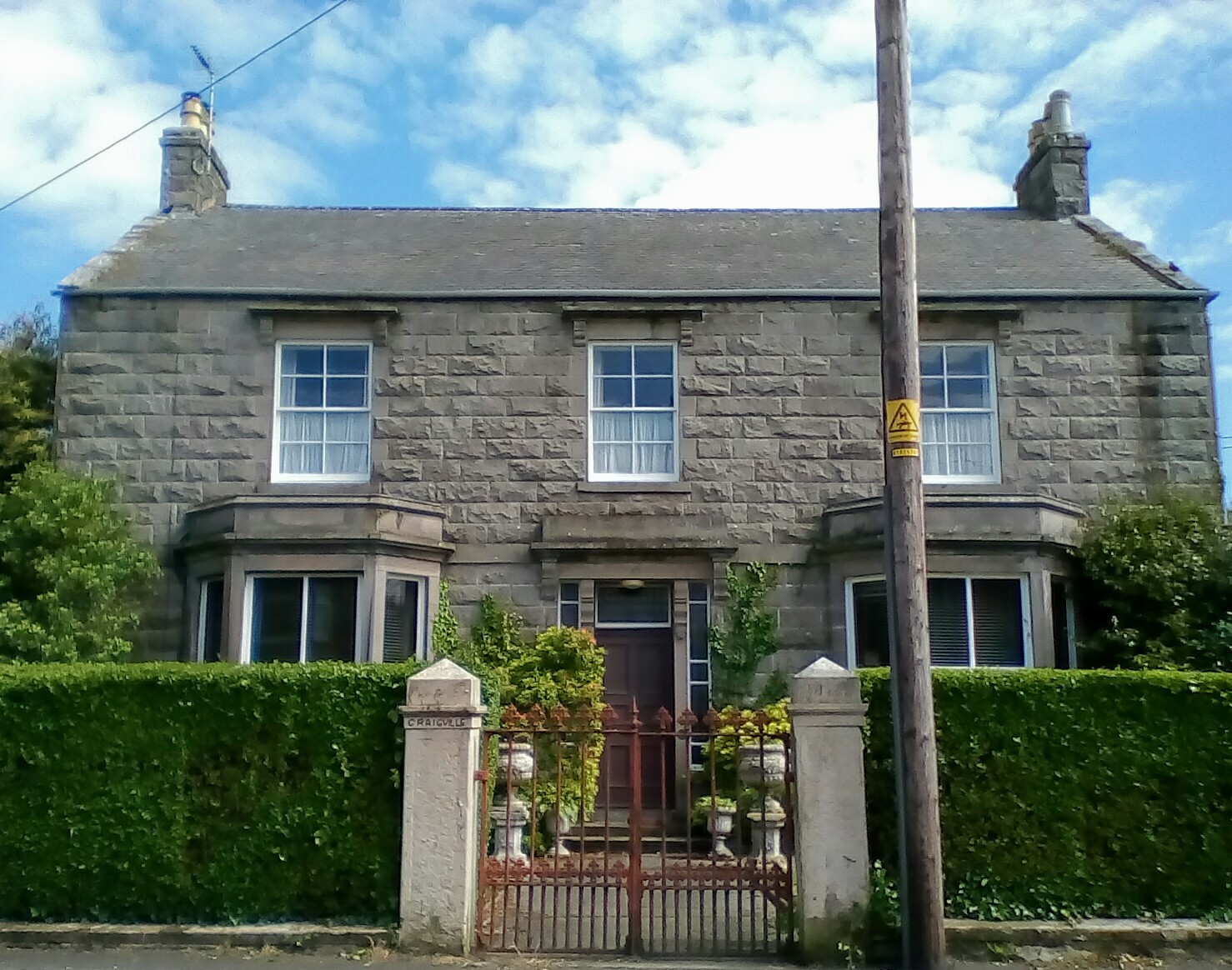
Lawrence of Arabia's family lived at Craigville, St Mary's Street, Kirkcudbright between 1889 and 1891

- Nigel Biggar (born 1955), in 2025 became "Baron Biggar" of Castle Douglas in the Stewartry of Kirkcudbright.
- Malcolm Caldwell, born James Alexander Malcolm Caldwell (1931–1978), British academic and a prolific Marxist writer. Caldwell was murdered, under mysterious circumstances, a few hours after meeting Pol Pot in Cambodia. His father, Archibald Thomson Caldwell was County Architect for Kirkcudbrightshire from 1950 until his death in 1957. Caldwell was Dux of Kirkcudbright Academy in 1949.
- Cecil Coles (1888–1918), a composer who was born in Kirkcudbright and killed on active service in the First World War.
- John Duncan (1805–1849), a Scottish explorer in Africa. Born at Culdoach, the family farm.
- Marriott Edgar (1880–1951), lyricist and poet who wrote, amongst other things, Albert and the Lion for Stanley Holloway, was born in Kirkcudbright.
- John Erskine, 1st Baron Erskine of Rerrick (1893–1980), banker and Governor of Northern Ireland.
- T. E. Lawrence (Lawrence of Arabia) (1888–1935), lived in infancy with his family between 1889 and 1891 in Craigville, St Mary's Street. His brother William George was born here in 1889.
- Gary Lewis (born 1957), actor in Gangs of New York, Billy Elliot, etc. lives in Kirkcudbright.
- Sara Maitland (born 1950), daughter of Adam Maitland of Cumstoun House (a descendant of Judge Thomas Maitland, Lord Dundrennan). She is a British writer of religious fantasy. A novelist, she is also known for her short stories.

== Media ==
Local TV coverage is provided by BBC Reporting Scotland on BBC One & ITV News Lookaround on ITV1. Radio stations that broadcast the town are BBC Radio Scotland on 93.1 FM and Greatest Hits Radio Dumfries & Galloway on 103.0 FM. The town is served by the local newspapers, Dumfries & Galloway Standard and the Dumfries Courier which publishes on Fridays. T

== Sport ==
Kirkcudbright is represented in the South of Scotland Football League by St Cuthbert Wanderers FC. It was founded by parishioners of St Cuthbert Catholic Church. The club's best-known former players are Bob McDougall, Billy Halliday and David Mathieson.

=== 2019 Tour of Britain ===
The first stage from Glasgow of the Tour of Britain 2019 ended in Kirkcudbright on 7 September. The winner was Dutchman Dylan Groenewegen.
