= Ann Dallas =

British artist (1908–1996)

- Born: Wylliann Weatherall; 1908; Blyth, Northumberland
- Died: October 1996; Dumfries and Galloway
- Education: King Edward VII School of Art at Armstrong College
- Movement: Kirkcudbright Artists' Colony
- Spouse: Alastair Dallas

Ann Dallas (born Wylliann Weatherall, 10 January 1908 – 2 October 1996) was a British artist. She was a member of the Kirkcudbright Artists' Colony in Kirkcudbright, Scotland, where she moved in 1958. Her works, like those of her husband Alastair Dallas, focused on paintings in watercolour and oil of local views such as the harbour, and local people. Ann also painted pictures of the north of Scotland, where she was taken by her son, also Alastair during his summer holidays.

Weatherall was born in Newbiggin, Northumberland. The daughter of a colliery engineman, who became PC200, to retire a police inspector. Ann attended the King Edward VII School of Art at Armstrong College (then part of Durham University), where she studied under instructors such as Herbert Maryon. After graduating around 1929, she spent more than a decade teaching art at Gosforth Secondary School, while also regularly exhibiting sculptures, watercolours, and oil paintings at the Laing Art Gallery. She took her husband's surname after her 1945 marriage, and at some point adopted Ann as her professional given name—perhaps due in part to the similarity between Wylliann and William. The two moved to Scotland after their marriage, and settled first in Glenhead a farm cottage not far from Auchincairn, a village 10 miles from Kirkcudbright where they moved with their son in 1958.

Dallas exhibited frequently while in Kirkcudbright, particularly at the Harbour Cottage Gallery and Gracefield Arts Centre in Dumfries, as well as in Glasgow and Edinburgh. She was recognised as being among the last of the members of the Kirkcudbright Artists' Colony, which flourished from around 1880 to 1980.

== Early life and education ==
Wylliann Weatherall was born in 1908 in Blyth, Northumberland. Her father was a colliery engineman. She had a brother, Albert. and a sister Elenor (Ellie). She was educated at Blyth Secondary School for Girls, Rutherford College of Technology, and the King Edward VII School of Art at Armstrong College, then part of the University of Durham. Her instructors included Herbert Maryon, who taught sculpture, and she graduated around 1929.

It was said about the sisters, who're inclined to attend political meetings, Wylliann draws you, while Ellie writes down everything you say.

== Career ==
=== Early career ===
Weatherall's 1937 oil painting of her former teacher Herbert Maryon

After graduating from Armstrong, Weatherall began teaching art at Gosforth Secondary School. She was still teaching there in 1941. During this period, Weatherall also exhibited regularly at the Annual Exhibition of Works by Artists of the Northern Counties, held at the Laing Art Gallery. In most years from around 1929 to 1941, she exhibited works including sculptures, busts, watercolours, and oil paintings. Several of the portraits included busts of William Straker (general secretary of the Northumberland Miners' Association), one of which was placed in Burt Hall, a sculpture of E. M. O'R. Dickey, and an oil portrait of her former teacher Maryon.

=== Kirkcudbright ===
Following her 1945 marriage to Alastair Dallas, Weatherall took her husband's surname. Perhaps around this time, she also began going professionally by the given name Ann—possibly to avoid confusion caused by the similarity between "Wylliann" and "William". (Note: Her first name has also been misspelled as "Wyllian", "Wyllianor", and "Williann".) Dallas and her husband lived first in a rented house in Kippford; soon thereafter, they moved to Glenhead in Auchencairn, where they remained for a decade. Around 1958 they moved to Kirkcudbright, where they set up a studio next to Kirkcudbright Tolbooth. (Note: Sources differ on the timing of the move to Kirkcudbright. The 2006 book Tales of the Kirkcudbright Artists says that "Possibly through a friend, they began their married life in a rented house at Kippford. Soon afterwards they moved to Auchencairn, remaining there for a decade before finally settling in Kirkcudbright in 1958." Ann Dallas's obituaries, by contrast, state that "The couple set up their studio in High Street in the late 1940s having previously lived for a few years at Glenhead, Auchencairn", and that Dallas "came to live in Kirkcudbright over 58 years ago, when the couple set up their studio next to" the Tolbooth.) The town was home to the Kirkcudbright Artists' Colony, having lured artists with its charm, seaside location, natural light, and cheap property. This distinction, with Kirkcudbright referred to as "The Artists' Town", or "the St Ives of Scotland" lasted for a century, from around 1880 to 1980.

In Kirkcudbright, both Dallas and her husband focused on paintings of local views and local people in oil and watercolour; a frequent subject for Ann Dallas was the harbour, and she liked to try painting roses once per year. She often exhibited at the Harbour Cottage Gallery in Kirkcudbright. She also showed works at the Gracefield Arts Centre in Dumfries, as well as in Glasgow and Edinburgh. In the early 1980s, Harbour Cottage Gallery put on a joint exhibition of the works of her and her husband; though they were both still alive, it was termed a "memorial" exhibition.

In 1993, Dallas met Queen Elizabeth II during dedication ceremonies at the Tolbooth, which was being reopened as an art centre following renovations. At the time, The Galloway News described Dallas as "the last surviving member of the old school of painters in Kirkcudbright". (Note: Writing the following year, the paper described her and Tom Lochhead as "perhaps [the] only two" still living.) Around 1994, she also met Charles III (then Prince of Wales) during his own visit to Kirkcudbright. She continued painting, particularly in watercolours, until near the end of her life.

== Legacy ==
From September to October 1998, two years after Dallas died, the Harbour Cottage Gallery staged a memorial exhibition of her work. The exhibition included works from friends and family dating from the mid-1920s until the 1990s. Writing in The Galloway News, a reviewer wrote that "This exhibition reveals a prodigious wealth of talent—an artist equally conversant with techniques in oil, pencil, watercolour and sculpture." Another reviewer for the paper called it "a sad reminder of the passing of time but a fitting tribute". (Note: Another reason for the sadness, the reviewer stated, was that "Kirkcudbright is an 'art town' because of the quality of its past—a past which is largely invisible today because there is no gallery to house the large quantity of work that was painted here. If such pretensions are justified the town needs to be able to prove its case in the public eye, and only by addressing its past can the town move forward and attract art of similar quality today.")

Several works by Dallas are held in public institutions. These include a 1933 bust of Straker (Woodhorn Museum), her oil portrait of Provost Brown (Stewartry Museum), the oil painting Jug of Roses (Kirkcudbright Hospital), (Note: In May 1992, Dallas took out a newspaper ad thanking "Doctors and staff of Dumfries Infirmary and Kirkcudbright Cottage Hospital for the good care and attention, also to friends for good wishes, cards and flowers".) and the oil painting The 'Mary Pullman' (Stewartry Museum). Additional works are displayed online.

== Personal life ==
Weatherall enjoyed staying in youth hostels, and in 1938 met Alexander (Alastair) Arthur KennedyDallas, also an artist, while staying in one in Glen Nevis. They married in 1945 and had a son, also named Alastair. The elder Alastair died on 26 December 1983.

Dallas died in October 1996 at Dumfries and Galloway Royal Infirmary, aged 88. A service was held at Greyfriars Church in Kirkcudbright, followed by a funeral in St Cuthbert's churchyard. Both were conducted by the Reverend Arnold Simister, a family friend.

== Selected exhibitions ==
Laing Art Gallery: Annual Exhibition of Works by Artists of the Northern Counties

- 1929: Included Bather (sculpture), priced at £15.
- 1931: Included The Water Girl (sculpture).
- 1932: Included bust of William Straker, along with Miss Joan Howson (sculpture), Fantasy (sculpture), and a crucifix.
- 1933: Included April (sculpture), and a sculpture of E. M. O'R. Dickey.
- 1934: Included another sculpture of Straker, (Note: The Woodhorn Museum holds a bust of Straker by Weatherall, dated 1933, which may be this work.) and one of R. F. S. Morrison, the headmaster of Gosforth.
- 1935: Included Dancer (sculpture).
- 1937: Included an oil portrait of Herbert Maryon, Indian Scout (sculpture), and Sunbeam II (screen).
- 1940: Included two watercolours.
- 1941: Included watercolours and a sculpture.

Harbour Cottage Gallery

- Easter 1986: Included Loch Stroan, a watercolour reviewed as displaying Dallas's "sensitive approach to nature characterising even the smallest moorhen on the surface of the limpid water, while retaining her distinctive freshness of vision".
- Summer 1986: Included The Flowing Tide, a watercolour reviewed as displaying "great delicacy", and the oil The Venetian Glass Duck, reviewed as "masterly".
- Summer 1986 "Festival Exhibition": the only living artist represented, Dallas exhibited a portrait of a Provost John Brown, now held by the Stewartry Museum.
- Fall 1986: Included one work by Dallas, Dobbin, reviewed as "a work which would be hard to better. The subject is a black-smith's forge with one horse being shod while another waits patiently by. In style it looks back to the great period of Scottish art in the late nineteenth century, with its creamy tones and strong, unifying light catching the faces of the men and the round, chestnut body of the horse."
- Easter 1987: Included Ross Island, reviewed as "a large and dramatic landscape" that "depicts the sea on a stormy day, painted in oils with the power which typifies her work, almost carving out the foreground waves crashing against the rocks".
- Summer 1987: Included The Minnoch Gorge, reviewed as having "movement and vitality" with "paint which has a language and spirit of its own".
- Christmas 1987: Included hand-coloured Christmas cards and calendars.
- Easter 1988: Included Peace Roses, a still life in oils, which was reviewed as "a superb study which captures the fragility, almost the scent of the flowers in full bloom with powerful and sensuous handling", as well as The Venetian Glass Duck.
- Summer 1988
- Christmas 1990: Included prints on cards and calendars, reviewed as "suitably Christmassy", and the watercolour Loch Trool, deemed "a classic—and not for sale!"
- Easter 1992: Dallas reviewed as "less prolific now", but with "works which typify [her] style and skill".
- Summer 1992: Included a flower study, reviewed as "very fine".
- Christmas 1992: Included Christmas cards featuring local scenes.
- Easter 1993: Included Kirkcudbright from Silvercraigs Park, reviewed as "One of the highlights of the Kirkcudbright exhibition", and "a large and faultless pen and ink drawing of the rooftops of the town".
- Summer 1993
- Christmas 1993: Included cards, calendars, and framed prints.
- Easter 1994: Included The Mona — Kirkcudbright Harbour, reviewed as "painted using a very pure watercolour technique and achieving a real translucency with the medium".
- March 1995: Works from the Harbour Cottage Trust Collection, including Dallas's portrait of artist Vera Alabaster.
- Christmas 1995
- Fall 1998: Memorial exhibition spanning works from 1920s to 1990s.

Gracefield Arts Centre

- Summer 1986: 59th annual exhibition of the Dumfries and Galloway Fine Arts Society, including Castle Tioram, a watercolour reviewed as displaying "the distinctive translucency which marks her art", and Ardnamurchan Point, reviewed as "one of her all too rare seascapes in oil".
- Summer 1990: 63rd annual exhibition of the Dumfries and Galloway Fine Arts Society, including The Cree Estuary, a watercolour reviewed as "a summery scene which will not lack for admirers", along with The Ebbing Tide and the Dee Estuary, reviewed as displaying "how well she handles oils". Dallas termed "a very competent artist who uses her colours imaginatively and without undue exaggeration".
- Summer 1994: 67th annual exhibition of the Dumfries and Galloway Fine Arts Society.

== Bibliography ==
- Catalogue of the Annual Exhibition of Works of Artists of the Northern Counties. Newcastle upon Tyne: Laing Art Gallery and Museum. 1929. OCLC 173997307.
- Catalogue of the 30th Annual Exhibition of Works of Artists of the Northern Counties. Newcastle upon Tyne: Laing Art Gallery and Museum. 1937. OCLC 173997307.
- Gordon, Haig (2006). Tales of the Kirkcudbright Artists. Kirkcudbright: Galloway Publishing. ISBN 0-9553183-0-0.
