= Robson's Extreme Fishing Challenge =

Factual entertainment show about fishing

Robson's Extreme Fishing Challenge is a British factual entertainment show broadcast on Channel 5 and a spin-off series to Extreme Fishing with Robson Green. The show sees actor and fishing enthusiast Robson Green travel around the world to some of the greatest fishing destinations, where he challenges local masters of their craft over five rounds of competitive fishing.

== Episodes ==
=== Series 1 ===
Episode	Location	Broadcast date	Featured fish
1	Brazil	9 April 2012	Bluefish, flathead mullet, gilded catfish, electric eel, payara, Cilus gilberti
2	US, Great Lakes	16 April 2012	Muskellunge, rock bass, perch, goby, largemouth bass, freshwater drum, common carp, lake sturgeon, smallmouth bass
3	Mexico	23 April 2012	Striped marlin, pufferfish, red snapper, sandperch, great northern tilefish, triggerfish, Mexican hogfish, threadfin bass, french grunt, parrotfish, black jack, bonefish, permit, bonito, sailfish
4	Canada	30 April 2012	White sturgeon, northern pike, Arctic grayling, lake trout
5	US, Texas	7 May 2012	Alligator gar, largemouth bass, shrimp, Archosargus probatocephalus, crab, black-headed gull, black drum, gafftopsail catfish, red drum, Atlantic sharpnose shark, bull shark
6	US, East Coast	14 May 2012	Bluefin tuna, humpback whale, bluefish, blue shark, lobster, spiny dogfish, cod, haddock
7	Peru	21 May 2012	Rainbow trout, red bellied piranha, pacu, sardine, catfish, piraiba, Cheilodactylidae, moray eel
8	US, Alaska	28 May 2012	Coho salmon, chum salmon, pink salmon, cutthroat trout, lingcod, Atlantic halibut, kelp greenling

=== Series 2 ===
Episode	Location	Broadcast date	Featured fish
1	Tasmania	25 February 2013	Mako shark, elephant fish, gummy shark, southern black bream, brown trout, wrasse, morwong, butterfly perch, gurnard, rosy wrasse, Tasmanian red cod
2	Mozambique	4 March 2013	Yellowfin tuna, mahi-mahi, blacktip trevally, king mackerel, yellowspotted trevally, flamingo, ghost crab, vundu, electric catfish, tigerfish
3	Iceland	11 March 2013	Dab, Atlantic cod, Arctic char, wolf fish, brown trout
4	Hawaii	18 March 2013	Skipjack tuna, amberjack, Tahitian prawn, marlin, largemouth bass, rainbow wrasse
5	South Africa	25 March 2013	Smallmouth yellowfish, thornfish, stubnose, sand flathead, perch, spotted grunter, great white shark, common snook, hottentot, marlin, sailfish
6	South Australia	1 April 2013	Pink snapper, swallowtail snapper, sweep, silver trevally, King George whiting, bluefin tuna, yabby, Murray cod, Australian salmon, butterfish
7	New Zealand	8 April 2013	Blue cod, kahawai, eel, brown trout, spiny dogfish, sea perch, skate, conger eel
8	Mauritius	15 April 2013	Barracuda, largemouth bass, skipjack tuna, yellowfin tuna, wahoo, bonito

=== Series 3 ===
Episode	Location	Broadcast date	Featured fish
1	Greenland	3 January 2014	Redfish, Atlantic cod, Arctic char, Greenland halibut, spider crab, Greenland shark
2	Tanzania	10 January 2014	Rainbow runner, wahoo, skipjack tuna, dolphin, ruby snapper, rusty jobfish, longhorn cowfish, yellowfin goatfish, dusky grouper, snapper, hippopotamus, African elephant, crocodile, Nile tilapia, Nile perch
3	Canada	17 January 2014	Beaver, Atlantic salmon, muskellunge, bluefin tuna, smallmouth bass, blue shark
4	UAE and Oman	20 January 2014	Yellowspotted trevally, kingfish, barracuda, giant trevally, emperor angelfish, longtail tuna, blacktip trevally, mahi-mahi, brown spotted hamour

== See also ==
- Channel 5 (UK)
- Extreme Fishing with Robson Green
