= Hugh Boyle =

Hugh Boyle may refer to:

- Hugh Charles Boyle (1873–1950), American Roman Catholic bishop
- Hugh Boyle (golfer) (1936–2015), Irish golfer
- Hugh Boyle (trade unionist) (1850–1907), British trade unionist
- Hugh Boyle Ewing (1826–1905), American diplomat, author and lawyer
- Hugh Boyle (bishop) (1897–1986), Bishop of Johannesburg
