= Multistory Media =

British television production company

- Type: Subsidiary
- Industry: Media
- Headquarters: The H Club Studio, The Leeds Studios; MediaCityUK
- Products: Television
- Parent: ITV Studios
- Website: multistory.tv

Multistory Media (formerly known as Shiver) is a British television production company. It is a subsidiary of ITV Studios and one of the largest providers of factual entertainment in the United Kingdom.

Some of its productions include Paul O'Grady: For the Love of Dogs, 60 Minute Makeover and Peter Andre: My Life.

== History ==
Originally, Multistory Media was the factual entertainment and features network production departments of Tyne Tees Television and Yorkshire Television. When ITV plc was created, the separate departments of these two subsidiaries were merged into Yorkshire Television and they were branded as Granada Productions North Factual Entertainment and Features. They were then renamed as the northern factual entertainment and features department within ITV Yorkshire part of ITV Productions. At this point an internal re-organisation took place to disband the management structure of Yorkshire Television and transfer the production business from Yorkshire Television Limited to ITV Productions Limited. The departments were then closed as part of a wider company production review but were re-opened in Leeds as Shiver, a subsidiary of ITV Studios.

On 23 May 2019, Shiver changed their name to Multistory Media.

On 10 October 2025, it was announced that the in-house ITV Studios Daytime division would be merged into Multistory Media, with Lorraine, This Morning and Loose Women being produced by the label beginning in January 2026.

== Selected Productions ==
Programme	Channel	Based at	Years
30 Years of CITV	ITV	The Leeds Studios	2012
Up series	ITV		1964—2019
60 Minute Makeover	ITV (2004–2014); Quest Red (2018)	The London Studios	2004—2018
Ade in Britain	ITV	MediaCityUK	2011–2012
Alexander Armstrong in the Land of the Midnight Sun	ITV		2015
Amazing Animal Births	ITV		2017—
Britain's Darkest Taboos	Crime & Investigation	MediaCityUK	2012—
Channel 4's 30 Greatest Comedy Shows	Channel 4	The Leeds Studios	
Chatsworth	BBC One	MediaCityUK	2012
Come Dine with Me	Channel 4	The London Studios	2005—
Come on Down! The Game Show Story	ITV	The Leeds Studios	2014
Cook Me the Money	ITV	The London Studios	2013
Dance Mums with Jennifer Ellison	Lifetime		
The Big Flower Fight	Netflix		2020–
Drawers Off	Channel 4		2021–
Eat, Shop, Save	ITV		2017—
Emmerdale at 40	ITV	The Leeds Studios	2012
Exposure: The Other Side of Jimmy Savile	ITV	The London Studios	
Fierce	ITV		2016
For the Love of Dogs with Alison Hammond	ITV		2024—
Gibraltar: Britain in the Sun	Channel 5		2013–2014
Gino's Italian Escape	ITV		2013—
Gok's Lunchbox	ITV		2016
Harbour Lives	ITV		2013–2014
Hillsborough: The Search For Truth	BBC One, and ITV		2012
Jimmy and the Whale Whisperer	Channel 4		2012
Katie Price's Pony Club	TLC		2016
Katie Price: My Crazy Life	Quest Red		2017—
Lady C and the Castle	ITV		2016
Last Laugh in Vegas	ITV	The Leeds Studios	2018—
Little England	ITV	The London Studios	2011–2012
Loose Women	ITV	The H Club Studio	2026—
Lorraine	ITV	The H Club Studio	2026—
May The Best House Win	ITV	The Leeds Studios and MediaCityUK	2010–2013
Myleene Klass: Single Mums on Benefits	ITV		2016
Oscar Pistorius: The Interview	ITV		2016
Paul O'Grady: For the Love of Dogs	ITV	The London Studios	2012—2023
Paul O'Grady's Animal Orphans	ITV	The London Studios	2014–2016
Peston on Sunday	ITV	The London Studios	2016—2018
Peston	ITV	The London Studios	2018–
Peter Andre: My Life	ITV2		2011–2013
Life Stories	ITV	The London Studios	2009—
Pride of Britain Awards	ITV	The London Studios	1999—
Real Stories with Ranvir Singh	ITV		2015–2016
Rory Bremner's Great British Views	ITV	MediaCityUK	2013
Scared of the Dark	Channel 4		2023-
Show Me the Telly	ITV	MediaCityUK	2013
Star Treatment	ITV		2013
Stars in their Cars	Travel Channel		2016
Strictly Kosher	ITV	MediaCityUK	
Super Tiny Animals	ITV	MediaCityUK	
Tales from Northumberland with Robson Green	ITV	The Leeds Studios	2013–2016
Tales from the Coast with Robson Green	ITV	The Leeds Studios	2017
The Corrie Years	ITV	The Leeds Studios	2011–2012
The Dales	ITV	MediaCityUK	2011–2013
The Investigator: A British Crime Story	ITV		2016
The Lakes	ITV	MediaCityUK	
The Golden Rules of TV	ITV	MediaCityUK	2012
The Grave Trade		The London Studios	
The Martin Lewis Money Show	ITV	The London Studios	2012—
The Nation's Favourite	ITV	The Leeds Studios and MediaCityUK	2010—
The Talent Show Story	ITV	The Leeds Studios	2012
The Queen and I	ITV	The Leeds Studios	2012
The Royal History of Pop			
This Morning	ITV	The H Club Studio	2026—
Tonight	ITV		2023—
Utterly Outrageous Reality TV Moments of 2012		The Leeds Studios	2012
Weight Loss Ward	ITV	The Leeds Studios	2013–2014
When Ali Came to Britain		MediaCityUK	
Wild Britain with Ray Mears	ITV		2010–2013
William at 30	ITV	MediaCityUK	2012
You Saw Them Here First	ITV		2013—2016
