= Extreme Fishing with Robson Green =

Factual entertainment show

Extreme Fishing with Robson Green is a factual entertainment show broadcast on Channel 5. The show sees actor and fishing enthusiast Robson Green travel around the world in search of the greatest fishing destinations. There have been five series to date. A spin-off series entitled Robson's Extreme Fishing Challenge began airing on 9 April 2012, and a sequel series (Robson Green: Extreme Fisherman), is set to begin on 4 August 2014 on Quest. Extreme Fishing with Robson Green was re-launched for a one-off special episode on 12 February 2021 based in Leicester.

== Series 1 ==
Episode	Location	Broadcast date	Featured catch	Ratings
1	Costa Rica	1 September 2008	Indo-Pacific sailfish, pompano, red snapper, terrestrial crab, tuna, armadillo?, machaca	1.28m
2	Southern US	8 September 2008	Catfish, blue runner, whale shark, blackfin tuna, rainbow runner, amberjack, these hands, Chesapeake blue crab, alligator gar, quillback?, moorhen, barracuda, silky shark	1.29m
3	South Africa	15 September 2008	Hammerhead shark, octopus, lesser guitarfish, blowfish, sardine, squid, yellowtail kingfish, Cape salmon	1.32m
4	Spain & the Azores	22 September 2008	Atlantic blue marlin, escolar?, stingray, parrotfish, wels catfish	1.17m

== Series 2 ==
Episode	Location	Broadcast date	Featured fish	Ratings
1	British Columbia	2 March 2009	White sturgeon, sablefish, prawn, steelhead, coho salmon	1.59m
2	Alaska	9 March 2009	Northern pike, king salmon, Pacific cod, coho salmon, rainbow trout	1.64m
3	New Zealand	16 March 2009	Kahawai, school shark, hapuka, reef shark, frost fish, gurnard, crayfish, rainbow trout, green-lipped mussel	1.35m
4	Northern Australia	23 March 2009	Barramundi, milkfish, sole, prawn, crab, box jellyfish, leopard whipray, blue mackerel, Spanish mackerel, coral trout, purple cod, red snapper, giant trevally	1.73m
5	North Atlantic	30 March 2009	Atlantic bluefin tuna, lobster, striped bass, bluefish, blackfish, steelhead, spiny dogfish	1.79m
6	Southern Australia	6 April 2009	Common octopus, blue-ringed octopus, blue manna crab, gummy shark, abalone, blacklip abalone	1.57m
7	Thailand	13 April 2009	Redtail catfish, alligator gar, arapaima, rohu, Mekong giant catfish, giant freshwater stingray	1.65m
8	Siargao	20 April 2009	Dogtooth tuna, bluefish, dorado, squid, jellyfish	1.58m

== Series 3 - The World Tour: Part 1 ==
Episode	Location	Broadcast date	Featured fish
1	Zimbabwe and Zambia	27 May 2010	Tigerfish, kapenta, vundu, kariba, yellow bream
2	Kenya	28 May 2010	Tiger shark, wahoo, aprion, black marlin, Nile perch, catfish, grouper, silver cyprinid
3	China	31 May 2010	Bighead carp, octopus, catfish, eel, sea cucumber, southern black bream
4	Sri Lanka	1 June 2010	Sardine, mangrove jack, mahseer, black jack

== Series 4 - The World Tour: Part 2 ==
Episode	Location	Broadcast date	Featured fish	Ratings
1	Brazil	1 November 2010	Piranha, peacock bass, arowana, pirarucu	1.57m
2	Senegal and Guinea Bissau	8 November 2010	Dorado, red snapper, horse-eye jack, marbled grouper, leerfish, chevron barracuda, nurse shark	1.64m
3	Cuba	15 November 2010	Sardine, tarpon, bonefish, barracuda, grouper	1.07m
4	Japan	22 November 2010	Fugu, ayu, whelk, sea urchins, white grunt, Atlantic horse mackerel, cutlassfish, oilfish	1.17m
5	Panama	29 November 2010	Peacock bass, tarpon, oyster, dorado, sierra mackerel, yellowfin tuna	Under 1.06m
6	India and The Maldives	6 December 2010	Frogfish, snakehead, catfish, manta ray, whale shark, grouper, bluefish, red snapper, yellow lip	1.18m
7	Florida	13 December 2010	Dorado, remora, Atlantic sailfish, king mackerel, Orinoco sailfin catfish, blue tilapia, manatee, bull shark, crevalle jack	1.26m
8	California	20 December 2010	Blue shark, Humboldt squid, rainbow trout	1.41m

== Series 5 - At the ends of the Earth ==
Episode	Location	Broadcast date	Featured fish	Ratings
1	Ascension Island	12 May 2011	Bluntnose sixgill shark, rock hind grouper, spotted moray, dolphin, blue marlin, black durgon, yellow-fin tuna, deep water bullseye, blackjack, amberjack	1.31m
2	Patagonia	19 May 2011	Dog snapper, Chinook salmon, brown trout, yellow-fin tuna, king crab	1.21m
3	Papua New Guinea	26 May 2011	Papuan black bass, snake mackerel, megapode, rainbow runner, ruby snapper	1.30m
4	Eastern Russia	2 Jun 2011	Northern pike, Arctic char, salmon, stone char, steelhead, Arctic grayling	0.90m
5	New Caledonia	9 Jun 2011	Bigeyed sixgill shark, flame snapper, ornate jobfish, Spanish mackerel, barracuda, silvertip shark, thicklip grey mullet, crab, giant trevally	1.26m
6	Argentina	16 Jun 2011	Short-tailed river stingray, golden dorado, yellow piranha, silver piranha, pacu	1.45m

== Robson's Extreme Fishing Challenge ==
The spin-off series from Extreme Fishing with Robson Green is Robson's Extreme Fishing Challenge where Green heads around the world taking on local fishing champions from that nation. The series started on 9 April 2012.

== Robson Green: Extreme Fisherman ==
With the series moving from channel 5 to Quest, the title was changed to reflect that he is now one of the world's most experienced fishermen, rather than the mere amateur he was before. The series will be based on the same premise as its predecessors, and is produced by the same team. As-yet confirmed locations visited in the upcoming series are Borneo, Mongolia, Japan and the Solomon Islands

== DVD releases ==
The series is distributed on DVD by Acorn Media UK. Series 1, 2 and 3 are available.

Series	Release date
Series 1	
Series 2	
Series 3	9 May 2011
Series 4	16 April 2012
Series 1–3 box set	5 September 2011
