= William Straker =

British trade unionist

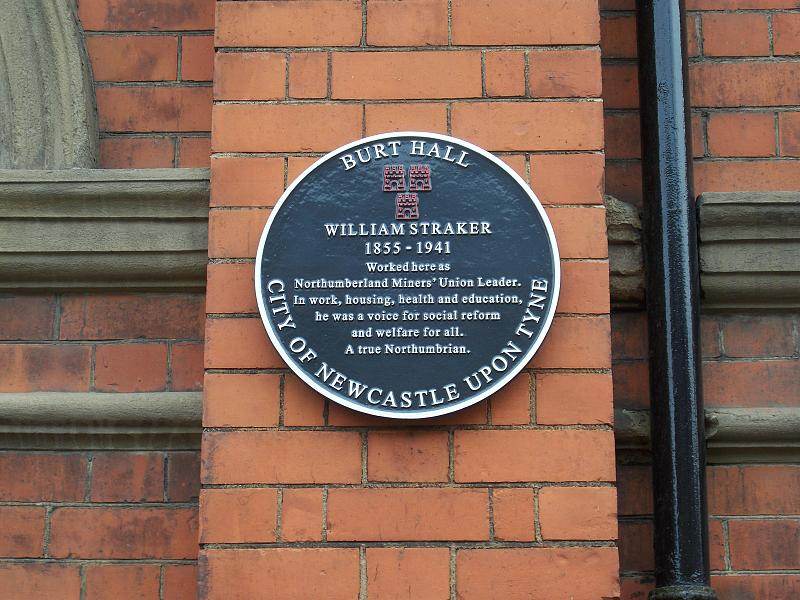
William Straker plaque on Burt Hall

William Straker CBE (13 July 1855 – 31 December 1941) was a British trade unionist.

== Life ==
Born in Snitter, Straker moved to Widdrington at an early age and began working at the local colliery. He was a Primitive Methodist, known for his teetotalism. He became active in the Northumberland Miners' Association and was elected to its executive in 1882, then became its Corresponding Secretary in 1905. This post was renamed as the General Secretary in 1913, serving until 1935.

Straker had an unusual set of views. He opposed almost all strikes, approving only of the 1912 stoppage. In 1914 he was chosen to be the Labour Party candidate at Wansbeck to run against the sitting Liberal MP Charles Fenwick, who was a leader of the Northumberland Miners' Association. However, the outbreak of war postponed the election and Straker was later replaced as candidate. Despite his opposition to militancy, he also opposed the expulsion of communists from the Labour Party, and he strongly opposed World War I, leading some newspapers to campaign for his removal. He was appointed a CBE in 1930.

Trade union offices
Preceded by Thomas Burt	Secretary of the Northumberland Miners' Association; 1905–1935	Succeeded by Jim Bowman
Preceded by John Robertson and Ben Smith	Auditor of the Trades Union Congress; 1920; With: Walter Smith	Succeeded by David Grenfell and Samuel Lomax
