= Unconditional Love (2003 film) =

- Genre: Crime drama
- Written by: Chris Lang
- Directed by: Ferdinand Fairfax
- Starring: Robson Green; Joe Absolom; Sarah Parish; Timothy Krause; Kaye Wragg; Peter Capaldi; Shaun Parkes; Howard Ward
- Country of origin: United Kingdom
- Original language: English
- No. of episodes: 1

Production
- Executive producers: Steve Christian; George Faber; Sandra Jobling; Charles Pattinson
- Producers: Mark Pybus; Bill Shephard
- Editor: Steve Singleton
- Running time: 120 minutes
- Production companies: Coastal Productions; Company Pictures

Original release
- Network: ITV
- Release: 20 January 2003

Unconditional Love is a one-off British crime drama television film that was broadcast on 20 January 2003 on ITV1. Written by Chris Lang, the production starred Robson Green, Joe Absolom, Sarah Parish and Timothy Krause, and follows the story of a couple whose four-year-old son is kidnapped, and his captor demands that they commit a series of crimes in order to secure his safe return. The drama was directed by Ferdinand Fairfax and produced by Mark Pybus.

== Plot ==
Pete (Robson Green) & Lydia Gray (Sarah Parish) are out celebrating their son Max (Timothy Krause)'s fourth birthday, when they become involved in one of every parent's worst nightmares; as Max is snatched by embittered Benjamin Cain (Joe Absolom), his half-brother, who since his birth in 1982, has endured various degrees of abuse, perversion, abandonment, addiction and betrayal. He now has concocted a plan to gain revenge on his abusers and his so-called loving birth parent, who gave him up for adoption, leaving him to the mercy of those who exploited the system, just so they could abuse their positions of power and indulge in their perverted pleasures of pedophilia.

== Cast ==
- Robson Green as Pete Gray
- Sarah Parish as Lydia Gray
- Joe Absolom as Benjamin Cain
- Timothy Krause as Max Gray
- Peter Capaldi as D.I. Terry Machin
- Kaye Wragg as D.S. Hayley Greene
- Shaun Parkes as D.S. Steve Webber
- Howard Ward as Mike Farley
- Ross Gurney-Randall as Kelly
- Anatol Yusef as the Security Guard
- Jean Trend as the Nursery Teacher
- Valerie Mikita as the Singer
