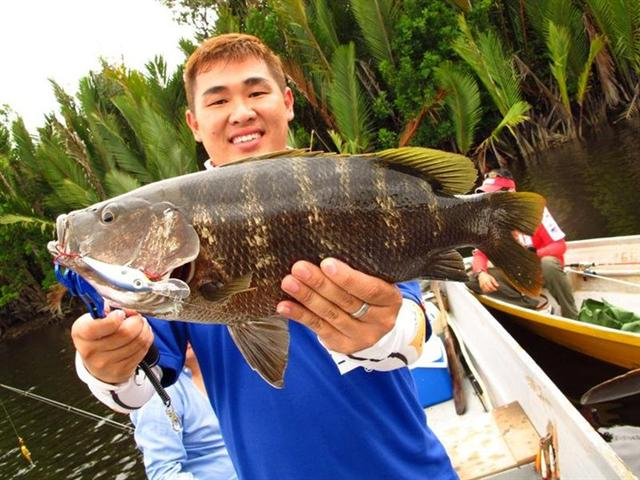

Scientific classification
- Kingdom: Animalia
- Phylum: Chordata
- Class: Actinopterygii
- Division: Teleostei
- Order: Acanthuriformes
- Family: Lutjanidae
- Genus: Lutjanus
- Species: L. goldiei

Binomial name
- Lutjanus goldiei (W.J. Macleay, 1882)

Synonyms
- Mesoprion goldiei Macleay, 1882

= Lutjanus goldiei =

Species of fish

Lutjanus goldiei, the Papuan black snapper, Papuan black bass, New Guinea bass or Niugini black bass, is a species of freshwater and brackish water ray-finned fish, a snapper in the family Lutjanidae. It is found in the western Pacific Ocean.

== Taxonomy ==
Lutjanus goldiei was first formally described in 1882 as Mesoprion goldiei by the Scots born Australian naturalist William John Macleay with the type locality given as Hood Bay in Papua New Guinea. The specific name honours the Scots-born merchant, naturalist and New Guinea explorer Andrew Goldie (1840-1891) who provided Macleay with specimens and accompanying notes.

== Description ==
Lutjanus goldiei has a relatively deep body which has a standard length which is 2.2 to 2.8 times its depth. The forehead is steeply sloped and the incision and knob on the preoperculum are weak. The vomerine teeth are arranged in a crescent-shaped patch with no rearwards extension and there is a patch of grain-like teeth on the tongue. It has a large eye which has reddish yellow iris and a large black pupil. The dorsal fin has 10 spines and 13-14 soft rays while the anal fin has 3 spines and 8 soft rays, the rear profile of both these fins is rounded. The pectoral fins contain 16-17 rays and the caudal fin is truncate. This fish attains a maximum total length of 100 cm (39 in), although 60 cm (24 in) is more typical, and the maximum published weight is 19.2 kg (42 lb). Papuan black snappers come in two colour phases, one with the whole body being blackish in colour and the other which is marked with 6-7 wide greyish bars on the flanks. The juveniles are always barred.

== Distribution and habitat ==
Lutjanus goldiei was thought to be confined to southern New Guinea between Port Moresby and the Fly River. However, it has now been found to occur in Sabah on the Malaysian part of Borneo and possibly other islands between New Guinea and Borneo. This species has been found in both brackish and fresh waters, in southern New Guinea they have been recorded inhabiting streams and rivers which drain into the Gulf of Papua and in northern New Guinea they are known from the Sepik and Ramu river system. In the Fly river, it has been found inland some 828 km (514 mi) from the sea, but normally it is found 200 to 400 km (120 to 250 mi) from the sea. It has also been recorded from brackish water estuarine environments.

== Biology ==
Lutjanus goldiei are opportunistic predators which have been recorded preying on crabs, snakes, fishes, small crocodiles and mammals. Little is known about these species but juvelines have been seen to reside further up the rivers and in shallower areas for protection. The juveniles are also found in mangroves. It is thought that the larvae may be marine but there are no records of this species in purely marine environments.

== Fisheries ==
Lutjanus goldiei is a popular sporting fish and a safari-angling economy has grown around its pursuit. Game fishers go to both New Guinea and Sabah to fish for this species. It occasionally appears in the fish market at Port Moresby. Apart from angling for this species it is also caught using spears, handlines, traps and gill nets. This species has not been evaluated by the IUCN. Anglers from across the globe have the Papuan Black Bass on their fishing bucket list and there are a few tour operators that target these species specifically.

== Fishing shows ==
Lutjanus goldiei was featured in "Volcanic Island Terror", the fifth episode of the ninth and final season of the TV series River Monsters hosted by Jeremy Wade, which first broadcast in the United States on 21 May 2017. It was also featured in episode 3 of the fifth season of Extreme Fishing with Robson Green.
