= The Talent Show Story =

- Genre: Entertainment; Documentary
- Narrated by: Victoria Wood
- Country of origin: United Kingdom
- Original language: English
- No. of series: 1
- No. of episodes: 5

Production
- Running time: 60 minutes (inc. adverts)
- Production companies: Shiver Productions and Thames

Original release
- Network: ITV
- Release: 7 January – 4 February 2012

Related
- ITV Specials

The Talent Show Story is a British television documentary series about the history of British television talent shows. The series comprises five episodes and was broadcast on ITV from 7 January to 4 February 2012. It is narrated by Victoria Wood. It was produced by Shiver Productions.

== Episode list ==
- Episode 1: Exploring the history of televised talent contests, from the original Opportunity Knocks to today's super-slick shows such as The X Factor. The first edition includes Susan Boyle discussing her 2009 breakthrough on Britain's Got Talent, and examines Will Young's defeat of Gareth Gates in 2002's Pop Idol, and how the noughties series Popstars ushered in a new era of programmes. There is also a tribute to former New Faces host Marti Caine and a contribution by ex-judge Nina Myskow.
- Episode 2: How Britain's Got Talent brought variety back to the nation's TV screens, and Simon Cowell's transition from music mogul to household name. The programme also looks at the role of 1970s show New Faces in bringing the judging panel to television talent shows. With contributions by Nigel Lythgoe, Ant & Dec, Gary Barlow, Piers Morgan, Tony Hatch, Dermot O'Leary, Nina Myskow, Amanda Holden, Lenny Henry, Les Dennis, Alexandra Burke, JLS, Kelly Rowland and One Direction.
- Episode 3: Britain's Got Talent hosts Ant & Dec and The X Factor's Dermot O'Leary discuss the changing nature of the talent-show presenter, and the programme celebrates some of the genre's most unlikely stars, including singing acts Jedward, Wagner and the Cheeky Girls. There is also a look back at Opportunity Knocks and the life of its host Hughie Green.
- Episode 4: Simon Cowell, Dannii Minogue, Gary Barlow, Dermot O'Leary, One Direction and JLS discuss how The X Factor became one of TV's most successful formats. The programme also explores the role of talent show child stars such as Lena Zavaroni, and examines how Britain's Got Talent helped younger performers return to the genre in the noughties. Plus, a clip of comedian Joe Pasquale in 1987's nail-biting New Faces final.
- Episode 5: Amanda Holden, Piers Morgan, Pete Waterman, Dannii Minogue, Gary Barlow, Tulisa and Louis Walsh talk about life on the judging panel. Plus, how Pop Idol made Simon Cowell a Saturday night superstar, and the success of Britain's Got Talent's dance acts such as Diversity and Spelbound.

== See also ==
- ITV Specials
