= Robson Green's Wild Swimming Adventure =

- Starring: Robson Green
- Country of origin: United Kingdom
- Original language: English
- No. of series: 1
- No. of episodes: 2

Production
- Production location: United Kingdom
- Production company: Tiger Aspect Productions

Original release
- Network: ITV
- Release: 8 December – 15 December 2009

Robson Green's Wild Swimming Adventure is a two-part documentary series in which Robson Green explores and swims in bodies of water in Britain. It aired on ITV in December 2009.

== Episodes ==
No.	Title	Original release date
1	"Part 1"	8 December 2009
Robson Green starts his wild swimming adventure in the river that dominated the area where he was raised – the Tyne.
2	"Part 2"	15 December 2009
Robson's next stop on his journey is a location that is surrounded by myths and legends – Loch Ness.
