= Sir Jim Bowman, 1st Baronet =

British trade unionist and businessman

Sir James Bowman, 1st Baronet, KBE (8 March 1898 – 25 September 1978) was a British trade unionist.

Born in Great Corby, near Carlisle, Bowman worked at Ashington colliery from the age of fifteen. He served in the Royal Marines during World War I, then returned to coal mining, where he became active in the Northumberland Miners' Association. He became General Secretary of the union in 1935, and Vice President of the Miners' Federation of Great Britain in 1939, holding the post unopposed until 1949, during which period he took a leading role in reorganising the union into the National Union of Mineworkers.

Bowman advised in reforming the German trade unions after World War II. He also served on the 1947 Royal Commission on the Press, and Beveridge's committee on broadcasting. He withdrew from trade unionism at the end of 1949, instead taking a National Coal Board post; in 1956, he was appointed its chairman. Bowman was appointed a Commander of the Order of the British Empire (CBE) in the 1952 Birthday Honours, and was promoted to Knight Commander (KBE) in the 1957 Birthday Honours. He stood down in 1961, due to ill health. In the 1961 New Year Honours Bowman was created as a baronet.

Trade union offices
Preceded by William Straker	General Secretary of the Northumberland Miners' Association; 1935–1950	Succeeded by Robert Main
Preceded by Will Lawther	Vice President of the Miners' Federation of Great Britain; 1939–1945	Position abolished
New post	Vice President of the National Union of Mineworkers; 1945–1949	Succeeded by Ernest Jones
Government offices
Preceded by Hubert Houldsworth	Chairman of the National Coal Board; 1956–1961	Succeeded by Alfred Robens
Baronetage of the United Kingdom
New creation	Baronet (of Killingworth); 1961–1978	Succeeded by George Bowman
