= Jack Besford =

British trade unionist

Jack Besford (20 November 1891 – 29 November 1975) was a trade unionist in Britain.

Born in Amble, Northumberland, Besford went down the coal mine at the age of 13.

He was elected Financial Secretary of the Woodhorn Branch of the Northumberland Miners' Mutual Confident Association in 1917. Following a short period as vice-president, he was elected President of the branch in 1924, a position which he retained until 1939, when he was elected as Financial Secretary of the Northumberland Miners' Association.

Besford took on a national and international role in the post-war years, becoming a member of the National Executive of the National Union of Mineworkers, as well as being a UK delegate to meetings of the Miners' International Federation. He was regularly featured in newspaper articles, and was frequently photographed alongside UK political leaders on their visits to north east England.

Besford was a supporter of the Labour Party, and was the runner-up in the voting to select the parliamentary candidate for Morpeth in 1935.

Besford successfully campaigned for free secondary education for all children in Northumberland, with selection based on merit rather than the ability of parents to pay. This was secured in February 1939 after a long campaign which he conducted via Northumberland Education Committee, Northumberland County Council, and public meetings.

== Personal life ==
Besford married Agnes Hewit on 9 September 1914 and had two children.

Trade union offices
Preceded by John Carr	Financial Secretary of the Northumberland Miners' Association; 1939–1945	Succeeded by became Northumberland Area of National Union of Mineworkers
