= William Weir (trade unionist) =

British trade unionist

William Weir (June 1868 – December 1926) was a British trade unionist.

Born in Mickley Square, Northumberland, Weir studied at Prudhoe Colliery School and then worked at West Wylam Colliery from the age of twelve. He soon became active in the Northumberland Miners' Association, and was elected branch president in 1905, then to the county executive in 1912. In 1914, he became President of the union, serving until 1926.

Weir was a Primitive Methodist. He was also elected to Prudhoe parish council, then its successor urban district council, and later to Gosforth UDC, initially as a Lib-Lab, then later for the Labour Party. He was also an alderman on Northumberland County Council, and stood unsuccessfully in the 1918 general election in Hexham.

Trade union offices
Preceded by Joseph English	President of the Northumberland Miners' Association; 1914–1926	Succeeded by William Golightly
