= William Golightly =

British politician

William Golightly (1875 – 18 September 1940) was a British trade unionist and politician.

Born in Felling, Golightly began working underground at Seghill Colliery at an early age. He gradually progressed to become a deputy-overman, serving for eight years until he resigned in protest at the management methods he was asked to use. He was active in the Northumberland Miners' Association, acting as a branch delegate for thirty years, and he served on the union's executive for three years.

Golightly served in the British Army in France during World War I, then returned to mining. He was elected to Seghill Council, and then later also to Northumberland County Council, representing the Labour Party. In 1927, he was elected as the president of the Northumberland Miners' Association. The union was affiliated to the Miners' Federation of Great Britain, and Golightly served on its executive from 1939. He also served as the union's compensation secretary, in which role he was known as being efficient but strict.

In 1940, Golightly travelled to the United States on the SS City of Benares. The ship was hit by a torpedo and sank, killing Golightly.

In his spare time, Golightly was a Methodist lay preacher, and he also served on the Co-operative Wages Board. His descendants include the actor Robson Green.

Trade union offices
| Preceded by William Weir | President of the Northumberland Miners' Association; 1927–1940 | Succeeded by Hugh McKay |
