= Little England (TV series) =

- Narrated by: Geoffrey Palmer
- Country of origin: United Kingdom
- Original language: English
- No. of series: 2
- No. of episodes: 20

Production
- Production locations: Dordogne, France
- Running time: 30 minutes (inc. adverts)
- Production company: Shiver Productions

Original release
- Network: ITV
- Release: 12 September 2011 – 17 December 2012

Little England is a British documentary show that aired on ITV from 12 September 2011 to 17 December 2012 and was narrated by Geoffrey Palmer.

== Transmissions ==
Series	Start date	End date	Episodes
1	12 September 2011	5 December 2011	12
2	23 October 2012	17 December 2012	8
