= Robson Green =

British actor (born 1964)

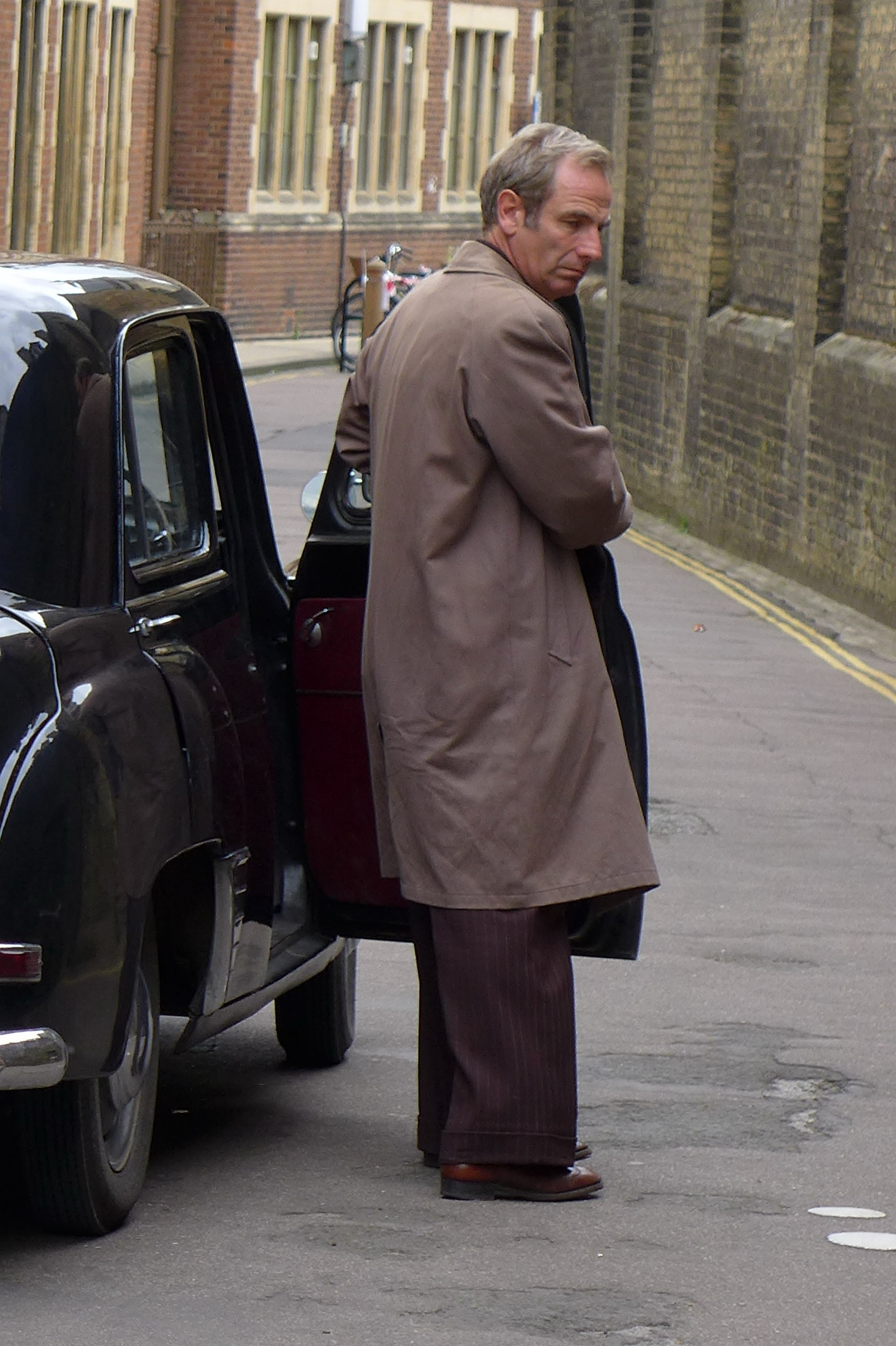
- Green filming Grantchester in September 2015
- Born: Robson Golightly Green; 18 December 1964 (age 61); Hexham, England
- Occupations: Actor, musician, presenter
- Years active: 1989–present
- Family: William Golightly (great-grandfather)

Robson Golightly Green (born 18 December 1964) is an English actor, singer-songwriter and television presenter.

His first major TV role was as hospital porter Jimmy Powell in BBC drama series Casualty in 1989. He then went on to portray Fusilier Dave Tucker in the ITV military drama series Soldier Soldier, between 1991 and 1995. In 1997 he played Dr. Owen Springer in drama serial Reckless, and starred as Dr. Tony Hill in the ITV crime drama series Wire in the Blood (2002-2008). Since 2014, he has played Detective Inspector George "Geordie" Keating in ITV's detective period drama Grantchester.

As a TV presenter he has fronted shows such as Extreme Fishing, Extreme Fishing Challenge and Tales from Northumberland. He was one half of the singing duo Robson & Jerome, along with fellow Soldier Soldier actor Jerome Flynn, who had several No. 1 singles in the 1990s.

== Early life ==
Robson Golightly Green was born on 18 December 1964 in Dilston Hospital in Hexham, Northumberland, and grew up in Dudley, a small mining village south of Cramlington. His father, also named Robson Green, was a miner, and his mother Anne was a cleaner and shopkeeper. He was named in the Northeast tradition of naming the first son after family surnames: Robson was his paternal grandmother's maiden name, while his middle name, Golightly, is the surname of his maternal grandmother, Cissie Golightly, daughter of William Golightly, a miner and well-known trade union leader in the 1920s.

Green attended Dudley Middle Comprehensive School. After being inspired by jets flying overhead, he decided he wanted to join the Royal Air Force, and at the age of 16, he joined the Air Training Corps, though he decided against a career in the RAF after two weeks at an officer training camp. He also learned to play the guitar, later forming his first band, Solid State, in 1982. He also spent one night a week at the Backworth Drama Centre, and appeared in a series of productions at both school and Backworth.

Green left school aged 16 with five O-levels, and joined Swan Hunter's shipyard as a draughtsman. On one occasion, he also tried his hand at professional boxing. He attended three boxing training sessions for the play Francie Nichol, in which he played a boxer. After two years at Swan's, Green decided on a career in acting. After auditioning, he began training with Live Theatre under the tutelage of artistic director Max Roberts, his previous director at Backworth. During training he continued his musical career as a member of a successful local band, the Workie Tickets.

== Career ==
Growing up in Tyneside, Green was chosen to be the lead in a series of short videos made by Amber Films that narrated the contemporaneous social problems faced by working-class people in Thatcher's Britain. Each episode examined one aspect of living in a harsh and embittered environment. The soap opera gave Green his big break in film. It was quickly followed by offers of work. Green first made his name as an actor in the BBC series Casualty but, after three series, moved to national prominence as Fusilier Dave Tucker in the drama series Soldier Soldier.

In 1995, one episode called for Green and co-star Jerome Flynn to sing "Unchained Melody". Subsequently, ITV was inundated by people wanting to buy the song and the pair were persuaded by Simon Cowell to release it as a single – a double A-side with "White Cliffs of Dover". It stayed at No. 1 for seven weeks in the UK Singles Chart, selling more than 1.8 million copies and making it the best-selling single of the year and winning the duo the Music Week Awards in 1996 for best single and best album. Subsequently, they had two further No. 1 singles and two No. 1 albums, all remakes of standards.

The song gave Green the opportunity to sign a long-term deal with ITV to star in several of the network's dramas, including Touching Evil, Grafters and Reckless. In 1996, he set up an independent production company, Coastal Productions, with business partner Sandra Jobling to give youngsters from the North East the opportunities he struggled for. The company has since produced or co-produced most of Green's television work, as well as local productions at the Theatre Royal in Newcastle upon Tyne. In 2002, Green starred as clinical psychologist Dr. Tony Hill in the crime drama Wire in the Blood.

Green's production company has brought at least four new dramas to the small screen in recent years, including the massive ratings hit Christmas Lights. The success of this one-off drama led to a series being commissioned under the name Northern Lights, which was followed by a sequel called City Lights. Coastal also produces drama series, including Hereafter starring Stephen Tompkinson and Dervla Kirwan.

In 1995, Green won the Smash Hits Poll Winner's Party award for Favourite TV Actor. In 1997, Green starred in the TV film, The Student Prince which is no relation to either the Romberg operetta or the 1954 MGM film.

In July 1998, Green received an honorary degree from the University of Northumbria and, in September 2006, he was voted by the UK general public at No. 35 in a poll of TV's greatest stars.

In 2000, Green starred with James Bolam, Susan Jameson, Kerry Ann Christiansen and Jamie Bell in the ITV drama Close and True. In 2001, he starred in the six-part ITV drama Take Me.

In 2002, Green starred with Caroline Goodall in the TV movie Me and Mrs. Jones. In December 2002, he released his first solo album, Moment in Time, which was composed of cover versions (including the song "Me and Mrs. Jones"). However, unlike his releases with Jerome Flynn, the album was a commercial failure, peaking at No. 49 in the UK.

In 2003, Green starred in the ITV mini-series Unconditional Love and in the BBC television series Trust. In 2005, he starred in two series, Like Father Like Son, and Rocket Man in which he played a widower trying to build a rocket to send his dead wife's ashes into space.

Green presents his own series Extreme Fishing with Robson Green and the spin-off Robson's Extreme Fishing Challenge, where he travels over the world investigating and participating in the sport, coining fishing catchphrases such as "get in" and "we're in". During 2009, while promoting the second series on BBC Breakfast, Green claimed that 90% of all coarse fish caught by anglers die. This rapidly caused an angry response from coarse fishing anglers in the UK who believed this comment to be unsubstantiated and potentially damaging to the sport.

In December 2009, ITV presented the documentary Robson Green's Wild Swimming Adventure, a tour of swimming locales around the UK.

In 2010 Green had a major role in the television film Joe Maddison's War. Directed by Patrick Collerton, it presented a view of World War II through the eyes of shipyard workers and World War I veterans who served in the Home Guard during the Blitz.

In July 2010, Green began filming the seventh series of BBC drama Waterloo Road appearing from May 2011 to July 2011.

In 2011, Green appeared in the third series of the BBC Three show Being Human in which he played a werewolf named McNair.

In 2013 and 2015, Green starred in the fourth and fifth series of the war-drama series Strike Back, as Lt Colonel Philippe Locke, a former SAS operative.

In October 2013, Green began presenting Tales from Northumberland with Robson Green on ITV, a factual series about his home county of Northumberland. A second series began airing in February 2015 and a third in February 2016.

Since 2014, he has portrayed Geordie Keating in the ITV drama series Grantchester, starring alongside James Norton, later Tom Brittney, and then Rishi Nair. A second series began in March 2016 and a third in April 2017.

In March 2016, during an appearance on The One Show, Green confirmed he would present a new series for ITV called Tales from the Coast with Robson Green, which began airing in January 2017. In April 2016, he presented a one-off documentary The Flying Scotsman with Robson Green. He also presented a one-off documentary Robson Crusoe: A Surprising Adventure and a six-part series called Robson Green's Coastal Lives, both for ITV.

In 2020, Green began recording Hadrian's Wall with Robson Green a 3-part documentary following him walking the 80 miles from Wallsend west to Bowness. The series was commissioned by Channel 5 and made by Firecracker Films.

== Politics ==
Green is a supporter of higher taxes on the wealthy and protecting the NHS, saying "Anybody who tells me they’re not going to pay tax… we’ve got an NHS system on its knees… I tell you what, my son was in real trouble when he was young and we took him to the hospital, there were four specialists waiting for him. That’s why you pay your taxes. We’ve got a police system who protect us, we’ve got firemen who put out fires. We’ve got defence, man. That’s what tax is for." He then went on to claim "I’m proud to be a 50 per cent tax-payer". He has also been an outspoken critic of Jimmy Carr for using a tax avoidance scheme in 2012. He said of Carr, "Wanker. I mean, just wanker. No, he’s not getting away with it for me".

== Personal life ==
Green was brought up in Ashington where his father was a miner. He is a supporter of Newcastle United and a season ticket holder at the club.

Green was introduced to occupational therapist Alison Ogilvie by his close friend, television director Andrew Gunn. Green and Ogilvie married on 22 June 1991, but separated eight years later. Green met his second wife, former Page 3 model Vanya Seager, while recording "Unchained Melody" at BMG Records in 1995. They later had a son, Taylor Seager-Green (born 2000). In 2001, the couple married at Cliveden House in Buckinghamshire after a family celebration in Mauritius. On 30 October 2011, the couple issued a statement saying that their marriage had "irretrievably broken down" and that they were separating. In April 2016 it was reported that Green was involved in an affair causing the break-down of a marriage between a vicar and his wife.

== Filmography ==
=== Film ===
Year	Title	Role	Notes
1988	Shields Stories	Derek	
1989	A Night on the Tyne	Dudley	
2002	Me & Mrs Jones	Liam Marple	

=== Television ===
Year	Title	Role	Network
1989–1992	Casualty	Jimmy Powell	BBC One
1991–1995	Soldier Soldier	Fusilier Dave Tucker	ITV
1995	The Gambling Man	Rory Connor	ITV
1997	Reckless	Owen Springer	ITV
1997	Ain't Misbehavin'	Eric Trapp	ITV
1997	The Student Prince	Barry Grimes	BBC One
1997–1999	Touching Evil	D.I. Dave Creegan	ITV
1998	Reckless: The Sequel	Owen Springer	ITV
1998–1999	Grafters	Joe Purvis	ITV
1999	Rhinoceros	Michael Flynn	ITV
2000	The Last Musketeer	Steve McTear	ITV
2000	Blind Ambition	Richard Thomas	ITV
2000	Close and True	John Close	ITV
2001	Take Me	Jack Chambers	ITV
2002–2008	Wire in the Blood	Dr. Tony Hill	ITV
2003	Unconditional Love	Pete Gray	ITV
2003	Trust	Stephen Bradley	BBC One
2004	The Afternoon Play	Oliver Barrett	BBC One
2004	Christmas Lights	Colin Armstrong	ITV
2005	Like Father Like Son	Dominic Milne	ITV
2005	Beaten	Michael	BBC
2005	Rocket Man	George Stevenson	BBC One
2006	Northern Lights	Colin Armstrong	ITV
2007	Little Devil	Will Crowe	ITV
2007	City Lights	Colin Armstrong	ITV
2008	Clash of the Santas	Colin Armstrong	ITV
2008	The Aptly Named Father Feely	Fr John Feely	
2008–2011	Extreme Fishing with Robson Green	Non-fiction	Channel 5
2009	Robson Green's Wild Swimming Adventure	Non-fiction	ITV
2010	Joe Maddison's War	Harry Crawford	ITV
2011	Being Human	McNair	BBC Three
2011	Waterloo Road	Rob Scotcher	BBC One
2012	Mount Pleasant	Chris	Sky Living
2012–2014	Robson's Extreme Fishing Challenge	Non-fiction	Channel 5
2013	Robson Green: How The North Was Built	Non-fiction	ITV
2013–2015	Strike Back	Lt. Colonel Philip Locke	Sky One
2013–2016	Tales from Northumberland with Robson Green	Non-fiction	ITV
2014	Robson Green: Extreme Fisherman	Non-fiction	Quest
2014–present	Grantchester	George "Geordie" Keating	ITV
2015	Robson Green's Ultimate Catch	Non-fiction	Quest
2016	The Flying Scotsman with Robson Green	Non-fiction	ITV
2017	Robson Crusoe: A Surprising Adventure	Non-fiction	ITV
2017	Tales from the Coast with Robson Green	Non-fiction	ITV
2017	Robson Green's Coastal Lives	Non-fiction	ITV
2018	Age Before Beauty	Teddy	BBC One
2020	Walking Hadrian's Wall with Robson Green	Non-fiction	Channel 5
2021	Robson and Jim’s Icelandic Fly Fishing Adventure	Non-fiction	ITV
2021	Robson Green: Coastal Fishing	Non-fiction	Channel 5
2023	Robson and Jim’s British Fly Fishing Adventure	Non-fiction	ITV4
2023–present	Robson Green’s Weekend Escapes	Non-fiction	BBC Two
2024	The Amazon with Robson Green	Non-fiction	Channel 5
2025–2026	The Game	Patrick Harbottle	Channel 5
2025	World’s Most Amazing Walks with Robson Green	Non-fiction	U&Yesterday
2026	The Northumbria Mysteries	Joe Ruby	BBC One

== See also ==
- Robson & Jerome
