= Tales from Northumberland with Robson Green =

- Also known as: More/Further Tales from Northumberland with Robson Green
- Genre: Documentary
- Presented by: Robson Green
- Country of origin: United Kingdom
- Original language: English
- No. of series: 3
- No. of episodes: 24

Production
- Running time: 30 minutes (inc. adverts)
- Production company: Shiver Productions

Original release
- Network: ITV
- Release: 28 October 2013 – 18 April 2016

Related
- James Nesbitt's Ireland; Cornwall with Caroline Quentin

Tales from Northumberland with Robson Green is a British documentary series which sees Robson Green travel around his home county of Northumberland in the North of England.

== Transmissions ==
Tales from Northumberland

| Series | Start date | End date | Episodes |
|---|---|---|---|
| 1 | 28 October 2013 | 23 December 2013 | 8 |
| 2 | 16 February 2015 | 6 April 2015 | 8 |
| 3 | 29 February 2016 | 18 April 2016 | 8 |

Tales from the Coast

| Series | Start date | End date | Episodes |
|---|---|---|---|
| 1 | 31 January 2017 | 21 February 2017 | 4 |

=== Episodes ===
Series 1

The first series aired from 28 October until 16 December 2013.

| Episode No. | Original air date | Viewers (millions) | ITV weekly ranking |
|---|---|---|---|
| 1 | 28 October 2013 | 3.25 | 21 |
| 2 | 4 November 2013 | 3.28 | 23 |
| 3 | 11 November 2013 | 3.30 | 19 |
| 4 | 18 November 2013 | 3.29 | 25 |
| 5 | 29 November 2013 | 3.10 | 26 |
| 6 | 2 December 2013 | 3.27 | 25 |
| 7 | 16 December 2013 | 2.98 | 21 |
| 8 | 23 December 2013 | 3.08 | 27 |

Series 2

The second series aired from 16 February until 6 April 2015. The series was titled More Tales from Northumberland with Robson Green.

| Episode No. | Original air date | Viewers (millions) | ITV weekly ranking |
|---|---|---|---|
| 1 | 16 February 2015 | 2.79 | 23 |
| 2 | 23 February 2015 | Under 2.54 | N/A |
| 3 | 2 March 2015 | Under 2.54 | N/A |
| 4 | 9 March 2015 | Under 2.54 | N/A |
| 5 | 16 March 2015 | 3.13 | 20 |
| 6 | 23 March 2015 | Under 2.41 | N/A |
| 7 | 30 March 2015 | Under 2.46 | N/A |
| 8 | 6 April 2015 | 2.64 | 22 |

Series 3

The third series began airing on 29 February 2016 and was titled Further Tales from Northumberland with Robson Green.

| Episode No. | Original air date | Viewers (millions) | ITV weekly ranking |
|---|---|---|---|
| 1 | 29 February 2016 | Under 2.80 | N/A |
| 2 | 7 March 2016 | Under 2.71 | N/A |
| 3 | 14 March 2016 | Under 2.25 | N/A |
| 4 | 21 March 2016 | 3.13 | 20 |
| 5 | 28 March 2016 | Under 2.41 | N/A |
| 6 | 4 April 2016 | Under 2.46 | N/A |
| 7 | 11 April 2016 | 2.64 | 22 |
| 8 | 18 April 2016 | Under 2.23 | N/A |

== Tales from the Coast with Robson Green ==
| Episode No. | Original air date | Locations featured | Viewers (millions) | ITV weekly ranking |
|---|---|---|---|---|
| 1 | 31 January 2017 | Ilfracombe, Clovelly & Lundy | | |
| 2 | 7 February 2017 | Pembrokeshire | | |
| 3 | 14 February 2017 | Outer Hebrides | 3.14 | 30 |
| 4 | 21 February 2017 | Essex and Suffolk | | |

== DVD release ==
The Region 2 DVD for the first series was released on 6 January 2014.
