= Thomas Burt =

British politician

The Right Honourable Thomas Burt
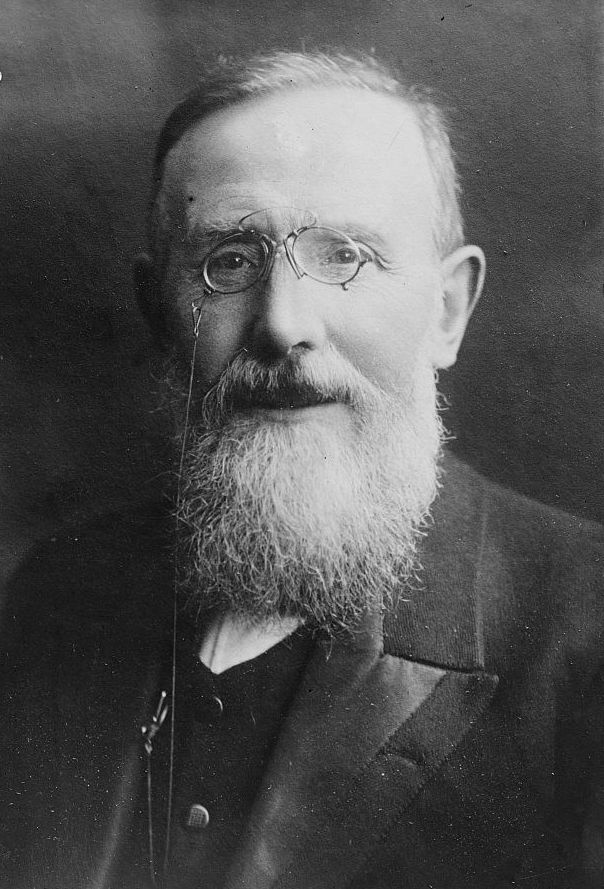
- Burt c. 1913

Parliamentary Secretary to the Board of Trade
- In office 18 August 1892 – 21 June 1895
- Monarch: Victoria
- Prime Minister: William Ewart Gladstone; The Earl of Rosebery
- Preceded by: The Lord Balfour of Burleigh
- Succeeded by: The Earl of Dudley

Personal details
- Born: 12 November 1837 Murton Row, near Backworth, Northumberland, UK
- Died: 12 April 1922 (aged 84)
- Party: Liberal (Lib-Lab)

Thomas Burt PC (12 November 1837 – 12 April 1922) was a British trade unionist and one of the first working-class Members of Parliament.

== Career ==
Burt became secretary of the Northumberland Miners' Association in 1863, then, in 1874, was returned to parliament for Morpeth, alongside Alexander MacDonald, a fellow miners' leader. Burt stood as a Radical labour candidate with Liberal support and formed part of a small group of Liberal–Labour politicians in the House of Commons in the 1880s and 1890s. After the 1892 General Election, William Ewart Gladstone appointed Burt as Parliamentary Secretary to the Board of Trade, in which capacity he served until 1895.

Despite the emergence of the Independent Labour Party and the Labour Representation Committee, Burt remained loyal to his backers in the Liberal Party and refused to join. He was sworn of the Privy Council in 1906 and continued to represent Morpeth in Parliament until 1918. From 1910 to 1918 he was Father of the House in the House of Commons.

Burt resigned as general secretary of the Northumberland Miners' Association in 1913.

== Personal life ==
Thomas Burt was born at Murton Row, near Backworth, in the county of Northumberland, on 12 November 1837. His father, Peter Burt, was at this time working as a coal hewer for the Backworth Coal Company. At the age of 10 Burt's working life began as a trapper boy at the Haswell Pit. With only approximately two years schooling and at the age of 17 Burt decided "how utterly ignorant I was and when I was seized with an eager desire for knowledge and mental improvement". In 1860 Burt married Mary Weatherburn and in the 1881 census they were listed as having three daughters and three sons; Rebecca aged 20, Mary aged 13, Thomas aged 11, Peter aged 8, Jane aged 6 and Wilfred aged 1. Poor health led to Burt's retirement from politics in 1918. During the final three years of his life he was bed-ridden. Burt died on 12 April 1922, aged 84 and was buried in Jesmond Cemetery which was in the neighbourhood of his residence in Newcastle upon Tyne. On 12 April 2014 a re-dedication of the Thomas Burt Memorial took place in Jesmond Cemetery.

== Politics ==
Thomas Burt c. 1895

Formation of the Northumberland Miners' Mutual Confident Association which became the Northumberland Miners' Association. In 1865 Burt was elected executive secretary of the Northumberland Miner's Mutual Confident Association. Continuing as General Secretary of the association for the next fifty years. Burt was guest speaker at the 2nd Durham Miners' Gala and attended as a guest speaker on a regular basis in subsequent years. A march for universal manhood suffrage was held in Newcastle on 12 April 1873,: an estimated 80,000 union members marched through Newcastle to the Town Moor, here speakers included Burt. Burt stood on a Radical reform platform, he believed that the franchise should be extended and this would lead to the election of reform-minded MPs. He called for universal suffrage, which would include women, reapportionment of districts to provide roughly the same number of voters in each constituency, shorter duration of each Parliament and payment of MPs.

In 1874 Burt was elected as Member of Parliament for the Borough of Morpeth in Northumberland. He received 3,332 votes whilst his opponent Capt. F. Duncan received 585. Burt gave his maiden speech on 13 May 1874 in support of G.O. Trevelyan's private member's bill to 'equalize franchise requirements by extending the borough franchise to the counties. In his speech which was to last fifteen minutes he declared 'that the unfairness of the present law was evident to the miners of Northumberland. Of workers at the same colliery, miners residing in the borough could cast a ballot, while those living in the county could not. Also, because miners often moved from one colliery to another, they could easily lose the vote previously enjoyed'. Unfortunately on this occasion the bill was defeated.

After his election as MP, Burt was to split his time between London and his duties as representative for the Borough of Morpeth and Newcastle and his union role. He made sure he was in attendance for every important union meeting. In October 1874 the mine owners called for a twenty per cent reduction of wages, the union put forward a reduction of eight per cent. After arbitration the two sides settled on a wage reduction of fourteen per cent. In 1906, Burt was made a Privy Councillor. He lost the formal support of his own Union, in 1909, because he would not join the Labour Party.

== Legacy ==
On 12 November 1987 on the 150th anniversary of his birth, Dr Eric Wade of the Open University gave the memorial address 'Thomas Burt: His Life and Ideas'. The Stephenson Railway Museum located near Murton Row, where Burt was born, has a steam locomotive which they named 'Thomas Burt' in his honour. The aged miners' homes at Choppington, under construction at the time of Burt's death were named the Burt Memorial Homes. The Northumberland Miners' Association named their Trade Union Offices building Burt Hall. The building - in Northumberland Road, Newcastle upon Tyne and now used by Northumbria University - was opened in 1895 and bears a plaque stating the hall 'was built by the miners' in recognition of valuable service rendered by Thomas Burt M.P. as general secretary for 27 years, and to commemorate his appointment as Parliamentary Secretary to the Board of Trade in 1892.' A block of flats in Bethnal Green, East London, is named after Thomas Burt.

Parliament of the United Kingdom
Preceded by Sir George Grey, Bt	Member of Parliament for Morpeth; 1874–1918	Succeeded by John Cairns
Preceded by Sir John Kennaway, Bt	Father of the House; 1910–1918	Succeeded by T. P. O'Connor
Trade union offices
Preceded by William Crawford	Secretary of the Northumberland Miners' Association; 1865–1905	Succeeded by William Straker
Preceded by Alexander Macdonald	President of the Miners' National Union; 1881–1898	Succeeded by Position abolished
Preceded by William Matkin	President of the Trades Union Congress; 1891	Succeeded by John Hodge
Political offices
Preceded by The Lord Balfour of Burleigh	Parliamentary Secretary to the Board of Trade; 1892–1895	Succeeded by The Earl of Dudley
