= You Saw Them Here First =

- Narrated by: Robert Webb (2013–2014); John Thomson (2015–2016)
- Composer: Keith Mansfield
- Country of origin: United Kingdom
- Original language: English
- No. of episodes: 7

Production
- Running time: 60 minutes (inc. adverts)
- Production company: Shiver Productions

Original release
- Network: ITV
- Release: 31 July 2013 – 4 June 2016

You Saw Them Here First is a British television show that aired on ITV from 31 July 2013. Episodes were narrated by Robert Webb in 2013 and 2014.

In 2015 and 2016, the show was narrated by John Thomson. The theme tune used on the programme was a track called Brass in Action, composed by Keith Mansfield.

== Episodes ==
Episode no.	Airdate	Air time	Narrator
1	31 July 2013	8pm	Robert Webb
2	7 August 2013	8pm	Robert Webb
3	12 March 2014	8pm	Robert Webb
4	19 March 2014	8pm	Robert Webb
5	27 December 2014	6.05pm	Robert Webb
'Hall of Fame' special	2 September 2015	8pm	John Thomson
6	4 June 2016	8pm	John Thomson

== Guests ==
Celebrities who've appeared on You Saw them Here First include: Brian Blessed, Michelle Collins, Mark Benton, Kate Garraway, Sherrie Hewson, Eamonn Holmes, Lesley Joseph, Lorraine Kelly, Patsy Kensit, Barbara Knox, Stephen Mulhern, Sue Nicholls, Nick Pickard, Pauline Quirke, Phillip Schofield, Alison Steadman, Janet Street-Porter, Chris Tarrant, Kimberley Walsh and Arabella Weir.

== Reception ==
Reviews on You Saw Them Here First were mixed. Harry Venning described it as "lazy, tired and formulaic", calling the script "gag-free". Keith Watson called it a "cheap and cheerful summertime filler"
