= The Leeds Studios =

Television production complex

Coordinates: 53.803366°N 1.570106°W

- Yorkshire Television Studios
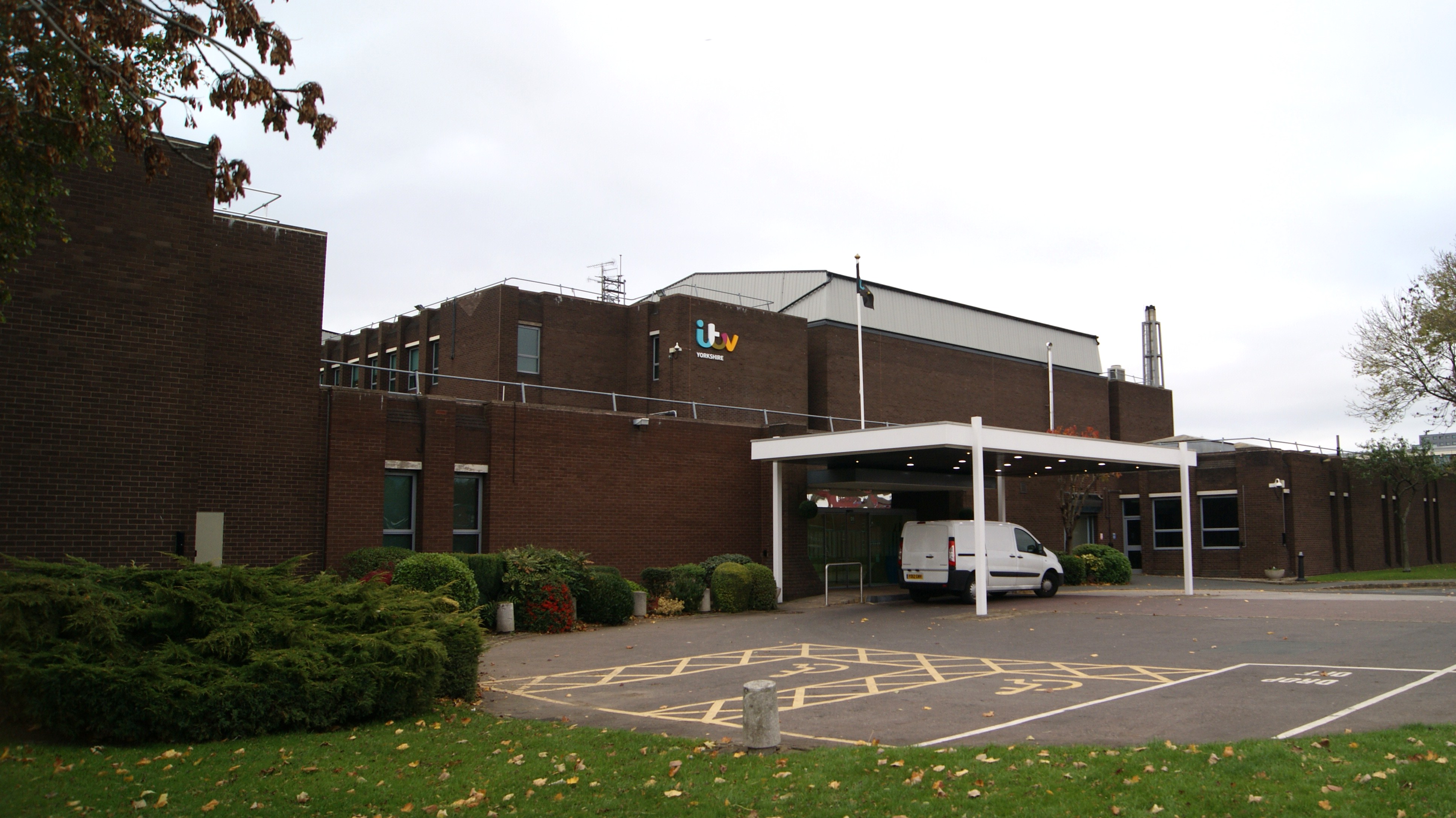
- Front of the main Leeds Studios building
- Alternative names: Yorkshire Television Studios

General information
- Type: Television studios
- Location: Leeds, West Yorkshire, United Kingdom, Kirkstall Road; Leeds
- Current tenants: ITV Yorkshire; ITV Studios
- Construction started: 1967
- Completed: 1968
- Inaugurated: 1968
- Renovated: 2013
- Owner: ITV plc

Technical details
- Floor count: 4 (at height)

The Leeds Studios (also known as the ITV Television Centre, Yorkshire Television Studios or YTV Studios) is a television production complex on Kirkstall Road in Leeds, West Yorkshire, England. ITV plc had proposed to close the studios in 2009, however later in the year had a change of mind and instead decided to refit them as high-definition studios.

== Background ==
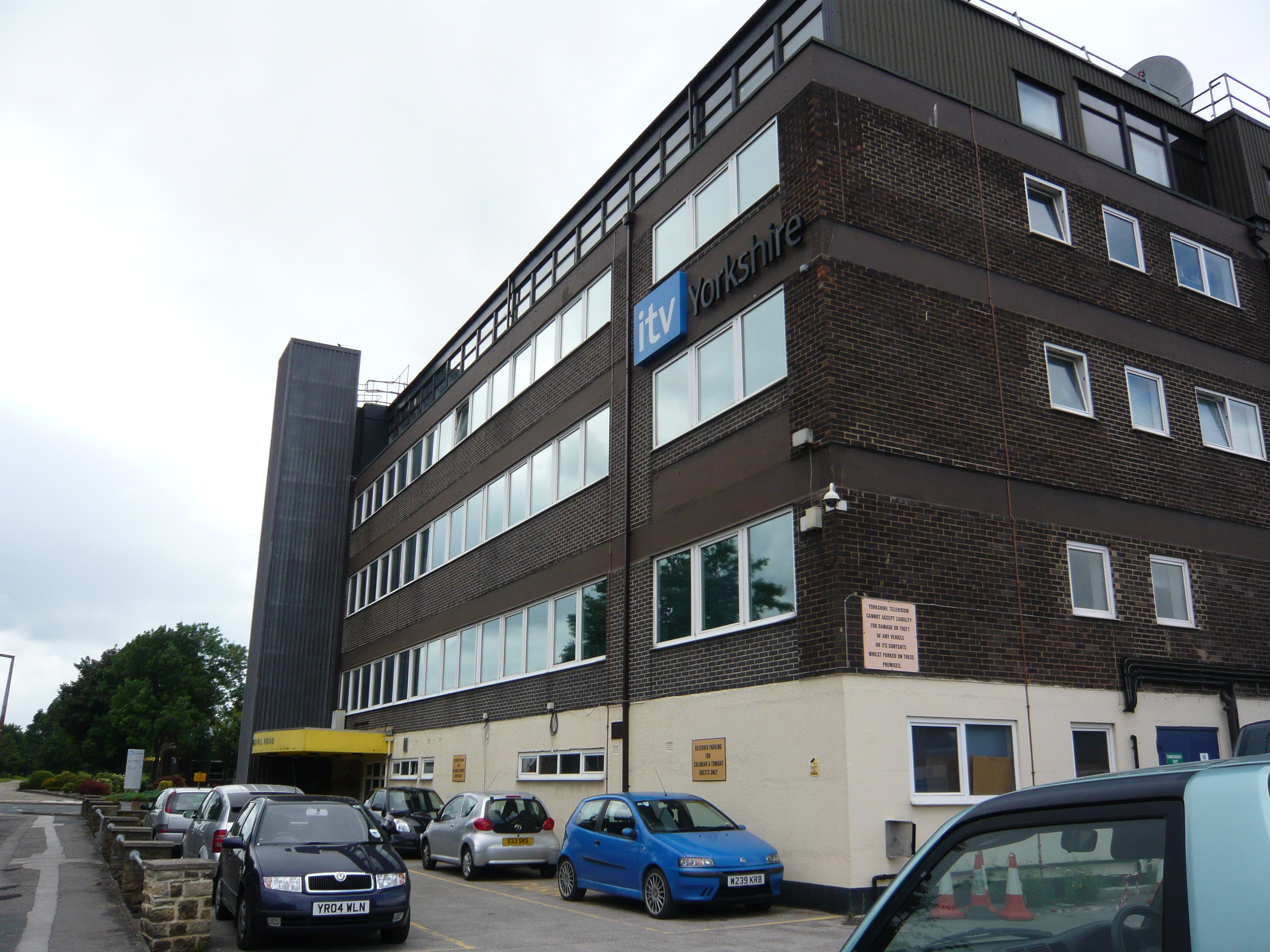
Calendar's former studio building, now the ITV Archive building.

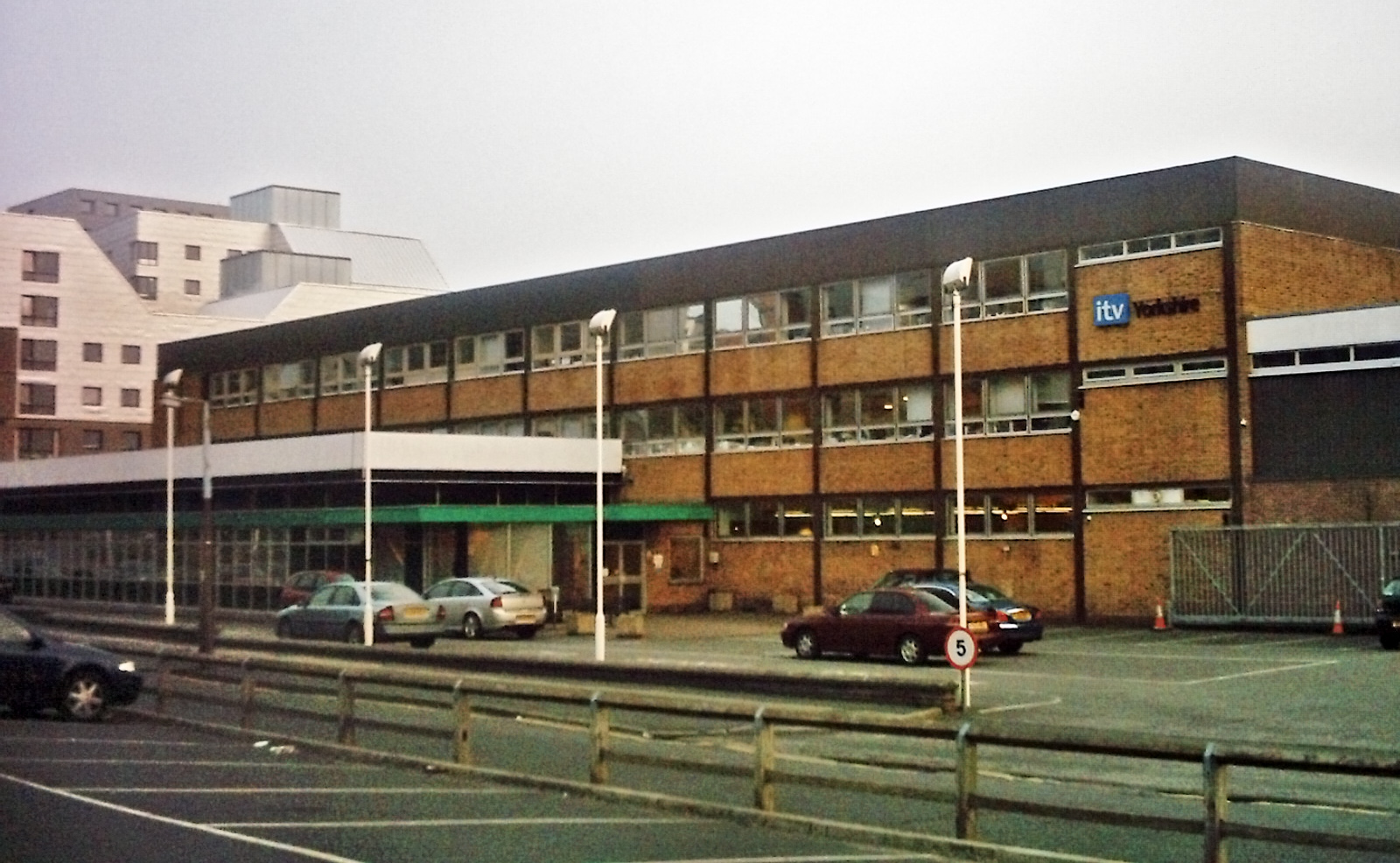
The former Emmerdale production complex, prior to the transfer of production to the main studio building in 2009. Now the Emmerdale Studio Experience visitor attraction.

The Leeds Studios have been the home of Yorkshire Television, and its successor, ITV Yorkshire, since 1968 and are owned by ITV Yorkshire's parent company ITV plc. The complex houses the main studios and administrative headquarters of ITV Yorkshire, which also has smaller offices in Sheffield and Kingston upon Hull.

ITV programmes which have been produced there include: 3-2-1, My Parents Are Aliens, Where the Heart Is, The Royal, Heartbeat, Wire in the Blood, Bruce's Price is Right, Bad Influence! and A Touch of Frost. Countdown was regularly made for Channel 4 here until April 2009 (when it moved to The Manchester Studios and then to MediaCityUK in Salford) as was Win My Wage, a new gameshow for Channel 4 made by independent company Hotbed Media in 2007. The studios were also home to Through the Keyhole, (which began as a YTV production on ITV, but was later made by David Frost's company Paradine Productions for Sky1 and the BBC) and were used for the interior shots on hit comedy The League of Gentlemen and medical drama Bodies (both for the BBC). The revived Bullseye on Challenge was also recorded at the Leeds Studios as was the 2006 series of Mastermind, due to the closure of Granada Studios for the removal of asbestos at the time.

The front of the main studio buildings have, in the past, acted as the main entrance to Hotten General in the serial drama, Emmerdale.

== History ==
The studios were built on slum clearance land on Kirkstall Road, purchased from the former Leeds Corporation.

Construction commenced in early 1967: A mild winter aided building work and by mid-1968 studios one and two were equipped for transmission (studios three and four being completed by early 1969). The studio was officially opened by the Duchess of Kent on 29 July 1968. It was the first purpose-built colour television production centre in Europe and cost over £4 million to build and equip (at 1968 prices). Colour cameras were initially Marconi Mk7s and EMI 2001s. Both of these cameras were in use until the mid-1980s. Some studios in The Leeds Studios used Marconi cameras, the others used EMI cameras. In 1976 the cameras in Studio 3 were replaced with the Philips LDK 25 models.

The regional news show Calendar was produced at the centre for many years but in 1989 was moved to a dedicated newsroom and broadcast facility based in a converted roller rink next to the main studios. The programme moved back to the main studio building in October 2012.

=== Proposed downsizing ===
In March 2009, ITV plc announced that the Leeds Studios were to be downsized to try and save costs following a reported loss of £2.7 billion for 2008. When interviewed on BBC Radio 4 over the proposed closure of much of the studios, the then ITV plc chairman Michael Grade said simply 'We move on'. Screen Yorkshire stated an interest in taking over any parts of the complex that were to be mothballed. Yorkshire Forward looked at the possibility of funding a takeover of the studios but subsequently withdrew their plans.

=== New investment ===
In December 2009 however, ITV plc announced plans to renovate the studios to high-definition standard, moving production of Emmerdale to the main Kirkstall Road building. ITV Yorkshire have expanded into occupying a nearby office block, situated near the Finishing School.

== Studios ==
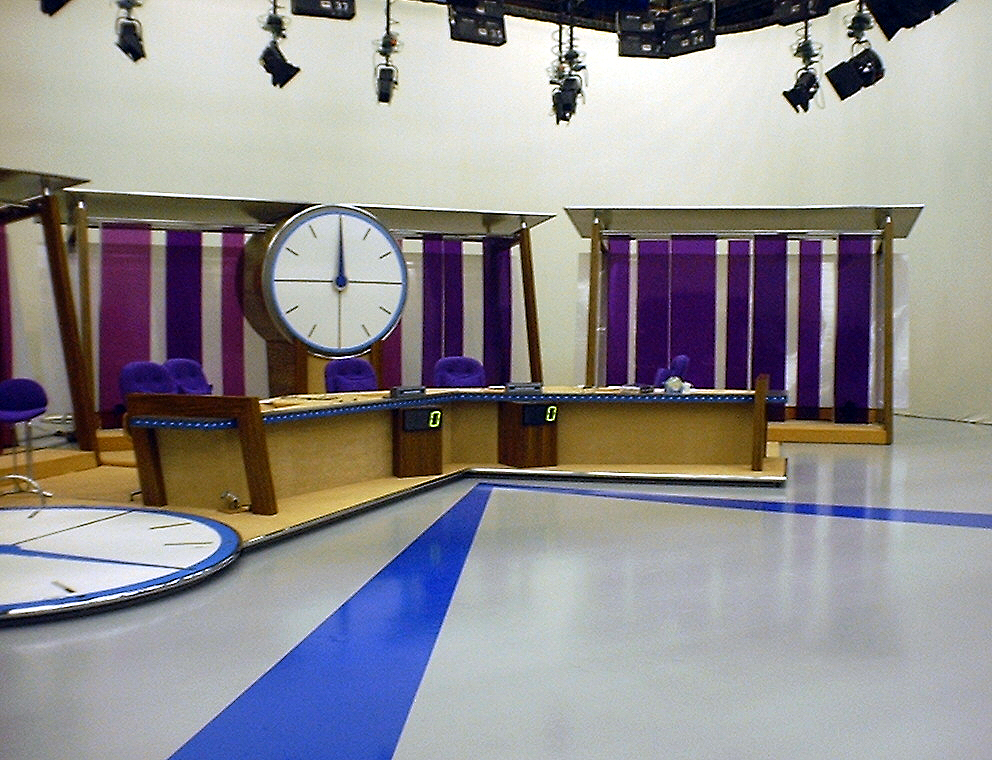
The 2003 Countdown set in studio 3

Studio	Size (sq ft)	Year opened	Original cameras	Notes
1	not stated	1968	Marconi Mk VII colour	Shared facilities with studio 1A. Studio no longer operational.
1A	not stated	1968	Marconi Mk VII colour	Shared facilities with studio 1. Studio no longer operational.
2	1,225	1968	Marconi Mk VII colour	Studio no longer operational.
3	4,430	1968	Marconi Mk VII colour	Former location for the Countdown set. Now used by Emmerdale
4	7,650	1969	EMI 2001	Often used for drama series, has also been used for Mastermind and snooker. Now used by Emmerdale.
Calendar	not stated	1989	unknown	The Calendar studios are in the adjacent Calendar building (officially 104 Kirkstall Road).

There are other studios in adjacent buildings, some owned by ITV plc and others being independent, however none of these studios were purpose built. A notable one which is not run by ITV plc is Studio 81, which is particularly large at 16,000 sq ft (230 ft × 70 ft) and used for the filming of single-camera dramas.

== Drama ==
Over the years the studios, particularly Studio 4, have been used for filming television drama, mostly for Yorkshire Television. These series have included Heartbeat, The Royal, Wire in the Blood, Married Single Other, Fat Friends, A Touch of Frost, Bodies and Where the Heart is. Fat Friends set an episode at the Leeds Studios and used non-studio areas of the complex for filming.

The adjacent Studio 81, has been used recently in the filming of Wuthering Heights and the Red Riding Trilogy.

== Other uses ==
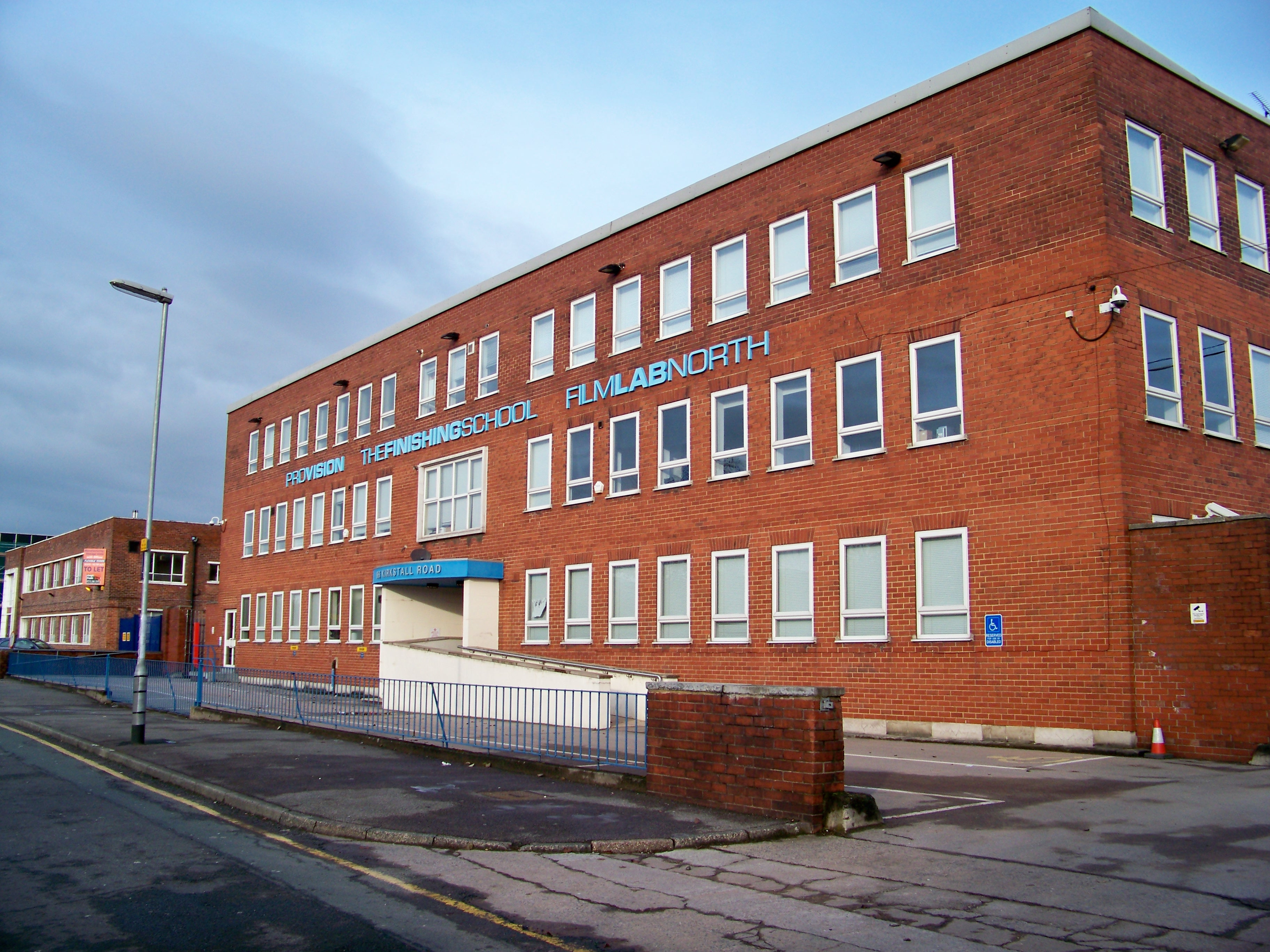
The Finishing School buildings are situated adjacent to the main studios and are used by ProVision and Film Lab North.

The site is now home to advert and regional programme playout for ITV plc's northern transmission areas (ITV Granada, ITV Yorkshire, ITV Tyne Tees and ITV Border), and a number of independent producers. The production facilities are marketed as The Leeds Studios and sister companies ProVision, Film Lab North and The Finishing School occupy adjacent buildings. While Prism also have set up studios in an older building adjacent to the complex. Greatest Hits West Yorkshire occupy radio studios set up adjacent to the Leeds Studios in the early 1980s, making the lower end of Kirkstall Road arguably a small media quarter.

The ITV Archive (including the Rank, Korda and ITC Film libraries) is also based at the Leeds campus.
