= Hugh Boyle (trade unionist) =

Hugh Boyle (27 November 1850 – 26 March 1907) was a British trade unionist.

Born in Wooler in Northumberland to a Catholic family, Boyle grew up in Bedlington and was educated at a school in Cowpen. He began working underground at a coal mine in 1860, his father having died, and later moved with his mother and siblings to Seghill, where he continued to work at a colliery. He joined the Northumberland Miners' Association in 1878, at which time it was a district of the Miners' National Association, later becoming a branch delegate, lodge president and member of the local conciliation board. He represented the Northumberland Miners at the international congresses of 1893 and 1896, where he spoke in opposition to nationalisation of the coal mines, and in 1896, he was elected as president of the Northumberland Miners.

In his spare time, Boyle joined the Economics Society of Newcastle, where he promoted Georgism. He supported the Liberal Party, identifying as a radical, and campaigned for proportional representation and Irish home rule.

Boyle was appointed as a magistrate at the start of 1907, but died later in the year.

Trade union offices
Preceded by John Nixon	President of the Northumberland Miners' Association; 1896 – 1907	Succeeded by Joseph English
