= Gracefield Arts Centre =

Art museum in Dumfries, Scotland

Coordinates: 55°4′26.3″N 3°36′27.8″W

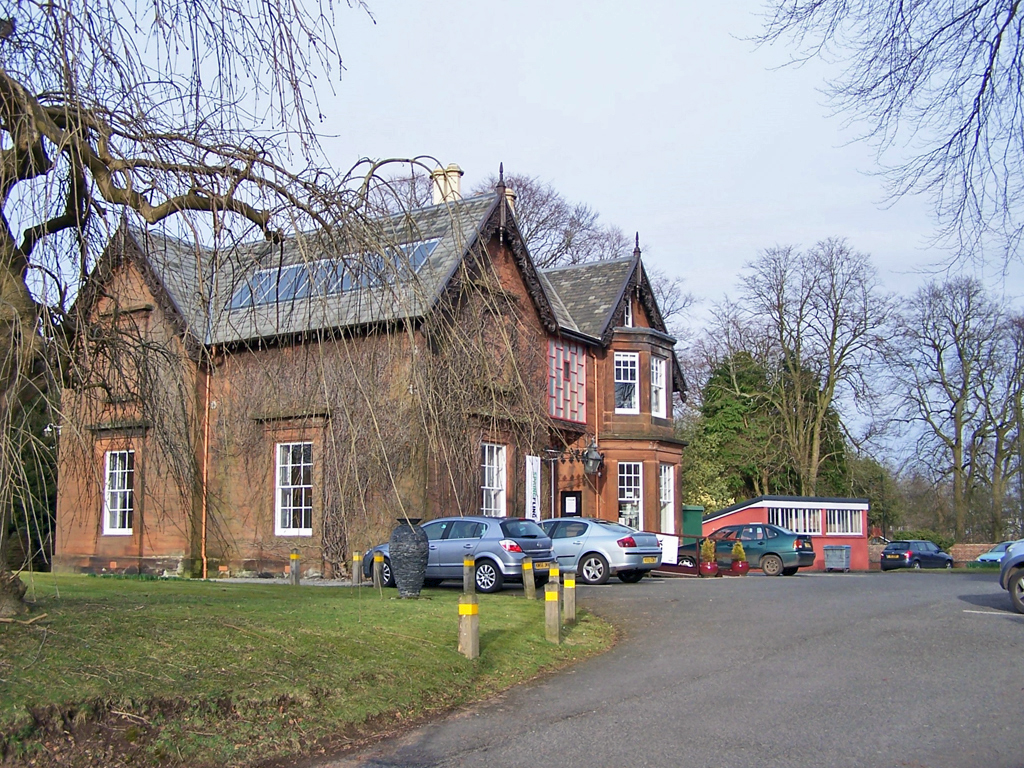

- Location within Scotland
- Location: 28 Edinburgh Rd, Dumfries DG1 1JQ, United Kingdom
- Website: https://www.visitscotland.com/info/see-do/gracefield-arts-centre-p249481

Gracefield Arts Centre is located in Dumfries. The gallery's main building, a Category B listed building, was bought in 1951 by a committee of local people who raised the money needed for the purchase and to do the alterations necessary to change the former house, which was known as ‘Gracefield’ into an art gallery.

The gallery houses a collection of over 600 Scottish paintings which include paintings by the Scottish Colourists, the Glasgow Boys, the Kirkcudbright School and the Edinburgh School, as well as contemporary Scottish works of art by the likes of Joan Eardley and Andy Goldsworthy. The gallery hosts a changing programme of contemporary exhibitions featuring regional, national and international artists and craftmakers.

A wide range of art and craft activities for adults and children run throughout the year at the gallery.
