= Northumberland Miners' Association =

- Dissolved: National Union of Mineworkers
- Founded: 1864
- Dissolved: 2018
- Location: United Kingdom
- Members: 32,327 (1907)
- Parent organization: MNU (1864–1898); MFGB (1907–1944); NUM (1945–2018)
- Affiliations: Miners' Federation of Great Britain

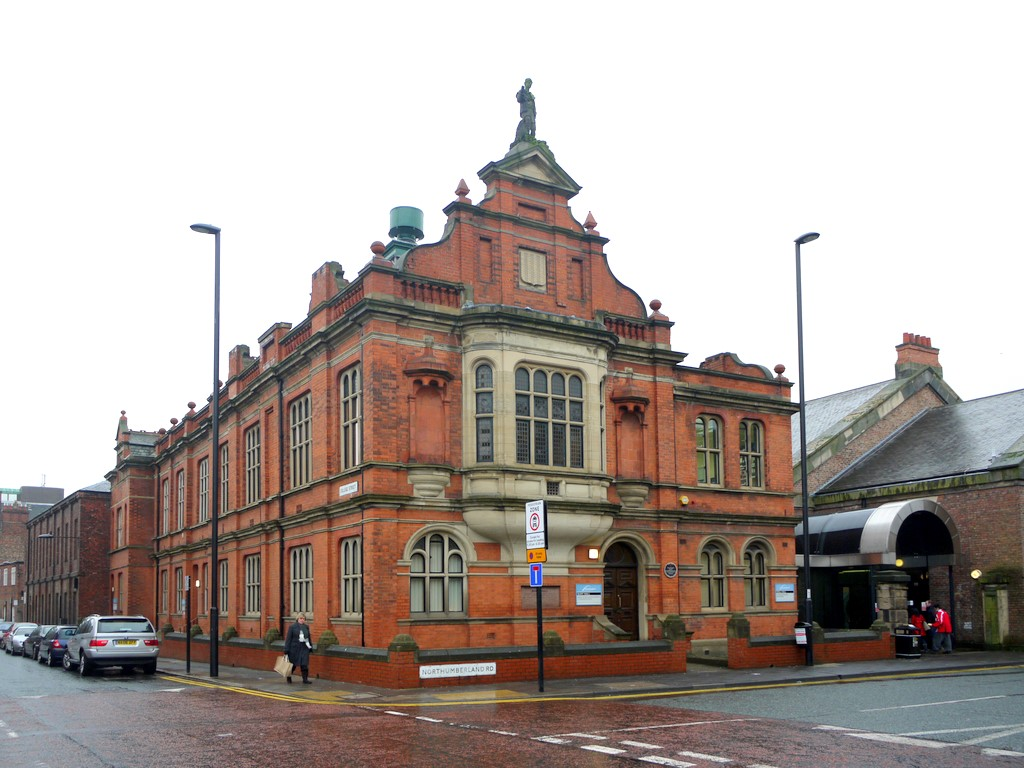
Burt Hall in Newcastle, former headquarters of the Northumberland Miners' Association.

The Northumberland Miners' Association was a trade union in the United Kingdom.

The union was founded in 1864 to represent coal miners in Northumberland, following the collapse of a short-lived union covering both Northumberland and Durham miners. Originally named the Northumberland Miners' Mutual Confident Association, it aimed for respectability, requiring high subscriptions and avoiding strikes. It did not affiliate to the national body, the Miners' Federation of Great Britain, until 1907. In 1945, this became the National Union of Mineworkers, and the association became its Northumberland Area. This was dissolved in 2018.

== General Secretaries ==
1864: William Crawford
1865: Thomas Burt
1913: William Straker
1935: Jim Bowman
1950: Robert Main
1975: Sammy Scott
1985:
1992: Ian Lavery
2010: Denis Murphy

== Presidents ==
John Nixon
1872: William Grieves
John Bryson
John Nixon
1896: Hugh Boyle
1907: Joseph English
1914: William Weir
1927: William Golightly
1940: Hugh McKay
1960s: Tom Holliday
1977:
1980s: Denis Murphy

== Financial Secretaries ==
1906: John Cairns
1918: Ebby Edwards
1929: John Carr
1939: Jack Besford
