= Burt Hall =

Building in Newcastle upon Tyne, England

Coordinates: 54.97690°N 1.60994°W

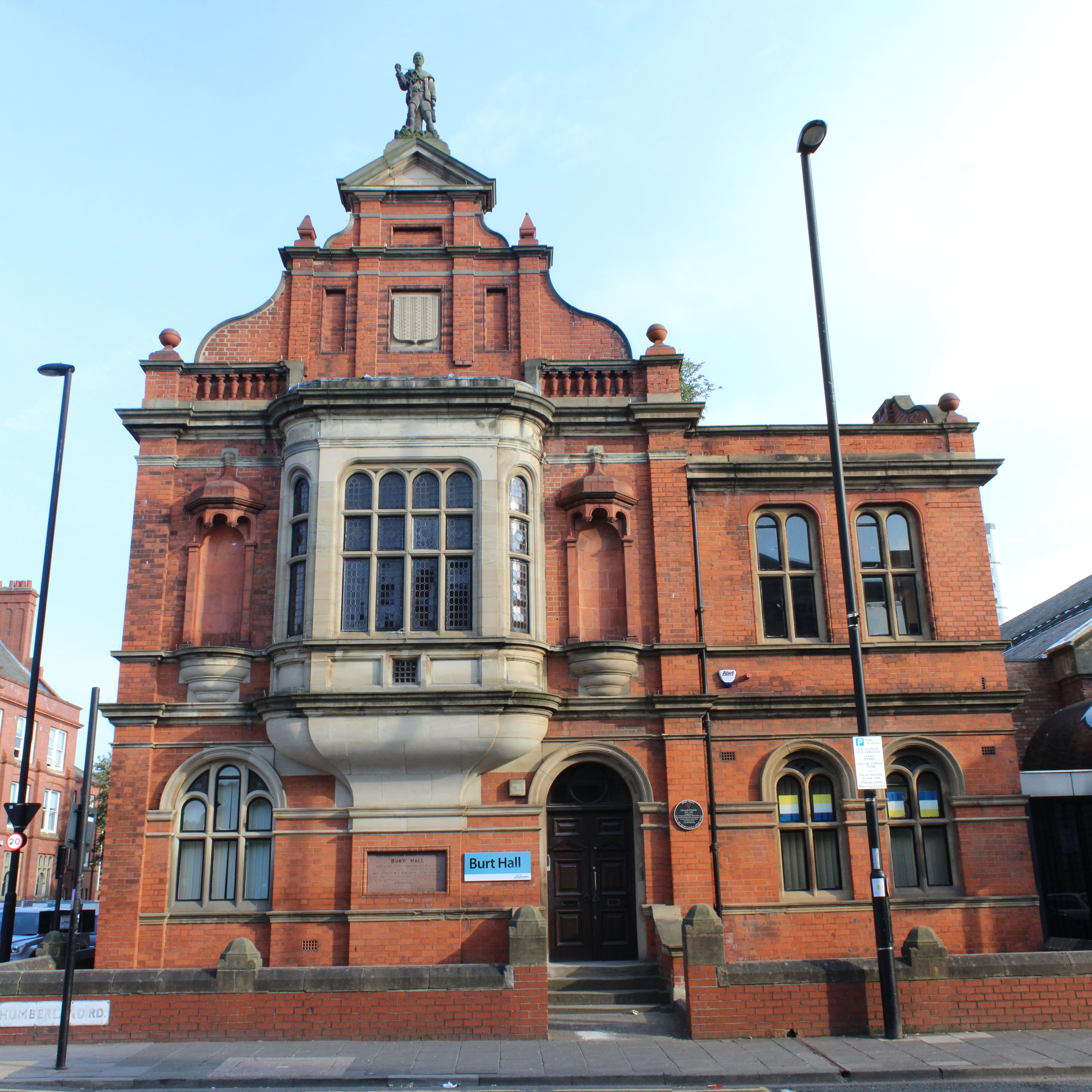
Burt Hall

Burt Hall is a public building in Northumberland Road in Newcastle upon Tyne. It is a Grade II listed building.

== History ==
The building was designed by John Dyson for the Northumberland Miners' Association and completed in 1895. A plaque on the wall states that it "was built by the miners' in recognition of valuable service rendered by Thomas Burt M.P. as general secretary for 27 years, and to commemorate his appointment as Parliamentary Secretary to the Board of Trade in 1892."

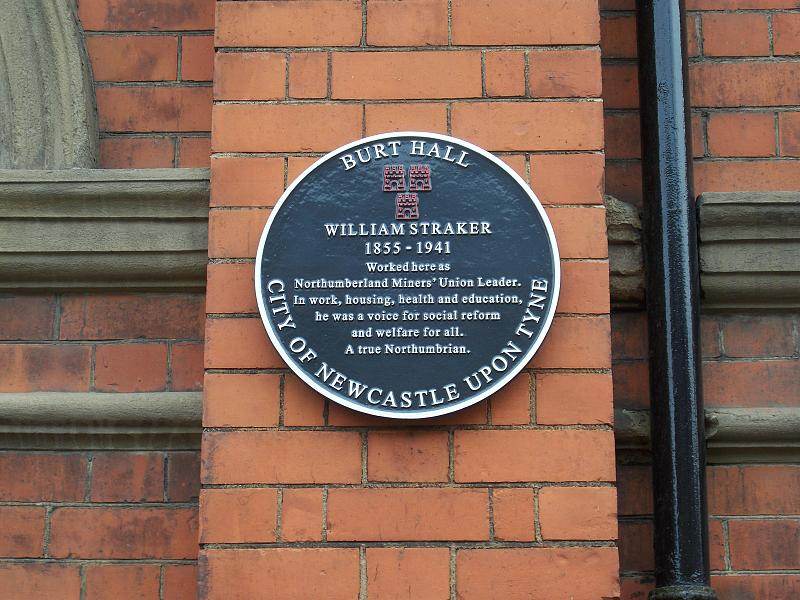
William Straker plaque on Burt Hall

There is a statue of a miner with his pick and lamp on the roof; the statue is modeled on a painting entitled "Going Home". The building served as the head office of the Northumberland Branch of the National Union of Mineworkers until it was acquired by Northumbria University in the 1990s. It is now occupied by the university's Department of Arts, Faculty of Arts, Design and Social Sciences.
