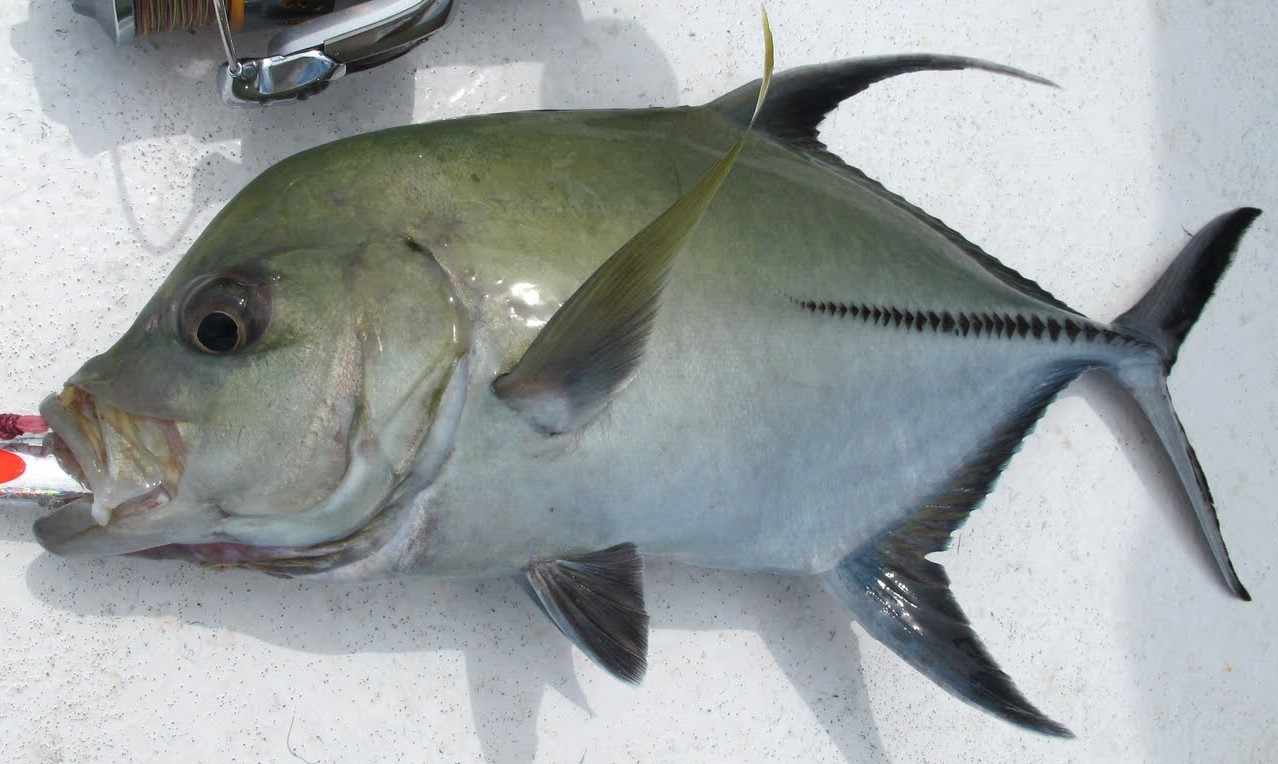

Conservation status
- Least Concern (IUCN 3.1)

Scientific classification
- Kingdom: Animalia
- Phylum: Chordata
- Class: Actinopterygii
- Order: Carangiformes
- Suborder: Carangoidei
- Family: Carangidae
- Genus: Caranx
- Species: C. lugubris

Binomial name
- Caranx lugubris Poey, 1860
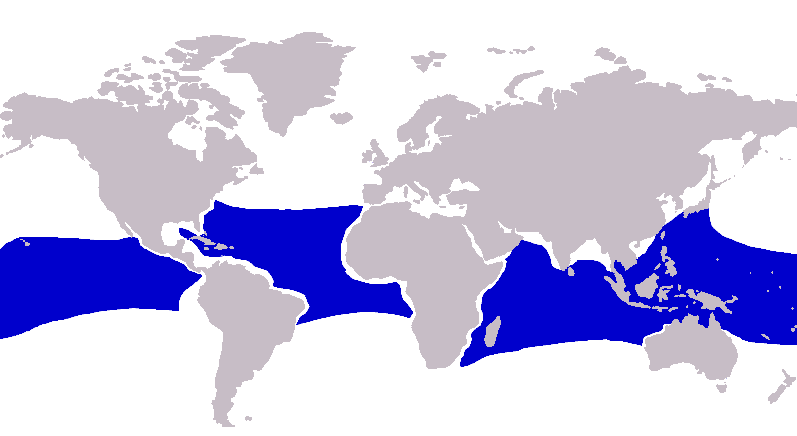
- Approximate range of the black jack

Synonyms
- Caranx ascensionis (Cuvier, 1833); Caranx frontalis (Poey, 1860); Caranx ishikawai (Wakiya, 1924); Caranx tenebrosus (Jordan, Evermann & Wakiya, 1927)

= Caranx lugubris =

Species of fish

Caranx lugubris, the black jack, black trevally, black kingfish, coal fish or black ulua, is a species of large ocean fish in the jack family Carangidae. The species has a circumtropical distribution, found in oceanic, offshore waters of the tropical zones of the Pacific, Atlantic and Indian Oceans. The species is particularly prevalent around offshore islands such as the Caribbean islands in the Atlantic, Hawaii and French Polynesia in the Pacific and the Seychelles and Maldives in the Indian Ocean. Black jack are rare in shallow waters, preferring deep reefs, ledges and seamounts in clear waters. The species is easily distinguished by its black to grey fins and jet black scutes, with the head having a steep profile near the snout. The largest recorded length is 1 m and weight of 17.9 kg. The black jack lives either individually or in small schools, and is known to school with other species. It is a predatory fish, taking a variety of fish, crustaceans and molluscs as prey. Sexual maturity is reached at 34.6 cm in females and 38.2 cm in males, with spawning taking place between February and September in the Caribbean. The early life history of the species is very poorly understood. Black jack are of high importance to many island fisheries, but are rarely encountered in most continental fisheries. The species has a reputation as a gamefish, and is variably considered a terrible or excellent food fish, although several cases of ciguatera poisoning have been attributed to the species. The species was initially named Caranx ascensionis by Georges Cuvier, however several issues with the use of this name have seen Felipe Poey's name Caranx lugubris become the valid scientific name.

== Taxonomy and naming ==
The black jack is classified within the genus Caranx, one of a number of groups known as the jacks or trevallies. Caranx itself is part of the larger jack and horse mackerel family Carangidae, which in turn is part of the order Carangiformes.

The taxonomic history of the black jack is quite complex, with the species first referred to in error as Scomber adscensionis (Osbeck, 1771), which was also used to describe what is now known as Pseudocaranx dentex. Georges Cuvier resurrected this name when he described the species as Caranx ascensionis in 1833. This was the first naming pertaining to the fish, and would normally have priority over any names assigned later. However, the species as it is currently known, was first scientifically described in 1860 by the Cuban zoologist Felipe Poey in his two volume work Historia Natural de la Isla de Cuba, or "Natural History of the Island of Cuba". He assigned the species to the jack genera Caranx, and gave the Latin specific epithet of lugubris, meaning "mournful", or "pertaining to mourning". Although the description was based on a fish from Cuba, no holotype is known for the species. Poey initially described his species as different from Cuvier's C. ascensionis, however he later placed both C. lugubris and another species he had named, C. frontalis, in synonymy with C. ascensionis. In later work, Poey again listed these three names as synonyms, but treated C. lugubris as valid, noting that Cuvier's name had also been used for Pseudocaranx dentex. Most later taxonomic revisions supported Poey's judgement, with the name C. ascensionis often considered a junior secondary homonym. William Smith-Vaniz and John Randall put forth a proposal to the ICZN in 1994 to formally instate C. lugubris as the species name, which was accepted in 1996.

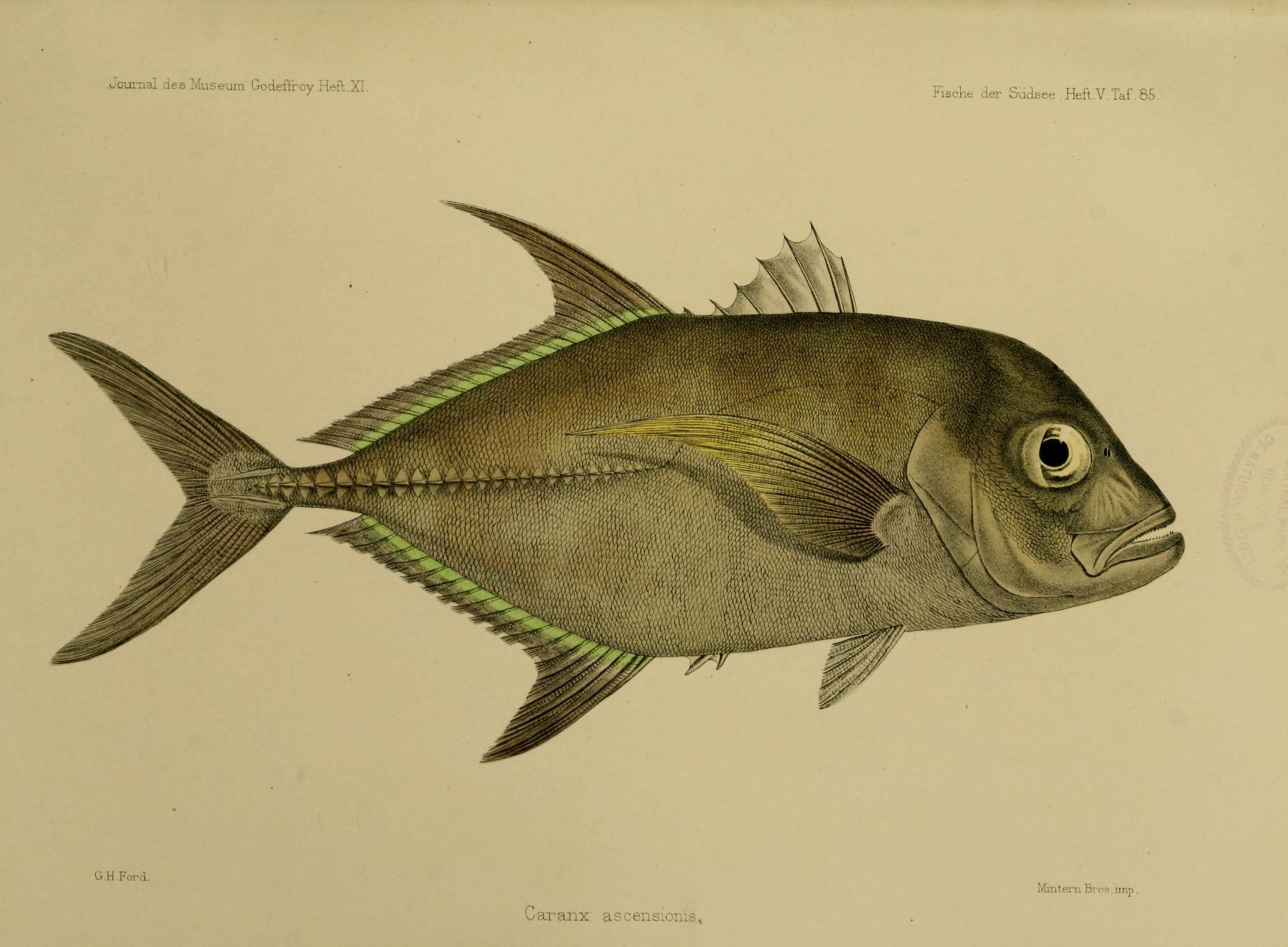
An early, misnamed, anatomical drawing of C. lugubris.

The species common names all refer to the black hue displayed by the fish, with the name 'black jack' most commonly used. Other names include 'black trevally', 'black kingfish', 'coal fish' and 'black ulua' in Hawaii.

== Distribution and habitat ==
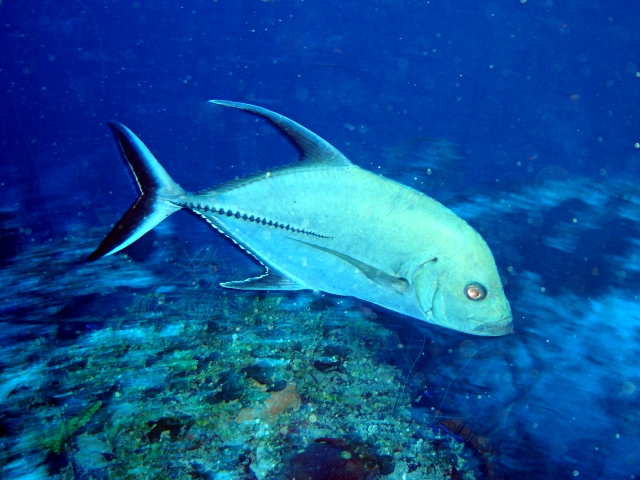
A black jack swimming over a reef

The black jack has a circumtropical distribution, meaning their range extends around the Earth's equatorial oceans, thereby inhabiting the tropical and subtropical regions of the Atlantic, Pacific and Indian Oceans. In the Indian Ocean, they are found from Natal, South Africa in the west to northern Australia in the east. They are patchily distributed along the east African and Asian coastline in the Indian Ocean, being absent from both the Persian Gulf and Red Sea, as well as several countries bordering the ocean. The species is widely known from many Indian Ocean islands including the Seychelles, Réunion, Mauritius and Cargados Carajos In the Pacific Ocean, the black jack is known from parts of the Indonesian-Australian archipelago north to Japan, and through many of the Pacific Islands such as Hawaii, New Caledonia and Tonga. The species range in the eastern Pacific has been ranges from Mexico and the Revillagigedo Islands in the north to Costa Rica in the south. In the western Atlantic Ocean, black jack have been found from North Carolina in the U.S. south to Rio de Janeiro, with the species most common in the Caribbean and the northern Gulf of Mexico. In the eastern Atlantic, the species has been reported from the Azores, Madeira St. Paul's Rocks, Ascension Island, and the Gulf of Guinea.

The black jack is a benthopelagic species rarely found in shallow inshore waters, preferring deep, clear offshore waters of depths from 12 to 354 m. The species is most common in insular oceanic habitats and around offshore islands, rarely found close to the continents. The black jack inhabits deep reefs and reef drop offs, also being common around oceanic seamounts. It has been recorded from lagoons in the Solomon Islands.

== Description ==
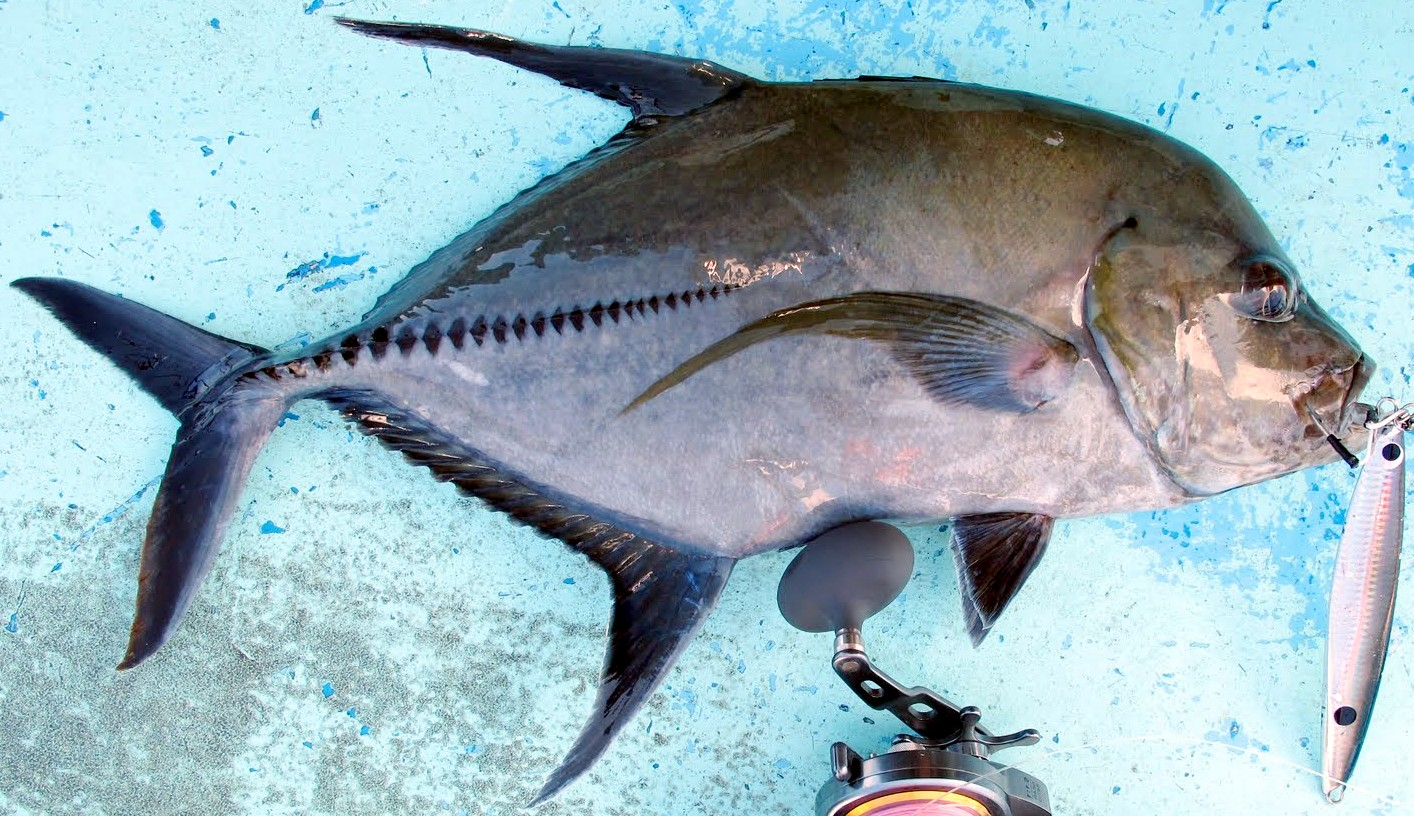
The black jack has characteristic black fins and scutes

The black jack is a large fish, and is confidently known to grow to a length of 1 m and a weight of 17.9 kg, although is more common at lengths under 70 cm. At least one source asserts a fish of 2.21 m has been reported, which if true would make the black jack the second largest species of carangid behind the yellowtail amberjack (2.5 m). The black jack has a similar overall body shape to the other members of Caranx, having an oblong, compressed form, with the dorsal profile more convex than the ventral profile. This convexity is most pronounced at the head, which slopes steeply downwards, giving the head profile a very angular appearance. The profile between the snout and the nape is concave, with this indent centered near the nostrils. The mouth is fairly large compared to other members of its genus and the maxilla extends to under the centre of the fish's eye. The upper jaw contains a series of strong outer canines with an inner band of smaller teeth, while the lower jaw contains a single row of widely spaced conical teeth. The dorsal fin of the black jack is in two sections; the first has 8 spines and the second 1 spine and 20 to 22 soft rays. The anal fin has 2 anteriorly detached spines and 16 to 19 soft rays. The lobes of both the dorsal and anal fins are elongated. The pelvic fins contain 1 spine and 21 soft rays, while the pectoral fins are falcate and longer than the head. The lateral line has a pronounced and moderately long anterior arch, with the curved section intersecting the straight section below the lobe of the second dorsal fin. The curved section of the lateral line contains around 50 scales while the straight section 26 to 32 strong scutes. The caudal peduncle also has paired bilateral keels. The chest is completely covered in scales, which like the rest of the body are small and cycloid in nature. The species has 23 to 30 gill rakers in total and there are 24 vertebrae present.

The body of the black jack is a uniform olive to brown, grey and even black colour along the back that lightens to a grey-blue near the underside of the fish. The black jack's fins are grey to black, and the scutes are black. The upper limit of the operculum often has a small dark spot present, usually smaller than the pupil.

== Biology and ecology ==
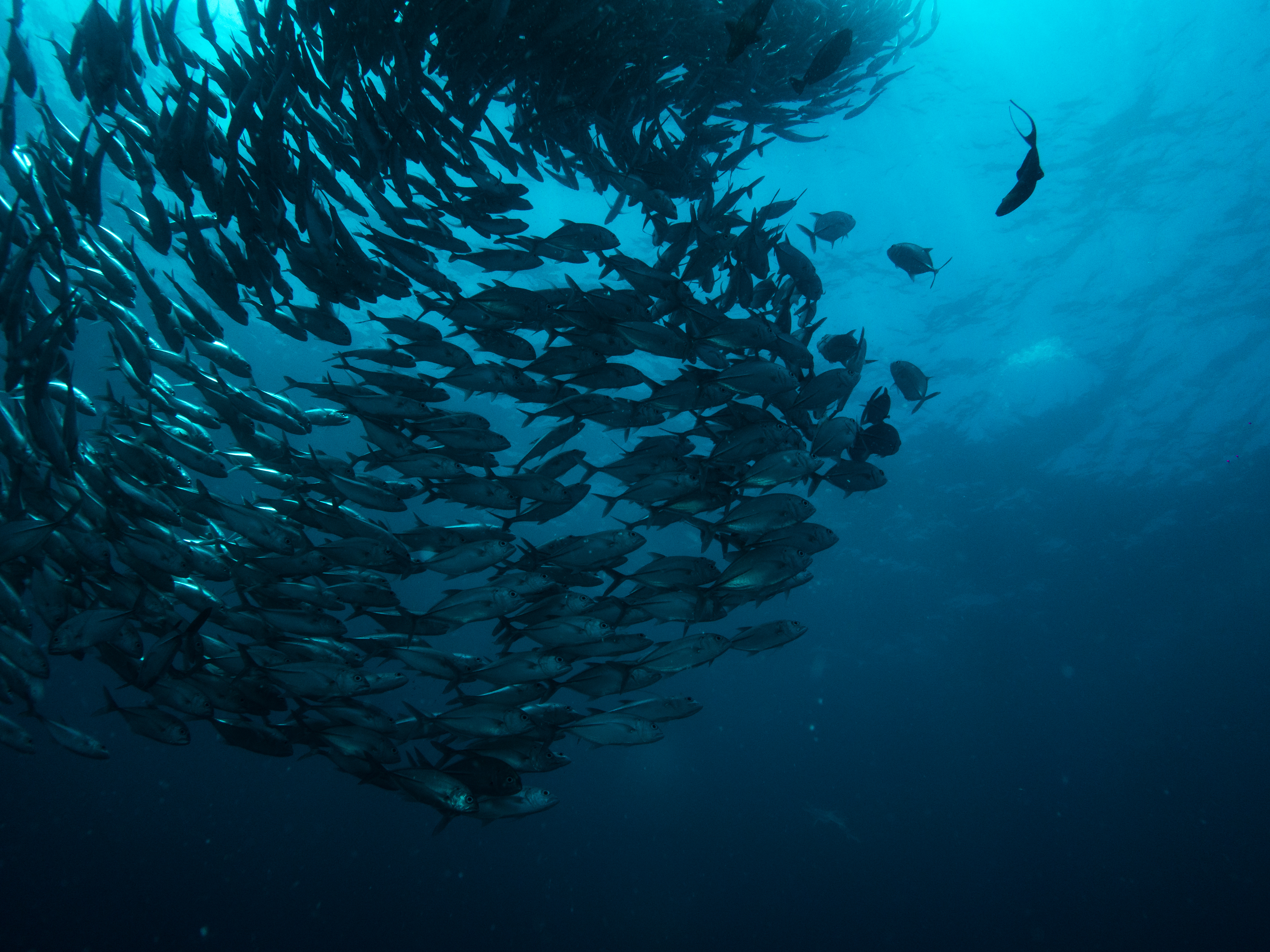
Schooling black jack

The black jack lives both in solitude and in schools of up to 30 individuals. Like several other jacks, black jack are able to coordinate these aggregations over coral reefs based on the release of dimethylsulfoniopropionate (DMSP) from the reef. DMSP is a naturally occurring chemical produced by marine algae and to a lesser extent corals and their symbiotic zooxanthellae. In the Atlantic the species has also been video-recorded schooling with the almaco jack, Seriola rivoliana, and the greater amberjack, Seriola dumerili. The diet of the species has been reported on two occasions; once from Easter Island in the south Pacific, where the diet consisted mainly of fish and crustaceans including stomatopods and isopods; and from Brazil, where a variety of fish, crustaceans and molluscs were taken. There is also some suggestion that in Brazil the species may be competing for food with the red snapper, Lutjanus campechanus, with both having almost identical diets. The black jack is also known to follow spinner dolphins to feed off their excrements. The life history of the species has been determined in part from the waters of Jamaica. Here the Male:Female sex ratios have been reported as 1:0.55, indicating males are nearly twice as common than females. The black jack reaches sexual maturity at 34.6 cm in females and 38.2 cm in males. The timing of spawning is poorly known, with occurrences recorded in February, April, May and July to September. The reproductive behaviour and early life history of the species is entirely unknown. Analysis of black jack catches suggest the average length of the fish is 50 cm for males and 48 cm for females.

== Relationship to humans ==
The black jack is of moderate to high importance to commercial fisheries throughout its range, often being the most abundant large carangid in offshore island catches. The species is taken by both various nets and traps as well as by hook and line. Black jack are usually marketed as fresh, whole fish, but they are also sold salted or dried. The species rarity in most areas means it is not a major target for anglers, however some offshore locations such as the Bahamas the black jack is an important gamefish. The species appeal as a food fish varies between location, with some regions considering it the best table fish available. Despite this, numerous ciguatera poisoning cases have been attributed to the black jack, with laboratory tests confirming the presence of the toxin in the species flesh. The IGFA all tackle world record for the species stands at 18.80 kg (41 lb 7 oz) caught off the Hurricane Bank, Mexico in 2013.
