= Kirkcudbright Artists' Colony =

Artists' community in Scotland

The Kirkcudbright Artists’ Colony was an artists’ community that existed approximately between 1880 and 1980 in Kirkcudbright in Dumfries and Galloway. The town attracted many of the country’s leading artists such as Edward Atkinson Hornel, William Mouncey, William Stewart MacGeorge, Charles Oppenheimer, Jessie M. King, E. A. Taylor and Samuel Peploe. These artists and craftspeople produced an extensive body of work. Some of them are fictionalised in the 1907 S. R. Crockett novel Little Esson, including the title character who is a fictionalised version of MacGeorge (Crockett's boyhood friend).

This places Kirkcudbright in the context of a group of artists’ communities that emerged in Britain from the late 19th century onwards such as Newlyn, Staithes, St Ives, Walberswick, as well in Europe generally, for example at Pont-Aven in Brittany and Worpswede in Germany. However, no other community attracted so many artists for such a long period, so that Kirkcudbright retained its special place in the history of Scottish art for over 100 years. This reputation is upheld today with artists working in the town at the Wasps Studios at Cannonwalls in the High Street.

== Evolution of Kirkcudbright Artists' Colony ==
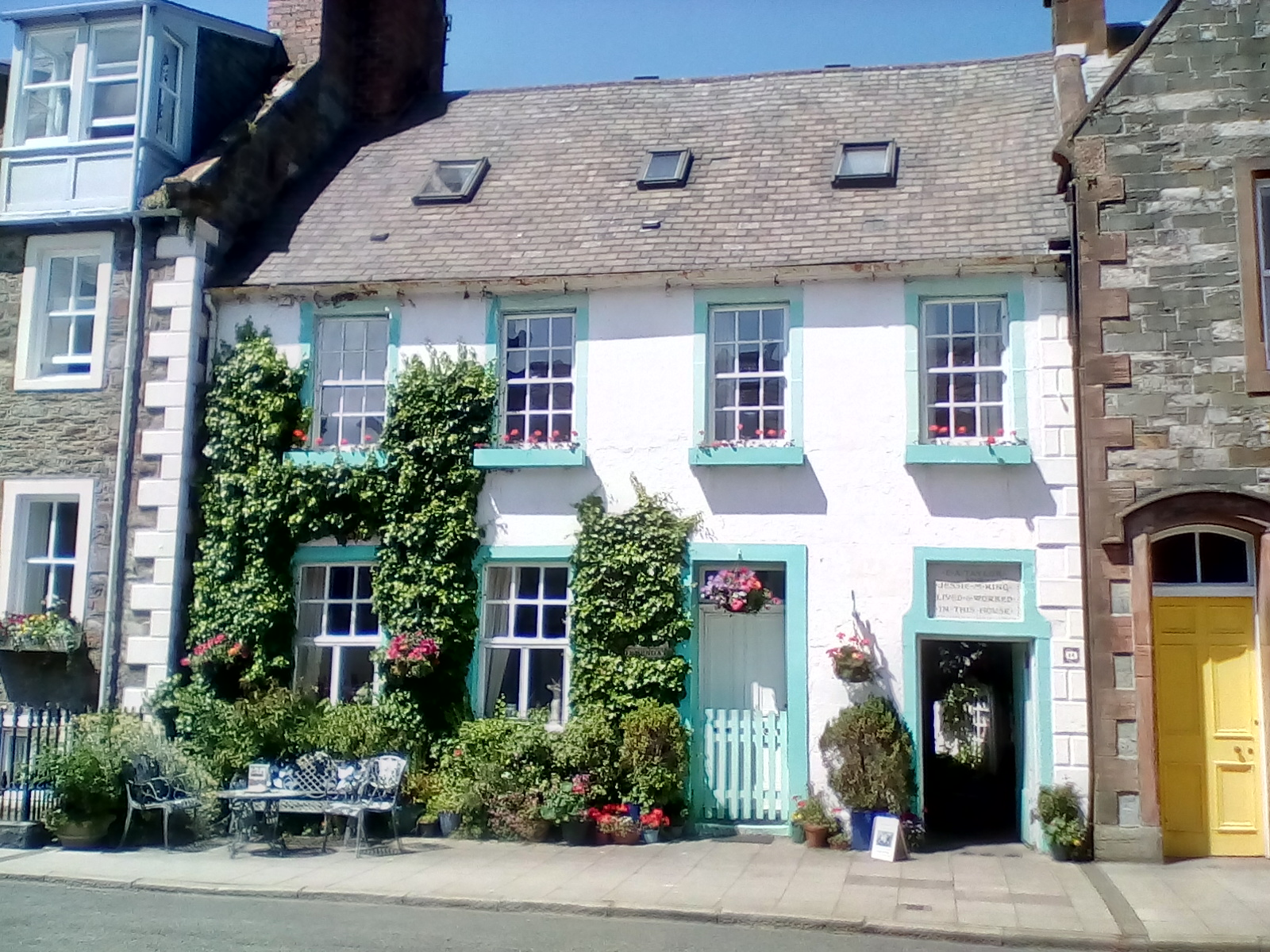
The Greengate, studio and home of Jessie M. King and E. A. Taylor

Arguably the Kirkcudbright Artists’ Colony would not have evolved without with E. A. Hornel (1864–1933), who became Kirkcudbright’s best-known artist. Hornel first came to prominence as one of the Glasgow Boys. He worked in Glasgow, sharing a studio with George Henry (1858–1943), but maintained his connections with his home town. As a result, the town became known to several of the ‘Boys’, particularly George Henry and James Guthrie (1859–1930), as a favoured summer painting location, taking over from previous summer resorts, for example Brig o' Turk in the Trossachs and Cockburnspath in Berwickshire. The presence of the artist John Faed (1818–1902) at Gatehouse of Fleet, eight miles from Kirkcudbright, and his support for the younger generation of Kirkcudbrightshire artists, was a further factor leading to the evolution of an artistic community in Kirkcudbright. The combination of professional experience and career success, coupled with youthful energy, ambition and enthusiasm, led to the establishment of the Kirkcudbrightshire Fine Arts Association in 1886, with Faed as its President, and younger artists such as Hornel, Thomas Bromley Blacklock (1863–1903) and William Stewart MacGeorge (1861–1931) on the Committee, together with several older, local amateur painters.

By 1900, Kirkcudbright’s artistic reputation was such that Glasgow- and Edinburgh-based artists such as Edward Arthur Walton (1860–1922), Archibald Standish Hartrick (1864–1950), Robert Macaulay Stevenson (1854–1952), James Lawton Wingate (1846–1924), David Gauld (1865–1936) and David Young Cameron (1865–1945) were drawn to explore and paint in Galloway. In south-west Scotland as a whole, Galloway and Arran were equally regarded by landscape painters at this time, and Wingate was one of several artists who painted in both areas. In contrast to the Galloway visitors, the locally born artists, Blacklock and MacGeorge, found it necessary to pursue their subsequent careers from bases nearer Edinburgh, although they made regular return visits to Kirkcudbright.

== The Kirkcudbright School ==
A style later described as that of the ‘Kirkcudbright School’ began to emerge in the late 1880s, where subjects typically involve children amongst woodland or flowers, becoming ever more decorative, and with much use of the impasto technique, with paint laid on heavily with a palette knife. Exhibitions containing pieces from the ‘Kirkcudbright School’ were displayed as part of annual exhibitions arranged by the Kirkcudbrightshire Fine Art Association between 1886–1889 in Kirkcudbright. Hornel’s brother-in-law, William Mouncey (1852–1901), and the Canadian artist H. Ivan Neilson (1865–1931), who worked in Kirkcudbright in the period 1900–1904, can also be counted as part of the ‘Kirkcudbright School’, along with Hornel, MacGeorge, Blacklock, Malcolm M. Harper (1839–1917) and John Copland (1854–1929).

== E. A. Taylor and Jessie M. King ==
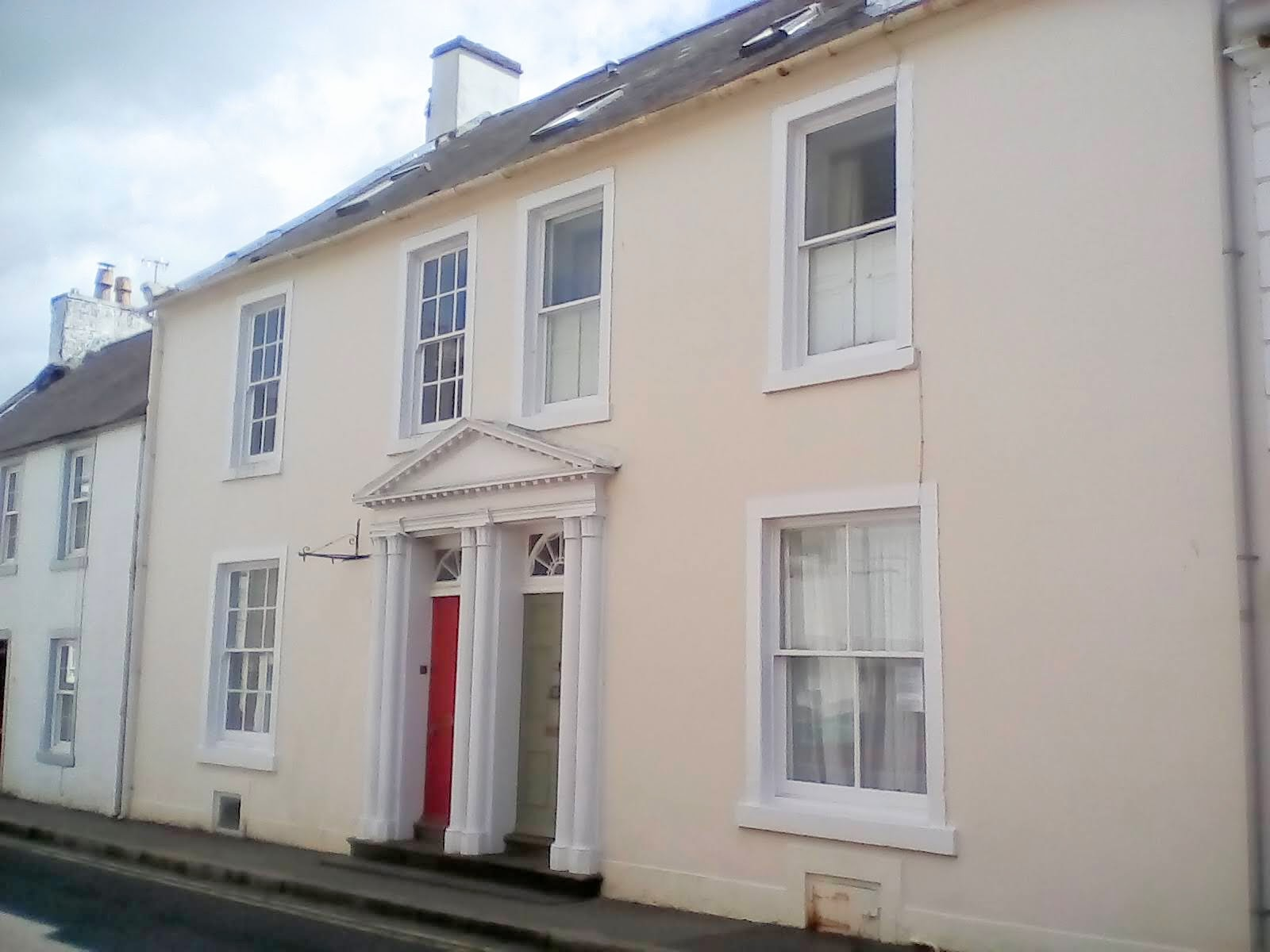
3 & 5 High Street, Kirkcudbright. Home and studio of artist David Sassoon

From 1915, the ‘Glasgow-Style’ book illustrator Jessie M. King (1875–1949) and her husband, the artist and designer E. A. Taylor (1874–1951), were permanently resident in Kirkcudbright, from where they arranged annual summer painting courses on Arran. King had purchased her property ‘Greengate’ and its close in 1909, probably with the encouragement of E. A. Hornel. By this time Kirkcudbright’s reputation as an artistic centre had been reinforced by the arrival of artists such as William Robson (1863–1950) from Capri via Edinburgh in 1904; Charles Oppenheimer (1875–1961) from Manchester in 1908; William Hanna Clarke (1882–1924) in 1914 from Glasgow; to be followed by David Sassoon (1888–1978) in the early 1920s. The Taylors had taught in Paris before the First World War and had become friends with the Scottish Colourist, S. J. Peploe (1871–1935), who regularly visited them in Kirkcudbright from 1918. The Taylors’ reputation as teachers was such that Robert Burns, Head of Painting at Edinburgh College of Art, encouraged his students to study with them. This introduced a younger generation of Edinburgh artists to Kirkcudbright, including Anne Redpath (1895–1965), Dorothy Nesbitt (1893–1974), Dorothy Johnstone (1892–1980), E. A. Walton’s daughter Cecile Walton (1891–1956), A. R. Sturrock (1885–1953) and William Miles Johnston (1893–1974). At the same time Glasgow-based artists and craft workers visited and stayed with the Taylors in Greengate Close or elsewhere in the town, including Helen S. Johnstone (1888–1931) originally from Troon, and the metalworker Agnes Harvey (1874–1947) and jeweller Mary Thew (1876–1953). The artist Anna Hotchkis (1885–1984) was a long-term resident of the close, but she also travelled and worked in China in the 1930s.

By the 1920s journalists were writing about the ‘Greengate Close coterie’ of women artists gathered around Jessie M. King and living as her tenants in Greengate Close. In 1931, Dorothy L. Sayers based her crime novel The Five Red Herrings in the artists’ communities of Kirkcudbright and Gatehouse of Fleet, which she knew through her friendship with the daughters of William Robson.

== Dumfries and Galloway Fine Arts Society ==
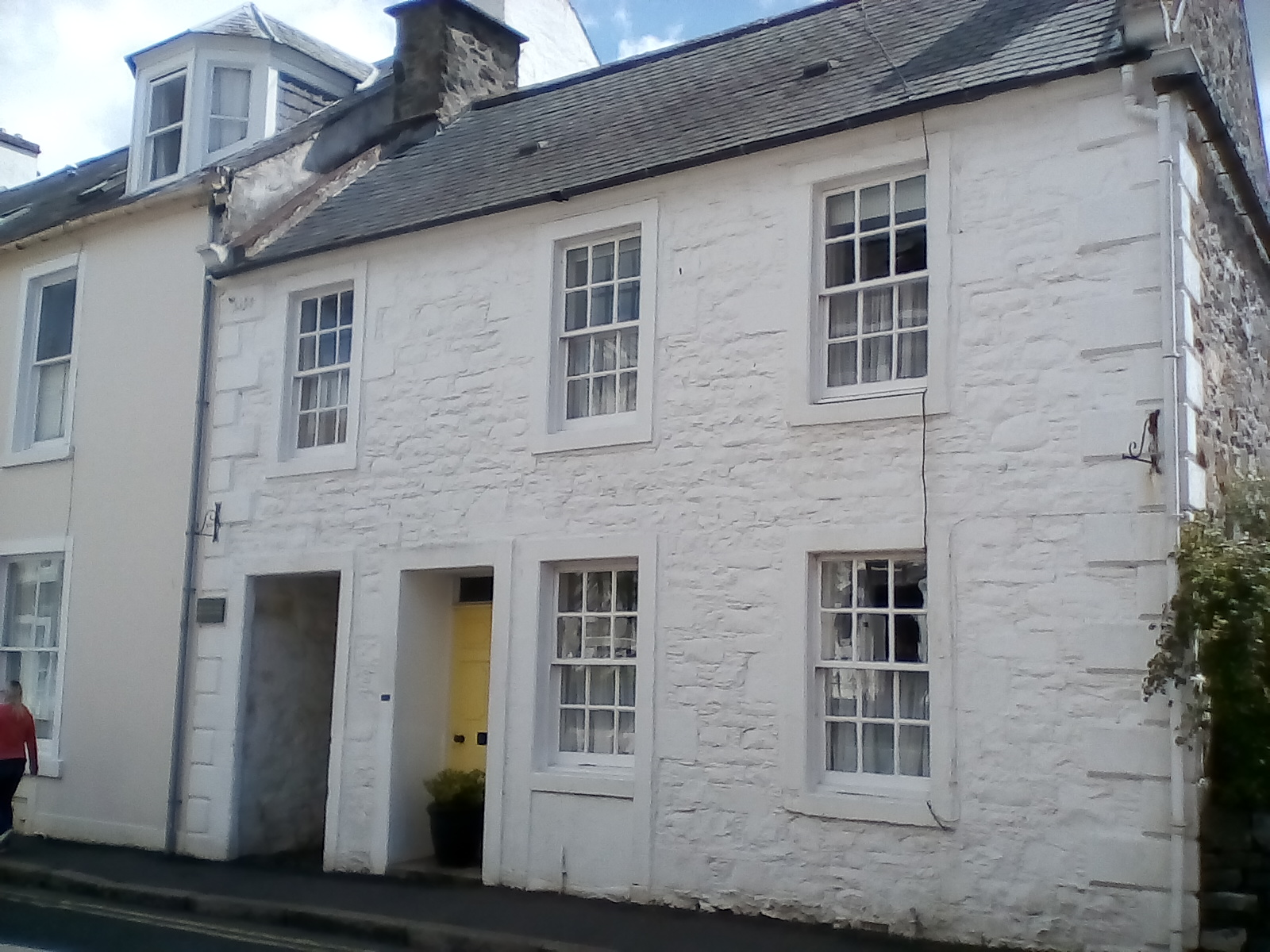
The Yellow Door Studio of Tim and Mary Jeffs

In 1922, E. A. Hornel, Jessie M. King, E. A. Taylor along with the Dumfries artists Christian Jane Fergusson (1876–1957) and Robert Cairns (1866–1944), had founded the Dumfries and Galloway Fine Arts Society, which continues to the present. All this activity maintained Kirkcudbright’s reputation as an artistic community and continued to attract artists and craft workers in the 1930s and 1940s, including Lena Alexander (1899–1983) and Tim Jeffs (1904–1975).

== Jankel Adler ==
The influential Polish Jewish artist Jankel Adler (1895–1949), lived and worked here from 1941 to 1943. He sought refuge in Scotland during the Second World War and moved to live in the artists' colony in Kirkcudbright. He used an old outbuilding, attached to the Old Mill Studio in Millburn Street as his studio where his work at this time include his "Venus of Kirkcudbright".

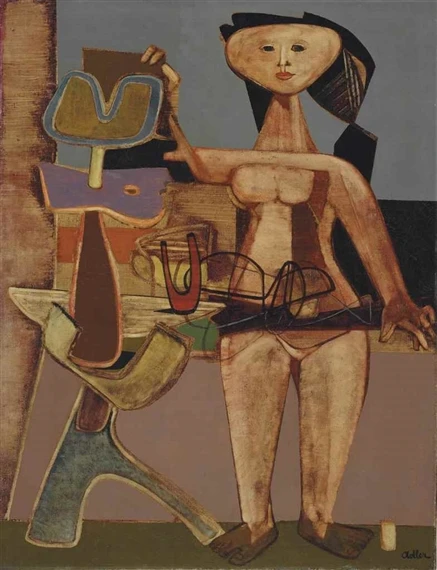
"Venus of Kirkcudbright" (1943) by Jankel Adler

== New phase ==
The artistic community declined gradually through the second half of the 20th century, and some have dated the end of the artists’ community to 1984 when Anna Hotchkis died (she was seen as the last of the 1940s artists). However, the establishment in 2010 of a Wasps Studios facility, providing 14 studio spaces in the town, may be seen to mark a new phase in Kirkcudbright’s artistic story.
