= Oscar Paterson =

Scottish stained glass artist (1863–1934)

Oscar Paterson (1863 – 1934) was a Scottish artist based in Glasgow, who specialised in stained glass.

== Work ==
Paterson's work has been described as "the epitome of the Glasgow Style", and is still celebrated today. He is best known for his stained glass, although he also designed jewellery. His best known works include the Argyll Window in Saint Giles Cathedral, Edinburgh (1896) and windows depicting both the nativity (Mayfield Church, 1912) and the Crucifixion (The Church of the Good Shepherd, Murrayfield). He designed windows for many other Scottish churches, as well as works for secular locations such as Westover Hall in Hampshire and Pollokshields Burgh Hall in Glasgow. His work was exhibited in the city on at least two separate occasions: in 1895 his "Designs for Leaded Glass" was shown and, in 1897, a "Jewel Casket" (in silver and enamel). The latter sold for £26. He was very unusual for the time in that he manufactured many of his own materials.

== Early life ==
Paterson was born in the Glasgow Gorbals area in 1863. His parents were Patrick Paterson and Agnes Ann Paterson M.S. Cruickshank. He opened a studio there in West Regent Street in 1889, after returning from London where he was educated. While in London, he had begun to tutor in glass technology and he continued this after his move back to Glasgow. Unlike many of his contemporaries, he gave credit to his pupils and assistants where due. One of the most notable assistants to work in Paterson's studio was John Stark Melville, who attended the Glasgow School of Art in the 1881-2 session His occupation is listed in the student registers as "Glass Painter", and it is likely that he continued to improve his skills at the School of Art while working under Paterson.

== Style ==
Paterson's work is very evocative of the Glasgow Style which was beginning to develop at this time. It is likely that his work influenced other younger artists, who are now associated very much with the Glasgow art movement at the turn in the early years of the twentieth century. His consideration of the use of colour and images from nature and the wider world in which he lived is evident in his designs. These images are developed in the work of designers like Jessie M. King and E. A. Taylor. A similar regard is given to the use of colour, shape and space in the textile designs of Anne MacBeth and her later contemporaries.

== Later life ==
Paterson continued to gain commissions even after his retirement in 1931. Today, his work can be seen in many churches including Saint Magnus' Cathedral Kirkwall and in specialist collections such as the Hunterian Museum, Glasgow University.
