= List of public art in Dumfries and Galloway =

Map of Scotland with the Dumfries and Galloway council area highlighted

This is a list of public art in Dumfries and Galloway, one of the 32 local government council areas of Scotland.

Dumfries and Galloway comprises the historic counties of Dumfriesshire and the two counties collectively known as Galloway, the Stewartry of Kirkcudbright and Wigtownshire. The council area borders South Ayrshire, East Ayrshire, South Lanarkshire, the Scottish Borders, Cumbria in England, the Solway Firth and to the west the Irish Sea. This list applies only to works of public art on permanent display in an outdoor public space and does not, for example, include artworks in museums.

== Annan ==
Image	Title / subject	Location and coordinates	Date	Artist / designer	Type	Material	Dimensions	Designation	Wikidata	Notes
	Robert the Bruce	The Town Hall, Annan	1875	R Smith of Glasgow (architect)	Statue on platform	Stone		Category B		
	Edward Irving	Parish Churchyard, Annan	1892	Dods of Dumfries	Statue on pedestal	Marble and granite		Category B		
	War memorial	High Street, Annan	1921	Henry Price	Statue on pedestal	Bronze and marble				

== Balmaclellan ==
Image	Title / subject	Location and coordinates	Date	Artist / designer	Type	Material	Dimensions	Designation	Wikidata	Notes
	Crimean War memorial	Balmaclellan Parish Church	c. 1856		Capped pillar	Sandstone	1.9m tall	Category B		
	War memorial	Balmaclellan	c. 1920s		Obelisk	Stone				

== Canonbie ==
Image	Title / subject	Location and coordinates	Date	Artist / designer	Type	Material	Dimensions	Designation	Wikidata	Notes
More images	War memorial	Canonbie	1921	Thomas J Clapperton	Statue on pedestal	Bronze and granite	4.0m high	Category C	Q56614881	

== Carsphairn ==
Image	Title / subject	Location and coordinates	Date	Artist / designer	Type	Material	Dimensions	Designation	Wikidata	Notes
	War memorial	Carsphairn	1923	Messers Dods and Son	Cairn	Stone				

== Corsock ==
Image	Title / subject	Location and coordinates	Date	Artist / designer	Type	Material	Dimensions	Designation	Wikidata	Notes
	War memorial	Burnside, Corsock	c. 1920s		Obelisk on pedestal	Granite				

== Dalbeattie ==
Image	Title / subject	Location and coordinates	Date	Artist / designer	Type	Material	Dimensions	Designation	Wikidata	Notes
	War memorial	Colliston Park, Dalbeattie	1921	William Stewart MacGeorge and EA Hornel (architect)	Sculpture on column and pedestal with plaques	Granite and bronze				
	War memorial	St Peter's Catholic Church, Dalbeattie			Celtic wheel cross	Stone and brick				

== Dumfries ==
Image	Title / subject	Location and coordinates	Date	Artist / designer	Type	Material	Dimensions	Designation	Wikidata	Notes
More images	Monument to Charles Douglas, 3rd Duke of Queensberry	English Street, Dumfries	1780	Robert Adam	Column on pedestal and steps	Stone		Category A	Q17570300	
More images	Robert Burns	Church Place, Dumfries	1882	Amelia Robertson Hill	Statue on pedestal	Marble and stone		Category B	Q17793546	
	RMS Titanic memorial	Dock Park, Dumfries	1913		Obelisk	Granite				
	War memorial	St John's Church, Dumfries	1922		Statue on pedestal	Stone				
More images	War memorial	New Abbey Road, Maxwelltown		Henry Price	Statue on pedestal	Bronze and stone	4.5m high			
	The Crossing (Lady Devorgilla)	Whitesands, Dumfries	1998	Matt Baker, Dan Dubowitz	Sculpture	Stone				
More images	Jean Armour	Dumfries	2004	Nautilus Burleighfield foundry	Statue group on pedestal	Bronze and granite				

== Ecclefechan ==
Image	Title / subject	Location and coordinates	Date	Artist / designer	Type	Material	Dimensions	Designation	Wikidata	Notes
More images	Thomas Carlyle	Ecclefechan	1929	MacDonald & Creswick of Edinburgh after Joseph Edgar Boehm	Seated statue on pedestal	Bronze and stone		Category B	Q17804310	Replica of 1882 original by Boehm in London

== Gatehouse of Fleet ==
Image	Title / subject	Location and coordinates	Date	Artist / designer	Type	Material	Dimensions	Designation	Wikidata	Notes
More images	War memorial	Gatehouse of Fleet	1921		Celtic cross on pedestal	Granite				

== Gretna ==
Image	Title / subject	Location and coordinates	Date	Artist / designer	Type	Material	Dimensions	Designation	Wikidata	Notes
	War memorial	Opposite Old Parish Church, Gretna Green	1921	Fergus J Currie	Cross on pedestal	Stone				
	Gretna Munitions Girls	Central Avenue, Gretna	2016	Andrew Brown	Sculpture group on base	Bronze and granite	2.5m tall			

== Isle of Whithorn ==
Image	Title / subject	Location and coordinates	Date	Artist / designer	Type	Material	Dimensions	Designation	Wikidata	Notes
	War memorial	Isle of Whithorn	c, 1920s		Celtic cross on pedestal	Stone				

== Kirkcudbright ==
Image	Title / subject	Location and coordinates	Date	Artist / designer	Type	Material	Dimensions	Designation	Wikidata	Notes
	War memorial	Castle Street, Kirkcudbright	1921	George Henry Paulin	Statue group on pedestal/ cairn	Bronze and rock		Category C		
	Seafarer's memorial	The Harbour, Kirkcudbright	1994	Charlie Easterfield	Statue group on pedestal	Wood and stone				

== Kirkpatrick Durham ==
Image	Title / subject	Location and coordinates	Date	Artist / designer	Type	Material	Dimensions	Designation	Wikidata	Notes
	War memorial	Kirkpatrick Durham	c. 1920s		Obelisk on plinth and steps	Granite				

== Kirkpatrick Fleming ==
Image	Title / subject	Location and coordinates	Date	Artist / designer	Type	Material	Dimensions	Designation	Wikidata	Notes
	War memorial	Kirkpatrick Fleming	c. 1920s	J W Dods and Son (Masons)	Obelisk on pedestal	Granite	4.8m tall			

== Langholm ==
Image	Title / subject	Location and coordinates	Date	Artist / designer	Type	Material	Dimensions	Designation	Wikidata	Notes
	Monument to Sir John Malcolm	Whita Hill, Langholm	1836	Robert Howe (architect)	Obelisk	Stone		Category B	Q17809222	
	Admiral Sir Pulteney Malcolm	Library Garden, Langholm	1842	David Dunbar	Statue on pedestal	Marble and granite		Category C		
More images	War memorial	Langholm	1921	Henry Charles Fehr	Statue on pedestal	Bronze and granite			Q114168682	

== Lochmaben ==
Image	Title / subject	Location and coordinates	Date	Artist / designer	Type	Material	Dimensions	Designation	Wikidata	Notes
More images	Robert the Bruce	Lochmaben	1879	John Hutchison	Statue on pedestal	Bronze and stone				
	Rev. William Graham	Town Hall, Lochmaben	1887		Statue in niche	Stone				

== Lockerbie ==
Image	Title / subject	Location and coordinates	Date	Artist / designer	Type	Material	Dimensions	Designation	Wikidata	Notes
	War memorial	High Street, Lockerbie	1922	Henry Charles Fehr	Statue on pedestal	Bronze and stone				

== Mennock ==
Image	Title / subject	Location and coordinates	Date	Artist / designer	Type	Material	Dimensions	Designation	Wikidata	Notes
More images	War memorial	Mennock	1922	George Frampton	Obelisk with plaque	Granite, bronze and alabaster				

== Moffat ==
Image	Title / subject	Location and coordinates	Date	Artist / designer	Type	Material	Dimensions	Designation	Wikidata	Notes
More images	Ram fountain	High Street, Moffat	1875	William Brodie	Sculpture on cairn with basins	Bronze and stone boulders		Category B	Q17791208	
	War memorial	Moffat	1920	Alexander Carrick & Reginald Fairlie (architect)	Pillar on pedestal	Stone				
More images	Hugh Dowding, 1st Baron Dowding	Station Park, Moffat	1972	Scott Sutherland & D Bruce Walker (designer)	Plaque and surround	Bronze and sandstone				

== Penpont ==
Image	Title / subject	Location and coordinates	Date	Artist / designer	Type	Material	Dimensions	Designation	Wikidata	Notes
More images	War memorial	Penpont	1921	William Kellock Brown	Statue on pedestal	Bronze and stone				

== Portpatrick ==
Image	Title / subject	Location and coordinates	Date	Artist / designer	Type	Material	Dimensions	Designation	Wikidata	Notes
More images	War memorial	Portpatrick			Celtic cross on pedestal	Granite				
	MV Princess Victoria memorial	Portpatrick			Plaque	Bronze and marble				

== Stranraer ==
Image	Title / subject	Location and coordinates	Date	Artist / designer	Type	Material	Dimensions	Designation	Wikidata	Notes
	War memorial	Lewis Street, Stranraer	1920		Statue on pedestal	Bronze and granite		Category B	Q17794419	
	MV Princess Victoria memorial	Agnew Park, Stranraer			Anchor and memorial stone					

== Thornhill ==
Image	Title / subject	Location and coordinates	Date	Artist / designer	Type	Material	Dimensions	Designation	Wikidata	Notes
	Mercat cross	Thornhill	1714	James Smith	Pillar on pedestal	Stone		Category A		
	Joseph Thomson	Thornhill	1897	Charles MacBride	Bust on pedestal with plaques	Bronze and stone		Category B		

== Whithorn ==
Image	Title / subject	Location and coordinates	Date	Artist / designer	Type	Material	Dimensions	Designation	Wikidata	Notes
	War memorial	Main Street, Whithorn	c. 1920s		Pillar on pedestal	Granite				

== Wigtown ==
Image	Title / subject	Location and coordinates	Date	Artist / designer	Type	Material	Dimensions	Designation	Wikidata	Notes
	Mercat cross	The Square, Wigtown	1816		Cross on steps	Stone		Category B		
	Covenanters Memorial	Windy Hill, Wigtown	1858		Obelisk on pedestal	Stone		Category B	Q17798249	
	War memorial	Church Lane, Wigtown	1922		Cenotaph	Stone				
