= Christian Jane Fergusson =

Scottish painter (1876–1957)

- Born: 14 September 1876; Dumfries
- Died: 5 January 1957 (aged 80); Dumfries
- Education: Dumfries Academy; Crystal Palace School of Art; Glasgow School of Art
- Known for: Painting

Christian Jane Fergusson, née Stark, (14 September 1876 – 5 January 1957), was a Scottish painter, who was associated with the Glasgow School and known for her landscape and still life works.

== Biography ==
Fergusson, who sometimes signed her work as Chris J Fergusson, was born in Dumfries, one of five children of James Stark, a solicitor, and his wife Agnes Waugh Drape. She attended school at the Dumfries Academy before travelling in Europe where she visited France, Germany, Belgium and the Netherlands. When she returned to Britain, Fergusson studied at the Crystal Palace School of Art in London. From about 1900 to 1906 Fergusson attended the Glasgow School of Art, first as a student and then as a tutor. She was awarded one of the first Diplomas awarded at the School of Art. She also taught for a year between 1905 and 1906 on secondment at Kirkcudbright Academy and then as Principal Teacher of Art at the Glasgow High School for Girls. Later, she would also teach at the Benedictine Convent School in Dumfries.

As well as painting, Fergusson produced metalwork and tapestry pieces and came to be regarded as one of the group, later, known as the Glasgow Girls. She was also active in the Suffragette movement. Whilst studying at Glasgow she became engaged to David Fergusson, a young solicitor, whom she married in 1908. The couple settled in Maxwelltown where they began to raise a family. The family home was decorated in Art Nouveau style by Fergusson.

Throughout the 1920s and 1930s Fergusson travelled widely in Scotland and painted several views of the Isle of Arran, the East Neuk of Fife and of St. Abbs in Berwickshire which are considered among her best works. In 1922, a year after the birth of her third child, Fergusson was among the co-founders, along with Jessie M. King, E.A. Taylor and E.A. Hornel of the Dumfries and Galloway Fine Art Society, which in its early years, exhibited work by many distinguished Scottish artists. In 1928 Fergusson was elected to the Society of Scottish Artists. Fergusson won the Lauder Award from the Glasgow Society of Lady Artists three times, in 1933, 1938 and in 1954. An exhibition of some 116 paintings by Fergusson was held in Dumfries in 1952 and a retrospective exhibition of her work was held in the same town in 1957. Two works by Fergusson, Salutation Inn, Dumfries and The Brig-end of Dumfries hang in the Dumfries Council Chamber Room.
