= Station Square (disambiguation) =

Station Square is an indoor and outdoor shopping and entertainment complex in Pittsburgh, Pennsylvania.

Station Square may also refer to:

- Granton Station Square, a public square in Edinburgh, Scotland
- Station Square station, a light rail station in Pittsburgh, Pennsylvania, US
- Station Square (Tbilisi Metro), a metro station in Tbilisi, Georgia
- Station Square (Metrotown), an urban development in Burnaby, British Columbia
- Station Square (Rutherford), a traffic circle in New Jersey, US
- Station Square (Sonic the Hedgehog), a location in the Sonic Adventure video game
