= Kirkcudbright Academy =

Location
- St Marys Wynd; Kirkcudbright, Dumfries and Galloway, DG6 4JN; Scotland; 54.8353°N 4.0577°W

Information
- Motto: Radicem Firmant Frondes (from the roots comes strength)
- Established: By 1582; 444 years ago
- School district: Kirkcudbrightshire
- Rector: A Tuffery
- Gender: Mixed
- Enrolment: 455
- Website: https://kirkcudbright.academy/

Kirkcudbright Academy is a state funded, six-year secondary school in Kirkcudbright, Scotland with about 400 pupils and 87 staff including teaching, support and administration.

== Notable alumni ==
- Jennie Adamson, Labour Party politician, junior minister in Clement Attlee's post-war Labour government
- Samuel Anderson (Australian settler), first settler in Westernport, Victoria
- John Brown of Wamphray, exiled minister of the Church of Scotland, the most important Scottish theologian of the period known as the Killing Time (1660–1688). One of the strongest defenders of the Covenanter cause
- Katrina Bryan, actress
- Malcolm Caldwell, (1931-1978) academic and Marxist writer, twice chair of the Campaign for Nuclear Disarmament. Murdered a few hours after meeting Pol Pot in Cambodia. Dux of the academy in 1949.
- Finlay Carson, Scottish Conservative Party MSP for the Galloway and West Dumfries constituency
- Robert Carson, leading expert on Roman coins, and Keeper of Coins and Medals at the British Museum from 1978 to 1983
- John Corrie, Scottish Conservative and Unionist Party politician, former MP & MEP
- David Coulthard, former Formula One racing driver
- James Craik, Physician General (precursor of the Surgeon General) of the United States Army, and George Washington's physician and friend
- John Duncan, Adventurer, explorer and author
- John Erskine, 1st Baron Erskine of Rerrick, banker, Governor of Northern Ireland
- Dr Maxwell Garthshore, Scottish physician who practiced as an Accoucheur and was a Fellow of the Royal Society
- Bazil Gordon, tobacco merchant who by the time of his death was believed to be America's richest man and its first millionaire
- Thomas Gordon, Scottish writer and Commonwealth man
- Sir Robin Gray, former MP and 23rd Speaker of the New Zealand House of Representatives
- William Greggan, Olympian who won a silver medal as a member of the Liverpool Police team in the Tug of war at the 1908 Summer Olympics
- George Henry, artist
- Edward Atkinson Hornel, painter
- Innes Ireland, former Formula One racing driver. Winner of the 1961 United States Grand Prix
- David S. Kennedy, former New York Merchant Banker - in the early 1800s his bank Kennedy & Maitland was known as one of the "greatest commercial houses in the United States". Served in several roles including as the 23rd President in the charitable Saint Andrew's Society of the State of New York.
- George Kerr (New Brunswick politician)
- Robert Lenox, brother of David above, American businessman and property investor; held civil positions including two periods as an Alderman of New York; being one of the founders of the Lying-in Hospital, along with Alexander Hamilton, and later its president; President of New York Chamber of Commerce and a trustee of Princeton College
- Bert MacLachlan, former professional football player who played for Aston Villa F.C., Aberdeen F.C. and Heart of Midlothian F.C.
- David MacMyn, former rugby union international, captain of the British and Irish Lions on the 1927 British Lions tour to Argentina later a Selector as President of the Scottish Rugby Union
- Bob McDougall, former professional football player who played for Liverpool FC
- Stafford McDowall, rugby player currently playing with Scotland and Glasgow Warriors
- Sir John McMichael FRSE LLD, cardiologist. He developed the Royal Postgraduate Medical School at Hammersmith.
- James McMonies, former Canadian businessman and politician
- Alexander Manson FRSE physician based in Nottingham who pioneered the use of iodine in medicine
- Robert Milligan, Liberal Party politician and the first mayor of Bradford
- William Mouncey, artist
- Sir John Nairne, 1st Baronet, former Chief Cashier then Director of the Bank of England and a BBC Governor
- Emma Pollock, singer-songwriter, musician, and a founding member of the bands The Delgados, The Burns Unit and The Fruit Tree Foundation
- Arthur Smith (rugby union), former rugby union player winning 33 caps for Scotland including some as captain, twice selected to tour with the British and Irish Lions, as a player on the 1955 British Lions tour to South Africa and as captain on the 1962 British Lions tour to South Africa
- Samuel Smith, Liberal politician, former MP and co-founder of Edge Hill University
- Edward Telfair, American Revolutionary, slave owner, three time Governor of the state of Georgia, member of the Continental Congress, and signatory to the Articles of Confederation
- George Thompson (Scottish National Party politician), MP and Roman Catholic priest
- James Williamson (Victorian politician), banker, pastoralist and politician in Australia
- James Wolffe QC, Scottish lawyer who was Lord Advocate from 2016-2021.
- Silas Simpson, 34th Scot and first Alumini to climb Mount Everest in 2026.

== Notable staff ==
- Christian Jane Fergusson, artist taught for a year between 1905 and 1906 on secondment
- George Thompson, taught French and German.

== See also ==
- List of the oldest schools in the United Kingdom
