= Mary Augusta Mullikin =

American painter

- Born: May 20, 1874; Cincinnati, Ohio
- Died: February 11, 1964 (aged 89); Austin, Texas
- Known for: Painting
- Notable work: The Nine Sacred Mountains of China with Anna Hotchkis

Mary Augusta Mullikin (born 1874 in Ohio; died 1964) was an American painter who spent almost 30 years in China from 1920 to the end of World War II. Member of the American Federation of Art. Joint author with Anna Hotchkis, also a painter, of two books of their travels in China, illustrated by themselves, entitled Buddhist Sculptures of the Yun Kang Caves (Librairie française, Peiping, 1935) and The Nine Sacred Mountains of China (Vetch and Lee, Hong Kong, 1973). She also contributed to the National Geographic magazine a number of articles accompanied by her drawings, including "China's Great Wall of Sculpture" in the March 1938 National Geographic (pp 313–348) on the earliest Buddhist sculptures in what were known as the Yun Kang caves, and "Tài Shan, Sacred Mountain of the East" in June 1945. Her paintings and drawings were also featured in exhibitions at the Corcoran Gallery in Washington, D.C., and at the Philadelphia Academy, as well as in the Brook Street Galleries in London and numerous exhibitions in China.

== Early life ==
From 1901 to 1921, she was an Art Professor at Lasell Seminary for Young Women (now Lasell College) in Newton, MA. In 1920 she left Boston for a six-month visit with her elder sister Katherine and Katherine's husband, Edward Kingston Lowry, an export-import merchant and property manager affiliated with the Methodist Mission, in the Lowries' home in Tianjin, China. Mullikin's six-month stay in Tianjin eventually extended to 26 years.

== Travels in China ==
Mullikin travelled widely in China and to Korea and Japan during the 1930s. She published a book via the Librairie française, a Peking publishing firm, on early Buddhist sculptures. She then set to writing a book about the sacred Daoist and Buddhist mountains and travelled an estimated 10,000 kilometres through China.

Due to health problems Mullikin did not travel again in China. She devoted herself to the care of her sister Katherine. In July 1937 the Japanese occupation began, and Mullikin and the Lowries were trapped in Tianjin until the end of World War II. Turned out of her home, Mullikin survived by staying with Swiss friends, and by painting pictures of Chinese ancestors from old photographs, and by selling property. She was finally repatriated in 1946.

She sold a number of her paintings to members of the International community located in Tianjin, between 1920 and the start of World War II.

== Later life ==
Mullikin safely made her way to her niece and nephew at the United States Embassy in Paris, after she arrived in England. From there, she returned with them to the United States. In 1947 they set off for Africa, where Mr. Taylor served as consul general in Nairobi, Kenya Colony, East Africa. After two years he transferred back to Washington, so Mullikin, now 75, accompanied her niece and nephew-in-law to make her home in America. Her arrival was chronicled by an article in The Christian Science Monitor of August 29, 1949, together with a staff photo which made the mistake of spelling her last name “Millikin”.

She did considerable landscape painting in the Nairobi area and despite difficulty getting indigenous people to pose, she also did some figures. These paintings have seemed to vanish, although we know she received them in the US. However, as far as we can determine, they have never appeared on the market. (Her family still holds most of those paintings) She had a policy of firmly noting her complete name on most canvases. Some were signed MM with a date, mostly in the interim between the end of the war and her departure for England, so it is unlikely that they would not be identifiable.

Mullikin died in Austin, Texas in February 1964 and was buried in Cincinnati.

After her death Anna Hotchkis undertook to see to the publication of their book The Nine Sacred Mountains of China. Their publisher, Henri Vetch, had moved to Hong Kong during the war and was preoccupied with publishing books for the Hong Kong University. However, the book finally appeared under his imprint in 1973.

== Publications ==
- “The Buddhist Sculptures at the Yun Kang Caves”, The Studio, vol cviii, no 497, August 1934;
- “An Artists’ Party in China”, The Studio, vol cx, no 512, November 1935;
- “China’s Great Wall of Sculpture” (Wu Tai Shan), National Geographic, March 1938;
- “Tai Shan, Sacred Mountain of the East”, National Geographic, lxxxvii, June 1945;
- “Tai Shan, most revered of the Five Sacred Mountains of China", Illustrated London News, October 1945, 423–425.

With Anna Hotchkis

- Buddhist Sculptures of the Yun Kang Caves (Henri Vetch, Peking, 1935)
- The Nine Sacred Mountains of China (Vetch & Lee, Hong Kong, 1973)
