= Anna Hotchkis =

Scottish artist, writer and lecturer (1885–1984)

Anna Mary Hotchkis RSA
- Born: 30 May 1885; Renfrewshire, Scotland
- Died: 14 October 1984 (aged 99); Kirkcudbright, Scotland
- Known for: Painting, Printmaking
- Notable work: The Nine Sacred Mountains of China with Mary Mullikin

Anna Mary Hotchkis RSA (30 May 1885 – 14 October 1984) was a Scottish artist, writer and lecturer on art. She exhibited in London, Beijing, Hong Kong and at exhibitions in Scotland. She was a member of and exhibited with the Royal Scottish Academy 1915-1968.

== Early life ==
Hotchkis was born in Crookston House, Renfrewshire, Scotland. She had three sisters, Margaret, Catherine and Isobel (1879–1947, also a painter), and six brothers, only one of whom, Richard, is known to have survived into adulthood.

Hotchkis inherited a love of painting from her mother and wanted to be an artist from age 14. She began formal training at the Glasgow School of Art at age 21, despite objections from parents who were worried about her delicate health. Her family moved to Edinburgh in 1907, and she enrolled at the Edinburgh College of Art studying under Robert Burns for three years. She completed her studies but left without taking a diploma. Around this time, her sisters Anna, Margaret and Isobel, went to Munich to study art under Hans Lasker.

At the suggestion of her Edinburgh teacher, Hotchkis set up a studio in the small town of Kirkcudbright, initially rented then bought from Jessie M. King, an acquaintance of her teacher. She kept the studio from 1915 until her death in 1984.

== First encounter with China ==
In 1922 Hotchkis travelled to China via the United States, Japan and Korea to visit her sister Catherine in Mukden (now Shenyang), where since 1915 she had established and worked in a girls’ school for the YWCA. After Mukden, she spent three months in Shanghai, where she held an exhibition of her work. While painting child labourers at a cotton factory there she caught a severe infection, which caused her to return to Mukden and then move to Peking for treatment. She decided to stay in Peking to take up an offer to fill in for the art teacher at Yenching University.

Hotchkis taught at Yenching for a year and then returned to Scotland in 1924, travelling on the Trans-Siberian Express to Moscow, where she stayed with the Quaker mission, then home to London via Berlin. She brought back with her over 70 pictures which she exhibited in the Brook Street Gallery in London. She returned to China in 1926, lodging with a Chinese family in Peking, where she remained until the Second Sino-Japanese War in 1937.

== Travels in China ==
In July 1924, while in convalescence at her sister's holiday house at the seaside resort of Beidaihe, Hotchkis had met the American painter Mary Augusta Mullikin. The two became good friends and after Hotchkis's return to China travelled extensively together, writing several books and articles about their travels there. Their first trip together was to Japan and Korea in 1927.

In 1929 Hotchkis visited her sisters in the UK, travelling via Japan and Los Angeles. She returned to China the following year, and in September 1931 she and Mullikin made their first trip to the Yungang Grottoes near the city of Datong in northern Shanxi province. They returned there the following June, having conceived the idea of publishing a book about the cave sculptures of Yungang, to be illustrated with their own paintings and drawings. They returned from Yungang via Hangzhou and the sacred island of Putuoshan, one of the Sacred Mountains of China.

In an attempt to find an English publisher for their intended book Hotchkis again visited the UK later in 1932, but she returned empty-handed. While in London she held another exhibition in the Brook Street Galleries, this time including paintings of the Yungang caves by Mullikin as well as her own. A notice in The Times was favourable: "As much for their enterprise and courage as for their judgement and talent are these ladies to be praised. Ignoring the usual interests of the globe-trotter, they have concentrated on artistic and archeological values peculiar to the places visited, which few have the opportunity to see." Eventually they found a publisher for the book in Peking, Henri Vetch, whose Librairie francaise specialised in books on Chinese themes. Vetch also suggested they travel around China to all of the most sacred Buddhist and Taoist mountains for another book. Meanwhile, a planned trip to Kaifeng and Luoyang in 1934 had to be cancelled because of fighting between warlords in the area, but in October 1934 the two artists managed to spend a week painting on Mount Tai in Shandong province, the pre-eminent sacred peak of the Taoists and one of the mountains Vetch suggested. This was apparently Hotchkis's first trip there although Mullikin had been several times already.

In 1935 Hotchkis moved into a house in Xie He Hutong in the eastern district of Peking. The house had been rented since 1931 by Laurence Sickman and his mother. When Sickman returned to the US in 1935, his mother wished to stay in Peking and invited Hotchkis to share the traditional courtyard house. In the spring of 1935 Mullikin came to Peking to stay with Hotchkis and to celebrate the publication of their book on the Yungang caves. On 27 August they set out from Peking on a self-styled "pilgrimage" to the sacred mountains. This they completed in two journeys, over two months in the autumn of 1935 (to northern Heng Shan, Wutai Shan and Hua Shan) and four months in the spring and summer of 1936 (to Song Shan, Emei Shan, southern Heng Shan and Jiu Hua Shan). On the steep slopes of Hua Shan in Shanxi province, the 50 year old Hotchkis suffered heart strain, but after resting in Beijing through the winter of 1935-36 was fit to continue.

== Return to Scotland ==
In July 1937 the Japanese Army, which had occupied the northern Chinese province of Manchuria since 1932,invaded the rest of China, taking Peking in August. Hotchkis reluctantly decided to leave China, returning by ship via Japan, then Hong Kong, Sri Lanka, India and Iraq to Greece. Another ship took her via Constantinople to Venice, where she caught a night train to Paris, and then back to London, where she arrived in April 1938, some five months after leaving Peking.

Hotchkis settled back in her studio in Kirkcudbright, Scotland. In 1940 she visited friends in Paris, where she caught one of the last boats from France to England during the German invasion. Back in Scotland during the war, she worked as a supervisor in a cordite factory in Dalbeattie for ten months, before retiring due to ill health and return to Kirkcudbright to paint. After the war she travelled extensively in Europe and North America, and made two trips to Hong Kong where Henri Vetch had re-established his publishing business. Her and Mullikin's second book, The Nine Sacred Mountains of China, was finally published there in December 1973, 37 years after the pilgrimage it documented.

Active and exhibiting almost until the end of her life, Hotchkis died peacefully in Kirkcudbright in 1985, in her 100th year. She never married or had children.

== Publications ==
(with Mary Augusta Mullikin):

- Buddhist Sculptures of the Yun Kang Caves (Henri Vetch, Peking, 1935)
- The Nine Sacred Mountains of China (Vetch & Lee, Hong Kong, 1973).
