= William Mouncey =

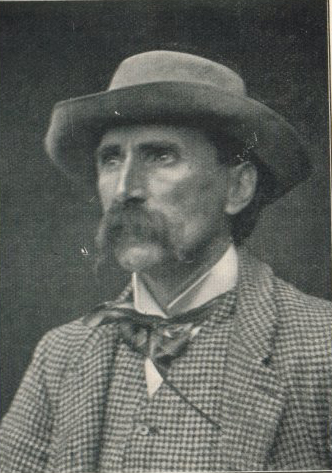
- Born: c. 1 January 1852; Kirkcudbright, Scotland
- Died: 12 December 1901 (aged 49); Kirkcudbright, Scotland

William Mouncey (born in Kirkcudbright in 1852, died 1901) was one of the founding artists of the Kirkcudbright Artists' Colony. He exhibited numerous works at the Royal Scottish Academy in Edinburgh, the Royal Glasgow Institute, Whitechapel Art Gallery, Carnegie Institute (Philadelphia), and in Dresden. In the last years of his life, his work was exhibited at Messrs James Connell & Sons Glasgow, and this helped to bring his work to the wide attention of the public.
