= Granton Gasworks railway station =

Disused railway station in Granton, Edinburgh

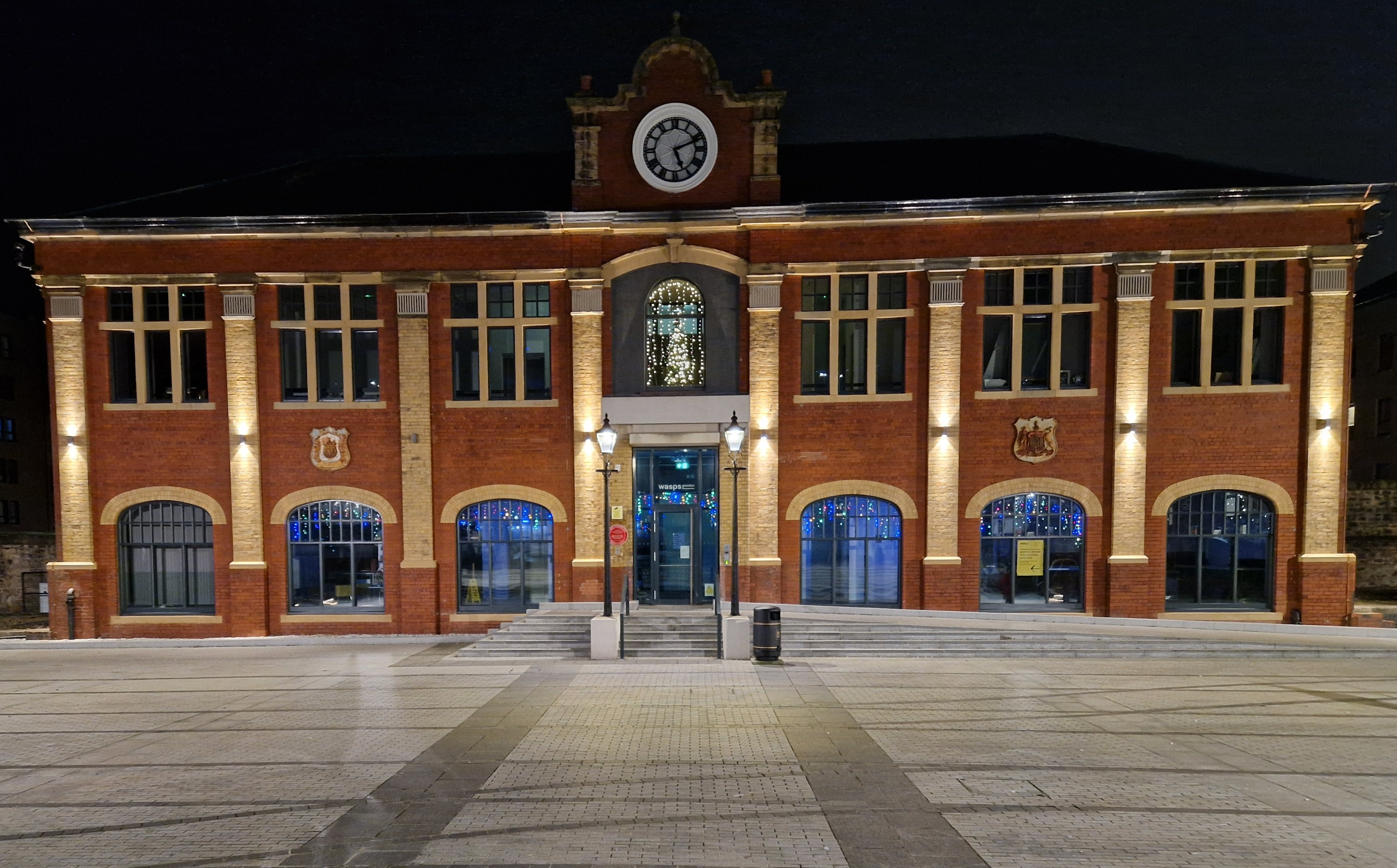
- Granton Gasworks railway station in December 2025.

General information
- Location: Granton, Edinburgh; Scotland
- Coordinates: 55.978334°N 3.2413191°W
- Grid reference: NT226768
- Owner: City of Edinburgh Council
- Platforms: 2

Construction
- Architect: Walter Ralph Herring
- Architectural style: Classical Edwardian

Other information
- Status: Disused; redeveloped

History
- Original company: Caledonian Railway
- Post-grouping: London, Midland and Scottish Railway

Key dates
- 1902: Opened
- 1942: Closed

Listed Building – Category B
- Official name: 4 Marine Drive and 11 West Shore Road, Granton Gasworks, Former Station/Office, including Railway Platform
- Designated: 10 November 1998
- Reference no.: LB45794
Location

Granton Gasworks railway station was a private railway station built to serve the Granton Gasworks in Granton, Edinburgh, Scotland that operated from 1902 to 1942. After laying vacant for decades, the station was brought back into use in 2023 as Granton Station Creative Works, a creative enterprise hub operated by the arts charity Wasps Studios.

== History ==
=== Operational history ===
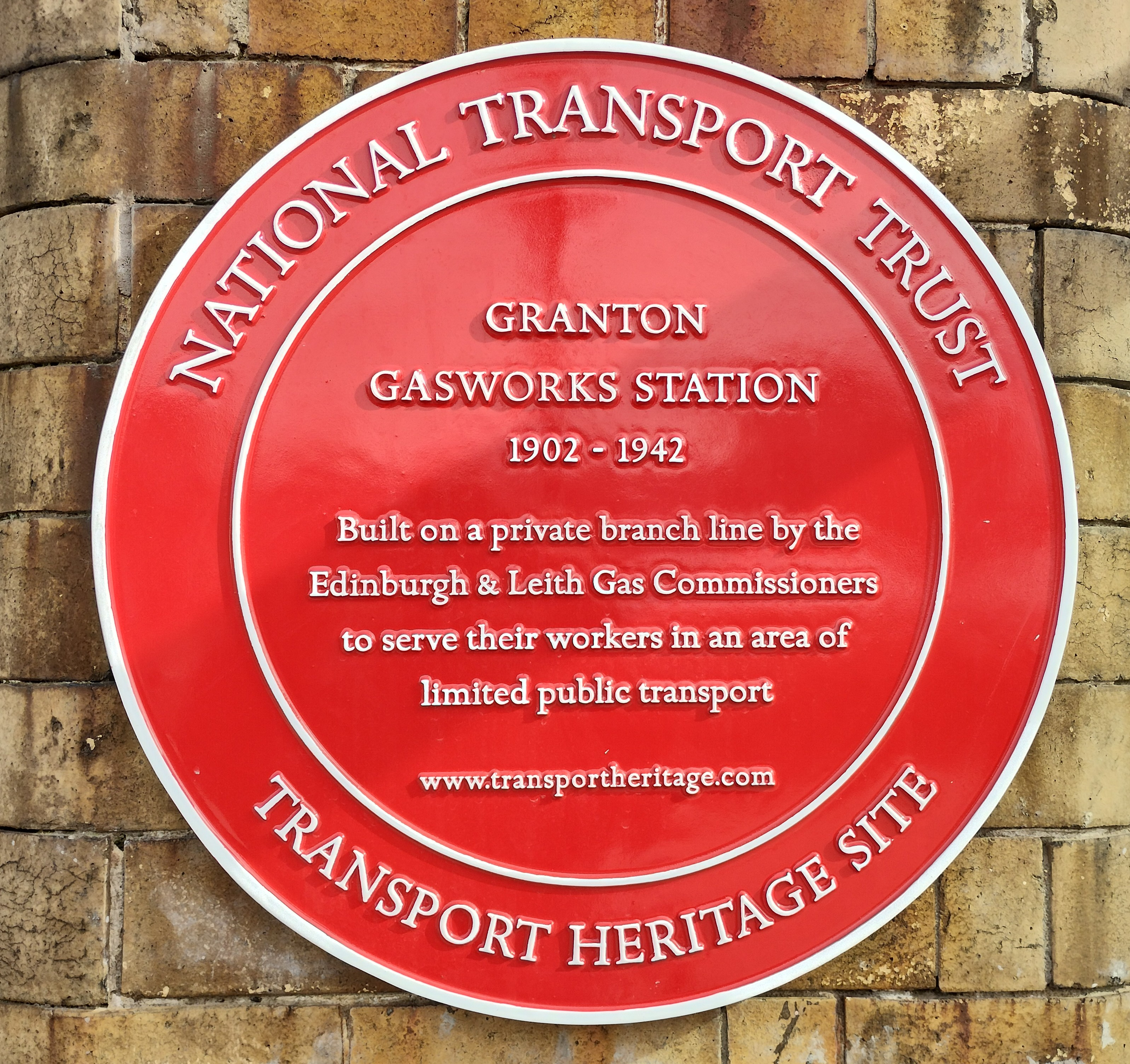
A National Transport Trust plaque affixed to the station.

Granton Gasworks railway station was a private station built for the Edinburgh and Leith Gas Commissioners to carry workers to and from the Granton Gasworks, which lay a short distance to the west, connected by a since-removed footbridge over the railway line. It was a terminal station linked to the Granton branch of the Caledonian Railway. Designed by Walter Ralph Herring (the chief engineer for the Granton Gasworks), construction of the station began in 1898. Services to the station commenced operation in October 1902, with the station being formally opened on 27 February 1903 by the Lady Provost of Edinburgh, Barbara Steel.

In addition to its transport role, the station also served as an office for the Gasworks and housed clocking-in machines for the workers as well as toilets and lockers. Until 1923, when the Caledonian Railway was grouped into the London, Midland and Scottish Railway, Gasworks workers were able to travel to and from Edinburgh Princes Street railway station at no cost. While the station did not appear in timetables, it was nonetheless used by residents as well as workers. A journey from Edinburgh Princes Street railway station to Granton Gasworks railway station took 12 minutes in 1907.

The station is two storeys high, built in a classical Edwardian style in red and yellow brick with ashlar sandstone dressings. The building bears decorative shields with the coat of arms of Edinburgh and Leith. The station had two platforms, one to the north and one to the south. A footbridge previously connected the station to the Gasworks to the west over the sidings. The station was granted category 'B' listed status by Historic Scotland in 1998, being described as "a good example of stately corporation architecture applied to an industrial site". Writing in 1984, Gifford, McWilliam, and Walker described the "bizarre and stately architecture [...] all red brick with yellow trim".

During the Second World War, it was identified by Nazi Germany as a potential bombing target but was never attacked. The station was closed in 1942 by the London, Midland and Scottish Railway as alternative transport links to the area had improved.

=== Subsequent history ===
Following its closure in 1942, Granton Gasworks railway station lay largely disused for the next 81 years while much of the surrounding land was redeveloped. In 2000, Foster and Partners brought forward plans for a wider redevelopment of the Granton Gasworks that included the retention of the station.

In 2018, Granton Gasworks railway station was acquired by the City of Edinburgh Council from National Grid as part of the wider Granton Waterfront regeneration. In 2020, the Council announced plans to redevelop the station into an "enterprise hub", with the adjacent former sidings to the west to be turned into a civic square. Designs for the redevelopment were prepared by ADP Architecture. Kier Group commenced work on the redevelopment in June 2021. In August 2021, the City of Edinburgh Council announced that the enterprise hub would be operated under a lease by the arts charity Wasps. In December 2022, the new civic square won a Future Cities Forum Winter Award in the "masterplanning - regeneration and mixed use" category. The civic square formally opened on 11 March 2023, being named "Granton Station Square". Granton Station Creative Works was opened by Wasps in autumn 2023. In December 2023, the restoration of the station was shortlisted in the BAM Nuttall Partnership Award category of the National Railway Heritage Awards. In March 2024, the restoration was shortlisted in the Royal Institution of Chartered Surveyors Awards Scotland.

In 2025, the City of Edinburgh Council commissioned 7N Architects and RankinFraser to design a renovation of the north and south platforms, with the existing surfaces replaced with soft landscaping.
