= Wasps Studios =

Arts and cultural organization in Scotland

Workshops & Artists Studio Provisions Scotland Ltd. (Wasps Studios) is a Scotland-based arts and cultural organization that was founded in 1977. The organization was created as an artist-run initiative to focus on creating long-lasting economic and creative impact in communities through their arts programming and acquisition of derelict buildings. After improving their properties, Wasps invites local organizations and arts businesses to fill the spaces, while also leaving room for affordable art studios and public interaction within the buildings. Through their registered business entities and registered charitable organizations, Wasps currently manages 18 locations in 14 cities and towns across Scotland, which have helped them support 330 artists through their Arts Enterprise Programme and 815 artist tenants in the 2023-2024 season.

Conversely, in 2023, the organization has generated controversy about their ability to maintain their artist-centred business model – focusing on expansion rather than maintaining their current properties. Wasps representatives like Karen Anderson deny these claims.

== History ==
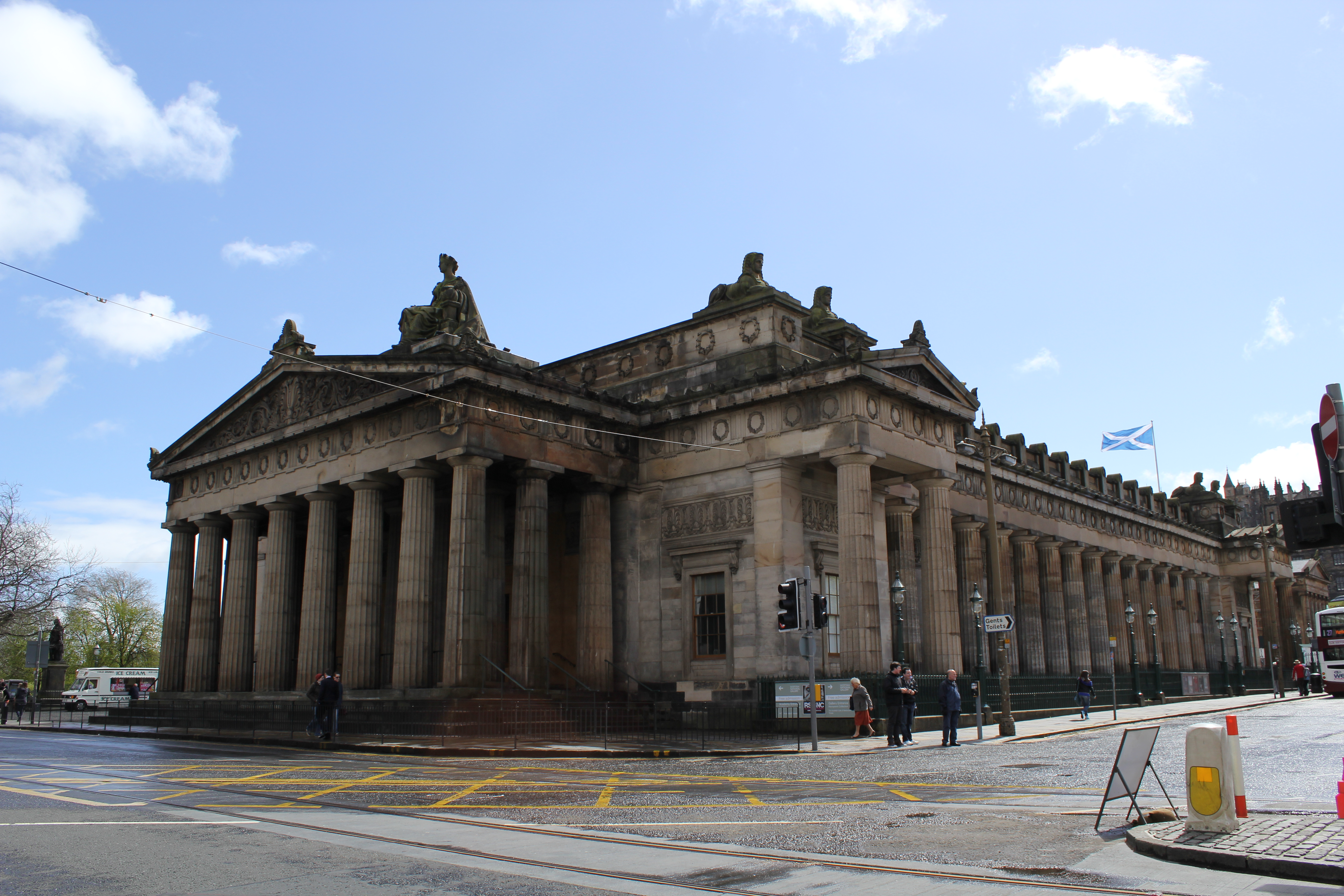
Royal Scottish Academy

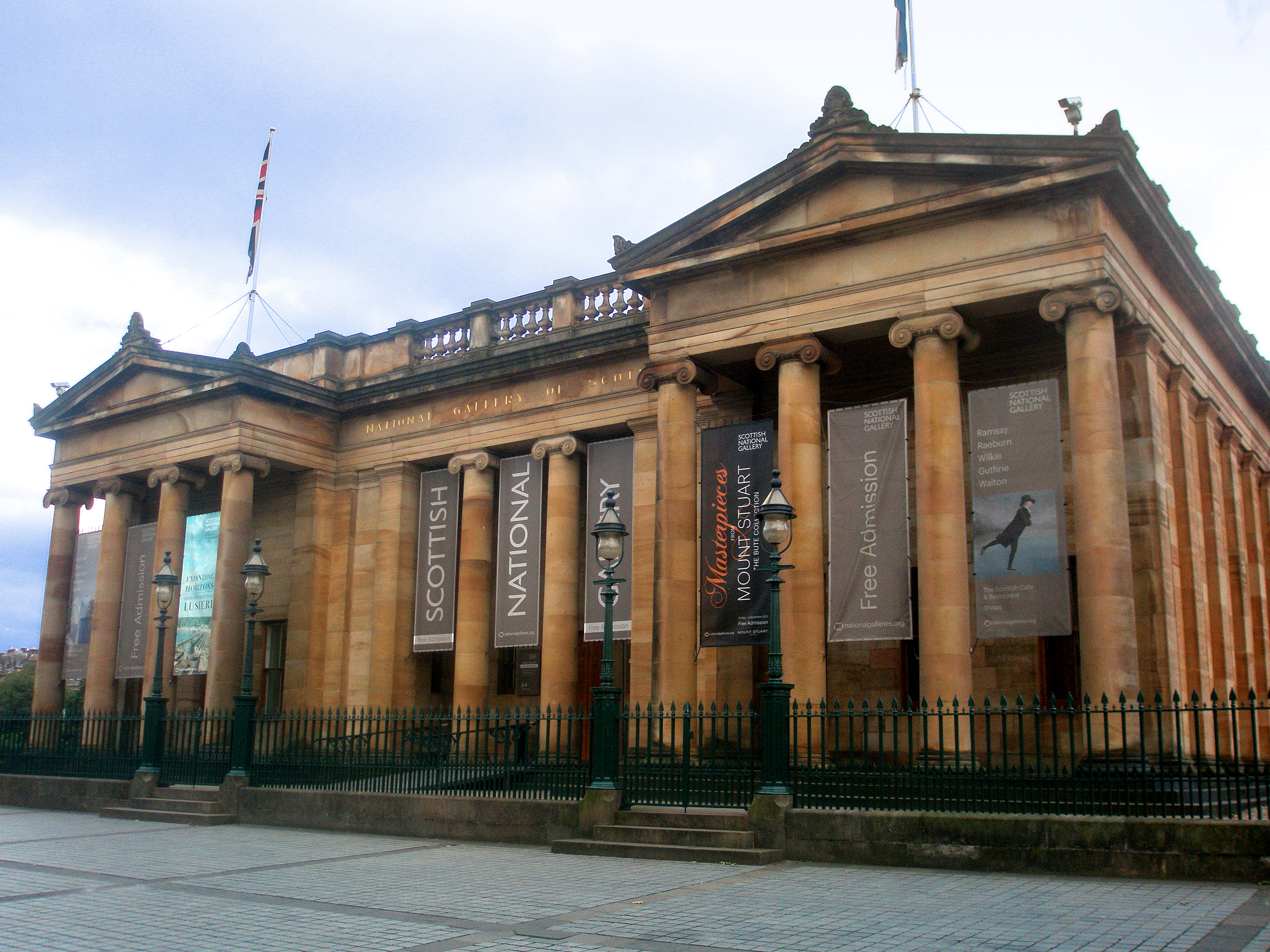
National Gallery of Scotland

Prior to the formation of Wasps Studios, the arts and cultural landscape in Scotland was dominated by traditional cultural institutions, such as the Royal Scottish Academy and the National Gallery of Scotland, and was perceived as being conservative and exclusive to the bourgeoisie. In the USA and Europe during the 1960s and 1970s, the artistic gatekeeping that was characteristic of similar controlling major institutions was being challenged, inspiring Scottish artists to organize and find space for their own studios, galleries, and workshops.

Wasps Studios was established in Dundee, Scotland in 1977 by local artists Bob McGilvray and Grant Clifford. At this time, Wasps was officially registered as a business to operate in Edinburgh, Aberdeen, Dundee and Glasgow to manage owned or leased artist facility real estate.

The ensuing decades have firmly established Wasps Studios as a major arts space provider for artists and cultural organizations in Scotland, with the organization owning or leasing properties across the country. However, the organization has been forced to restructure to meet economical challenges over the years.

== Wasps organizational structure ==
Wasps comprises the following businesses:

- Workshop and Artists Studio Provision (Scotland) Limited (SC062117), incorporated in 1977, to conduct property ownership and management duties of their acquired art facilities. Arts programming, exhibitions, events, and artist residencies are also offered by Wasps Ltd., funded by external resource development and Wasps Creative Industries C.I.C. Wasps Ltd. owns studio property in Skye, Scotland.
- WASPS Creative Industries C.I.C. (Community Interest Company) (SC383609), was incorporated in 2010. It is a subsidiary of Wasps Ltd. that conducts property development duties through which enough profit is generated to contribute financially to Wasps Ltd. programming and activities.

Wasps comprises the following charities:

- Workshop and Artists Studio Provision (Scotland) Limited (SC001351) was established in 1979 to offer educational programming in arts and heritage.
- The WASPS Trust (SC022115) was established in 1993 to hold the property assets of the organization and is the main conduit for its capital projects. Wasps Trust owns studio property in Newburgh, Kirkcudbright, Irvine, Aberdeen, Edinburgh, and Glasgow, and holds long lease agreements for Glasgow's South Block and The Briggait properties.

== Current spaces and recent developments ==
Wasps Managed Spaces (as of 2025)
| Location | Building Name |
|---|---|
| Aberdeen | Langstane Place |
| Dundee | Meadow Mill Studios |
| Edinburgh | Granton Station Creative Works |
| Edinburgh | Patriothall Studios |
| Edinburgh | Riverside House |
| Glasgow | |
| Glasgow | Hanson Street |
| Glasgow | South Block |
| Glasgow | Briggait Clydeside Market Halls |
| Inverness | Inverness Creative Academy |
| Irvine | The Courtyard |
| Kirkcudbright | Cannonwalls and Claverhouse |
| Nairn | Links Studios |
| Newburgh | The Steeple |
| Orkney | Stromness Studios |
| Perth | Perth Creative Exchange |
| Shetland | The Booth |
| Selkirk | St. Mary's Mill |
| Skye | The Admiral's House |

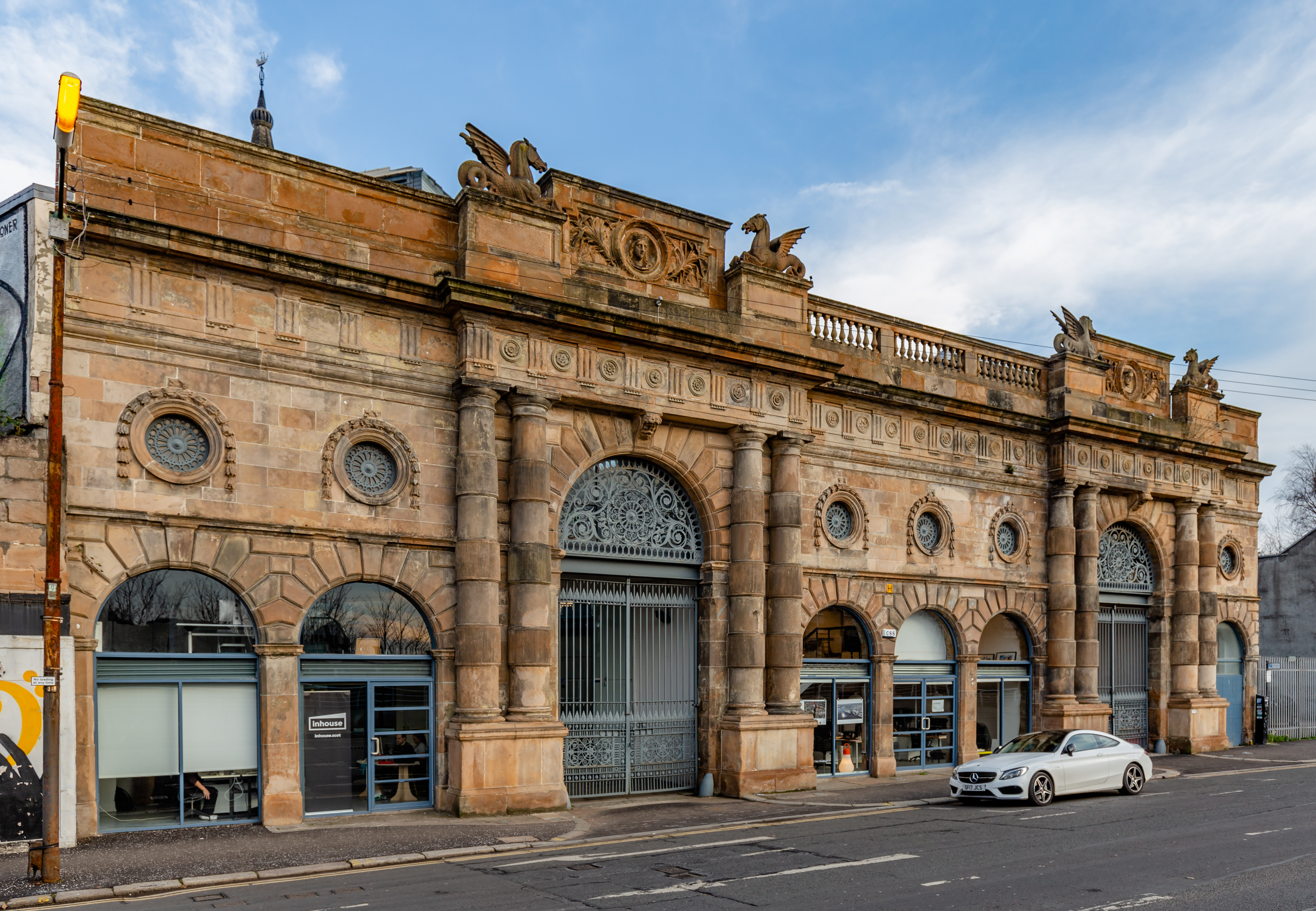
The Briggait, Glasgow

=== Briggait Clydeside Market Halls ===
Originally built in 1873 as Glasgow's fish market, the Briggait was re-opened by Wasps in 2010 after a £6.5 million renovation to provide affordable studio space to over 150 artists. In summer 2024, Wasps completed a £4 million expansion into Clydeside Market Hall to include 1,200 sq. m of market, event, and exhibition space.

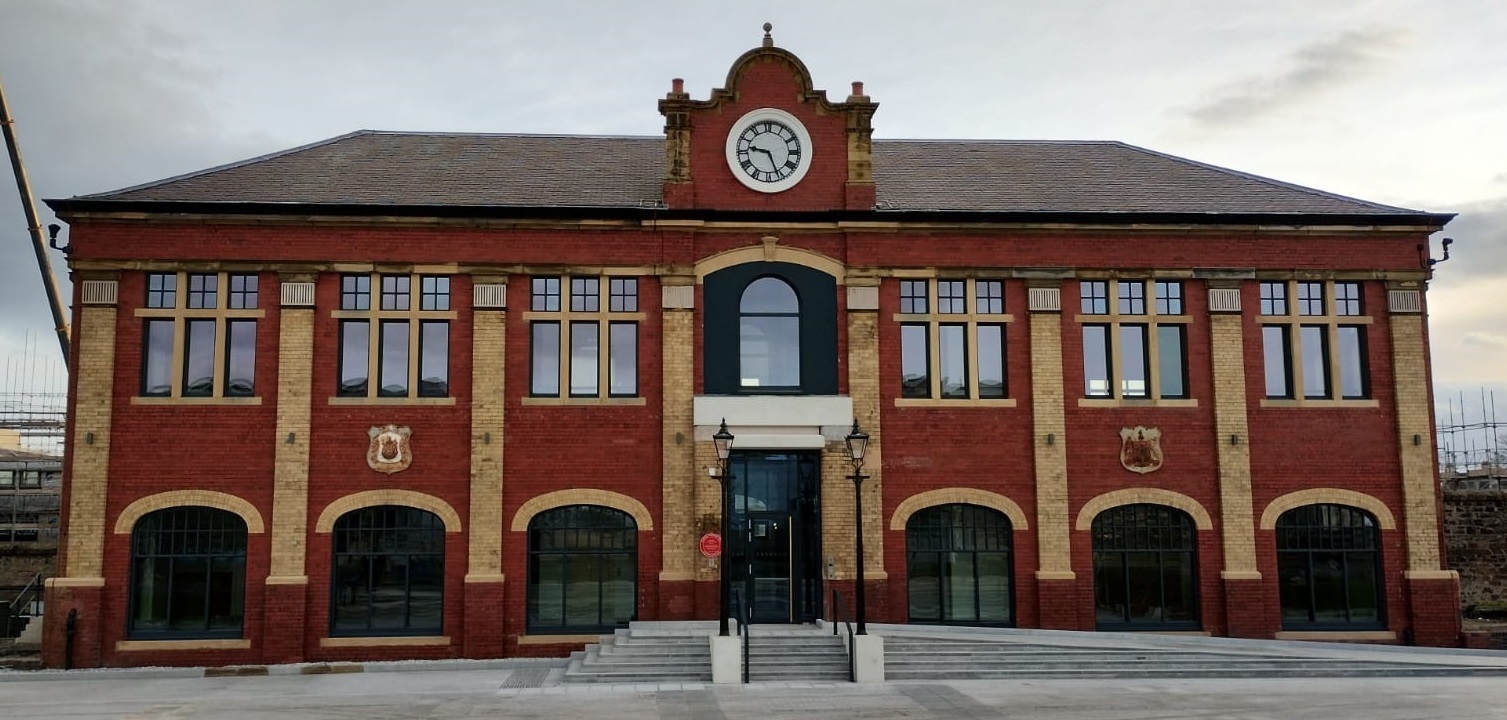
Granton Station, Edinburgh

=== Granton Station ===
Owned by the City of Edinburgh Council and managed by Wasps, Granton Station Creative Works was re-opened in 2023 after a £4.75 million renovation. The former railway station now provides office and co-working space to artists and creative organizations.

=== Inverness Creative Academy ===
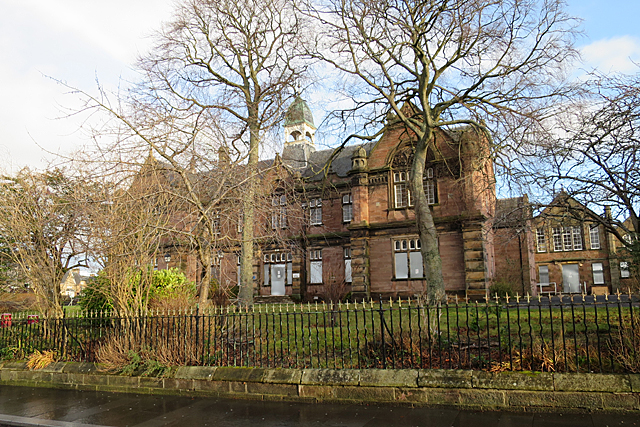
Inverness Creative Academy, Inverness

Wasps converted the former Inverness Royal Academy buildings at Midmills into the Inverness Creative Academy in two phases, with the first phase opening in 2018 and the completed complex opening in 2022. The complex provides artist studios, creative workspaces, meeting and co-working facilities, workshops, exhibition and events space, and a café. In 2022, LDN Architects won the Highlands and Islands Architectural Association award in the New Life for Existing Buildings category for the project.

=== Riverside House ===
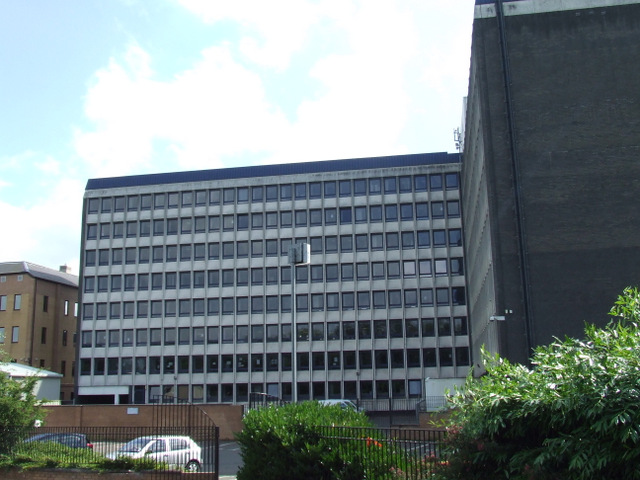
Riverside House, Edinburgh

After determining that the maintenance costs for Wasps' West Park Place studios were unsustainable, and that the building was no longer practical for artists to use safely, Wasps acquired Riverside House as a replacement for West Park Place. The renovation of Riverside House was completed in November 2024.

=== South Block ===
In 2011, South Block was projected to generate more than £69 million in community impact.

== Community impact ==
In 2023-2024, Wasps Studios had 21 buildings, supported 330 artists in their Arts Enterprise Programme, had 815 artist tenants, and had 2 capital projects.

Notably, in 2011, Wasps Studios took over the South Block building in Glasgow, focusing on revitalizing the surrounding community and uplifting artists through "jobs, income, and investment." For instance, according to Scottish Enterprise, Wasps Studios lowered rent for artists for 96 of the available workspaces, and the close environment created in Wasps Studios' properties is intended to foster collaboration – promoting artistic output. The building will also act as an arts hub, increasing economic activity through opening office spaces for other arts-related businesses and becoming a central spot for art buyers. In total, the project is set to "generate £69 million for the economy over the next 20 years" and the site is intended to become fully self-sufficient.

Wasps Studios also has smaller-scale projects, like The Steeple, Newburgh, Fife, which focus on rural communities. These locations are popular among visiting artists who want a change of scenery paired with their short lease opportunities. According to the National Federation of Artists' Studios Providers, arts opportunities in smaller communities help increase economic impact and are also important for creating lasting influence on artists' careers, as they found that there was a trend in those who participated in the program moved to Scotland afterward to continue their practice and contribute to their community.

More recently, in 2024 Wasps Studios completed their renovation of the Briggait Clydesdale Market Halls. The organization planned to partner with food and drink vendors to create a market area while also inviting arts residents to live and work. Similar to many of their other properties, the Briggait Clydesdale Market Halls are set to create impact through renovating heritage buildings that are staples in their community, building and repurposing them for public use to connect the creative communities of Glasgow in a central hub.

In addition to their buildings, the organization also has a variety of arts programming available, such as markets, exhibitions, open studios, and workshops, which aid in increasing arts literacy, skills, and engagement in Scotland.

== Controversy ==
In 2023, a small protest broke out in Scotland among the arts communities under the name Save Our Studios (SOS). The protests regarded Wasps' treatment of their properties, rent, and residents. Karen Anderson (Chair of Wasps Studios), notes that the costs are associated with post-COVID cost-of-living crisis, inflation, and lack of government support, which has caused a "cultural recession" in Scotland that Wasps has been impacted by, but small group of tenants feel that the organization has been focusing on property expansionist policies, rather than community consultation and maintenance – which they perceive as creating a gap in Wasps' commitment to being charitable.

Another protest occurred in relation to Wasps' West Park Place property. The protest came after Wasps determined that the maintenance costs for Wasps' West Park Place studios were unsustainable, and that the building was no longer practical for artists to use safely. Wasps sold the property to be later turned into student housing by Viridis, a development company. From the sale, Wasps bought the larger Riverside House and converted it into artist studios which are now open. This sale caused backlash, with many noting that the new building will be further away from the current building and rent will increase. People like Cllr Ross McKenzie, criticized the sale for locals getting "priced out of living and working in the area," a common occurrence in Edinburgh.

Wasps Studios has also garnered controversy over their business structure which was to be self-sustaining and not reliant on public funding. The organization has a charity structure of governance with an executive team that includes a CEO and COO. Wasps Studios also owns Wasps Ltd, Wasps Trust, and WASPS Creative Industries C.I.C., which are used to manage and develop their properties and programming. Artists from the SOS movement claim that the organizational structure has affected Wasps' ability to be an artist-centred organization, rather moving to a "corporate entity comprising professionals from commerce who have scant awareness of artists' temperaments and the unique challenges of making art." Karen Anderson responded, admitting that there can be better communication between artists and the Wasps, but denied that the organization has poor governance structure that is moving them away from their artist-centred aims.
