= William Stewart MacGeorge =

Scottish artist (1861–1931)

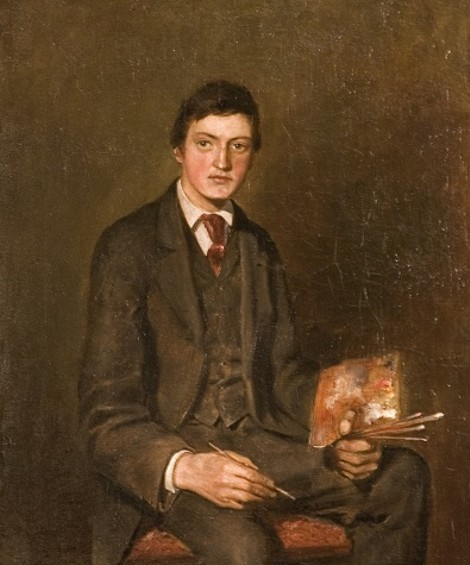
Portrait of MacGeorge by Edward Atkinson Hornel

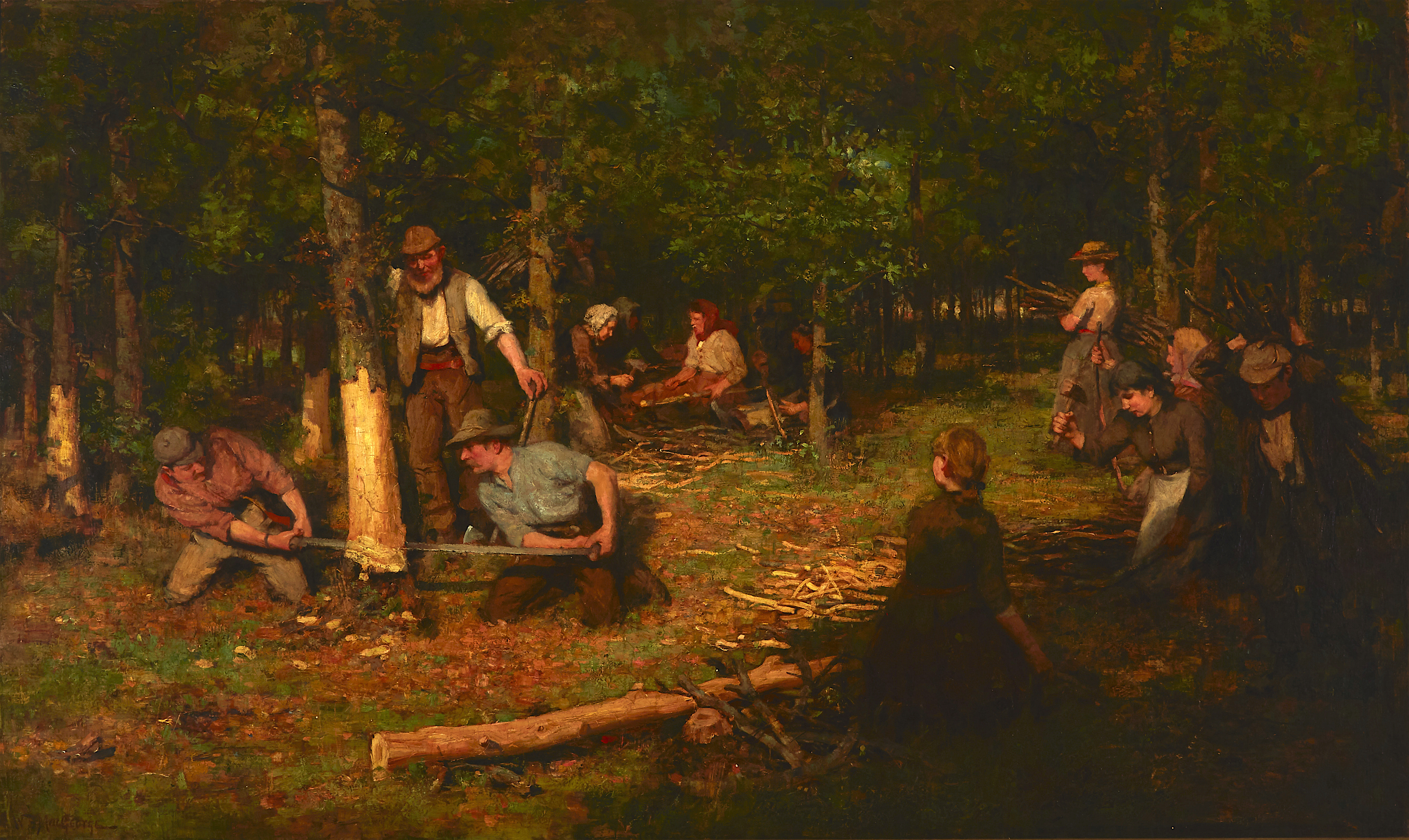
'Bark Peeling' by W S MacGeorge, exhibited Royal Scottish Academy 1889

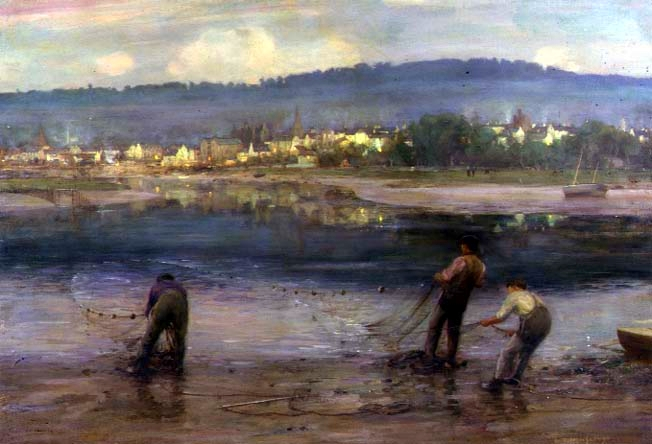
Kirkcudbright by McGeorge

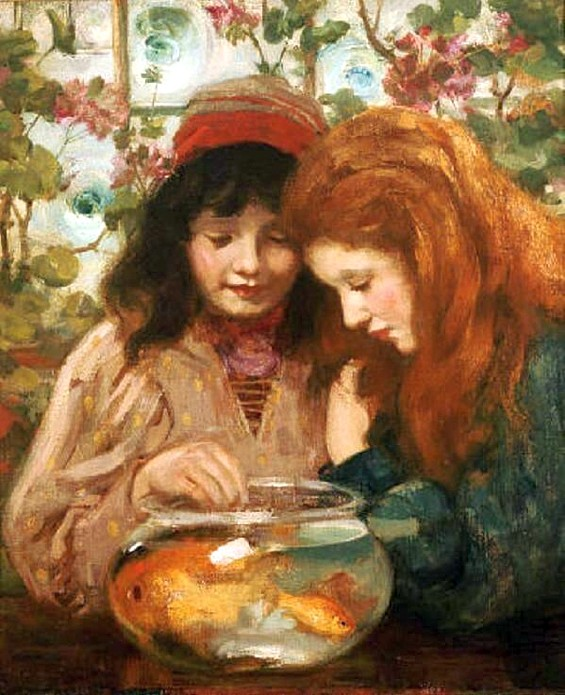
The Goldfish Bowl by William Stewart MacGeorge

William Stewart MacGeorge (1 April 1861 – 9 November 1931) was a Scottish artist associated with the Kirkcudbright School.

Born in Castle Douglas, he lived at 120 King Street. He attended the Royal Institution Art School in Edinburgh before studying under Charles Verlat in Antwerp. After becoming influenced by Edward Atkinson Hornel, who had also studied under Verlat, MacGeorge began using brighter colours. William Stewart MacGeorge later married the widow of Hugh Munro and settling in Gifford, East Lothian where he died. His widow bequeathed about 45 of his paintings to Haddington Town Council. He is fictionalised in the 1907 novel Little Esson, by his boyhood friend S. R. Crockett
