= E. A. Taylor =

Scottish artist (1874–1951)

Ernest Archibald Taylor
- Born: 5 September 1871; Greenock, Scotland
- Died: 20 November 1951 (aged 61); Kirkcudbright, Scotland

Ernest Archibald Taylor (5 September 1874 – 20 November 1951), better known as E A Taylor, was a Scottish artist, an oil painter, watercolourist and etcher, and a designer of furniture, interiors and stained glass.

== Life ==
The Leaning Tree

Taylor was born in Greenock, Scotland, in 1874, the fifteenth of seventeen children of an army major. Initially apprenticed in the Glasgow shipbuilding industry on the River Clyde, he trained as an artist at the Glasgow School of Art, where he met and married Jessie M. King in 1908. They moved to Salford, where he designed for George Wragge Ltd, producing many designs for stained-glass windows, including domestic work for the Scottish engineer Sir William Arrol at Seafield House in Ayr. Between 1911 and 1914 the Taylors lived in Paris where they established an art school – the Shearling Atelier. The influence of modern French art and the Ballets Russes can be seen in Taylor's art: his style broadened and he began to make more use of dramatic outlines.

On their return to Scotland at the outbreak of the First World War, Taylor and King settled at The Greengate in the High Street in Kirkcudbright, where S J Peploe was a frequent visitor. They established a summer school at High Corrie on the Isle of Arran, as well as locally in Kirkcudbright. Taylor's work, like that of his wife, became more powerful and dramatic during their time in Galloway, closer in style to the Scottish Colourists.

A number of Taylor's paintings are in public collections, including Glasgow Museums.

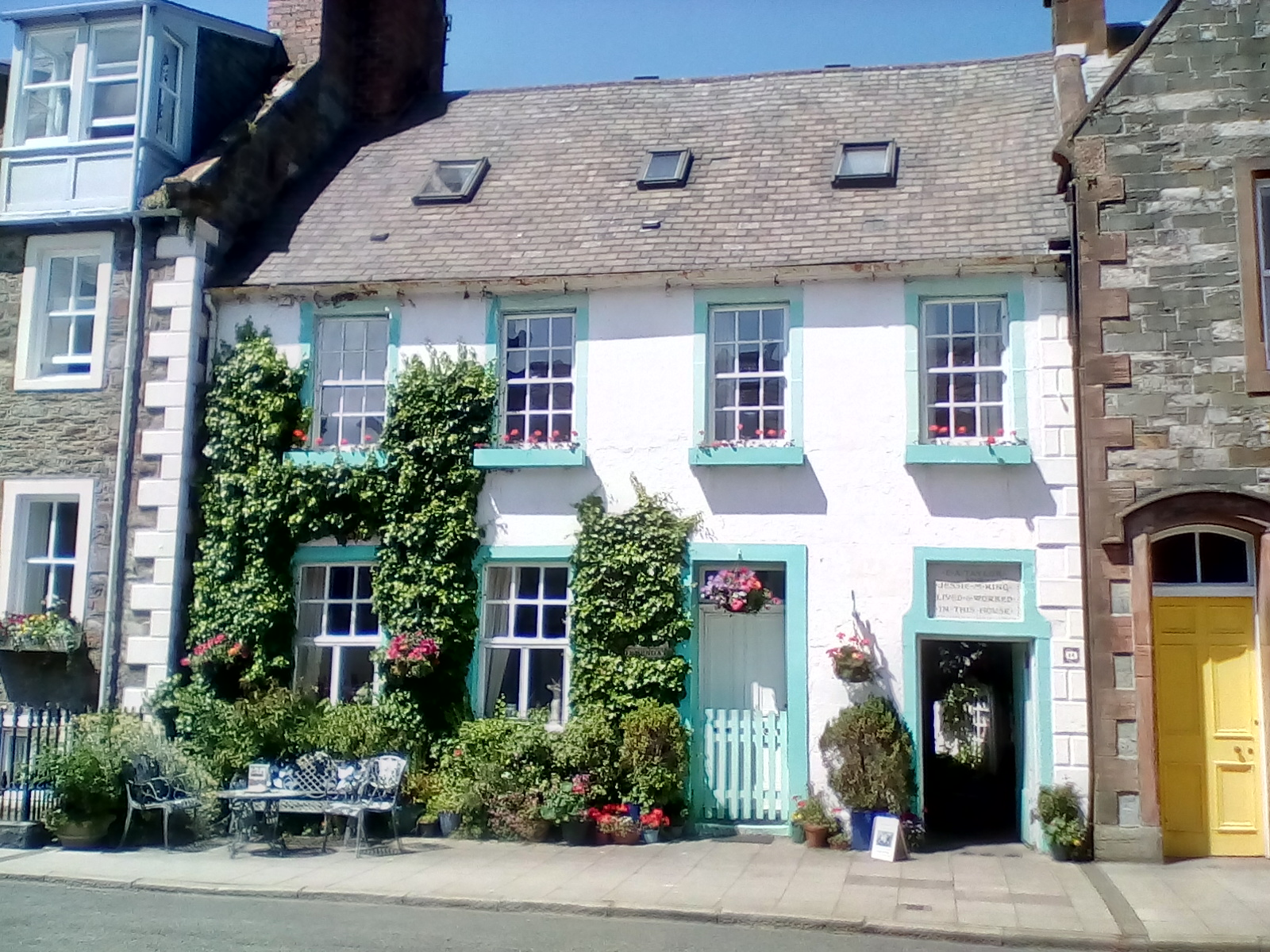
The Greengate, High Street

== Style ==
His early watercolours are delicate and original in design. His watercolour work from around 1900–10 invoked a successful balance between Naturalism (arts) and stylisation. During these years he often painted on Arran, whilst working for the Glasgow cabinetmakers Wylie and Lochhead.

His oils, painted in broad brushstrokes, depict the rugged landscape of the Western Highlands, often with a white croft set against a dark rock face.

== See also ==
- Kirkcudbright Artists' Colony
