= Jessie M. King =

Scottish illustrator (1875–1949)

Jessie Marion King
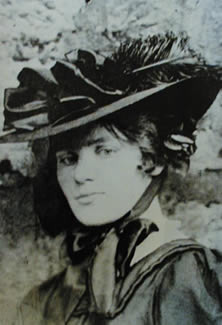
- Born: Jessie Marion King; 20 March 1875; Bearsden, Scotland
- Died: 3 August 1949 (aged 74); Kirkcudbright, Scotland
- Education: Glasgow School of Art
- Known for: Illustration, Design
- Movement: Art Nouveau, Glasgow Style, Symbolism
- Spouse: E. A. Taylor

Jessie Marion King (20 March 1875 – 3 August 1949) was a Scottish illustrator known for her illustrated children's books. She also designed bookplates, jewellery and fabric, and painted pottery. King was one of the artists known as the Glasgow Girls. She was described in 1927 in the Aberdeen Press and Journal as "the pioneer of batik in Great Britain".

== Early life and education ==
King was born at the manse, New Kilpatrick, in Bearsden, Dunbartonshire, near Glasgow. Her father was James Wat(t)ers King, a minister with the Church of Scotland, and her mother was Mary Anne Anderson. She received a strict religious education and was discouraged from becoming an artist. When King was very young, she would hide drawings she made in school for fear that her mother would tear them up. Mary McNab, the family housekeeper, was a formative influence, and was regarded by King as her second mother. King had a spiritual experience in Argyll as a teenager when she fell asleep on a hillside and felt the touch of fairies, in whose existence she continued to believe.

Jessie M. King began training as an art teacher in 1891 at Queen Margaret College (Glasgow). In 1892 she entered the Glasgow School of Art. As a student, she received a number of awards, including her first silver medal from the National Competition, South Kensington (1898).

== Career and work ==
Illustration by Jessie M. King from the Christmas supplement to The Studio, issued 15 December 1913

King was made Tutor in Book Decoration and Design at Glasgow School of Art in 1899. She continued to teach until her marriage to E. A. Taylor in 1908, and she chose, against the grain, to keep her maiden name.

King was influenced by the Art Nouveau of the period, and her works correspond in mood with those of The Glasgow Four. Despite the influence of Art Nouveau, she was inspired to create unique designs where she did not literally translate the real world. "I would not copy designs," she said, "but insisted on drawing out of my head." During her early period, she created detailed pen and ink illustrations on vellum.

Most of King's earliest works involved illustration, but she also wrote books and was a skilled jewellery designer. Her first published designs, and some people believe her finest, were for the covers of books published by Globus Verlag, Berlin, between 1899 and 1902. The publisher was a subsidiary company of the great Berlin department store, Wertheim's. The publisher, Georg Wertheim, wanted her to design "a range of items in the 'new Scottish Style.'" In the years 1907–1924 she illustrated more than 20 books published by Edinburgh firm T. N. Foulis. In all she illustrated, wrote, decorated or designed the cover of more than 100 books and other publications.

She made a grand tour of Germany and Italy in 1902 and was influenced by the works of Botticelli. In the same year her binding for "L'Evangile de L'Enfance" was awarded a gold medal in the International Exhibition of Modern Decorative Art, held in Turin. The accompanying certificate was made out to "Signor Jessie Marion King" because there was no provision for a prize to be won by a "Signora". King became a committee member of the Glasgow Society of Artists (1903) and a member of the Glasgow Society of Lady Artists (1905). Her contribution to Art Nouveau peaked during her first exhibitions, Annan's Gallery in Glasgow (1907) and Bruton Street Galleries, London (1905). She designed pewter, silver and jewellery for Liberty's from about 1905.

In 1908 King and her husband moved to Salford where their only child, a daughter, Merle Elspeth (1909–1985), was born in 1909; Mary McNab joined the household, which enabled King to continue working. The couple honeymooned on the Isle of Arran where they would later rent out cottages in High Corrie to run a summer school of painting and sketching. King visited Culross, a forgotten village in Fife, and collected black and white drawings of its buildings in Dwellings of an Old World Town, published by Gowans & Gray (1909).

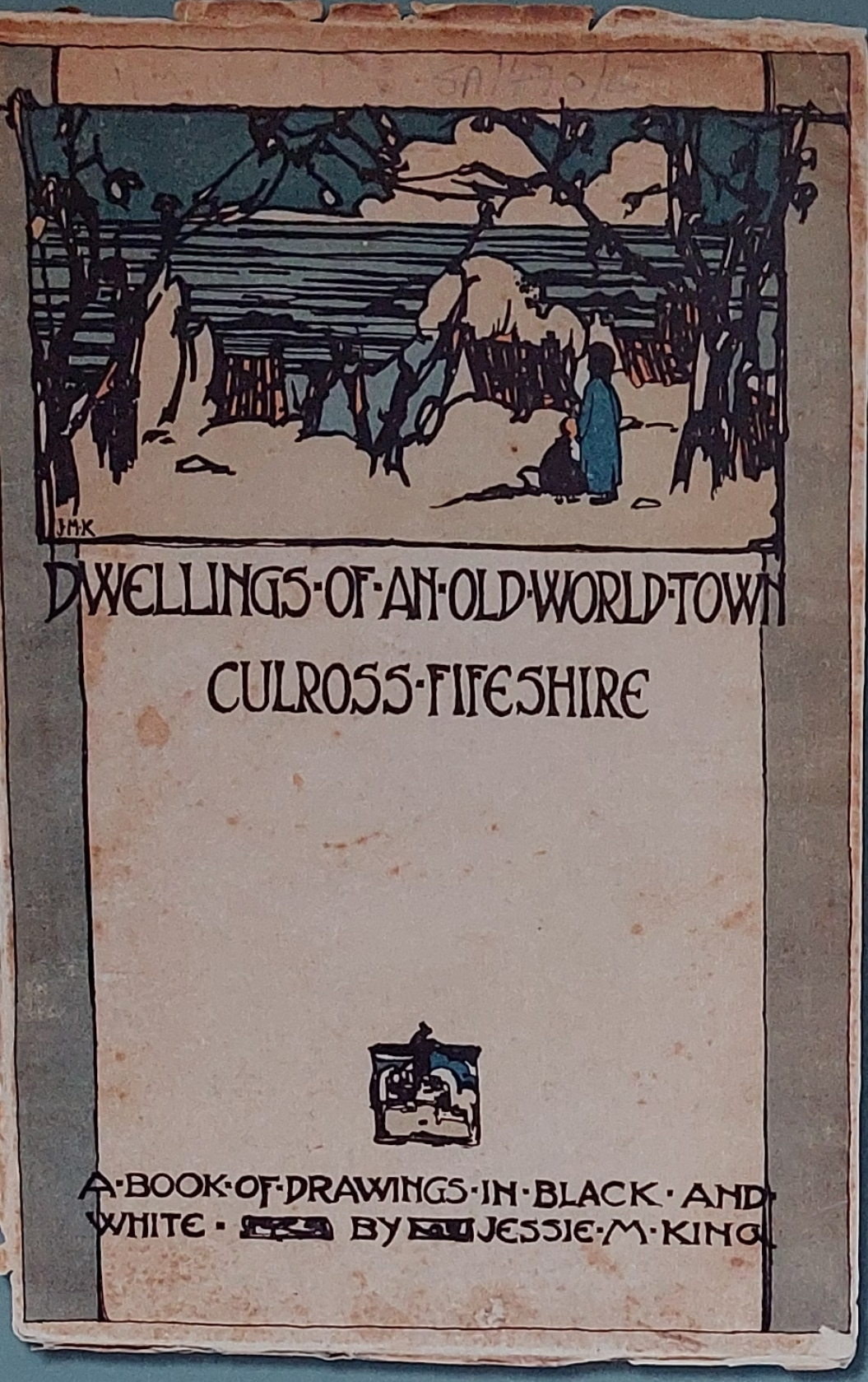
Cover of a book of drawings by Jessie M. King, titled Dwellings of an Old World Town, Culross Fifeshire (1909).

In 1910 they moved on to Paris where Taylor had gained a professorship at Ernest Percyval Tudor-Hart's Studios. In 1911 King and Taylor opened the Sheiling Atelier School in Paris. During this period King encountered the new colours introduced by Léon Bakst in his costume and set designs for Diaghilev's Ballets Russes and her works in Paris are considered influential in the creation of the Art Deco movement.

King also decorated ceramics and worked with batik, which she is credited with introducing to Liberty's. In 1924 she published How Cinderella Was Able to Go to the Ball, "A Brochure on Batik written and illustrated by Jessie M. King."

== Later life and death ==
King and Taylor moved to Kirkcudbright in 1915 and continued to work there until her death. King died at home in Kirkcudbright on 3 August 1949, following a heart attack. She was cremated at Kirkcudbright and her ashes were scattered at Minard, Argyll, at the church where Mary McNab was buried.

== Gallery ==
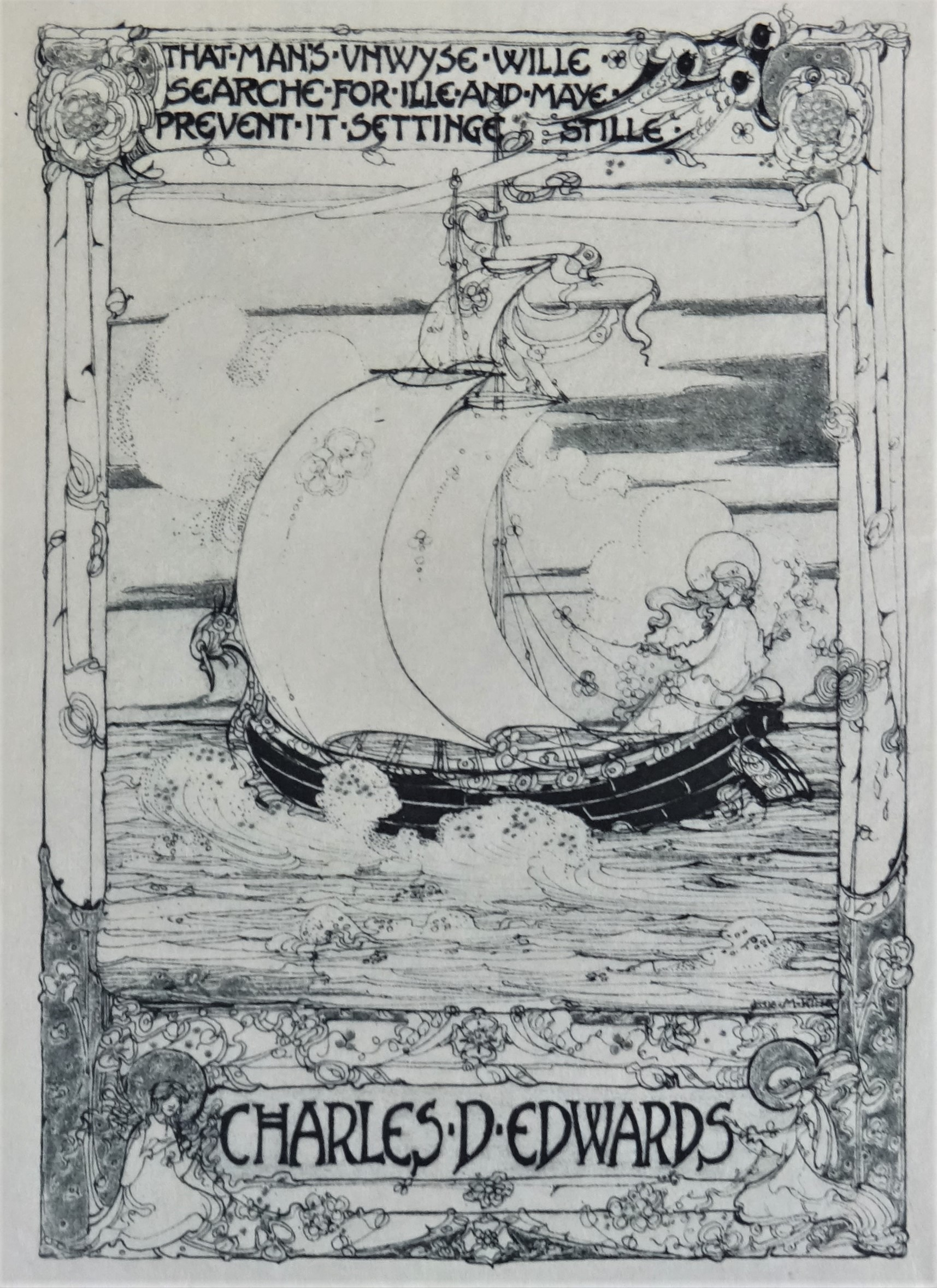
A 1907 Jessie M. King bookplate for Charles D. Edwards on Japanese vellum.

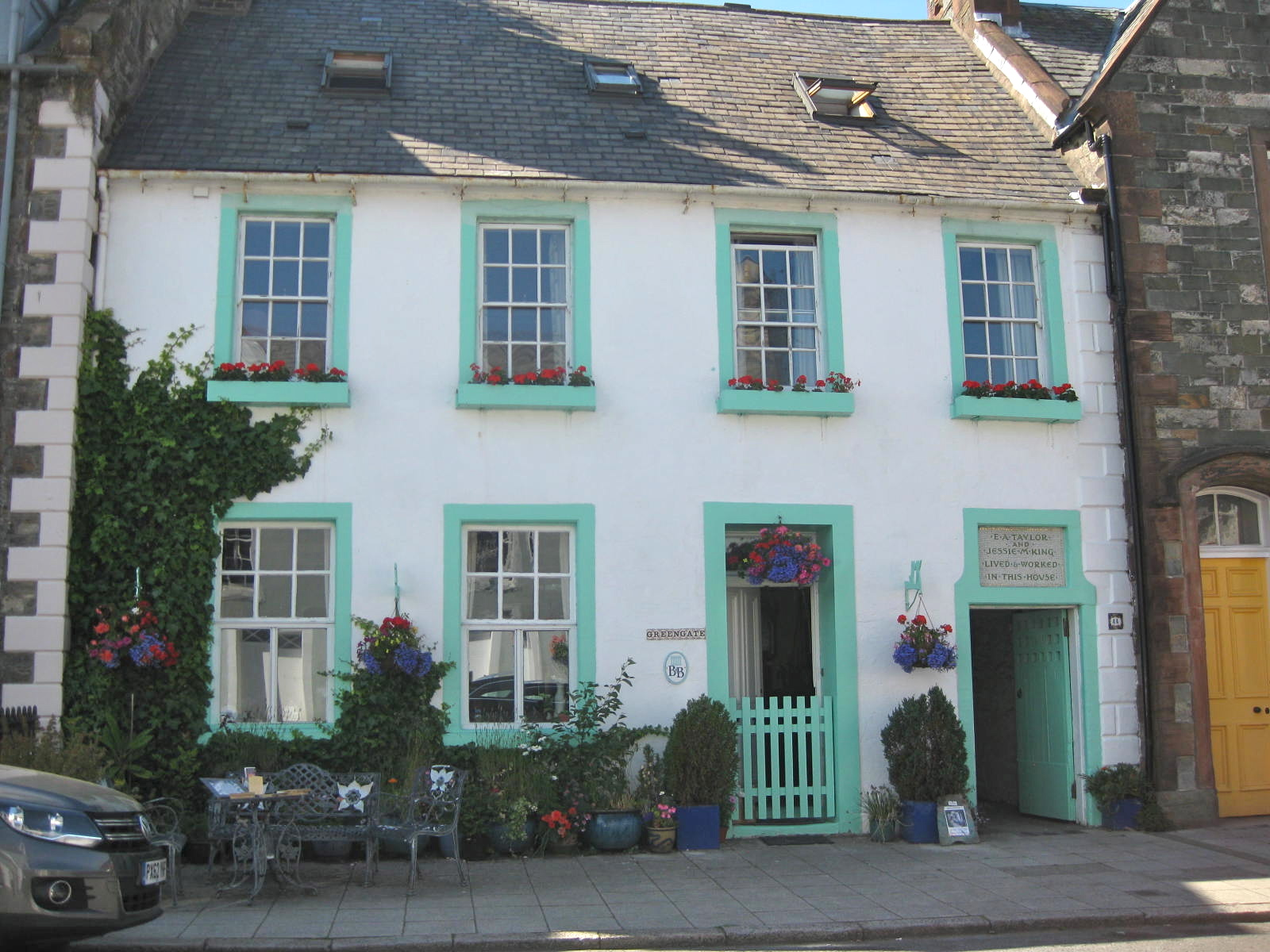
Jessie Marion King's House, High Street, Kirkcudbright.

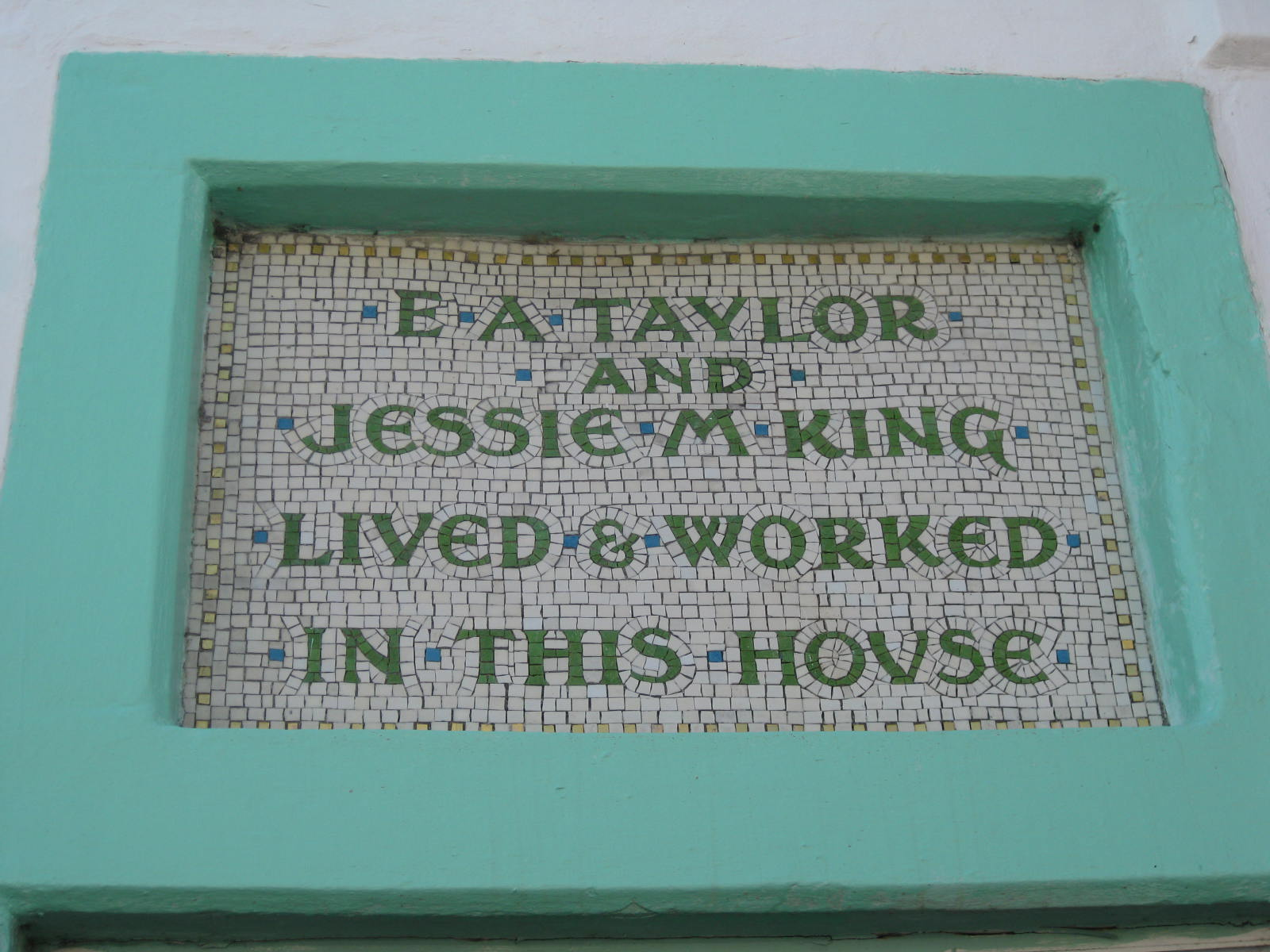
Inscription over side door.

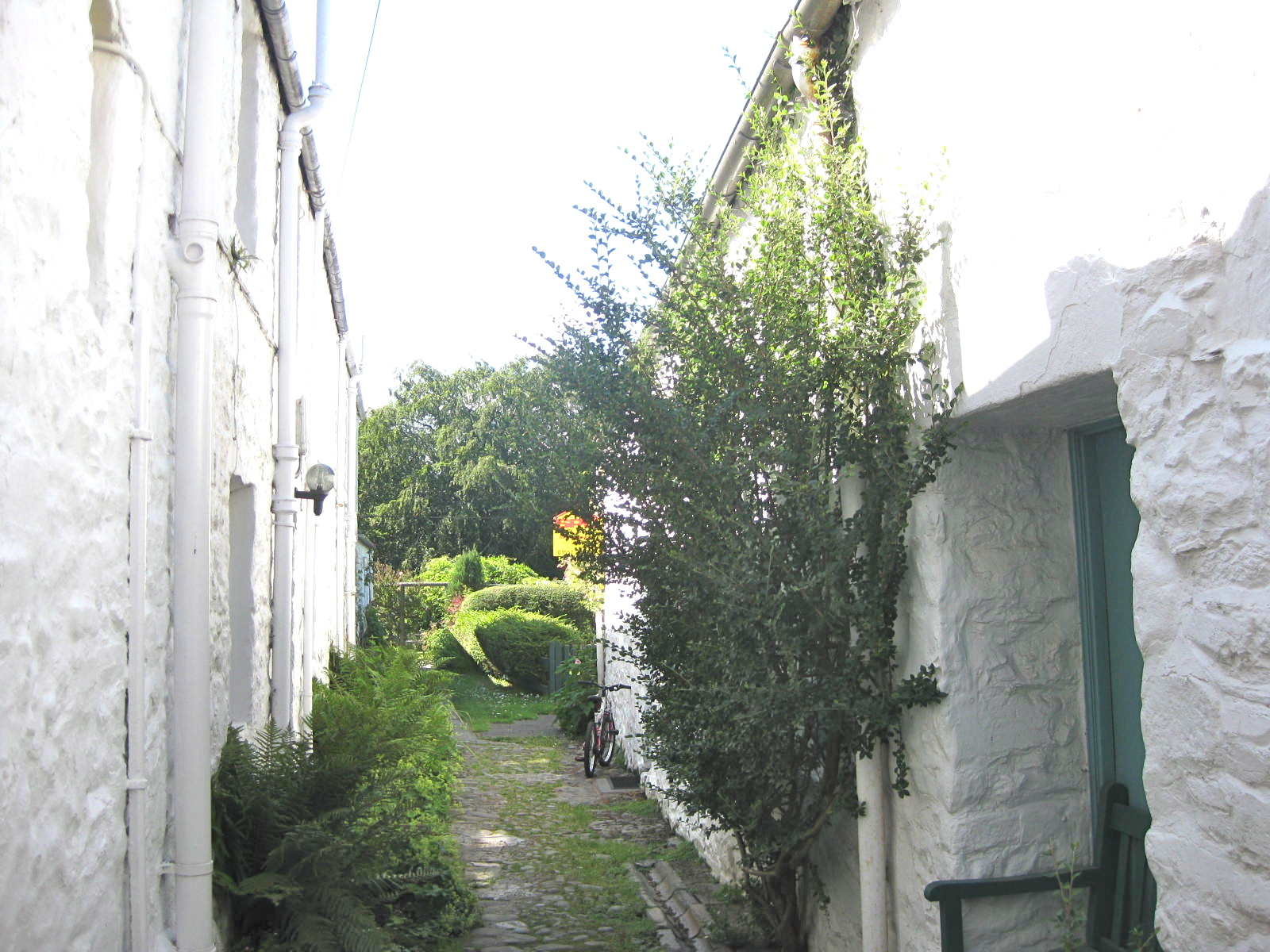
Artists' cottages reached by side passage.

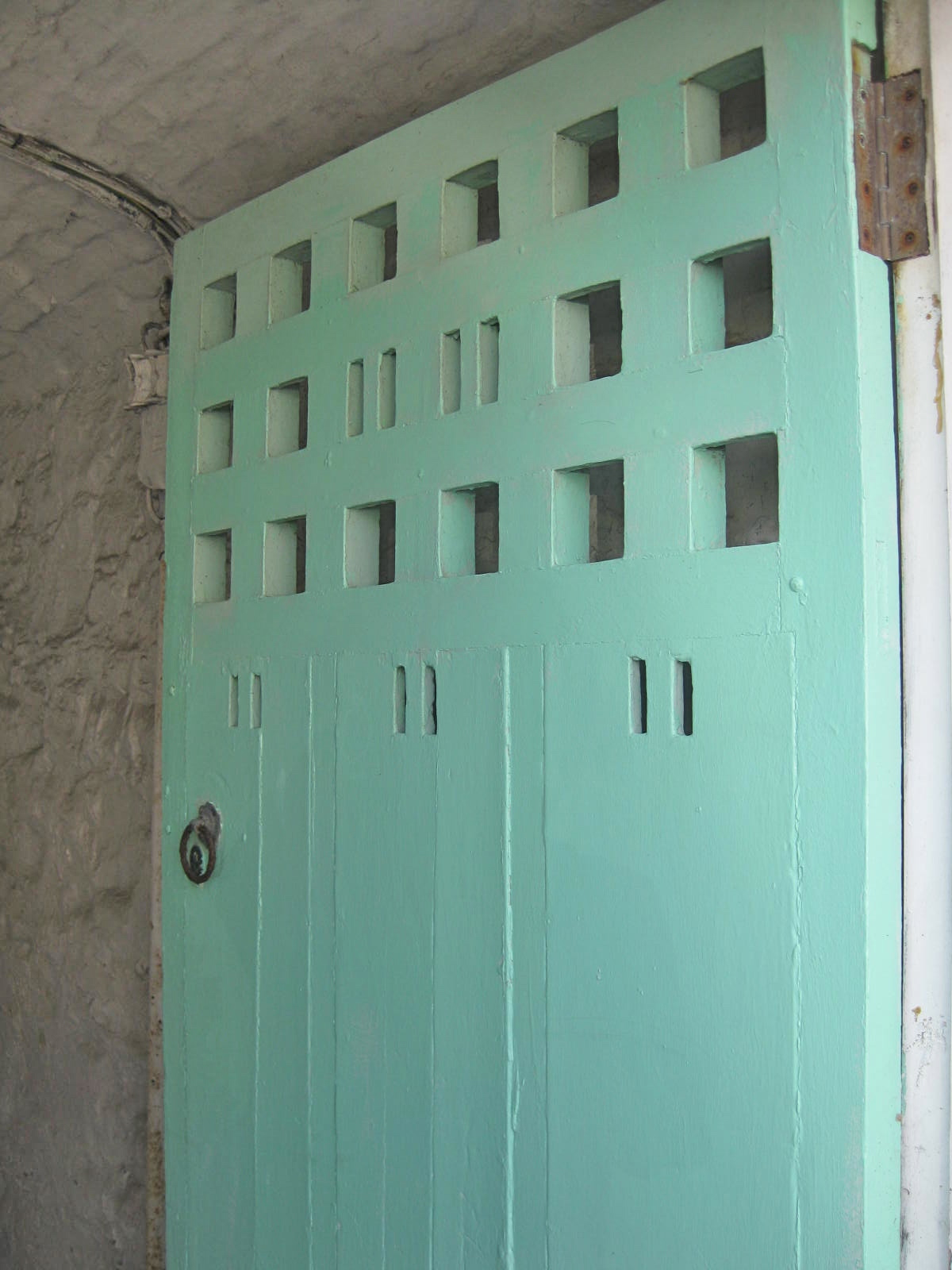
Art Nouveau design to doorway.
