= List of public art in Dorset =

This is a list of public art in Dorset, in England. This list applies only to works of public art accessible in an outdoor public space. For example, this does not include artwork visible inside a museum.

== Bournemouth ==
Image	Title / subject	Location and coordinates	Date	Artist / designer	Type	Material	Dimensions	Designation	Notes
	Bournemouth - A History of Shaping the Future	Lansdowne Road 50.723246°N 1.867461°W	February 2016	Rick Walker	Mural		15 metres (49 ft) × 13 metres (43 ft)		
	A Life Lost to AIDS in Dorset	Pier Approach 50.716817°N 1.876021°W				Tiles			Tile designs created by students of Secondary Schools in Bournemouth and Poole during HIV/AIDS awareness workshops run by DAMSET (Dorset AIDS Memorial Schools Educational Trust).
More images	Statue of Lewis Tregonwell and Christopher Crabb Creeke	Exeter Road 50.716819°N 1.877876°W	1999	Jonathan Sells	Statue	Stone	3' x 2'6" x 7'6"		Depicts founder of Bournemouth Lewis Tregonwell (standing, holding a bucket and spade) and architect/surveyor Christopher Crabb Creeke (seated on a lavatory in reference to his post of Inspector of Nuisances). Tregonwell also holds the names of three Victoria Cross recipients from Bournemouth.
	Mosaic	Exeter Road 50.7191°N 1.8803°W	1996	After Aubrey Beardsley	Mural	Mosaic tile			Mosaic based on a design by Aubrey Beardsley, who lived in a house "Muriel" which previously stood here.
More images	Blue Skies Jon Egging memorial	East Cliff 50.7180°N 1.8666°W	2012	Tim Ward		Glass, stainless steel	5 metres (16 ft)		Memorial to Red Arrows pilot Jon Egging, killed in a crash following a display at Bournemouth Air Festival. The memorial was moved to its current location in 2017 following a landslip.

== Bovington ==
Image	Title / subject	Location and coordinates	Date	Artist / designer	Type	Material	Dimensions	Designation	Notes
	Royal Tank Regiment Memorial (replica)	Bovington Tank Museum 50.6949°N 2.2424°W		Vivien Mallock after George Henry Paulin		Resin			Resin cast of the Royal Tank Regiment Memorial in Whitehall, London.

== Christchurch ==
Image	Title / subject	Location and coordinates	Date	Artist / designer	Type	Material	Dimensions	Designation	Notes
More images	Christchurch Priory Commemorative Sculpture	Christchurch Priory 50.7313°N 1.7737°W	1994	Jonathan Sells	Sculpture	Stone			Sculpture commemorating Ranulf Flambard, who began building the priory in 1094.

== Dorchester ==
Image	Title / subject	Location and coordinates	Date	Artist / designer	Type	Material	Dimensions	Designation	Notes
More images	Sylvia Townsend Warner	Gould's department store in South Street, Dorchester	1994	Denise Dutton	Sculpture	Bronze	lifesize		Sculpture of Sylvia Townsend Warner

== Lyme Regis ==
Image	Title / subject	Location and coordinates	Date	Artist / designer	Type	Material	Dimensions	Designation	Notes
More images	Statue of Mary Anning	Black Ven 50.725256°N 2.930395°W	May 2022	Denise Dutton	Statue	Bronze			Statue of paleontologist Mary Anning. Crowdfunded by a campaign "Mary Anning Rocks", started by Dorset schoolgirl Evie Swire.

== Poole ==
Image	Title / subject	Location and coordinates	Date	Artist / designer	Type	Material	Dimensions	Designation	Notes
More images	Statue of Robert Baden-Powell	The Quay 50.71195°N 1.98592°W	2008	David Annand	Statue	Bronze			Depicts Robert Baden-Powell facing Brownsea Island, site of the first Scout camp.

== Weymouth and Osmington ==
Image	Title / subject	Location and coordinates	Date	Artist / designer	Type	Material	Dimensions	Designation	Notes
More images	Osmington White Horse	Osmington Hill, Osmington 50.65741°N 2.40438°W	1808		Hill figure	Chalk		Scheduled monument	The rider is George III.
More images	Statue of Queen Victoria	Outside St John's Church, The Esplanade, Weymouth 50.6187°N 2.4507°W	1902	George Blackall Simonds	Statue on pedestal	Bronze and Portland stone	7 metres (23 ft) tall	Grade II	
More images	Weymouth Cenotaph	The Esplanade, Weymouth 50.6170°N 2.4513°W	1921	Francis William Doyle Jones	Cenotaph	Portland stone	5.3 metres (17 ft) tall	Grade II	

== Other ==
Dorset was once considered for a hill figure of Marilyn Monroe, but the figure was never made.
