= List of public art in Kent =

This is a list of public art in Kent, a county in South East England. This list including statues, busts and other memorials and applies only to works of public art on permanent display in an outdoor public space and as such does not include, for example, artworks in museums.

== Canterbury ==
Image	Title / subject	Location and coordinates	Date	Artist / designer	Type	Material	Dimensions	Designation	Wikidata	Notes
More images	Memorial to Christopher Marlowe	Marlowe Theatre, The Friars, Canterbury	1891	Edward Onslow Ford	Statue on pedestal with 4 statuettes	Bronze and stone		Grade II	Q19354026	
More images	Boer War Memorial	Dane John Gardens, Canterbury	1904	William Douglas Caroe	Obelisk with statue	Stone and bronze			Q94071452	Architect, Nathaniel Hitch
More images	War memorial	Buttermarket, Canterbury	1921	Benjamin Clemens	Pillar with cross & 4 figures in niches	Stone	9m tall	Grade II	Q66477861	Architect, Arthur Beresford Pite
More images	Æthelberht of Kent	Lady Wootton's Green, Canterbury	2004-5	Stephen Melton						
More images	Bertha of Kent	Lady Wootton's Green, Canterbury	2004-5	Stephen Melton						
More images	Geoffrey Chaucer	High Street, Canterbury	2016	Sam Holland & Lynn O'Dowd	Statue on podium	Bronze				

== Chatham ==
Image	Title / subject	Location and coordinates	Date	Artist / designer	Type	Material	Dimensions	Designation	Wikidata	Notes
	General Charles George Gordon	Brompton Barracks, Chatham	1890	Edward Onslow Ford	Camel-mounted statue on pedestal	Bronze and stone		Grade II*		
	Herbert Kitchener, 1st Earl Kitchener	Kitchener Barracks, Chatham	Relocated 1960		Equestrian statue on pedestal	Bronze and stone		Grade II	Q26558560	Originally in Khartoum, relocated to Chatham in 1960.
More images	Chatham Naval Memorial	Chatham	1924	Robert Lorimer	Obelisk with plaques	Portland stone and bronze		Grade I	Q5087681	
More images	Extension to Chatham Naval Memorial	Chatham	1952	William McMillan & Charles Wheeler	Sculpture elements	Portland stone		Grade I	Q5087681	Extension designed by Sir Edward Maufe.

== Dover ==
Image	Title / subject	Location and coordinates	Date	Artist / designer	Type	Material	Dimensions	Designation	Wikidata	Notes
More images	Matthew Webb	Marine Parade, Dover	1910	Francis William Doyle Jones	Bust on pedestal with plaque	Bronze & granite			Q117405781	
More images	Charles Rolls	Marine Parade, Dover	1911	Kathleen Scott	Statue on pedestal	Bronze & stone			Q117378416	
More images	South Eastern and Chatham Railway war memorial	Cruse Terminal 1, former Dover Marine Station	1922	William Charles Holland King	Sculpture group on pedestal with surround	Bronze & granite		Grade II	Q5302507	
More images	War memorial	Garden of Remembrance, Biggin Street, Dover	1924	Richard Reginald Goulden	Statue on pedestal with surround	Bronze & granite		Grade II*	Q26675819	
	The Waiting Miner	Marine Parade, Dover	Resited 1997	H. Phillips	Statue	Bronze				
More images	Admiral Bertram Ramsay	Dover Castle	2000	Stephen Melton	Statue on pedestal with plaques	Bronze & stone				
	Merchant Navy memorial	Marine Parade, Dover		Vivien Mallock	Statue on pedestal	Bronze & granite				
	The Samphire Tower	Samphire Hoe	2001	Jony Easterby	Tower	Oak framed, larch clad. Rolled sheet lead roof.				

== Gillingham ==
Image	Title / subject	Location and coordinates	Date	Artist / designer	Type	Material	Dimensions	Designation	Wikidata	Notes
More images	Gillingham War Memorial	Medway Park, Mill Road, Gillingham, Kent	1924	Francis William Doyle Jones	Inscribed column	Stone		Grade II	Q26677893	

== Gravesend ==
Image	Title / subject	Location and coordinates	Date	Artist / designer	Type	Material	Dimensions	Designation	Wikidata	Notes
More images	General Charles George Gordon	Gordon Gardens, Gravesend		John Broad & Messrs Doulton	Statue on pedestal	Stone and terracotta		Grade II	Q2667047	
	Queen Victoria	Darnley Road, Gravesend	1897–98	John Broad & Messrs Doultons, Lambeth	Statue on pedestal	Stone and terracotta		Grade II		
More images	Queen Victoria	Borough Market House, Gravesend	1898	John Broad	Statue on pedestal	Stone		Grade II		
More images	War memorial	Windmill Hill Gardens, Gravesend	1922	Francis William Doyle Jones	Statue on column	Bronze & stone	9.2m tall	Grade II	Q66477666	
More images	Pocahontas	St George's Church, Gravesend	1958	William Ordway Partridge	Statue on pedestal	Bronze and stone		Grade II	Q26309866	Cast of the original 1922 statue in Jamestown, Virginia.
	Squadron Leader Mohinder Singh Pujji	Elizabeth Gardens, Gravesend	2014	Douglas Jennings	Statue on pedestal	Bronze and stone				
	Elizabeth II	Elizabeth Gardens, Gravesend	2018	Douglas Jennings	Seated statue on pedestal	Bronze and stone				

== Knowlton ==
Image	Title / subject	Location and coordinates	Date	Artist / designer	Type	Material	Dimensions	Designation	Wikidata	Notes
More images	War memorial	Knowlton	1919	George Frampton	Lantern cross with figures	Stone			Q94131948	

== Maidstone ==
Image	Title / subject	Location and coordinates	Date	Artist / designer	Type	Material	Dimensions	Designation	Wikidata	Notes
More images	Queen Victoria Monument	High Street, Maidstone	1862	John Thomas	Statue on pedestal with canopy	Stone and granite		Grade II	Q26376681	
More images	War memorial	Tonbridge Road, Maidstone	1922	George Frampton	Statue on pedestal	Bronze and limestone		Grade II	Q26675478	

== Northfleet ==
Image	Title / subject	Location and coordinates	Date	Artist / designer	Type	Material	Dimensions	Designation	Wikidata	Notes
More images	War memorial	Northfleet Cement Works, Kent	c. 1920	Francis William Doyle Jones	Seated sculpture on cube pedestal with plaque	Concrete & bronze		Grade II	Q26671015	

== Westerham ==
Image	Title / subject	Location and coordinates	Date	Artist / designer	Type	Material	Dimensions	Designation	Wikidata	Notes
More images	Winston Churchill	The Green, Westerham	1921	Oscar Nemon	Seated statue on plinth	Bronze and limestone				
More images	General James Wolfe	The Green, Westerham	1911	Francis Derwent Wood	Statue on pedestal	Bronze and Portland stone		Grade II*	Q17545629	

== Wittersham ==
Image	Title / subject	Location and coordinates	Date	Artist / designer	Type	Material	Dimensions	Designation	Wikidata	Notes
More images	War memorial	Wittersham	1921	George Frampton	Orb on octagonal column	Portland and Wealden stone	5m tall	Grade II	Q26676940	
