= Statue of Mary Anning =

Statue in Lyme Regis, Dorset, England

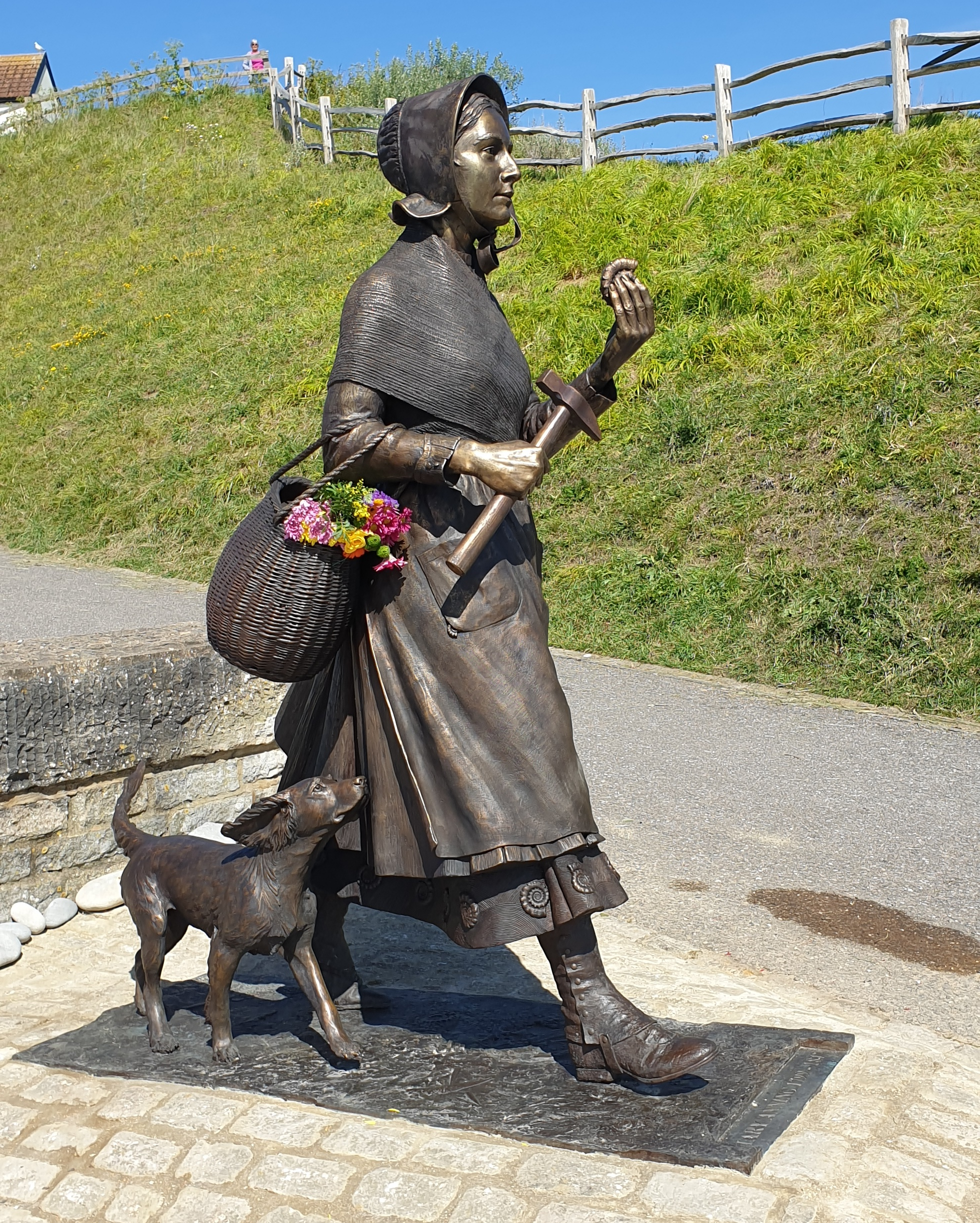
- The statue of Mary Anning
- Artist: Denise Dutton
- Year: 21 May 2022
- Type: Bronze
- Location: Lyme Regis; 50°43′30.9″N 2°55′49.4″W

The Statue of Mary Anning is a bronze sculpture of the paleontologist Mary Anning in Lyme Regis.

== Inception and campaign ==
In August 2018, a campaign called "Mary Anning Rocks" was formed by an 11-year-old school girl from Dorset, Evie Swire, supported by her mother Anya Pearson.

The campaign, in promoting a monument to a 19th-century woman scientist, aimed to highlight the bias in the number of UK statues of men rather than women (more than 85% men). Prior to the erection of Mary's statue in May 2022, there were three other statues to a woman in the Southwest of England; the 2019 statue of Nancy Astor in Plymouth, the 1888 Statue of Queen Victoria in Bristol, and the 1902 Statue of Queen Victoria in Weymouth.

Plans for launching the crowdfunding part of the campaign in May 2020 were placed on hold due to the COVID-19 pandemic in England, with the Mary Anning Rocks group selling t-shirts instead. In November 2020 the delayed public crowdfunding campaign was launched to raise the money to commission a statue of Mary Anning for her home town of Lyme Regis.

Patrons and supporters of the campaign include Professor Alice Roberts, Sir David Attenborough, and novelist Tracy Chevalier.

== The statue ==
In January 2021 the campaign had raised over £70,000, enough for the sculpture to be produced by sculptor Denise Dutton. She produced a maquette of the piece, which was publicly displayed at the Marine Theatre in Lyme Regis on 22 May 2021, Anning's 222nd Birthday.

Planning permission for the statue, at a site overlooking Black Ven (where Mary made many of her discoveries), was lodged in November 2021 and granted by Dorset Council in January 2022. The site is at the junction of Long Entry and Gun Cliff Walk in Lyme Regis.

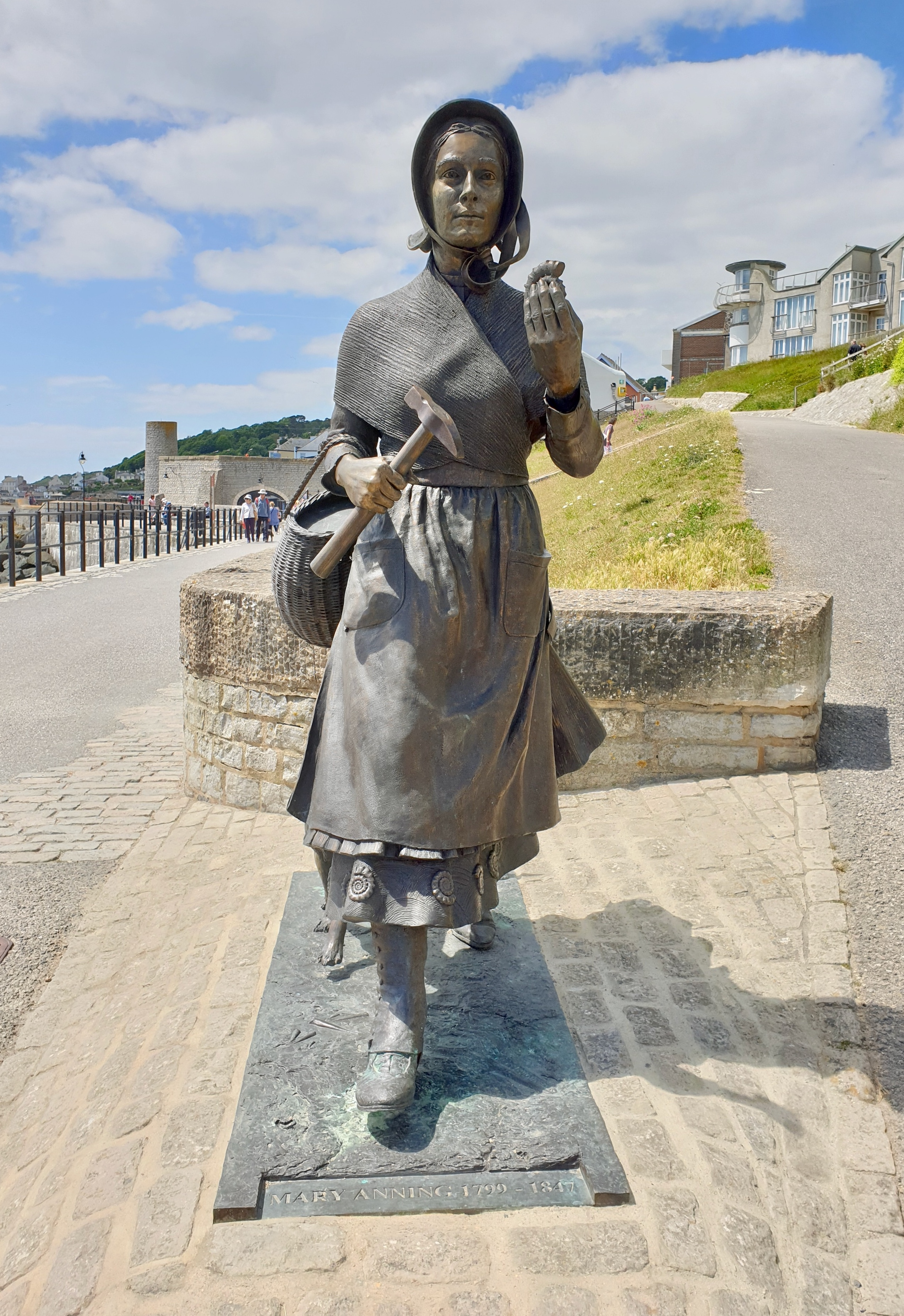
Front view

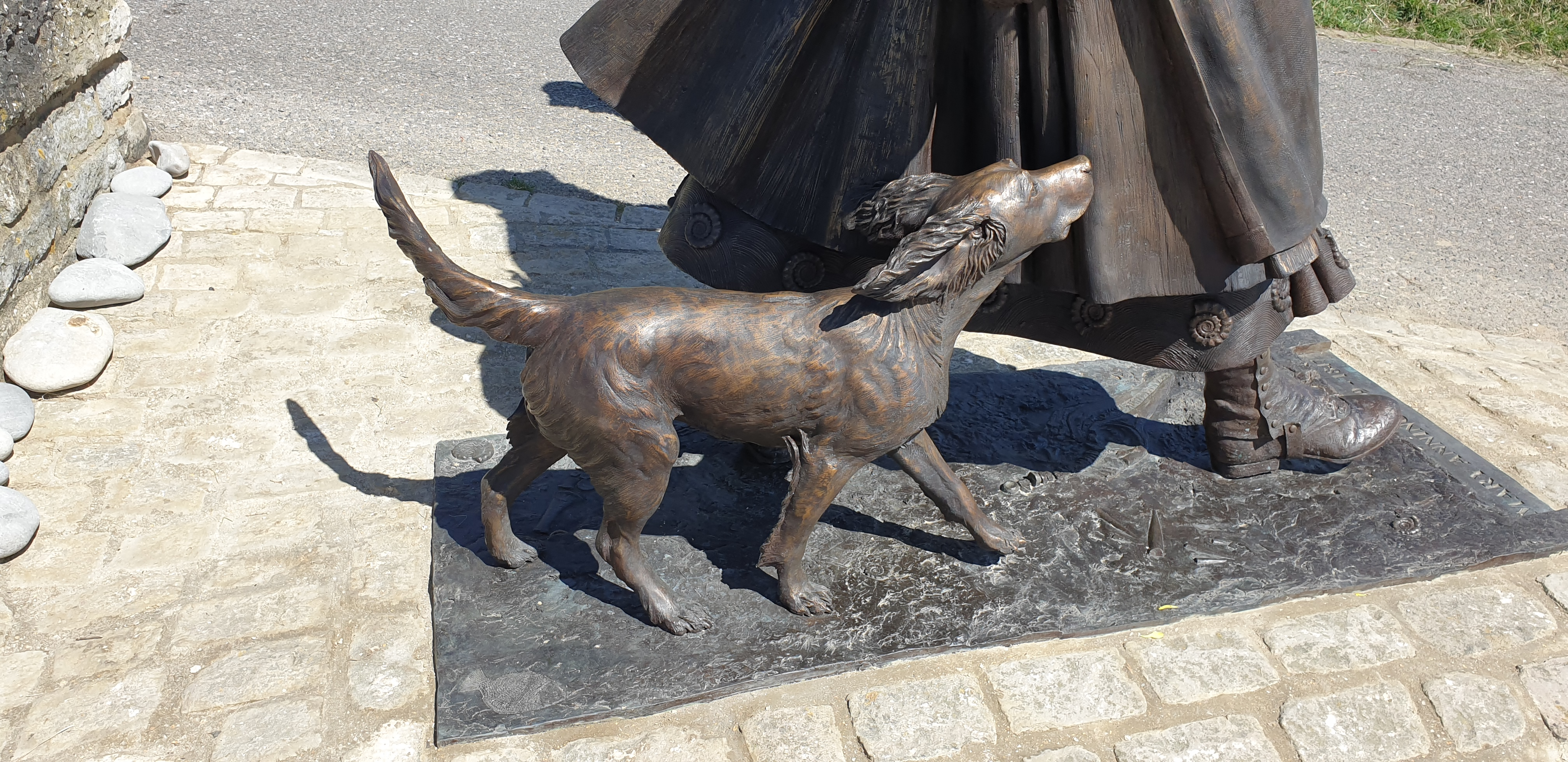
Detail

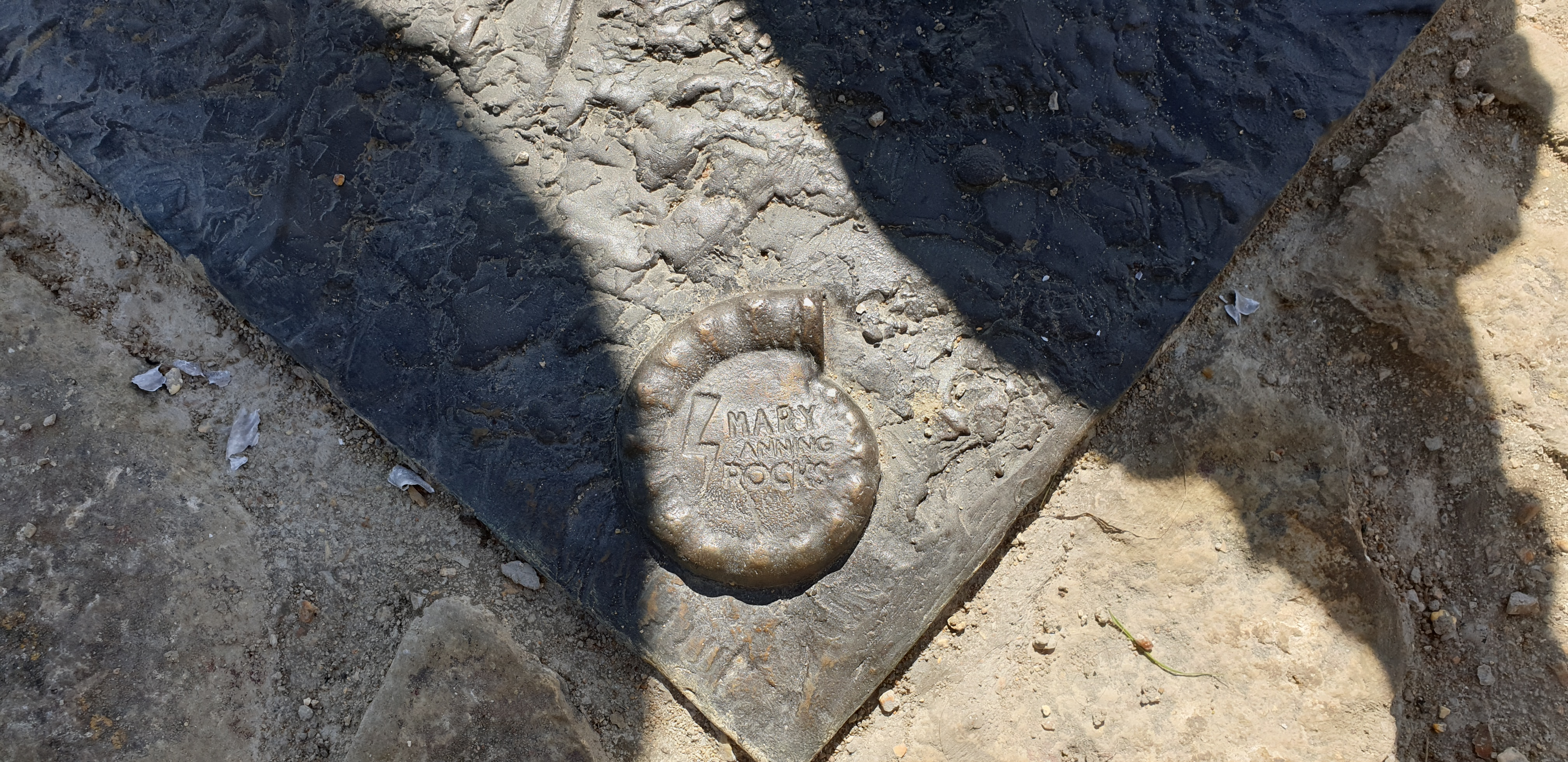
Mary Anning Rocks campaign logo

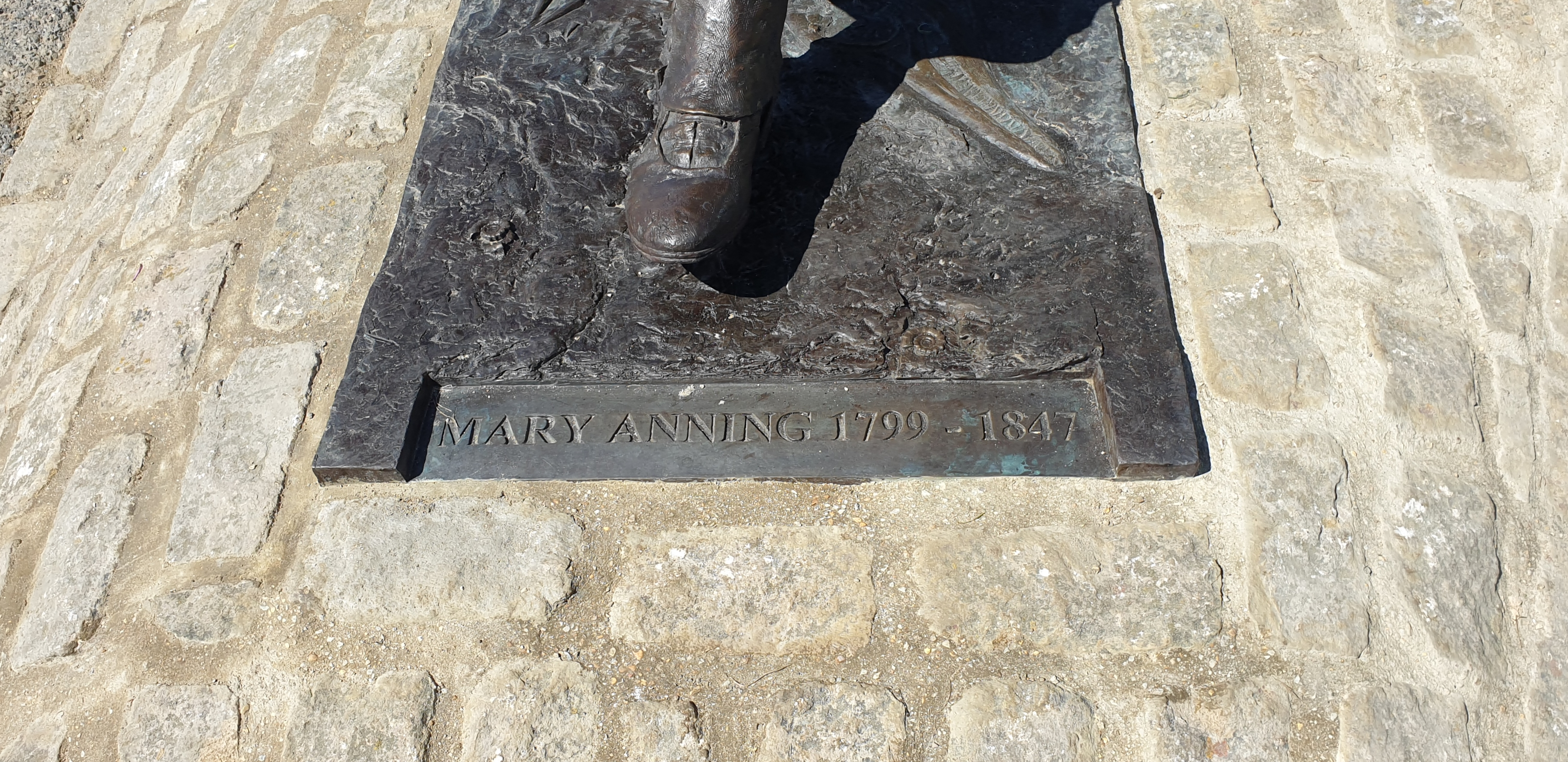
Inscription

== Unveiling ==
The statue was publicly unveiled by Evie Swire and Alice Roberts on 21 May 2022, the 223rd anniversary of Anning's birth. The event was attended by hundreds of supporters including Tracy Chevalier, Hugh Torrens, Anjana Khatwa, Dean Lomax, and Tori Herridge. The actress Lizzie Hopley performed as Mary Anning.

== Maquette tour ==
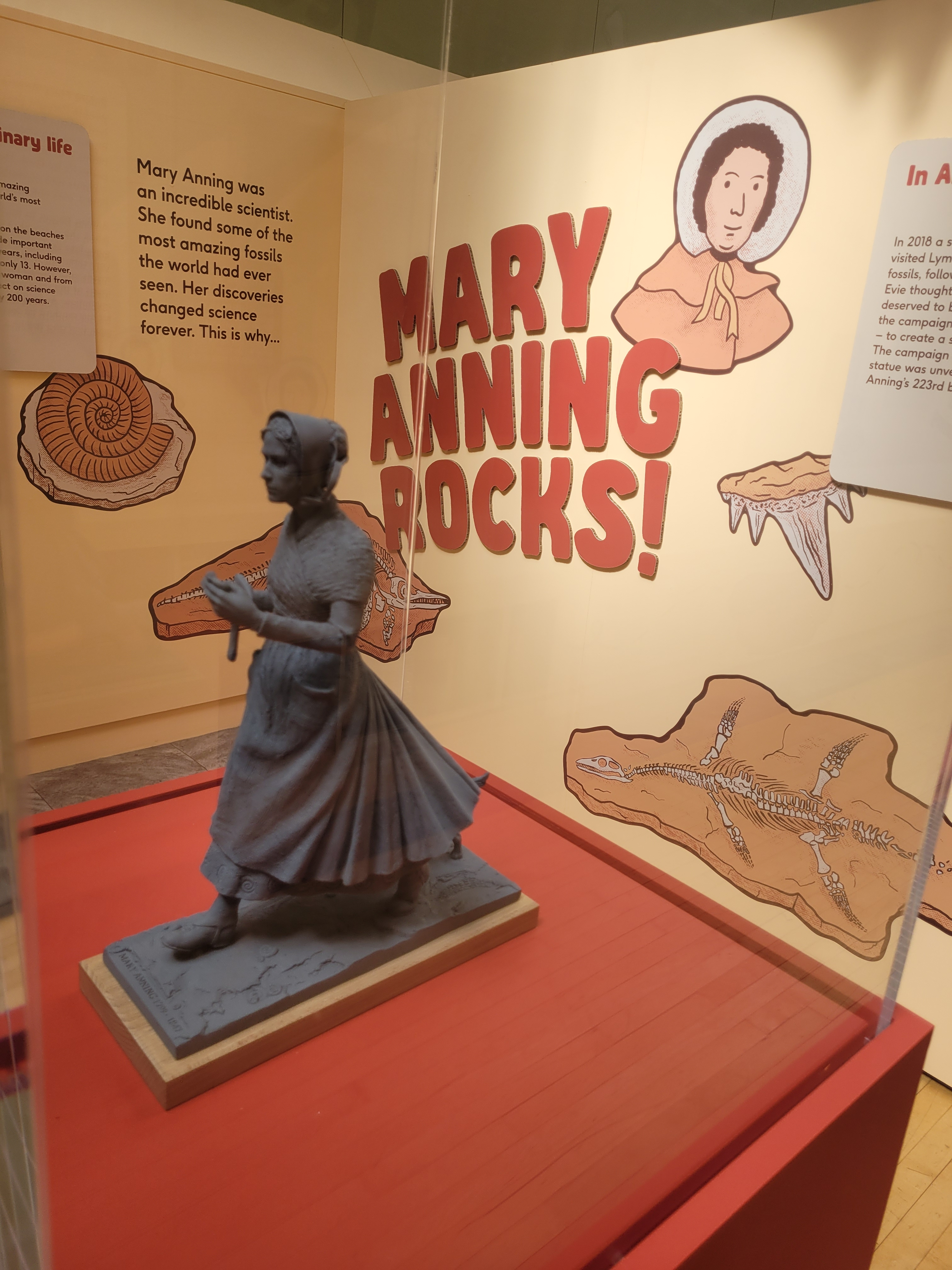
Mary Anning Statue maquette in the Yorkshire Museum, July 2023

After the original public display of the maquette it has been on tour around the UK. From May 2022 it has toured museums and geological venues including the Oxford Museum of Natural History, Lapworth Museum of Geology, and Creswell Crags. As of December 2023 it was in the Hastings Museum and Art Gallery and continued to tour until at October 2024.
