= Statue of Brian Clough, Middlesbrough =

2007 sculpture

Coordinates: 54°33′52″N 1°14′21″W

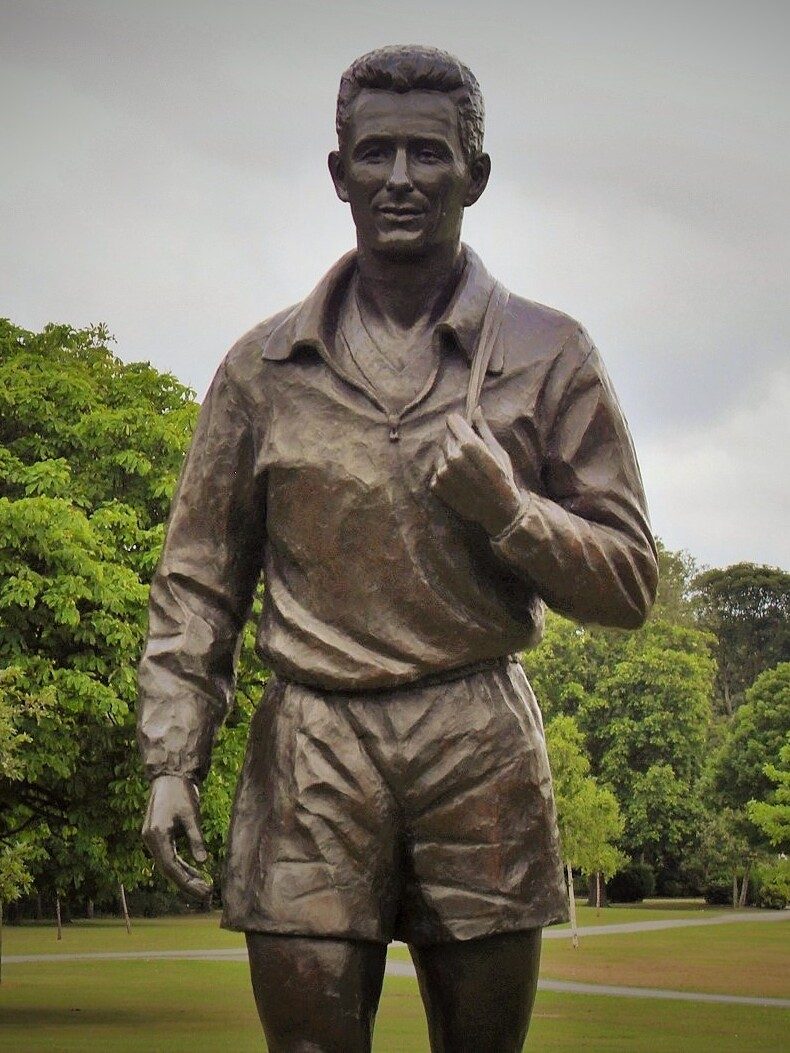

A statue of English football player and manager Brian Clough, by sculptor Vivien Mallock, was unveiled on 16 May 2007 in Albert Park in Clough's hometown of Middlesbrough.

== Fundraising ==
Clough died on 20 September 2004, aged 69. In November, 1,000 people did a sponsored walk across the Tees Transporter Bridge to raise money for a memorial. After a vote of 1,000 participants, it was announced in December that it would depict Clough walking to training at Middlesbrough F.C.'s Ayresome Park ground. In November 2006, the National Lottery Heritage Fund put £49,800 to the £65,000 costs estimated by Middlesbrough Council.

== Design ==
The 7-foot bronze statue by Vivien Mallock shows Clough making his journey to Ayresome Park through Albert Park, from his home on Valley Road, carrying his football boots over his shoulder. The statue was unveiled by his widow and his three children, including Nigel Clough.

Ten 18-inch replicas were sold by a memorial fund for £500 each in August 2007, to pay for upkeep of the statue.

== Maintenance ==
A fatigue fracture was found on the statue's right leg, where the real Clough had suffered a ligament injury in 1962. The statue was fenced off and sent in March 2009 for specialist repairs in Surrey, at a cost of £19,000 and duration of ten weeks. In 2016, a crack emerged on the ankle of the same leg, and the statue was fenced off and then repaired over six months. A further crack led to the statue being fenced off in 2022, and severed at the ankles to move it in May 2026, before being put back together and cast in a new foundation block.
