= Middlesbrough Mela =

Annual festival in North Yorkshire, England

- Frequency: Annual
- Location: Middlesbrough
- Years active: 36
- Established: 1990
- Attendance: 50,000
- Website: https://middlesbroughmela.co.uk

The Middlesbrough Mela (also known as BoroMela) is a free, annual two-day long multi-cultural festival and mela held in Middlesbrough, England and is one of the largest events of its kind in North East England.

== History ==
The Middlesbrough Mela is a blend of the traditional Mela (Sanskrit: मेला) and a celebration of the multicultural life of the people of Middlesbrough. It is collaboratively organised by a committee of residents supported by Middlesbrough Council.

The Mela was first held in Middlesbrough Central Gardens, now Centre Square, in 1990 and has moved between this venue and the larger Albert Park, which it returned to in 2019 after a seven-year break.

In 2009 localised flooding at Albert Park caused the event to be cancelled. In 2015, its 25th anniversary drew a record audience of up to 50,000 over the two days of the festival. In 2020 it would have celebrated its 30th anniversary, however, the festival has been cancelled due to the global pandemic.

== Festival Programme ==
The festival celebrates culture and entertainment through world class music, from Hip hop to Bhangra, which are performed across the main and alternative stages. The musical performances are complemented by a wide range of other family friendly activities from across a range of cultures. There is a bazaar featuring a wide range of stalls and a food market featuring cuisines from around the world. Other local organisations such as Middlesbrough Institute of Modern Art frequently organise activities and events to complement the mela.

Notable past performers have included: Hunterz, Raxstar, Rameet Kaur, Lehmber Hussainpuri.

Past sponsors of the event have included Middlesbrough Council, Middlesbrough College, Cleveland Police and Crime Commissioner, Unison, Arts Council England, Coast & Country Housing and the Cleveland Centre.
