= Francis William Doyle Jones =

British sculptor (1873-1938)

- Born: 11 November 1873; Hartlepool, England
- Died: 10 June 1938 (aged 64); St Luke's Hospital, Chelsea, London
- Education: National Art Training School
- Known for: Sculpture

Francis William Doyle Jones, sometimes Francis William Doyle-Jones, (11 November 1873–10 June 1938) was a British sculptor. Although principally a portrait sculptor, Jones is notable for the number of war memorials he created for British towns and cities following both the Boer War and World War I.

== Biography ==
Jones was born, to Irish parents, in Hartlepool. He was the eldest son of a stonemason and monumental sculptor, Francis Jones (c. 1846–1918), from County Monaghan and for a time worked for his father before studying in Paris. Jones returned to England to study at the National Art Training School in London, where he was taught by Édouard Lantéri. After graduating, Jones established a studio at Chelsea in west London and had his first sculpture shown at the Royal Academy in 1903. Between then and 1936, Jones had about thirty works, including portraits and statuettes, exhibited at the Royal Academy. Throughout the 1910s, he also regularly exhibited with the International Society of Sculptors, Painters and Gravers and at the annual exhibition of Works by Artists from the Northern Counties held at the Laing Art Gallery in Newcastle upon Tyne.

From 1904 to 1906 Jones created a series of Boer War memorials for British towns. For the memorials at Penrith and Gateshead he created identical memorials featuring a female figure representing Peace crowning the Heroes. Following the end of World War I Jones won several commissions for further public war memorials. He created several designs, including cenotaphs, for these works but in some instances, such as for the memorials at Woking, Gravesend and Brighouse he used a common design with a figure of Victory standing on a globe and holding a wreath of laurel leaves.

Jones had a keen appreciation of Irish culture and, from early in his career, received several public commissions from Irish organisations, most notably for a monumental statue of Saint Patrick at Saul, County Down. From 1923 onwards, he was a regular exhibitor with the Royal Hibernian Academy, RHA, in Dublin. Shown at the RHA in 1923, Jones' bust of Michael Collins was acquired by the National Gallery of Ireland in 1924 while the Hugh Lane Gallery in Dublin holds a bronze bust of Joseph Devlin by Jones.

Jones was elected an associate member of the Royal Society of British Sculptors in 1923.

== Public works ==
=== 1900–1909 ===
Image	Title / subject	Location and coordinates	Date	Type	Material	Dimensions	Designation	Wikidata	Notes
More images	Boer War memorial	Albert Park, Middlesbrough	1905	Obelisk on pedestal with panels	Peterhead granite	6.7m tall	Grade II	Q26614806	
	Boer War memorial	Saltwell Park, Gateshead	1905	Statue on column	Bronze & granite		Grade II	Q26540952	
More images	Boer War memorial	Town Hall Gardens, Llanelli, Carmarthenshire	1905	Statue on a pedestal and plinth	Bronze & granite		Grade II	Q29490306	
	Boer War memorial	Ward Jackson Park, Hartlepool	1905	Statue on pedestal	Bronze & granite		Grade II		The statue was stolen in 1965 and only the pedestal remains in place.
More images	Boer War memorial	Castle Park, Penrith, Cumbria	1906	Statue on column	Bronze & granite		Grade II	Q66478786	
	John Mandeville	Newmarket Square, Michelstown, County Down	1906	Statue on pedestal	Bronze & granite				

=== 1910–1919 ===
Image	Title / subject	Location and coordinates	Date	Type	Material	Dimensions	Designation	Wikidata	Notes
More images	Matthew Webb	Marine Parade, Dover, Kent	1910	Bust on pedestal with plaque	Bronze & granite			Q117405781	
More images	Robert Burns	Galashiels, Scottish Borders	1912	Bust on pedestal	Bronze & granite		Category C	Q56633763	
	Chimera with Personifications of Fire and the Sea	24–28 Lombard Street, London	1914	Architectural sculpture	Stone		Grade II		Architects, Gordon & Gunton

=== 1920–1929 ===
Image	Title / subject	Location and coordinates	Date	Type	Material	Dimensions	Designation	Wikidata	Notes
More images	Bevans Cement Works war memorial	Northfleet Cement Works, Kent	c. 1920	Seated sculpture on cube pedestal with plaque	Concrete & bronze		Grade II	Q26671015	
More images	War memorial	The Esplanade, Weymouth, Dorset	1921	Cenotaph	Portland stone	5.3m tall	Grade II	Q26672299	
More images	War memorial	Teddington, London	1921	Cenotaph	Portland stone	5.4m tall	Grade II	Q66478655	
	Partick & Whiteinch war memorial	Victoria Park, Glasgow	1922	Statue on obelisk	Bronze & stone	8m tall	Category C	Q77782061	
More images	War memorial	Windmill Hill Gardens, Gravesend, Kent	1922	Statue on column	Bronze & stone	9.2m tall	Grade II	Q66477666	
	War memorial	The Park, Hullen Edge Road, Elland, West Yorkshire	1922	Statue on pedestal	Bronze & granite		Grade II	Q26427083	
More images	War memorial	Jubilee Square, Woking, Surrey	1922	Statue on column	Bronze & stone	5.2m tall	Grade II	Q66478558	
More images	War memorial	King Edward Square, Sutton Coldfield, Birmingham	1922	Statue on pedestal	Bronze & stone	6.4m tall	Grade II	Q26677176	
More images	War memorial	Abbey Fields, Kenilworth, Warwickshire	1922	Obelisk with relief & plaque	Stone		Grade II	Q26678076	
More images	War memorial	Rydings Park, Brighouse, West Yorkshire	1922	Statue on column	Bronze & granite		Grade II	Q26426829	
	War memorial	Station Road, Cockermouth, Cumbria	1922	Statue on column	Bronze & granite				
	Archbishop Thomas Croke	Liberty Square, Thurles, County Tipperary	1922	Statue on pedestal with statuettes	Bronze & limestone				
More images	Gillingham War Memorial	Medway Park, Mill Road, Gillingham, Kent	1924	Inscribed column	Stone		Grade II	Q26677893	
	War memorial	St Michael And All Angels Church, Houghton-le-Spring, Sunderland	1925	Cenotaph with relief figures	Portland stone	c. 6m tall	Grade II	Q66477939	
	Canon P.A Sheehan	Doneraile, County Cork	1925	Statue on pedestal	Bronze & stone				
	Cardinal Patrick O'Donnell	Cathedral of St Eunan and St Columba, Letterkenny	1929	Statue on pedestal					
More images	War memorial	Waterloo, Merseyside	c. 1920s	Statue on pedestal	Bronze & sandstone		Grade II	Q26548994	
	War memorial	Jarrow, South Tyneside	c. 1920s	Statue on column	Bronze & stone				

=== 1930 and later ===
Image	Title / subject	Location and coordinates	Date	Type	Material	Dimensions	Designation	Wikidata	Notes
More images	Edgar Wallace	107 Fleet Street, Ludgate Circus, London	1934	Plaque	Bronze				
More images	T. P. O'Connor	Chronicle House, Fleet Street, London	1935–1936	Bust and plaque	Bronze				
More images	Saint Patrick	Saul, County Down	1938	Statue on pedestal	Granite	11m tall			
More images	George V	Howard Davis Park, Jersey	1939	Statue on pedestal	Bronze & granite			Q99528341	Completed by William Reid Dick following death of Jones in 1938.

=== Other works ===
- At the Royal Academy in 1909, Jones exhibited the silver relief sculpture White Horses, which was inspired by a Rudyard Kipling poem and was designed for Harley Hall near Northallerton.
- The offering of youth on the altar of patriotism, a relief shown at the Royal Hibernian Academy in 1925.
