= Royal Tank Regiment Memorial =

War memorial in Whitehall Court, London

Coordinates: 51.5061°N 0.1245°W

- United Kingdom
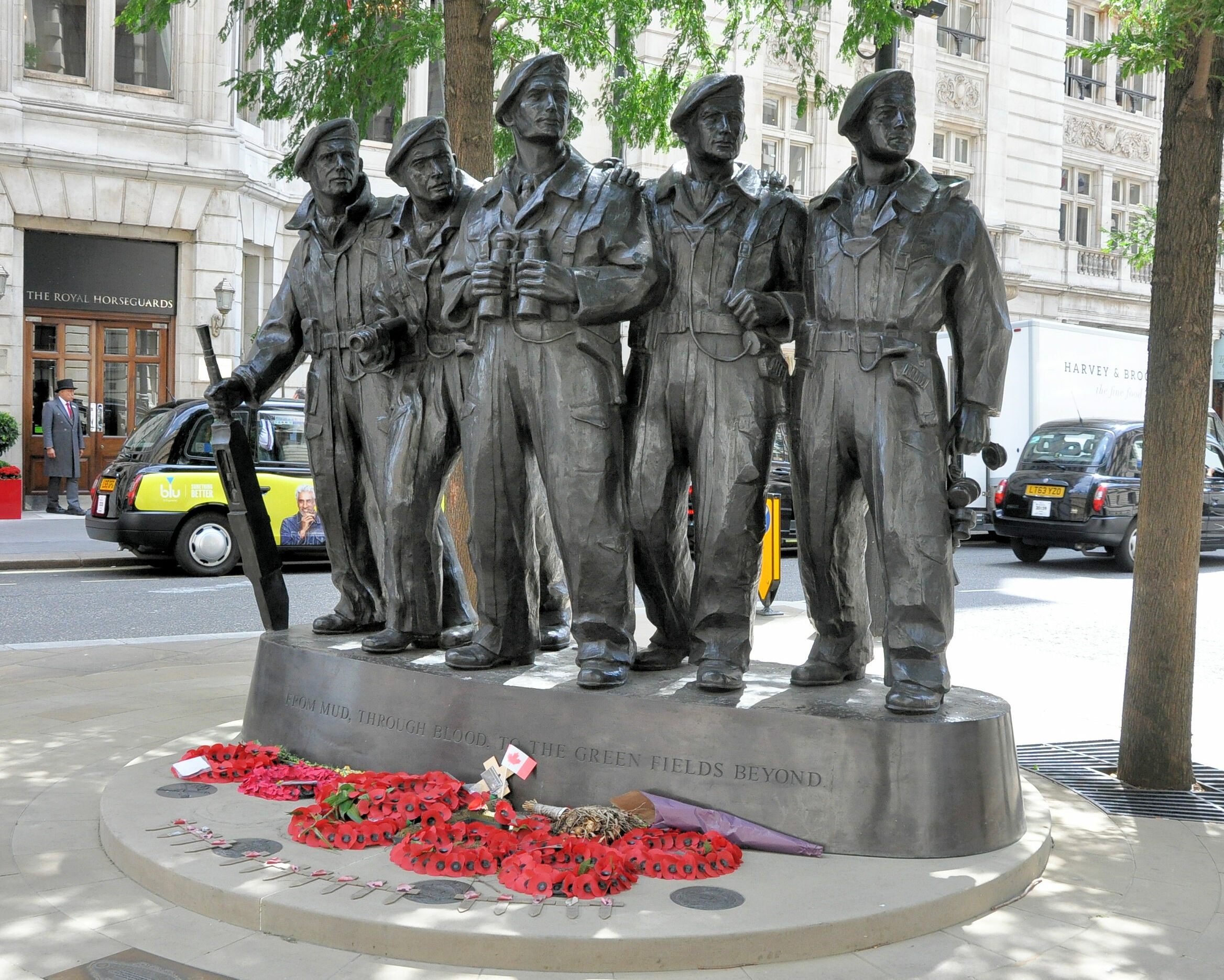
- For the men of the Royal Tank Regiment and its predecessors the Heavy Section and Heavy Branch of the Machine Gun Corps, the Tank Corps, and the Royal Tank Corps
- Unveiled: 13 June 2000
- Location: Whitehall Court (overlooking Whitehall Place), London
- Designed by: Vivien Mallock after George Henry Paulin (sculpture); Christopher Rainsford for HOK International

The Royal Tank Regiment Memorial is a sculpture by Vivien Mallock in Whitehall Court, London. It commemorates the Royal Tank Regiment.

The sculptural group depicts the five-man crew of a World War II–era Comet tank at 1½ times life size. General Sir Antony Walker, who was in charge of fundraising for the memorial, described it as "a memorial to the men of the regiment, rather than the machines". It is an enlarged version of a maquette by George Henry Paulin in the Tank Museum, Bovington, Dorset, which dates to 1953. Mallock's husband had been an officer in the RTR in the 1960s. A resin cast of Mallock's group also stands outside the Tank Museum.

The memorial was unveiled by Queen Elizabeth II, Colonel-in-Chief of the RTR, on 13 June 2000. She was escorted to the ceremony by an armoured Rolls-Royce from 1924, a precursor to the tank. The date was the centenary of a battle in the Second Boer War in which the tank pioneer Sir Ernest Dunlop Swinton took part. Other memorials to the RTR are in Newcastle-upon-Tyne and the National Memorial Arboretum in Alrewas, Staffordshire.

== Gallery ==
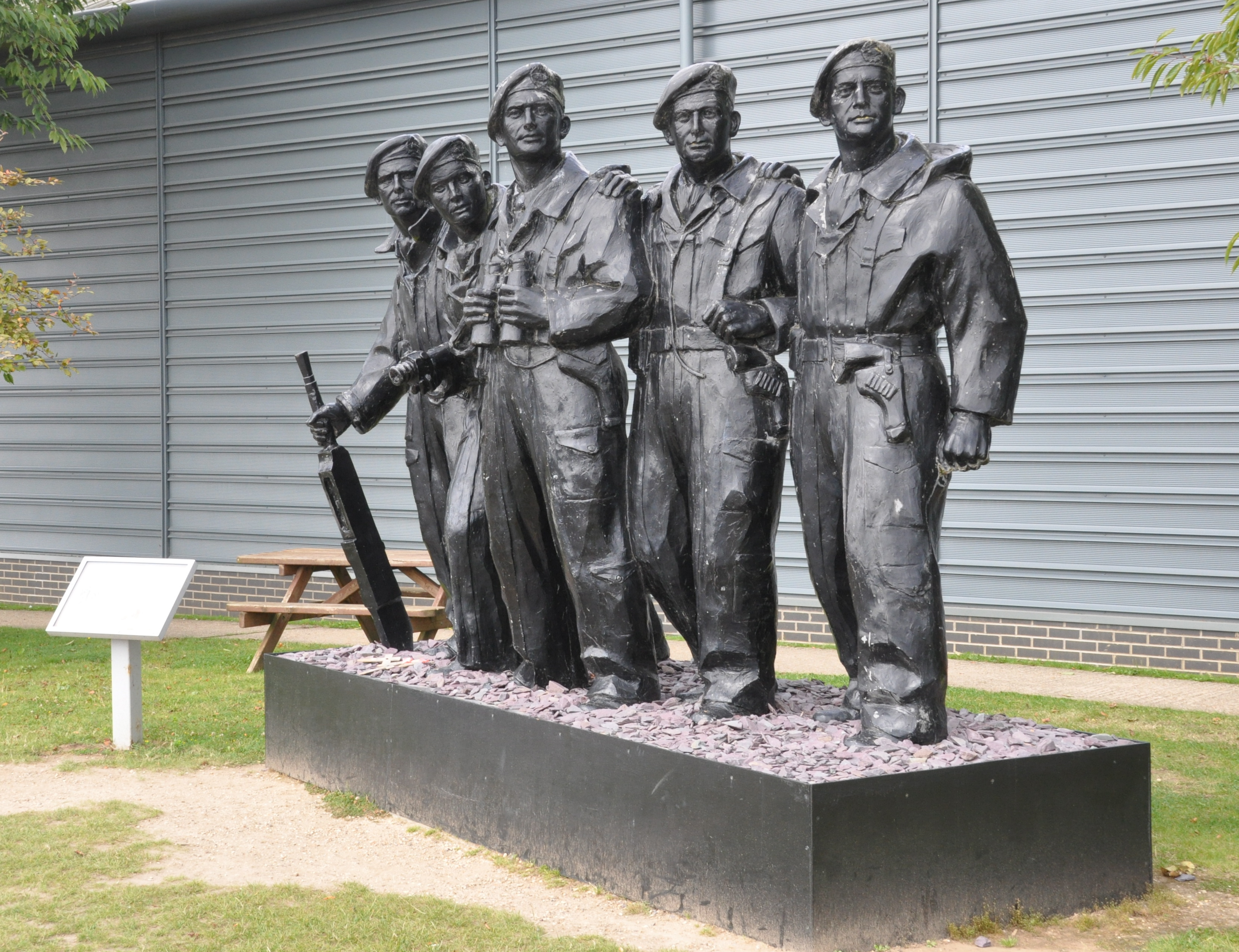
Bovington Tank Museum, Dorset

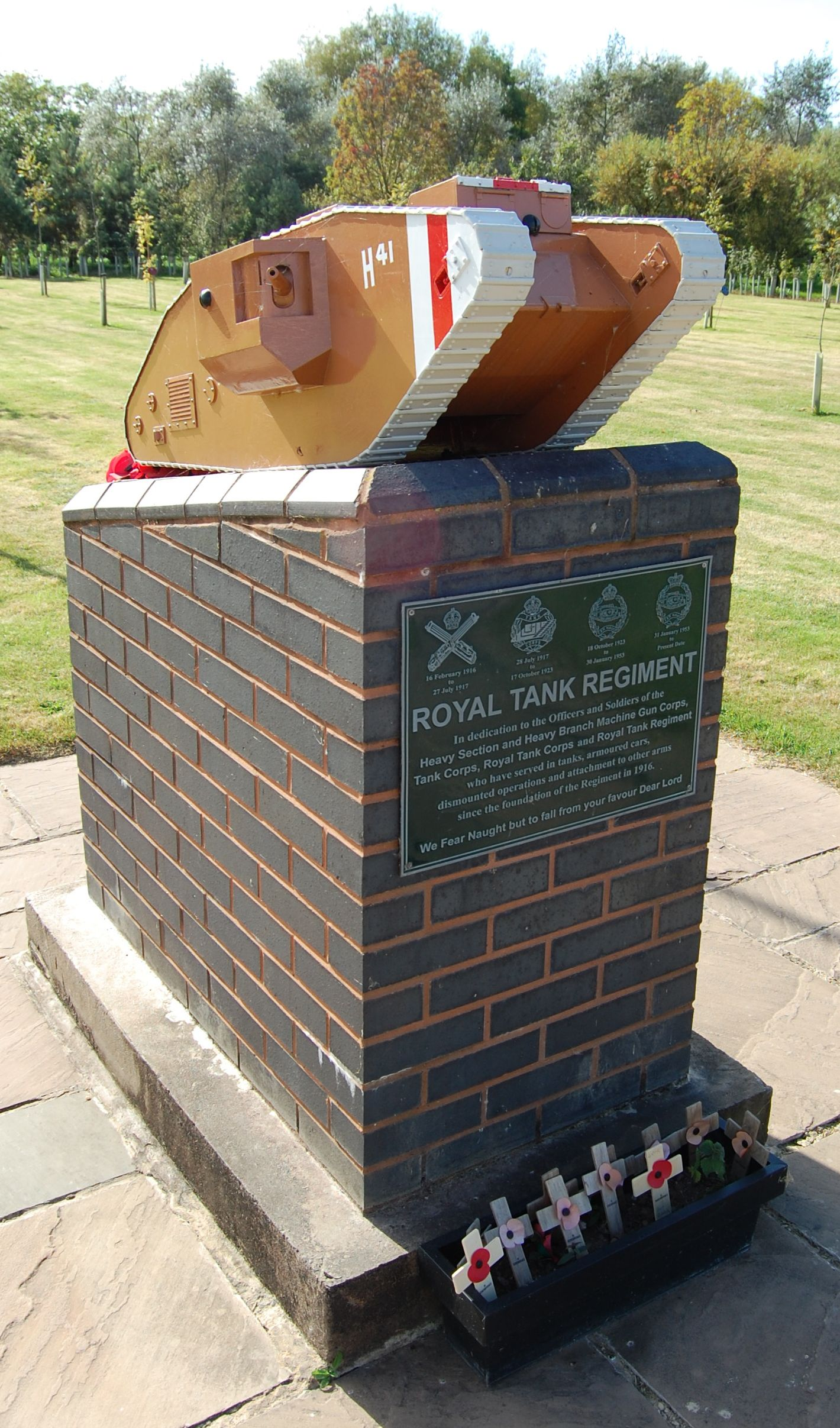
The RTR memorial in the National Memorial Arboretum

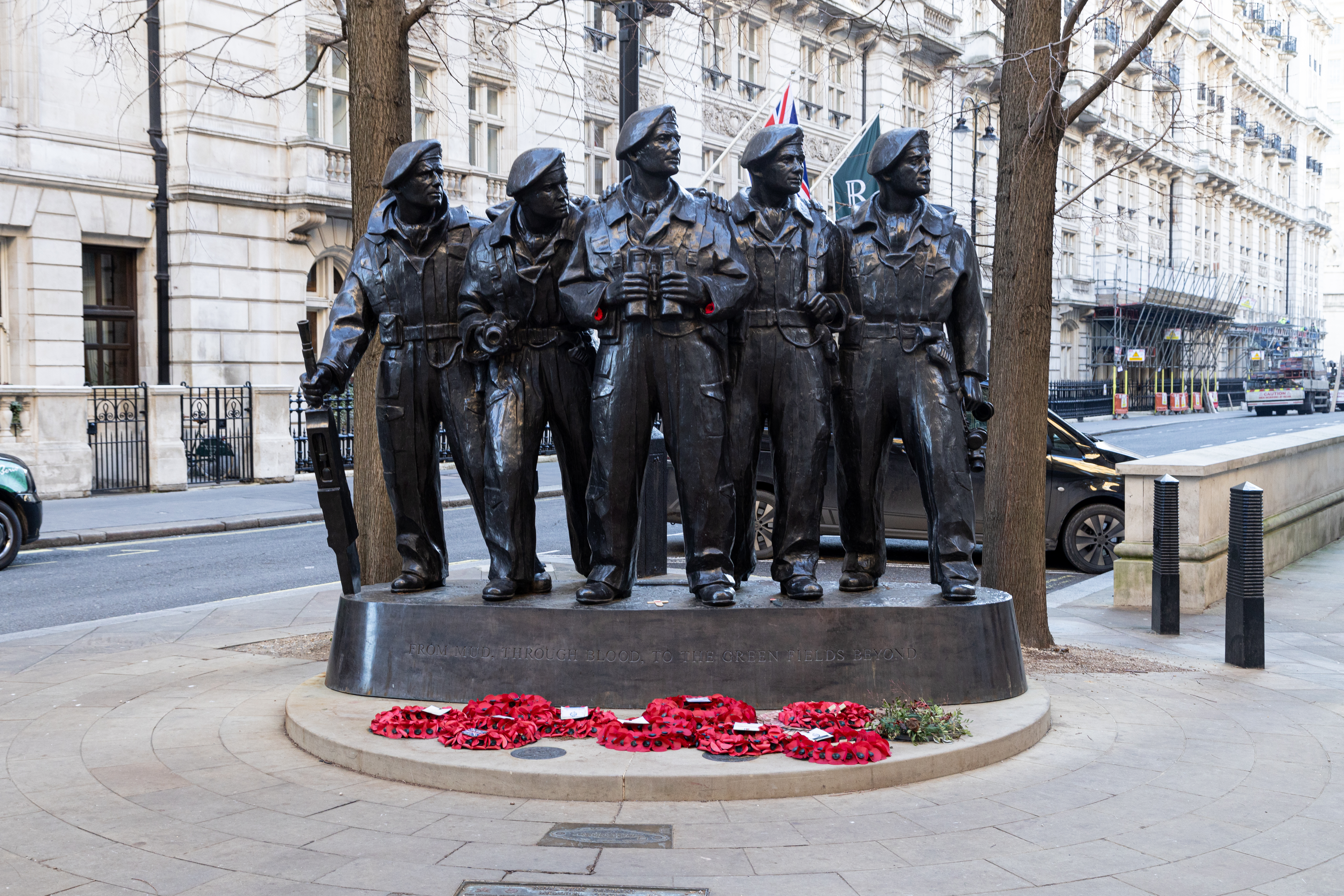
London Memorial in 2026
