= Albert Park, Middlesbrough =

Public park in North Yorkshire, England

Albert Park
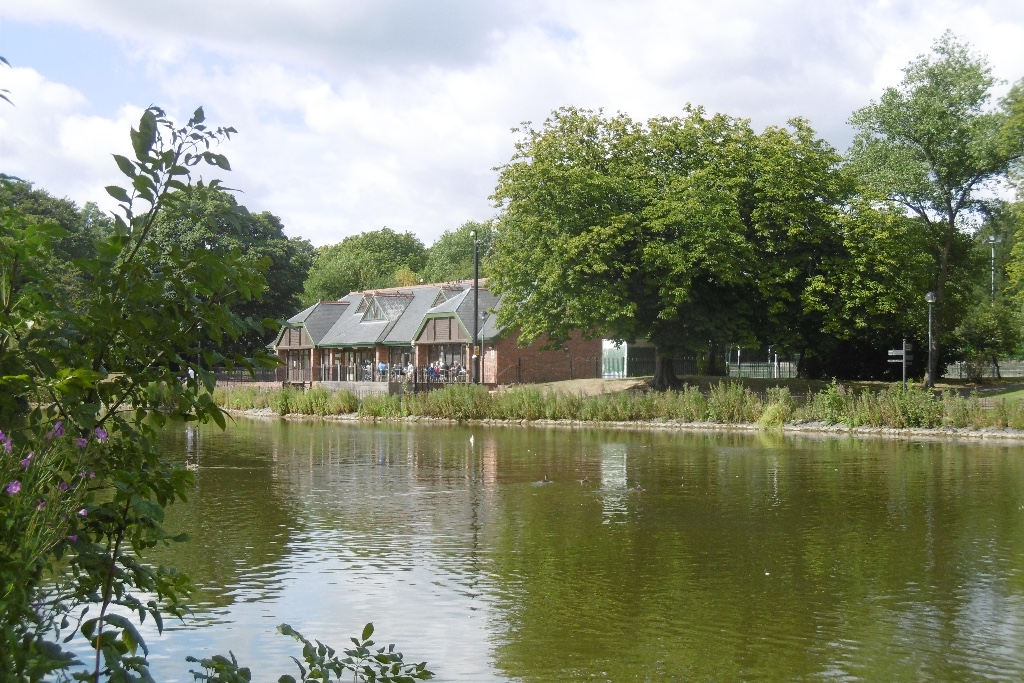
- Lower Lake
- Interactive map of Albert Park
- Type: Urban Park
- Location: Middlesbrough
- Coordinates: 54.565°N 1.235°W
- Area: 72 acres (29 ha)
- Opened: August 11, 1868
- Awards: Green Flag

Albert Park is an open access, free public park, located in Middlesbrough, in the borough of Middlesbrough and the ceremonial county of North Yorkshire, England.

The park has been granted the Green Flag Award by the Civic Trust.

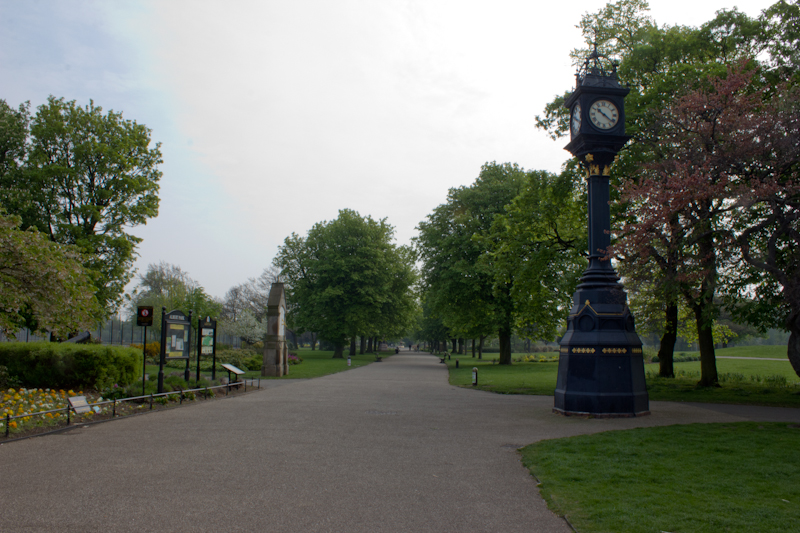
Footpath near main entrance

== History ==
The town's first mayor and MP, Henry Bolckow, first proposed the idea of a public park for the residents of Middlesbrough, dubbed the 'People's Park' in its conception. Bolckow was particularly conscious of the need to provide a "green lung" to ease the plight of the burgeoning industrial population of a town which was granted its charter of incorporation in 1853.

In 1864, Bolckow bought land off Linthorpe Road and presented it to Middlesbrough Borough Council for use as a public park. An agreement drawn up between Bolckow and the Council in 1865 specified that the park be called Albert Park and that £3,000 be spent on laying it out. Work commenced in 1865 to a design by William Barratt, using trees and shrubs from his nursery in Wakefield. The park was completed at a cost of £30,000. Albert Park was officially opened by Prince Arthur of Connaught later Duke of Connaught (seventh child of Queen Victoria) on 11 August 1868, the park being named after his father Prince Albert.

Less than ten years after the park was opened, Middlesbrough Football Club was formed by players of Middlesbrough Cricket Club. For two years it was the club's first ground, the football club's exit was due to damage to parts of the Park by players and supporters.

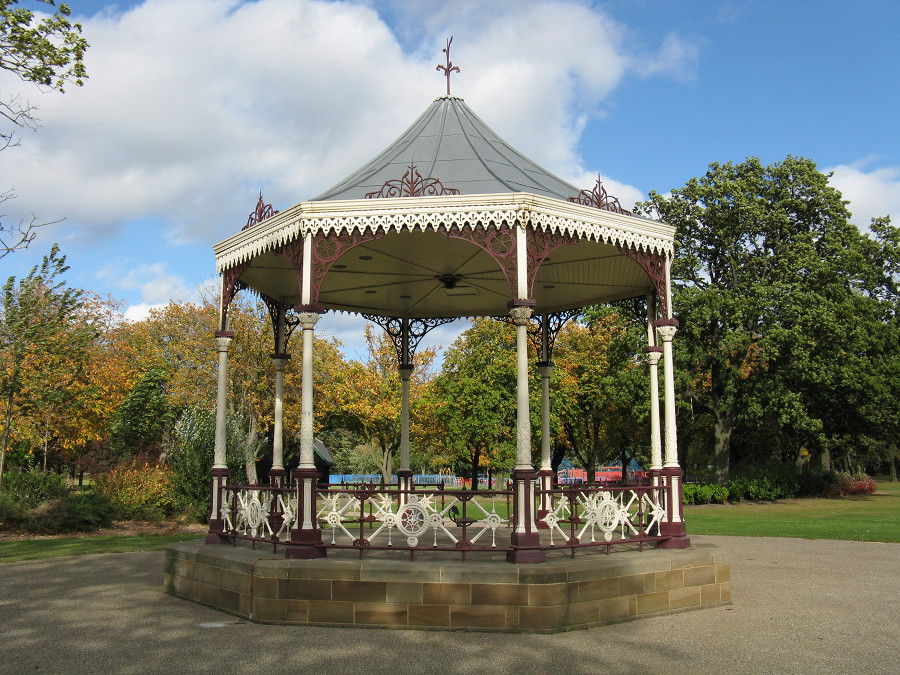
The reproduced bandstand

Albert Park underwent a major refurbishment, completed in 2005 with the support of a £3.5 million grant from the Heritage Lottery Fund topped up by money from Middlesbrough Council and Northumbrian Water Environmental Trust. Features such as the tower clock, war memorial walls, bandstand, fountain, South African war memorial, sundial and West Lodge were restored. The bandstand was a reproduction of the original park bandstand. A new visitor centre was created and there was considerable improvement to the lake. New facilities such as boathouse, roller rink, and teenage play area were built.

== Landmarks ==
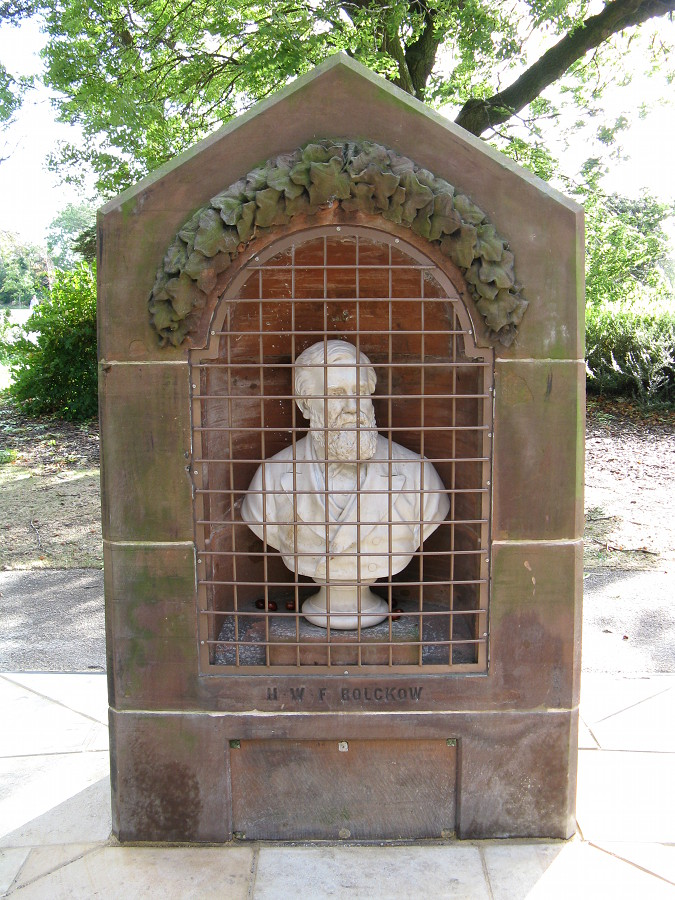
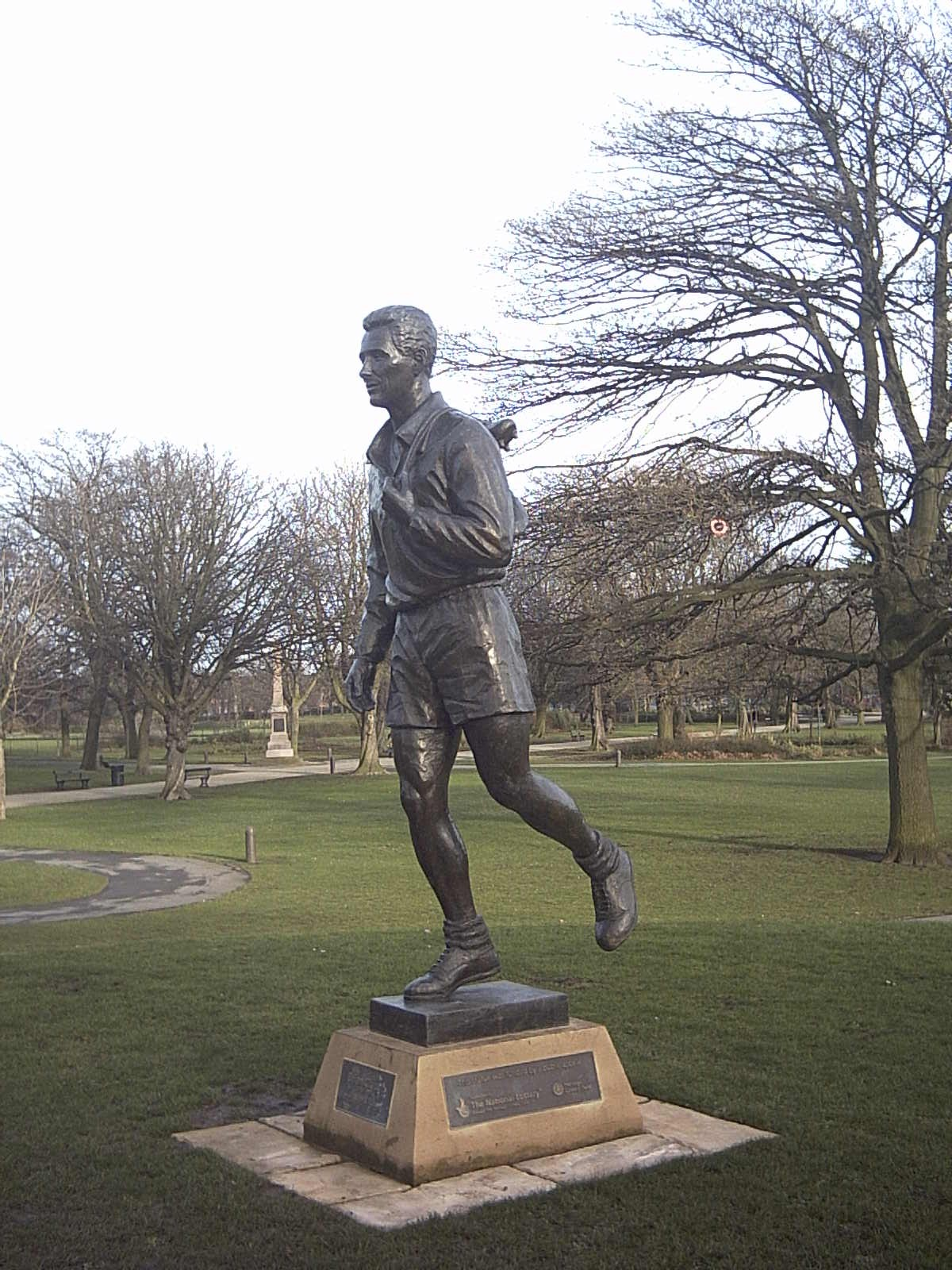
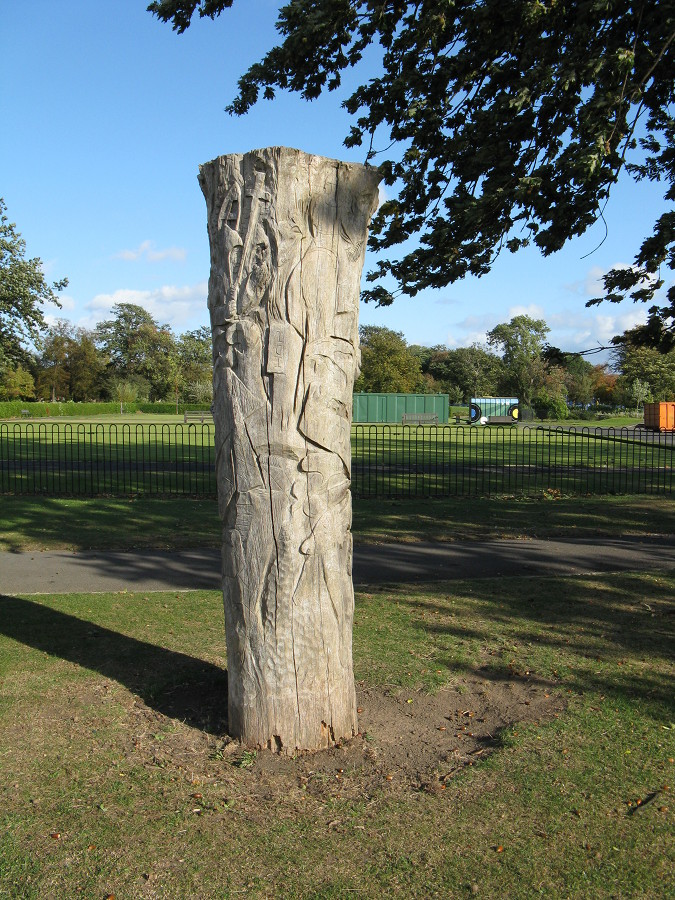
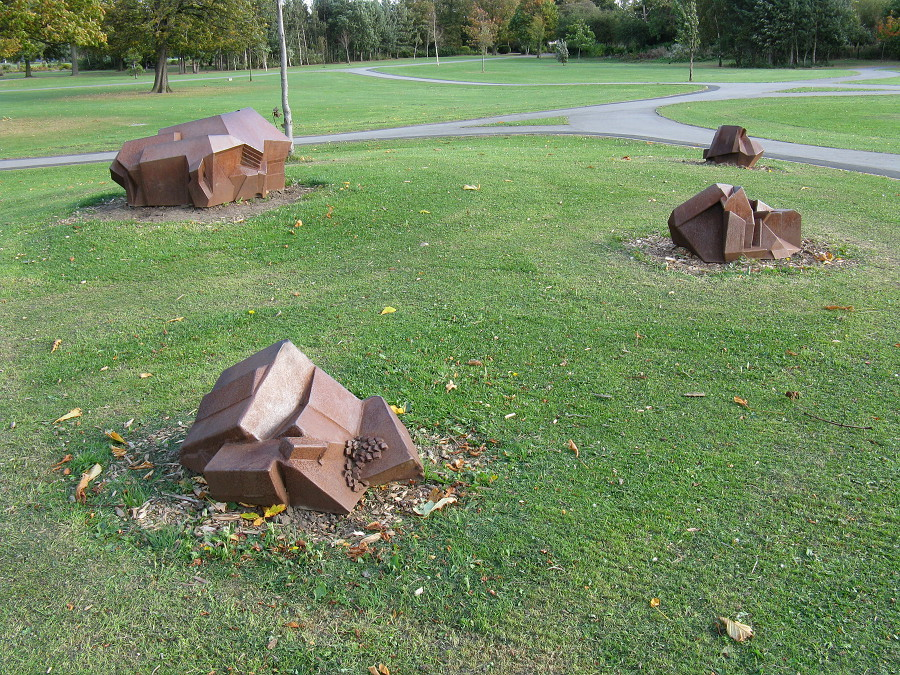
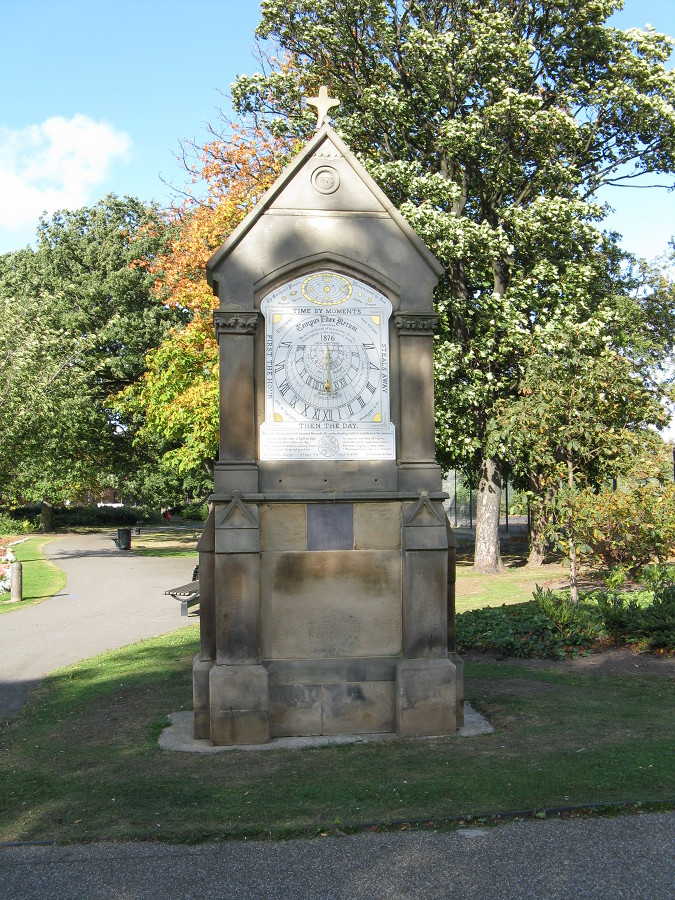
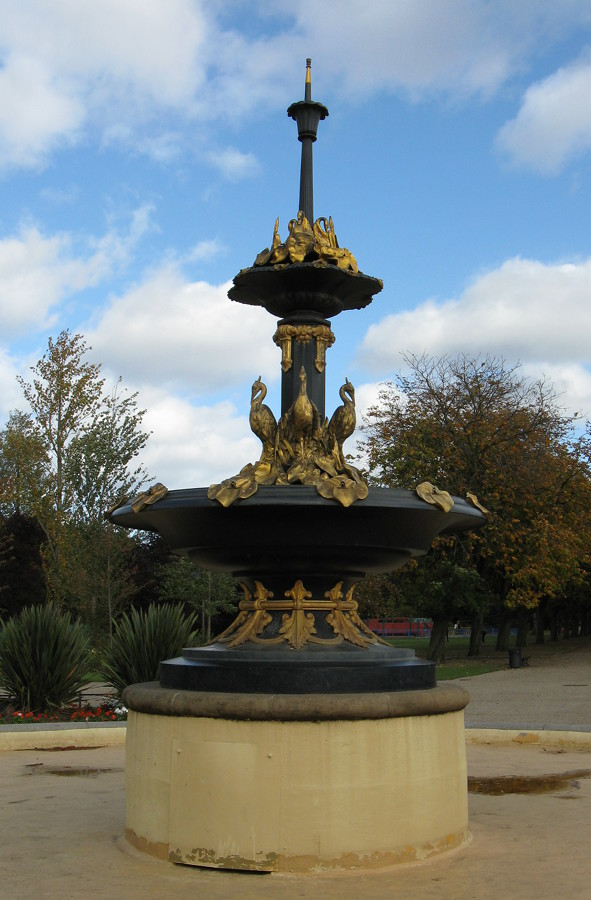
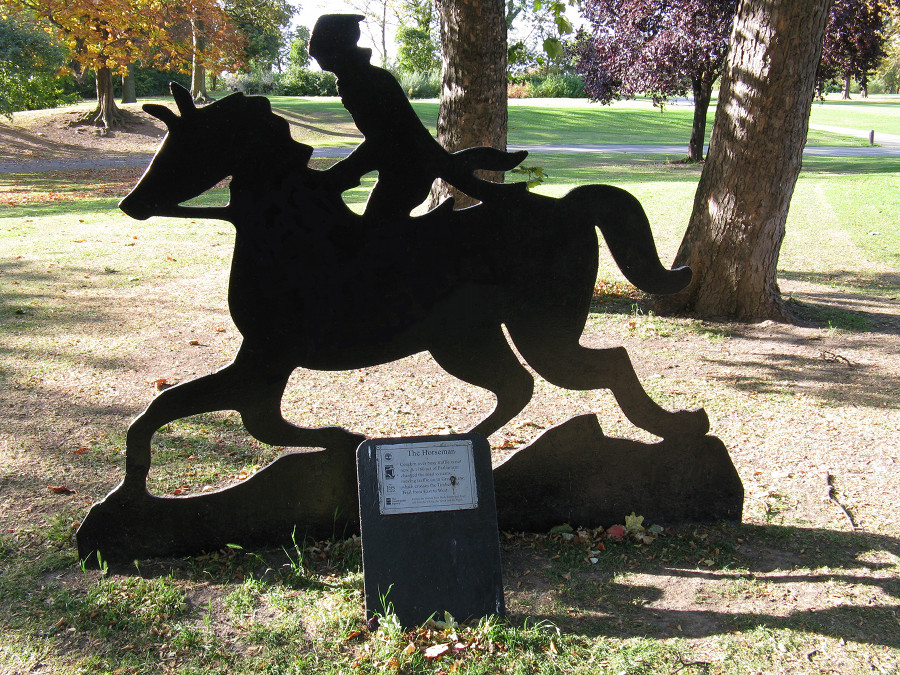
Henry Bolckow bust, Statue of Brian Clough, Voyages of Captain Cook carving, crystallisation sculpture, sundial, centre fountain and horseman memorial (Part of the Marton West Beck series)

On 16 May 2007, a statue was unveiled at the park which depicts Brian Clough at the start of his football career. The 7 ft-tall bronze figure, sculpted by Vivien Mallock, shows a 24-year-old Clough with his boots slung over his shoulder striding towards Ayresome Park, Middlesbrough's former ground, on his way to training.

A grade II listed sundial, designed and constructed by John Smith of Stockton, was donated by H. W. F. Bolckow in 1879. The sundial allows people within the park itself to read the time in the UK, New York City and Melbourne.

The central fountain in Albert Park, was originally presented by Joseph Pease in 1869. It underwent substantial renovation and was switched back on Friday 2 April 2004.

A cannon captured by British forces after the Siege of Sevastopol is displayed in the park, located near the main entrance gate by the Dorman Museum.

== Events ==
A Parkrun takes place every Saturday morning at 9 am.

A Junior Parkrun for 4-14 year olds takes place every Sunday morning at 9 am.

It also hosts the annual Middlesbrough Mela.

== Image gallery ==
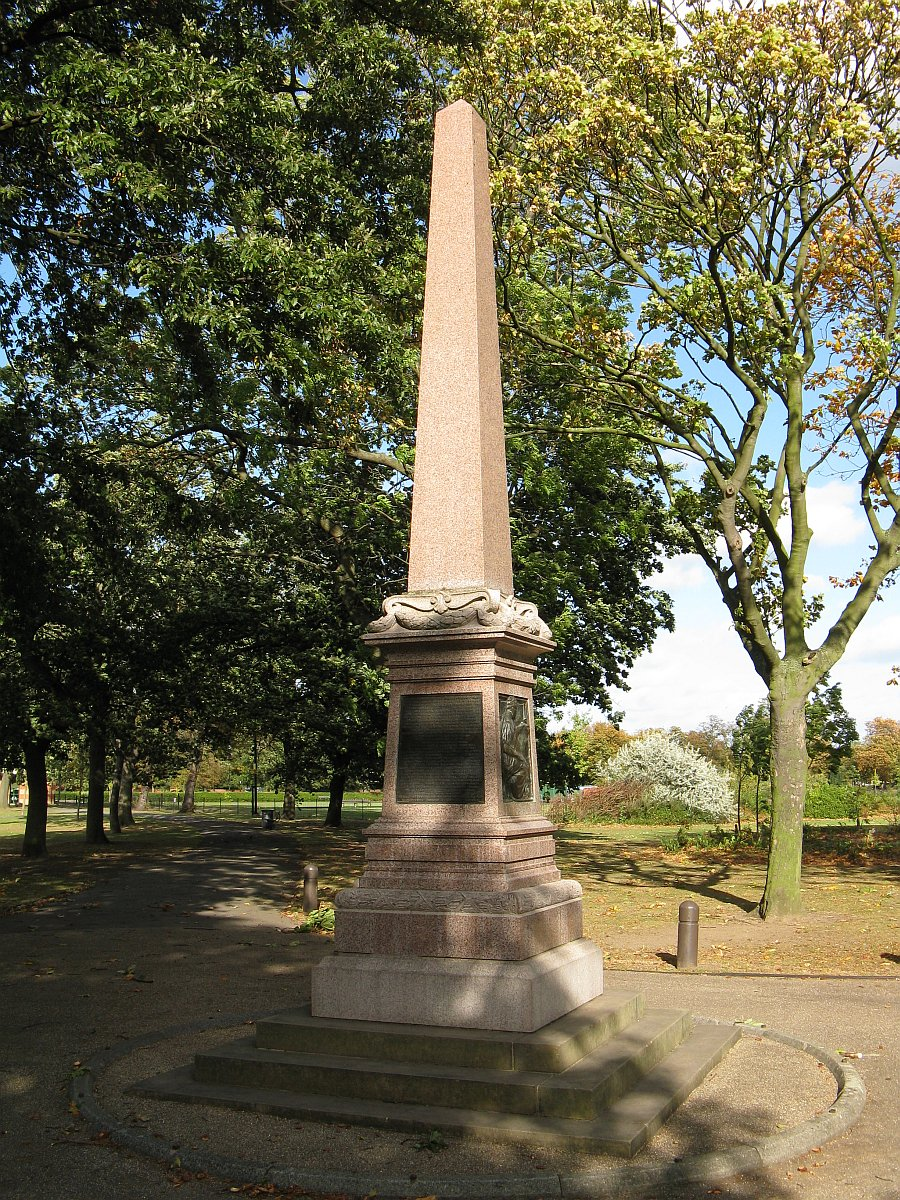
The South African Memorial ^{*}

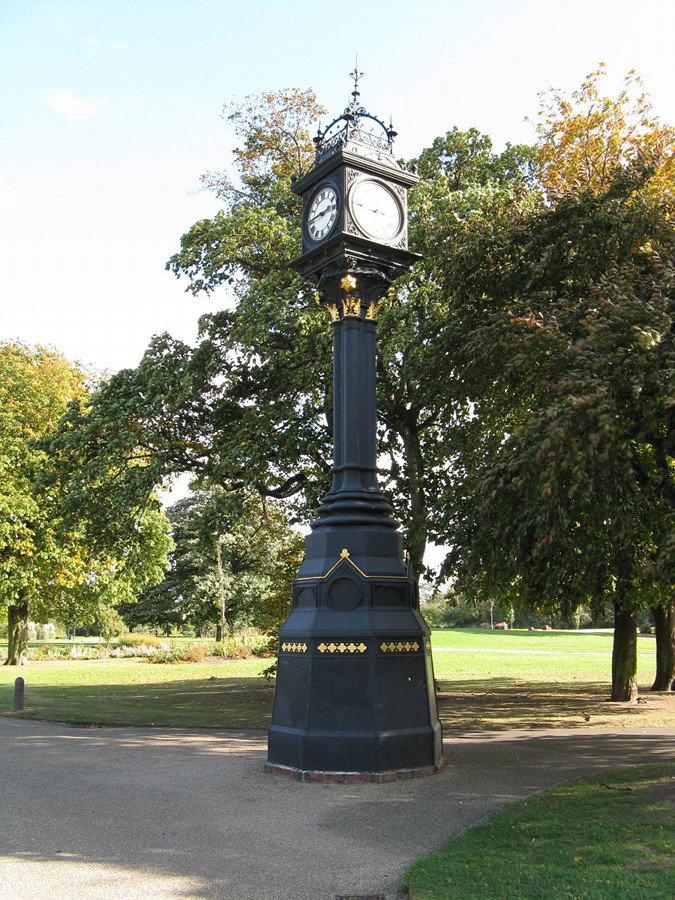
Memorial Clock Tower ^{*}

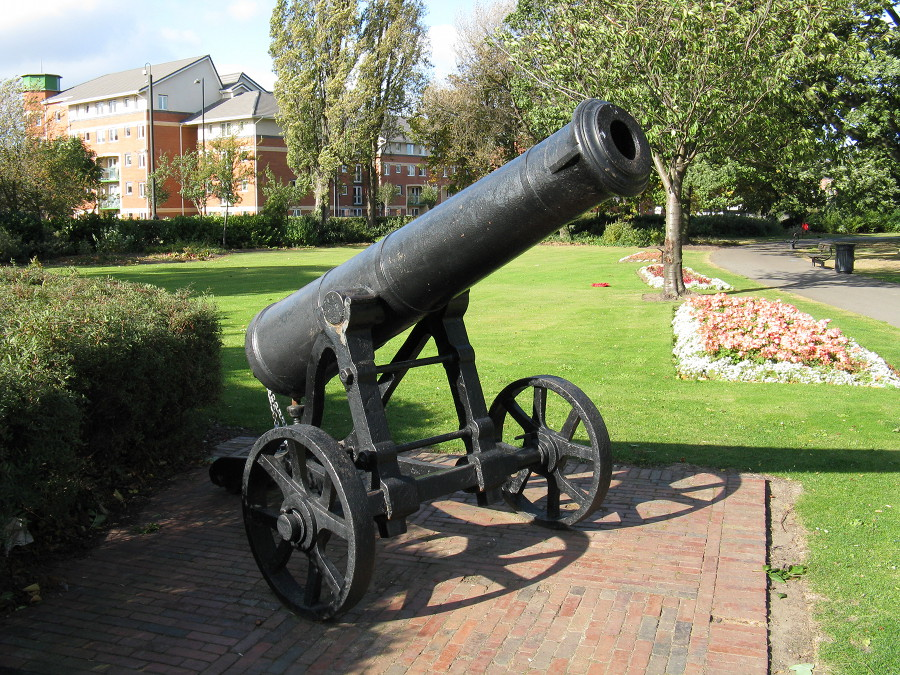
Sebastapol cannon

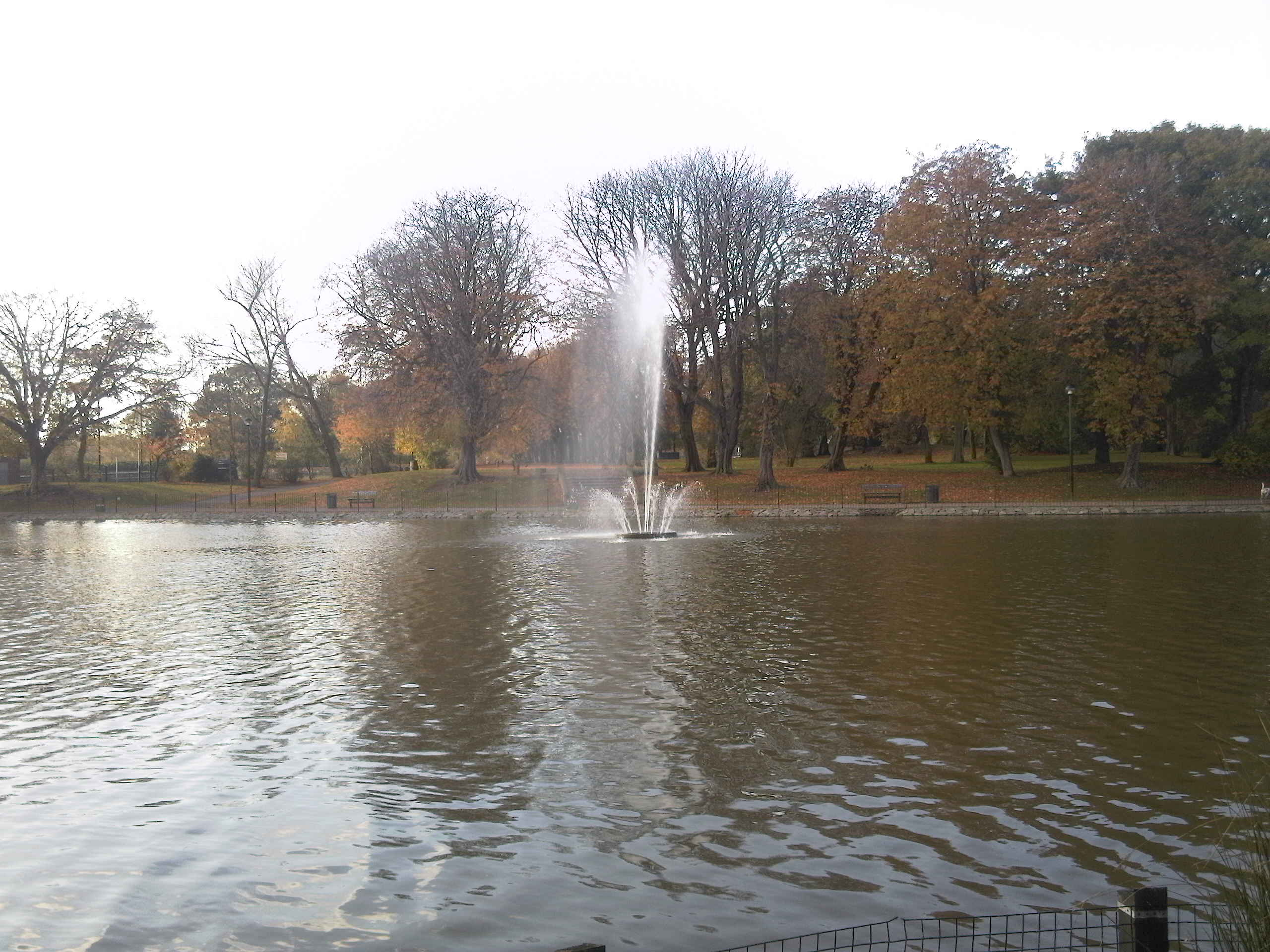
Lower lake used for boating and fishing

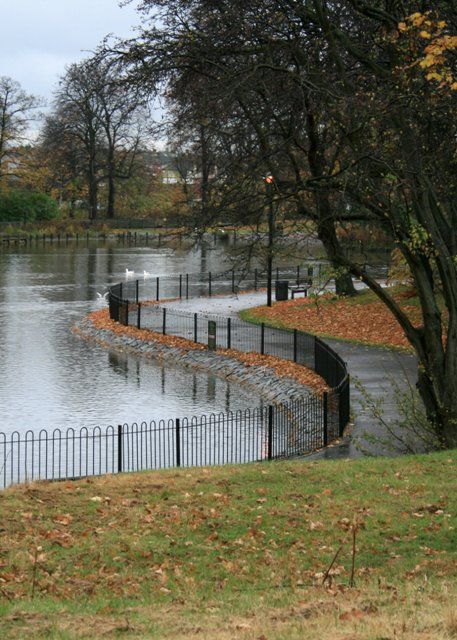
Lower Lake
^{*} listed building
