= Statue of Queen Victoria, Weymouth =

Sculpture by George Blackall Simonds

Coordinates: 50.6187°N 2.4507°W

Queen Victoria Statue
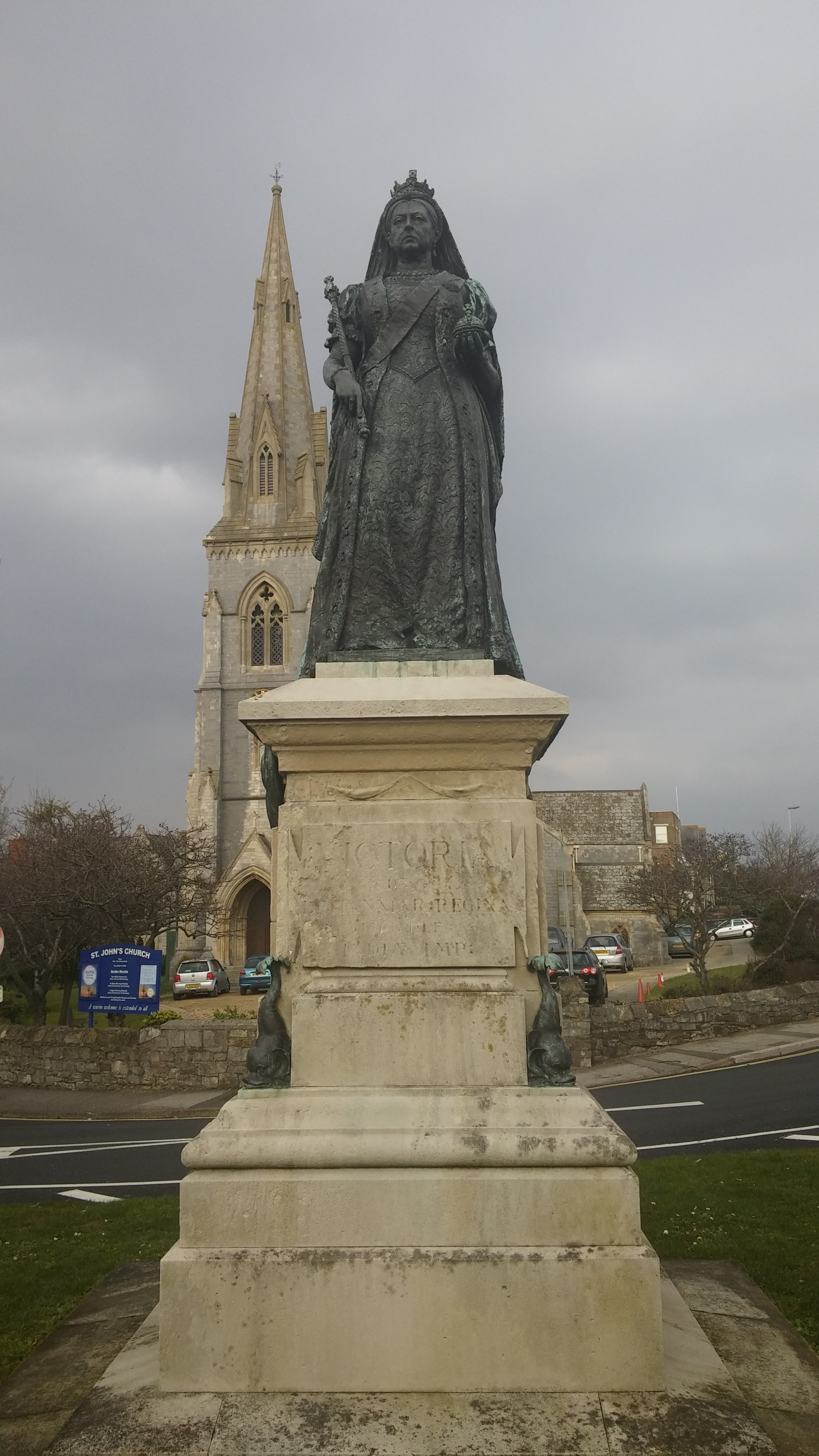
- Artist: George Blackall Simonds
- Year: 1902
- Type: Bronze figure with Portland stone podium
- Location: Weymouth

Queen Victoria Statue is a statue of Queen Victoria, located at Weymouth, Dorset in England. Designed by George Blackall Simonds, the statue was erected to commemorate the Queen's reign. It features a life-size bronze figure of the Queen on a podium made from Portland stone by Messrs. Singer, of Frome. The mayor of Weymouth, John Bagg, organised the collection of funds for the statue, which was unveiled by Princess Henry of Battenberg on 20 October 1902.

The statue has been a Grade II listed monument since 1997. Historic England recorded that the statue was in a "good position at the north entry to the town, but is less favourably placed than the corresponding King's Statue at the south end of the Esplanade". Plans for the statue's restoration were announced in 2007 and carried out in 2009 by Osirion Building Conservation.

== See also ==
- List of statues of Queen Victoria
