= Vivien Mallock =

English sculptor

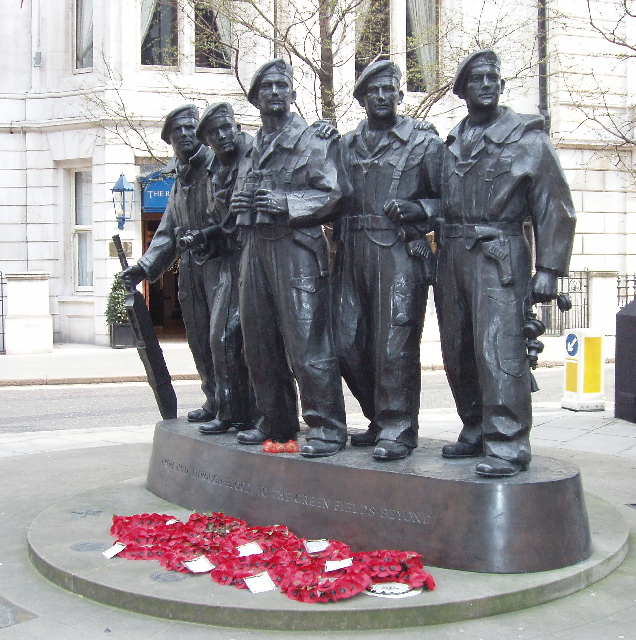
The Royal Tank Regiment Memorial

Vivien Mallock FRBS (born 8 May 1945) is an English sculptor who works mainly in bronze. Her career started at the Museum of Army Flying in Hampshire where she sculpted several celebrated World War II fighter pilots, including John Cunningham, to mark the 50th anniversary of the Battle of Britain. She became a member of the Armed Forces Art Society in 1992, a member of the Society of Women Artists in 1993 and an associate of the Royal British Society of Sculptors in 1998.

She was the last artist for whom The Queen Mother sat for a portrait; the resulting bust is now installed in the foyer of the Queen Elizabeth The Queen Mother Wing of St Mary's Hospital, London.

Some of her public statues are:

- The Royal Tank Regiment Memorial, Whitehall Court, London, unveiled by the Queen in 2000.
- Brigadier James Hill, unveiled in 2004 by the Prince of Wales as part of the commemoration of D-Day near the French village of Bavent.
- Walter Raleigh at East Budleigh, unveiled by the Duke of Kent in 2006.
- Brian Clough in Albert Park, Middlesbrough, unveiled in 2007.

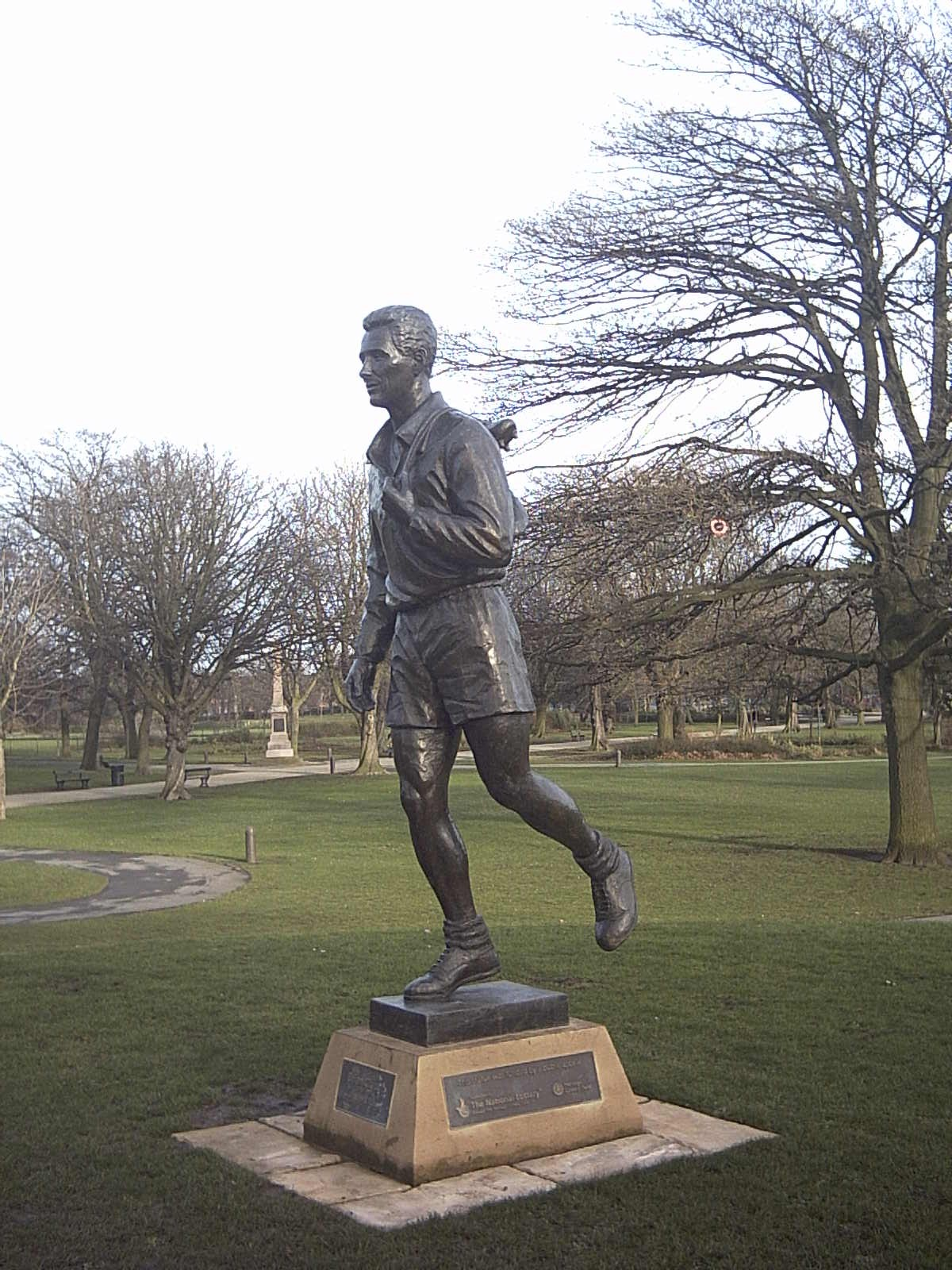
Mallock's Statue of Brian Clough in Albert Park, Middlesbrough
