= Denise Dutton =

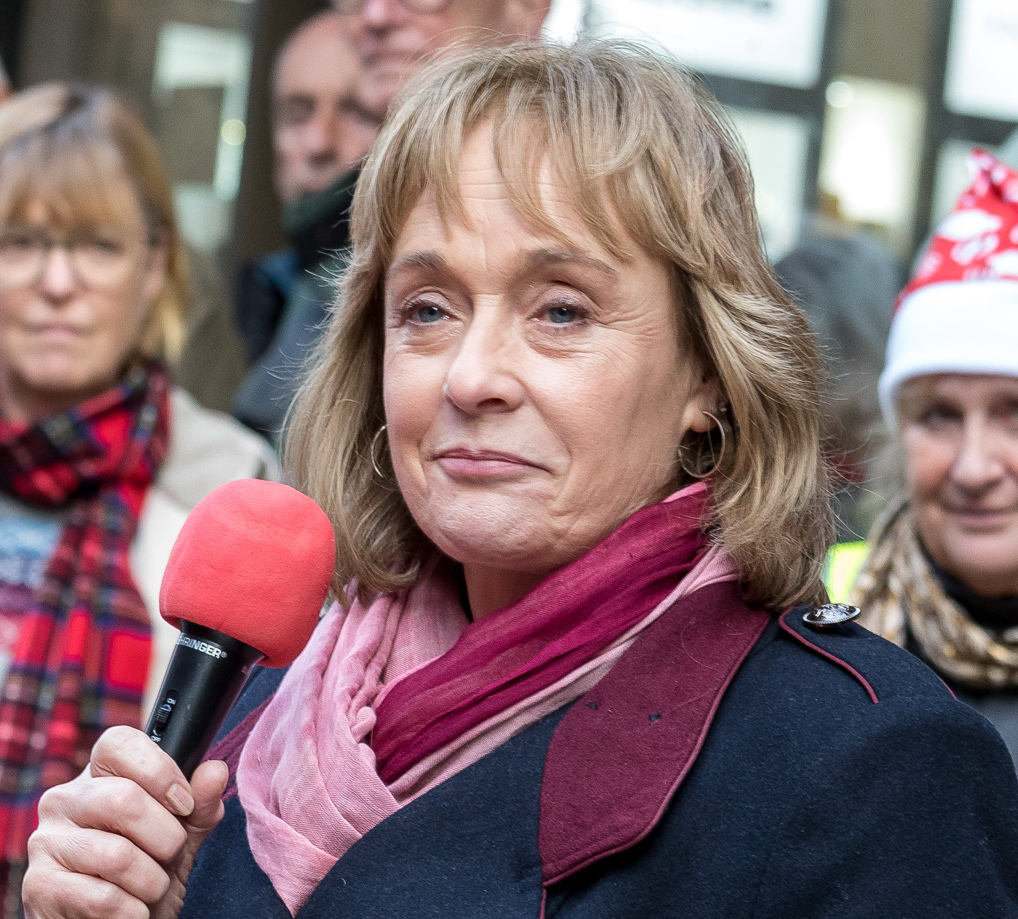
- in 2025
- Education: Anglia Ruskin University
- Occupation: sculptor
- Known for: statues of horses and women
- Website: Denise Dutton Sculpture

Denise Dutton is a British sculptor. Her public works include statues of the palaeontologist Mary Anning and the writer Sylvia Townsend Warner in Dorset

== Life ==
Dutton took an art foundation course at Cambridge College of Art and Technology before studying further at the Sir Henry Doulton School of Sculpture (both of these have since changed their names). She had an early passion for horses and she has used them frequently as a subject. In 2005 she collaborated with other sculptors to create The Fine Lady sculpture for Banbury where she focused on creating the horse.

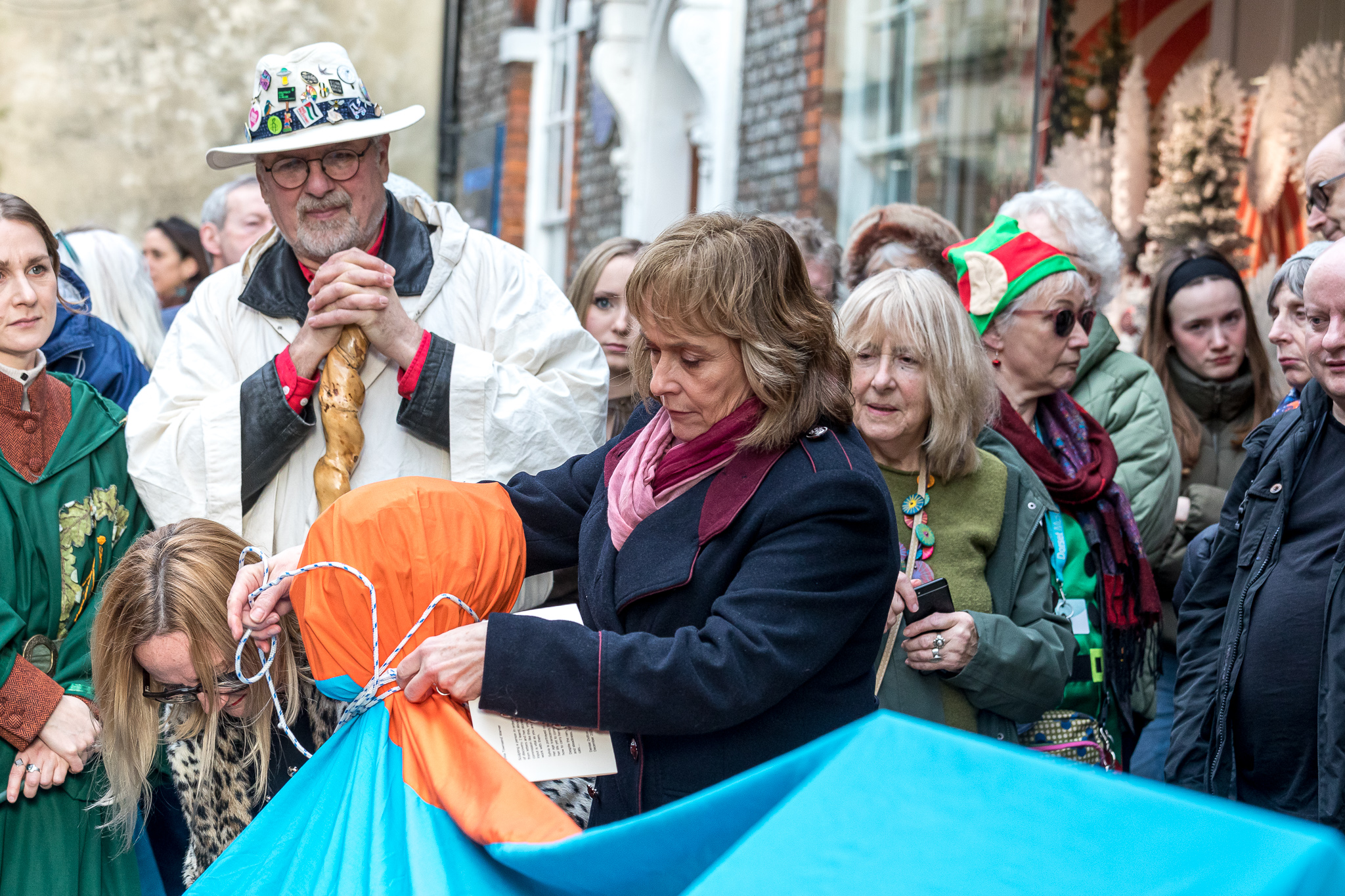
Denise Dutton and Anya Pearson begin to unveil the statue of Sylvia Townsend Warner in 2025

Her works include statues of the palaeontologist Mary Anning and the writer Sylvia Townsend Warner which are both in Dorset. Both of these were organised with the help of Visible Women UK. Dutton has worked on other leading British women including Annie Kenney who was the only working-class woman in the leadership of the suffragettes.

Dutton has a studio in Stoke-on-Trent which is where she created her sculpture of two Land Girls. This eight foot high sculpture is installed at the National Memorial Arboretum in Staffordshire. She also created the Lumber Jill statue for the same site.

She has also worked on leading male figures including Maharajah Duleep Singh who was a political prisoner in Victorian times, William Cavendish and the writer and weaver Ben Brierley.
