= 1907 North West Staffordshire by-election =

UK parliamentary by-election

← 1906	31 July 1907	Jan. 1910 →

Candidate	Stanley	Twyford
Party	Liberal	Conservative
Popular vote	7,396	5,047
Percentage	59.4%	40.6%
MP before election
Alfred Billson
Liberal
Subsequent MP
Albert Stanley
Liberal

The 1907 North West Staffordshire by-election was a Parliamentary by-election held on 31 July 1907. The constituency returned one Member of Parliament (MP) to the House of Commons of the United Kingdom, elected by the first past the post voting system.

== Vacancy ==
The by-election was caused by the death of Sir Alfred Billson on 9 July 1907. He had been Liberal MP for the seat of North West Staffordshire since the 1906 general election. In June 1907 he was knighted in King Edward VII's Birthday Honours List although he did not live to receive the accolade. He died suddenly in the House of Commons when he collapsed in the 'Aye' lobby while casting his vote on sugar duty legislation, aged 68.

== Electoral history ==
The seat had been gained by the Liberals in 1906. At the previous four elections a Conservative had won and a Liberal had not previously won since 1885, before the party split over Irish Home Rule.

Alfred Billson

General election 1906: North West Staffordshire
Party	Candidate	Votes	%	±%
Liberal	Alfred Billson	7,667	58.0	+15.5
Conservative	James Heath	5,557	42.0	−15.5
Majority		2,110	16.0	N/A
Turnout		13,224	85.8	+12.0
Liberal gain from Conservative		Swing	+15.5	

== Candidates ==
- The previous Conservative MP who Billson had defeated in 1906, Sir James Heath, now aged 55, declined an offer to contest the seat for his party, so the Conservatives chose 58-year-old local man Thomas Twyford as their candidate. He was Chairman of Twyfords of Hanley, Staffordshire, who built bathroom fittings. In 1906 he served as High Sheriff of Staffordshire. He was standing for parliament for the first time.
- The local Liberal Association selected 44-year-old Albert Stanley, another local man, to defend the seat. He was Secretary of the Midland Counties Miners' Federation. He was also standing for parliament for the first time. He did have some experience as a candidate having been elected to Staffordshire County Council. His candidature was sponsored by the Midland Counties Miners' Federation who agreed to fund his campaign.
- A third candidate, a Mr Hunnable, declared his candidature. However, when the deadline came for submitting nominations, there was none for him.

== Campaign ==
Polling Day was fixed for the 31 July 1907, just 22 days after the death of the previous MP, making for a very short campaign. Twyford, the Conservative candidate, was a supporter of tariff reform. He sought to attract votes from local miners by claiming he supported their campaign for an eight-hour working day. Stanley, the Liberal candidate supported free trade and Irish Home Rule. He hoped to win the backing of the overwhelming majority of the 5,000 miners living in the constituency. Stanley's campaign was supported by a number of Liberal MPs including those sponsored by trade unions. He did not receive any help from Labour Party MPs.

== Result ==
The Liberals held the seat and managed a slightly increased majority;

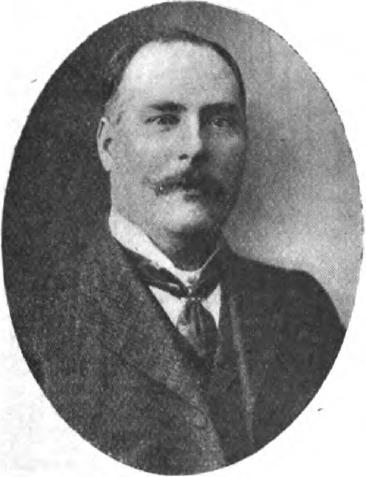
Albert Stanley

1907 North West Staffordshire by-election
Party	Candidate	Votes	%	±%
Liberal	Albert Stanley	7,396	59.4	+1.4
Conservative	Thomas Twyford	5,047	40.6	−1.4
Majority		2,349	18.8	+2.8
Turnout		12,443	79.1	−6.7
Liberal hold		Swing	+1.4	

Stanley attributed his victory to the "perfect union" of Liberal and Labour forces. Twyford blamed his defeat on his failure to attract miners' votes.

== Aftermath ==
Stanley was opposed to the miners affiliating to the Labour Party. When in 1909 the Miners Federation of Great Britain voted to affiliate, although a lifelong Liberal, he agreed to seek re-election as a Labour Party candidate.

General election January 1910: North West Staffordshire
Party	Candidate	Votes	%	±%
Labour	Albert Stanley	8,566	59.8	+0.4
Conservative	Gilbert Nugent	5,754	40.2	−0.4
Majority		2,812	19.6	+0.8
Turnout		14,320	86.8	+7.8
Labour hold		Swing	+0.4	
