= Frederick Dean =

Frederick or Fred Dean may refer to:

== Sports ==
- Frederick Dean (rugby union) (1880–1946), Cornish rugby union player
- Fred Dean (1952–2020), American football defensive end
- Fred Dean (offensive lineman) (born 1955), American football guard
- Fred Dean (Australian footballer) (1909–1989), Australian rules footballer

== Other ==
- Frederick Dean (SA Navy) (1900–1983), South African military commander
- Frederick James Dean (1868–1941), British trade unionist
