= Walter French =

Walter French may refer to:

- Walter French (baseball) (1899–1984), American outfielder, football halfback and baseball coach
- Walter French (cricket umpire) (before 1905–1961), Australian cricket umpire
- Walter John French (1868–1937), British trade unionist and politician
- Walter M. French, justice of the Washington Supreme Court

== See also ==
- French (surname)
