= Rowlinson =

Rowlinson is a surname. Notable people with the surname include:

- Ernest Rowlinson (1882–1941), British politician
- George Henry Rowlinson (1852–1937), British trade unionist
- Gerard Rowlinson (born 1941), British swimmer
- John Shipley Rowlinson (1926–2018), British chemist
- Matthew Rowlinson (born 1956), Canadian academic
- Norman Rowlinson (1923–2006), English football chairman
