= Albert Stanley =

Albert Stanley may refer to:

- Albert Stanley (Liberal politician) (1863–1915), British Member of Parliament, 1907–1915
- Albert Stanley, 1st Baron Ashfield (1874–1948), British Conservative MP, Managing Director & Chairman of the Underground Electric Railways Company of London; Chairman of London Passenger Transport Board
