= Henry Rust =

British trade unionist

Henry Rust (5 May 1831 – 29 May 1902) was a British trade unionist.

Born in Stroud, Rust began working on canal boats when he was nine years old. Four years later, he moved to Oldbury, where he became a miner. He joined the Primitive Methodist church, serving for many years as a lay preacher and Sunday school teacher for the church.

Rust was involved in numerous attempts to found local trade unions for miners. In 1863, lasting lodges were formed in Bilston and Willenhall, and this soon led to the foundation of the West Bromwich Miners' Association. His participation led to victimisation, and after he took a leading role in a strike, in 1874, he was unable to find employment in the mines, instead running a small shop and working as an insurance agent. Despite this, he remained a trustee of the West Bromwich Miners.

Rust supported the Liberal Party, and campaigned heavily for Benjamin Hingley, who won the North Worcestershire seat at the 1885 general election. By this time, the West Bromwich Miners' Association was in decline. In response, Rust increased his involved, becoming vice-chair of the local wages board in 1889, and in 1890 becoming the union's agent and secretary. By this time, Rust had become convinced that a sliding scale was needed, where miners' wages automatically rose and fell with the price of coal. The Midland Counties Miners' Federation took the opposite view, so Rust led the West Bromwich Miners out of the federation.

Rust stood down as agent of the West Bromwich Miners in 1894, due to illness. He died in 1902.

Trade union offices
Preceded by Samuel Henry Whitehouse	General Secretary of the West Bromwich Miners' Association; 1890–1894	Succeeded by Thomas Mansell
