= Henry Rust (disambiguation) =

Henry Rust was a British trade unionist.

Henry Rust may also refer to:

- Henry M. Rust (died 1861), American state senator in Kentucky
- Henry Rust Mighels, American Union Army commanding officer from Maine

== See also ==
- Henry Ruste, Canadian politician from Alberta
