= North West Staffordshire =

Parliamentary constituency in the United Kingdom, 1885–1918

- Former county constituency for the House of Commons

1885–1918
- Seats: one
- Created from: North Staffordshire and West Staffordshire
- Replaced by: Stone and Stafford

North West Staffordshire was a constituency in Staffordshire which returned one Member of Parliament (MP) to the House of Commons of the Parliament of the United Kingdom. Elections were held using the first past the post voting system.

== History ==
The constituency was created for the 1885 general election, and abolished for the 1918 general election.

== Members of Parliament ==
Election	Member	Party
1885	George Leveson-Gower	Liberal
1886	Justinian Edwards-Heathcote	Conservative
1892	James Heath	Conservative
1906	Alfred Billson	Liberal
1907	Albert Stanley	Liberal
1910	Albert Stanley	Labour
1916	Samuel Finney	Labour
1918	constituency abolished	

== Election results ==
=== Elections in the 1880s ===
General election 1885: North West Staffordshire
Party	Candidate	Votes	%	±%
Liberal	George Leveson-Gower	5,757	54.9	
Conservative	Justinian Edwards-Heathcote	4,720	45.1	
Majority		1,037	9.8	
Turnout		10,477	79.2	'
Registered electors		13,222		
Liberal win (new seat)				

Leveson-Gower was appointed Lord Commissioner of the Treasury, requiring a by-election.

By-election, 12 Feb 1886: North West Staffordshire
Party	Candidate	Votes	%	±%
Liberal	George Leveson-Gower	Unopposed		
Liberal hold				

General election 1886: North West Staffordshire
Party	Candidate	Votes	%	±%
Conservative	Justinian Edwards-Heathcote	5,252	54.1	+9.0
Liberal	George Leveson-Gower	4,459	45.9	−9.0
Majority		793	8.2	N/A
Turnout		9,711	73.4	−5.8
Registered electors		13,222		
Conservative gain from Liberal		Swing	+9.0	

=== Elections in the 1890s ===
James Heath

General election 1892: North West Staffordshire
Party	Candidate	Votes	%	±%
Conservative	James Heath	5,638	51.1	−3.0
Liberal	Leonard Shoobridge	5,406	48.9	+3.0
Majority		232	2.2	−6.0
Turnout		11,044	78.8	+5.4
Registered electors		14,011		
Conservative hold		Swing	−3.0	

General election 1895: North West Staffordshire
Party	Candidate	Votes	%	±%
Conservative	James Heath	6,206	52.8	+1.7
Liberal	Leonard Shoobridge	5,538	47.2	−1.7
Majority		668	5.6	+3.4
Turnout		11,744	80.1	+1.3
Registered electors		14,657		
Conservative hold		Swing	+1.7	

=== Elections in the 1900s ===
General election 1900: North West Staffordshire
Party	Candidate	Votes	%	±%
Conservative	James Heath	6,205	57.5	+4.7
Liberal	James Lovatt	4,594	42.5	−4.7
Majority		1,611	15.0	+9.4
Turnout		10,799	73.8	−6.3
Registered electors		14,626		
Conservative hold		Swing	+4.7	

Alfred Billson

General election 1906: North West Staffordshire
Party	Candidate	Votes	%	±%
Liberal	Alfred Billson	7,667	58.0	+15.5
Conservative	James Heath	5,557	42.0	−15.5
Majority		2,110	16.0	N/A
Turnout		13,224	85.8	+12.0
Registered electors		15,404		
Liberal gain from Conservative		Swing	+15.5	

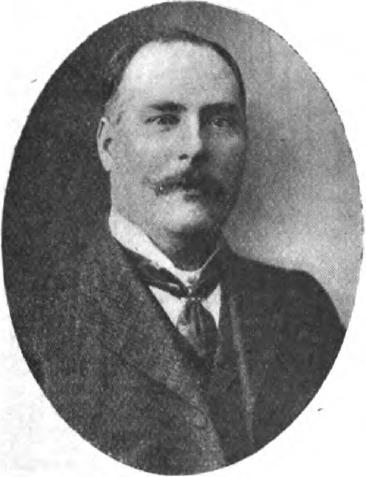
Albert Stanley

1907 North West Staffordshire by-election
Party	Candidate	Votes	%	±%
Lib-Lab	Albert Stanley	7,396	59.4	+1.4
Conservative	Thomas Twyford	5,047	40.6	−1.4
Majority		2,349	18.8	+2.8
Turnout		12,443	79.1	−6.7
Registered electors		15,738		
Lib-Lab hold		Swing	+1.4	

=== Elections in the 1910s ===
General election January 1910: North West Staffordshire
Party	Candidate	Votes	%	±%
Labour	Albert Stanley	8,566	59.8	N/A
Conservative	Gilbert Nugent	5,754	40.2	−1.8
Majority		2,812	19.6	+3.6
Turnout		14,320	86.8	+1.0
Registered electors		16,498		
Labour hold		Swing	+1.8	

General election December 1910: North West Staffordshire
Party	Candidate	Votes	%	±%
Labour	Albert Stanley	8,125	62.2	+2.4
Conservative	Leslie de Gruyther	4,940	37.8	−2.4
Majority		3,185	24.4	+4.8
Turnout		13,065	79.2	−7.6
Registered electors		16,498		
Labour hold		Swing	+2.4	

General Election 1914–15:

Another General Election was required to take place before the end of 1915. The political parties had been making preparations for an election to take place and by July 1914, the following candidates had been selected;

- Labour: Albert Stanley
- Unionist:

1916 North West Staffordshire by-election
Party	Candidate	Votes	%	±%
Labour	Samuel Finney	Unopposed		
Labour hold				
