= Shoobridge =

Shoobridge may refer to:

- Leonard Shoobridge
- The various members of the Tasmanian political family:
- Ebenezer Shoobridge (1820–1901), member of the Tasmanian Legislative Council (1882–1886)
- William Shoobridge (1846–1940), son of Ebenezer, member of the Tasmanian House of Assembly (1916–1919, 1922–1928, 1929–1931)
- Vincent Shoobridge (1872–1948), son of William, member of the Tasmanian House of Assembly (1940–1941)
- Louis Shoobridge Sr. (1851–1939), son of Ebenezer, member of the Tasmanian Legislative Council (1921–1937)
- Rupert Shoobridge (1883–1962), son of Louis Sr., member of the Tasmanian Legislative Council (1937–1955)
- Louis Shoobridge Jr. (1920–2005), son of Rupert, member of the Tasmanian Legislative Council (1968–1971)
