= Maurice Ingram =

British diplomat

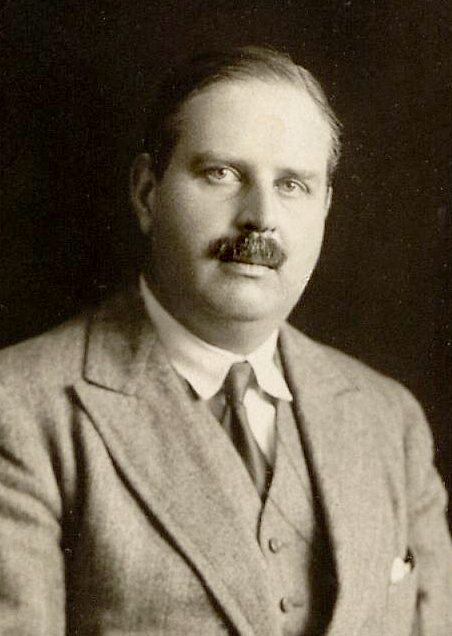
Edward Ingram.

Edward Maurice Berkeley Ingram CMG, OBE (14 December 1890 – 11 May 1941) was a British diplomat and civil servant.

== Background and education ==
Ingram was the son of Major Edward Richard Berkeley Ingram (1850–95), 2nd Battalion, Welsh Regiment (41st Regiment), and Laura Maria Chennell Ingram (1850–1943), daughter of Thomas B. Shoobridge and Anna Maria Chennell, of Tenterden, Kent. He was a first cousin, once removed, of the writer Leonard Shoobridge (Ingram's grandfather's brother was the father of Leonard). He began his education at St Davids School, Reigate, Surrey (a boarding school), went on to Eton from 1904 to 1907, and Hubert Brinton's House from September 1904 until Easter 1909, and King's College, Cambridge from 1909 to 1913.

== Career ==
During the First World War Ingram served as a captain on the General Staff at the War Office and was appointed an Officer of the Order of the British Empire (OBE) in 1918. After the war he entered the Foreign Office and Diplomatic Service in 1919, where he acted as private secretary to Sir Arthur Steel-Maitland and Sir Hamar Greenwood (when they were additional Parliamentary Under Secretaries for Foreign Affairs). He served as Assistant Secretary to Lord Milner's mission to Egypt and as Lord Milner's private secretary, was appointed Second Secretary in 1920, First Secretary in 1924 and was posted to Oslo in 1925. In 1927, he transferred to the Foreign Office as Chief Clerk of the News Department.

Between 1926 and 1934 Ingram was chargé d'affaires in Berlin, then chargé d'affaires in the legation in Peking, and was appointed full Counsellor in Peking while resident in Shanghai and Nanjing (the latter place was where the Chinese Government was resident). He was appointed a Companion of the Order of St Michael and St George (CMG) in 1934. Between 1935 and 1937 he was chargé d'affaires in Rome, after which he returned to the Foreign Office. In 1939 he joined the Ministry of Economic Warfare as diplomatic adviser, taking charge of the foreign relations side of the policy of blockade against Nazi Germany.

== Personal life ==
Ingram was a friend of Edward Joseph Dent, Glyn Philpot, Sir Arthur Colefax and his wife Lady Sibyl Colefax, Alvary Gascoigne, Lord Gladwyn, Lord Greenwood, Lord Killearn and Sir Frederick Whyte.

He was killed in May 1941, aged 50, by enemy action whilst fire watching from his home at 56 Curzon Street, Westminster during the German Blitz on London. An obituary appeared in The Times of London. His funeral was held at Albury Church, Much Hadham, Hertfordshire, and a memorial service was held at St Margaret's Church, Westminster In 1943, money was invested to establish The Maurice Ingram Trust whose purposes were (1) "a boy or girl from the Albury School to help with books, clothing or fees on going to the secondary school" (2) assist with local Sunday school expenses (3) beautification of local church surrounds.
