= Estonians in the United Kingdom =

Ethnic group in the United Kingdom

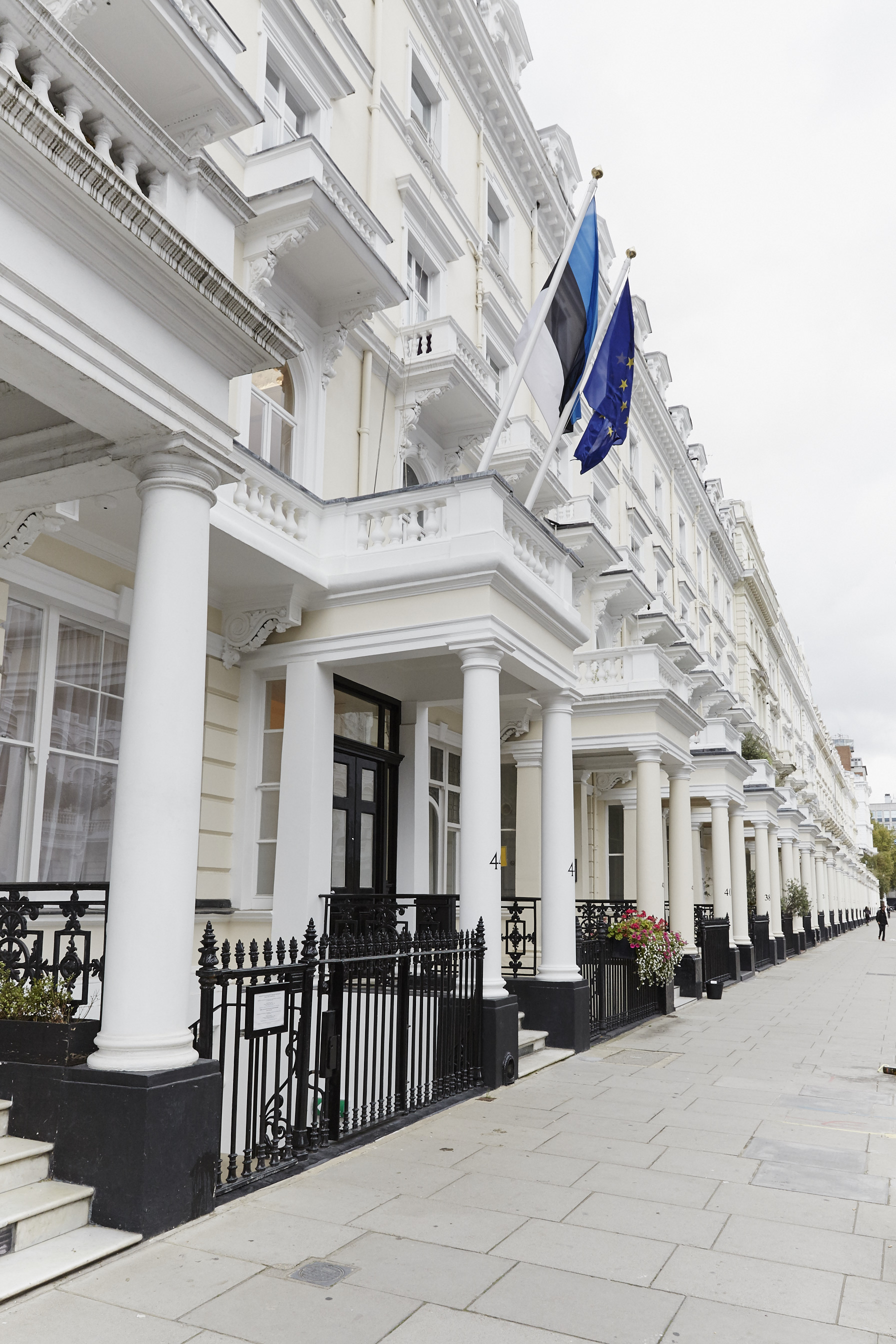
- Estonian Embassy in London

Total population
- Estonian-born residents in the United Kingdom: 10,000–15,000 (2021/22 Census) (Note: Does not include ethnic Estonians born in the United Kingdom or those with Estonian ancestry); England: 6,411-1,411 (2021); Scotland: 5,000 (2022); Wales: 3,000 (2021); Northern Ireland: 589 (2021)

Regions with significant populations
- London, Birmingham, Manchester, Belfast, Kingston upon Hull, York, Kings Lynn and Glasgow

Languages
- English, Estonian, Russian.

Religion
- Christianity · Judaism • Protestantism

Related ethnic groups
- Finns in the United Kingdom, Swedes in the United Kingdom, Balts

Estonians in the United Kingdom are those born or raised in the UK, or residents, who are of ethnically Estonian descent or originate from Estonia, a country in North-Eastern Europe.

== History, population and settlement ==
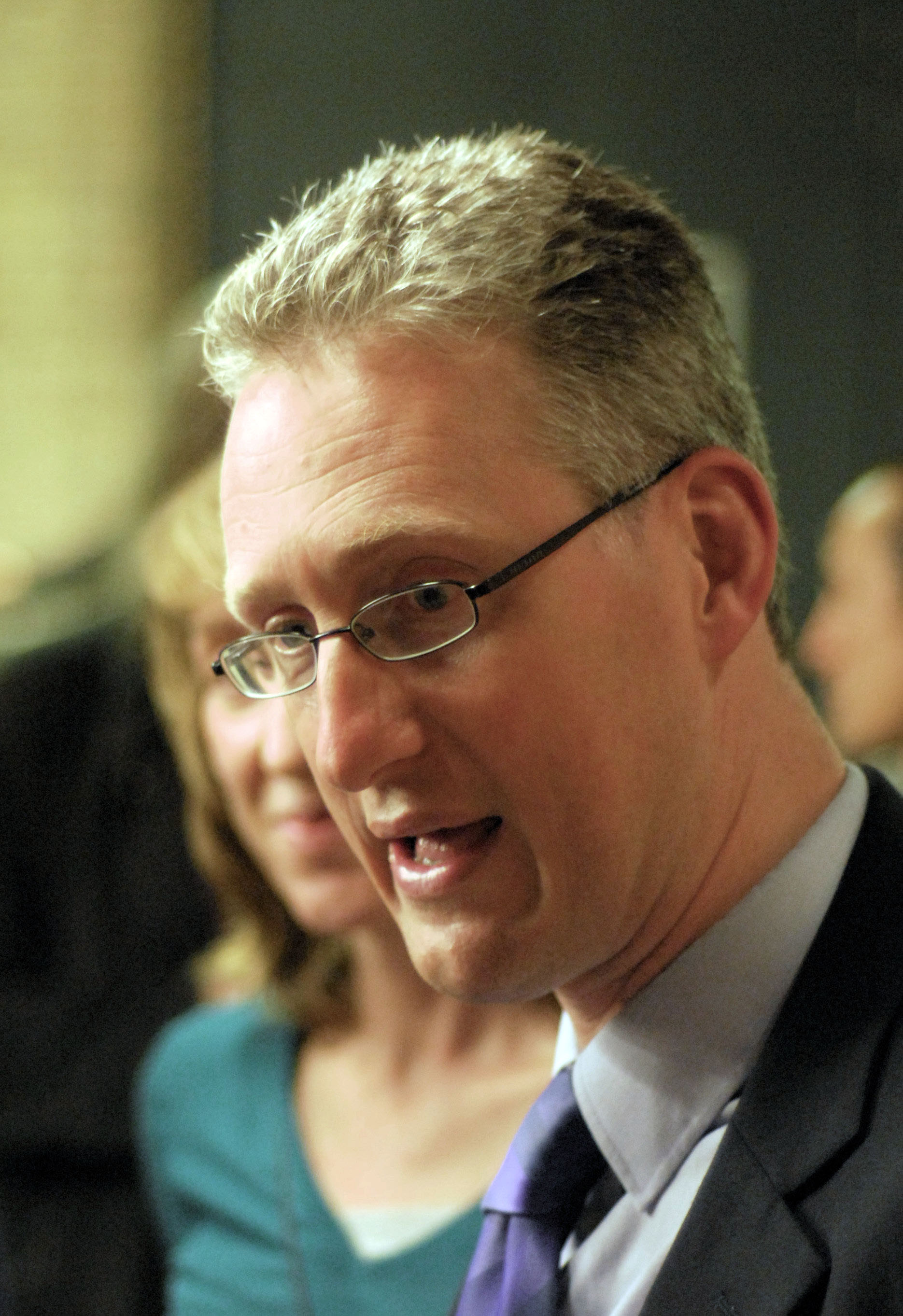
Lembit Öpik, British politician from Northern Ireland and Wales of Estonian origin

In the early 20th century, Estonian workers began to settle in industrial cities like Glasgow and Bristol. Notable groups of Estonian-born migrants historically also included people of Estonian Jewish, Baltic German and Estonian Russian origin.

An estimated 10,000-15,000 Estonian citizens live in the UK, about 3,000-5,000 of them in London. The most active communities are in London, Bradford and Leicester. There is a total of 13 Estonian societies in the UK, the oldest being the London Estonian Society established in 1921. Organisations for Estonians include an Estonian School, Estonian Houses in London, Bradford and Leicester and the Association of Estonians in Great Britain. In 1947, the Estonian émigré writer and journalist Gert Helbemäe moved to London, and established the newspaper Eesti Hääl, which is currently published monthly.

It is possible to study Estonian as an elective through the School of Slavonic and East European Studies (SSES) at University College London. With support and help of the Estonian Embassy, the Estonian School in London opened in 2009, which offers supplementary Estonian language education to children.

== See also ==
- Estonia–United Kingdom relations
- Estonian diaspora
- Immigration to the United Kingdom
