= Warwickshire Miners' Association =

Trade union representing coal miners in Warwickshire

- Founded: 1885
- Headquarters: Miners' Offices, Bedworth
- Location: United Kingdom
- Members: 9,000 (1907)
- Parent organization: Miners' Federation of Great Britain

The Warwickshire Miners' Association was a trade union representing coal miners in the Warwickshire area of England.

In 1885, the Newdegate family leased their Warwickshire coal mine to a Sheffield-based company, who attempted to cut costs by reducing miners' wages. This prompted miners to strike, and afterwards they formed the Warwickshire and Stafford Miners' Trade Union, which was later renamed as the "Warwickshire Miners' Association". The union's first secretary was William Johnson, who later became a local Member of Parliament.

In 1889, the union was a founder constituent of the Miners' Federation of Great Britain (MFGB). In about 1892, it affiliated to the Midland Counties Miners' Federation, with Johnson becoming treasurer of the federation. The MFGB voted to affiliate to the Labour Party in 1909, but Johnson and the Warwickshire Miners refused to follow suit. This led to a series of disputes, and in 1912 a group of members including Walter John French split away to form the rival North Warwickshire Miners' Association. George Henry Jones became secretary of the North Warwickshire Miners, but moved to the Warwickshire Miners in 1919, and two years later was able to persuade the North Warwickshire Miners to rejoin the original union.

At its peak, the union had 11,000 members, in 25 branches.

The MFGB became the National Union of Mineworkers in 1944, and the Warwickshire Miners' Association became its Warwickshire District (Midlands Area), with less autonomy than before.

== General Secretaries ==
1885: William Johnson
1917: William Johnson, Jr
1919: George Henry Jones
1947: A. J. Pratt
1960s: Vivian Francis
1970s: Dick Storer
