= Queen's Gate Terrace =

Street in London

Coordinates: 51°29′55.54″N 0°10′51.51″W

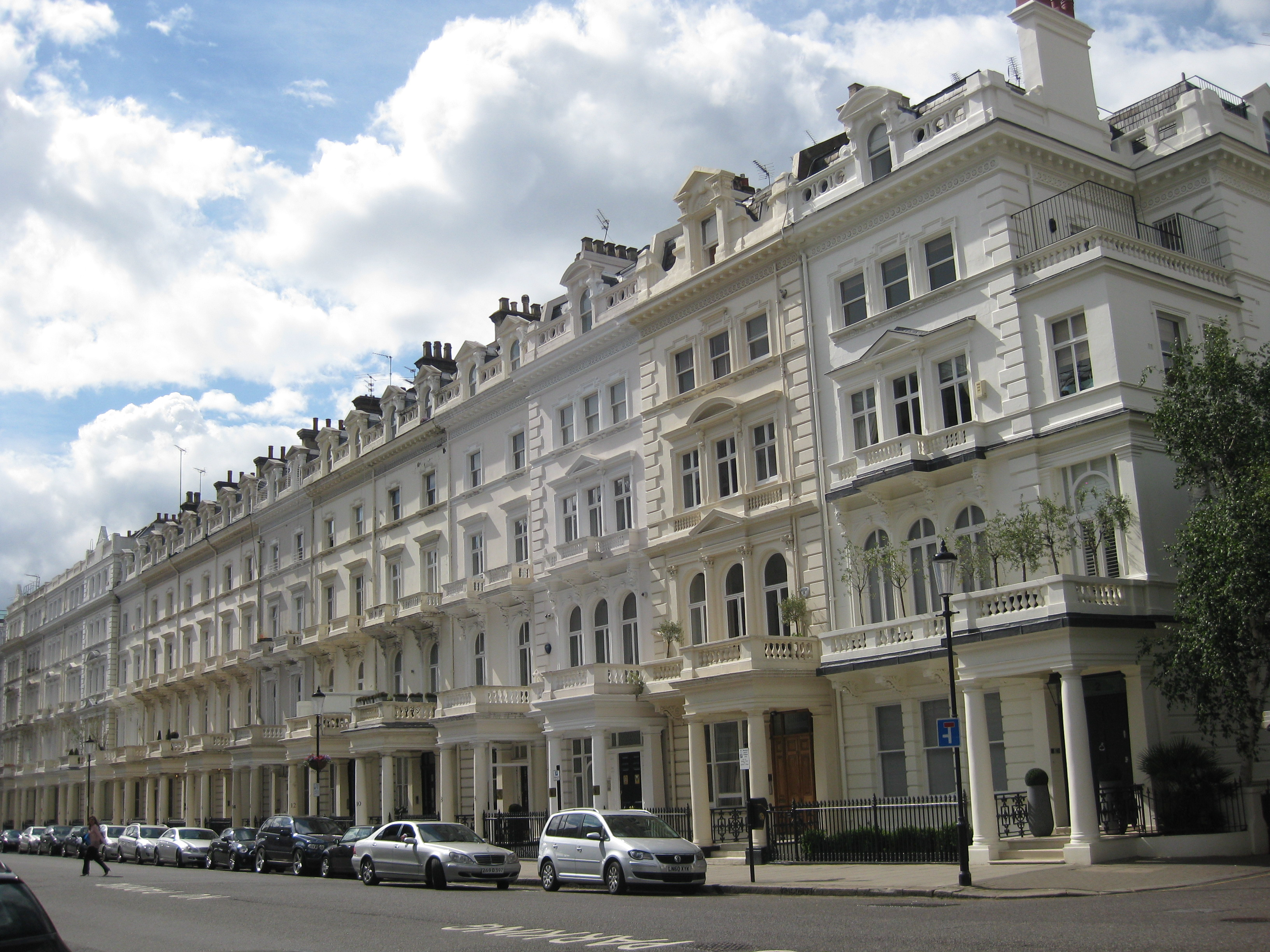
Queen's Gate Terrace

Queen's Gate Terrace is a street in Kensington, London, in the Royal Borough of Kensington and Chelsea, home to several embassies. The street runs west to east from Gloucester Road to Queen's Gate.

C Aldin or William Harris were the architects for many of the houses.

In 1886, the politician James Bailey purchased the South Kensington Hotel, in Queen's Gate Terrace.

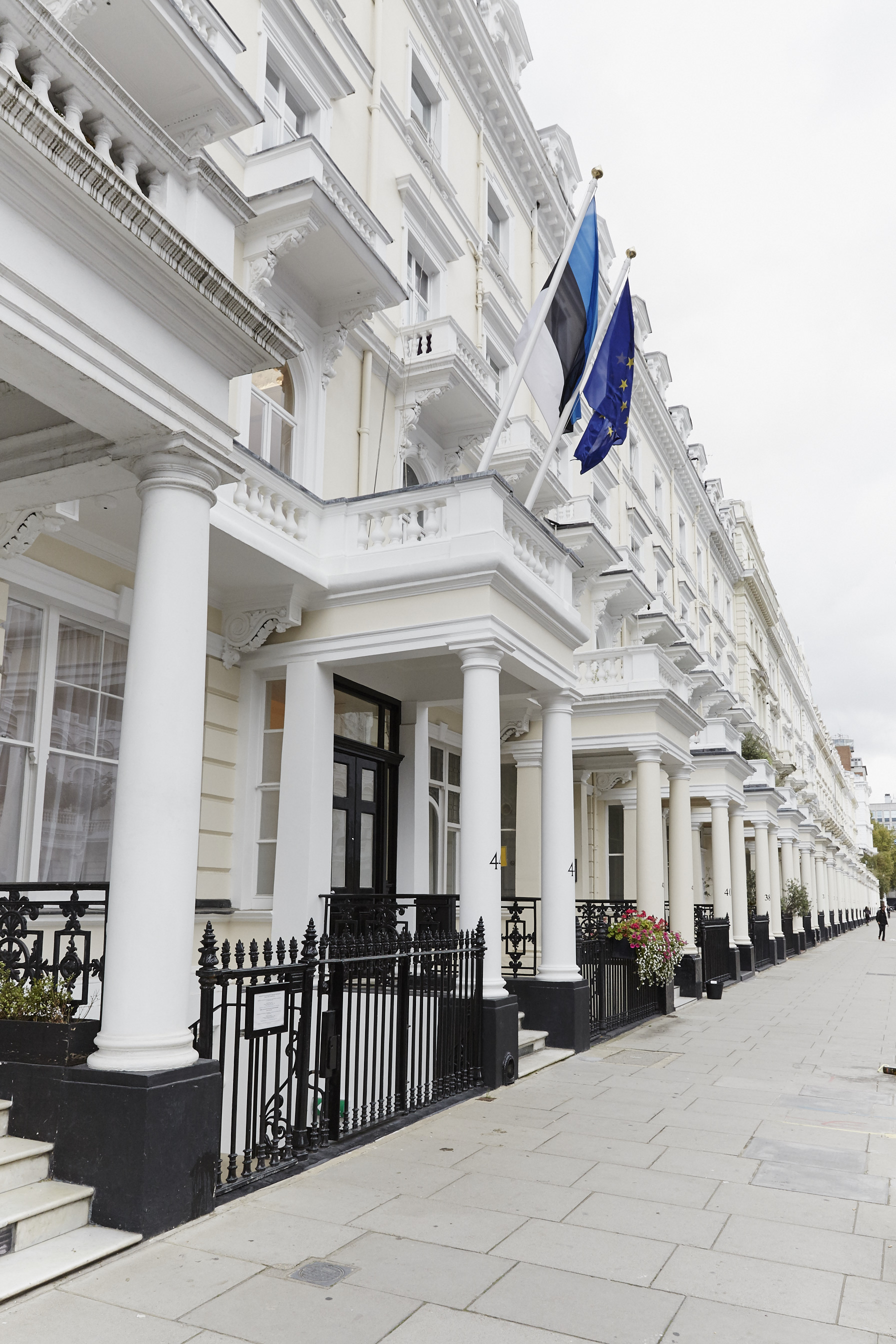
Estonian Embassy, 44 Queen's Gate Terrace

The Embassy of Estonia is at no 44. The UAE Embassy's Military Department is at no 6. The Embassy of France's Paymaster & Financial Comptroller Section is at no 30.

== Notable people ==
Leonard Shoobridge (1858–1935), writer, archaeologist, poet and politician, grew up at no 40.

== See also ==
- 56–58 Queen's Gate Terrace
