= Old Hill Miners' Association =

The Old Hill and Highley District Miners', Enginemen's and Surfacemen's Association, usually known as the Old Hill Miners' Association, was a trade union representing mineworkers in the Old Hill district of the West Midlands, in England.

Old Hill was the last area of the South Staffordshire coalfield to be developed, and the local mining industry was growing when the miners' union was established, in 1870. It soon became known for its militant approach, often striking in order to raise wages or improve working conditions. Unlike other local unions, it refused to take part in the South Staffordshire and East Worcestershire Miners' Wages Board, which took a sliding scale approach to wage - they would automatically rise and fall with the price of coal. This approach was vindicated in 1884, when the board reduced wages, but miners came out on strike, with the backing of the Old Hill union, but the opposition of other local unions. As a result, the strike was lost, and in search of solidarity from workers in other industries, the union affiliated to the Midland Counties Trades Federation (MCTF).

The MCTF was focused on the metal trades, and so the Old Hill Miners' Association switched to the Midland Counties Miners' Federation when that was formed, in 1886. Unlike the other local miners' unions, it participated enthusiastically in the federation. It briefly left after the federation affiliated to the Miners' Federation of Great Britain in 1889, but soon rejoined. As a result, when all the other local unions merged into the West Bromwich Miners' Association, Old Hill remained independent. Despite this, it was always a small union; by 1910, it had 1,116 members.

In 1944, the National Union of Mineworkers was established, and the union became the Highley District of its Midlands Area. A couple of years later, it merged into the South Staffordshire and East Worcestershire District.

== General Secretaries ==
William Breakwell
1883: Benjamin Winwood
1912: Samuel Edwards
