= 56–58 Queen's Gate Terrace =

Grade II listed building in the Royal Borough of Kensington and Chelsea

Coordinates: 51.498780°N 0.183532°W

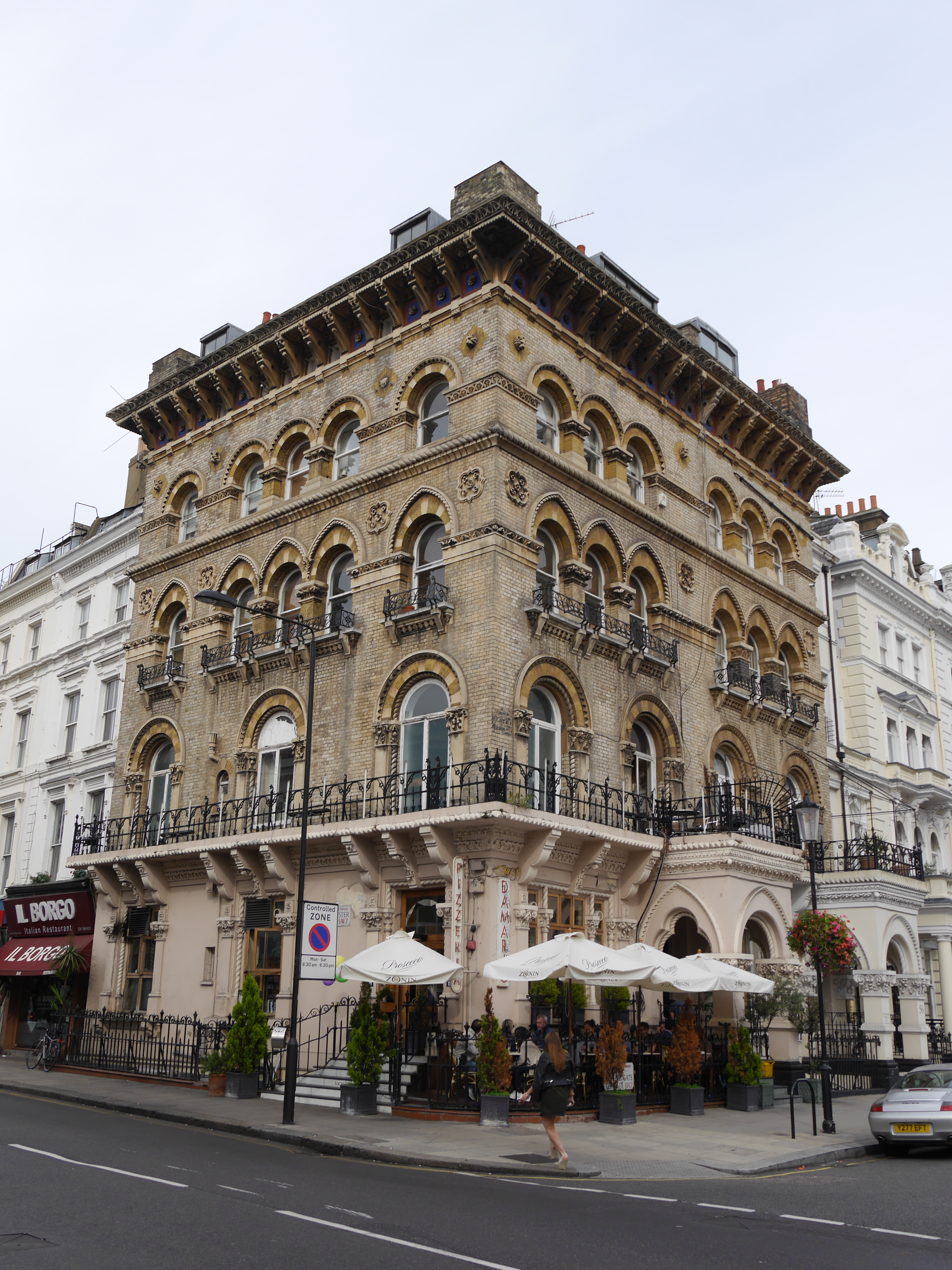
56–58 Queen's Gate Terrace, 2016

56–58 Queen's Gate Terrace is a pair of Grade II listed houses in Queen's Gate Terrace, Kensington, London SW7, built in 1863–65 by the architect Charles Gray.

The ground floor of number 58 also has an entrance on 15 Gloucester Road, and is occupied by the Da Mario Pizzeria.
