= William Whitefield =

British trade unionist

William Whitefield (4 January 1850 – 21 October 1926) was a British trade unionist.

Born near Newcastle-upon-Tyne, Whitefield became a coal miners at the age of ten. He became active in the Northumberland Miners' Association, and served as a checkweighman for seven years, then became a deputy. During this time, he undertook correspondence courses to educate himself.

The newly formed Bristol Miners' Association invited him to become their agent and secretary in 1889, and he took up the post there in June. He proved immediately successful, negotiating a 10% pay increase for union members. He served on the executive of the Miners' Federation of Great Britain (MFGB) on four occasions between 1889 and 1904.

Whitefield was asked to stand as a Liberal-Labour candidate in the 1890 Bristol East by-election, but was unable to finance a candidacy. However, he was elected to Bristol City Council in 1906, representing St George East until 1919. He then became an alderman until his death.

Trade union offices
Preceded by New position	Secretary of the Bristol Miners' Association; 1889 – 1921	Succeeded by Charles Gill
Preceded by Charles Ammon and Ernest Bevin	Trades Union Congress representative to the American Federation of Labour; 1916; With: Harry Gosling	Succeeded by Arthur Hayday and John Hill
