= Justinian Edwards-Heathcote =

British army officer and politician (1843–1928)

Captain Justinian Heathcote Edwards-Heathcote JP DL MP (17 June 1843 – 21 January 1928) was a British Conservative politician and soldier. A member of the Staffordshire gentry, he was the maternal grandfather of the fascist leader Oswald Mosley.

Heathcote was eldest son of Rev. Edward James Justinian Edwards and his wife, the former Elizabeth Anne Heathcote. His mother was the daughter and heiress of Richard Edensor Heathcote by his wife Lady Elizabeth Lindsay (daughter of the 6th Earl of Balcarres). Born in Trentham, Staffordshire, where his father was the vicar, Heathcote was educated at Winchester College before receiving a commission in the 63rd (West Suffolk) Regiment of Foot. From 1875, he was a captain in the Staffordshire Yeomanry.

He was married to Eleanor Stone (1844–1927; daughter of Spencer Stone, Esq., of Callingwood Hall, near Burton upon Trent, who was painted by Val Prinsep), with whom he had three children. On 5 March 1870, he succeeded to his uncle's estate and thus assumed by royal licence the surname of Heathcote.

Heathcote stood unsuccessfully for the Conservative Party in North West Staffordshire at the 1885 general election, but won the seat in 1886. He retired in 1892 to his estate of Apedale Hall, near Newcastle under Lyme, Staffordshire.

== See also ==
- Richard Edensor Heathcote
- John Edensor Heathcote

Parliament of the United Kingdom
Preceded by George Leveson-Gower	Member of Parliament for North West Staffordshire; 1886–1892	Succeeded by Sir James Heath, 1st Baronet
