= West Bromwich Miners' Association =

- West Bromwich, Oldbury, Tipton, Coseley and Bradley Amalgamated Association of Miners
- Founded: 1869
- Headquarters: Miners' Hall, Great Bridge, Tipton
- Location: England
- Members: 4,210 (1915)
- Parent organization: Amalgamated Association of Miners (1869–1875)
- Affiliations: Midland Miners (1886–1888; 1899 on)

The West Bromwich Miners' Association was a trade union representing coal miners in southern Staffordshire and eastern Worcestershire, in the United Kingdom.

The union brought together small miners' unions based in Bradley, Coseley, Oldbury, Tipton and West Bromwich, the oldest of which had been founded in either 1860 or 1863. It was established in 1869 as the West Bromwich, Oldbury, Tipton, Coseley and Bradley Amalgamated Association of Miners, linked with the new, national, Amalgamated Association of Miners (AAM), but was usually known by the shorter title of the "West Bromwich Miners' Association". During this period, George Henry Rowlinson served twice as president of the union.

The union's membership peaked at 3,105 in 1875, but it only just survived the collapse of the national AAM, membership falling to only 515 in 1881. An 1884 strike involving miners in many of the unions based in the West Midlands brought the union close to collapse. However, Samuel Henry Whitehouse became the union's agent, and in 1886 it became a founder constituent of the Midland Counties Miners' Federation, with Whitehouse becoming the federation's first secretary. The union saw a resurgence in membership, but Whitehouse left in 1888 and was replaced by Henry Rust, who withdrew the union from the federation, and also kept it outside the Miners' Federation of Great Britain (MFGB). Initially this strategy proved successful, membership reaching 2,218 again by 1892, but by 1898 it was struggling. The union was renamed as the South Staffordshire and East Worcestershire Amalgamated Association of Miners, and Thomas Mansell took over as secretary. In 1899, he brought the union back into the Midland Federation, and through it, also into membership of the MFGB. Membership peaked during World War I, hitting 4,210 in 1915, but then fell rapidly, declining to 1,031 in 1920.

In 1944, the MFGB became the more centralised National Union of Mineworkers, and the union became the South Staffordshire District of its Midlands Area. A couple of years later, it absorbed the Highley and Shropshire districts, and was renamed as the "South Staffs and Shropshire District". In 1979, following the closure of the Granville colliery, the last coal mine in the region, the district was dissolved, and its banner was laid up at Blists Hill.

== General Secretaries ==
1870s: Henry Barnes
1880s: Samuel Henry Whitehouse
1890: Henry Rust
1894: Thomas Mansell
1910s: H. Whitehouse
1940s: J. H. Southall
