= Estonia–United Kingdom relations =

Bilateral relations of Estonia and United Kingdom

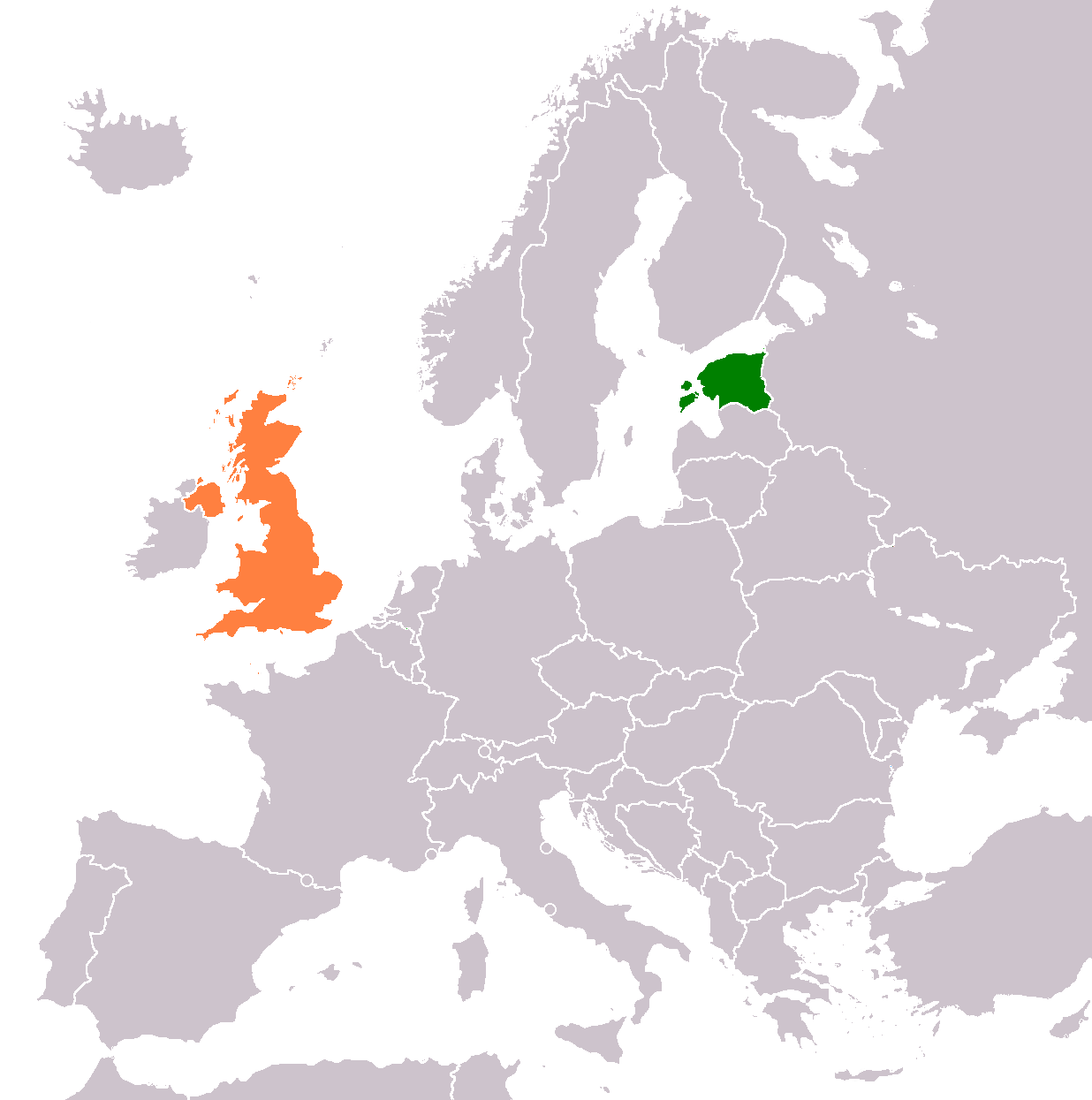

- Estonia: United Kingdom

Estonia and the United Kingdom are full members of the Council of Europe, NATO and Joint Expeditionary Force. The United Kingdom gave full support to Estonia's applications for membership in the European Union and NATO.

== History ==
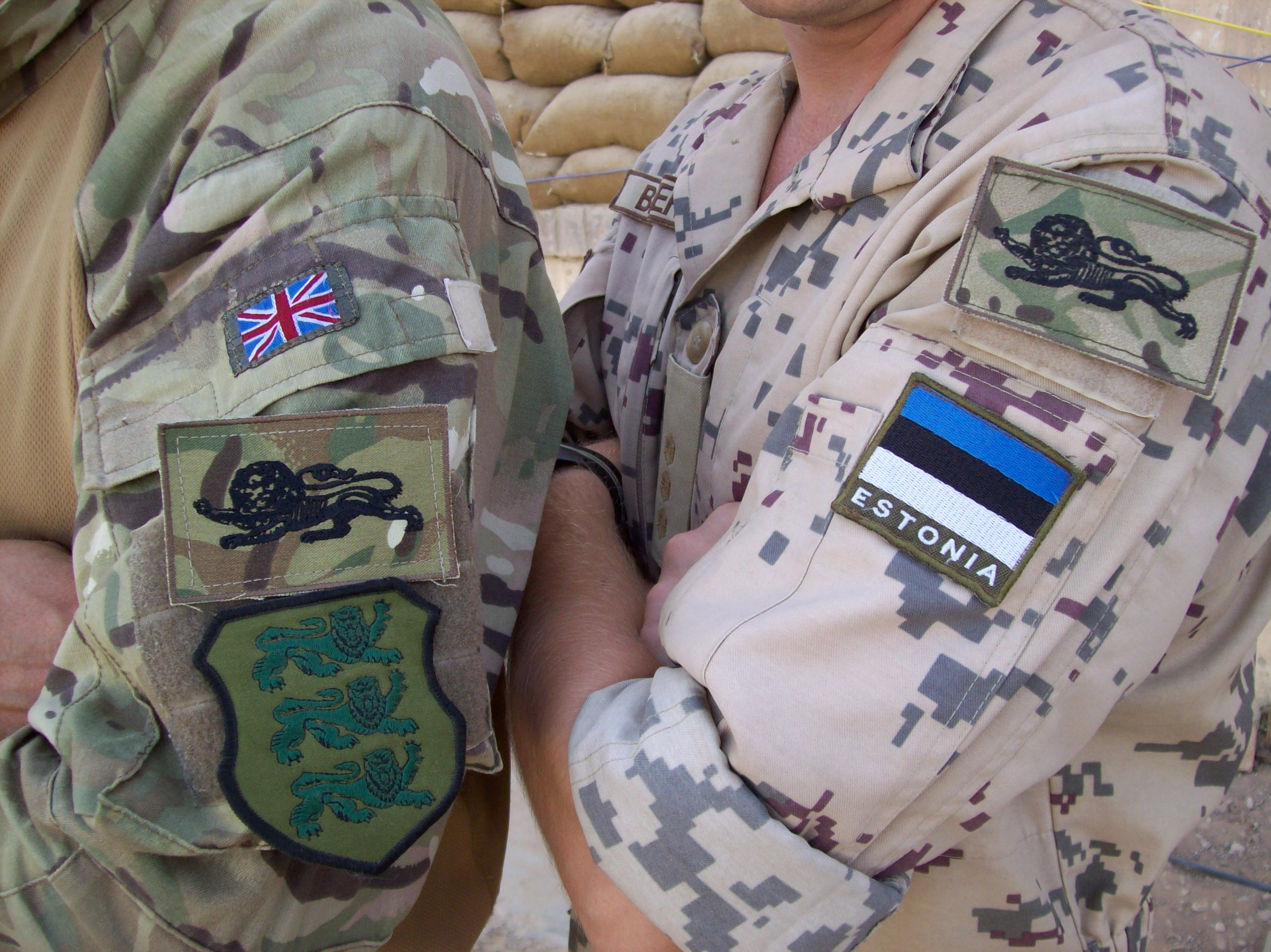
British and Estonian Soldiers in Afghanistan

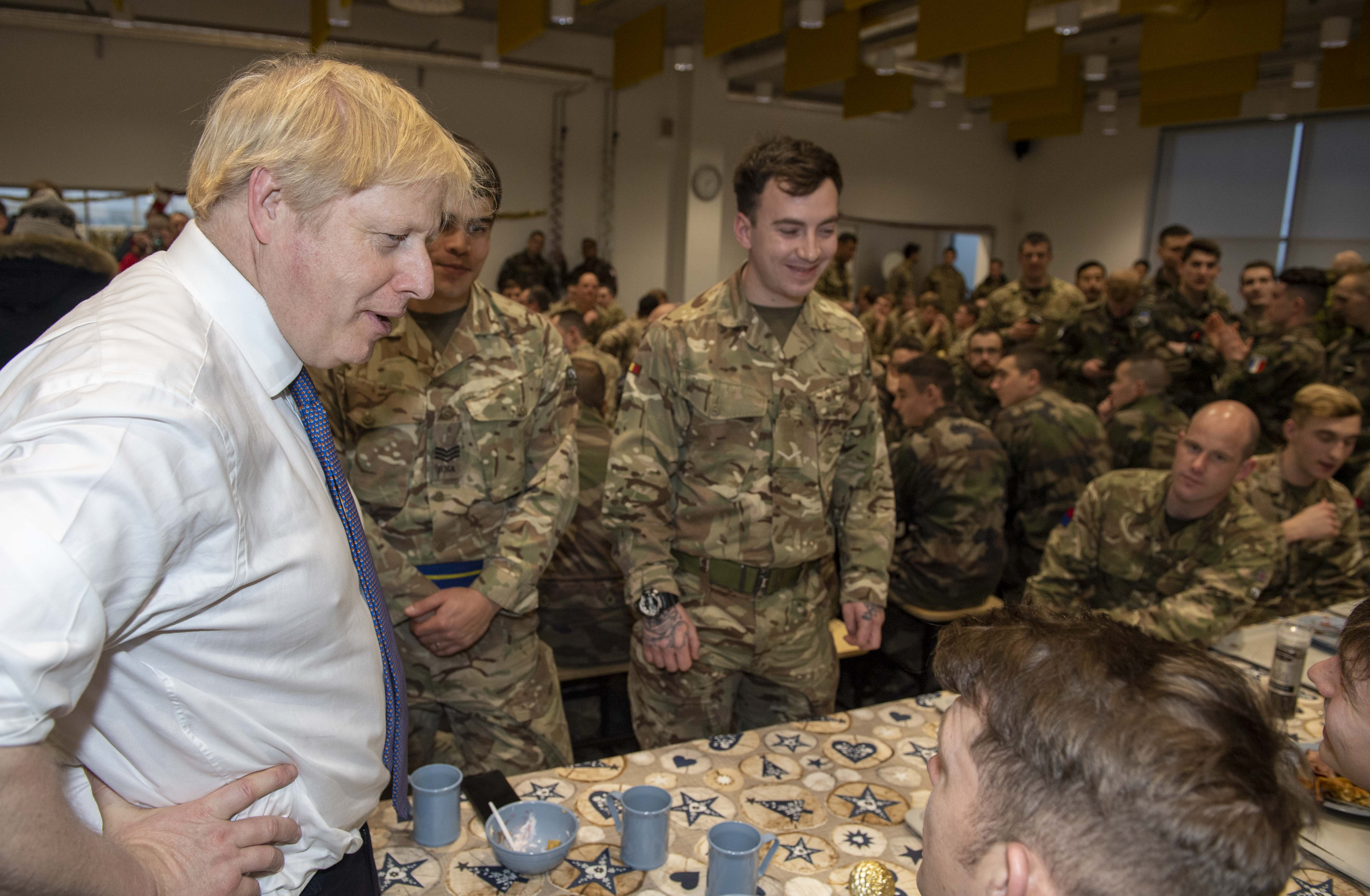
British Prime Minister Boris Johnson visits UK troops in Estonia

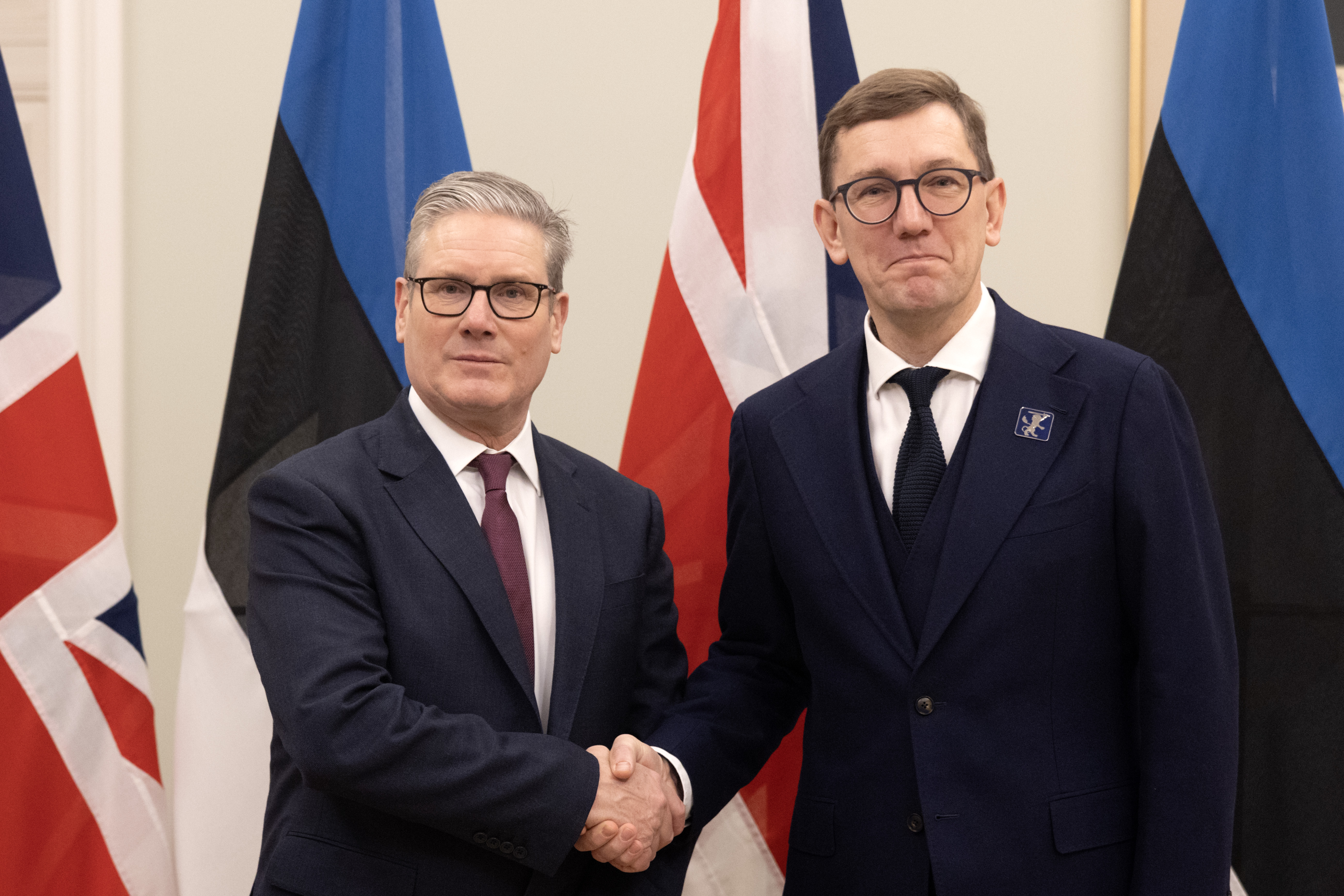
British Prime Minister Keir Starmer with Estonian Prime Minister Kristen Michal at a JEF summit in Tallinn, December 2024.

The relationship between the UK and Estonia has its beginning during the Estonian War of Independence, when the UK sent a Royal Navy detachment led by Admiral E.A. Sinclair to defend Estonia's shores. The British seamen who gave their lives defending Estonia's freedom during the conflict were laid to rest in the Tallinn Military Cemetery.

Before the Soviet occupation in 1940, relations between the UK and Estonia were close. The UK was a major market for Estonian produce: more than 30% of Estonia's exports went to the UK. The United Kingdom did not recognise Estonia's annexation. Estonia continued diplomatic relations with the UK in exile and later claimed state continuity. The Estonian legation in London was maintained and closed only in 1989, when financial pressure forced its sale.

The UK affirmed the restoration of the Estonian independence on 27 August 1991. Diplomatic relations between the two countries were re-established on 5 September 1991, and the British Embassy opened in Tallinn in the same year. Estonia's relations with the UK are close. Britain provided both political and practical support to Estonia's efforts to join the EU and NATO.

Both Estonia and the United Kingdom provided contributions to the NATO mission in Afghanistan.

In October 2016 it was announced that 800 British troops would be stationed at Tapa Army Base in Estonia.

== Cultural relations ==
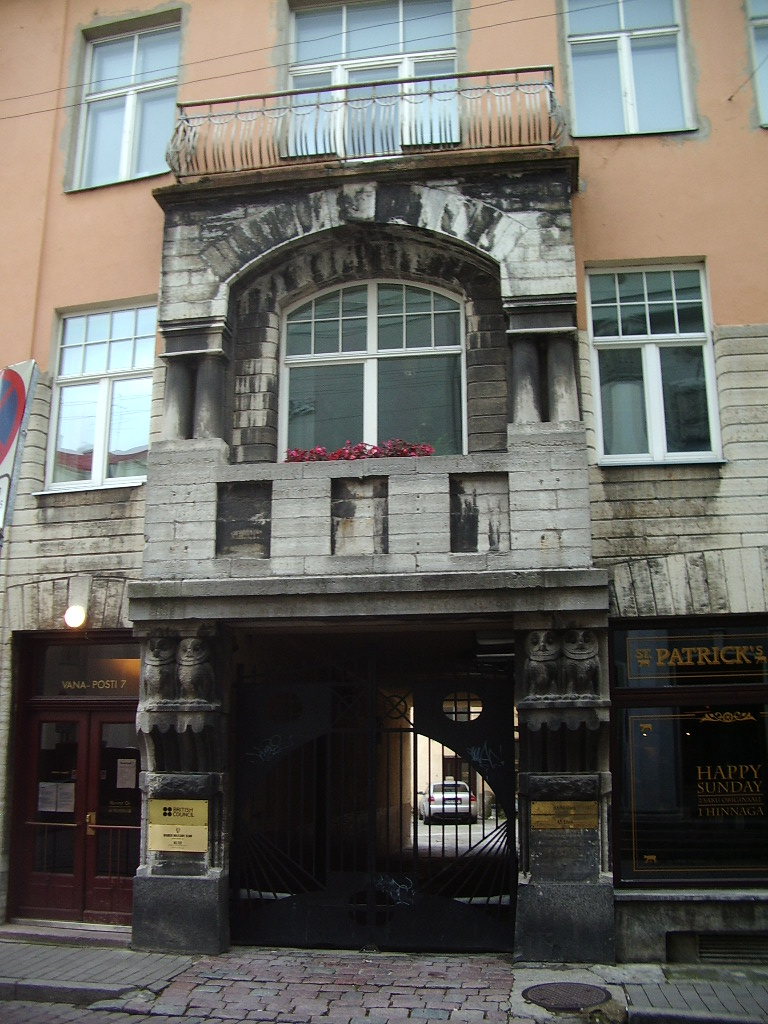
The British Council building in Tallinn

The British Council has a representation in Tallinn. There is an active programme of English language teaching support, cultural exchange and scholarships for Estonian students to study in the UK.

=== Migration ===
An estimated 10,000-15,000 Estonian citizens live in the UK, about 3,000-5,000 of them in London. The most active communities are in London, Bradford and Leicester. There is a total of 13 Estonian societies in the UK, the oldest being the London Estonian Society established in 1921.

=== Tourism ===
Tallinn and Estonia's reputation as a tourist destination has grown in Great Britain over the past few years. Estonia's accession to the EU in 2004 gave a significant boost to reciprocal travel – that year 30% and the following year (2005) 60% more (62.3 thousand) British tourists were accommodated in Estonia than in previous years. In 2012 nearly 55 thousand British tourists used Estonian accommodation establishments. Tallinn has also become one of the most popular destinations among Baltic cruise ports. In 2012 over 75 000 British cruise tourists visited Estonia.

Reports of British tourists excessively drinking in Tallinn have received media coverage in the UK.

== Economic relations ==
The UK is in 9th place among Estonia's trade partners, making up 3% of Estonia's total trade turnover. UK-Estonian trade was worth 790 million euros in 2012. As a foreign investor, the UK's interest in Estonia has been fairly great – it is the source of 2% of all foreign direct investments made in Estonia.

== Diplomacy ==
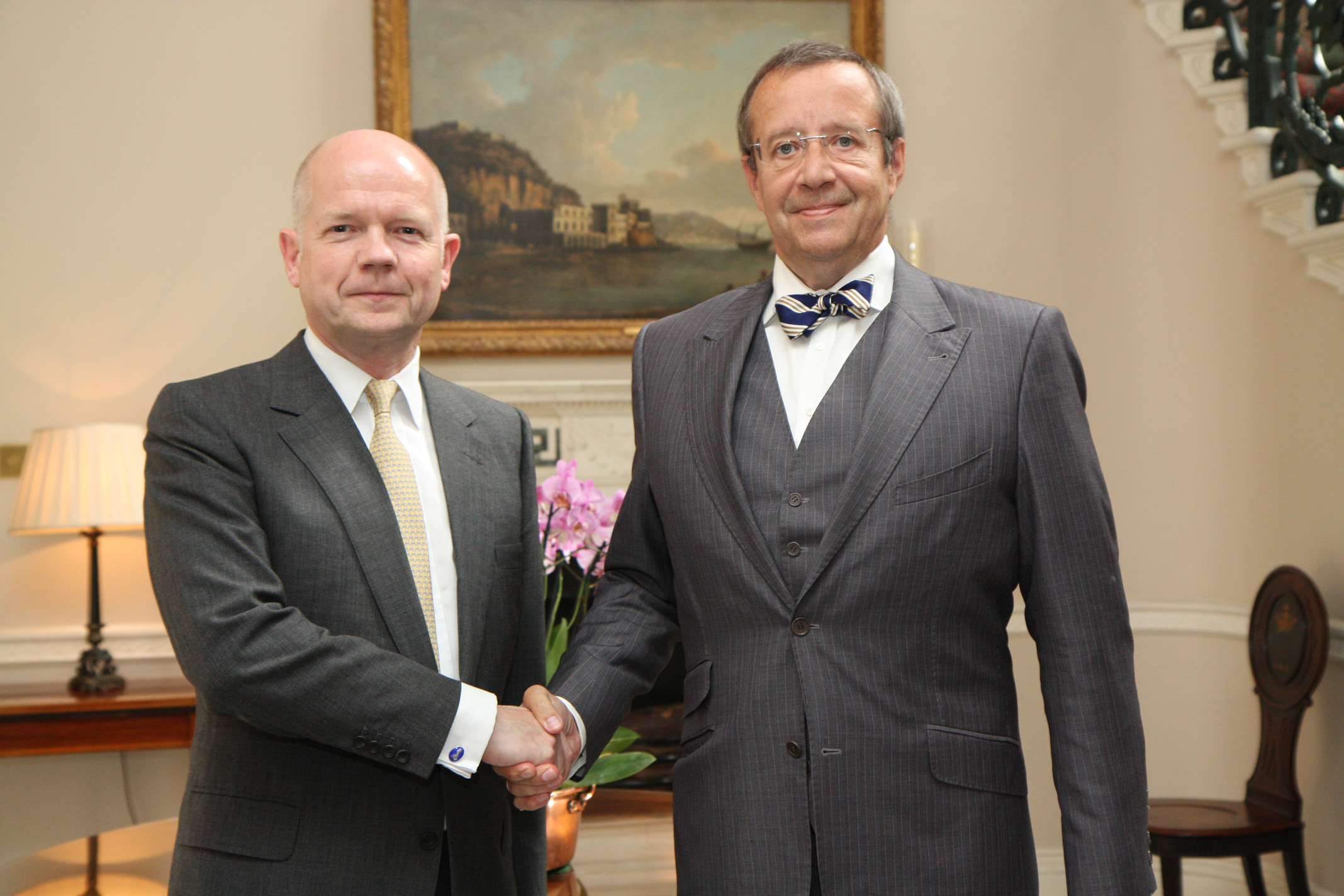
British Foreign Secretary William Hague meeting Estonian President Toomas Ilves in London, August 2012.

Lauri Bambus was appointed Estonian ambassador to the United Kingdom in August 2014. Christopher Holtby was appointed British ambassador to Estonia in January 2012.

Estonia has an embassy in London. The United Kingdom has an embassy in Tallinn.

Queen Elizabeth II of the United Kingdom paid a state visit to Estonia in October 2006. Prince Harry also made an official visit in May 2014 and paid tribute to Estonia's war dead.

Leaders regularly meet as part of the Northern Future Forum.

== Resident diplomatic missions ==
- Estonia has an embassy in London.
- The United Kingdom has an embassy in Tallinn.
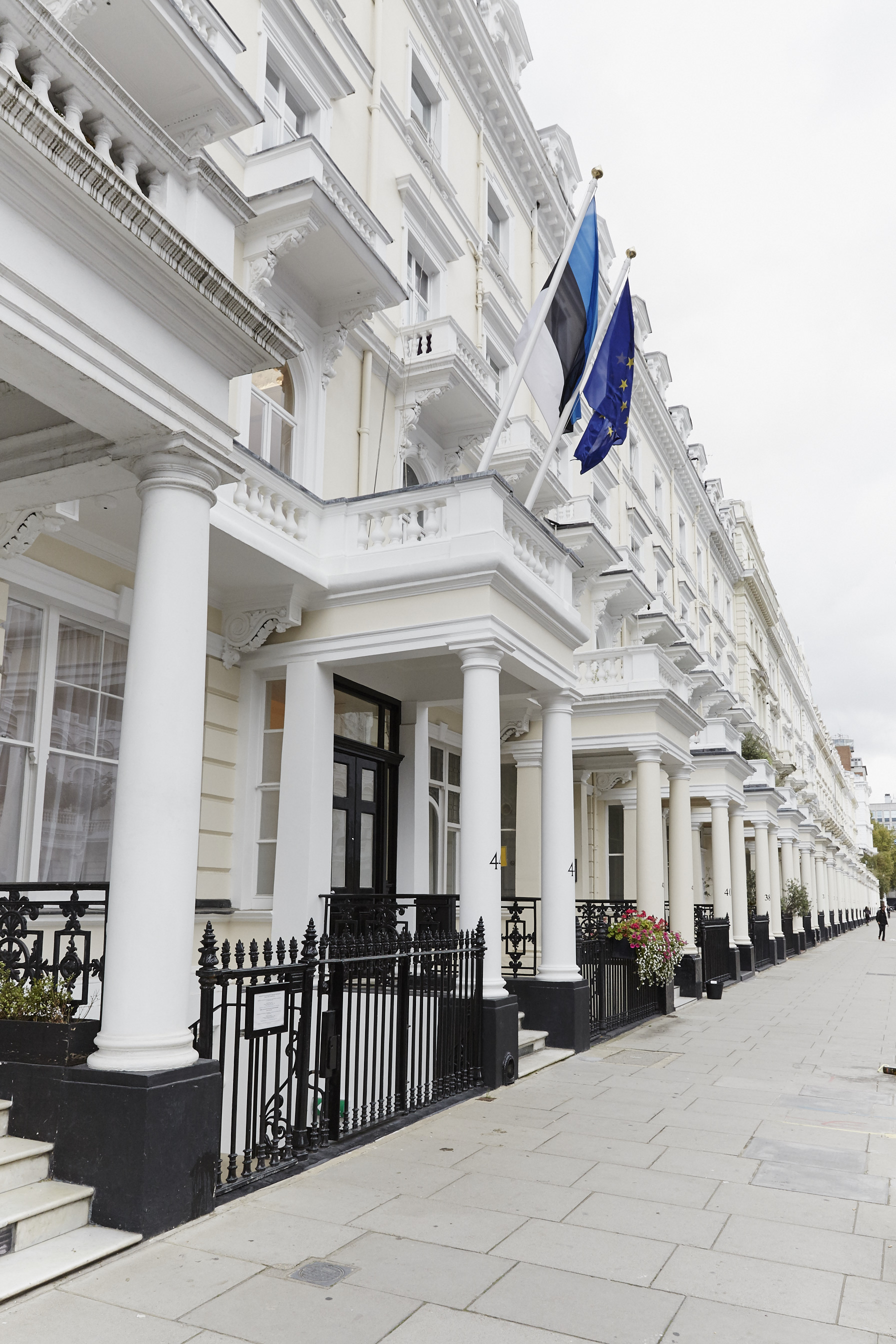
Embassy of Estonia in London

== See also ==
- Foreign relations of Estonia
- Foreign relations of the United Kingdom
- Embassy of Estonia, London
- List of Ambassadors of the United Kingdom to Estonia
- Estonians in the United Kingdom
