= Shropshire Miners' Association =

Former trade union in the United Kingdom

The Shropshire Miners', Enginemen's and Surfacemen's Federation, often known as the Shropshire Miners' Association, was a trade union representing coal miners in Shropshire, in England.

The union was founded in 1886, and before the end of the year, it became a founding affiliate of the Midland Counties Miners' Federation. In 1887, William Latham was elected as its general secretary. Always a small union, it had 830 members in 1896, in seven lodges, and 1,600 members in 1907.

In 1945, the National Union of Mineworkers was established, and the association became the Shropshire District of its Midland Area. A couple of years later, it merged into the South Staffordshire District.
