= George Henry Jones =

British trade unionist and politician

George Henry Jones (1884 – December 1958) was a British trade unionist and politician.

Born in Hednesford, Jones began working as a pit-boy at an early age. He became active in the Cannock Chase Miners' Association, and was elected as its president in 1912. In 1914, he became the full-time general secretary and agent for the North Warwickshire Miners' Association, and then in 1919 became general secretary and agent for the larger Warwickshire Miners' Association.

Jones was also active in the Labour Party, serving on Tamworth Town Council, and he stood in the 1922 Tamworth by-election, taking a distant second place, with 31.2% of the vote. Eventually, he served as Mayor of Tamworth. At the 1931 and 1935 United Kingdom general elections, he stood unsuccessfully in Lichfield.

In about 1930, Jones was elected as secretary of the Midland Miners' Federation, to which all his previous unions were affiliated; he remained leader of the Warwickshire Miners. He served on the executive of the Miners' Federation of Great Britain (MFGB). He remained in post as the MFGB became the National Union of Mineworkers, but left his trade union posts in 1947, to become Labour Director of the West Midlands Coal Board, then in 1950 became its vice-chair. He retired in 1952, although he continued to serve as a part-time member of the board until his death, four years later.

Trade union offices
Preceded by William Johnson, Jnr	General Secretary of the Warwickshire Miners' Association; 1919–1947	Succeeded by A. J. Pratt
Preceded by John Baker?	General Secretary of the Midland Miners' Federation c.1930–1947	Succeeded by J. H. Southall
