= George Henry Rowlinson =

George Henry Rowlinson (1852 – 23 May 1937) was a British trade unionist.

Born in James Bridge in Staffordshire, Rowlinson began working at a coal mine at the age of seven, and was illiterate until his twenties. He then learned to read and write, also becoming active in the Primitive Methodists as a lay preacher, and joining the West Bromwich Miners' Association. He served as the president of the West Bromwich Miners on two occasions before its strike of 1884.

After the 1884 strike, Rowlinson found himself blacklisted, and in order to find work, he relocated to the Forest of Dean. There, he helped reestablish the moribund union, the Forest of Dean Miners' Association, and became its secretary in 1886. Under his leadership, the union became part of the Midland Miners' Federation, and through it was a founder member of the Miners' Federation of Great Britain. He stood for the MFGB committee on several occasions, winning election only in 1891.

Rowlinson served on the United School Board until 1902, and then on its successor, the County Education Committee. He was also elected to the district council, and came to serve as its chair. He retired from his trade union post in 1918, and died in 1937.

Trade union offices
Preceded by Timothy Mountjoy	Secretary of the Forest of Dean Miners' Association; 1886–1918	Succeeded by Herbert Booth
