= Embassy of Estonia, London =

Diplomatic mission of Estonia to United Kingdom

Coordinates: 51.5007°N 0.1811°W

Embassy of Estonia in London
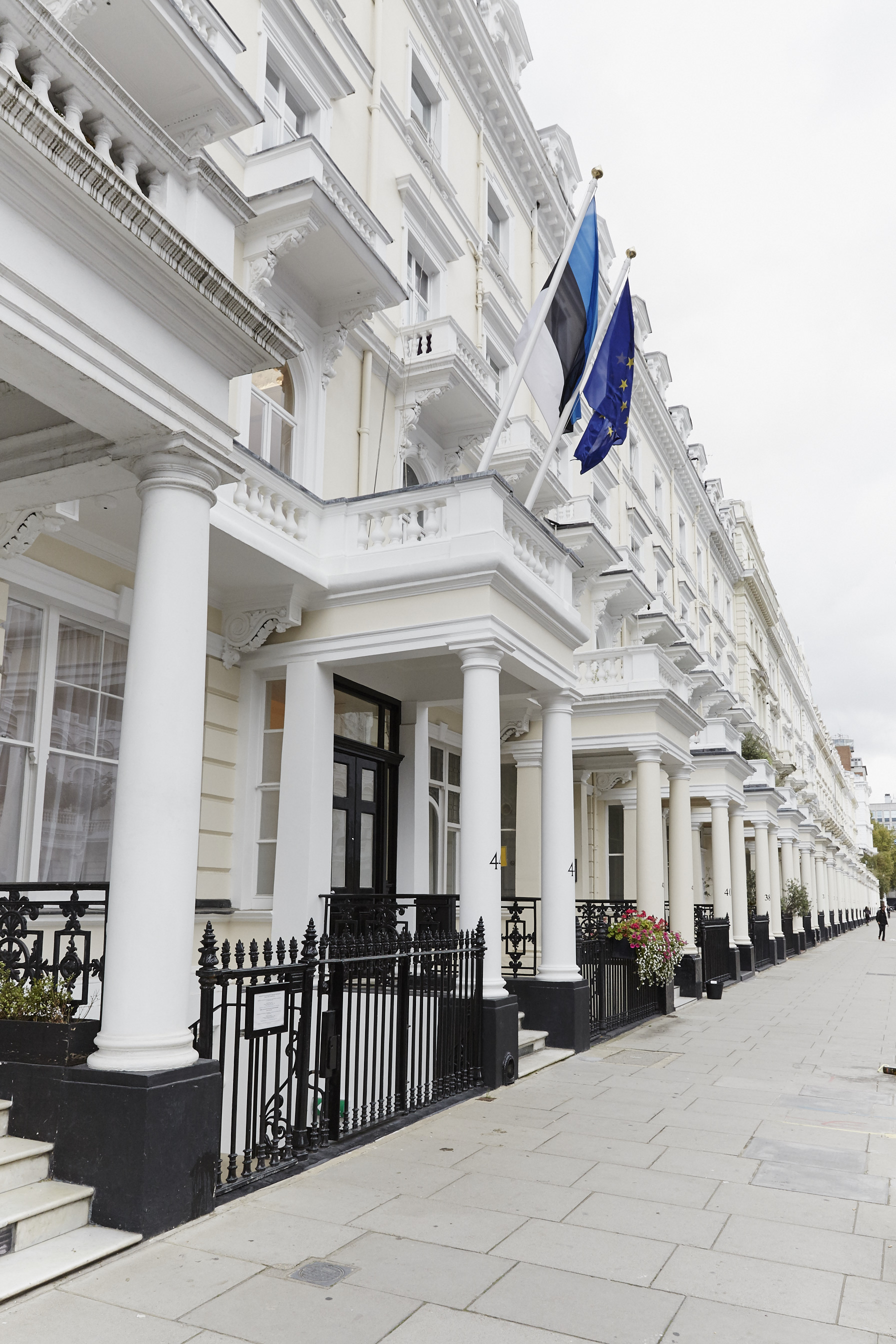
- Location: South Kensington, London
- Address: 44 Queen's Gate Terrace, London, SW7 5PJ
- Ambassador: Sven Sakkov

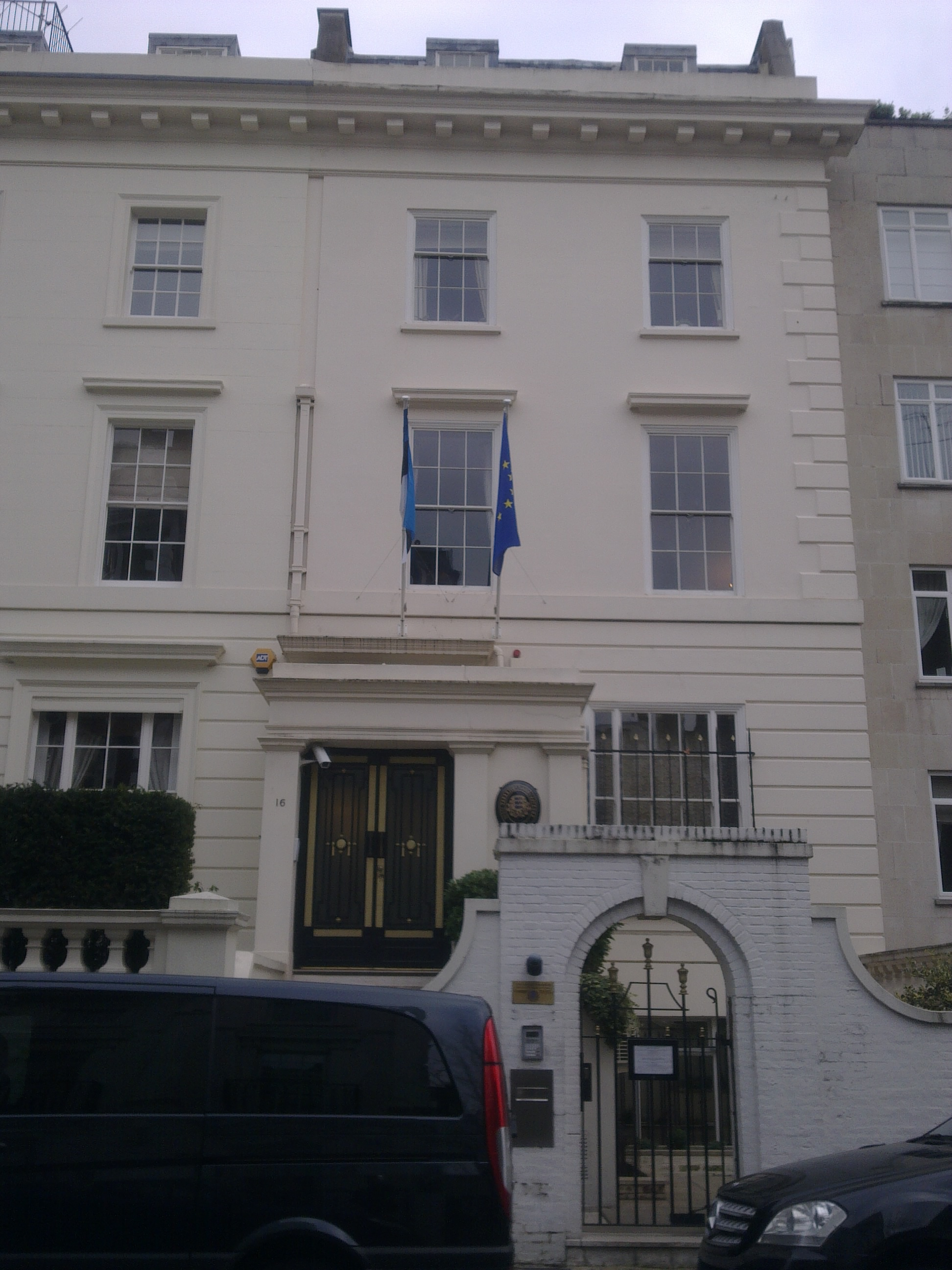
The former embassy at 16 Hyde Park Gate

The Embassy of Estonia in London is the diplomatic mission of Estonia in the United Kingdom. It is located at 44 Queen's Gate Terrace. The new building of the Estonian Embassy in London at Queen's Gate Terrace was opened on 14 October 2015 by Estonian Foreign Minister Marina Kaljurand. It is part of a Grade II listed terrace constructed in the mid-1800s. The former embassy building at 16 Hyde Park Gate is now the ambassador's residence.

== See also ==
- List of diplomatic missions in London
- Estonia–United Kingdom relations
