= Benjamin Dean (trade unionist) =

Benjamin Dean (3 July 1839 – 5 March 1910) was a British trade union leader.

Born in Rushall, then in Staffordshire, Dean began working at a lime pit at the age of ten. His father died two years later, he found work in Wednesbury to support the family. Around the age of eighteen, he joined the Primitive Methodists, and became interested in trade unionism, leading a branch at his local pit before, in 1887, becoming the first agent of the Pelsall District Miners' Association.

As the leading figure in the Pelsall Miners, Dean persuaded it to affiliate to the Midland Miners' Federation, and was rewarded with the post of treasurer of the federation. Through this role, he attended the first conference of the Miners' Federation of Great Britain (MFGB), and later served on the MFGB's executive committee on six occasions. He appears to have briefly served as secretary of the Midland Miners, but was consistently re-elected as secretary of the Pelsall Miners. However, from 1890, he no longer worked as a miner, instead running a tobacconist business in Walsall.

In 1890, Dean was also elected to Walsall Town Council, serving as a Liberal-Labour member. He became the town's first working class magistrate in 1893, and served as mayor of the town in 1906. In 1907, he played little role in the dispute over MFGB affiliation to the Labour Party, but personally remained committed to the Liberals until his death in 1910. He was succeeded as secretary of the Pelsall miners by one of his sons, Frederick James Dean.

Trade union offices
Preceded by New position	Secretary of the Pelsall District Miners' Association; 1887 – 1910	Succeeded by Frederick James Dean
Preceded by S. H. Whitehouse	General Secretary of the Midland Miners' Federation; 1888 – 1890	Succeeded by Albert Stanley
