= David Llewellyn (trade unionist) =

Welsh miner, trade unionist and political activist (1907–1981)

David Rolfe Llewellyn
- Born: June 8, 1907; Blaengarw, South Wales
- Died: 21 October 1981
- Occupations: Miner, trade unionist, political activist
- Known for: South Wales Miners' Federation; Spanish Civil War political commissar; Labour Party candidate
- Political party: Communist Party of Great Britain (until 1940); Labour Party (after 1945)
- Parent(s): Thomas Llewellyn and Mary Ann

David Rolfe Llewellyn (8 June 1907 – 21 October 1981) was a Welsh miner, trade unionist, and political activist, who also fought in the Spanish Civil War.

Llewellyn was born in Blaengarw, a remote mining village in South Wales, to Thomas Llewellyn, a coal miner, and his wife, Mary Ann. He began working at a local colliery when he was sixteen, and became active in the South Wales Miners' Federation (SWMF), and also in the Communist Party of Great Britain (CPGB).

In 1936, Llewellyn took part in a hunger march of Welsh miners to London, and was elected as one of the leaders of the marchers. He next volunteered to fight for the Republicans in the Spanish Civil War, and was elected as a political commissar.

Back in South Wales, Llewellyn returned to mining, and in 1940 he moved a CPGB resolution at the SWMF's annual conference, opposing British involvement in World War II. The motion was lost, and the CPGB soon switched to support the war, and opposing strike action. Llewellyn believed that the Bevin Boys, 18-year-olds conscripted to work in the mines without knowledge of mining, had a good case for industrial action, and argued that they should strike. This led to him leaving the CPGB.

During the later part of the war, Llewellyn moved to work in Somerset, and in 1945 he was unanimously elected as agent and secretary of the Somerset Area of the National Union of Mineworkers, also serving on the executive of the National Union of Mineworkers. He joined the Labour Party, winning election to Somerset County Council, and stood unsuccessfully for the party in Wells at the 1951 United Kingdom general election, and in North Somerset at the 1955 United Kingdom general election.

The Somerset Area was merged into the South Wales Area of the National Union of Mineworkers in 1956, and Llewellyn returned to South Wales, finding work with the National Coal Board as its director for industrial relations in the region.

He died in 1981.

Trade union offices
Preceded by Fred Swift	Secretary of the Somerset Area of the National Union of Mineworkers; 1945–1956	Succeeded by Position abolished
