= Somerset Miners' Association =

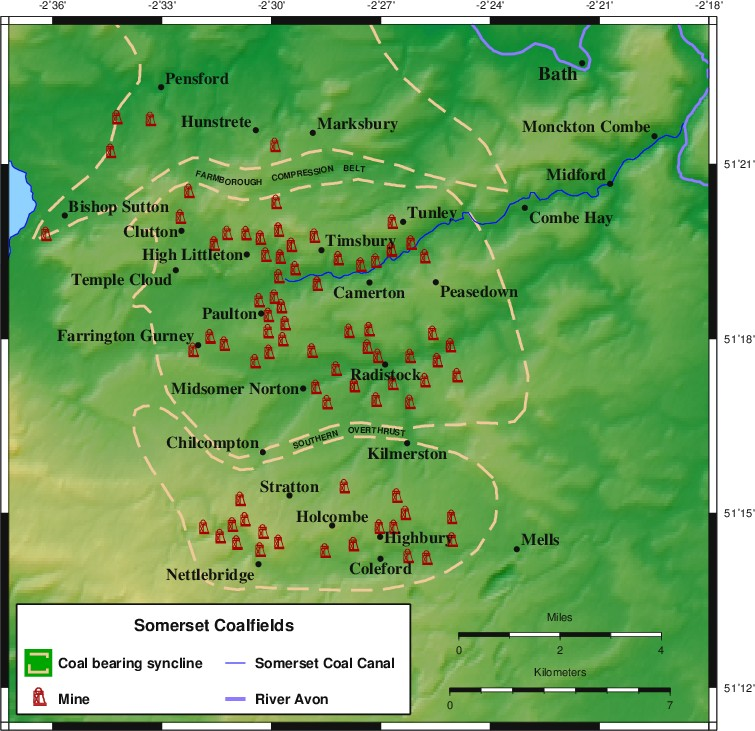
Somerset coalfield

The Somerset Miners' Association or Somersetshire Miners' Association was a coal mining trade union based in the Somerset coalfield, Somerset, England.

The union was founded in 1872 as a section of the Amalgamated Association of Miners. However, the AAM collapsed in 1875, and the union survived only on a much reduced basis, led by B. Fish and with a presence only in Radstock. In 1888, Samuel Henry Whitehouse, secretary of the Midland Miners' Federation, accepted an invitation to become the full-time secretary and agent for the union. A local coal mine owner almost immediately took Whitehouse to court for supporting a strike, nearly bankrupting him personally, but he remained in post until 1917, greatly expanding the reach and membership of the association.

Always one of the smaller coal mining unions in England, membership being around 2,000 in the 1890s, and reaching a peak membership of 4,310 around 1910.

The union was a founder of the Miners Federation of Great Britain in 1888, and from 1894 until 1904, it participated in the loose South Western Counties Miners’ Federation with the Bristol Miners' Association and the Forest of Dean Miners' Association. In 1937, the Bristol Miners' Association was merged into the Somerset Miners' Association, meaning that for the first time, one union covered all miners in Somerset. In 1945, the MFGB became the National Union of Mineworkers, and the Somerset Miners' Association became its West Country Area, with less autonomy than before. In 1956, due to a decline in mining in the county, the area was merged into the South Wales Area.

== Secretaries ==
1875: B. Fish
1888: S. H. Whitehouse
1917: Fred Swift
1945: David Llewellyn
