= 1916 North West Staffordshire by-election =

UK Parliamentary by-election

The 1916 North West Staffordshire by-election was held on 17 January 1916. The by-election was held due to the death of the incumbent Labour MP, Albert Stanley. It was won by the Labour candidate Samuel Finney who was unopposed due to a War-time electoral pact.
