= Pelsall District Miners' Association =

English coal miner trade union

- Founded: 1887
- Headquarters: Lloyds Chambers, Park Street, Walsall
- Location: England
- Members: 6,120 (1907)
- Parent organization: Midland Miners' Federation

The Pelsall District Miners' Association was a trade union representing coal miners in the Walsall area of England.

The union was founded in 1887. By the end of the year, it already had 2,181 members, and had appointed Benjamin Dean as its full-time agent and secretary. It also affiliated to the Midland Counties Miners' Federation.

Membership of the union was fairly constant for many years, but by 1907 had increased to 6,120. It fell to 3,713 in 1911, but was back over 5,000 by 1925.

In 1945, the union became the Pelsall District of the Midland Area of the National Union of Mineworkers, with far less autonomy than before. A couple of years later, it merged into the Cannock Chase District.

== General Secretaries ==
1887: Benjamin Dean
1910: Frederick James Dean
1923: John Blakemore
