= Cannock Chase Miners' Association =

English trade union representing coal miners

- Cannock Chase Miners', Enginemen's and Surfacemen's Association
- Founded: 1876
- Headquarters: Miners' Hall, West Hill, Hednesford
- Location: England
- Members: 7,500 (1907)
- Parent organization: Midland Miners' Federation

The Cannock Chase Miners', Enginemen's and Surfacemen's Association was a trade union representing coal miners working the Cannock Chase Coalfield in the Cannock Chase area of England.

The union was founded in 1876. Albert Stanley became the leader of the union in 1884, and he put it on a much sounder footing. In 1886, it became a founder constituent of the Midland Counties Miners' Federation, through which it subsequently became part of the Miners' Federation of Great Britain (MFGB). The association registered as a union with the Board of Trade in 1887, and at that point Stanley was officially appointed as general secretary. Membership of the union grew steadily, reaching 7,500 in 1907.

In 1945, the union became the Cannock Chase District of the Midland Area of the National Union of Mineworkers, with far less autonomy than before. A couple of years later, it absorbed the Pelsall District.

== General Secretaries ==
1884: Albert Stanley
1907: S. F. Dangerfield
c.1915: John Baker
