= Herbert Booth (trade unionist) =

British trade unionist

Herbert W. Booth (died 1977 or 1978) was a British trade unionist.

Booth worked as a coal miner in Nottinghamshire and became active in the Nottinghamshire Miners' Association (NMA). He won an NMA scholarship to attend the Central Labour College. There, he met A. J. Cook, who became a lifelong friend.

Booth returned to Nottinghamshire in 1914, where he joined the Independent Labour Party (ILP). He led a successful campaign against the NMA leadership's plans to leave the Miners' Federation of Great Britain's (MFGB) political fund, and also began teaching classes on politics and economics to other miners; attendees included Jack W. Smith.

Booth's left-wing group in the union proved popular and, in response, the NMA's president, George Spencer, began adopting more left-wing positions himself. However, in 1918, Booth took up a full-time post as agent and secretary of the Forest of Dean Miners' Association, and in his absence Spencer became the NMA's general secretary and returned to more right-wing views. Booth returned to Nottinghamshire in 1922, when he was elected checkweighman at Annesley Colliery; in his absence, he had lost some support, and Spencer felt able to lead a major split in the union after the UK general strike. Booth remained loyal to the NMA, and was rewarded by election as its vice-president. In 1932, changes in the union's leadership led to a series of elections; Booth stood unsuccessfully for the posts of general secretary and financial secretary, before winning one to become president.

As president, Booth focused on promoting reunification with the rival Nottinghamshire Miners' Industrial Union (NMIU). This was unpopular with some NMA activists, but was supported by Cook, who had become secretary of the MFGB. In 1937, Booth stood down as president to become a full-time agent for the union. Later that year, the NMA merged with the NMIU to form the Nottinghamshire Miners' Federated Union; the rationalisation of posts in the new union led to Booth losing both his work as an agent and his position on the executive committee.

Despite being temporarily sidelined, Booth remained a prominent figure among Nottinghamshire miners. In 1944, the NMFU became the Nottinghamshire Area of the National Union of Mineworkers. New rules on maximum ages of union officers forced general secretary Val Coleman to retire in 1945, and Booth won election as general secretary of the union. He retired a few years later.

Trade union offices
Preceded by George Henry Rowlinson	General Secretary of the Forest of Dean Miners' Association; 1918–1922	Succeeded by Jack Williams
Preceded by F. Rawson?	Vice President of the Nottinghamshire Miners' Association c.1926 – 1932	Succeeded by William Askew
Preceded by Val Coleman	President of the Nottinghamshire Miners' Association; 1932 – 1937	Succeeded by Bernard Taylor
Preceded by Val Coleman	General Secretary of the Nottinghamshire Area of the National Union of Mineworkers; 1945 – c.1950	Succeeded by Albert Martin
