= Walter John French =

British trade unionist and politician

Walter John French (1868 – 1937) was a British trade unionist and politician.

Born in Tamworth, Staffordshire, French did not receive a formal education. He became a coal miner, and joined the North Warwickshire Miners' Association. From 1916 to 1919, he was president of the North Warwickshire Miners. In 1921, the union merged into the Warwickshire Miners' Association, and French was elected to serve on its executive.

French was active in the Labour Party, serving on the Tamworth Board of Guardians, including a spell as vice-chairman in 1920. At the 1922 United Kingdom general election, he stood for the party in Lichfield, taking 46.8% of the vote and a close second place. He also served as president of the Tamworth Co-operative Society.

French was later elected to Tamworth Borough Council, subsequently becoming an alderman. He also served as a magistrate in the town.
