= Thomas Twyford =

English pottery manufacturer (1849–1921)

Thomas William Twyford (1849–1921) was an English pottery manufacturer. He invented the single piece, ceramic flush toilet. At the time of Twyford's death he was recognised as a leading pioneer in the application of principles of hygiene to sanitary appliances.

== Life ==
Thomas William Twyford was born the eldest son to Thomas Twford and Sarah Jones of Hanover Street, Hanley, Stoke-on-Trent, Staffordshire. Twyford's father established two different located earthenware factories: the Bath Street works in Hanley, and the Abbey works in Bucknall. He was able to build a substantial trade-base in both the mainland of Europe and the United States.

In September 1874, Twyford's father died, leaving him the family business. However, the company was under management and control by trustees for a short period before he was able to take over.

In March 1879, Twyford released his first sanitaryware catalogue. The 1870s proved to be a defining period for the sanitary industry and the water closet; the debate between the simple water closet trap basin made entirely of earthenware and the very elaborate, complicated and expensive mechanical water closet would fall under public scrutiny and expert opinion. In 1875, the "wash-out" trap water closet was first sold and was found as the public's preference for basin type water closets. By 1879, Twyford had devised his own type of the "wash out" trap water closet; he titled it the "National". The National met all of the requirements of the quintessential wash-out trap water closets, most defining, the shallow basin water reserve that would be forced through the water-sealed trap when flushed. The National came out as the market place's most popular wash-out water closet.

In 1881, Twyford's National had won an honorary award at sanitary exhibitions at Kensington and Brighton. In 1882, with the success granted by the National, Twyford released a second wash-out closet entitled "The Crown", and in 1883, he designed and released his third wash-out closet named "The Alliance". All three models were not free-standing and required the support of a wooden seat within a substratum wooden enclosure to hold the contraptions.

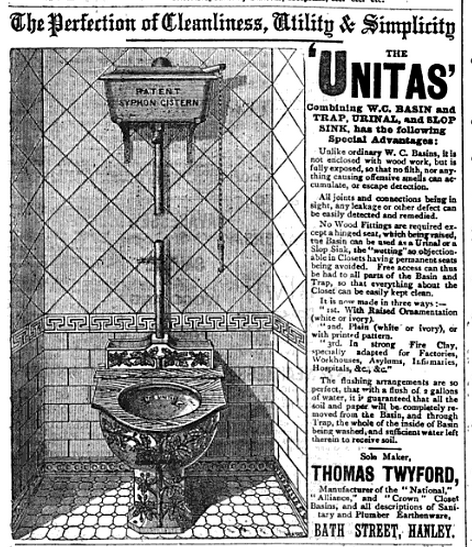
Ad for Unitas (1886)

By the 1880s, the free-standing water closet was first sold and quickly gained popularity because it was more easily cleaned and thus more hygienic. It was not long before Twyford adopted the new innovation. In 1884 he released his first free-standing water closet made with earthenware, named the "Unitas". The first Unitas possessed an open trap but Twyford was eager to remedy this. He commissioned his best potters to produce a free-standing water closet that had a lid to the trap and was made completely of earthenware. However, even though Twyford was quick to jump on the most innovative developments in the sanitary industry – and often can be credited with being the pioneer in some of these developments – he was in fact not the first person to release a one-piece pedestal water closet. It is most probable that a London firm with George Jennings is attributed for releasing the first successful one-piece pedestal water closet. However, Twyford's Unitas was greatly celebrated during the 1880s as one of the best one-piece pedestal water closets, especially because it was made of entirely one piece of earthenware and Twyford made certain that there were "pleasant to the eye" designs painted on the exterior and in the interior of the more expensive models.

In 1886, Twyford released a second stylist version of the Unitas called the "Florentine", which was put in the catalogue later that year. In 1884, Twyford applied for the first patent for a ceramic baffle or "fan" that would aid the process of distributing the water around the basin; it was placed near the flush inlet. In 1886 and 1887, Twyford submitted further patents for improvements to the flushing rim and the outlet. In 1888, he applied for a patent protection for his "after flush" chamber; the device allowed for the basin to be refilled by a lower quantity of clean water in reserve after the water closet was flushed.

In 1887, Twyford exhibited in a catalogue the after flushing reservoir chamber in a previous basin trap water closet. He included it in his 1879 catalogue, calling the device the "Lillyman"; however, regardless of its finer ingenuity compared to other products in the market, it did not match the success of its counterpart the National. It is possible that the Lillyman did not find success purely because of its poor placement in Twyford's catalogue, being in the back and sharing its page with the lower and cheaper models of trap water closets intended for the use of clients who were either poor or servants.

In the later 1880s, Twyford made further improvements to the sanitary industry and lengthened his reach beyond water closets. He produced and released a pedestal hand-basin made completely of earthenware that had "improved holes for the taps"; he eventually even attached overflow chambers and an outer-layer of material that was more pleasing to see to cover the iron brackets that supported the basin. Twyford even developed a bidet that was made completely of earthenware and had both a hot and cold tap.

In 1887, he built a new factory at Cliffe Vale in Stoke-on-Trent, near the Trent and Mersey Canal and the North Staffordshire Railway.

From the mid-1870s to the turn of the century, Twyford's sanitary products business increased five-fold. He established showrooms for water closets in Berlin, Germany; Sydney; and Cape Town, South Africa. He made certain that the reach of his trade expanded from Russia to South America. In 1903, to fend off the high demands of his German competitors, Twyford had established a new fireclay works in Ratingen, a town near Düsseldorf.

In 1911, Twyford continued to expand his fireclay works: the first fireclay works was erected opposite the Cliffe Vale works. In 1912, Twyford built another local fireclay works on Garner Street in Etruria. In 1896, Twyford's firm became a private limited company, with Twyford initially serving as its chairman.

From 1898, Twyford lived in Whitmore Hall in Newcastle-under-Lyme and increased his public prominence, serving as High Sheriff of Staffordshire for 1906–07. As a political activist, he supported the Liberal Unionists and later founded the Unionist paper the Staffordshire Post, which would later combine with The Staffordshire Sentinel. Twyford eventually became Chairman of the paper. In 1907, he contested and lost the North West Staffordshire by-election as the Conservative Party's candidate.

On 21 March 1921, Twyford died at the Chine Hotel in Boscombe in the suburb of Bournemouth and was buried in Whitmore churchyard. On 20 June 1872, he had married Susannah Whittingham, the daughter of Edward Whittingham, a local farmer. Twyford and Susannah had one son and one daughter.

== See also ==
- Flush toilet
- Twyford Bathrooms
