= Frederick James Dean =

Frederick James Dean (5 November 1868 – 24 April 1941) was a British trade union leader.

Born in Walsall, Dean's father was Benjamin Dean, a coal miner who later became leader of the Pelsall District Miners' Association. Frederick was educated at the Butts School before completing an apprenticeship making horse collars, then moved to Manchester to work.

In about 1900, Dean returned to Walsall to take over the tobacconist shop which his father had been running as a sideline. He also assisted his father in running the Pelsall Miners and, in 1910, when his father died, Frederick easily won a vote to succeed him. He led the union through two major industrial actions, in 1912 and 1921; its financially strong position enabling it to support its members.

Dean was long a Liberal-Labour supporter, serving on Rushall Parish Council and the Walsall Board of Guardians and standing for Walsall Town Council. However, in 1916 he belatedly followed the majority of coal miners in switching his allegiance to the Labour Party. In 1922, he was elected to the executive of the Miners' Federation of Great Britain, but he resigned all his trade union posts the following year, due to poor health. He stood down from the Board of Guardians in 1924, and suffered a series of strokes. Over the next few years, he ran a new tobacconist business and served as a magistrate but, by the mid-1930s, he was confined to bed, ultimately dying in 1941.

Trade union offices
Preceded by Benjamin Dean	Secretary of the Pelsall District Miners' Association; 1910 – 1923	Succeeded by John Blakemore
