= Bristol Miners' Association =

Historic regional trade union

The Bristol Miners' Association was a trade union representing coal miners in Bristol and Bedminster in England.

The union was founded in June 1889 with around 2,000 members. It recruited Northumberland miner William Whitefield as its first agent and secretary. He was immediately successful, winning a 10% pay increase for members, leading to membership rising to 3,035 in 1892. This proved to be the union's high point; the gradual closure of local mines reduced membership to 2,167 by 1910.

From its foundation, the union was a member of the Miners Federation of Great Britain, and from 1894 until 1904, it participated in the loose South Western Counties Miners’ Federation with the Somerset Miners' Association and the Forest of Dean Miners' Association.

Whitefield retired in 1921 and was succeeded by the union's treasurer, Charles Gill. However, membership continued to decline, to 1,635 in 1925, and by 1937 there was only one pit remaining in the district. Gill was forced to accept a pay cut, and the Bristol Miners' Association was merged into the Somerset Miners' Association, meaning that for the first time, one union covered all miners in Somerset. By 1945, when the Somerset Miners' Association became the West Country Area of the National Union of Mineworkers, there were fewer than 400 members in the Bristol district.

== Secretaries ==
1889: William Whitefield
1912: Charles Gill
