= Forest of Dean Miners' Association =

The Forest of Dean Miners' Association was a trade union for coal miners in the Forest of Dean area of England.

The union was founded in 1870, based in Cinderford in Gloucestershire. It initially prioritised calling for waste ground to be sold cheaply to miners so they could set up their own works, and for workers to be represented on the local Board of Guardians. A strike in 1871 at Parkend Colliery was successful in raising wages and led to the appointment of a checkweighman.

The association became part of the Amalgamated Association of Miners (AAM) in 1872, but the AAM refused strike pay to local miners during a long dispute from 1874 to 1875, and so the union left and again became independent. This dispute was less successful, with only a concession of wage being reduced by 5% instead of 10%.

From 1873 to 1877, the union published a weekly newspaper, the Forest of Dean Examiner. In 1877, the general secretary, Timothy Mountjoy, was discharged, and the union became moribund until 1882, when it was reconstituted.

The union later joined the Miners' Federation of Great Britain, and from 1894 until 1904, it participated in the loose South Western Counties Miners’ Federation with the Bristol Miners' Association and the Somerset Miners' Association. In 1940, faced with falling number of miners in the district, it merged into the South Wales Miners Federation.

Henry Rowlinson served as agent and secretary of the union from the 1880s until 1917, when his support for World War I became unpopular. He was replaced by Jack Williams, soon to become a sympathiser of the Communist Party of Great Britain and prominent figure in the National Minority Movement, and the union began working frequently with the South Wales Miners Federation in supporting left-wing motions.

== General Secretaries ==
1870: Timothy Mountjoy
1877: Post vacant
1886: George Henry Rowlinson
1918: Herbert Booth
1922: Jack Williams

== See also ==
- Forest of Dean Coalfield
