= Midland Counties Miners' Federation =

Trade union

- Founded: 1886
- Dissolved: 30 June 2011
- Headquarters: Hednesford, Staffordshire
- Location: United Kingdom
- Members: 35,600 (1907)
- Key people: Enoch Edwards (President); Albert Stanley (Secretary)
- Parent organization: Miners' Federation of Great Britain (1889–1944); National Union of Mineworkers (1944–2011)
- Affiliations: Miners' Federation of Great Britain

The Midland Counties Miners' Federation was a trade union, representing coal miners in the West Midlands region of England.

== History ==
The union was founded in 1886. It initially had seven affiliates, including the North Stafford Miners' Association, the Old Hill and Highley District Miners, Enginemen and Surfacemen's Association, the Pelsall District Miners, the Shropshire Miners' Association, and the West Bromwich District Miners. It affiliated to the Miners' Federation of Great Britain.

By 1893, the federation's affiliates also included the Bristol Miners' Association, Forest of Dean Miners' Association, Somerset Miners' Association, and Warwickshire Miners' Association. The first three of these accepted reductions in wages which went against federation policy, and therefore left in 1894, recombining as the South-Western Federation.

In 1945, the union became the Midland Area of the National Union of Mineworkers, with less autonomy than before. It dissolved in 2011.

== Affiliates ==
Name	Founded	Joined	Members (1907)
Cannock Chase Miners', Enginemen's and Surfacemen's Association	1876	1886	7,500
North Stafford Miners' Association	1869	1886	16,709
Old Hill and Highley District Miners', Enginemen's and Surfacemen's Association	1870	1886	1,116
Pelsall District Miners' Association	1887	1887	6,120
Shropshire Miners' Association	1886	1886	1,600
Warwickshire Miners' Association	1885	1890s	9,000
West Bromwich Miners' Association	1869	1886	2,300

== Leadership ==
=== Presidents ===
1886: Enoch Edwards
1912: Samuel Finney
1930s: F. J. Hancock
1941: John Blakemore?
1950s: Arthur Baddeley
1963: Jack Lally
1983: John Connon

=== Secretaries ===
1886: Samuel Henry Whitehouse
1888: Benjamin Dean
1890: Albert Stanley
1915: John Baker?
1930s: George Henry Jones
1948: J. H. Southall
1963: A. M. Jones
1983: Jim Colgan
1990s: Joe Wills
