= Leonard Shoobridge =

Leonard Knollys Haywood Shoobridge (20 October 1858 – 1 February 1935) was an English writer, archaeologist, poet and politician. He is best known as a contributor to The Book of Bodley Head Verse (edited by J. B. Priestley) and co-author with Professor Sir Charles Waldstein of Herculaneum, past, present & future.

== Biography ==
Shoobridge was born in Kensington, London to William S Shoobridge, a solicitor and his wife Elizabeth, née Wansley. At the age of 13 he was living with his parents at 40 Queen's Gate Terrace, Kensington. He studied at Eton College and Balliol College, Oxford where he took honours in classics, and was a student of Sir Arthur Blomfield, a noted English architect specialising in restoring old buildings and churches. He accompanied George Granville Leveson-Gower, his lifelong friend, on a trip to India and Ceylon between October 1886 and June 1887.

At the age of 33 Shoobridge remained unmarried, and lived on his own means with his widowed father at Albury Hall, Albury, Hertfordshire. In July 1892, he stood as Liberal candidate for the local seat of Staffordshire, North Western, a seat previously held by Leveson-Gower, but he came second to the Conservative candidate, James Heath (5638 votes, 5406 votes). He became the owner and local JP of The Lea, Tunstall near Eccleshall, Staffordshire. Following the death of his father in 1903, he designed and had constructed a very ornate grave for his parents in the churchyard of St Mary the Virgin, Albury. Little remains because the grave was severely vandalised in 2009.

In 1908, Shoobridge was co-author, with Professor Sir Charles Waldstein, of Herculaneum, past, present & future. The book details the excavation of Herculaneum – a town in Italy buried, along with Pompeii, by the eruption of Vesuvius in 79 AD. Shoobridge, according to Waldstein, had been urging him since 1903 to excavate Herculaneum. They worked together researching collections of artefacts in the museum at Naples and propounded an ambitious project to create an international body for the preservation and further exploration of the site of Herculaneum. This was blocked by the Italian parliament. Reviewing the book, The Times Literary Supplement suggested that Shoobridge was a moderating influence on Waldstein's extravagant ideas. The Classical Weekly observed, "The main part of the book, all that requires real research or approximation thereto, seems to be the work of Mr. Shoobridge."

Shoobridge was a man of many talents. In 1910, he published a book of his poetry: Poems by Leonard Shoobridge. The Times Literary Supplement, reviewing the book, wrote,

If Mr. Shoobridge has any poems of twenty lines in this book, they are very few. He prefers two short stanzas; and he aims deliberately and patently, not at statement but suggestion. In many of these poems, indeed, he seems to be attempting to say nothing at all, and to care only for affecting the reader as he himself might be affected by a snatch of music. Very faint, very remote, very scent-like are even the most vivid of them:

He called the breezes of the south
To play upon the clustering hair
To linger on the roseate mouth

Sweet sighs evoking there

Sighs in the soul, and fear and all
A host of fancy's shimmering lights
Gleams in the dusk, when love-notes call

Through perfumed sultry nights.

Shoobridge bought a house in France and painted there, and during World War I, directed Red Cross work in Italy, under Lord Monson. In 1926, he was a contributor to The Book of Bodley Head Verse, a collection of poems which was edited by the novelist and playwright J. B. Priestley.

Shoobridge died in 1935, at his house near Nice in the south of France at the age of 76.

== Bibliography ==
- Charles Waldstein, Leonard Knollys Haywood Shoobridge (1908). Herculaneum, past, present & future. London: Macmillan & Co. p. 324. ISBN 9780722229545. OCLC 216830100.
