= Albert Stanley (Liberal politician) =

English politician

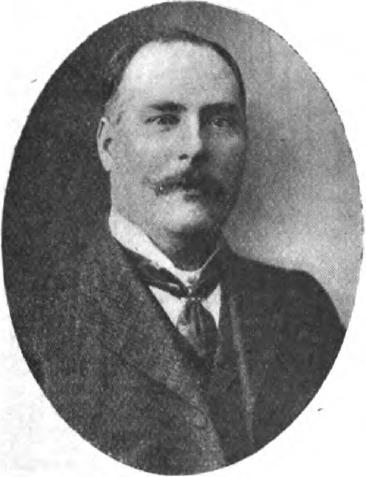
- Albert Stanley

Member of Parliament for North West Staffordshire
- In office 1907-December 1915

Personal details
- Born: 1863 Dawley, Shropshire, England
- Died: 17 December 1915 (aged 52)
- Party: Labour (after 1909); Liberal (before 1909)

Albert Stanley (1863 – 17 December 1915) was an English Liberal Party then Labour Party politician and secretary of the Midland Counties Miners' Federation.

== Early life ==
Stanley was born at Dark Lane, Dawley, Shropshire, one of ten children in a coal-mining family who were religiously Primitive Methodists. He himself began work as a miner aged eleven at Stirchley before moving to another pit at Hednesford, Staffordshire where he worked underground until a serious injury in an pit accident in 1884.

== Political career ==
In 1877 at the age of 15 he became secretary of his local Young Liberal Association. He supported Home Rule for Ireland and was an ardent follower of William Gladstone. From 1884 to his election to parliament he was Secretary of the Midland Counties Miners' Federation. He was elected to Staffordshire County Council at its inception in 1889 and sat until his death. In 1894 he was a founding member of the Midlands Liberal Federation. He was twice approached by the Liberal Party to stand for parliament but declined. However, on a third occasion in 1907 he accepted and was elected at the 1907 North West Staffordshire by-election. He sat as member of parliament (MP) for North West Staffordshire and was often described as a Liberal–Labour ('Lib-Lab') politician. He was opposed to the miners affiliating to the Labour Party but when in 1909 the Miners Federation of Great Britain voted to affiliate, although a lifelong Liberal, he agreed to seek re-election as a Labour Party candidate. He was returned to the House of Commons again at the December 1910 general election, and died in office in 1915, aged 52.

Parliament of the United Kingdom
Preceded by Alfred Billson	Member of Parliament for North West Staffordshire; 1907–1915	Succeeded by Samuel Finney
Trade union offices
Preceded by ?	General Secretary of the Cannock Chase Miners' Association; 1884–1907	Succeeded by S. F. Dangerfield
Preceded by Benjamin Dean	Secretary of the Midland Counties Miners' Federation; 1890–1915	Succeeded by John Baker?
