= Sir James Heath, 1st Baronet =

British politician

Heath in 1895.

Sir James Heath, 1st Baronet (26 January 1852 – 24 December 1942) was a businessman and Conservative Party politician in the United Kingdom.

== Early life ==
James Heath was second son of Robert Heath (died 1893), a colliery and ironworks owner, of Biddulph Grange, Staffordshire. He was educated at Clifton College.

== Business career ==
Heath was an ironmaster and colliery proprietor, who began as a partner in his father's company in 1873, for whom he travelled round the world twice on business.

Following his father's death in 1893, he and his brother Arthur founded a limited company named Robert Heath & Sons to run the concerns, which they sold to the Low Moor Iron Company in 1910. The brothers also founded the Birchenwood Colliery Company at Newchapel near Kidsgrove in 1893, and developed an associated coking and coal by-products business.

== Political career ==
He was Member of Parliament for North West Staffordshire from 1892 to the 1906 General Election when he lost in the Liberal landslide to Sir Alfred Billson. Billson died suddenly in July 1907, but Heath declined to contest the seat.

His father Robert Heath and brother Arthur Heath were also Members of Parliament.

He was also a J.P. for Staffordshire.

== Cricket ==
Heath played a single first-class cricket match for the Marylebone Cricket Club in 1882.

== Military service ==
He served in the Staffordshire Yeomanry, being promoted Captain in 1876, and honorary Major in 1890. He was Lieutenant-Colonel commanding from 1898 to 1902.

== Personal life ==
Heath was married four times. He married firstly, on 12 July 1881, Euphemia Celina, second daughter of Pieter Van-der-Byl, of Cape Town, South Africa, and of Elsenwood, Surrey, England. They had one daughter who survived her parents and one son, Percy Voltelin Heath, who died unmarried from wounds received in the First World War in France in September 1914. Lady Heath (as she became known following the creation of her husband's baronetcy) died on 21 August 1921.

He married secondly, on 6 February 1924, Mrs Joy Nitch Smith, eldest daughter of John Hounsell, of Stillman Valley, Ogle County, Illinois, U.S.A. There were no children of this marriage, which was annulled at his petition in 1927.

His third wife was Sophie Catherine Theresa Mary, previously Mrs Elliott Lynn, daughter of James Peirce-Evans, and better known during their marriage as Mary, Lady Heath (1896–1939), the Irish aviator. They married on 11 October 1927, he aged 75 and she 30 years old, but this marriage produced no children and he divorced her in 1932, although she had obtained a divorce decree nisi at Reno, Nevada, U.S.A. in 1930, citing his cruelty to her.

He married fourthly, on 6 February 1935, Dorothy Mary (born 1899), elder daughter of Christopher Mortimer Hodgson, of Beech, near Alton, Hampshire, England. She was 47 years his junior, but there were no children of this marriage. She survived him.

== Baronetcy and death ==
On 15 December 1904 Heath was made a baronet, of Ashorne Hill in the county of Warwickshire. Because his only son had died unmarried in World War I in 1914, the title became extinct on his death, aged 90, on 24 December (Christmas Eve), 1942.

Parliament of the United Kingdom
Preceded by Justinian Edwards-Heathcote	Member of Parliament for North West Staffordshire; 1892–1906	Succeeded by Alfred Billson
Baronetage of the United Kingdom
New creation	Baronet (of Ashorne Hill); 1904–1942	Extinct
Preceded by Boyle baronets	Heath baronets of Ashorne Hill; 15 December 1904	Succeeded by Nairn baronets
